= List of Bilderberg participants =

The following is a list of persons who are known to have attended one or more conferences organized by the Bilderberg Meeting. The list includes attendees by annual conference as well as by country.

== Attendees by annual conference ==
=== 1954 Conference ===
| Participants | Nationality | Title |
|---|---|---|
| Robert Andre | France | President of the Syndicat de Petrole |
| Ralph Assheton | United Kingdom | Member of Parliament; Former Parliamentary Secretary to Ministry of Supply; Former Financial Secretary to the Treasury |
| G. De Beaumont | France | Member of Parliament |
| Pierre Bonvoisin | Belgium | Banker; President of the Banque de la Societe Generale de Belgique (SGB) |
| Robert Boothy | United Kingdom | Member of Parliament |
| Max Brauer | West Germany | Former Mayor and President of the Land of Hamburg |
| Raffaele Cafiero | Italy | Senator |
| Walker L. Cisler | United States | Public Utility Executive; President, Detroit Edison Co; Consultant to Atomic Energy Commission and Mutual Security Agency |
| Gardner Cowles | United States | Publisher |
| Clement Davies | United Kingdom | Member of Parliament; Former Minister Chairman of Parliamentary Liberal Party |
| Jean Drapier | Belgium | Lawyer |
| Roger Duchet | France | Member of Parliament; Former Minister; Secretary General, Independents and Peasants Party |
| Maurice Faure | France | Member of Parliament |
| John H. Ferguson | United States | Lawyer; Vice-president and Executive Director, Committee for a National Trade Policy; Deputy Director, Policy Planning Staff, Department of State, 1951–1953 |
| John Foster | United Kingdom | Member of Parliament; Parliamentary Undersecretary of State for Commonwealth Relations |
| Oliver Franks | United Kingdom | Former Ambassador in Washington; Chairman of Lloyd's Bank |
| Gerhard P. Th. Geyer | West Germany | Industrialist; Director General of Esso |
| Colin Gubbins | United Kingdom | Major General; Formerly in Charge of Special Operations Executive (SOE) |
| Denis Healey | United Kingdom | Member of Parliament; Former Secretary of the International Committee of the Labour Party |
| Henry John Heinz II | United States | President, H.J. Heinz Co |
| Leif Hoegh | Norway | Shipowner; Founder of Leif Höegh & Co |
| C. D. Jackson | United States | Publisher; Formerly Special Assistant to President Eisenhower (1953–1954) |
| Nelson Dean Jay | United States | Banker; Director, J. P. Morgan & Co Inc. New York |
| Panagiotis Kanellopoulos | Greece | Member of Parliament; Minister of National Defense |
| V. J. Koningsberger | Netherlands | Professor, State University Utrecht |
| Ole Bjorn Kraft | Denmark | Member of Parliament; Former Minister of Foreign Affairs |
| Paul Leverkuehn | West Germany | Member of Parliament; Lawyer |
| Giovanni Malagodi | Italy | Member of Parliament |
| Finn Moe | Norway | Member of Parliament; Chairman, Parliamentary Foreign Affairs Committee; Vice-President, Council of Europe |
| H. Montgomery Hyde | United Kingdom | Member of Parliament |
| Roger Motz | Belgium | Senator; Chairman of the Liberal International; Former Chairman of the Liberal Party |
| Rudolf Mueller | West Germany | Lawyer |
| George C. McGhee | United States | Industrialist Assistant Secretary of State for Near Eastern & South African Affairs (1949–1952); U.S. Ambassador and Chief, American Mission for Aid to Turkey (1951–1953) |
| George Nebolsine | United States | Lawyer; Consultant to Department of State and Economic Cooperation Administration (1948); Trustee, U.S. Council of International Chamber of Commerce |
| H. Oosterhuis | Netherlands | Member of Parliament; President of the Netherlands Federation of Trade Unions |
| Cola G. Parker | United States | Industrialist; Member of Commission on Foreign Economic Policy (Randall Commission) |
| George W. Perkins | United States | Industrialist; Assistant Secretary of State for European Affairs (1949–1953) |
| Harry Pilkington | United Kingdom | President, Federation of British Industries |
| Antoine Pinay | France | Member of Parliament; Former Prime Minister |
| Panagiotis Pipinelis | Greece | Former Foreign Minister; Former Ambassador to Soviet Union |
| Alberto Pirelli | Italy | Industrialist; Minister of State |
| Pietro Quaroni | Italy | Ambassador to France; Former Ambassador to the Soviet Union |
| Ludwig Rosenberg | West Germany | Chief of Department of Foreign Affairs of the Trade Unions |
| Paolo Rossi | Italy | Member of Parliament |
| Denis de Rougemont | Switzerland | Author; Director, European Cultural Center |
| Paul Rijkens | United States | Industrialist; Chairman of Unilever N.V. |
| Ernst Georg Schneider | United States | Industrialist; President, Chamber of Commerce of Düsseldorf |
| Joseph P. Spang, Jr. | United States | Industrialist; President, The Gillette Co. |
| Max Steenberghe | Netherlands | Former Minister of Economic Affairs of the Netherlands |
| Pierre-Henri Teitgen | France | Vice-president of the Council of Ministers |
| Terkel M. Terkelsen | Denmark | Chief editor, Berlingske Tidende |
| Herbert Tingsten | Sweden | Chief editor, Dagens Nyheter |
| H. Troeger | West Germany | Minister of Finance of Hesse |
| Vittorio Valletta | Italy | Industrialist; President of FIAT |
| Andre Voisin | France | President, La Federation |
| H. F. van Walsem | Netherlands | Industrialist; Member of the Board of Philips Industries Eindhoven |
| Jean Willems | Belgium | Fondation Universitaire |
| Thomas Williamson | United Kingdom | General Secretary, National Union of General and Municipal Workers |
| B. H. M. Vlekke | Netherlands | Secretary General of the Netherlands' Society of International Affairs |

=== 1957 Conference ===
| Participants | Nationality |
|---|---|
| Raymond Aron | France |
| David Astor | United Kingdom |
| George Ball | United States |
| Fritz Berg | West Germany |
| Muharrem Nuri Birgi | Turkey |
| Eugene R. Black Sr. | United States |
| Robert R. Bowie | United States |
| McGeorge Bundy | United States |
| Hakon Christiansen | Denmark |
| Walker Lee Cisler | United States |
| Pierre Commin | France |
| B. D. Cooke | United Kingdom |
| Arthur Dean | United States |
| Thomas E. Dewey | United States |
| William Elliot | United Kingdom |
| Fritz Erler | West Germany |
| Amintore Fanfani | Italy |
| John Ferguson | United States |
| J. William Fulbright | United States |
| Jean de la Garde | France |
| Lincoln Gordon | United States |
| F. A. de Graaff | Netherlands |
| Colin Gubbins | United Kingdom |
| Lawrence Hafstad | United States |
| Jens Christian Hauge | Norway |
| Brooks Hays | United States |
| Denis Healey | United Kingdom |
| Arnold Heeney | Canada |
| Michael A. Heilprin | United States |
| Henry John Heinz II | United States |
| Leif Høegh | Norway |
| Paul G. Hoffman | United States |
| Charles Douglas Jackson | United States |
| William H. Jackson | United States |
| Per Jacobsson | Sweden |
| George F. Kennan | United States |
| Kurt Georg Kiesinger | West Germany |
| Henry Kissinger | United States |
| Piet Lieftinck | Netherlands |
| Imbriani Longo | Italy |
| Giovanni Malagodi | Italy |
| Paul Martin | Canada |
| David Maxwell | United Kingdom |
| John J. McCloy | United States |
| David J. McDonald | United States |
| George C. McGhee | United States |
| Ralph McGill | United States |
| Adnan Menderes | Turkey |
| Alexander Menne | West Germany |
| Rudolf Mueller | West Germany |
| Robert Daniel Murphy | United States |
| Frank C. Nash | United States |
| George Nebolsine | United States |
| Paul Nitze | United States |
| Allan Noble | United Kingdom |
| Morehead Patterson | United States |
| Antoine Pinay | France |
| John Pomian | United Kingdom |
| Don K. Price | United States |
| Henry Lithgow Roberts | United States |
| David Rockefeller | United States |
| Herman van Roijen | Netherlands |
| Dean Rusk | United States |
| Paul Rykens | Netherlands |
| J. L. S. Steel | United Kingdom |
| Arthur Hays Sulzberger | United States |
| Terkel Terkelsen | Denmark |
| John M. Vorys | United States |
| Marcus Wallenberg Jr. | Sweden |
| Frazar Wilde | United States |
| Alexander Wiley | United States |
| Otto Wolff von Amerongen | West Germany |
| W. T. Wren | United Kingdom |
| Paul van Zeeland | Belgium |

=== 1958 Conference ===
| Participants | Nationality |
|---|---|
| Hermann Josef Abs | West Germany |
| Dean Acheson | United States |
| Gianni Agnelli | Italy |
| George Ball | United States |
| Walworth Barbour | United States |
| Wilfrid Baumgartner | France |
| Edward Beddington-Behrens | United Kingdom |
| Berthold Beitz | West Germany |
| Fritz Berg | West Germany |
| Muharrem Nuri Birgi | Turkey |
| Pieter Blaisse | Netherlands |
| James Boden | West Germany |
| Erik Boheman | Sweden |
| Max Brauer | West Germany |
| Warren Randolph Burgess | United States |
| Louis Camu | Belgium |
| Guido Carli | Italy |
| Clifford P. Case | United States |
| Victor Cavendish-Bentick | United Kingdom |
| Ralph Cochrane | United Kingdom |
| Erich Dethleffsen | West Germany |
| Fritz Erler | West Germany |
| John Ferguson | United States |
| Hugh Gaitskell | United Kingdom |
| Walter L. Gordon | Canada |
| Jo Grimmond | United Kingdom |
| Colin Gubbins | United Kingdom |
| Walter Hallstein | West Germany |
| Joseph C. Harsch | United States |
| Gabriel Hauge | United States |
| Denis Healey | United Kingdom |
| Michael Heilprin | United States |
| Henry John Heinz II | United States |
| Leif Høegh | Norway |
| Charles Douglas Jackson | United States |
| David Maxwell | United Kingdom |
| Eelco van Kleffens | Netherlands |
| Edward Knollys | United Kingdom |
| Ole Kraft | Denmark |
| Thorkil Kristensen | Denmark |
| Giovanni Malagodi | Italy |
| John J. McCloy | United States |
| George C. McGhee | United States |
| Philip Mosely | United States |
| Roger Motz | Belgium |
| Rudolf Mueller | West Germany |
| Alfred C. Neal | United States |
| George Nebolsine | United States |
| Paul Nitze | United States |
| David Ormsby-Gorex | United Kingdom |
| Frans Otten | Netherlands |
| Panagiotis Pipinelis | Greece |
| Alberto Pirelli | Italy |
| Pietro Quaroni | Italy |
| Alfred Roberts | United Kingdom |
| David Rockefeller | United States |
| Michael Ross | United States |
| Jacques Rueff | France |
| Paul Rykens | Netherlands |
| Carlo Schmid | West Germany |
| Cortlandt V. R. Schuyler | United States |
| J. L. S. Steele | United Kingdom |
| Terkel M. Terkelsen | Denmark |
| Henry Tiarks | United Kingdom |
| Every Vermeer | Netherlands |
| Marcus Wallenberg | Sweden |
| Otto Wolff von Amerongen | West Germany |
| Paul van Zeeland | Belgium |
| James David Zellerbach | United States |

=== 1963 Conference ===
| Participants | Title | Nationality |
|---|---|---|
| Gianni Agnelli | Vice-president, FIAT | Italy |
| Robert Orville Anderson | President, Aspen Institute for Humanistic Studies | United States |
| Raymond Aron | Journalist and University Professor | France |
| George Ball | Under Secretary of State | United States |
| John W. H. Bassett | Chairman and publisher, The Telegramme | Canada |
| Jacques Baumel | Senator; Secretary General, Union pour la Nouvelle Republique | France |
| Wilfrid Baumgartner | Former Minister of Finance | France |
| Henrik Beer | Secretary General, League of Red Cross Societies | Sweden |
| Frederic Bennett | Member of Parliament | United Kingdom |
| Fritz Berg | President, Federation of German Industries | West Germany |
| Muharrem Nuri Birgi | Ambassador to NATO | Turkey |
| Kurt Birrenbach | Member of Parliament | West Germany |
| Pieter Blaisse | Member of Parliament; Member of European Parliament | Netherlands |
| Max Brauer | Former Burgomaster of Hamburg; Member of Parliament | West Germany |
| James Callaghan | Member of Parliament | United Kingdom |
| Victor Cavendish-Bentinck | Adviser on Foreign Affairs to Unilever | West Germany |
| Albin Chalandon | Director, Banque Commerciale de Paris | France |
| Paul Chambers | Chairman, Imperial Chemical Industries Limited | United Kingdom |
| Walker Lee Cisler | Industrialist | United States |
| Harold van B. Cleveland | Director, Atlantic Policy Studies | United States |
| Emilio Collado | Vice President, Standard Oil New Jersey | United States |
| Lammot du Pont Copeland | President of E.I. du Pont de Nemours Inc. | United States |
| Karl Czernetz | MP; Chairman Foreign Affairs Committee of the Austrian Parliament | Austria |
| Sven Dahlman | Former Ambassador | Sweden |
| Arthur Dean | International Lawyer and Diplomat | United States |
| Alighiero de Micheli | Industrialist; Former Chairman, Federation of Italian Industries | Italy |
| James Duncan | Company Director | Canada |
| Nejat Eczacıbaşı | President of Eczacıbaşı İlaçları Limited Şirketi | Turkey |
| Hans Engen | Under Secretary of State; Ministry of Foreign Affairs | Norway |
| Fritz Erler | Member of Parliament | West Germany |
| Maurice Faure | Member of Parliament | France |
| André Fontaine | Chief Foreign Service Le Monde | France |
| Cornelius Gallagher | Congressman | United States |
| Pierre Gallois | General | France |
| William Gossett | Deputy Special Representative for Trade Negotiations | United States |
| A. G. S. Griffin | Banker | Canada |
| Colin Gubbins | Industrialist | United Kingdom |
| Guillaume Guindey | General manager, Bank for International Settlements | France |
| Gabriel Hauge | Vice-chairman, Manufacturers Hanover Trust Company | United States |
| Denis Healey | Member of Parliament; Labour Party Spokesman on Defense | United Kingdom |
| Edward Heath | Lord Privy Seal | United Kingdom |
| Henry J. Heinz II | Chairman of the Board, Heinz | United States |
| Hans von Herwarth | Secretary of State to Federal President | West Germany |
| William Alexander Hewitt | President, Deere & Company | United States |
| Bourke B. Hickenlooper | Senator | United States |
| Leif Høegh | Shipowner | Norway |
| Charles D. Jackson | Publisher, Life Magazine | United States |
| Paul Jolles | Delegate of the Federal Council for Trade Agreements | Switzerland |
| Herman Kling | Minister of Justice | Sweden |
| Max Kohnstamm | Vice-president, Action Committee for a United States of Europe | Netherlands |
| Ole Bjørn Kraft | Former Minister of Foreign Affairs; Member of Parliament | Denmark |
| Lyman L. Lemnitzer | Supreme Commander Allied Forces in Europe | United States |
| Emiel van Lennep | Chairman, Monetary Committee EEC | Netherlands |
| Sicco Mansholt | Vice-president, EEC | Netherlands |
| Edward Mason | Professor | United States |
| René Massigli | Ambassador | France |
| Marcelo Duarte Matias | Ambassador to France; Former Minister of Foreign Affairs | Portugal |
| George McGhee | Government Official | United States |
| Johannes Meynen | President, AKU | Netherlands |
| Roland Michener | Barrister and Business Executive | Canada |
| Guy Mollet | Former Prime Minister | France |
| Robert Murphy | President, Corning Glass International | United States |
| George Nebolsine | International Lawyer | United States |
| Paul Nitze | Assistant Secretary for International Affairs, Department of Defense | United States |
| Johan Nykopp | Former Ambassador; General Manager of Tampella | Finland |
| Aurelio Peccei | Managing Director of Italconsult | Italy |
| Mario Pedini | Member of Parliament; Member of European Parliament | Italy |
| James A. Perkins | Vice-president of Carnegie Corporation; President-elect of Cornell University | United States |
| Max Petitpierre | Former President of Swiss Confederation | Switzerland |
| Jacques Piette | Civil Servant | France |
| Antoine Pinay | Former Prime Minister | France |
| Alberto Pirelli | Industrialist | Italy |
| René Pleven | Member of Parliament; Former Prime Minister | France |
| Pietro Quaroni | Ambassador to the United Kingdom | Italy |
| David Rockefeller | President, Chase Manhattan Bank | United States |
| Ivo Samkalden | Professor of International Law | Netherlands |
| Carlo Schmid | Vice-president, Federal Parliament | West Germany |
| Jacques Segard | Industrialist | France |
| René Sergent | Vice-president, Syndicat General de la Construction Electrique | France |
| Jean-Charles Snoy et d'Oppuers | Managing Director, Compagnie dOutremer pour Industrie et la Finance | Belgium |
| Paul-Henri Spaak | Minister of Foreign Affairs | Belgium |
| Charles Spofford | Lawyer; Former U.S. Representative on North Atlantic Council | United States |
| Christofore Stratos | Director, Cotton Industrie Piraiki-Patraiki | Greece |
| Terkel Terkelsen | Editor | Denmark |
| Mark Turner | Managing Director, Kleinwort Benson Ltd | United Kingdom |
| Pierre Uri | Consultant for the Conduct of Studies, Atlantic Institute | France |
| Marcus Wallenberg Jr. | Chairman, Federation of Swedish Industries | Sweden |
| Otto Wolff von Amerongen | Senior partner, Otto Wolff Koln | West Germany |
| Montague Christopher Woodhouse | Parliamentary Secretary to the Home Office | United Kingdom |

=== 1964 Conference ===
| Participants | Title | Nationality |
|---|---|---|
| Dean Acheson | Former Secretary of State | United States |
| Gianni Agnelli | Vice-chairman of the Board and Managing Director, FIAT Co. | Italy |
| George Ball | Under Secretary of State | United States |
| Jacques Baumel | Senator, Secretary General, Union pour la Nouvelle République | France |
| Wilfrid Baumgartner | Former Minister of Finance | France |
| Henrik Beer | Secretary General, League of Red Cross Societies | Sweden |
| Frederic Bennett | Member of Parliament | United Kingdom |
| Fritz Berg | President, Federation of German Industries | West Germany |
| Muharrem Nuri Birgi | Ambassador to NATO | Turkey |
| Kurt Birrenbach | Member of Parliament | West Germany |
| Max Brauer | Former Burgomaster of Hamburg; Member of Parliament | West Germany |
| Alastair Buchan | Director, International Institute for Strategic Studies | United Kingdom |
| McGeorge Bundy | Special Assistant to the President for National Security Affairs | United States |
| Louis Cabot | President, Cabot Corporation | United States |
| Walker Lee Cisler | Industrialist | United States |
| Emilio Collado | Vice President, Standard Oil Co. New Jersey | United States |
| Arthur Dean | International Lawyer and Diplomat | United States |
| Gaston Defferre | Department of National Assembly; Mayor of Marseille | France |
| James Duncan Jones | Company Director | Canada |
| Henry Scrymgeour-Wedderburn | Minister of State for Foreign Affairs | United Kingdom |
| Fritz Erler | Member of Parliament; Floor Leader Social-Democratic Party | West Germany |
| Gerald Ford | Congressman | United States |
| Peter Frelinghuysen | Congressman | United States |
| J. William Fulbright | Senator | United States |
| Pierre Gallois | General; Specialist in Nuclear Problems | France |
| Anthony Griffin | Banker | Canada |
| Colin Gubbins | Industrialist | United Kingdom |
| Per Hækkerup | Minister of Foreign Affairs | Denmark |
| Gabriel Hauge | President, Manufacturers Hanover Trust Company | United States |
| Denis Healey | Member of Parliament; Labour Party Spokesman on Defense | United Kingdom |
| Arnold Heeney | Former Ambassador to the United States; Chairman, International Joint Commission on Water Resources | Canada |
| Henry J. Heinz II | Chairman of the Board, Heinz Co. | United States |
| Christian A. Herter Jr. | Former Secretary of State; Special Representative for Trade Negotiations | United States |
| Leif Høegh | Shipowner, founder of Leif Höegh & Co | Norway |
| Chet Holifield | Congressman | United States |
| Charles D. Jackson | Senior Vice President, Time, Inc. | United States |
| Henry M. Jackson | Senator | United States |
| Jacob Javits | Senator | United States |
| George Jellicoe | First Lord of the Admiralty | United Kingdom |
| Kercho | Assistant, Ecole des Sciences Politiques et Sociales | Belgium |
| Henry Kissinger | Associate Professor, Harvard University Center for International Affairs | United States |
| Eelco van Kleffens | Chief Representative in the United Kingdom of the European Coal and Steel Community | Netherlands |
| Harald Kundtzon | General Manager, Den Danske Landmandsbank | Denmark |
| Max Kohnstamm | Vice president, Action Committee for a United States of Europe | Netherlands |
| Henri J. de Koster | President, Federation of Netherlands Industries | Netherlands |
| Franz Krapf | Chief of the Political Division, Ministry of Foreign Affairs | West Germany |
| Knut von Kühlmann-Stumm | Member of Parliament; Floor Leader of the Free Democratic Party | West Germany |
| Christian de La Malène | Member of Parliament; Member of European Parliament | France |
| Ugo La Malfa | Member of Parliament | Italy |
| Halvard Lange | Minister of Foreign Affairs | Norway |
| Emiel van Lennep | Chairman, Monetary Committee, EEC; Chairman, Working Party 3, OECD | Netherlands |
| Franklin A. Lindsay | President of Itek | United States |
| Jean de Lipkowski | Diplomat; Member of Parliament; Member of European Parliament | France |
| Lawrence Litchfield Jr. | Chairman of the Board, Aluminum Company of America (Alcoa) | United States |
| Ettore Lolli | Deputy General Manager, Banca Nazionale del Lavoro | Italy |
| Joseph Luns | Minister of Foreign Affairs | Netherlands |
| Ernst Majonica | Member of Parliament | West Germany |
| Franco Maria Malfatti | Under Secretary Ministry of Industry and Commerce | Italy |
| Sicco Mansholt | Vice President, EEC | Netherlands |
| John J. McCloy | Lawyer and Diplomat | United States |
| George C. McGhee | Ambassador to the Federal Republic of West Germany | United States |
| Johannes Meynen | Managing Director, AKU | Netherlands |
| Robert Daniel Murphy | President, Corning Glass International | United States |
| George Nebolsine | International Lawyer | United States |
| Johan Nykopp | Former Ambassador; President of Tampella | Finland |
| Lester B. Pearson | Prime Minister | Canada |
| Aurelio Peccei | Managing Director, Italconsult | Italy |
| Antoine Pinay | Former Prime Minister | France |
| David Rockefeller | President, Chase Manhattan Bank | United States |
| Eric Roll | Economic Minister at the British Embassy to the United States; Head of the UK Treasury and Supply Delegation | United Kingdom |
| Giovanni Scaglia | Member of Parliament; Vice Chairman, Christian Democratic Party | Italy |
| Carlo Schmid | Vice President, Federal Parliament | West Germany |
| Pierre-Paul Schweitzer | Managing Director, International Monetary Fund | France |
| Marshall D. Shulman | Research Associate, Russian Research Center, Harvard University; Professor of International, Politics, Fletcher School of Law and Diplomacy | United States |
| Harold Page Smith | Supreme Allied Commander of NATO | United States |
| Jean-Charles Snoy et d'Oppuers | Managing Director, Compagnie Internationale pour le Commerce et l'Industrie | Belgium |
| Hans Speidel | Special Adviser on Defense Matters | West Germany |
| Michael Stewart | Member of Parliament | United Kingdom |
| Dirk Stikker | Secretary General of NATO | Netherlands |
| Shepard Stone | Director, International Affairs Program, Ford Foundation | United States |
| Terkel Terkelsen | Chief Editor | Denmark |
| Victor Umbricht | Former Head of Swiss Treasury and Diplomat; President, Ciba Specialty Chemicals, New York | Switzerland |
| Paolo Vittorelli | Senator | Italy |
| Marcus Wallenberg Jr. | Chairman, Federation of Swedish Industries | Sweden |
| Ludger Westrick | Secretary of State, Office Federal Chancellor | West Germany |
| Robert Winters | Industrialist | Canada |
| Otto Wolff von Amerongen | Senior Partner, Otto Wolff Koln | West Germany |
| Walter Wriston | Executive Vice-president, First National City Bank | United States |
| Eric Wyndham White | Executive Secretary, GATT | United Kingdom |
| Princess Beatrix of the Netherlands | Dutch Crown Princess | Netherlands |
| Andreas E. van Braam Houckgeest | | Netherlands |
| Vittorino Chiusano | | Italy |
| Carlisle H. Humelsine | Former Assistant Secretary of State for Administration | United States |
| Alfred Mozer | | Belgium |
| Bertie le Roy | | Netherlands |

=== 1965 Conference ===
| Participants | Nationality |
|---|---|
| Gianni Agnelli | Italy |
| Hubert Ansiaux | Belgium |
| Charles Arliotis | Greece |
| Prodromos Bodosakis-Athanasiadis | Greece |
| George Ball | United States |
| Rainer Barzel | West Germany |
| Jacques Baumel | France |
| Wilfrid Baumgartner | France |
| Bjarni Benediktsson | Iceland |
| Frederic Bennett | United Kingdom |
| Fritz Berg | West Germany |
| Muharrem Nuri Birgi | Turkey |
| Pieter Blaisse | Netherlands |
| John Brademas | United States |
| Kingman Brewster Jr. | United States |
| Gerardo Broggini | Switzerland |
| Manlio Brosio | Italy |
| David K. E. Bruce | United States |
| Guido Carli | Italy |
| Eugenio Cefis | Italy |
| Emilio Collado | United States |
| Donald C. Cook | United States |
| Arthur Dean | United States |
| John James Deutsch | Canada |
| Hedley Donovan | United States |
| Nejat Eczacıbaşı | Turkey |
| Prince Philip, Duke of Edinburgh | United Kingdom |
| Otmar Emminger | West Germany |
| Fritz Erler | West Germany |
| Reay Geddes | United Kingdom |
| Anthony Griffin | Canada |
| Denis Healey | United Kingdom |
| Henry J. Heinz II | United States |
| Leif Høegh | Norway |
| Paul Huvelin | France |
| Harald Knudtzo | Denmark |
| Hans de Koster | Netherlands |
| Thorkil Kristensen | Denmark |
| Ugo La Malfa | Italy |
| Jean Lecanuet | France |
| Emiel van Lennep | Netherlands |
| John Lindsay | United States |
| John H. Loudon | Netherlands |
| Joseph Luns | Netherlands |
| Giovanni Malagodi | Italy |
| Robert Marjolin | France |
| Reginald Maudling | United Kingdom |
| John J. McCloy | United States |
| George C. McGhee | United States |
| Neil McKinnon | Canada |
| Johan A. Melander | Norway |
| Lord Mountbatten of Burma | United Kingdom |
| Ivar Norgaard | Denmark |
| Johan Nykopp | Finland |
| Olof Palme | Sweden |
| Mario Pedini | Italy |
| James A. Perkins | United States |
| Howard Petersen | United States |
| Giuseppe Petrilli | Italy |
| Panayotis Pipinelis | Greece |
| Leopoldo Pirelli | Italy |
| Hugo Portisch | Austria |
| Eberhard Reinhardt | Switzerland |
| James Reston | United States |
| Henry Reuss | United States |
| David Rockefeller | United States |
| Robert V. Roosa | United States |
| Mariano Rumor | Italy |
| Ivo Samkalden | Netherlands |
| Paul A. Samuelson | United States |
| Maurice Sauve | Canada |
| Karl Schiller | West Germany |
| Adolph W. Schmidt | United States |
| Pierre-Paul Schweitzer | France |
| Baron Snoy et dOppuers | Belgium |
| Shepard Stone | United States |
| Dick Taverne | United Kingdom |
| Terkel M. Terkelsen | Denmark |
| Paolo Vittorelli | Italy |
| Marcus Wallenberg | Sweden |
| Siegmund Warburg | United Kingdom |
| Otto Wolff von Amerongen | West Germany |
| Princess Beatrix | Netherlands |
| A. Egbert van Braam Houckgeest | Netherlands |
| Marchese Jean Gaspare Cittadini Cesi | Italy |
| Vittorino Chiusano | Italy |
| Bertie le Roy | Netherlands |
| Edwin Vernede | Netherlands |

=== 1966 Conference ===
| Participants | Nationality |
|---|---|
| Hermann Josef Abs | West Germany |
| Gianni Agnelli | Italy |
| Raymond Aron | France |
| George Ball | United States |
| Piero Bassetti | Italy |
| Wilfrid Baumgartner | France |
| David E. Bell | United States |
| Frederic Bennett | United Kingdom |
| Fritz Berg | West Germany |
| Muharrem Nuri Birgi | Turkey |
| Kurt Birrenbach | West Germany |
| Robert R. Bowie | United States |
| Manlio Brosio | Italy |
| Zbigniew Brzezinski | United States |
| Alastair Buchan | United Kingdom |
| Marcel Cadieux | Canada |
| Louis Camu | Belgium |
| Andrew Cohen | United Kingdom |
| Emilio G. Collado | United States |
| Auguste Cool | Belgium |
| Arthur Dean | United States |
| Davidson Dunton | Canada |
| Ludwig Erhard | West Germany |
| Fritz Erler | West Germany |
| Manuel R. Espirito Santo Silva | Portugal |
| Marcel Faribault | Canada |
| Max Frankel | United States |
| Jacques Georges-Picot | France |
| Roswell Gilpatric | United States |
| Anthony Griffin | Canada |
| Fred R. Harris | United States |
| Gabriel Hauge | United States |
| Henry J. Heinz II | United States |
| Leif Høegh | Norway |
| Chet Holifield | United States |
| Thomas V. Jones | United States |
| Cyril Kleinwort | United Kingdom |
| Harald Knudtzon | Denmark |
| Jens Otto Krag | Denmark |
| Halvard Lange | Norway |
| Jean Lecanuet | France |
| Joseph Luns | Netherlands |
| Franco Maria Malfatti | Italy |
| Edward S. Mason | United States |
| John J. McCloy | United States |
| James McCormack | United States |
| George C. McGhee | United States |
| Hans Merkle | West Germany |
| F. Bradford Morse | United States |
| Robert Daniel Murphy | United States |
| Johan Nykopp | Finland |
| Con O'Neill | United Kingdom |
| Mario Pedini | Italy |
| Rudolph A. Peterson | United States |
| Hugo Portisch | Austria |
| Walter Reuther | United States |
| David Rockefeller | United States |
| Eric Roll | United Kingdom |
| Carlo Schmid | West Germany |
| Helmut Schmidt | West Germany |
| Urs Schwarz | Switzerland |
| Jean-Charles Snoy et d'Oppuers | Belgium |
| Charles Spofford | United States |
| Gerhard Stoltenberg | West Germany |
| Shepard Stone | United States |
| Terkel Terkelsen | Denmark |
| Gunnar Thoroddsen | Iceland |
| Jan Tinbergen | Netherlands |
| John W. Tuthill | United States |
| Marcus Wallenberg Jr. | Sweden |
| Charles Wheeler | United Kingdom |
| Robert Winters | Canada |
| Otto Wolff von Amerongen | West Germany |
| George David Woods | United States |
| Eric Wyndham White | United Kingdom |
| Jelle Zijlstra | Netherlands |
| Vittorino Chiusano | Italy |
| Bertie le Roy | Netherlands |
| Edwin Vernede | Netherlands |
| Michael von Waldthausen | West Germany |

=== 1967 Conference ===
| Participants | Nationality |
|---|---|
| Gianni Agnelli | Italy |
| Charles Arliotis | Greece |
| George Ball | United States |
| David Barran | United Kingdom |
| Jacques Baumel | France |
| Wilfrid Baumgartner | France |
| Kurt Becker | West Germany |
| Fritz Beebe | United States |
| Frederic Bennett | United Kingdom |
| Muharrem Nuri Birgi | Turkey |
| Kurt Birrenbach | West Germany |
| Manlio Brosio | Italy |
| Jean Casanova | France |
| Harold van B. Cleveland | United States |
| Harlan Cleveland | United States |
| Emilio Collado | United States |
| Guido Colonna di Paliano | Italy |
| Piet Dankert | Netherlands |
| Arthur Dean | United States |
| John Diebold | United States |
| James Eayrs | Canada |
| Prince Philip, Duke of Edinburgh | United Kingdom |
| Mario Ferrari Aggradi | Italy |
| Anthony Griffin | Canada |
| Arnold Alexander Hall | United Kingdom |
| Henri Hartung | France |
| Denis Healey | United Kingdom |
| Edward Heath | United Kingdom |
| Henry J. Heinz II | United States |
| Leif Høegh | Norway |
| Stanley Hoffmann | United States |
| Quintin Hogg | United Kingdom |
| Yngve Holmberg | Sweden |
| Donald Hornig | United States |
| Henry M. Jackson | United States |
| Carl Kaysen | United States |
| Frank Kearton | United Kingdom |
| Antonie Knoppers | United States |
| Max Kohnstamm | Netherlands |
| Joseph Kraf | United States |
| Jaap Kymmell | Netherlands |
| Théo Lefèvre | Belgium |
| Jules Léger | Canada |
| Joseph Luns | Netherlands |
| Paul Martin | Canada |
| Charles McC. Mathias Jr. | United States |
| Niels Matthiasen | Denmark |
| Reginald Maudling | United Kingdom |
| George C. McGhee | United States |
| John T. McNaughton | United States |
| Hans Merkle | West Germany |
| Bill Moyers | United States |
| Preben Munthe | Norway |
| Robert Daniel Murphy | United States |
| Prince Claus of the Netherlands | Netherlands |
| John Newhouse | United States |
| Stavros Niarchos | Greece |
| Alberto Franco Nogueire | Portugal |
| Lauris Norstad | United States |
| Johan Nykopp | Finland |
| Aurelio Peccei | Italy |
| James Alfred Perkins | United States |
| Yiangos Pesmazoglou | Greece |
| Piet Gerards | United States |
| Emanuel R. Piore | United States |
| Leopoldo Pirelli | Italy |
| David Rockefeller | United States |
| Eric Roll | United Kingdom |
| Eugene V. Rostow. | United States |
| Ambroise Roux | France |
| Helmut Schmidt | West Germany |
| Urs Schwarz | Switzerland |
| Hartley Shawcross | United Kingdom |
| Henri Simonet | Belgium |
| Jean-Charles Snoy et d'Oppuers | Belgium |
| Svend Sorensen | Denmark |
| Shepard Stone | United States |
| Dick Taverne | United Kingdom |
| Terkel Terkelsen | Denmark |
| Otto Grieg Tidemand | Norway |
| Ludovic Tron | France |
| Berend J. Udink | Netherlands |
| Paolo Battino Vittorelli | Italy |
| Marcus Wallenberg Jr. | Sweden |
| Charles Wheeler | United Kingdom |
| Hermann Withalm | Austria |
| Otto Wolff von Amerongen | West Germany |
| Vittorino Chiusano | Italy |
| Richard Munby | United Kingdom |
| Bertie le Roy | Netherlands |
| Carel J. van Schelle | Netherlands |
| Edwin Vernede | Netherlands |

=== 1968 Conference ===
| Participants | Nationality |
|---|---|
| Gianni Agnelli | Italy |
| Jean Victor Allard | Canada |
| Egon Bahr | West Germany |
| George Ball | United States |
| Wilfrid Baumgartner | France |
| Leonard Beaton | Canada |
| Michel Bélanger | Canada |
| Bjarni Benediktsson | Iceland |
| Frederic Bennett | United Kingdom |
| Fritz Berg | West Germany |
| Barend Biesheuvel | Netherlands |
| Muharrem Nuri Birgi | Turkey |
| Kurt Birrenbach | West Germany |
| Alan R. Booth | International |
| Maurice Bridgeman | United States |
| Zbigniew Brzezinski | United States |
| Alastair Francis Buchan | United Kingdom |
| Louis Camu | Belgium |
| Paul Chambers | United Kingdom |
| Emilio Collado | United States |
| Arthur Dean | United States |
| Frederick Deming | United States |
| C. Douglas Dillon | United States |
| William S. Dodge | Canada |
| Henry Ford II | United States |
| Jacques de Fouchier | France |
| Thomas S. Gates Jr. | United States |
| Anthony Griffin | Canada |
| Henri Hartung | France |
| Gabriel Hauge | United States |
| Henry Hauge | United States |
| Leif Høegh | Norway |
| John Wendell Holmes | Canada |
| Henry M. Jackson | United States |
| Christian F. Karsten | Netherlands |
| Ward Keener | United States |
| Pieter Kuin | Netherlands |
| Allen Lambert | Canada |
| Paul Lendvai | Austria |
| Richard Löwenthal | West Germany |
| Björn Lundvall | Sweden |
| Joseph Luns | Netherlands |
| Paul Martin | Canada |
| Charles McC. Mathias | United States |
| William McLean Hamilton | Canada |
| Robert McNamara | United States |
| Pierre Mendès France | France |
| Karl Mommer | West Germany |
| Bill Moyers | United States |
| Robert Daniel Murphy | United States |
| Prince Claus of the Netherlands | Netherlands |
| Stavros Niarchos | Greece |
| Alberto F. Nogueira | Portugal |
| Johan Nykopp | Finland |
| Roberto Olivetti | Italy |
| Duncan Oppenheim | United Kingdom |
| Jacques Parizeau | Canada |
| Lester B. Pearson | Canada |
| Aurelio Peccei | Italy |
| James Alfred Perkins | United States |
| Leopoldo Pirelli | Italy |
| Enoch Powell | United Kingdom |
| Louis Rasminsky | Canada |
| Ron Ritchie | Canada |
| David Rockefeller | United States |
| Alberto Ronchey | Italy |
| Edmond Adolphe de Rothschild | France |
| Claude Ryan | Canada |
| John T. Ryan | United States |
| Herman Sandberg | Netherlands |
| Andrew Shonfield | United Kingdom |
| Jean-Charles Snoy et d'Oppuers | Belgium |
| Jacques Solvay | Belgium |
| Svend O. Sorensen | Denmark |
| Dieter Spethmann | West Germany |
| Altiero Spinelli | Italy |
| Ugo Stille | Italy |
| Shepard Stone | United States |
| Dick Taverne | United Kingdom |
| Terkel Terkelsen | Denmark |
| Albert Thornbrough | Canada |
| Otto Grieg Tidemand | Norway |
| Pierre Trudeau | Canada |
| İlter Türkmen | Turkey |
| Victor Umbricht | Switzerland |
| Vernon Raymond | United States |
| Willem Visser 't Hooft | Netherlands |
| Otto Wolff von Amerongen | West Germany |
| Bertie le Roy | Netherlands |
| Bernard Thillaye | Canada |
| Edwin Vernede | Netherlands |

=== 1969 Conference ===
| Participants | Nationality |
|---|---|
| Gianni Agnelli | Italy |
| Michel Albert | France |
| Rüdiger Altmann | West Germany |
| George Ball | United States |
| Wilfrid Baumgartner | France |
| Daniel Bell | United States |
| Bjarni Benediktsson | Iceland |
| Frederic Bennett | United Kingdom |
| Godfried van Benthem van den Bergh | Netherlands |
| Walter Berchtold | Switzerland |
| Muharrem Nuri Birgi | Turkey |
| Claude Bissell | Canada |
| Edward Brooke | United States |
| Marcel Cadieux | Canada |
| Antonio Cariglia | Italy |
| Fabio Luca Cavazza | Italy |
| Emilio Collado | United States |
| Karl Czernetz | Austria |
| Ralf Dahrendorf | West Germany |
| Arthur Dean | United States |
| Prince Henrik of Denmark | Denmark |
| François Duchêne | United Kingdom |
| Kjell-Olof Feldt | Sweden |
| François Fontaine | France |
| Johannes Green | Denmark |
| Anthony Griffin | Canada |
| Denis Hamilton | United Kingdom |
| Edward K. Hamilton | United States |
| Poul Hartling | Denmark |
| Gabriel Hauge | United States |
| Edward Heath | United Kingdom |
| Henry J. Heinz II | United States |
| Jerome Heldring | Netherlands |
| Leif Hoegh | Norway |
| Daniel Janssen | Belgium |
| Vernon E. Jordan Jr. | United States |
| Jens Kampmann | Denmark |
| Kenneth Keniston | United States |
| Hans H. Koch | Denmark |
| Max Kohnstamm | Netherlands |
| Jens Otto Krag | Denmark |
| Peter F. Krogh | United States |
| Halvard M. Lange | Norway |
| Lars R. Langslet | Norway |
| Paul Lendvai | Austria |
| Jens Litten | West Germany |
| Fred Luchsinger | Switzerland |
| Joseph Luns | Netherlands |
| Mærsk Mc-Kinney Møller | Denmark |
| Marshall McLuhan | Canada |
| Robert McNamara | United States |
| David A. Morse | International |
| Bill Moyers | United States |
| Prince Claus of the Netherlands | Netherlands |
| Johan Nykopp | Finland |
| Piero Ottone | Italy |
| Olivier Reverdin | Switzerland |
| Elliot Richardson | United States |
| Manfred E. Ritterbach | West Germany |
| Frank Roberts | United Kingdom |
| David Rockefeller | United States |
| Eric Roll | United Kingdom |
| Edmond Adolphe de Rothschild | France |
| Dean Rusk | United States |
| Kaare Sandegren | Norway |
| Jorgen Schleimann | Denmark |
| Norbert Schmelzer | Netherlands |
| Helmut Schmidt | West Germany |
| S. O. Sorensen | Denmark |
| Andre de Staercke | Belgium |
| Shepard Stone | United States |
| Terkel Terkelsen | Denmark |
| Otto Tidemand | Norway |
| Marc Ullmann | France |
| Victor Umbricht | Switzerland |
| Pierre Uri | France |
| Gancia Vallarino Lorenzo | Italy |
| Gerrit Wagner | Netherlands |
| Marcus Wallenberg Jr. | Sweden |
| Michel Woitrin | Belgium |
| Otto Wolff von Amerongen | West Germany |
| Paul Ylvisaker | United States |
| Henrik Jan van Asbeck | Netherlands |
| Marchese Gian G. Cittadini Cesi | Italy |
| Ole Marott | Denmark |
| Bertie Roy le | Netherlands |
| Edwin Vernede | Netherlands |

=== 1970 Conference ===
| Participants | Nationality |
|---|---|
| Gianni Agnelli | Italy |
| Michel Alliot | France |
| Graham Allison | United States |
| Renato Altissimo | Italy |
| Eric Ashby | United Kingdom |
| George Ball | United States |
| Wilfrid Baumgartner | France |
| Bjarni Benediktsson | Iceland |
| Frederic Bennett | United Kingdom |
| Walter Bechtold | Switzerland |
| Gilberto Bernardini | Italy |
| Hubert Beuve-Méry | France |
| Muharrem Nuri Birgi | Turkey |
| Laurens Jan Brinkhorst | Netherlands |
| L. E. Jan Brouwer | Netherlands |
| W.L. Brugsma | Netherlands |
| Louis Camu | Belgium |
| Emilio Collado | United States |
| Daniel Cornu | Switzerland |
| John Culver | United States |
| Arthur Dean | United States |
| Gaston Deurinck | Belgium |
| Eric Drake | United Kingdom |
| François Duchêne | United Kingdom |
| Ron Edwards | United Kingdom |
| Dante Fascell | United States |
| Edgar Faure | France |
| Gérard Filion | Canada |
| Franz Froschmaier | International |
| Kurt Furgler | Switzerland |
| Andreas Gerwig | Switzerland |
| Olivier Giscard d'Estaing | France |
| Andrew Goodpaster | International |
| Anthony Griffin | Canada |
| Roy Hattersley | United Kingdom |
| Gabriel Hauge | United States |
| Ivan Head | Canada |
| Henry J. Heinz II | United States |
| Leif Høegh | Norway |
| Stuart Holland | United Kingdom |
| Daniel Janssen | Belgium |
| Vernon Jordan | United States |
| Karl Kaiser | West Germany |
| Francis Keppel | United States |
| Alexander King | United Kingdom |
| Antonie Knoppers | United States |
| Max Kohnstamm | Netherlands |
| Peter F. Krogh | United States |
| Lars Langslet | Norway |
| Emiel van Lennep | Netherlands |
| Douglas LePan | Canada |
| Henri Lesguillons | France |
| Arrigo Levi | Italy |
| Pierre Liotard-Vogt | Switzerland |
| Seymour Martin Lipset | United States |
| Joseph Luns | Netherlands |
| Bernard Mach | Switzerland |
| Charles Mathias | United States |
| Reginald Maudling | United Kingdom |
| Martin Meyerson | United States |
| Sven Moberg | Sweden |
| Bill Moyers | United States |
| Alberto F. Nogueira | Portugal |
| Johan Nykopp | Finland |
| Nils Ørvik | Norway |
| Christopher Price | United Kingdom |
| Eberhard Reinhardt | Switzerland |
| Joseph Rhodes Jr. | United States |
| Elliot Richardson | United States |
| John Roberts | Canada |
| David Rockefeller | United States |
| John D.Rockefeller IV | United States |
| Eric Roll | United Kingdom |
| Edmond Adolphe de Rothschild | France |
| Alfred Schaefer | Switzerland |
| Max Schmidheiny | Switzerland |
| Robert B. Silvers | United States |
| Svend O. Sorensen | Denmark |
| Gerhard Stoltenberg | West Germany |
| Shepard Stone | United States |
| Georges Streichenberg | Switzerland |
| Terkel Terkelsen | Denmark |
| Otto Grieg Tidemand | Norway |
| Hans Tschudi | Switzerland |
| Victor Umbricht | Switzerland |
| Cyrus Vance | United States |
| Georges Vedel | France |
| Marcus Wallenberg Jr. | Sweden |
| Klaus Waris | Finland |
| Richard von Weizsäcker | West Germany |
| Otto Wolff von Amerongen | West Germany |
| Marchese Gian G. Cittadini Cesi | Italy |
| Paul Reutlinger | Switzerland |
| Bertie le Roy | Netherlands |
| Edwin Vernede | Netherlands |

=== 1971 Conference ===
| Participants | Nationality |
|---|---|
| Graham Allison | United States |
| Robert Orville Anderson | United States |
| Andre Aumonier | France |
| Egon Bahr | West Germany |
| George Ball | United States |
| Wilfrid Baumgartner | France |
| Karl Bendetsen | United States |
| Ingemund Bengtsson | Sweden |
| Frederic Bennett | United Kingdom |
| Selahattin Beyazıt | Turkey |
| Muharrem Nuri Birgi | Turkey |
| Robert Bourassa | Canada |
| Karl Carstens | West Germany |
| Raymond H. A. Carter | France |
| Karl Casserini | Switzerland |
| Frederick Catherwood | United Kingdom |
| Marchese Gian G. Cittadini Cesi | Italy |
| John Cockcroft | United Kingdom |
| Emilio G. Collado | United States |
| John J. Carson | United States |
| Arthur Dean | United States |
| François Duchêne | United Kingdom |
| John Thomas Dunlop | United States |
| Donald Duster | United States |
| Osborn Elliott | United States |
| Ralph Enckell | Finland |
| Donald M. Fraser | United States |
| Peter Frelinghuysen Jr. | United States |
| Emanuele Gazzo | Italy |
| Giuseppe Glisenti | Italy |
| Ronald Grierson | United Kingdom |
| Anthony Griffin | Canada |
| Gabriel Hauge | United States |
| Denis Healey | United Kingdom |
| Henry J. Heinz II | United States |
| Leif Høegh | Norway |
| Thomas L. Hughes | United States |
| Peter Idenburg | Netherlands |
| Adolf Jann | Switzerland |
| Daniel Janssen | Belgium |
| Jacob Albert Carl Gustaf von Julin | Finland |
| Karl Kaiser | West Germany |
| Henry Kissinger | United States |
| Cyril Kleinwort | United Kingdom |
| Max Kohnstamm | Netherlands |
| Gualtherus Kraijenhoff | Netherlands |
| Leo Lambert | Belgium |
| Paul Leman | Canada |
| Joseph Luns | Netherlands |
| Donald Stovel Macdonald | Canada |
| Gordon J. F. MacDonald | United States |
| Ian MacGregor | United States |
| Gilles Martinet | France |
| Reginald Maudling | United Kingdom |
| Hans Merkle | West Germany |
| Gian Migone | Italy |
| Bill Moyers | United States |
| Prince Claus of the Netherlands | Netherlands |
| Piero Ottone | Italy |
| Robert Pease | United States |
| James Alfred Perkins | United States |
| Gianfranco Piazzesi | Italy |
| Henry S. Reuss | United States |
| Donald Riegle | United States |
| David Rockefeller | United States |
| John D. Rockefeller IV | United States |
| Eric Roll | United Kingdom |
| Edmond Adolphe de Rothschild | France |
| Abraham Rotstein | Canada |
| Jorgen Schleimann | Denmark |
| Gerhard Schröder | West Germany |
| Henri Simonet | Belgium |
| Joseph E. Slater | United States |
| Svend O. Sorensen | Denmark |
| Andre Spoor | Netherlands |
| Howard Stein | United States |
| Adlai Stevenson III | United States |
| Shepard Stone | United States |
| Terkel Terkelsen | Denmark |
| George Thomson | United Kingdom |
| Otto Grieg Tidemand | Norway |
| John W. Tuthill | United States |
| Victor Umbricht | Switzerland |
| August A. J. Vanistendael | Belgium |
| John W. Vogt Jr. | United States |
| Marcus Wallenberg Jr. | Sweden |
| Hans-Jürgen Wischnewski | West Germany |
| Otto Wolff von Amerongen | West Germany |
| Roger Stone | United States |
| Edwin Vernede | Netherlands |

=== 1972 Conference ===
| Participants | Nationality |
|---|---|
| Gianni Agnelli | Italy |
| Hans Arnold | Germany |
| George Ball | United States |
| Wilfrid Baumgartner | France |
| Frederic Bennett | United Kingdom |
| C. Fred Bergsten | United States |
| Selahattin Beyazıt | Turkey |
| Muharrem Nuri Birgii | Turkey |
| Kurt Birrenbach | Germany |
| W. Michael Blumenthal | United States |
| Andrew Brimmer | United States |
| Neil Brown | Australia |
| John C. Browne | United Kingdom |
| Zbigniew Brzezinski | United States |
| Alastair Buchan | United Kingdom |
| Miriam Camp | United States |
| Louis Camu | Belgium |
| Cittadini Cesi | Italy |
| Emilio Collado | United States |
| Umberto Colombo | Italy |
| Guido Colonna di Paliano | Italy |
| Peter Corterier | Germany |
| John Culver | United States |
| Ralf Dahrendorf | United Kingdom |
| Michel David-Weill | France |
| Étienne Davignon | Belgium |
| Arthur Dean | United States |
| Jean-François Deniau | France |
| Marion Dönhoff | Germany |
| Roberto Ducci | Italy |
| Anton F. J. Dijkgraaf | Netherlands |
| Manuel Espirito Santo Silva | Portugal |
| Thomas Fleener | Switzerland |
| Anthony Griffin | Canada |
| Françoise Giroud | France |
| Geir Hallgrímsson | Iceland |
| Gabriel Hauge | United States |
| Henry J. Heinz II | United States |
| Leif Høegh | Norway |
| Maria J. 't Hooft | Netherlands |
| Amory Houghton | United States |
| Thomas L. Hughes | United States |
| Daniel Janssen | Belgium |
| Paul E. Janssen | Belgium |
| Paul Jolles | Switzerland |
| Frank Kearton | United Kingdom |
| Max Kohnstamm | Netherlands |
| Henri J. de Koster | Netherlands |
| Léon Lambert | Belgium |
| Emiel van Lennep | Netherlands |
| Harold Lever | United Kingdom |
| Arrigo Levi | Italy |
| John Hugo Loudon | Netherlands |
| Joseph Luns | Netherlands |
| Roy MacLaren | Canada |
| Bayless Manning | United States |
| Charles Mathias | United States |
| William McLean Hamilton | Canada |
| Johannes Meynen | Netherlands |
| Robert Daniel Murphy | United States |
| Beatrix of the Netherlands | Netherlands |
| Prince Claus of the Netherlands | Netherlands |
| Alberto Franco Nogueira | Portugal |
| Simon Nora | France |
| Niels Norlund | Denmark |
| Johan Nykopp | Finland |
| Schelto Patijn | Netherlands |
| Benjamin F. Payton | United States |
| James Alfred Perkins | United States |
| André Raynauld | Canada |
| William Rees-Mogg | United Kingdom |
| Olivier Reverdin | Switzerland |
| Jean Riboud | France |
| David Rockefeller | United States |
| Eric Roll | United Kingdom |
| Edmond Adolphe de Rothschild | France |
| Yves Sabouret | France |
| Robert A. Scalapino | United States |
| Robert Schaetzel | United States |
| Gerhard Schröder | Germany |
| Helge Seip | Norway |
| Jean-Charles Snoy et d'Oppuers | Belgium |
| Jacques Solvay | Belgium |
| Svend O. Sorensen | Denmark |
| Shepard Stone | United States |
| Shirley Summerskill | United Kingdom |
| Michel Tatu | France |
| Arthur R. Taylor | United States |
| Terkel Terkelsen | Denmark |
| Otto Grieg Tidemand | Norway |
| Victor Umbricht | Switzerland |
| Robert Vandeputte | Belgium |
| Gerrit Wagner | Netherlands |
| Marcus Wallenberg Jr. | Sweden |
| Jack H. Warren | Canada |
| Alan Westerman | Australia |
| Otto Wolff von Amerongen | Germany |
| Jelle Zijlstra | Netherlands |
| Elmo Zumwalt | United States |
| L.Hulhoven | Belgium |
| E. Verned | Netherlands |
| Jan Tonny Warmenhoven | Netherlands |
| Eugene M. Getchell, Jr. | United States |
| Ernst van der Beugel | Netherlands |

=== 1973 Conference ===
| Participants | Nationality |
|---|---|
| Gianni Agnelli | Italy |
| Robert Orville Anderson | United States |
| George Ball | United States |
| Wilfrid Baumgartner | France |
| Frederic Bennett | United Kingdom |
| Selahattin Beyazıt | Turkey |
| Muharrem Nuri Birgi | Turkey |
| Erling Bjol | Denmark |
| Anders Björgerd | Sweden |
| Marcel Boiteux | France |
| Birgit Breuel | Germany |
| Zbigniew Brzezinski | United States |
| William Bundy | United States |
| Cittadini Cesi | Italy |
| Emilio Collado | United States |
| Arthur Dean | United States |
| Eric Drake | United Kingdom |
| Roberto Ducci | Italy |
| Raffaele Girotti | Italy |
| Rene Granier de Lilliac | France |
| Denis Greenhill | United Kingdom |
| Anthony Griffin | Canada |
| Niels Haagerup | Denmark |
| Geir Hallgrímsson | Iceland |
| Denis Healey | United Kingdom |
| Henry J. Heinz | United States |
| Leif Høegh | Norway |
| Jozef Houthuys | Belgium |
| Daniel Janssen | Belgium |
| Otto Kersten | Germany |
| Max Kohnstamm | Netherlands |
| Lewis H. Lapham | United States |
| Sakari T. Lehto | Finland |
| Emiel van Lennep | Netherlands |
| Walter J. Levy | United States |
| Finn Lied | Norway |
| Siro Lombardini | Italy |
| Joseph Luns | Netherlands |
| Peter Lougheed | Canada |
| Donald Stovel Macdonald | Canada |
| Reginald Maudling | United Kingdom |
| Cesare Merlini | Italy |
| Erich Mettler | Switzerland |
| Bill Moyers | United States |
| John Newhouse | United States |
| David Owen | United Kingdom |
| Olof Palme | Sweden |
| James Alfred Perkins | United States |
| Frits Philips | Netherlands |
| Edgar Ritchie | Canada |
| Eric Roll | United Kingdom |
| Edmond Adolphe de Rothschild | France |
| Samuel Rozemond | Netherlands |
| Helmut Schmidt | Germany |
| Roger Seydoux de Clausonne | France |
| John M. Simon | United Kingdom |
| Gerard C. Smith | United States |
| Jean-Charles Snoy et d'Oppuers | Belgium |
| Theo Sommer | Germany |
| Fernand Spaak | Belgium |
| Paul Stehlin | France |
| Ugo Stille | Italy |
| Thorvald Stoltenberg | Norway |
| Shepard Stone | United States |
| Gunnar Sträng | Sweden |
| Richard Taverner | United Kingdom |
| Terkel Terkelsen | Denmark |
| Otto Grieg Tidemand | Norway |
| Berend Udink | Netherlands |
| Victor Umbricht | Switzerland |
| Gerrit Wagner | Netherlands |
| Marcus Wallenberg Jr. | Sweden |
| Krister Wickman | Sweden |
| Carroll L. Wilson | United States |
| Hans-Jürgen Wischnewski | Germany |
| Otto Wolff von Amerongen | Germany |
| Nils Svensson | Sweden |
| Hugo Lindgren | Sweden |
| Edwin Vernede | Netherlands |
| Charles W. Getchell Jr. | United States |

=== 1974 Conference ===
| Participants | Nationality |
|---|---|
| Gianni Agnelli | Italy |
| John Black Aird | Canada |
| Graham Allison | United States |
| Hervé Alphand | France |
| K. B. Andersen | Denmark |
| Hannes Androsch | Austria |
| George Ball | United States |
| Wilfrid Baumgartner | France |
| Frederic Bennett | United Kingdom |
| C. Fred Bergsten | United States |
| Enzo Bettiza | Italy |
| Selahattin Beyazıt | Turkey |
| Muharrem Nuri Birgi | Turkey |
| Laurens Jan Brinkhorst | Netherlands |
| Miriam Camp | United States |
| James Chace | United States |
| Albin Chalandon | France |
| Mariano Cittadini | Italy |
| Emilio Collado | United States |
| Guido Colonna di Paliano | Italy |
| Ralf Dahrendorf | International |
| Étienne Davignon | Belgium |
| Roberto Ducci | Italy |
| Michel Dupuy | Canada |
| Edgar Faure | France |
| Lucie Faure | France |
| André Fontaine | France |
| Frank Giles | United Kingdom |
| Andrew Goodpaster | United States |
| Denis Greenhill | United Kingdom |
| Anthony Griffin | Canada |
| Henry A. Grunwald | United States |
| Guillaume Guindey | France |
| Gabriel Hauge | United States |
| Denis Healey | United Kingdom |
| Henry J. Heinz II | United States |
| Maurice Herzog | France |
| Leif Høegh | Norway |
| Hans Igler | Austria |
| Daniel Janssen | Belgium |
| Aubrey Jones | United Kingdom |
| Poul Louis Justman Jacob | Netherlands |
| Karl Kaiser | Germany |
| Walther Leisler Kiep | Germany |
| Max Kohnstamm | Netherlands |
| Giorgio La Malfa | Italy |
| Rene Larre | France |
| Emiel van Lennep | Netherlands |
| Louis Leprince-Ringuet | France |
| Arrigo Levi | Italy |
| Walter J. Levy | United States |
| Pierre Liotard-Vogt | Switzerland |
| Robert Winston | United States |
| Joseph Luns | International |
| Franco Maria Malfatti | Italy |
| Charles Mathias | United States |
| Walter Mondale | United States |
| Claude Monnier | Switzerland |
| Ole Myrvoll | Norway |
| Beatrix of the Netherlands | Netherlands |
| James Alfred Perkins | United States |
| Yiangos Pesmazoglou | Greece |
| Geoffrey Rippon | United Kingdom |
| Bill Rodgers | United Kingdom |
| David Rockefeller | United States |
| Nelson Rockefeller | United States |
| Eric Roll | United Kingdom |
| Alberto Ronchey | Italy |
| Reino Rossi | Finland |
| Edmond Adolphe de Rothschild | France |
| Jeanne Sauvé | Canada |
| Jorgen Schleimann | Denmark |
| Helmut Schmidt | Germany |
| Gerhard Schröder | Germany |
| Jean-Charles Snoy et d'Oppuers | Belgium |
| Theo Sommer | Germany |
| Helmut Sonnenfeldt | United States |
| Shepard Stone | United States |
| Terkel Terkelsen | Denmark |
| Gerald L. Thompson | United Kingdom |
| Otto Grieg Tidemand | Norway |
| Victor Umbricht | Switzerland |
| Marcus Wallenberg Jr. | Sweden |
| Krister Wickman | Sweden |
| Hans-Jürgen Wischnewski | Germany |
| Otto Wolff von Amerongen | Germany |
| Charles W. Getchell, Jr | United States |
| Robert Pitti-Ferrandi | France |
| Eduard Vernede | Netherlands |
| Jan Tonny Warmenhoven | Netherlands |

=== 1975 Conference ===
| Participants | Nationality |
|---|---|
| Gianni Agnelli | Italy |
| Semih Akbil | Turkey |
| Jacques Attali | France |
| George Ball | United States |
| Kurt Becker | Germany |
| Frederic Bennett | United Kingdom |
| Selahattin Beyazıt | Turkey |
| Muharrem Nuri Birgi | Turkey |
| Zbigniew Brzezinski | United States |
| William F. Buckley Jr. | United States |
| İhsan Sabri Çağlayangil | Turkey |
| Louis Camu | Belgium |
| Guido Carli | Italy |
| Diomede Catroux | France |
| Cittadini Cesi | Italy |
| Emilio Collado | United States |
| Richard Cooper | United States |
| Alfons Dalma | Austria |
| Arthur Dean | United States |
| John M. Deutch | Canada |
| İhsan Doğramacı | Turkey |
| Klaus von Dohnanyi | Germany |
| Roberto Ducci | Italy |
| Bülent Ecevit | Turkey |
| Turhan Feyzioğlu | Turkey |
| Garret FitzGerald | Ireland |
| Forte, Francesco | Italy |
| Curt Gasteyger | Switzerland |
| Herbert Giersch | Germany |
| Oğuz Gökmen | Turkey |
| Duncan L. Gordon | Canada |
| Johan M. Goudszwaard | Netherlands |
| Anthony Griffin | Canada |
| Erich Gysling | Switzerland |
| Victor Halberstadt | Netherlands |
| Arnold Hall | United Kingdom |
| Arthur A. Hartman | United States |
| Denis Healey | United Kingdom |
| Henry J. Heinz II | United States |
| Theodore Hesburgh | United States |
| Odd Højdahl | Norway |
| John Horam | United Kingdom |
| Jozef Houthuys | Belgium |
| Robert W. Hubner | United States |
| Hans Igler | Austria |
| Kâmran İnan | Turkey |
| Hasan E. Işık | Turkey |
| Max Jakobson | Finland |
| Daniel Janssen | Belgium |
| Gülten Kazgan | Turkey |
| Walther Leisler Kiep | Germany |
| Andrew Knight | United Kingdom |
| Max Kohnstamm | Netherlands |
| Giorgio La Malfa | Italy |
| Léon Lambert | Belgium |
| Emiel van Lennep | Netherlands |
| Arrigo Levi | Italy |
| Karl Lorck | Norway |
| Björn Lundvall | Sweden |
| Joseph Luns | Netherlands |
| William A. Macdonald | United States |
| Charles Mathias | United States |
| Paul McCracken | United States |
| Robert McNamara | United States |
| Thierry de Montbrial | France |
| Joseph Morris | Canada |
| James A. Perkins, J | United States |
| Joel Pritchard | United States |
| Gordon Richardson | United Kingdom |
| David Rockefeller | United States |
| Eric Roll | United Kingdom |
| Robert Roosa | United States |
| Edmond Adolphe de Rothschild | France |
| Donald Rumsfeld | United States |
| Henri Simonet | Belgium |
| Jean-Charles Snoy et d'Oppuers | Belgium |
| Theo Sommer | Germany |
| Svend Sorensen | Denmark |
| Lionel Stoléru | France |
| Shepard Stone | United States |
| C. L. Sulzberger | United States |
| Terkel Terkelsen | Denmark |
| Margaret Thatcher | United Kingdom |
| J. V. Thygesen | Denmark |
| Otto Grieg Tidemand | Norway |
| Halil Tunç | Turkey |
| Pierre Uri | France |
| Dagfinn Vårvik | Norway |
| Franz Vranitzky | Austria |
| Marcus Wallenberg | Sweden |
| Krister Wickman | Sweden |
| Sigmund Widmer | Switzerland |
| Otto Wolff von Amerongen | Germany |
| Memduh Yaşa | Turkey |
| Selçuk Yaşar | Turkey |
| Jelle Zijlstra | Netherlands |

=== 1977 Conference ===
| Participants | Nationality |
|---|---|
| David L. Aaron | United States |
| Gianni Agnelli | Italy |
| Hannes Androsch | Austria |
| Tina Anselmi | Italy |
| George Ball | United States |
| Frederic Bennett | United Kingdom |
| Jack F. Bennett | United States |
| Georges Berthoin | France |
| Selahattin Beyazıt | Turkey |
| Muharrem Nuri Birgi | Turkey |
| Trygve Bratteli | Norway |
| Guido Carli | Italy |
| Cesi Cittadini | Italy |
| Emilio Collado | United States |
| Richard N. Cooper | United States |
| Jean-Pierre Cot | France |
| Ralf Dahrendorf | West Germany |
| Étienne Davignon | France |
| Klaus von Dohnanyi | West Germany |
| Roberto Ducci | Italy |
| Wim Duisenberg | The Netherlands |
| Rodney Elton | United Kingdom |
| Murray Finley | United States |
| Paul B. Finney | United States |
| Garret FitzGerald | Ireland |
| Charles Forte | United Kingdom |
| Manuel Fraga | Spain |
| Marcella Glisenti | Italy |
| Anthony Griffin | Canada |
| Olivier Guichard | France |
| Wolfgang Hager | West Germany |
| Victor Halberstadt | The Netherlands |
| Arnold Hall | United Kingdom |
| Geir Hallgrimsson | Iceland |
| Henry J. II Heinz | United States |
| R.Henderson | United Kingdom |
| Hans Igler | Austria |
| Daniel Janssen | Belgium |
| Joseph E. Johnson | United States |
| Keith Joseph | United Kingdom |
| Walther Leisler Kiep | West Germany |
| Joseph L. Kirkland | United States |
| Henry Kissinger | United States |
| Arthur Knight | United Kingdom |
| Max Kohnstamm | International |
| Marc Lalonde | Canada |
| Léon Lambert | Belgium |
| Emiel van Lennep | Netherlands |
| Harold Lever | United Kingdom |
| Willy Linder | Switzerland |
| Pierre Liotard-Vogt | Switzerland |
| Björn Lundvall | Sweden |
| Joseph Luns | Netherlands |
| Peter Macadam | United Kingdom |
| Robert M. MacIntosh | Canada |
| Bruce MacLaury | United States |
| Alonzo L. McDonald | United States |
| Jose de Medeiros Ferreira | Portugal |
| J. Irwin Miller | United States |
| Thierry de Montbrial | France |
| Sivert Nielsen | Norway |
| Niels Norlund | Denmark |
| John Nott | United Kingdom |
| Arend Oetker | West Germany |
| David Orr | United Kingdom |
| François-Xavier Ortoli | France |
| Raymond Pennoc | United Kingdom |
| G. A. Regan | Canada |
| Frank Roberts | United Kingdom |
| David Rockefeller | United States |
| Eric Roll | United Kingdom |
| Reino Rossi | Finland |
| Edmond Adolphe de Rothschild | France |
| Pierre Salmon | France |
| Carlo Sartori | Italy |
| Helmut Schmidt | West Germany |
| Edward Shackleton | United Kingdom |
| Feyo O. J. Sickinghe | The Netherlands |
| Henri Simonet | Belgium |
| Jean-Charles Snoy et d'Oppuers | Belgium |
| Theo Sommer | West Germany |
| Svend Sorensen | Denmark |
| Constantin Stavropoulos | Greece |
| David Steel | United Kingdom |
| Arthur Taylor von Mehren | United States |
| Terkel Terkelsen | Denmark |
| Lester Thurow | United States |
| Otto Grieg Tidemand | Norway |
| Heinrich Treichl | Austria |
| Victor Umbricht | Switzerland |
| Marcus Wallenberg Jr. | Sweden |
| Siegmund George Warburg | United Kingdom |
| Krister Wickman | Sweden |
| Graham Wickman | United Kingdom |
| Otto Wolff von Amerongen | West Germany |
| Charles Getchell Jr. | United States |
| Robert Pitti-Ferrandi | France |

=== 1978 Conference ===
| Participants | Nationality |
|---|---|
| Gianni Agnelli | Italy |
| K. B. Andersen | Denmark |
| Beniamino Andreatta | Italy |
| Joachim Angermeyer | West Germany |
| George Ball | United States |
| Robert Bartley | United States |
| Andre Batenburg | The Netherlands |
| George B. Bell | Canada |
| Frederic Bennett | United Kingdom |
| Jack Bennett | United States |
| Christoph Bertram | United Kingdom |
| Selahattin Beyazıt | Turkey |
| Tor Brekke | Norway |
| Zbigniew Brzezinski | United States |
| Andreas von Bülow | West Germany |
| Peter Carington | United Kingdom |
| Frank T. Cary | United States |
| Cittadini Cesi | Italy |
| Robert-Charles Close | Belgium |
| Emilio Collado | United States |
| Barber Conable | United States |
| Vítor Constâncio | Portugal |
| George Contogeorgis | Greece |
| Ralph Davidson | United States |
| Étienne Davignon | Belgium |
| Edmund Dell | United Kingdom |
| William Diebold | United States |
| Roberto Ducci | Italy |
| Wim Duisenberg | The Netherlands |
| Wim van Eekelen | The Netherlands |
| Bernard Esambert | France |
| Thorbjörn Fälldin | Sweden |
| Murray Finley | United States |
| Kurt Furgler | Switzerland |
| Curt Gasteyger | Switzerland |
| Reay Geddes | United Kingdom |
| George Brown | United Kingdom |
| Meg Greenfield | United States |
| Anthony Griffin | Canada |
| Patrick Haggerty | United States |
| Alexander Haig | United States |
| Victor Halberstadt | The Netherlands |
| Geir Hallgrímsson | Iceland |
| Rolf Hansen | Norway |
| John Harvey-Jones | United Kingdom |
| Gabriel Hauge | United States |
| Henry J. Heinz II | United States |
| John H. Heinz III | United States |
| Alfred Herrhausen | West Germany |
| Jef Houthuys | Belgium |
| Hans Igler | Austria |
| Joseph E. Johnson | United States |
| Phillip A. Karber | United States |
| Otto Kersten | West Germany |
| Henry Kissinger | United States |
| Andrew Knight | United Kingdom |
| Léon Lambert | Belgium |
| Emiel van Lennep | Netherlands |
| Robert Winston | United States |
| Björn Lundvall | Sweden |
| Joseph Luns | Netherlands |
| Thierry de Montbrial | France |
| John Newhouse | United States |
| Niels Norlund | Denmark |
| Adolf Nussbaumer | Austria |
| Sylvia Ostry | Canada |
| Piero Ottone | Italy |
| Peter G. Peterson | United States |
| Robert Pitti-Ferrandi | France |
| David Rockefeller | United States |
| Eric Roll | United Kingdom |
| Francois de Rose | France |
| Juan Jose Rovira | Spain |
| Paolo Savona | Italy |
| Stefano Silvestri | Italy |
| Jean-Charles Snoy et d'Oppuers | Belgium |
| Anthony M. Solomon | United States |
| Theo Sommer | West Germany |
| Helmut Sonnenfeldt | United States |
| Svend Sorensen | Denmark |
| George Stinson | United States |
| Michel Tatu | United States |
| Gaston Thorn | Luxembourg |
| Otto Grieg Tidemand | Norway |
| Mika Tiivola | Finland |
| Heinrich Treichl | Austria |
| Victor Umbricht | Switzerland |
| Marcus Wallenberg Jr. | Sweden |
| Richard von Weizsäcker | West Germany |
| Clifton R. Wharton Jr. | United States |
| Marina von Neumann Whitman | United States |
| George Will | United States |
| Lynne Williams | United States |
| Hans-Jürgen Wischnewski | West Germany |
| Otto Wolff von Amerongen | West Germany |
| Andreas F. Zaimis | Greece |
| John Zysman | United States |
| Herbert Cordt | Austria |
| Charles Getchell | United States |
| Thomas Heine-Geldern | Austria |
| Charles W. Muller | United States |
| Grant Winthrop | United States |

=== 1979 Conference ===
| Participants | Nationality |
|---|---|
| Gianni Agnelli | Italy |
| Hannes Androsch | Austria |
| Herlbert Apfalter | Austria |
| Nicholas Eden | United Kingdom |
| George Ball | United States |
| Vittorio Barattier | Italy |
| Frederic Bennett | United Kingdom |
| Christoph Bertram | West Germany |
| Christian Beullac | France |
| Selahattin Beyazıt | Turkey |
| Birgit Breuel | West Germany |
| Tassilo Broesigke | Austria |
| Lewis Dean Brown | United States |
| Kostas Karras | Greece |
| John Chafee | United States |
| Henning Christophersen | Denmark |
| Cittadini Cesi | Italy |
| Vítor Constâncio | Portugal |
| Alfred Dallinger | Austria |
| Wim Duisenberg | Netherlands |
| Theodore L. Eliot Jr. | United States |
| Bernard Esambert | France |
| Paul Finnegan | United States |
| Heinz Fischer | Austria |
| William Foltz | United States |
| Wayne J. Fredericks | United States |
| Fritz Gerber | Switzerland |
| Knut Getz Wold | Norway |
| Victor Halberstadt | Netherlands |
| Arthur A. Hartman | United States |
| Helmut Haussmann | West Germany |
| Henry J. Heinz II | United States |
| Alfred Herrhausen | West Germany |
| Hans Igler | Austria |
| Daniel E. Janssen | Belgium |
| Vernon Jordan | United States |
| Christian Kind | Switzerland |
| Max Kohnstamm | Netherlands |
| Bruno Kreisky | Austria |
| Léon Lambert | Belgium |
| Erwin Lanc | Austria |
| Franz J. Leibenfrost | Austria |
| Emiel van Lennep | Netherlands |
| Walter J. Levy | United States |
| Bernard Lewis | United Kingdom |
| Flora Lewis | United States |
| Björn Lundvall | Sweden |
| Joseph Luns | Netherlands |
| Donald Stovel Macdonald | Canada |
| Maurice Macmillan | United Kingdom |
| David E. McGiffert | United States |
| Jérôme Monod | France |
| Thierry de Montbrial | France |
| Roelof Nelissen | Netherlands |
| Edward Neufeld | Canada |
| David D. Newsom | United States |
| Niels Norlund | Denmark |
| Willibald Pahr | Austria |
| Robert Pitti-Ferrandi | France |
| Hugo Portisch | Austria |
| Thomas Prinzhorn | Austria |
| Jacques Rastoul | Canada |
| David Rockefeller | United States |
| Detlev Karsten Rohwedder | West Germany |
| Eric Roll | United Kingdom |
| Joaquin Romero-Maura | Spain |
| Robert Roosa | United States |
| Roger Savory | Canada |
| Ernest A. Seillière | France |
| Edward Shackleton | United Kingdom |
| Jack Sheinkman | United States |
| Stefano Silvestri | Italy |
| Henri Simonet | Belgium |
| Theo Sommer | West Germany |
| David Steel | United Kingdom |
| Reiulf Steen | Norway |
| Ludwig Steiner | Austria |
| Josef Taus | Austria |
| Arthur R. Taylor | United States |
| Gaston Thorn | Luxembourg |
| Otto Grieg Tidemand | Norway |
| Heinrich Treichl | Austria |
| Nicola Tufarelli | Italy |
| Ola Ullsten | Sweden |
| Victor Umbricht | Switzerland |
| Franz Vranitzky | Austria |
| Marcus Wallenberg Jr. | Sweden |
| Franklin H. Williams | United States |
| Joseph H. Williams | United States |
| Lars Wohlin | Sweden |
| Otto Wolff von Amerongen | West Germany |
| Jacques van Ypersele de Strihou | Belgium |
| Herbert Cordt | Austria |
| Charles Getchell | United States |
| Thomas Heine-Geldern | Austria |

=== 1980 Conference ===
| Participants | Nationality |
|---|---|
| Oswald Aeppli | Switzerland |
| K. B. Andersen | Denmark |
| George Ball | United States |
| John Baring | United Kingdom |
| Reginald Bartholomew | United States |
| Luigi Barzini | Italy |
| Frederic Bennett | United Kingdom |
| Jack Bennett | United States |
| Giorgio Benvenuto | Italy |
| Christoph Bertram | Federal Republic of Germany |
| Selahattin Beyazıt | Turkey |
| Muharrem Nuri Birgi | Turkey |
| Birgit Breuel | Federal Republic of Germany |
| Guido Brunner | Federal Republic of Germany |
| McGeorge Bundy | United States |
| Ignacio Camuñas | Spain |
| Kostas Karras | Greece |
| Olivier Chevrillon | France |
| Cittadini Cesi | Italy |
| Emilio Collado | United States |
| Peter Corterier | Federal Republic of Germany |
| Étienne Davignon | Belgium |
| Thomas R. Donahue. | United States |
| Hedley Donovan | United States |
| Wim Duisenberg | Netherlands |
| William B. Duncan | United Kingdom |
| Theodore L. Eliot Jr. | United States |
| Bernard Esambert | France |
| Luigi Ferro | Italy |
| Murray Finley | United States |
| Paul Finney | United States |
| Jean-Claude Gisling | Switzerland |
| Ronald Grierson | United Kingdom |
| Anthony Griffin | Canada |
| Alfred Grosser | France |
| Herbert Grunewald | Federal Republic of Germany |
| Victor Halberstadt | Netherlands |
| Geir Hallgrímsson | Iceland |
| Helmut Haussmann | Federal Republic of Germany |
| Denis Healey | United Kingdom |
| Henry John Heinz II | United States |
| Alfred Herrhausen | Federal Republic of Germany |
| H.F. van den Hoven | Netherlands |
| Gunter Huonker | Federal Republic of Germany |
| Douglas Hurd | United Kingdom |
| Hans Igler | Austria |
| Daniel Janssen | Belgium |
| Joseph E. Johnson | United States |
| Vernon Jordan | United States |
| Karlheinz Kaske | Federal Republic of Germany |
| Helmut Kohl | Federal Republic of Germany |
| Walther Leisler Kiep | Federal Republic of Germany |
| Henry Kissinger | United States |
| Max Kohnstamm | Netherlands |
| Andrew Knight | United Kingdom |
| Joseph Kraft | United States |
| Léon Lambertn | Belgium |
| Otto Lambsdorff | Federal Republic of Germany |
| Albert Legault | Canada |
| Emiel van Lennep | Netherlands |
| Walter Levy | United States |
| Robert Winston | United States |
| Björn Lundvall | Sweden |
| Joseph Luns | Netherlands |
| Franz Lutolf | Switzerland |
| Donald Stovel Macdonald | Canada |
| H. Ian Macdonald | Canada |
| Bruce MacLaury | United States |
| Judith Maxwell | United Kingdom |
| José Medeiros Ferreira | Portugal |
| Thierry de Montbrial | France |
| Niels Norlund | Denmark |
| Jean-Paul Parayre | France |
| James Alfred Perkins | United States |
| Robert Pitti-Ferrandi | France |
| Gerhard Prinz | Federal Republic of Germany |
| Romano Prodi | Italy |
| David Rockefeller | United States |
| Eric Roll | United Kingdom |
| Gerhard Schmidt | Federal Republic of Germany |
| Helmut Schmidt | Federal Republic of Germany |
| Karel Schwarzenberg | Austria |
| Antoine Seilliere | France |
| Stefano Silvestri | Italy |
| Henri Simonet | Belgium |
| Jean-Charles Snoy et d'Oppuers | Belgium |
| Theo Sommer | Federal Republic of Germany |
| Helmut Sonnenfeldt | United States |
| Dieter Spethmann | Federal Republic of Germany |
| Barbara Spinelli | Italy |
| Max van der Stoel | Netherlands |
| Shepard Stone | United States |
| Terkel Terkelsen | Denmark |
| Franklin Thomas | United States |
| Gaston Thorn | Luxembourg |
| Otto Grieg Tidemand | Norway |
| Leo Tindemans | Belgium |
| Heinrich Treichl | Austria |
| Gregory F. Treverton | United States |
| Harry Tuzo | United Kingdom |
| Victor Umbricht | Switzerland |
| Helen Vlachos | Greece |
| Marcus Wallenberg Jr. | Sweden |
| Klaus Waris | Finland |
| Rüdiger von Wechmar | Federal Republic of Germany |
| Niels Werring | Norway |
| Joseph H. Williams | United States |
| Lars Wohlin | Sweden |
| Otto Wolff von Amerongen | Federal Republic of Germany |
| Hans-Jorg Budishin | Federal Republic of Germany |
| N. Dreihann-Holenia | Austria |
| Anne Hoogendoorn | Netherlands |

=== 1981 Conference ===
| Participants | Nationality |
|---|---|
| Oswald Aeppli | Switzerland |
| Gianni Agnelli | Italy |
| Tage Andersen | Denmark |
| Hannes Androsch | Austria |
| George Ball | United States |
| Francisco Pinto Balsemão | Portugal |
| Jack F. Bennett | United States |
| Christoph Bertram | Federal Republic of Germany |
| Ernst van der Beugel | Netherlands |
| Selahattin Beyazıt | Turkey |
| Erling Bjol | Denmark |
| Conrad Black | Canada |
| Laurens Jan Brinkhorst | Netherlands |
| William Bundy | United States |
| Ignacio Camuñas | Spain |
| Kostas Karras | Greece |
| Theodore L. Eliot Jr. | United States |
| Murray H. Finley | United States |
| Gordon N. Fisher | Canada |
| Colette Flesch | Luxembourg |
| Robert Ford | Canada |
| Knut Frydenlund | Norway |
| Arthur Furer | Switzerland |
| Kurt Furgler | Switzerland |
| Fritz Gerber | Switzerland |
| Sten Gustafsson | Sweden |
| Geir Hallgrímsson | Iceland |
| Denis Healey | United Kingdom |
| Henry John Heinz II | United States |
| Alfred Herrhausen | Federal Republic of Germany |
| Tankmar Horn | Finland |
| Josef Houthuys | Belgium |
| Douglas Hurd | United Kingdom |
| Per Hysing-Dahl | Norway |
| Hans Igler | Austria |
| Kâmran İnan | Turkey |
| Emmanuel Iselin | Switzerland |
| Daniel Janssen | Belgium |
| Vernon Jordan | United States |
| Claude Julien | France |
| Karlheinz Kaske | Federal Republic of Germany |
| Jeane Kirkpatrick | United States |
| Henry Kissinger | United States |
| Andrew Knight | United Kingdom |
| Max Kohnstamm | Netherlands |
| Léon Lambert | Belgium |
| Panagiotis Lambrias | Geece |
| Emiel van Lennep | Netherlands |
| Wolfgang Leonhard | Federal Republic of Germany |
| Jacques Levesque | Canada |
| Flora Lewis | United States |
| Klaus Liesen | Federal Republic of Germany |
| Pierre Liotard-Vogt | Switzerland |
| Joseph Luns | Netherlands |
| Franz Lutolf | Switzerland |
| Donald Stovel Macdonald | Canada |
| Bruce MacLaury | United States |
| David J. Mahoney | United States |
| Charles Mathias. | United States |
| Charles Peter McColough | United States |
| Alois Mertes | Federal Republic of Germany |
| John L. Mills | United Kingdom |
| Walter Mondale | United States |
| Thierry de Montbrial | France |
| Tor Moursund | Norway |
| Paul H. Müller | Switzerland |
| Prince Claus of the Netherlands | Netherlands |
| P. F. Niquille | Switzerland |
| Niels Norlund | Denmark |
| Heinrich Oswald | Switzerland |
| Richard Pipes | United States |
| Romano Prodi | Italy |
| David Rockefeller | United States |
| Bernard W. Rogers | United States |
| Eric Roll | United Kingdom |
| Hans Seidel | Austria |
| Antoine Seilliere | France |
| Stefano Silvestri | Italy |
| Nicholas Soames | United Kingdom |
| Theo Sommer | Federal Republic of Germany |
| Herbert Stein | United States |
| Arthur R. Taylor | United States |
| Gaston Thorn | Luxemboug |
| Malcolm Toon | United States |
| Victor Umbricht | Switzerland |
| Hans Vatne | Norway |
| Jean-Francois Verdonnet | Switzerland |
| Marcus Wallenberg Jr. | Sweden |
| Rüdiger von Wechmar | International |
| Niels Werring | Norway |
| George Will | United States |
| Lars Wohlin | Sweden |
| Daniel Yankelovich | United States |
| Andreas Z'Graggen | Switzerland |
| Jose Luis Gomes | Portugal |
| Hanno Hartmann | Federal Republic of Germany |
| Anne Hoogendoorn | Netherlands |
| Malcolm J. McKechnie | Canada |
| Charles Muller | United States |
| Etienne Reuter | Luxembourg |
| Raymond Roe | United States |
| F. Stoecker | Federal Republic of Germany |

=== 1982 Conference ===
| Participants | Nationality | Title |
|---|---|---|
| Tage Andersen | Denmark | Managing Director and Chief Executive, Den Danske Bank |
| Dwayne O. Andreas | United States | Chairman and Chief Executive Officer, Archer Daniels Midland |
| Hannes Androsch | Austria | Chairman of the Managing Board of Directors, Creditanstalt Bankverein |
| Egon Bahr | Federal Republic of Germany | Member of Parliament; |
| George W. Ball | United States | Senior managing director, Lehman Brothers Kuhn Loeb |
| Maria Becket | Greece | Former Advisor to Ministers of Coordination and Foreign Affairs |
| Jack F. Bennett | United States | Director and Senior Vice-president, Exxon Corporation |
| Georges Berthoin | France | European Chairman, The Trilateral Commission |
| Christoph Bertram | Federa Republic of Germany | Director, The German Institute for International and Security Affairs |
| Ernst van der Beugel | Netherlands | Professor of International Relations, Leiden University; Director of Companies |
| Selahattin Beyazıt | Turkey | Director of Companies |
| Björn Bjarnason | Iceland | Political Journalist, Morgunblaðið |
| Gro Harlem Brundtland | Norway | Member of Parliament, Former Prime Minister of Norway |
| Erhard Busek | Austria | Deputy Mayor of Vienna; Former Secretary General Austrian People's Party |
| Kostas Karras | Greece | Member of the Board, Union of Greek Shipowners |
| Jaime Carvajal Urquijo | Spain | Chairman and Chief Executive Officer, Banco Urquijo |
| Fredrik Castren | Finland | President and Chief Executive Officer, Kymi Kymmene Oy |
| Jean Chrétien | Canada | Minister of Justice and Attorney of Canada |
| Henning Christophersen | Denmark | Member of Parliament, Chairman of the Foreign Affairs of Denmark |
| Hisse Dekker | Netherlands | President, Philips Gloeilampenfab |
| Paul Desmarais | Canada | Chairman and Chief Executive Officer, Power Corporation of Canada |
| William Dimma | Canada | President, A.E. LePage Ltd. and Board Chairman, Polymer Corporation |
| Hermann Eilts | United States | University Professor of International Relations, Research Professor of History and Political Science, Boston University |
| Murray Finley | United States | President, Amalgamated Clothing Workers of America |
| Paul B. Finney | United States | Editorial Director, Thomson Magazines |
| Jean François-Poncet | France | Former Minister of Foreign of France |
| Knut Frydenlund | Norway | Member of Parliament; Former Minister of Foreign of Norway |
| Evan G. Galbraith | United States | U.S. Ambassador to France |
| Charles Getchell | United States | Lawyer and Trustee |
| Meg Greenfield | United States | Editorial Page Editor, The Washington Post |
| Sten Gustafsson | Sweden | Managing Director, Saab-Scania |
| Geir Hallgrímsson | Iceland | Member of Parliament, Former Prime Minister of Iceland |
| Fritz Halmce | Switzerland | Chairman of the Board of Directors, SIG Swiss Industrial Company; Chairman, Swiss Employers Union |
| Robert A. Hanson | United States | President and Chief Operating Officer, John Deere |
| Henry J. Heinz II | United States | Chairman of the Board, H.J. Heinz Company; President, American Friends of Bilderberg |
| Alfred Herrhausen | Federal Republic of Germany | Managing Director, Deutsche Bank AG |
| Erik Hoffmeyer | Denmark | Chairman of the Board of Governors, Danmarks Nationalbank |
| Karen E. House | United States | Washington Correspondent, The Wall Street Journal |
| Robin Ibbs | United Kingdom | Executive Director, Imperial Chemical Industries; Former Head, Central Policy Review Staff, Cabinet Office |
| Hans Igler | Austria | Partner, Schoeller & Co. Bankaktiengesellschaft |
| Hal Jackman | Canada | Chairman of the Board, Empire Life Insurance Company of America Building |
| Vernon Jordan | United States | Partner, Akin, Gump, Strauss, Hauer & Feld (Attorneys-at-Law); Former President, National Urban League |
| Elie Kedourie | United Kingdom | Professor of Politics, University of London |
| Henry Kissinger | United States | Former Secretary of State; Professor, Center for Strategic and International Studies, Georgetown University |
| Andrew Knight | United Kingdom | Editor, The Economist |
| Helmut Kohl | Federal Republic of Germany | Chairman, CDU/CSU Parliamentary Group |
| Max Kohnstamm | Netherlands | Former President, European University Institute at Florence |
| Philippe Lagayette | France | Directeur de Cabinet, Ministry of Economic Affairs and Finance; Author Working Paper Session IV |
| Baron Lambert | Belgium | Chairman, Groupe Bruxelles Lambert S.A. |
| Otto Graf Lambsdorff | Federal Republic of Germany | Minister of Economics |
| Jacques de Larosière | France | Managing Director, France |
| Nigel Lawson | United Kingdom | Member of Parliament, Secretary of State for Energy |
| Emiel van Lennep | Netherlands | Secretary General, OECD |
| George P. Livanos | Greece | Membaer of the Board, Union of Greek Shipowners |
| Winston Lord | United States | President, Council on Foreign Relations |
| Joseph Luns | Netherlands | Secretary General, NATO |
| Franz Lutolf | Switzerland | General Manager and Member of the Executive Board, Swiss Bank Corporation |
| Donald Stovel Macdonald | Canada | Senior Partner, McCarthy & McCarthy |
| Bruce K. MacLaury | United States | President, Brookings Institution |
| David J. Mahoney | United States | Chairman of the Board and Chief Executive Officer, Norton Simon |
| Jacques Maisonrouge | France | Chairman of the Board, IBM and World Trade Corporation |
| Rogerio Martins | Portugal | Chairman, Simapre Investment Company; Former Secretary of State of Industry |
| Hans van Mierlo | Netherlands | Minister of Defense |
| Thierry de Montbrial | France | Director, French Institute of International Relations; Professor of Economics, Ecole Polytechnique |
| Tor Moursund | Norway | Managing Director and Chief Executive, Christianla Bank og Kreditkasse |
| Einar Nagell-Erichsen | Norway | Managing Director, Aftenposten/Schibstedgruppen |
| Prince Claus of the Netherlands | Netherlands | |
| James R. Nininger | Canada | President, Conference Board of Canada |
| Niels Norlund | Denmark | Editor-in-chief, Berlingske Tidende |
| Piero Ostellino | Italy | Columnist, Corriere dell Sera |
| Sylvia Ostry | Canada | Head, Department of Economics and Statistics, OECD; Author Working Paper Session IV |
| David Owen | United Kingdom | Joint Leader of the Social Democratic Party, Member of Parliament, Former Foreign Secretary |
| Haluk Özgül | Turkey | Ambassador of Turkey in Norway |
| Robert L. Pfaltzgraff, Jr. | United States | Professor, Fletcher School of Law and Diplomacy; Author Working Paper Session II |
| Richard Pipes | United States | Senior Staff Member, National Security Council (Baird Professor of History, Harvard University, on-leave) |
| Karl Otto Pohl | Federal Republic of Germany | President, Deutsche Bundesbank |
| Romano Prodi | Italy | Professor of Industrial Economics, University of Bologna |
| James Roche | United States | Senior Deputy Director, Policy Planning Staff, Department of State |
| David Rockefeller | United States | Chairman, Chase Manhattan Bank International Advisory Committee |
| Bernard W. Rogers | United States | Supreme Allied Commander Europe |
| Virginio Rognoni | Italy | Minister of Internal Affairs |
| Lord Roll of Ipsden | United Kingdom | Chairman, S. G. Warburg & Co. Ltd. |
| Robert V. Roosa | United States | Senior Partner, Brown Brothers Harriman & Company |
| Sir John Sainsbury | United Kingdom | Chairman, J. Sainsbury PLC |
| E. Antoine Seilliere | France | Director General, Compagnie Internationale pour le Commerce et l'Industrie |
| Stefano Silvestri | Italy | Deputy Director, Deputy Director, Institute of International Affairs |
| William E. Simon | United States | Chairman, Crescent Diversified Ltd.; Former Secretary of the Treasury; Author Working Paper Session IV |
| Henri F. Simonet | Belgium | Member of Parliament; Author Working Paper Session I |
| Anders C. Sjaastad | Norway | Minister of Defense |
| Hermod Skånland | Norway | Deputy Governor of the Bank of Norway |
| Lord Soames | United Kingdom | |
| Theo Sommer | Federal Republic of Germany | Publisher, Die Zeit |
| Andre S. Spoor | Netherlands | Editor-in-Chief, NRC Handelsblad |
| Thorvald Stoltenberg | Norway | Member of the International Secretariat of the Federation of Trade Unions |
| Robert S. Strauss | United States | Partner, Akin, Gump, Strauss, Hauer & Feld (Attorneys-at-Law); Former U.S. Special Trade Representative for Trade Negotiations |
| Svenn Stray | Norway | Minister of Foreign Affairs |
| Bjorn Svedberg | Sweden | President, Telefonaktiebolaget LM Ericsson |
| Otto Grieg Tidemand | Norway | Shipowner; Former Minister of Defense |
| Metin Toker | Turkey | Columnist, Milliyet |
| Victor H. Umbricht | Switzerland | Mediator, East African Community; Member of the Board of Ciba-Geigy Ltd. |
| Alexandre de Azeredo Vaz Pinto | Portugal | President, The Institute of Foreign Investment; Former Minister of Commerce |
| Paul A. Volcker | United States | Chairman, Board of Governors, Federal Reserve System |
| Ben J. Wattenberg | United States | Senior Fellow, American Enterprise Institute; Author Working Paper Session I |
| Niels Werring, Jr. | Norway | Senior Partner, Wilh. Wilhelmsen |
| Joseph H. Williams | United States | Chairman of the Board and Chief Executive Officer, The Williams Companies |
| Kåre Willoch | Norway | Prime Minister of Norway |
| Lars Wohlin | Sweden | Governor, Swedish Bank |
| Otto Wolff von Amerongen | Federal Republic of Germany | Chairman of the Board of Management, Otto Wolff A.G. |
| Manfred Wörner | Federal Republic of Germany | Member of Parliament, CDU/CSU; Author Working Paper Session I |
| Carlos Aritario | Italy | Personal Advsor to Minister Rognoni |
| Jacques Demers | Canada | Special Advisor, Officer of the Minister of Justice and Attorney General of Canada |
| Hanno Hartmann | Federal Republic of Germany | Assistant to President Walter Scheel |
| Anne Hoogendoorn | Netherlands | Executive Secretary, Bilderberg Meetings |
| R.K. Lochner | Federal Republic of Germany | Accompanying Mr. Helmut Kohl as Interermany |
| Charles Muller | United States | Assistant Secretary, American Friends of Bilderberg; President, Murden & Co. |
| Guido Peruzzo | Federal Republic of Germany | Assistant to the Minister of Economics |
| Gianni Ravasio | Italy | Assistant to Mr. Gaston |
| Rudiger von Rosen | Federal Republic of Germany | Head, President's Office, Deutsche Bundesbank |
| Folkmar Stoecker | Federal Republic of Germany | Assistant to Mr. Walter Scheel |
| Horst Teltschik | Federal Republic of Germany | Head, Office of Mr. Helmut Kohl |

=== 1983 Conference ===
| Participants | Nationality | Title |
|---|---|---|
| Umberto Agnelli | Italy | Chairman, FIAT Auto S.p.A.; Vice-Chairman and Managing Director, Istituto Finanziaro Industriale (IFI) |
| Tage Andersen | Denmark | Managing Director and Chif Executive, Den Danske Bank |
| Dwayne O. Andreas | United States | Chairman & Chief Executive Officer, Archer-Daniels-Midland Company |
| Hannes Androsch | Austria | Chairman of the Management Board, Creditanstalt-Bankverein |
| Hans H. Angermueller | United States | Vice Chairman, Citibank, N.A. |
| George Ball | United States | Former Undersecretary of State |
| Francisco Pinto Balsemão | Portugal | Prime Minister |
| Raymond Barre | France | Former Prime Minister; Member of the National Assembly |
| Piero Bassetti | Italy | President, Bassetti S.p.A.; Chairman of Chamber of Commerce |
| Jack F. Bennett | United States | Senior Vice President & Director, EXXON Corporation |
| Georges Berthoin | France | European Chairman, The Trilateral Commission |
| Ernst van der Beugel | Netherlands | Professor of International Relations, Leyden University; Director of Companies |
| Selahattin Beyazıt | Turkey | Director of Companies |
| Seweryn Bialer | United States | Director, Research Institute on International Change, Columbia University |
| Muharrem Nuri Birgi | Turkey | Former Ambassador to NATO |
| Lise Bissonette | Canada | Editor-in-Chief, Le Devoir |
| Bjorn Bjarnason | Iceland | Political Journalist, Morgunbladid |
| Halvdan Bjorum | Norway | Chairman of the Board, A/S Elektrisk Bureau |
| Conrad Black | Canada | Chairman, Argus Corporation, Ltd. |
| Gro Harlem Brundtland | Norway | Parliamentary Leader, Labour Party |
| William Bundy | United States | Editor-in-Chief, Foreign Affairs |
| Kostas Karras | Greece | Member of the Board, Union of Greek Shipowners |
| Peter Carrington | United Kingdom | Former Foreign Minister; Leader Conservative Party, House of Lords |
| Jaime Carvajal y Urquijo | Spain | Chairman of the Board of Directors, Banco Urquijo |
| Fredrik Castren | Finland | President and Chief Executive Officer, Kymi Kymmene Oy; Chairman of the Confederation of Finnish Industries |
| Juan Luis Cebrián | Spain | Editor-in-Chif, El Pais |
| Henning Christophersen | Denmark | Deputy Prime Minister and Minister of Finance |
| Alden W. Clausen | United States | President, The World Bank |
| Kenneth W. Dam | United States | Deputy Secretary of State |
| Étienne Davignon | Belgium | Vice-president, Commission of the European Communities |
| James Dobbins | United States | Deputy Assistant Secretary of State |
| Thomas R. Donahue | United States | Secretary-Treasurer, AFL-CIO |
| Elizabeth Drew | United States | Journalist |
| Kjell-Olof Feldt | Sweden | Minister of Finance |
| Anders Ferm | Sweden | Ambassador, Permanent Mission of Sweden to the United Nations |
| Murray H. Finley | United States | President, Amalgamated Clothing & Textile Workers Union |
| Charles Getchell | United States | Partner, Gray & Wendell (Attorneys-at-Law) |
| Bernardino Gomes | Portugal | Vice Chairman, Foundation for International Relations |
| Alain Gomez | France | Chairman and Chief Executive Officer, Thomson Group |
| Anthony Griffin | Canada | Director of Companies |
| Henry A. Grunwald | United States | Editor-in-Chief, Time, Inc. |
| Sten Gustafsson | Sweden | Managing Director, SAAB-SCANIA AB |
| Arthur A. Hartman | United States | U.S. Ambassador to the Soviet Union |
| Hans Heckmann | Switzerland | General Manager, Union Bank of Switzerland |
| Jack Heinz | United States | Chairman, H.J. Heinz Company; President, American Friends of Bilderberg, Inc. |
| Alfred Herrhausen | West Germany | Managing Director, Deutsche Bank A.G. |
| Stanley Hoffmann | United States | Chairman, Center for European Studies, Harvard University |
| Robert Hormats | United States | Vice President, Goldman Sachs & Company |
| Jozef Houthuys | Belgium | President, Confederation of the Christian Unions |
| Peter Jankowitsch | Austria | Deputy Secretary General for Foreign Affairs |
| Daniel E. Janssen | Belgium | Chairman, Federation of Belgian Enterprises; Chairman Executive Committee, U.C.B., S.A. |
| Vernon Jordan | United States | Partner, Akin, Gump, Srauss, Hauer & Feld; Former President, National Urban League |
| David T. Kearns | United States | Chairman, Xerox Corporation |
| Henry Kissinger | United States | Former Secretary of State |
| Andrew Knight | United Kingdom | Editor, The Economist |
| Léon Lambert | Belgium | Chairman, Groupe Bruxelles Lambert, S.A. |
| Otto Graf Lambsdorff | West Germany | Minister of Economic Affairs |
| Alexandre Lamfalussy | Belgium | Assistant General Manager, Bank for International Settlements |
| Gilles Lamontagne | Canada | Minister of Defense |
| Emile van Lennep | Netherlands | Secretary-General, OECD |
| André Leysen | Belgium | Chairman of the Board, AGFA-GEVAERT Group |
| Winston Lord | United States | President, Council on Foreign Relations |
| Ruud Lubbers | Netherlands | Prime Minister |
| Joseph Luns | Netherlands | Secretary-General, NATO |
| Franz Lutolf | Switzerland | General Manager and Member of the Executive Board, Swiss Bank Corporation |
| Donald Stovel Macdonald | Canada | Senior Partner, McCarthy & McCarthy |
| Allan MacEachen | Canada | Deputy Prime Minister and Secretary of State for External Affaris |
| Bruce K. MacLaury | United States | President, Brookings Institution |
| David Mahoney | United States | Chairman of the Board, Norton Simon Inc. |
| Jacques Maisonrouge | France | Chairman of the Board, IBM and World Trade Corporation |
| Rogerio Martins | Portugal | Chairman, Simopre; Former Secretary of State for Industry |
| Leighton W. McCarthy | Canada | President, McCarthy Securities Ltd. |
| R. Daniel McMichael | United States | Administrative Agent, Scaife Family Charitable Trusts |
| Alois Mertes | West Germany | Minister of State, Ministry of Foreign Affairs |
| Thierry de Montbrial | France | Director, French Institute of International Relations; Professor of Economics, Ecole Polytechnique |
| Mario Monti | Italy | Professor of Monetary Theory and Policy, Bocconi University, Milan; President, SUERF |
| William D. Mulholland | Canada | Chairman and Chief Executive Officer, Bank of Montreal |
| Niels Norlund | Denmark | Editor-in-Chief, Berlingske Tidende |
| Clas-Erik Odhner | Sweden | Economist at the Swedish Trade Union Confederation |
| Coen J. Oort | Netherlands | Member of the Board, Algemene Bank Nederland N.V. |
| Anthony O'Reilly | Ireland | President and Chief Executive Officer, H.J. Heinz Company |
| John D. Paleocrassas | Greece | Member of Parliament; Former Minister of Coordination; Secretary-General of New Democracy Party |
| Richard Perle | United States | Assistant Secretary of Defense for International Security Policy |
| Alfred Powis | Canada | Chairman and Chief Executive Officer, Noranda Mines Ltd. |
| Raymond Probst | Switzerland | Secretary of State, Federal Department of Foreign Affairs |
| Jacques Rastoul | Canada | Executive Director, Canadian Institute of International Affairs |
| John P. Roche | United States | Professor, Fletcher School of Law and Diplomacy, Tufts University |
| David Rockefeller | United States | Chairman, Chase Manhattan Bank International Advisory Committee |
| Bernard W. Rogers | United States | Supreme Allied Commander Europe |
| Eric Roll | United Kingdom | Chairman, S.G. Warburg & Co. Ltd. |
| Evelyn de Rothschild | United Kingdom | Chairman, N.M. Rothschild & Sons Ltd. |
| Volker Rühe | West Germany | Deputy Leader, Parliamentary Party CDU/CSU; Spokesman on Foreign and Security Policy |
| John Sainsbury | United Kingdom | Chairman, J. Sainsbury PLC |
| Willem E. Scherpenhuijsen | Netherlands | Rom Chairman of the Board of Managing Directors, Nederlandsche Middenstandsbank N.V. |
| Helmut Schmidt | West Germany | Former Chancellor of the Federal Republic of Germany |
| Antoine Seilliere | France | Director-General, Compagnie Internationale pour le Commerce et l'Industrie |
| Anders C. Sjaastad | Norway | Minister of Defense |
| Theo Sommer | West Germany | Publisher, Die Zeit |
| Josef Taus | Austria | Managing Partner, Constantia Industrieverwaltungsges. m.b.H. |
| C.G.E. Theriault | Canada | Vice-Chief of the Defense Staff |
| Pierre Trudeau | Canada | Prime Minister |
| İlter Türkmen | Turkey | Minister of Foreign Affairs |
| Paul Volcker | United States | Chairman, Board of Governors, The Federal Reserve System |
| Niels Werring, Jr. | Norway | Senior Partner, Wilh. Wilhelmsen |
| Hans Werthen | Sweden | Chairman, Ericsson and Electrolux Group |
| Otto Wolff von Amerongen | West Germany | Chairman of the Board of Management, Otto Wolff A.G.; Chairman, German Federation of Chambers of Industry and Commerce |
| Juan A. Yanez-Barnuevo | Spain | Director, Department of International Affairs at the Office of the Prime Minister |
| Paolo Zannoni | Italy | Director, Department Political Analysis, FIAT S.p.A. |
| Tom Axworthy | Canada | Principal Secretary to the Prime Minister |
| Joseph Caron | Canada | Secretariat of Privy Council Office (Foreign and Defense Policy) |
| Hennecke Graf von Bassowitz | West Germany | Assistant to Mr. Scheel |
| Hans-Henning Blomeyer | West Germany | Head, Office of Mr. Mertes |
| Ulf Boge | West Germany | Head, Office of Mr. Scheel |
| Michael Dallas | United States | Head, Office of General Rogers |
| Robert Fowler | Canada | Assistant Secretary to the Cabinet (Foreign and Defense Policy) |
| Jose P. Luiz Gomes | Portugal | Diplomatic Advisor to Prime Minister ad interim Balsemao |
| Kai Hammerich | Sweden | Senior Vice President, SAAB SCANIA AB |
| Thomas Hertz | West Germany | Head, Office of Graf Lambsdorff |
| Anne Hoogendoorn | Netherlands | Executive Secretary, Bilderberg Meetings |
| Baki İlkin | Turkey | Personal Assistant to Mr. Türkmen |
| Ted Johnson | Canada | Executive Assistant to the Prime Minister |
| Kenzie MacKinnon | Canada | Executive Assistant to the Secretary of State for External Affairs |
| Jim Mitchell | Canada | Department of External Affairs (Policy Analysis) |
| Charles W. Muller | United States | President, Murden & Co. |
| Michael Phillips | Canada | Senior Departmental Assistant to the Secretary of State for External Affairs |
| Reinhardt Sturmer | West Germany | Assistant to Mr. Schmidt |
| Bernard C. Thillaye | Canada | Director, Strategic Policy Planning, Department of National Defense |
| Grant F. Winthrop | United States | Joint Raporteur, Bilderberg Meetings |
| Georg Zimmer-Lehmann | Austria | Managing Director, Creditanstalt-Bankverein |

=== 1984 Conference ===
| Participants | Nationality | Title |
|---|---|---|
| Henrik Aasarod | Norway | Norwegian Seamens Union |
| Kenneth Adelman | United States | Director, U.S. Arms Control and Disarmament Agency, Department of State |
| Gianni Agnelli | Italy | President, FIAT |
| Yıldırım Aktürk | Turkey | Former Under Secretary of State, State Planning Organization |
| Dwayne Andreas | United States | Chairman of the Board, Archer-Daniels Midland |
| Hannes Androsch | Austria | Chairman of the Managing Board, Creditanstalt-Bankverein; Former Vice-Chancellor and Minister of Finance |
| Hans H. Angermueller | United States | Vice Chairman of the Board, Citicorp |
| George Ball | United States | Former Under Secretary of State |
| Francisco Pinto Balsemão | Portugal | Former Prime Minister; Director Jornal Expresso |
| John Baring | United Kingdom | Chairman, Baring Brothers & Co |
| Queen Beatrix of the Netherlands | Netherlands | |
| Jack F. Bennett | United States | Director and Senior Vice President, Exxon Corporation |
| C. Fred Bergsten | United States | Director, Institute for International Economics; Former Assistant Secretary forInternational Affairs, Department of the Treasury |
| Christoph Bertram | Federa Republic of Germany | Political Editor, Die Zeit; Former Director, International Institute for Strategic Studies, London |
| Ernst van der Beugel | Netherlands | Professor of International Relations, Leyden University; Director of Companies |
| Selahattin Beyazıt | Turkey | Director of Companies |
| Björn Bjarnason | Iceland | Political Editor, Morgunbladid |
| Nicholas F. Brady | United States | Chairman, Dillon, Read & Co.. Former U.S. Senator |
| Albert Breton | Canada | Professor of Economics, Institute for Policy Analysis, University of Toronto |
| William Bundy | United States | Editor, Foreign Affairs |
| Richard R. Burt | United States | Assistant Secretary of State for European Affairs |
| Louis Cabot | United States | Chairman of the Board, The Cabot Corporation |
| Angelos Canellopoulos | Greece | Vice President, Titan Cement; Member of the Board, Union of Greek Industries |
| Kostas Karras | Greece | Member of the Board, Union of Greek Shipowners |
| Peter Carington | United Kingdom | Secretary-General-designate NATO |
| Jaime Carvajal Urquijo | Spain | Chairman, Banco Hispano Industrial |
| Jean-Pierre Chevènement | France | Member of the National Assembly; President of CERES; Former Minister of Industry |
| Prince Claus of the Netherlands | Netherlands | |
| W. Harriet Critchley | Canada | Associate Professor, Faculty of Social Sciences, Department of Political Science,University of Calgary |
| Étienne Davignon | INT | Vice President, Commission of the European Communities |
| Wisse Dekker | Netherlands | President, Philips Gloeilampenfabrieken |
| L.A. Delvoie | Canada | Chairman, Task Force Work Group, Prime Minister's Task Force on East-West Relations and International Security |
| David A. Dodge | Canada | Assistant Deputy Minister, Strategic Planning, Department of Employment and Immigration |
| James Eberle | United Kingdom | Director, The Royal Institute of International Affairs |
| Uffe Ellemann-Jensen | Denmark | Minister of Foreign Affiairs |
| Thomas O. Enders | United States | U.S. Ambassador to Spain |
| Garret Fitzgerald | Ireland | Prime Minister |
| Colette Flesch | Luxembourg | Minister of Foreign Affairs |
| Murray Finley | United States | President, Amalgamated Clothing and Textile Workers Union AFL-CIO |
| Max Geldens | Netherlands | Director, McKinsey & Company |
| Charles Getchell | United States | Partner, Gray & Wendell (Attorneys-at-Law); Rapporteur, Bilderberg Meetings |
| Sten Gustafsson | Sweden | Chairman of the Board, Saab-Scania |
| Geir Hallgrímsson | Iceland | Minister of Foreign Affairs |
| Charles H. Hantho | Canada | President and Chief Executive officer, CIL Inc. |
| Crown Prince Harald of Norway | Norway | |
| Denis Healey | United Kingdom | Member of Parliament |
| Henry J. Heinz II | United States | Chairman of the Board, H.J. Heinz Company, Inc. |
| Alfred Herrhausen | Federa Republic of Germany | Managing Director, Deutsche Bank |
| Michael Heseltine | United Kingdom | Secretary of State for Defence |
| Gerald Hinteregger | Austria | Secretary-General, Ministry of Foreign Affairs |
| John J. Horan | United States | Chairman and Chief Executive Officer, Merck & Co. |
| Jaakko Iloniemi | Finland | Member of the Management Board of the Union Bank of Finland; Former Ambassador of Finland to the U.S. |
| Daniel E. Janssen | Belgium | Chairman of the Executive Committee, UCB |
| Robert A. Jeker | Switzerland | President of the Executive Board, Credit Suisse |
| Lennart Johansson | Sweden | President and Group Executive, SKF; Vice Chairman of the Federation of Swedish Industries |
| Vernon Jordan | United States | Partner, Akin, Gump, Strauss, Hauer & Feld (Attorneys-at-Law); Former President, National Urban League |
| Karlheinz Kaske | Federa Republic of Germany | President and Chief Executive Officer, Siemens A.G. |
| Louka Katseli | Greece | Scientific Director, Centre of Planning and Economic Research |
| David T. Kearns | United States | President and Chief Executive Officer, Xerox Corporation |
| Henry Kissinger | United States | Former Secretary of State; Professor, Center for Strategic and International Studies, Georgetown University |
| Andrew Knight | United Kingdom | Editor, The Economist |
| Max Kohnstamm | INT | Former President, European University Institute, Florence |
| Kåre Kristiansen | Norway | Minister of Petroleum and Energy |
| Léon Lambert | Belgium | Chairman, Groupe Bruxelles Lambert |
| Otto Graf Lambsdorff | Federa Republic of Germany | Minister of Economic Affairs |
| Emile van Lennep | INT | Secretary-General, OECD |
| Flora Lewis | United States | Foreign Affairs Columnist, The New York Times, Paris Bureau |
| André Leysen | Belgium | Chairman, Federation of Belgian Enterprises; Chairman, Agfa-Gevaert Group |
| Assar Lindbeck | Sweden | Professor of International Economics, University of Stockholm |
| Winston Lord | United States | President, Council on Foreign Relations |
| Aarnout Loudon | Netherlands | President Board of Management, AKZO |
| Joseph Luns | INT | Secretary-General, NATO |
| Franz Lutolf | Switzerland | General Manager and Member of the Executive Board, Swiss Bank Corporation |
| Donald Stovel Macdonald | Canada | Senior Partner, McCarthy & McCarthy; Chairman, Royal Commission on the Economic Union and Development Prospects for Canada |
| Bruce K. MacLaury | United States | President, The Brookings Institution |
| David J. Mahoney | United States | David Mahoney Ventures |
| Miguel Angel Martinez | Spain | Member of Parliament and Vice President, Foreign Affairs Committee |
| Charles Mathias | United States | United States Senator |
| Thierry de Montbrial | France | Director, French Institute of International Relations; Professor of Economics, Ecole Polytechnique |
| Mario Monti | Italy | Professor of Monetary Theory and Policy, Bocconi University, Milan; President, SUERF |
| Curt Nicolin | Sweden | Chairman of the Swedish Employers' Confederation |
| Niels Norlund | Denmark | Editor-in-Chief, Berlingske Tidende |
| Christine Ockrent | France | Editor-in-Chief, Antenne II |
| Clas-Erick Odhner | Sweden | Head of the Research Section of the Swedish Trade Union Confederation |
| Robert O'Neill | INT | Director, International Institute for Strategic Studies |
| Olof Palme | Sweden | Prime Minister |
| Andre Goncalves Pereira | Portugal | Professor of International Law, University of Lisbon; Former Minister of Foreign Affairs |
| William B. Quandt | United States | Senior Fellow, The Brookings Institution |
| John M. Raisman | United Kingdom | Chairman and Chief Executive Officer, Shell UK |
| Alice Rivlin | United States | Director Economic Studies Program, The Brookings Institution; Former Director, The Congressional Budget Office |
| David Rockefeller | United States | Chairman, Chase Manhattan Bank International Advisory Committee |
| Bernard W. Rogers | INT | Supreme Allied Commander Europe |
| Lord Roll of Ipsden | United Kingdom | Chairman, S.G. Warburg & Co. |
| John Sainsbury | United Kingdom | Chairman, J. Sainsbury |
| Juan Tomas de Salas | Spain | Editor, Cambio 16 and Diario 16 |
| Wolfgang Schüssel | Austria | Secretary General, Austrian Economic Federation |
| E. Antoine Seilliere | France | Director-General, Compagnie d'Industrie et de Participations |
| Marshall D. Shulman | United States | Director, W. Averell Harriman Institute for Advanced Study of the Soviet Union, Columbia University |
| Joseph J. Sisco | United States | Partner, Sisco Associates; Former Under Secretary of State for Political Affairs |
| Theo Sommer | Federa Republic of Germany | Publisher, Die Zeit |
| Poul J. Svanholm | Denmark | President and Group Chief Executive, United Breweries |
| Stig Synnergren | Sweden | Principal Aide-de-Camp to the King; Former Supreme Commander |
| Şarık Tara | Turkey | Chairman, ENKA Group of Companies |
| Horst Teltschik | Federa Republic of Germany | Head of Department Foreign Affairs and Security Policy, Chancellor's Office |
| Anders Thunborg | Sweden | Minister of Defense |
| Otto Grieg Tidemand | Norway | Shipowner, Former Minister of Defense |
| Emilio Rui Vilar | Portugal | Vice Governor, Bank of Portugal |
| Peter Wallenberg Sr. | Sweden | Vice Chairman, Skandinaviska Enskilda Banken |
| Niels Werring | Norway | Senior Partner, Wilh. Wilhelmsen |
| Hans Werthen | Sweden | Chairman, Electrolux |
| John C. Whitehead | United States | Senior Partner, Goldman, Sachs & Co. |
| Otto Wolff von Amerongen | Federa Republic of Germany | Chairman of the Board of Management, Otto Wolff |
| Kai Hammerich | Sweden | Senior Vice President, Saab-Scania; Supervisor Swedish Conference |
| John Hennings | United Kingdom | Former High Commissioner in Singapore |
| Anne Hoogendoorn | Netherlands | Executive Secretary, Bilderberg Meetings |
| Charles Muller | United States | Assistant Secretary, American Friends of Bilderberg; President, Murden & Co. |

=== 1985 Conference ===
| Participants | Nationality | Title |
|---|---|---|
| Gianni Agnelli | Italy | President, FIAT |
| Dwayne Andreas | United States | Chairman, Archer-Daniels-Midland Company |
| Johan H. Andresen | Norway | Chairman and Chief Executive Officer, Tiedemann Group |
| Hannes Androsch | Austria | Chairman of the Managing Board, Creditanstalt-Bankverein; Former Vice-Chancellor and Minister of Finance |
| Hans H. Angermueller | United States | Vice Chairman, Citibank |
| George Ball | United States | Former Under Secretary of State |
| Francisco Pinto Balsemão | Portugal | Former Prime Minister; Director, Jornal Expresso |
| Thomas J. Bata | Canada | Chairman, Bata |
| Jack F. Bennett | United States | Director and Senior Vice President, Exxon Corporation |
| Eivinn Berg | Norway | Ambassador and Peramanent Representative, Norwegian Delegation to NATO; Former State Secretary |
| Selahattin Beyazıt | Turkey | Director of Companies |
| John Bierwirth | United States | Chairman, Grumman Corporation |
| Muharrem Nuri Birgi | Turkey | Ambassador at Large |
| Björn Bjarnason | Iceland | Assistant Editor-in-Chief, Morgunbladid |
| Conrad Black | Canada | Chairman, Argus Corporation |
| Bill Bradley | United States | U.S. Senator |
| Nicholas F. Brady | United States | Chairman, Dillon, Read & Company, Former U.S. Senator |
| Zbigniew Brzezinski | United States | Herbert Lehman Professor of Government, Columbia University; Former Assistant to President Carter for National Security Affairs |
| William Bundy | United States | Former Editor, Foreign Affairs |
| Louis W. Cabot | United States | Chairman, Cabot Corporation |
| Umberto Cappuzzo | Italy | Chief of Staff, Italian Army |
| Kostas Karras | Greece | Member of the Board, Greek Shipping Cooperation Committee |
| Hélène Carrère d'Encausse | France | Professor, Institut d'Etudes Politiques de Paris; Professor of History and Political Science of the Soviet Union at the Sorbonne |
| Jaime Carvajal Urquijo | Spain | Chairman, Banco Hispano Industrial |
| Kaspar V. Cassani | Switzerland | Senior Vice President, IBM Corporation; Chairman, IBM World Trade EMEA Corporation |
| Juan Luis Cebrián | Spain | Director and Editor-in-Chief, El Pais |
| Alden W. Clausen | United States | President, The World Bank |
| Jose Manuel Torres Couto | Portugal | Secretary-General, General Trade Union UGT |
| Ralf Dahrendorf | West Germany | Professor, Konstanz University School of Social Sciences |
| Kenneth W. Dam | United States | Deputy Secretary of State |
| Étienne Davignon | Belgium | Former Member, Commission of the European Communities |
| Murray Finley | United States | President, Amalgamated Clothing and Textile Workers Union, AFL-CIO |
| Garret FitzGerald | Ireland | Prime Minister of the Irish Republic |
| Jean François-Poncet | France | Former Minister of Foreign Affairs |
| Michel Francois-Poncet | France | Chairman, Paribas North America |
| Charles Getchell | United States | Partner, Gray & Wendell; Rapporteur Bilderberg Meetings |
| Michel Giraud | France | Senator; President, Regional Council of Ile de France |
| Donald P. Gregg | United States | Assistant to the Vice President for National Security Affairs |
| William E. Griffith | United States | Processor, Political Science Department, Massachusetts Institute of Technology |
| Franklyn Griffiths | Canada | Professor, Center for Russian and East European Studies, University of Toronto |
| Sten Gustafsson | Sweden | Chairman of the Board, Saab-Scania |
| Geir Hallgrímsson | Iceland | Minister of Foreign Affairs |
| Hans Heckmann | Switzerland | Executive Vice President, Member of the Executive Board, Union Bank of Switzerland |
| Henry J. Heinz II | United States | Chairman, H.J. Heinz Company |
| Mats Hellström | Sweden | Minister for Foreign Trade |
| Alfred Herrhausen | West Germany | Managing Director, Deutsche Bank |
| John J. Horan | United States | Chairman, Merck & Company |
| Robert Hormats | United States | Director, Goldman Sachs International Corporation; Former Assistant Secretary of State for Economic and Business Affairs |
| Jaakko Iloniemi | Finland | Member of the Management Board, The Union Bank of Finland; Former Ambassador to the U.S. |
| Martin Jacomb | United Kingdom | Vice-chairman, Kleinwort Benson Limited |
| Daniel E. Janssen | Belgium | Member Executive Committee, Solvay & Cie |
| James R. Jones | United States | U.S. Congressman, Oklahoma |
| Vernon Jordan | United States | Partner, Akin, Gump, Strauss, Hauer & Feld; Former President, National Urban League |
| Basil Kafiris | Greece | Governor, Agricultural Bank of Greece |
| Karl Kaiser | West Germany | Director, Research Institute of the German Society for Foreign Affairs |
| Jak Kamhi | Turkey | Chairman of the Board, Profilo Holding |
| Geoffrey C. Kent | United Kingdom | Chairman and Chief Executive, Imperial Group |
| Henry Kissinger | United States | Former Secretary of State; Professor, Center for Strategic and International Studies, Georgetown University |
| Andrew Knight | United Kingdom | Editor, The Economist |
| Emiel van Lennep | Netherlands | Former Secretary-General, OECD |
| Harold Lever, Baron Lever of Manchester | United Kingdom | Former Cabinet Minister and Financial Secretary; Former Member of Parliament |
| Hans-Adam II, Prince of Liechtenstein | Liechtenstein | |
| Hans B. Van Liemt | Netherlands | Chairman of the Managing Board of Directors, DSM |
| Ernani Rodrigues Lopes | Portugal | Minister of Finance |
| Winston Lord | United States | President, Council on Foreign Relations |
| Donald Stovel Macdonald | Canada | Senior Partner, McCarthy & McCarthy; Chairman, Royal Commission on the Economic Union and Development Prospects for Canada |
| Roy MacLaren | Canada | President, CB Media and Publisher, Canadian Business; Former Member of Parliament and Minister of National Revenue |
| Bruce K. MacLaury | United States | President, The Brookings Institution |
| Jacques Maisonrouge | France | Vice Chairman, Liquid Air Corporation |
| Charles Mathias | United States | U.S. Senator |
| Alois Mertes | West Germany | Minister of State, Ministry of Foreign Affairs |
| Thierry de Montbrial | France | Director, French Institute of International Relations; Professor of Economics, Ecole Polytechnique |
| Mario Monti | Italy | Professor of Monetary Theory and Policy and Director of the Institute of Economics, Bocconi University |
| Felicien Morel | Switzerland | Director of Finance, Canton of Fribourg; Former M.P. |
| Niels Norlund | Denmark | Editor-in-Chief, Berlingske Tidende |
| Osman Esim Olcay | Turkey | Ambassador to NATO; Former Foreign Minister |
| Robert O'Neill | Australia | Director, International Institute for Strategic Studies |
| Jean-Claude Paye | France | Secretary-General, OECD |
| Richard Perle | United States | Assistant Secretary for International Security Policy, U.S. Department of Defense |
| Leland S. Prussia | United States | Chairman, Bank of America |
| Rozanne L. Ridgway | United States | U.S. Ambassador to the German Democratic Republic |
| David Rockefeller | United States | Chairman, Chase Manhattan Bank International Advisory Committee |
| Bernard W. Rogers | United States | Supreme Allied Commander Europe |
| Eric Roll, Baron Roll of Ipsden | United Kingdom | Chairman, S. G. Warburg & Co. |
| Guido Rossi | Italy | Lawyer |
| Onno Ruding | Netherlands | Minister of Finance, Chairman of the Interim Committee of the IMF |
| Giovanni Sartori | Italy | Albert Schweitzer Professor in the Humanities, Columbia University |
| Richard M. Scammon | United States | Director, Elections Research Center |
| Mario Schimberni | Italy | President, Montedison |
| Brent Scowcroft | United States | Vice Chairman, Kissinger Associates; Former Member of President's General Advisory Committee on Arms Control |
| E. Antoine Seilliere | France | Director-General, Compagnie Generale d'Industrie et de Participations |
| Patrick Sheehy | United Kingdom | Chairman, BAT Industries |
| Javier Solana | Spain | Minister of Culture |
| Theo Sommer | West Germany | Publisher, Die Zeit |
| Herbert Stein | United States | Senior Fellow, American Enterprise Institute |
| Norman Tebbit | United Kingdom | Secretary of Trade and Industry; Member of Parliament, Member of the Prime Minister's Cabinet |
| Pierre Trudeau | Canada | Former Prime Minister |
| Victor Umbricht | Switzerland | Member of the Advisory Board, Ciba-Geigy; Mediator, East African Community |
| Joop den Uyl | Netherlands | Parliamentary Leader, Labour Party; Former Prime Minister |
| Franz Vranitzky | Austria | Minister of Finance |
| Mark Weinberg | United Kingdom | Chairman, Hambro Life Assurance |
| Niels Werring | Norway | Senior Partner, Wilh. Wilhelmsen |
| John C. Whitehead | United States | Chairman, International Advisory Board, Goldman Sachs & Co. |
| Norbert Wieczorek | West Germany | Member of Parliament |
| James Wolfensohn | United States | President, James D. Wolfensohn, Inc. |
| Otto Wolff von Amerongen | West Germany | Chairman of the Board of Management, Otto Wolff |
| Bernard Wood | Canada | Director, North-South Institute |
| Manfred Wörner | West Germany | Minister of Defense |
| Edwin H. Yeo III | United States | Managing Director, Morgan Stanley & Company; Former Under Secretary of the Treasury |
| David Young | United Kingdom | Minister without Portfolio; Member Prime Minister's Cabinet |
| Paolo Zannoni | Italy | Director, Department of Political Analysis, FIAT |
| John Hennings | United Kingdom | Organizer, 1986 Conference; Former High Commissioner in Singapore |
| Charles W. Muller | United States | President, Murden and Company |
| Georg Zimmer-Lehman | Austria | Managing Director, Creditanstalt-Bankverein |

=== 1986 Conference ===
| Participants | Nationality | Title |
|---|---|---|
| Carl Johan Aaberg | Sweden | Under-Secretary of State |
| Torvild Aakvaag | Norway | Director General, Norsk Hydro |
| Antony Acland | United Kingdom | Permanent Under Secretary of State and Head of the Diplomatic Service; Ambassador-Designate to Washington |
| Gianni Agnelli | Italy | President, Fiat |
| Tage Andersen | Denmark | Managing Director and Chief Executive, Den Danske Bank |
| Hannes Androsch | Austria | Chairman of the Managing Board of Directors, Creditanstalt-Bankverein; Former Minister of Finance; Former Vice Chancellor |
| George Ball | United States | Former Under Secretary of State |
| Martin Bangemann | Federal Republic of Germany | Minister of Economic Affairs |
| John Baring | United Kingdom | Chairman, Baring Brothers & Co |
| Robert Bartley | United States | Editor, The Wall Street Journal |
| Einar Benediktsson | Iceland | Ambassador to the United Kingdom |
| Jack F. Bennett | United States | Director and Senior Vice President, Exxon Corporation |
| Selahattin Beyazıt | Turkey | Director of Companies |
| Conrad Black | Canada | Chairman, Argus Corporation |
| Tom Boardman | United Kingdom | Chairman, National Westminster Bank |
| Nicholas F. Brady | United States | Chairman, Dillon, Reed & Co.; Former U.S. Senator |
| Hans van den Broek | Netherlands | Minister for Foreign Affairs |
| Richard R. Burt | United States | U.S. Ambassador to the Federal Republic of Germany |
| Yavuz Canevi | Turkey | Governor of the Central Bank of the Republic of Turkey |
| Kostas Karras | Greece | Director of Companies |
| Jaime Carvajal Urquijo | Spain | Chairman, Banco Hispano Industrial |
| John Chafee | United States | U.S. Senator |
| Alain Chevalier | France | Chairman, Moet Hennessy |
| Henry S. F. Cooper Jr. | United States | Deputy U.S. Negotiator, Defense and Space Group |
| Kenneth W. Dam | United States | Vice President, IBM Corporation; Former Deputy Secretary of State |
| David Dautresme | France | General Partner, Lazard Freres & Cie |
| Étienne Davignon | Belgium | Director, Societe Generale de Belgique; Former Member of the Commission of the European Communities |
| Robert A. Day, Jr. | United States | Chairman, Trust Company of the West |
| Wim Duisenberg | Netherlands | President, De Nederlandsche Bank |
| John L. Egan | United Kingdom | Chairman and Chief Executive, Jaguar |
| Daniel J. Evans | United States | U.S. Senator |
| Muray H. Finley | United States | President, Amalgamated Clothing and Textile Workers Union |
| Barbara Frum | Canada | Host of The Journal (Television Program of the Canadian Broadcasting Corporation) |
| Allan Gotlieb | Canada | Ambassador to the United States |
| Denis Greenhill | United Kingdom | Former Permanent Under-Secretary of the Foreign and Commonwealth Office; Director of Companies |
| Anthony Griffin | Canada | Director of Companies |
| Sten Gustafsson | Sweden | Chairman of the Board, SAAB-SCANIA |
| Geir Hallgrímsson | Iceland | Governor of the Central Bank; Former Prime Minister; Former Minister for Foreign Affairs |
| Arthur A. Hartman | United States | Ambassador to the Soviet Union |
| Denis Healey | United Kingdom | Member of Parliament; Opposition Spokesman on Foreign Affairs |
| Henry J. Heinz II | United States | Chairman of the Board, H.J. Heinz Company |
| Alec Douglas-Home | United Kingdom | Former Prime Minister; Former Chairman of Bilderberg Meetings |
| Arnold L. Horelick | United States | Director, The Rand/UCLA Center for the Study of Soviet International Behavior |
| Robert Hormats | United States | Director, Geoldman Sachs International Corporation; Former Assistant Secretary of State for Economic and Business Affairs |
| Hans Igler | Austria | Partner, Schoeller & Co. Banaktiengesellschaft |
| Jaakko Iloniemi | Finland | Member of the Management Board, Union Bank of Finland; Former Ambassador to the United States |
| Robert A. Jeker | Switzerland | President of the Executive Board, Credit Suisse |
| Simon Jenkins | United Kingdom | Political Editor, The Economist |
| Paul R. Jolles | Switzerland | Chairman of the Board, Nestle; Former State Secretary for Foreign Economic Affairs |
| David T. Kearns | United States | Chairman, Xerox Corporation |
| Henry Kissinger | United States | Professor, Center for Strategic and International Studies, Georgetown University; Former Secretary of State |
| Hans Klein | Federal Republic of Germany | Member of Parliament for the CDU/CSU; Spokesman on Foreign Affairs |
| Andrew Knight | United Kingdom | Chief Executive, The Daily Telegraph |
| Max Kohnstamm | Netherlands | Former President, European University Institute |
| Léon Lambert | Belgium | Chairman, Groupe Bruxelles Lambert |
| Alexandre Lamfalussy | Belgium | General Manager, Bank for International Settlements |
| Hans-Adam II, Prince of Liechtenstein | Liechtenstein | |
| Franz J. Lutolf | Switzerland | General Manager and Member of the Executive Board, Swiss Bank Corporation |
| Antonio Maccanico | Italy | General Secretary, Office of the President of the Italian Republic |
| Donald Stovel Macdonald | Canada | Senior Partner, McCarthy & McCarthy |
| Stephanos Manos | Greece | Member of Parliament |
| Charles Mathias | United States | U.S. Senator |
| Leonardo Mathias | Portugal | Ambassador to the United States |
| Donald McHenry | United States | University Research Professor of Diplomacy and International Affairs Georgetown University; Former Ambassador to the United Nations |
| Thierry de Montbrial | France | Director, French Institute of International Relations; Professor of Economics, Ecole Polytechnique |
| Mario Monti | Italy | Professor of Economics and Director of the Centre for Monetary and Financial Economics, Bocconi University |
| Beatrix of the Netherlands | Netherlands | |
| Prince Claus of the Netherlands | Netherlands | |
| Tommaso Padoa-Schioppa | Italy | Deputy Director General, Banca d'Italia |
| Michael Palliser | United Kingdom | Chairman, Samuel Montagu & Co. Limited; Chairman of the Council, International Institute for Strategic Studies |
| Robert L. Pfaltzgraff | United States | President, Institute for Foreign Policy Analysis |
| Herbert Pundik | Denmark | Editor-in-Chief, Politiken |
| Robert P. Reid | United Kingdom | Chairman, Shell UK |
| Malcolm Rifkind | United Kingdom | Secretary of State for Scotland |
| Michel Rocard | France | Member of Parliament (Socialist Party) |
| Mariano Rubio | Spain | Governor, Bank of Spain |
| Renato Ruggiero | Italy | General Secretary, Ministry for Foreign Affairs |
| John Sainsbury | United Kingdom | Chairman, J. Sainsbury |
| Jeanne Sauvé | Canada | Governor General of Canada |
| Gaetano Scardocchia | Italy | Editor, La Stampa |
| Walter Scheel | Federal Republic of Germany | Former President; Former Chairman of Bilderberg Meetings |
| Helmut Schmidt | Federal Republic of Germany | Former Chancellor |
| E. Antoine Seilliere | France | Director-General, Compagnie Generale d'Industrie et de Participations |
| Patrick Sheehy | United Kingdom | Chairman, A.T. Industries |
| Artur Santos Silva | Portugal | Former Under Secretary of the Treasury; Former Vice President, Bank of Portugal; President, Banco Portugues de Investimento |
| John Smith | United Kingdom | Member of Parliament (Labour Party) |
| Theo Sommer | Federal Republic of Germany | Publisher, Die Zeit |
| Luigi Spaventa | Italy | Professor of Economics, University of Rome |
| David Steel | United Kingdom | Member of Parliament, Leader of the Liberal Party |
| Frank Swaelen | Belgium | President, Christian Democratic Party |
| Seyfi Taşhan | Turkey | Managing Director, Foreign Policy Institute |
| Nils Morten Udgaard | Norway | Deputy Secretary, Prime Minister's Office |
| Paul Volcker | United States | Chairman, Board of Governors of the Federal Reserve System |
| Angelika Volle | Federal Republic of Germany | Research Fellow, German Council on Foreign Relations |
| Franz Vranitzky | Austria | Federal Minister of Finance |
| Charles, Prince of Wales | United Kingdom | |
| Niels Werring | Norway | Chairman of the Board, Wilh. Wilhelmsen |
| John C. Whitehead | United States | Deputy Secretary of State |
| Nils Wilhjelm | Denmark | Minister of Industry |
| Lynn R. Williams | United States | International President, United Steel Workers of America |
| Frank G. Wisner | United States | Deputy Assistant Secretary for African Affairs, Department of State |
| Otto Wolff von Amerongen | Federal Republic of Germany | Chairman of the Board of Management and Chief Executive Officer, Otto Wolff |
| Juan A. Yanez-Barnuevo | Spain | Director, Department of International Affairs of the Office of the Prime Minister |
| David Young | United Kingdom | Secretary of State for Employment |
| Paolo Zannoni | Italy | Vice President, Defense Systems, Fiat USA |
| Alfredo Ambrosetti | Italy | President, Studio Ambrosetti; Organizer 1987 Conference |
| Saskia ten Asbroek | Netherlands | Executive Secretary, Bilderberg Meetings |
| Alec S. Donkin | United Kingdom | Organizer, 1986 Conference |
| Charles W. Muller | United States | President, Murden and Company |

=== 1987 Conference ===
| Participants | Nationality | Title |
|---|---|---|
| Gianni Agnelli | Italy | President, Fiat |
| Gündüz Aktan | Turkey | Adviser to the Prime Minister, Ministry for Foreign Affairs |
| Paul A. Allaire | United States | President, Xerox Corporation |
| Tage Andersen | Denmark | Managing Director and Chief Executive, Den Danske Bank |
| Dwayne Andreas | United States | Chairman, Archer-Daniels-Midland |
| Hannes Androsch | Austria | Chairman of the Managing Board of Directors, Creditanstalt-Bankverein; Former Minister of Finance; Former Vice Chancellor |
| Michael R. Angus | United Kingdom | Chairman, Unilever |
| Nils Astrup Hoel | Norway | Chairman of the Board, Fearnley & Eger |
| Egon Bahr | Federal Republic of Germany | Member of Parliament; General Secretary of the SPD |
| George Ball | United States | Former Under Secretary of State |
| Édouard Balladur | France | Minister of State; Minister of Economics, Finance and Privatization |
| Francisco Pinto Balsemão | Portugal | Director, Jornal Expresso; Former Prime Minister |
| Thomas J. Bata | Canada | Chairman, Bata Limited |
| Jack F. Bennett | United States | Director and Senior Vice President, Exxon Corporation; Former Under-Secretary of the Treasury for Monetary Affairs |
| Christoph Bertram | Federal Republic of Germany | Diplomatic Correspondent, Die Zeit |
| Selahattin Beyazıt | Turkey | Director of Companies |
| Conrad Black | Canada | Chairman, Argus Corporation |
| Richard R. Burt | United States | Ambassador to the Federal Republic of Germany |
| Luigi Caligaris | Italy | Author and Defence Correspondent |
| Guido Carli | Italy | Senator; Former Governor, Banca d'Italia |
| Costa-Gavras | Greece | Director of Companies |
| Peter Carrington | United Kingdom | Secretary General, NATO |
| Juan Luis Cebrián | Spain | Director and Editor-in-Chief, El Pais |
| Carlo Azeglio Ciampi | Italy | Governor, Banca d'Italia |
| Francesco Cingano | Italy | Chairman, Banca Commerciale Italiana |
| Kenneth W. Dam | United States | Vice President, Law and External Relations, IBM Corporation; Former Deputy Secretary of State |
| Richard Darman | United States | Managing Director, Shearson Lehman Brothers; Former Deputy Secretary, Department of the Treasury |
| Étienne Davignon | Belgium | Director, Societe Generale de Belgique; Former Member of the Commission of the European Communities |
| Arthur Dunkel | Switzerland | Director General, General Agreement on Tariffs and Trade |
| Fredrik Stefan Eaton | Canada | President and Chief Executive Officer, Eaton's of Canada Limited |
| Uffe Ellemann-Jensen | Denmark | Minister for Foreign Affairs |
| Murray Finley | United States | President, Amalgamated Clothing and Textile Workers Union |
| Garret FitzGerald | Ireland | Former Prime Minister |
| John S. Foster Jr. | United States | Vice President, TRW |
| Raul Gardini | Italy | Chairman, Ferruzzi |
| Paul Girolami | United Kingdom | Chairman, Glaxo Holdings |
| Maynard W. Glitman | United States | Negotiator on Intermediate Range Nuclear Arms |
| Anthony G.S. Griffin | Canada | Director of Companies |
| Sten Gustafsson | Sweden | Chairman of the Board, SAAB-SCANIA |
| Geir Hallgrímsson | Iceland | Governor, Central Bank of Iceland; Former Prime Minister; Former Minister for Foreign Affairs |
| Helmut H. Haschek | Austria | Chairman of the Board, Osterreichische Kontrollbank |
| Hans Heckmann | Switzerland | Executive Vice President and Member of the Executive Board, Union Bank of Switzerland |
| Alfred Herrhausen | Federal Republic of Germany | Managing Director, Deutsche Bank |
| Jaakko Iloniemi | Finland | Member of the Management Board, Union Bank of Finland; Former Ambassador to the United States of America |
| Paul R. Jolles | Switzerland | Chairman of the Board, Nestle S.A.; Former State Secretary for Foreign Economic Affairs |
| Thomas V. Jones | United States | Chairman of the Board and Chief Executive Officer, Northrop Corporation |
| Vernon E. Jordan, Jr. | United States | Partner, Akin, Gump, Strauss, Hauer & Feld (Attorneys-at-Law); Former President, National Urban League |
| Henry Kissinger | United States | Professor, Center for Strategic and International Studies, Georgetown University; Former Secretary of State |
| Cor J. Van Der Klugt | Netherlands | President, Philips Gloeilampenfabrieken |
| Andrew Knight | United Kingdom | Chief Executive, The Daily Telegraph |
| Max Kohnstamm | Netherlands | Former President, European University Institute |
| Marc Ladreit de Lacharrière | France | Vice President, L'Oreal |
| Léon Lambert | Belgium | Chairman, Groupe Bruxelles Lambert |
| Emiel van Lennep | Netherlands | Former Secretary General, OECD |
| Hans-Adam II, Prince of Liechtenstein | Liechtenstein | |
| Winston Lord | United States | Ambassador to the People's Republic of China |
| Frantz J. Lutolf | Switzerland | General Manager and Member of the Executive Board, Swiss Bank Corporation |
| Charles Mathias | United States | Former U.S. Senator |
| Jose Eduardo Moniz | Portugal | Director of Information, Rádio e Televisão de Portugal |
| Thierry de Montbrial | France | Director, French Institute of International Relations; Professor of Economics, Ecole Polytechnique |
| Mario Monti | Italy | Professor of Economics and Director of the Centre for Monetary and Financial Economics, Bocconi University, Milan |
| Queen Beatrix of the Netherlands | Netherlands | |
| Prince Claus of the Netherlands | Netherlands | |
| Davíð Oddsson | Iceland | Mayor of Reykjavik |
| Fernando Faria de Oliveira | Portugal | Executive Vice President, IPE |
| Yiannos Papantoniou | Greece | Under-Secretary, Ministry of National Economy |
| François Perigot | France | Chairman of the National Council, Patronat Francais |
| Hugo Portisch | Austria | Publicist |
| Charles H. Price II | United States | Ambassador to the United Kingdom of Great Britain and Northern Ireland |
| Romano Prodi | Italy | Chairman, IRI |
| Franco Reviglio | Italy | Chairman, ENI |
| Rozanne L. Ridgway | United States | Assistant Secretary of State for European and Canadian Affairs |
| David Rockefeller | United States | Chairman, Chase Manhattan Bank International Advisory Committee |
| Bernard W. Rogers | United States | Supreme Allied Commander Europe (SHAPE) |
| Cesare Romiti | Italy | Chief Executive Officer, Fiat |
| Renato Ruggiero | Italy | General Secretary, Ministry for Foreign Affairs |
| Julian Santamaria | Spain | Ambassador to the United States of America |
| Gaetano Scardocchia | Italy | Editor, La Stampa |
| Jorgen Schleimann | Denmark | Managing Director and Chief Executive, TV 2 |
| E. Antoine Seilliere | France | Director-General, Compagnie Generale d'Industrie et de Participations |
| Theo Sommer | Federal Republic of Germany | Publisher, Die Zeit |
| Antoinette Spaak | Belgium | Minister of State; Former Chairman, Federation des Francophones |
| Hubert Védrine | France | Former Foreign Policy Adviser to the President |
| Paul Volcker | United States | Chairman, Board of Governors of the Federal Reserve System |
| Joris Voorhoeve | Netherlands | Parliamentary Leader of the VVD |
| Franz Vranitzky | Austria | Federal Chancellor |
| Lodewijk Christiaan van Wachem | Netherlands | President, Royal Dutch Petroleum Company |
| William Waldegrave | United Kingdom | Minister for the Environment, Countryside and Planning |
| Peter Wallenberg | Sweden | Vice Chairman, Skandinaviska Enskilda |
| Norman Webster | Canada | Editor-in-Chief, The Globe and Mail |
| Niels Werring | Norway | Chairman of the Board, Wilh. Wilhelmsen Limited |
| John C. Whitehead | United States | Deputy Secretary of State |
| Brayton Wilbur, Jr. | United States | Executive Vice President, Wilbur Ellis Company |
| Lynn R. Williams | United States | International President, United Steel Workers of America |
| Kåre Willoch | Norway | Member of Parliament; Former Prime Minister |
| James Wolfensohn | United States | President, James D. Wolfensohn, Inc. |
| Otto Wolff von Amerongen | Federal Republic of Germany | Chairman of the Supervisory Board, Otto Wolff |
| Juan A. Yanez-Barnuevo | Spain | Director, Department of International Affairs of the Office of the Prime Minister |
| Zekeriya Yıldırım | Turkey | Governor of the Central Bank |
| Paolo Zannoni | Italy | Vice President, Defence Systems, Fiat USA |
| Hans L. Zetterberg | Sweden | Editor-in-Chief, Svenska Dagbladet |

=== 1988 Conference ===
| Participants | Nationality | Title |
|---|---|---|
| Gianni Agnelli | Italy | President, Fiat |
| Tage Andersen | Denmark | Managing Director and Chief Executive, Den Danske Bank |
| Dwayne O. Andreas | United States | Chairman, Archer-Daniels-Midland Company, Inc. |
| Andreas Andrianopoulos | Greece | Mayor of Piraeus; Former Minister of Culture |
| Hannes Androsch | Austria | Former Chairman of the Managing Board of Directors, Creditanstalt-Bankverein; Former Minister of Finance; Former Vice Chancellor |
| George W. Ball | United States | Former Under-Secretary of State |
| Francisco Pinto Balsemao | Portugal | Director, Jornal Expresso; Former Prime Minister |
| Enrique Baron | Spain | Vice President, European Parliament; President, European Movement; Former Minister of Transport |
| Jack F. Bennett | United States | Director and Senior Vice President, Exxon Corporation; Former Under-Secretary of the Treasury for Monetary Affairs |
| Ernst H. van der Beugel | Netherlands | Emeritus Professor of International Relations, Leyden University; Director of Companies |
| Selahattin Beyazit | Turkey | Director of Companies |
| Bjorn Bjarnason | Iceland | Assistant Editor-in-Chief, Morgunbladid |
| Conrad M. Black | Canada | Chairman, Argus Corporation |
| Shirley Temple Black | United States | Foreign Affairs Officer, Department of State; Former Ambassador to the Republic of Ghana |
| Franz Blankart | Switzerland | State Secretary for External Economic Affairs, Federal Department of Public Economy |
| Ali Bozer | Turkey | Minister of State |
| Nicolas F. Brady | United States | Co-Chairman, Dillon, Read & Co.; Former U.S. Senator |
| Hans van den Broek | Netherlands | Minister for Foreign Affairs |
| Francois Bujon de LEstang | France | Minister Plenipotentiary; Former Adviser for Diplomatic Affairs, Defence and Cooperation in the Cabinet of Mr. Jacques Chirac |
| Staffan Burenstam Linder | Sweden | President, Stockholm School of Economics; Former Minister of Trade; Former Member of Parliament |
| Costa Carras | Greece | Director of Companies |
| Jaime Carvajal Urquijo | Spain | Chairman and General Manager, Iberfomento |
| Juan Luis Cebrian | Spain | Director and Editor-in-Chief, El Pais |
| Marshall A. Cohen | Canada | President, Olympia & York Enterprises Limited |
| Vitor M. R. Constancio | Portugal | Leader of the Socialist Party; Former Governor, Banco de Portugal; Former Secretary of State for Budget and Planning |
| James Craig | United Kingdom | Director General, The Middle East Association |
| Kenneth W. Dam | United States | Vice President, Law and External Relations, IBM Corporation; Former Deputy Secretary of State |
| Etienne Davignon | Belgium | Director, Societe Generale de Belgique; Former Member of the Commission of the European Communities |
| Gerard Eskenazi | France | President, Pargesa Holding |
| Daniel J. Evans | United States | U.S. Senator |
| Thomas S. Foley | United States | U.S. Representative |
| Jean A. Francois-Poncet | France | Senator; Former Minister for Foreign Affairs |
| John R. Galvin | United States | Supreme Allied Commander Europe (SHAPE) |
| Katharine Graham | United States | Chairman, The Washington Post Company |
| FIN | Canada | Director of Companies |
| Henry A. Grunwald | United States | Ambassador to Austria; Former Editor-in-Chief, Time, Inc. |
| Sten Gustafsson | Sweden | Chairman of the Board, SAAB-SCANIA |
| Geir Hallgrimsson | Iceland | Governor, Central Bank of Iceland; Former Prime Minister; Former Minister for Foreign Affairs |
| Helmut H. Haschek | Austria | Chairman of the Board, Osterreichische Kontrollbank A.G. |
| Francois Heisbourg | France | Director, The International Institute for Strategic Studies |
| Alfred Herrhausen | Federal Republic of Germany | Managing Director, Deutsche Bank |
| Friedrich Hoess | Austria | Ambassador to the United States of America |
| Karen Elliott House | United States | Foreign Editor, The Wall Street Journal |
| William G. Hyland | United States | Editor, Foreign Affairs |
| Hans Igler | Austria | Partner, Schoeller Co. Bankaktiengesellschaft |
| Jaakko Iloniemi | Finland | Member of the Management Board, Union Bank of Finland; Former Ambassador to the United States of America |
| Peter Jankowitsch | Austria | Chairman of the Foreign Policy Committee of the National Assembly; Former Minister for Foreign Affairs |
| Nancy Landon Kassebaum | United States | U.S. Senator |
| David T. Kearns | United States | Chairman, Xerox Corporation |
| John Keegan | United Kingdom | Military Historian; Defence Correspondent, The Daily Telegraph |
| Lane Kirkland | United States | President, American Federation of Labor and Congress of Industrial Organizations (AFL-CIO) |
| Henry A. Kissinger | United States | Former Secretary of State; Chairman, Kissinger Associates, Inc. |
| Thomas Klestil | Austria | Secretary General, Federal Ministry for Foreign Affairs |
| Andrew Knight | United Kingdom | Chief Executive, The Daily Telegraph |
| Helmut Kohl | Federal Republic of Germany | Federal Chancellor |
| Max Kohnstamm | Netherlands | Former President, European University Institute |
| Pedro Pablo Kuczynski | United States | Co-Chairman, First Boston International |
| Marc Ladreit de Lacharriere | France | Director and First Executive Vice President, L'Oreal |
| Giorgio La Malfa | Italy | National Secretary, Italian Republican Party (PRI) |
| Alexandre Lamfalussy | Belgium | General Manager, Bank for International Settlements |
| Drew Lewis | United States | Chairman, Union Pacific Corporation |
| Andre Leysen | Belgium | Chairman of the Board, Gevaert N.V.; Vice-chairman, Union of Industrial and Employers Confederations of Europe (UNICE) |
| Franz J. Lutolf | Switzerland | General Manager and Member of the Executive Board, Swiss Bank Corporation |
| Donald S. MacDonald | Canada | Senior Partner, McCarthy & McCarthy |
| Floris A. Maijers | Netherlands | Chairman of the Board of Management, Unilever N.V. |
| Stephen N. Marris | United Kingdom | Senior Fellow, Institute for International Economics; Former Economic Adviser to the Secretary General, OECD |
| Charles McC. Mathias, Jr. | United States | Partner, Jones, Day, Reavis & Pogue; Former U.S. Senator |
| Thierry de Montbrial | France | Director, French Institute of International Relations; Professor of Economics, Ecole Polytechnique |
| Mario Monti | Italy | Professor of Economics, Bocconi University; Vice-chairman, Banca Commerciale Italiana |
| Rupert Murdoch | United States | Chairman, News America Publishing |
| Her Majesty The Queen Beatrix of the Netherlands | Netherlands | |
| His Royal Highness Prince Claus of the Netherlands | Netherlands | |
| Anton Osond | Austria | Chairman of the Board of Management, Osterreichische Investitionskredit |
| Theodoros Pangalos | Greece | Alternate Minister for Foreign Affairs |
| Jean-Claude Paye | France | Secretary General, OECD |
| Donald E. Petersen | United States | Chairman, Ford Motor Company |
| Francisco Lucas Pires | Portugal | Member of the European Parliament; Former Leader of the Christian Democrats |
| Inger E. Prebensen | Norway | President, Kjobmandsbanken |
| Lord Prior | United Kingdom | Chairman, GEC plc; Former Secretary of State for Emploment for Northern Ireland |
| Grant L. Reuber | Canada | Deputy Chairman, Bank of Montreal |
| Rozanne L. Ridgway | United States | Assistant Secretary of State for European and Canadian Affairs |
| James D. Robinson III | United States | Chairman and Chief Executive Officer, American Express Company |
| David Rockefeller | United States | Chairman, Chase Manhattan Bank International Advisory Committee |
| Olivier Roy | France | University Professor and Researcher, Centre National de Recherches Scientifiques (CNRS) |
| Charles S. Sanford, Jr. | United States | Chairman, Bankers Trust Company |
| Rüşdü Saraçoğlu | Turkey | Governor, Central Bank of the Republic of Turkey |
| Guido Schmidt-Chiari | Austria | Chairman of the Managing Board of Directors, Creditanstalt-Bankverein |
| David G. Scholey | United Kingdom | Chairman, S.G. Warburg Group |
| Brent Scowcroft | United States | Vice Chairman, Kissinger Associates, Inc.; Former Assistant to President Ford for National Security Affairs |
| Jack Sheinkman | United States | President, Amalgamated Clothing and Textile Workers Union, AFL-CIO, CLC |
| Gary G. Sick | United States | Visiting Scholar, Research Institute on International Change, Columbia University |
| Gordon S. Smith | Canada | Permanent Representative and Ambassador, Delegation of Canada to the North Atlantic Council |
| Theo Sommer | Federal Republic of Germany | Editor-in-Chief, Die Zeit |
| Ugo Stille | Italy | Editor-in-Chief, Corriere della Sera |
| Ilkka Suominen | Finland | Minister of Trade and Industry |
| Horst Teltschik | FRG | Head of the Directorate-General for Foreign and Intra-German Relations, Development Policy and External Security, Federal Chancellery |
| Anders Thunborg | Sweden | Ambassador to the Soviet Union; Former Minister of Defence |
| Niels Thygesen | Denmark | Professor of Economics, University of Copenhagen |
| Friedrich Verzetnitsch | Austria | President, Austrian Trade Union |
| Karsten D. Voigt | Federal Republic of Germany | Member of Parliament; SPD Spokesman on Foreign Affairs; Member, SPD Party Leadership |
| Paul A. Volcker | United States | Former Chairman, Board of Governors of the Federal Reserve System |
| Franz Vranitzky | Austria | Federal Chancellor |
| William Waldegrave | United Kingdom | Minister of State for Housing and Planning, Department of the Environment |
| Niels Werring, Jr. | Norway | Chairman of the Board, Wilh. Wilhelmsen |
| Lynn R. Williams | United States | International President, United Steel Workers of America |
| James D. Wolfensohn | United States | President, The World Bank Group |
| Otto Wolff von Amerongen | Federal Republic of Germany | Chairman of the Supervisory Board, Otto Wolff |
| Walter B. Wriston | United States | Former Chairman, Citibank |
| Juan A. Yanez-Barnuevo | Spain | Director, Department of International Affairs, Office of the Prime Minister |
| Emilio de Ybarra y Clurruca | Spain | Vice Chairman and Managing Director, BBVA |
| Paolo Zannoni | Italy | President, Fiat Washington |
| Georg Zimmer-Lehmann | Austria | Senior Advisor to the Managing Board of Director, Creditanstalt-Bankverein |

=== 2026 Conference ===
| Names | | Nationality | Title | | |
| Last name | First name | Nationality | Role | Organisation | Industry |
Chairs
| de Castries | Henry | France | President | Institut Montaigne | Political think tank |
| Kravis | Marie-Josée | United States | Chair | The Museum of Modern Art (MoMA) | Art museum |
Participants
| Abrams | Stacey | United States | CEO | Sage Works Production | Production (film, TV, documentary) |
| Alverà | Marco | Italy | Co-founder | Zhero.net | Renewable energy developer |
| Alverà | Marco | Italy | CEO | TES | Hydrogen energy |
| Applebaum | Anne | United States | Staff writer | The Atlantic | Information (magazine) |
| Auchincloss | Murray | United Kingdom | Former CEO | BP plc | Oil and gas |
| Barroso | José Manuel | Portugal | Chair international advisors | Goldman Sachs International | Investment bank / financial services |
| Baudson | Valérie | France | CEO | Amundi SA | Asset management |
| Berg | Caroline | Sweden | CEO | Axel Johnson | Retail |
| Bessent | Scott | United States | Secretary | US Department of Treasury | Government |
| Birol | Fatih | Turkey | Executive director | International Energy Agency | Intergovernmental organisation |
| Boël | Harold | Belgium | CEO | Sofina | Holding (consumer goods, B2B, telecommunications, private equity, banking, insurance, energy, food distribution) |
| Bosek | Peter | Austria | CEO / Chief Retail Officer | Erste Group Bank AG | Banking |
| Brende | Børge | Norway | President and CEO | World Economic Forum | International advocacy NGO |
| Buldiger | Helene | Switzerland | State secretary | Swiss State Secretariat for Economic Affairs | Government |
| Busch | Roland | Germany | President and CEO | Siemens AG | Industrial conglomerate (industrial automation, building automation, rail transport, energy and health technology) |
| Calviño | Nadia | Spain | President | European Investment Bank | Intergovernmental investment bank |
| Cantell | Aaro | Finland | Chair | Normet Group | Underground mining and tunnelling equipment |
| Carney | Mark J. | Canada | Prime Minister | Government of Canada | Government |
| Cavendish | Camilla | United Kingdom | Member | House of Lords of the UK | Parliament |
| Koç | Ali | Turkey | Vice President | Koç Holding | Holding |
| Özyeğin | Murat | Turkey | Chair | Fiba Holding | Holding |
| Sinirlioğlu | Feridun | Turkey | Secretary General | Organization for Security and Co-operation in Europe | Intergovernmental organisation |
| Tara | Mehmet | Turkey | Chair | ENKA | Industrial conglomerate |
| Zarakol | Ayşe | Turkey | Political scientist | University of Cambridge | Academia |

== Austria ==
- Oscar Bronner (2008–2011, 2013), publisher and Editor, Der Standard

== Canada ==
=== Academics and public intellectuals ===
- François-Philippe Champagne, Minister of Finance and National Revenue of Canada
- Chrystia Freeland, Minister of Transport of Canada
- Mark Carney, (2025, 2024) Prime Minister of Canada
- James Orbinski, (2011), professor of Medicine and political science, University of Toronto; president of the International Council of Médecins Sans Frontières (MSF) when the organization received the 1999 Nobel Peace Prize

=== Journalists and media figures ===
- Peter Mansbridge (2010), CBC's chief correspondent and anchor of The National, CBC Television's flagship nightly newscast
- Conrad Black, Baron Black of Crossharbour, (1981, 1983, 1985–1997), Hollinger International, author and former media magnate
- Robert Prichard (2010), president of Ontario's Metrolinx
- Heather Reisman (2000–present), CEO of Chapters/Indigo, co-founder of the HESEG Foundation
- David Frum (1997), Canadian American journalist, former economic speechwriter for President George W. Bush

=== Business leaders ===
- Evan Siddall (2024), CEO of the Alberta Investment Management Corporation

== China ==
- Huang Yiping (2011, 2012), professor of Economics, China Center for Economic Research, Peking University

== Denmark ==
=== Business leaders ===
- Christian Dyvig (2016), Chairman, Kompan
- Ulrik Federspiel (2016), Group Executive, Haldor Topsøe

=== Journalists and media figures ===
- Tøger Seidenfaden (1999, 2001–03), editor-in-chief, Politiken (deceased)

== Finland ==
| Participant | Title | Years of participation |
|---|---|---|
| Johan Nykopp | mountain counselor | 1963 |
| Johan Nykopp | mountain counselor | 1964 |
| Johan Nykopp | mountain counselor | 1965 |
| Johan Nykopp | mountain counselor | 1966 |
| Johan Nykopp | mountain counselor | 1967 |
| Johan Nykopp | mountain counselor | 1968 |
| Johan Nykopp | mountain counselor | 1969 |
| Johan Nykopp | mountain counselor | 1970 |
| Johan Nykopp | mountain counselor | 1970 |
| Ralph Enckell | ambassador | 1971 |
| Jacob Albert Carl Gustaf von Julin | mountain counselor | 1971 |
| Johan Nykopp | mountain counselor | 1972 |
| Sakari T. Lehto | minister | 1973 |
| Reino Rossi | minister | 1974 |
| Max Jakobson | ambassador | 1975 |
| Mika Tiivola | minister | 1978 |
| Klaus Waris | Sitran attorney general | 1980 |
| Tankmar Horn | minister | 1981 |
| Fredrik Castrén | mountain counselor | 1982 |
| Fredrik Castrén | mountain counselor | 1983 |
| Jaakko Iloniemi | Union Bank board member | 1984 |
| Jaakko Iloniemi | Union Bank board member | 1985 |
| Jaakko Iloniemi | Union Bank board member | 1987 |
| Jaakko Iloniemi | Union Bank board member | 1988 |
| Ilkka Suominen | Minister of Finance and Industry | 1988 |
| Casimir Ehrnrooth | Vuorineuvos | 1989 |
| Kalevi Sorsa | Parliament chairman | 1990 |
| Jaakko Iloniemi | Union Bank board member | 1990 |
| Jaakko Iloniemi | Union Bank board member | 1991 |
| Jaakko Iloniemi | Union Bank board member | 1992 |
| Jaakko Iloniemi | Union Bank board member | 1993 |
| Aatos Erkko | CEO of Helsinki Sanomat | 1991 |
| Ulf Sundqvist | Bank director | 1992 |
| Jarl Köhler | CEO | 1992 |
| Jarl Köhler | CEO | 1993 |
| Mirja Lehtinen | local organizer | 1994 |
| Johannes Koroma | Confederation of Finnish Industry and Employersis the Director General | 1993 |
| Martti Ahtisaari | President of the Republic | 1994 |
| Esko Aho | Prime Minister | 1994 |
| Krister Ahlström | Mountain Councilor | 1994 |
| Martti Ahtisaari | President of the Republic | 1995 |
| Pertti Voutilainen | mountain counselor | 1995 |
| Martti Ahtisaari | president of the republic | 1996 |
| Pertti Voutilainen | mountain councilor | 1996 |
| Jorma Ollila | CEO | 1997 |
| Sauli Niinistö | Minister of Finance | 1997 |
| Janne Virkkunen | Editor-in-chief of Helsinki Sanomat | 1998 |
| Paavo Lipponen | Prime Minister | 1998 |
| Pentti Vartia | Economist | 1999 |
| Matti Vanhala | Governor of the Bank of Finland | 1999 |
| Paavo Lipponen | Prime Minister | 2001 |
| Janne Virkkunen | Editor-in-chief of Helsinki Sanomat | 2001 |
| Olli-Pekka Heinonen | Minister of Transport | 2001 |
| Jorma Ollila | CEO | 2001 |
| Jorma Ollila | CEO | 2003 |
| Björn Wahlroos | bank director | 2003 |
| Olli Kivinen | editor | 2003 |
| Paula Lehtomäki | Minister of the Environment | 2004 |
| Jorma Ollila | CEO | 2005 |
| Teija Tiilikainen | Director of the European Studies Network at the University of Helsinki | 2005 |
| Mikael Pentikäinen | CEO of Sanoma News | 2005 |
| Erkki Liikanen | Governor of the Bank of Finland | 2005 |
| Björn Wahlroos | bank director | 2010 |
| Jyrki Katainen | Minister of Finance | 2010 |
| Antti Blåfield | Editor-in-Chief of Helsinki Sanomat | 2010 |
| Jorma Ollila | CEO | 2010 |
| Jorma Ollila | CEO | 2011 |
| Mikael Pentikäinen | Sanoma News CEO | 2011 |
| Björn Wahlroos | bank director | 2011 |
| Ole Johansson | mountain councilor | 2011 |
| Björn Wahlroos | bank director | 2012 |
| Jutta Urpilainen | minister of finance | 2013 |
| Jorma Ollila | CEO | 2013 |
| Jorma Ollila | CEO | 2014 |
| Björn Wahlroos | bank director | 2014 |
| Matti Apunen | Head of the Business Delegation | 2013 |
| Olli Heinonen | Deputy Secretary-General of the International Atomic Energy Agency | 2013 |
| Björn Wahlroos | Bank Director | 2013 |
| Matti Apunen | Head of the Business Delegation | 2014 |
| Matti Alahuhta | CEOa | 2014 |
| Henrik Ehrnrooth | investor | 2014 |
| Risto Siilasmaa | CEO | 2014 |
| Kari Stadigh | CEO | 2014 |
| Alexander Stubb | prime minister | 2015 |
| Leena Mörttinen | CEO | 2015 |
| Björn Wahlroos | Bank Director | 2016 |
| Matti Apunen | Head of the Business Delegation | 2016 |
| Anne Berner | Minister of Transport | 2017 |
| Antti Herlin | Chairman of the Board | 2018 |
| Björn Wahlroos | bank director | 2018 |
| Elina Lepomäki | member of the parliament | 2018 |
| Erkki Liikanen | Governor of the Bank of Finland | 2019 |
| Erkki Liikanen | Governor of the Bank of Finland | 2025 |
| Jussi Herlin | Deputy Speaker of the Government | 2025 |
| Sanna Marin | former Prime Minister | 2025 |
| Alexander Stubb | President of the Republic | 2025 |

== France ==
=== Business leaders ===
- Patricia Barbizet (2016), CEO, Artemis
- Nicolas Baverez (2016), partner, Gibson, Dunn & Crutcher
- Michel Bon, former CEO of France Telecom
- Tom Enders (2011), CEO of Airbus
- André Lévy-Lang, (in French) former CEO of Paribas
- Baron Edmond de Rothschild (1977), French-Swiss banker, philanthropist

=== Academics and public intellectuals ===
- C. Fred Bergsten (1971, 1974, 1984, 1997), president, Peterson Institute
- Olivier Blanchard (2016), Fred Bergsten Senior Fellow, Peterson Institute
- Emmanuelle Charpentier (2016), director, Max Planck Institute for Infection Biology
- Thierry de Montbrial, director of the Institut Français des Relations Internationales

=== Journalists and media figures ===
- Nicolas Beytout, (in French) editor of Le Figaro (France)
- Etienne Gernelle (2016, 2017), editorial director, Le Point
- Érik Izraelewicz (2012), CEO of Le Monde (deceased)

== Germany ==
=== Business leaders ===
- Josef Ackermann (2008–2011, 2013), CEO of Deutsche Bank
- Otto Wolff von Amerongen, chairman Otto Wolff
- Werner Baumann (2017), chairman, Bayer
- Hans-Christian Boos (2019), CEO and founder, Arago
- Frank Bsirske (2017), chairman, United Services Union
- Thomas Enders (2016), CEO, Airbus Group
- Ulrich Grillo (2016), chairman, Grillo-Werke; president, Bundesverband der Deutschen Industrie
- Timotheus Höttges (2016), CEO, Deutsche Telekom
- Sonja Jost (2019), CEO, DexLeChem
- Joe Kaeser (2016), president and CEO, Siemens
- Susanne Klatten (2017), managing Director, SKion
- Klaus Kleinfeld (2008–2013), chairman and CEO of Alcoa
- Jürgen E. Schrempp (1994–1996, 1997, 1998, 1999, 2001–2005, 2006, 2007), former CEO of DaimlerChrysler
- Dieter Zetsche (2019), former chairman, Daimler AGDEU

=== Academics and public intellectuals ===
- Renate Köcher (2018), managing director, Allensbach Institute for Public Opinion Research
- Hans-Werner Sinn (2016), professor for Economics and Public Finance, LMU Munich
- Constanze Stelzenmüller (2022), Fritz Stern Chair, The Brookings Institution

=== Journalists and media figures ===
- Mathias Döpfner (2016–2019), chairman and CEO, Axel Springer SE
- Thomas Ebeling (2016), CEO, ProSiebenSat.1
- Julia Jäkel (2016), CEO, Gruner + Jahr

== Greece ==
=== Business leaders ===
- George A. David (2009–2011), chairman of Coca-Cola Hellenic
- George Logothetis (2016), chairman and CEO, Libra Group
- Dimitris Papalexopoulos (2008, 2009, 2012, 2016), CEO, Titan Cement

=== Academics and public intellectuals ===
- Loukas Tsoukalis (2009–2012), president of the Hellenic Foundation for European and Foreign Policy

=== Journalists and media figures ===
- Alexis Papahelas (2008, 2009), managing editor of Kathimerini

== Iceland ==
- Hörður Sigurgestsson, former CEO of shipping line Eimskip, former chairman and CFO of Icelandair

== Ireland ==
- Peter Sutherland (1989–1996, 1997, 2005), former chairman of BP (deceased)
- Denis O'Brien, billionaire with a variety of business interests (including Digicel, Communicorp, Independent News & Media, Irish Water and Topaz Energy)
- Michael O'Leary (2015–2016), CEO, Ryanair

== Italy ==
=== Business Leaders ===
- Gianni Agnelli (1997), honorary chairman of Fiat Automobiles (deceased)
- Umberto Agnelli (1997), chairman of IFIL (deceased)
- Franco Bernabè (2011, 2013, 2016), CEO of Telecom Italia
- John Elkann (2008–2012, 2014–2016), chairman and CEO, EXOR; chairman, Fiat Chrysler Automobiles

=== Academics and public intellectuals ===
- Carlo Ratti (2016), director, MIT Senseable City Lab

=== Journalists and media figures ===
- Carlo Rossella (1997), editor, La Stampa
- Lilli Gruber (2012, 2016), journalist; anchorwoman, La7

== Netherlands ==
=== Business leaders ===
- Ben van Beurden (2016, 2022, 2023), Special Advisor to the Board, Shell plc; former CEO, Shell plc
- Dolf van den Brink (2023), CEO, Heineken N.V.
- Charlene de Carvalho (2024), Executive Director, Heineken Holding N.V.
- Jean Marc Huët (2022), chairman, Heineken N.V.
- Jeroen van der Veer (in Dutch) former CEO, Shell plc
- Peter Wennink (2022, 2023), president and CEO, ASML Holding

=== Academics and public intellectuals ===
- Victor Halberstadt (2000–2012, 2016, 2022, 2023, 2024), professor emeritus of Economics, Leiden University; former co-chair of Bilderberg Meetings; former honorary secretary general of Bilderberg Meetings
- Robbert Dijkgraaf (2013), mathematical physicist, director and Leon Levy professor at the Institute for Advanced Study in Princeton, professor at the University of Amsterdam

== Norway ==
- Svein Richard Brandtzæg (2016), president and CEO, Norsk Hydro
- Jens Chr. Hauge, member of the group's board; industrialist, who resigned as minister of justice in 1955; minister of defence appointment in 1945
- Helge Lund (2019), chairman of BP and Novo.
- Kristin Skogen Lund (2016), director general, Confederation of Norwegian Enterprise

== Poland ==
- Jacek Szwajcowski (2004, 2005), CEO of Polska Grupa Farmaceutyczna (Polish Pharmaceutical Group)
- Grzegorz Hajdarowicz (2018), CEO of GREMI International

== Portugal ==
- Manuel Ferreira de Oliveira, CEO of Galp Energia
- Ricardo Salgado, CEO of Banco Espírito Santo
- Carlos Gomes da Silva (2016), vice chairman and CEO, Galp Energia

== Russia ==
- Anatoly Chubais (1998, 2012, 2024), head of the Russian Nanotechnology Corporation (2008–2020); visiting professor, London School of Economics; founded the Center for Russian Studies (CRS) at the Faculty of Social Sciences at Tel Aviv University; member of The Global Board of Advisors of the Council on Foreign Relations
- Alexei Mordashov (2011), CEO of Severstal
- Sergei Guriev (2015), 10th dean and a professor of economics at the London Business School; member of The Trilateral Commission

== Spain ==
- César Alierta (2010, 2016), chairman and CEO of Telefónica
- Juan Luis Cebrián (2008–2012, 2016, 2017–2018), executive chairman, PRISA and El País
- José Manuel Entrecanales (2009, 2010), chairman of Acciona
- Jaime Carvajal, 5th Marquess of Isasi (2010), chairman of Advent International
- Luis Garicano (2016), professor of Economics, LSE; senior advisor to Ciudadanos
- Javier Monzón (2019), chairman, PRISA

== Sweden ==
- Marcus Wallenberg Jr. (1957, 1958, 1962, 1963, 1964, 1965, 1966, 1967, 1969, 1970, 1971, 1972, 1973, 1974, 1975, 1976, 1977, 1978, 1979, 1980, 1981)
- Peter Wallenberg Sr. (1984, 1987)
- Marcus Wallenberg (1996, 1997, 2001, 2009, 2014, 2017, 2018, 2019)
- Percy Barnevik (1992–1996, 1997, 2001), former CEO of ASEA
- Daniel Ek (2024), CEO, Spotify
- Conni Jonsson (2016), Founder and chairman, EQT AB
- Lars Renström (2010), President and CEO of Alfa Laval
- Hans Stråberg (2006), CEO of Electrolux
- Jacob Wallenberg (2000–2016), chairman of Investor AB

== Switzerland ==
=== Business leaders ===
- Peter Brabeck-Letmathe (2011), chairman of Nestlé
- André Kudelski (2011, 2016), chairman and CEO, Kudelski Group
- Daniel Vasella (2008–2013), chairman of Novartis
- Peter Voser (2010, 2013), chairman of ABB and former CEO of Royal Dutch Shell

=== Journalists and media figures ===
- Michael Ringier (2009), chairman of Ringier
- Pietro Supino (2012), chairman of Tamedia

=== Academics and public intellectuals ===
- Beatrice Weder di Mauro (2016), professor of Economics, University of Mainz

== Turkey ==
=== Business leaders ===
- Ümit Boyner (2007), vice-president, Turkish Industry and Business Association (TÜSİAD)
- Süreyya Ciliv (2011), CEO, Turkcell
- Levent Çakıroğlu (2017), CEO, Koç Holding
- Muhtar Kent (2007), CEO, The Coca-Cola Company
- Ali Koç (2026), vice-president, Koç Holding
- Mustafa Koç (2008–2013), chairman, Koç Holding
- Ömer M. Koç (2017–2019, 2023, 2024), chairman, Koç Holding
- Tuncay Özilhan (2010), chairman of Anadolu Group
- Murat Özyeğin (2025, 2026), chairman, Fiba Group
- Şefika Pekin (2011), partner, Pekin Bayar Mizrahi (Attorneys-at-Law)
- Mehmet Tara (2026), chairman, ENKA
- Serpil Timuray (2012), CEO, Vodafone Turkey
- Agah Uğur (2009), CEO, Borusan Holding
- Arzuhan Doğan Yalçındağ (2007), president, Turkish Industry and Business Association (TÜSİAD)
- Erkut Yücaoğlu (2007), chairman, MAP/TURKUAZ Group

=== Academics and public intellectuals ===
- Mustafa Akyol (2017), senior visiting fellow, Freedom Project at Wellesley College
- Mustafa Aydın (2024), professor of international relations, Kadir Has University
- Senem Aydın-Düzgit (2016), associate professor and Jean Monnet Chair, Istanbul Bilgi University
- Evren Balta (2019), associate professor of Political Science, Özyeğin University
- Mehmet Fatih Ceylan (2023), president, Ankara Policy Center
- Canan Dağdeviren (2018), assistant professor, MIT Media Lab
- Selva Demiralp (2019), professor of economics, Koç University
- Kemal Derviş (2002, 2004, 2006, 2007), Head, United Nations Development Programme (UNDP)
- Emre Erdoğan (2024), professor of political science, Istanbul Bilgi University
- Refet Gürkaynak (2023), professor of economics, Bilkent University
- Şebnem Kalemli-Özcan (2024), Schreiber Family Professor of Economics, Brown University
- Fuat Keyman (2012), director, Istanbul Policy Center, Sabancı University
- Soli Özel (2015, 2016, 2023), lecturer, Koç University
- Behlül Özkan (2018), associate professor in international relations, Marmara University
- Feridun Sinirlioğlu (2026), Secretary-General, Organization for Security and Co-operation in Europe (OSCE)
- Metin Sitti (2019), professor, Koç University; director, Max Planck Institute for Intelligent Systems
- Ayşe Soysal (2007), rector, Boğaziçi University
- Sinan Ülgen (2017), founding partner, Centre for Economics and Foreign Policy Studies (EDAM)
- Ahmet Üzümcü (2015), Director-General, Organisation for the Prohibition of Chemical Weapons (OPCW)
- Ayşe Zarakol (2026), professor, University of Cambridge's Department of Politics and International Studies

=== Journalists and media figures ===
- Mehmet Ali Birand (2007), journalist
- Enis Berberoğlu (2012), editor-in-chief, Hürriyet
- Cansu Çamlıbel (2017), Washington DC Bureau Chief, Hürriyet
- Cengiz Çandar (2007), journalist
- Kadri Gürsel (2024), journalist, Medyascope
- Sami Kohen (2009), Senior Foreign Affairs Columnist, Milliyet
- Nuray Mert (2015), journalist
- Murat Yetkin (2018), editor-in-chief, Hürriyet Daily News
- Barçın Yinanç (2023), journalist, T24

== United Kingdom ==
=== Business leaders ===
- Marcus Agius, (2011, 2013, 2016), chairman, PA Consulting Group
- Lord Browne of Madingley (1995, 1997, 2004), chief executive of BP
- Robert Dudley (2016), group chief executive, BP
- Dido Harding (2016), CEO, TalkTalk Group
- Demis Hassabis (2016, 2022, 2023, 2024), CEO and founder, DeepMind
- John Sawers (2016), chairman and partner, Macro Advisory Partners
- Mustafa Suleyman (2022, 2024), CEO, Microsoft AI; co-founder and former CEO, Inflection AI; venture partner at Greylock Partners
- Martin Taylor (1993–1996, 1997, 2013), former CEO of Barclays
- Emma Walmsley (2022), CEO, GlaxoSmithKline plc

=== Journalists and media figures ===
- Zanny Minton Beddoes (2016, 2022, 2023, 2024), editor-in-chief, The Economist
- Will Hutton (1997), former CEO of The Work Foundation and editor-in-chief of The Observer
- Shashank Joshi (2022, 2023), defence editor, The Economist
- Andrew Knight (1996), journalist, editor, and media baron

=== Academics and public intellectuals ===
- Guy Standing (2016), co-president, BIEN; research professor, University of London

== United States ==
=== Business leaders ===
- Sam Altman (2016, 2022, 2023) president, Y Combinator;co-chairman of OpenAI
- Dario Amodei (2024), co-founder and CEO, Anthropic
- Jeff Bezos (2011, 2013), founder and CEO of Amazon
- Albert Bourla (2022, 2023, 2024) chairman and CEO, Pfizer
- Timothy C. Collins (2008–2012), CEO of Ripplewood Holdings
- David M. Cote (2016), chairman and CEO, Honeywell
- Roger W. Ferguson, Jr. (2016), president and CEO, TIAA
- Bill Gates (2010, 2012), chairman of Microsoft
- Steve Ballmer (2003, 2012, 2015), former CEO of Microsoft
- Louis V. Gerstner, Jr., former CEO of IBM
- Donald E. Graham (2008–2010), CEO and chairman of The Washington Post Company, board of directors for Facebook
- Kenneth C. Griffin (2023), founder and CEO, Citadel LLC
- H. J. Heinz II (1954), CEO of Heinz (deceased)
- Mary Kay Henry (2022), international president of Service Employees International Union
- Mellody Hobson (2016, 2022), president, Ariel Investments, chairwoman of Starbucks
- Reid Hoffman (2016, 2019, 2022), co-founder and executive chairman, LinkedIn, partner at Greylock Partners
- Chris Hughes (2011), Co-founder of Facebook
- Kenneth M. Jacobs (2016), chairman and CEO, Lazard
- James A. Johnson (2016), chairman, Johnson Capital Partners
- Vernon Jordan (2016), senior managing director, Lazard Frères & Co
- Alex Karp (2016, 2022, 2023, 2024) CEO, Palantir Technologies
- Klaus Kleinfeld (2016), chairman and CEO, Alcoa
- Henry Kravis (2008–2016, 2022), co-founder, co-chairman, and co-CEO of KKR
- Richard Levin (2016), CEO, Coursera
- Divesh Makan (2016), CEO, ICONIQ Capital
- Scott Malcomson (2016), author; president, Monere Ltd.
- Craig Mundie (2016, 2022, 2023), principal, Mundie & Associates
- Satya Nadella (2019), CEO of Microsoft
- Eric Schmidt (2008, 2010, 2011, 2013, 2014, 2015, 2016, 2019, 2022, 2023, 2024), executive chairman of Alphabet; former CEO and chair, Google
- Kevin Scott (2022), CTO, Microsoft Corporation
- Peter Thiel (2007–2016, 2019, 2022, 2023, 2024), president, Thiel Capital LLC; president of Clarium Capital; co-founder of PayPal

=== Journalists and media figures ===
- Fouad Ajami (2012), senior fellow, the Hoover Institution, Stanford University
- Anne Applebaum (2016, 2022, 2023, 2024) staff writer, The Atlantic; columnist, Washington Post; director of the Transitions Forum, Legatum Institute
- William F. Buckley Jr. (1996), columnist and founder of National Review
- Richard Engel (2016), chief foreign correspondent, NBC News
- Megan McArdle (2016), columnist, Bloomberg View
- John Micklethwait (2016), editor-in-chief, Bloomberg L.P.
- Peggy Noonan (2016), author, columnist, The Wall Street Journal
- Charlie Rose (2008, 2010, 2011, 2012), executive editor and anchor, Charlie Rose
- George Stephanopoulos (1996, 1997), former Communications Director of the Clinton Administration (1993–1996), now ABC News Chief Washington Correspondent
- Bret Stephens (2024), opinion columnist, New York Times
- Fareed Zakaria (2024), CNN host, Fareed Zakaria GPS

=== Academics and public intellectuals ===
- William C. Dudley (2022), senior research scholar, Princeton University
- Niall Ferguson (2016), professor of History, Harvard University
- Garry Kasparov (2023), chair, Renew Democracy Initiative; former World Chess Champion (1985–2000)
- Stephen Kotkin (2023, 2024), senior fellow, Hoover Institution, Stanford University; professor emeritus in History and International Affairs, Stanford University
- Marie-Josée Kravis (2016, 2022), senior fellow, Hudson Institute, chair, Museum of Modern Art
- Yann LeCun (2022), Silver Professor of the Courant Institute of Mathematical Sciences
- Charles A. Murray (2016), W.H. Brady Scholar, American Enterprise Institute
- Richard Pipes (1981), senior staff member, National Security Council
- Matthew Pottinger (2023), distinguished visiting fellow, Hoover Institution; former Principal Deputy National Security Advisor (2019–2021)
- Nadia Schadlow (2022, 2023, 2024), senior fellow, Hudson Institute; Deputy National Security Advisor for Strategy (2018); staff appointee to the National Security Council (2017–2018)
- Ashley J. Tellis (2022, 2023), Tata Chair for Strategic Affairs, Carnegie Endowment for International Peace

== Venezuela ==
- Gustavo Cisneros (2010), chairman of Grupo Cisneros

== See also ==
- List of Bilderberg meetings
