= Matthias Joseph de Noël =

German merchant, painter, art collector and writer

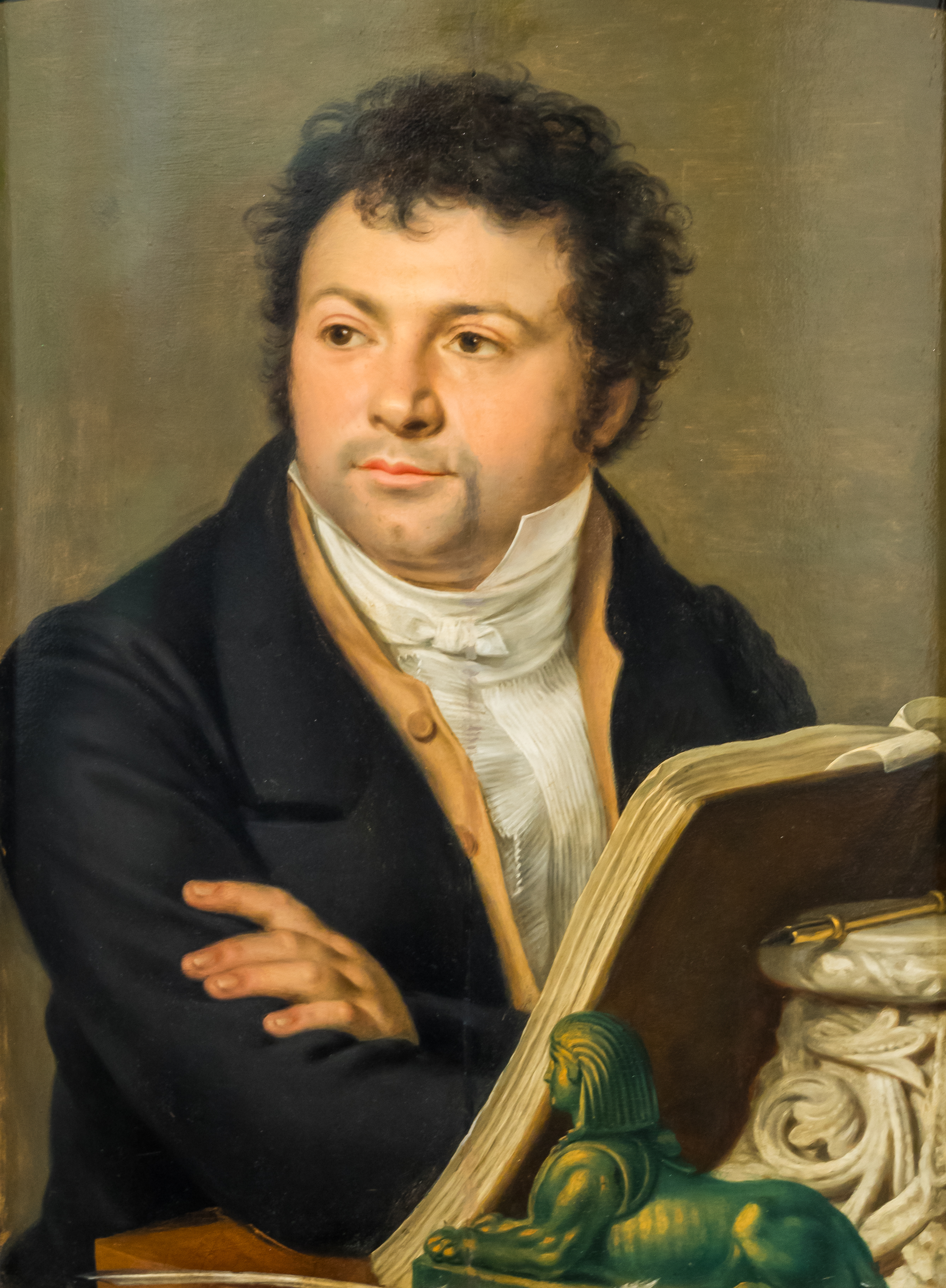
Matthias Joseph de Noël

Matthias Joseph de Noël (28 December 1782 – 18 November 1849) was a German merchant, painter, art collector and writer.

== Life ==
Born in Cologne, de Noël learned drawing after a commercial apprenticeship in his home town with Egidius Mengelberg and Caspar Arnold Grein, as well as oil painting with Benedikt Beckenkamp. After this training, he spent longer periods in Rome and Paris to devote himself entirely to painting. After his father's death, de Noël returned to Cologne to continue his parents' business.

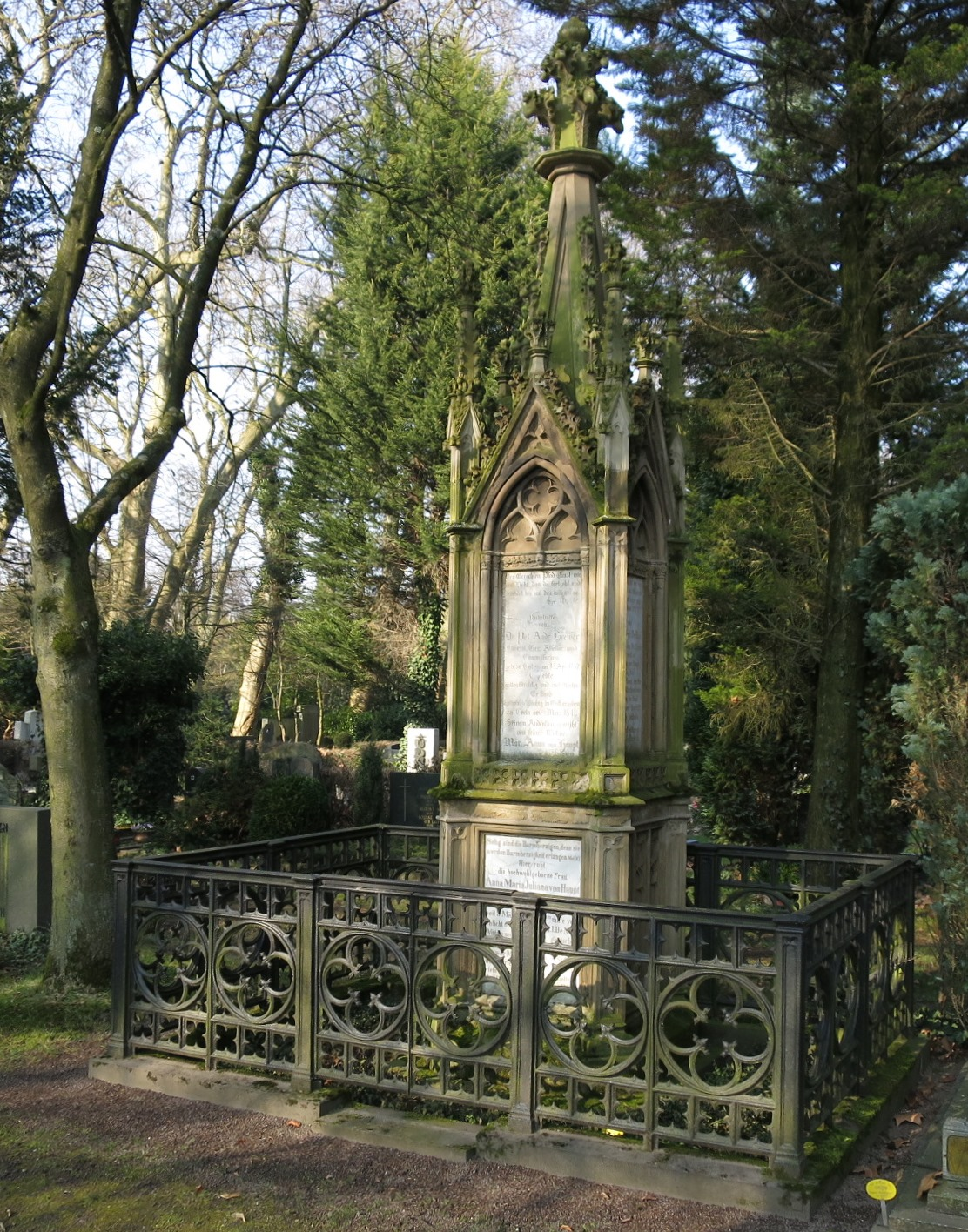
His grave

In 1828, de Noël became curator of Cologne's first municipal museum, the Wallrafianum, later Cologne's Wallraf-Richartz-Museum. There he took over from the curator Johann Jakob Peter Fuchs the care of the legacy of his friend Ferdinand Franz Wallraf bequeathed to the city of Cologne. His own extensive art collection later became the foundation of the Cologne Kunstgewerbemuseums.

As a writer, he contributed to the renewal of the Cologne Carnival. In addition, he is one of three authors responsible for the art-historical part of the first Cologne city guide from 1828.

de Noël died in Cologne at the age of 66 and was buried in Cologne at the Melaten cemetery (lit. D).

== Work ==
- Der Dom zu Köln. Historisch-archäologische Beschreibung. 2nd enlarged edition. DuMont-Schauberg, Cologne 1837 (Numerized)
- Ausgewählte Gedichte. In Hermann Marggraff: Hausschatz der deutschen Humoristik. E. Wengler, Leipzig 1858, pp. 244–253 (Numerized)

== See also ==
- Bernhards Versuchung durch das Mädchen, Scheibe aus der Sammlung de Noël im Museum Schnütgen (Cologne)
- Bernhard gewinnt adelige Turniergäste, leadlight from the de Noël collection at the Museum Schnütgen
