= Johann Heinrich Richartz =

German merchant

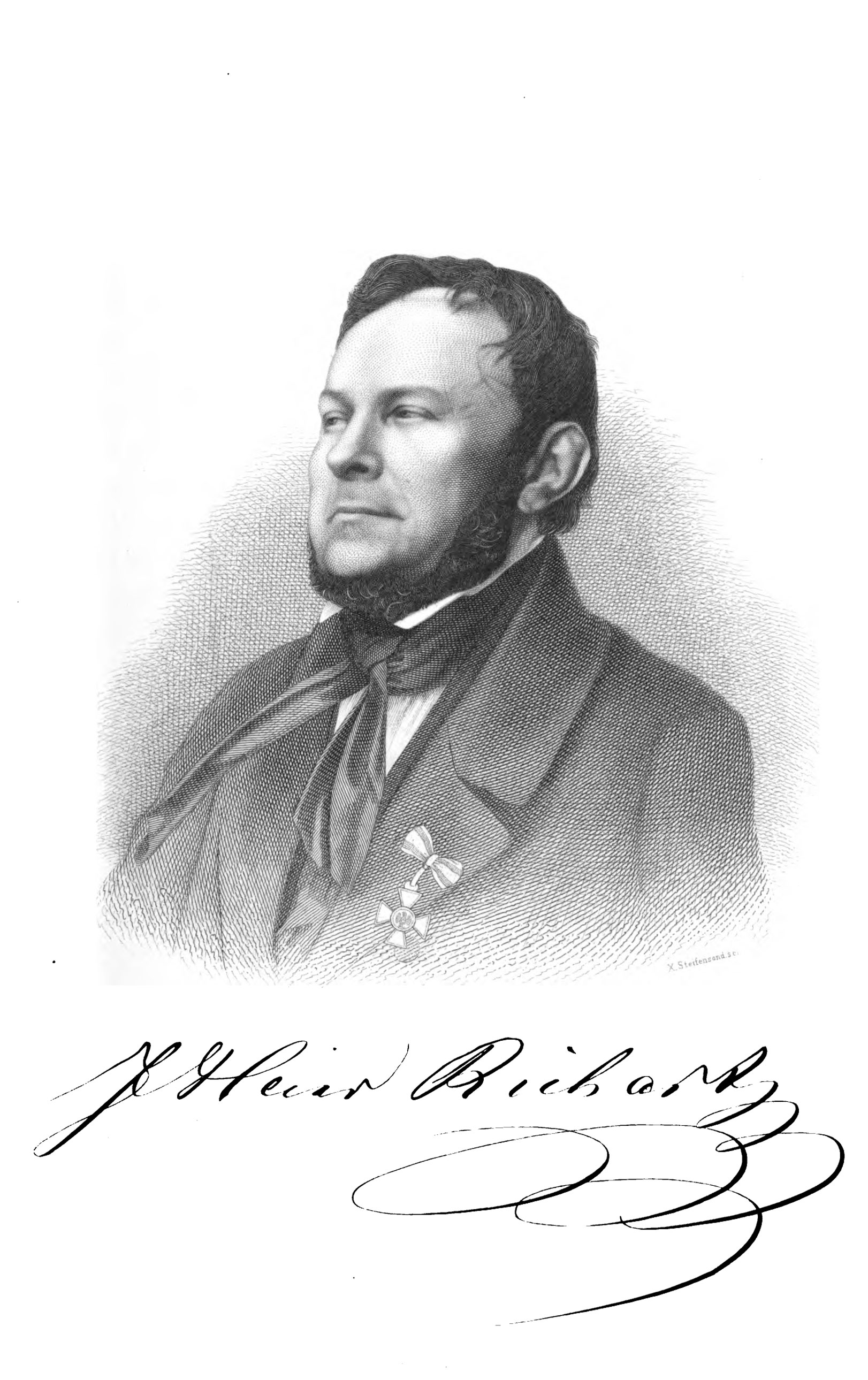
Johann Heinrich Richartz

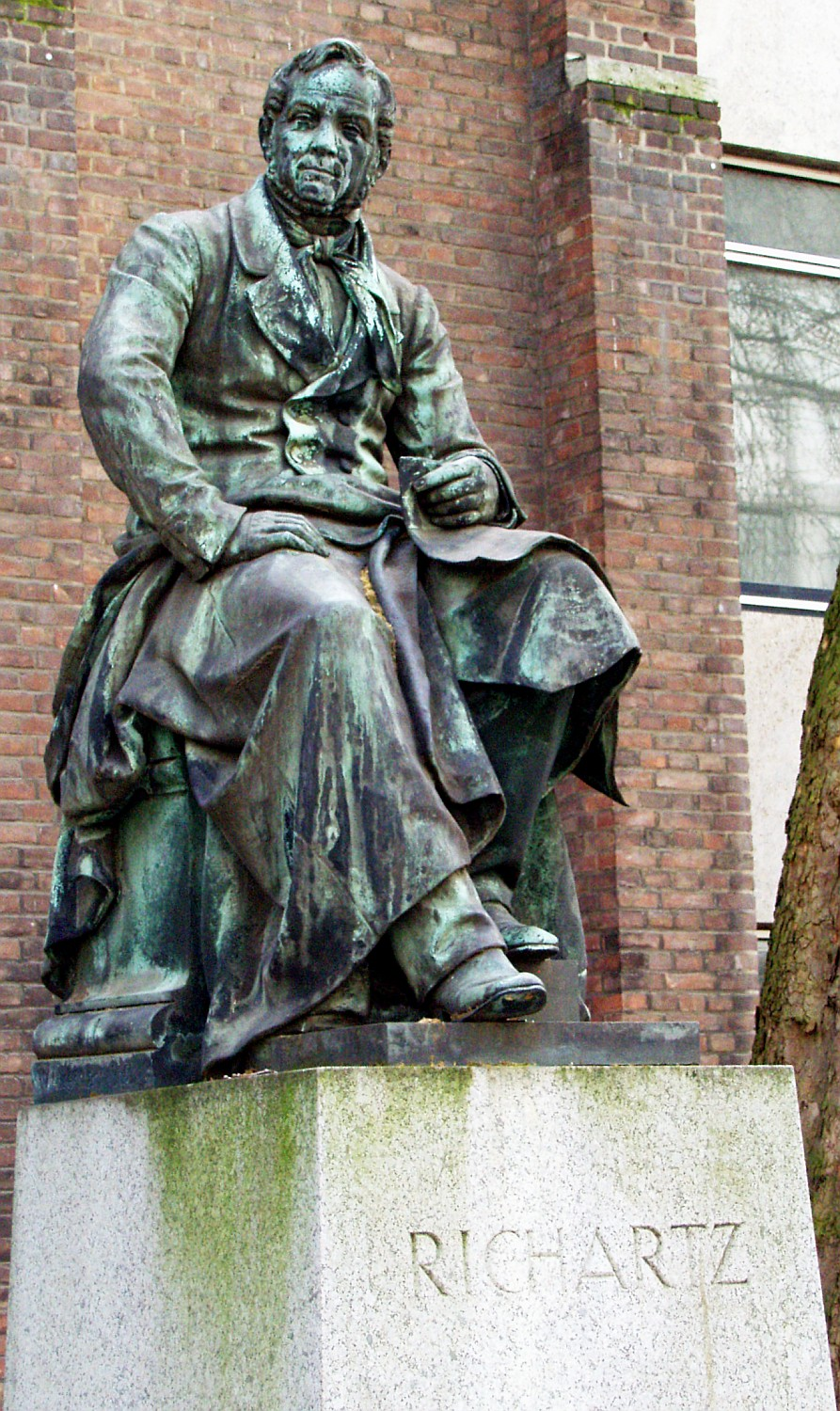
Alberman's statue

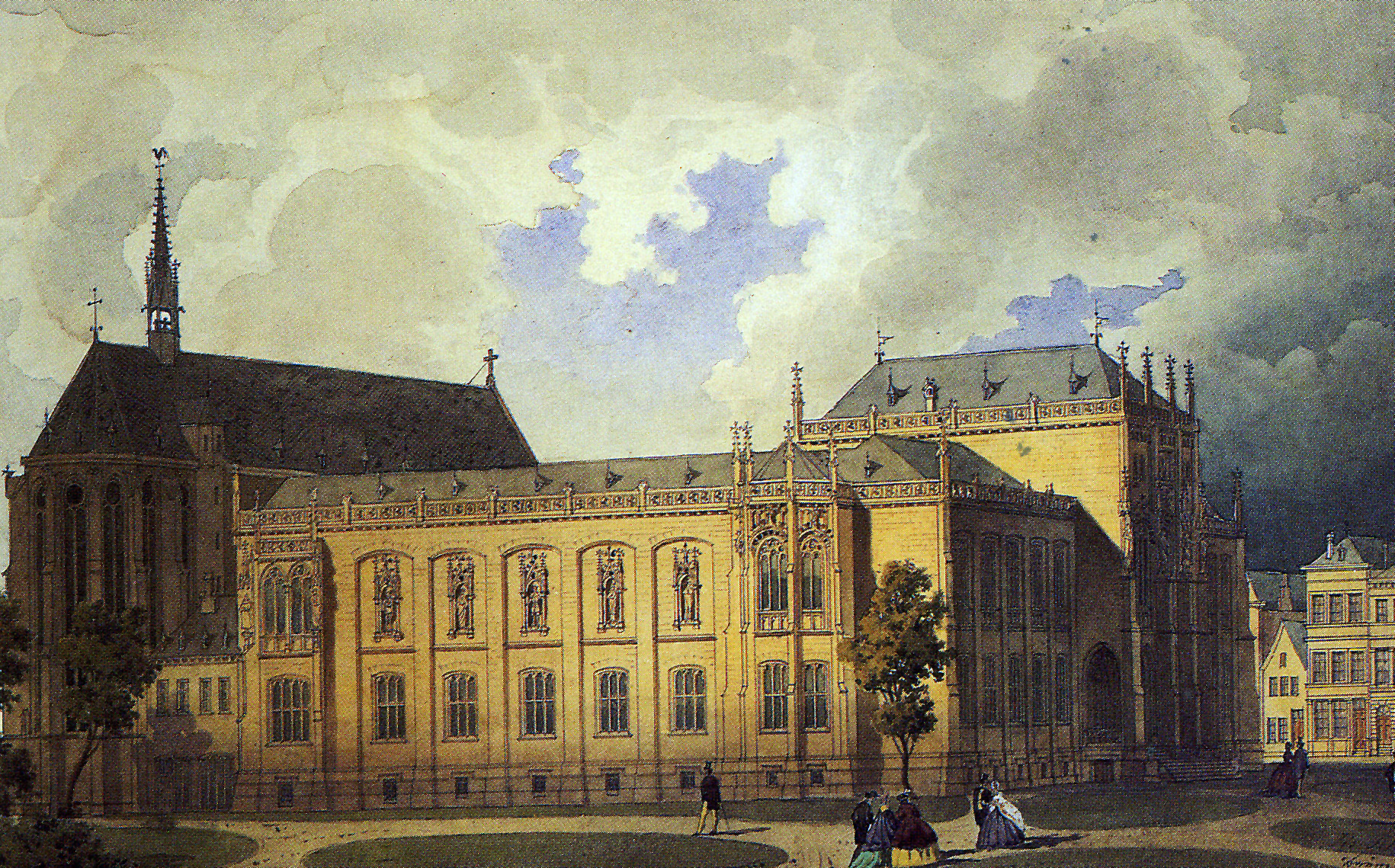
Watercolour of the Wallraf-Richartz-Museum in its opening year, 1861 (Kölnisches Stadtmuseum)

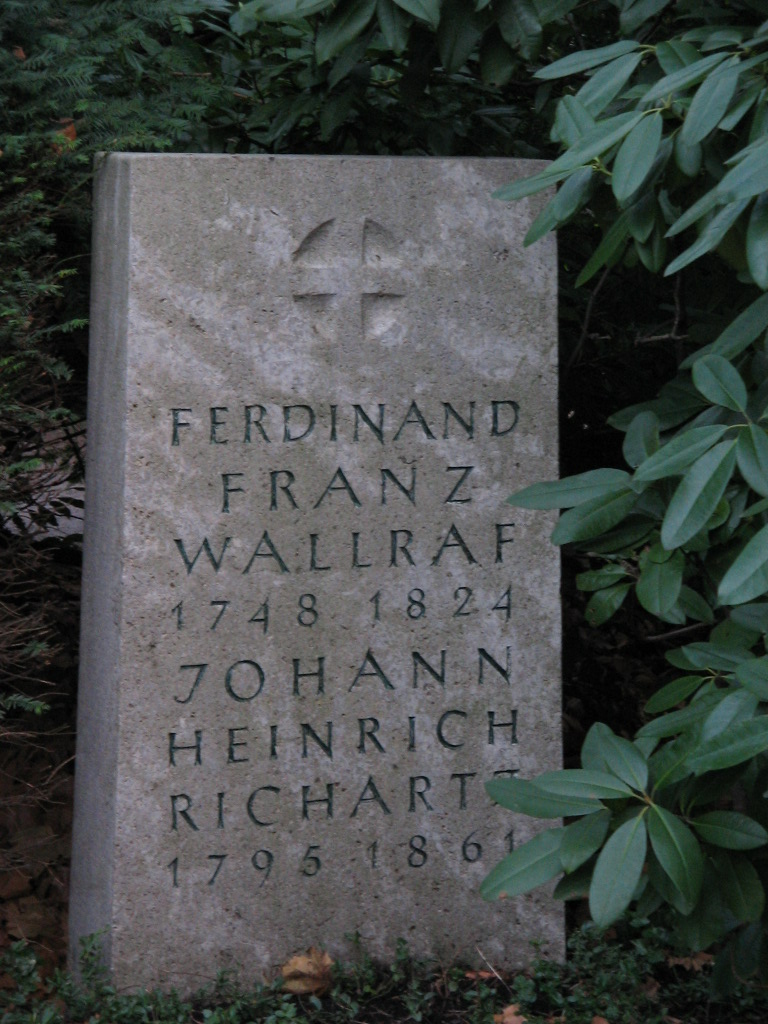
Wallraf and Richartz's joint gravestone

Johann Heinrich Richartz (15 May 1796 – 22 April 1861) was a German businessman and patron of the arts, best known as the main funder of the Wallraf-Richartz-Museum.

== Life ==
=== Business ===
Johann Heinrich Richartz took over his father's business in the leather and wild hide trade after completing an apprenticeship in Mainz, Brussels, and Antwerp. He expanded business relations with North and South America to the point that the Cologne branch of J.H. Richartz & Co. was in competition with the main trade offices in Antwerp. Richartz retired in 1851 as a "simple, sober and unpretentious" citizen.

=== Museum patronage ===
At a meeting of the City Council of Cologne on May 3, 1854, it became known that Richartz offered "to pay the construction costs of a new municipal museum at the beginning of next year to the city treasury the sum of one hundred thousand thalers (German Silver Coin) against one deposit the annual pension of four out of a hundred." The aim of the foundation was to include the art collection of the collector Ferdinand Franz Wallraf, which he had left to the city in 1824, in the completed municipal museum. Further endowments followed, making the final total of his donations 277,000 thaler, more than half the museum's total construction costs. In recognition, Frederick William IV of Prussia made him a royal Kommerzienrat and a member of the Order of the Red Eagle 3rd class, and in June 1857 the Universal Society for the Encouragement of Arts and Industry awarded him a gold medal. He was also made an honorary member of the Academy of Arts.

Richartz died in Cologne after a brief illness shortly before the building's completion. The building was named after Richartz's and Wallraf at its opening in 1861. His will left another 100,000 thaler to fund a lunatic asylum on the condition that the interest for the next ten years was used as an acquisition fund for the new museum. He also left 9,000 thaler to expand the Minoritenkirche next door to the museum, 2,500 thaler to Cologne Cathedral, and 2,000 thaler to fund a charity place at the Rheinischen Musikschule. Like Wallraf, he was buried in the Melaten-Friedhof. On 10 April 1900, a bronze statue of Richartz by Wilhelm Albermann was unveiled outside the Wallraf-Richartz-Museum's original site (now the Museum for Applied Arts). That site was on a street between Wallraf-Platz and Minoritenstrasse, now known as the Richartzstraße. Richartz's home on the Blaubach is marked by a bronze memorial tablet.

== Awards and honors ==
In 1860, Richartz was appointed Honorary Member of the Royal Academy of Arts in Berlin.
