= Kunstgewerbemuseum =

Kunstgewerbemuseum (Decorative Art Museum) may refer to:

- Kunstgewerbemuseum Berlin, founded 1868
- Kunstgewerbemuseum Dresden
- Museum für Kunst und Gewerbe Hamburg, founded 1874
- Museum für Angewandte Kunst (Cologne), known as the Kunstgewerbemuseum 1900-1987
- Museum of Design, Zürich, founded 1875 as the Kunstgewerbemuseum der Stadt Zürich
