= Franz Clouth =

German pioneer in rubber processing

Franz Julius Albertus Clouth (born December 18, 1838, in Cologne; died about September 7, 1910) was a German pioneer in rubber processing.

Franz Clouth was the son of Wilhelm Clouth (1807–1871), a printer, and his wife Anna Maria Katharina, née Ritter. After a commercial apprenticeship in Germany, Great Britain and Belgium, he worked as a rubber goods representative in Cologne's Sternengasse. His company logo corresponded to the house mark of the building there, a star with five points.

From 1868, he produced rubber goods in his own company, Clouth Gummiwerke AG, in Cologne-Nippes. He was one of the first manufacturers to process the raw material gutta-percha. Until 1879, Clouth lived at Sternengasse 3, from where he rode daily on horseback to Nippes. In 1879 he moved to Nippes, first in Florastrasse (later the registry office), then in a villa directly next to the factory on Niehler Strasse in 1883. He married Josefine Baum (1847–1920), and their daughter Rose Clouth was born in 1876.

The company collaborated with the cable manufacturer Felten & Guilleaume. Clouth was involved in the founding of several companies for the production of submarine cables. The company also supplied the covering material for Ferdinand Graf von Zeppelin's LZ 1 airship in 1899. The company owner Clouth, an aviation enthusiast, had balloons built in a specially constructed balloon hangar, and finally constructed his own airship in 1909.

From 1901, the company operated under the name Rheinische Gummiwarenfabrik Franz Clouth.

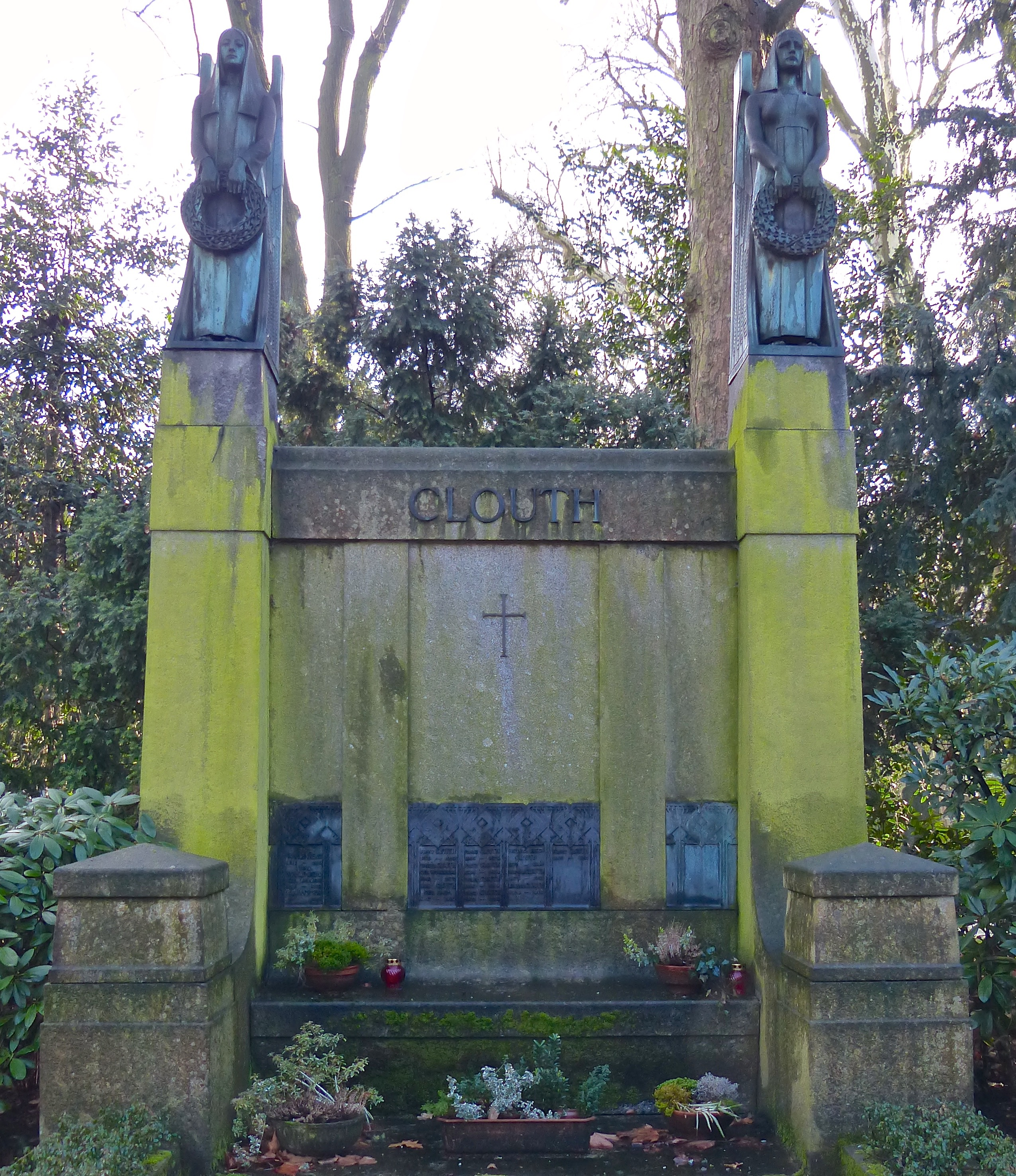
Tomb of Franz Clouth in Melaten-Friedhof (MA between HWG und Lit. G)

Franz Clouth also engaged in research on rubber processing and storage. He was a municipal politician in Cologne-Longerich and Cologne-Nippes.

He died unexpectedly in his factory villa on September 7, 1910, and was buried in Melaten Cemetery (Millionenallee). The Clouth family grave was designed by Rudolf Bosselt in 1904. His wife Josefine Clouth took over the management of the company in 1910, the year of his death. Today, the entrepreneur is commemorated by Franz-Clouth-Strasse in Cologne-Nippes, which was named after him in 1915. The company Clouth Gummiwerke was merged with its parent company Continental AG in January 1997 due to losses, which ended the worldwide known company.

== Origin of the name ==
Even if the name Clouth seems French or Huguenot, it originates, like the family, from the Westerwald. Johannes Clouth, an ancestor of Franz Clouth was already resident in Cologne in 1670. In the Lower Rhine region the word "Clouth" or "Clut" means as much as ball, which has been preserved until today in the word "Klütten" as the name for lignite briquettes.

== Literature ==
- Manfred Backhausen: Die Franz Clouth Rheinische Gummiwarenfabrik A.G. und die Land- und Seekabelwerke A.G. In: Pulheimer Beiträge zur Geschichte, 27 (2003), S. 142–170
- Wolfgang Beier: Made in Kölle – Clouth und die Luftschifffahrt. Kölsche Luftfahrt- und Industriegeschichte der Rheinischen Gummiwarenfabrik Franz Clouth; Köln, 2009
- Franz Brill (1957). "Clouth, Franz Julius Hubert". Neue Deutsche Biographie (in German). Vol. 3. Berlin: Duncker & Humblot. pp. 295–295. (full text online).
- Franz Clouth: Gummi, Guttapercha und Balata: ihr Ursprung und Vorkommen, ihre Gewinnung, Verarbeitung und Verwertung; Leipzig, 1899
- Franz Clouth Rheinische Gummiwarenfabrik (Hrsg.): Festschrift zum 75-jährigen Bestehen der Firma Franz Clouth Rheinische Gummiwarenfabrik AG Köln-Nippes: 1862–1937; Köln, 1937
- Franz Clouth Rheinische Gummiwarenfabrik (Hrsg.): 90 Jahre Franz Clouth Rheinische Gummiwarenfabrik Aktiengesellschaft Köln-Nippes: 1862–1952; Köln, 1952
- Franz Clouth Rheinische Gummiwarenfabrik (Hrsg.): 100 Jahre "Wagnis Arbeit Erfolg" 1862–1962; Köln 1962
- Horst A. Wessel: Franz Clouth (1838 bis 1910). In: Kölner Unternehmer im 19. und 20. Jahrhundert. (Rheinisch-Westfälische Wirtschaftsbiographien, Band 13.) Aschendorff, Münster 1986, S. 113–130.
- Fritz Zilcken: Franz Clouth, Rheinische Gummiwaarenfabrik m.b.H., Cöln-Nippes. Denkschrift zum 50-jährigen Bestehen der Firma. 1862–1912; Köln, 1912
