= Wilhelm Albermann =

German sculptor (1835–1913)

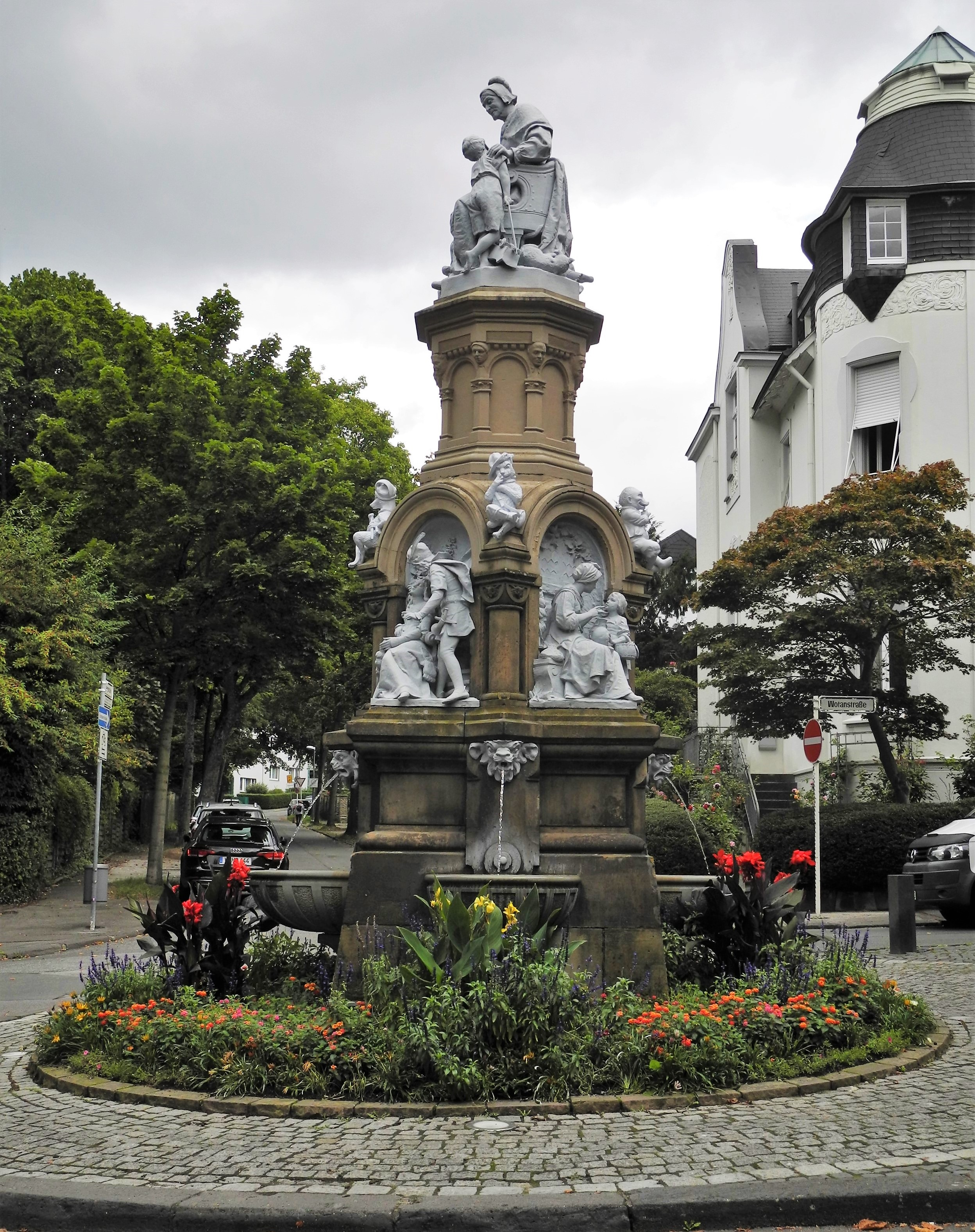
The Märchenbrunnen (Fairy Tale Fountain), in Wuppertal

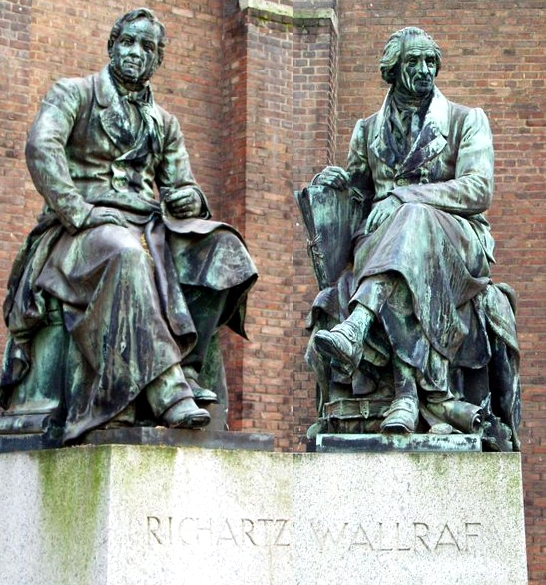
The statues of Richartz and Wallraf at MAK (photomontage)

Johann Friedrich Wilhelm Albermann (28 May 1835, Werden an der Ruhr – 9 August 1913, Cologne) was a German sculptor.

== Life and work ==
His father was a cabinet maker. He attended the Rektoratsschule in Werden until he was sixteen, then served an apprenticeship as a wood sculptor, in Elberfeld. In 1855, he was drafted into the military and served with the 2nd Grenadier Regiment in Berlin. His Company Commander recognized his artistic talent, and allowed him to attend the Prussian Academy of Art while on duty. During this time, he joined the "Catholic Reading Association", the first student corporation in the Kartellverband.

After his discharge from the army, he initially worked for his former teachers, Hugo Hagen and August Fischer. In 1864, he found himself back in the army, during the Second Schleswig War. The following year, he settled in Cologne. There, he became a free-lance sculptor. At the suggestion of the regional government, he founded a commercial drawing school in 1871, where he taught and served as Director until 1896. From 1893 to 1900, he was a Stadtverordneter (City Councilor). He was named a Professor in 1902.

His sculptural work was very extensive. Among his best known works are the statues of Ferdinand Franz Wallraf and Johann Heinrich Richartz, in front of the Museum für Angewandte Kunst, which they founded. Other notable works include the Johann von Werth Fountain, at the Alter Markt, the Hermann Josef Fountain, at the Waidmarkt, and the Märchenbrunnen in Wuppertal; done in a similar configurations. He also created numerous architectural sculptures, for private as well as public structures, and religious figures for various churches.

He was interred at Melaten Cemetery, where twenty of the graves are adorned with his works.

== Sources ==
- Erwin Dickhoff: Essener Köpfe. Wer war was? Richard Bracht, Essen 1985, pg.3, ISBN 3-87034-037-1
- Werner Schmidt: Der Bildhauer Wilhelm Albermann. Leben und Werk, Kölnisches Stadtmuseum, 2001, ISBN 3-927396-85-0
- Siegfried Koß: "Albermann, Wilhelm", in: Wolfgang Löhr (Ed.): Biographisches Lexikon des KV. 2. Teil, (Revocatio historiae Vol.3), SH-Verlag, Schernfeld 1993, pg.15 f. ISBN 3-923621-98-1
- P. Höveler: "Professor Wilhelm Albermann", in: Akademische Monatsblätter, 1914
- E. Trier, W. Weyres (Eds.): Kunst des 19. Jahrhunderts im Rheinland, Vol.IV. Schwann, Düsseldorf 1980, ISBN 3-590-30254-2
- Paul Kühn, "Albermann, Wilhelm", in: Allgemeines Lexikon der Bildenden Künstler von der Antike bis zur Gegenwart, Vol. 1: Aa–Antonio de Miraguel, Wilhelm Engelmann, Leipzig, 1907 pgs.184–185 (Online)
