= Alfred Nourney =

German Titanic survivor (1892–1972)

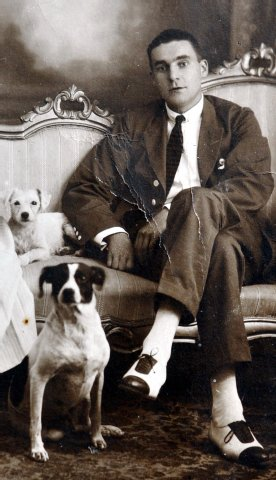
- Alfred Nourney and his pets, 1912
- Born: 26 February 1892; Nijmegen, Netherlands
- Died: 15 November 1972 (aged 80); Germany
- Other name: Baron Alfred von Drachstedt
- Known for: Titanic survivor

Alfred Nourney, also known as Baron Alfred von Drachstedt (26 February 1892 – 15 November 1972), was a German socialite who survived the sinking of the Titanic in April 1912. Nourney was 20 when he travelled on board as a first-class passenger. Born in the Netherlands, Nourney grew up and lived in Germany his whole life. His behaviour on board the Titanic and Lifeboat 7 were a subject of controversy.

== Titanic ==
Travelling under the false name and title of Baron Alfred von Drachstedt, Nourney boarded the Titanic in Cherbourg, France, as a second-class passenger. His request to a purser to be transferred to a first-class cabin was granted, largely because of his supposedly aristocratic status. He had purchased expensive items, including clothes, jewellery, walking sticks, two sets of toilet articles and a fountain pen, in order to support his pretence.

On the night of 14 April 1912, he was playing bridge with other men in the first-class smoking room. When Nourney first sensed a disturbance, he briefly left to investigate, but returned to continue playing. Minutes later, they became aware of the situation and boarded Lifeboat #7 without difficulties, lowering away at 12:45 am. While the others were rowing, he sat motionless, smoking cigarettes. He also carried a pistol which he used to fire gunshots into the air through the night. They were rescued by the RMS Carpathia at 5:10 am.

While on board the Carpathia, he rested on a pile of blankets which were to be distributed among the survivors. A woman who entered the room pulled the uppermost blanket, making Nourney roll onto the floor. As everyone applauded the woman, he disappeared.

Upon disembarking on 18 April in New York City, he said he had lost all his money on the Titanic and wished to quickly return to Europe. He returned to France and then to Cologne, Germany, where his mother lived.

== Later life ==
During the 1920s, he was a salesman for Daimler-Benz AG, and he competed in motorsports. He settled in Bad Honnef, Germany, where he became an honour member of the "Rot-Weiss" Tennis Club. He married his second wife Irmgard Seiler in 1938 in Cologne, and had two daughters with her: Elke and Ute, who were born in 1940 and 1942, respectively. Prior to marrying Seiler, Nourney had been in a relationship with a woman named Paula, with whom he lived in Düsseldorf in the early 1930s. They remained childless and divorced after facing severe economic difficulties.

In 1954, Nourney gave an interview for the German television, where he said that crew members aboard Lifeboat 7 refused to return to pick up survivors, alleging that they could be swamped. Nourney also described the yelling of people in the water following the sinking as "sirens".

== Death ==
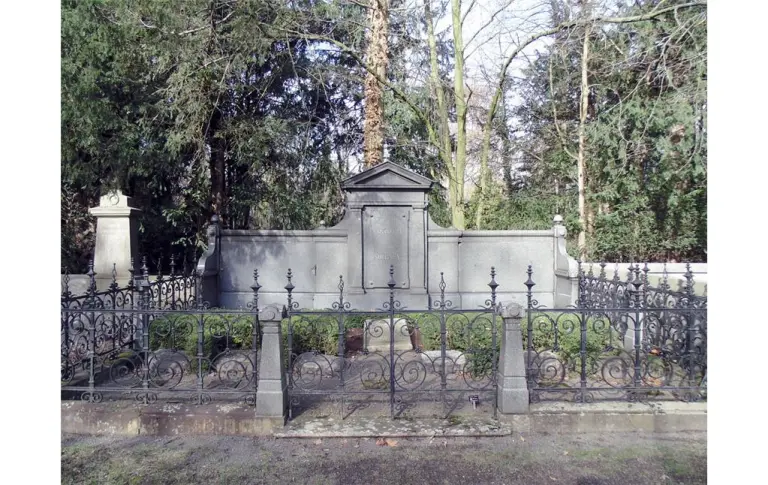
Nourney family crypt at Melaten cemetery in Cologne

Nourney died on 15 November 1972, and was, at the time of his death, the last remaining adult male survivor from the first class of the Titanic.

He was buried in the family's crypt at the Melaten cemetery in Cologne.
