= Melaten cemetery =

Cemetery in Cologne, Germany

Coordinates: 50°56′22″N 6°55′09″E

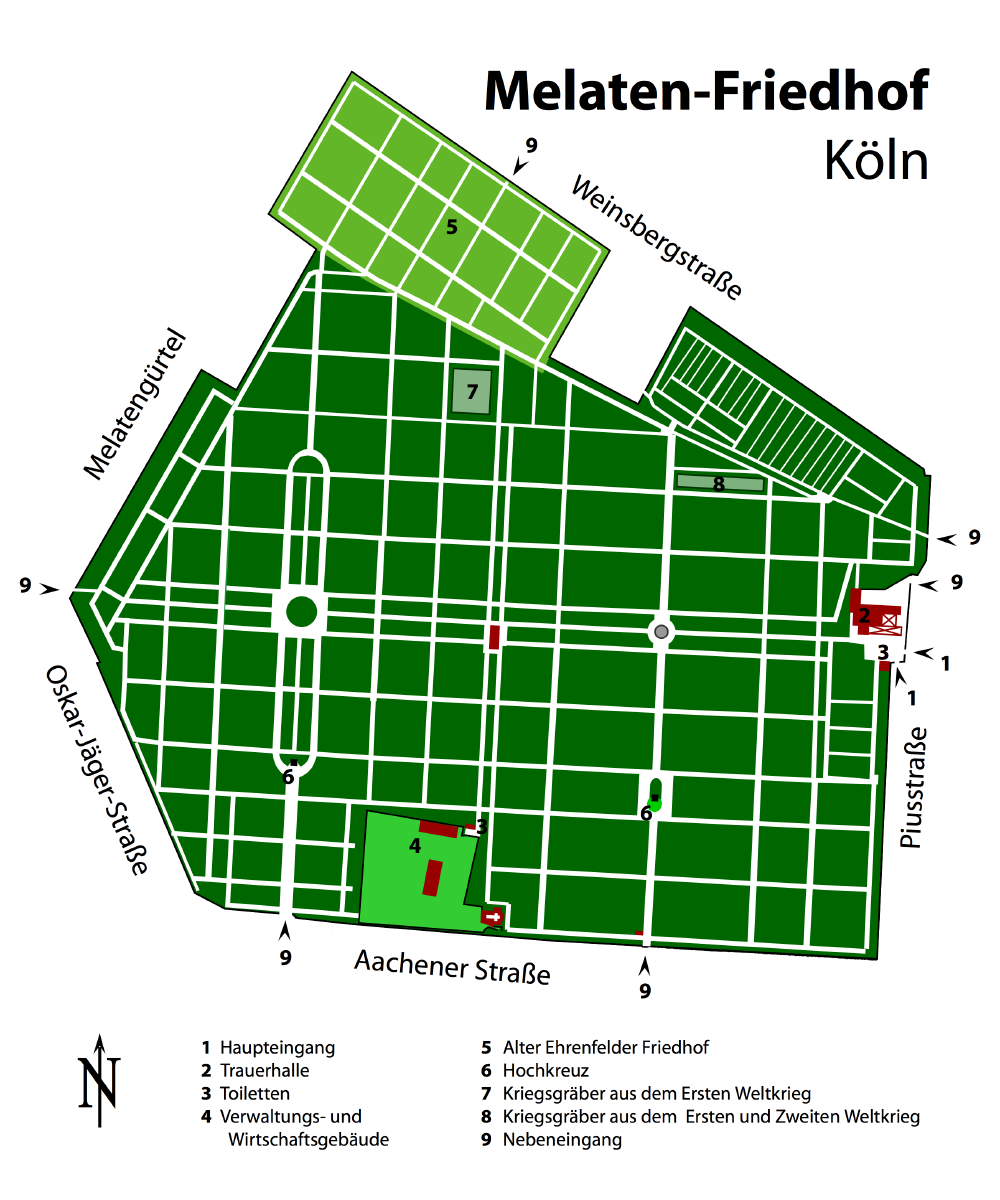
Plan of Melaten

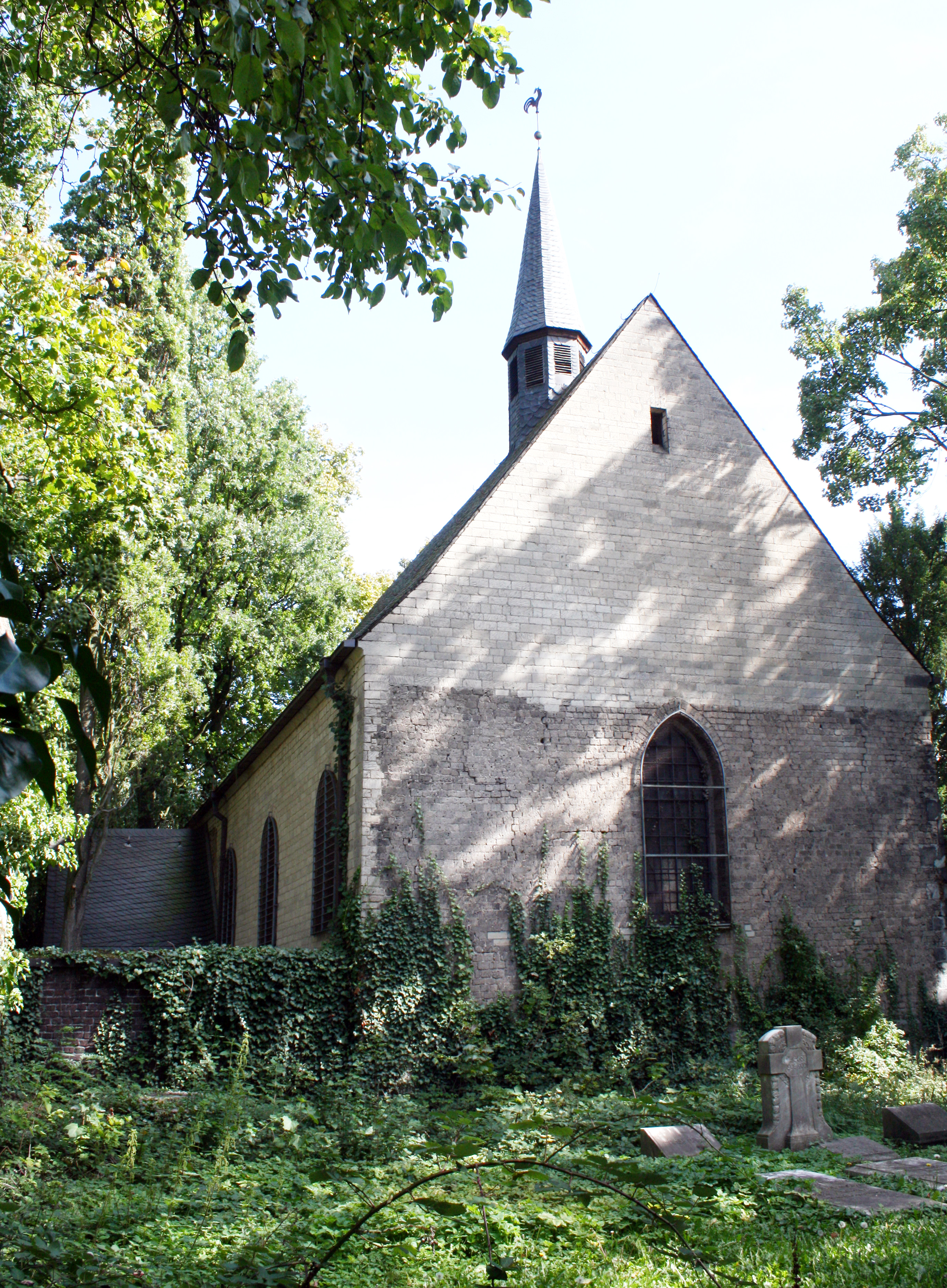
The cemetery's oldest chapel

Melaten is the central cemetery of Cologne, North Rhine-Westphalia, which was first mentioned in 1243. It was developed to a large park, holding the graves of notable residents.

== Name ==
The name "Melaten" refers to a hospital for the sick and lepers from the 12th century. The "hoff to Malaten" (modern German: Hof der Maladen, or "yard of the malades") is first mentioned in a 1243 document.

== Location ==
Melaten is in the north of the municipal district of Lindenthal. It is surrounded by streets, in the south Aachener Straße (Köln), in the east Piusstraße, in the west Oskar-Jäger-Straße and the Melatengürtel, and in the north Weinsbergstraße. The 435,000-square-metre cemetery had 55,540 graves in 2008, and is the largest cemetery in the city.

== History ==
Melaten is located approximately one kilometre west of the city district of Cologne, just beyond the Bischofsweg (Köln), the historical boundary between the territory of the city and that of the archbishop. The hospital therefore fell under the jurisdiction of the archbishop, and was in spiritual hands.

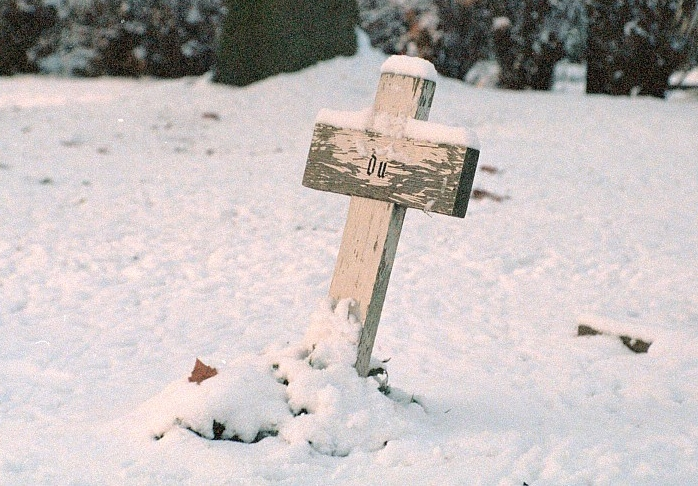
Wooden cross bearing only the inscription "Du" (You) on the children's graves field of Melaten Cemetery; disappeared by now

== Burials ==
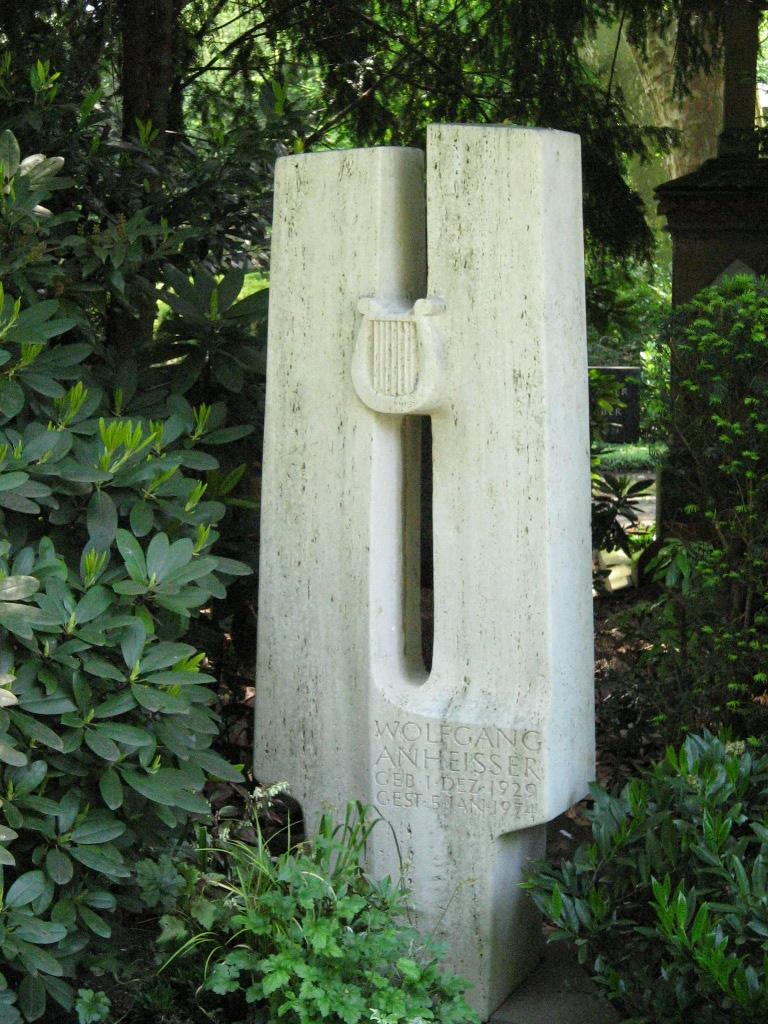
Grave of Wolfgang Anheisser

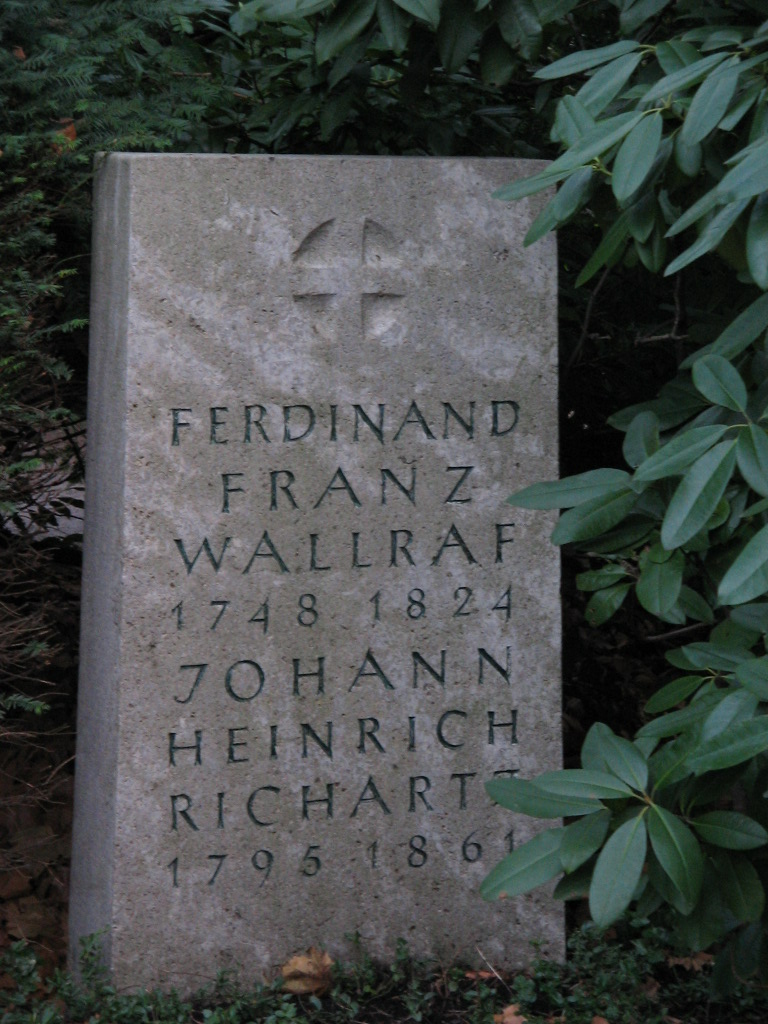
Grave stones of Wallraf and Richartz

Notable burials on Melaten include:

- Wilhelm Albermann (1835–1913), sculptor
- Wolfgang Anheisser (1929–1974), baritone
- Johannes Theodor Baargeld (1892–1927), artist
- Dirk Bach (1961–2012), actor, TV-presenter
- Wilhelm Backhaus (1884–1969), pianist
- Erika Berger (1939–2016), author
- Willy Birgel (1891–1973), actor
- Hans Böckler (1875–1951), politician and trade union leader
- Fritz Burgbacher (1900–1978), politician
- Claus Hinrich Casdorff (1925–2004), journalist
- Holger Czukay (1938–2017), avantgarde musician
- Wilhelm Ludwig Deichmann (1798–1876), banker
- Nevio De Zordo (1943–2014), Italian bobsledder
- de:Joseph DuMont (1811–1861), newspaper publisher
- de:Marcus DuMont (1784–1831), founder of de:Kölnische Zeitung
- Margot Eskens, singer, corridor Y (26).
- Jean Marie Farina (1809–1880), producer of Eau de Cologne
- Johann Maria Farina (1685–1766), founder of Eau de Cologne
- Ludwig Gies (1887–1966), sculptor
- Robert Görlinger (1888–1954), mayor 1948 to 1949
- Andreas Gottschalk (1815–1849), physician
- Hermann Grüneberg (1827–1894), chemist
- Alice Guszalewicz (1866–1940), opera singer
- Josef Haubrich (1889–1961), jurist, patron of the arts
- Ferdinand Hiller (1811–1885), composer
- Andreas Hillgruber (1925–1989), historian
- István Kertész (1929–1973), conductor
- Irmgard Keun (1905–1982), novelist
- Karel Krautgartner (1922–1982), jazz musician
- Hildegard Krekel (1952–2013), actress
- Eugen Langen (1833–1895), engineer
- Jaki Liebezeit (1938–2017), drummer
- Wilhelm Marx (1863–1946), chancellor
- Georg Meistermann (1911–1990), artist
- Gustav von Mevissen (1815–1899), entrepreneur
- Lucy Millowitsch (1905–1990), actress
- Willy Millowitsch (1909–1999), actor
- Wilhelm Mülhens (1762–1841), merchant
- Wolfgang Müller von Königswinter (1816–1873), poet
- Ernst Wilhelm Nay (1902–1968), artist
- Alfred Nourney (1892–1972), Titanic survivor
- Alfred Freiherr von Oppenheim (1934–2005), banker
- Nicolaus August Otto (1832–1891), inventor of the engine named after him
- Gunther Philipp (1918–2003), actor (Lit. D)
- Sigmar Polke (1941–2010), painter and photographer (Lit. D Nr. 28)
- Anton Räderscheidt (1892–1970), painter
- August Reichensperger (1808–1895), Jurist, politician and patron of the Cologne Cathedral
- Heinrich Reissdorf, brewery owner
- Fritz Rémond Jr. (1902–1976), actor and theatre manager
- Johann Heinrich Richartz (1796–1861), founder of Wallraf-Richartz-Museum
- Albert Richter (1912–1940), cyclist
- Wilhelm Riphahn (1889–1963), architect
- August Sander (1876–1964), photographer
- Elisabeth Scherer (1914–2013), actress
- Bernard Schultze (1915–2005), painter
- Helma Seitz (1913–1995), actress
- Vincenz Statz (1819–1898), architect and sculptor
- Rolf Stommelen (1943–1983), racing driver
- Jón Sveinsson (1857–1944), author
- Christine Teusch (1888–1968), politician
- Eduard Trier (1920-2009), art historian
- Gisela Uhlen (1919–2007), actress
- Oswald Mathias Ungers (1926–2007), architect
- Ferdinand Franz Wallraf (1748–1824), see Wallraf-Richartz-Museum
- Guido Westerwelle (1961–2016), politician
- Johann Peter Weyer (1794–1864), Stadtbaumeister
- Erwin Wickert (1915–2008), diplomat and author
- Leopold von Wiese (1876–1969), sociologist
- Hans-Jürgen Wischnewski (1922–2005), politician
- Hermann Wissmann (1853–1905), governor of Deutsch-Ostafrika
- Otto Wolff (1881–1940), industrialist
- Otto Wolff von Amerongen (1918–2007), entrepreneur
- Ernst Friedrich Zwirner (1802–1861), architect, Dombaumeister
- Helmut Martin (1940–1999), sinologist
