= Wolfgang Anheisser =

German operatic baritone (1929–1974)

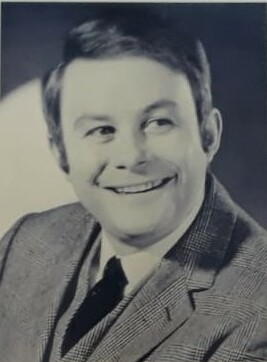
- Born: 1 December 1929; Cologne, Germany
- Died: 5 January 1974 (aged 44); Cologne, West Germany
- Occupation: Operatic baritone
- Organizations: Cologne Opera; Berlin State Opera

Wolfgang Anheisser (1 December 1929 – 5 January 1974) was a German operatic baritone. He was the leading baritone at the Cologne Opera from 1964 until his tragic death on stage there ten years later, where he covered the major roles for his voice part. From 1968, he was simultaneously a member of the Berlin State Opera in East Berlin. He appeared internationally, taking part in a world premiere at the Salzburg Festival and singing throughout Europe and beyond.

== Life ==
Anheisser was born in Cologne, the son of the musicologist and Mozart scholar Siegfried Anheisser. He received his first singing education with his mother, an opera singer. After his Abitur, he studied voice at the Musikhochschule Freiburg from 1954, where he was trained by Fritz Harlan, among others. He then attended the Conservatorio Verdi in Milan. From 1955 to 1960, he studied singing and musicology at the Witwatersrand University in Johannesburg, with Anni Hartmann. He already performed there during his studies.

After his return to Germany, he made his debut as Nardo in Mozart's La finta giardiniera at the Bavarian State Opera in Munich in 1961. He worked at the Gelsenkirchen municipal theatre from 1963, and was first baritone (Erster Bariton) at the Cologne Opera from 1964, engaged at the Berlin State Opera simultaneously from 1968. In Berlin, he appeared in the title role of Rossini's Der Barbier von Sevilla in 1968, staged by Ruth Berghaus, and alongside Sylvia Geszty as Rosina and Peter Schreier as the Count. Anheisser performed leading roles in the German and Italian repertoire, including Mozart's Count Almaviva, Guglielmo and Papageno, the title role of Lortzing's Zar und Zimmermann, Posa in Verdi's Don Carlos and Wolfram in Wagner's Tannhäuser, among others. He appeared as a guest internationally, including Lisbon and the Houston Opera. He performed in the world premiere of Orff's De temporum fine comoedia at the Salzburg Festival on 20 August 1973.

Anheisser was featured in recordings of broadcaster Westdeutscher Rundfunk (WDR), such as a 1967 production of Donizetti's Anna Bolena, as Rochefort alongside Teresa Żylis-Gara in the title role and Karl Ridderbusch as Henry VIII, conducted by Alberto Erede.

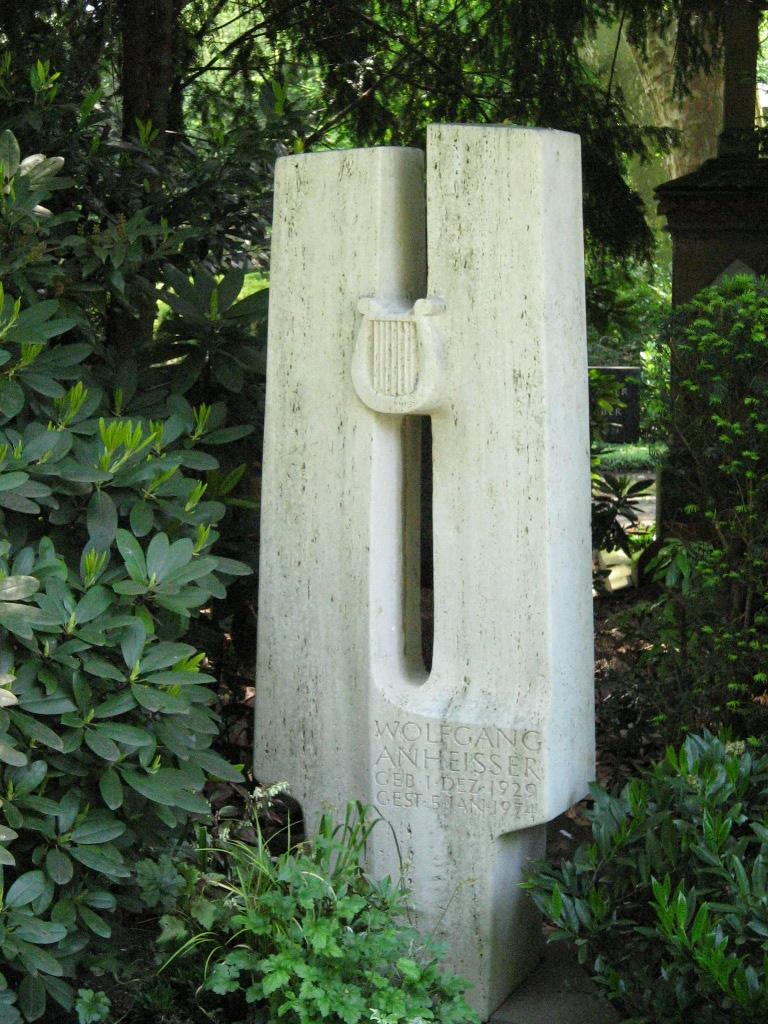
Gravestone at the Melaten Cemetery

Anheisser died in Cologne in 1974 in an accident at the Cologne Opera. In a New Year's Day performance of Carl Millöcker's Der Bettelstudent with him in the title role, he fell from a balcony onto the stage when the security device for a jump failed. He was buried at the Melaten cemetery in Cologne.

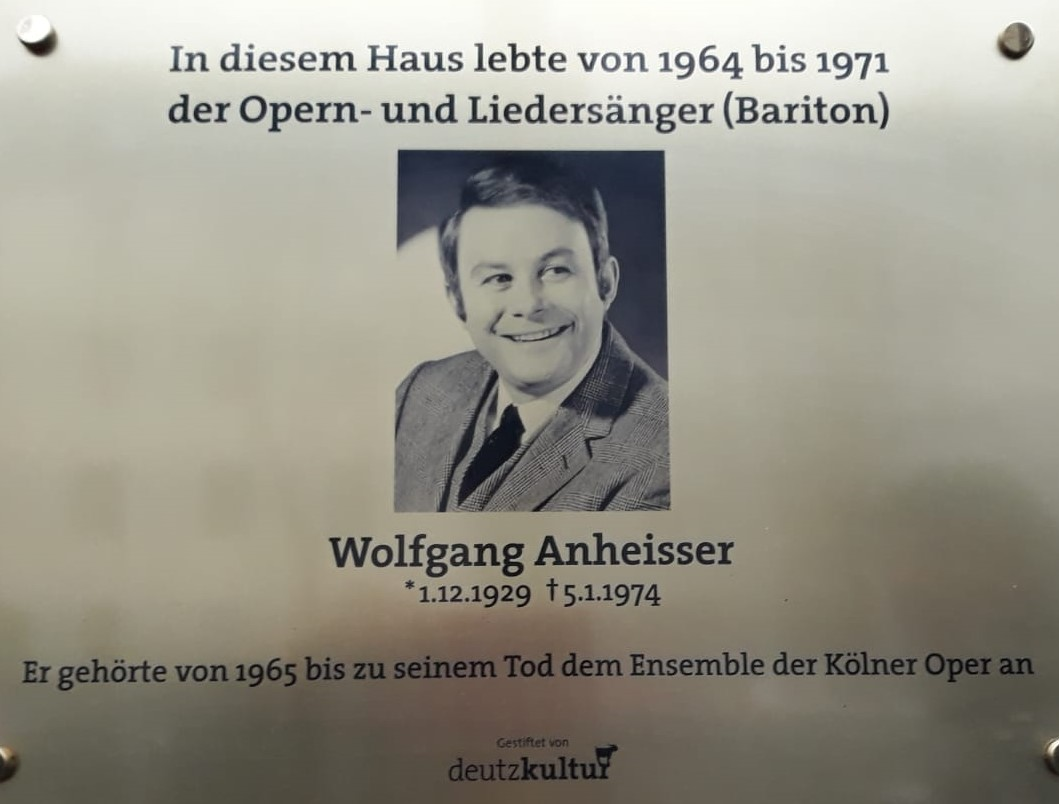
Wolfgang Anheisser memorial plaque, Gotenring, Deutz, Cologne

== Opera roles ==
His roles included:

- Title role in Handel's Giulio Cesare
- Kreon in Haydn's Orpheus und Eurydike (Cologne, 1968)
- Nardo in Mozart's La finta giardiniera. Munich Opera Festival, 1961
- Figaro in Rossini's Der Barbier von Sevilla
- Almaviva in Mozart's Le nozze di Figaro
- Papageno in Mozart's Die Zauberflöte
- Wolfram in Wagner's Tannhäuser
- Masetto in Mozart's Don Giovanni
- Guglielmo in Mozart's Così fan tutte
- Eberbach in Lortzing's Der Wildschütz
- Zar in Lortzing's Zar und Zimmermann
- Germont in Verdi's La traviata
- Sharpless in Puccini's Madama Butterfly
- Posa in Verdi's Don Carlos
- Valentin in Gounod's Faust
- Escamillo in Bizet's Carmen
