= Clouth Gummiwerke =

German rubber goods company

Coordinates: 50°57′55.5″N 6°57′41.4″E

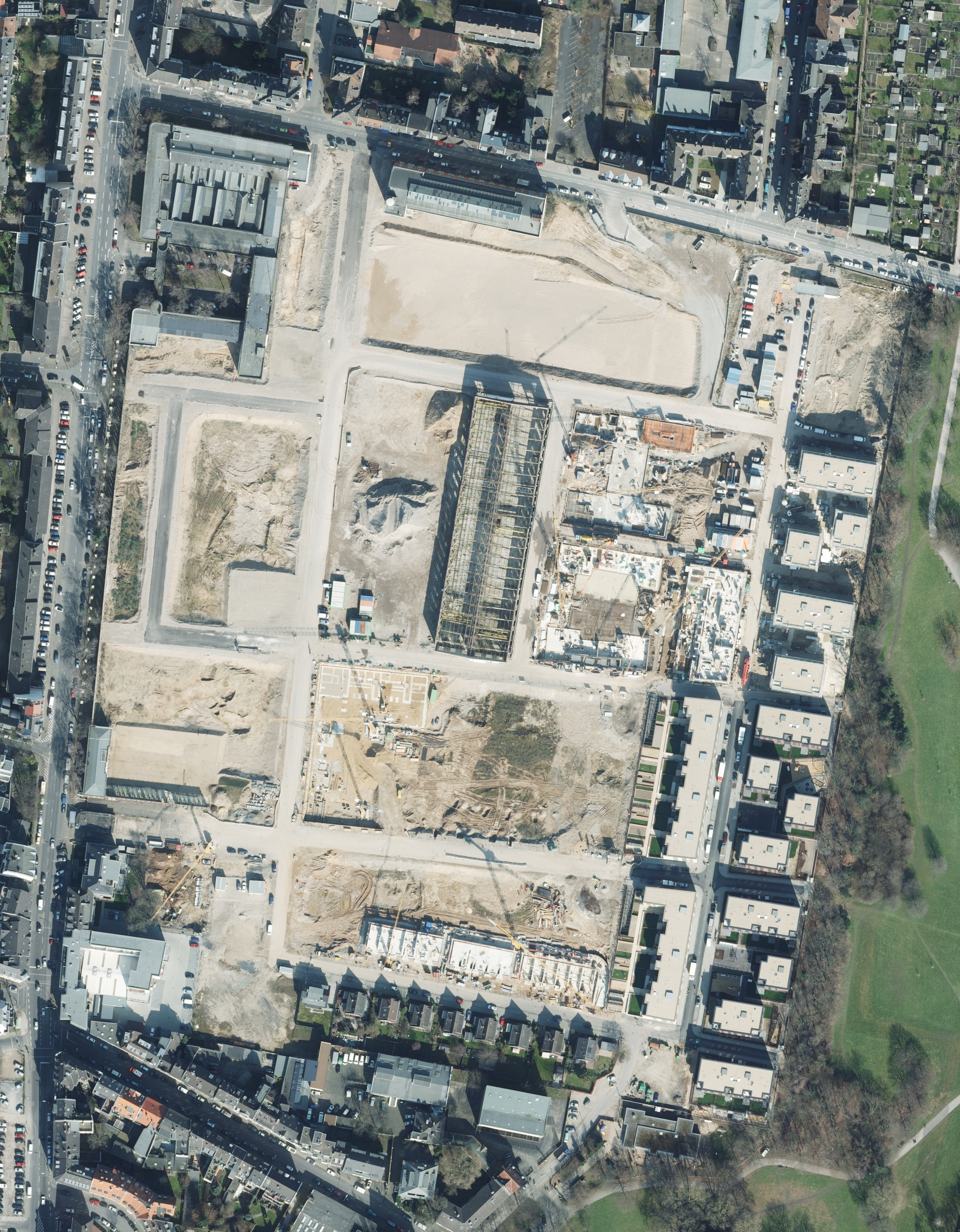
Aerial view of the redevelopment of the former factory site in spring 2016

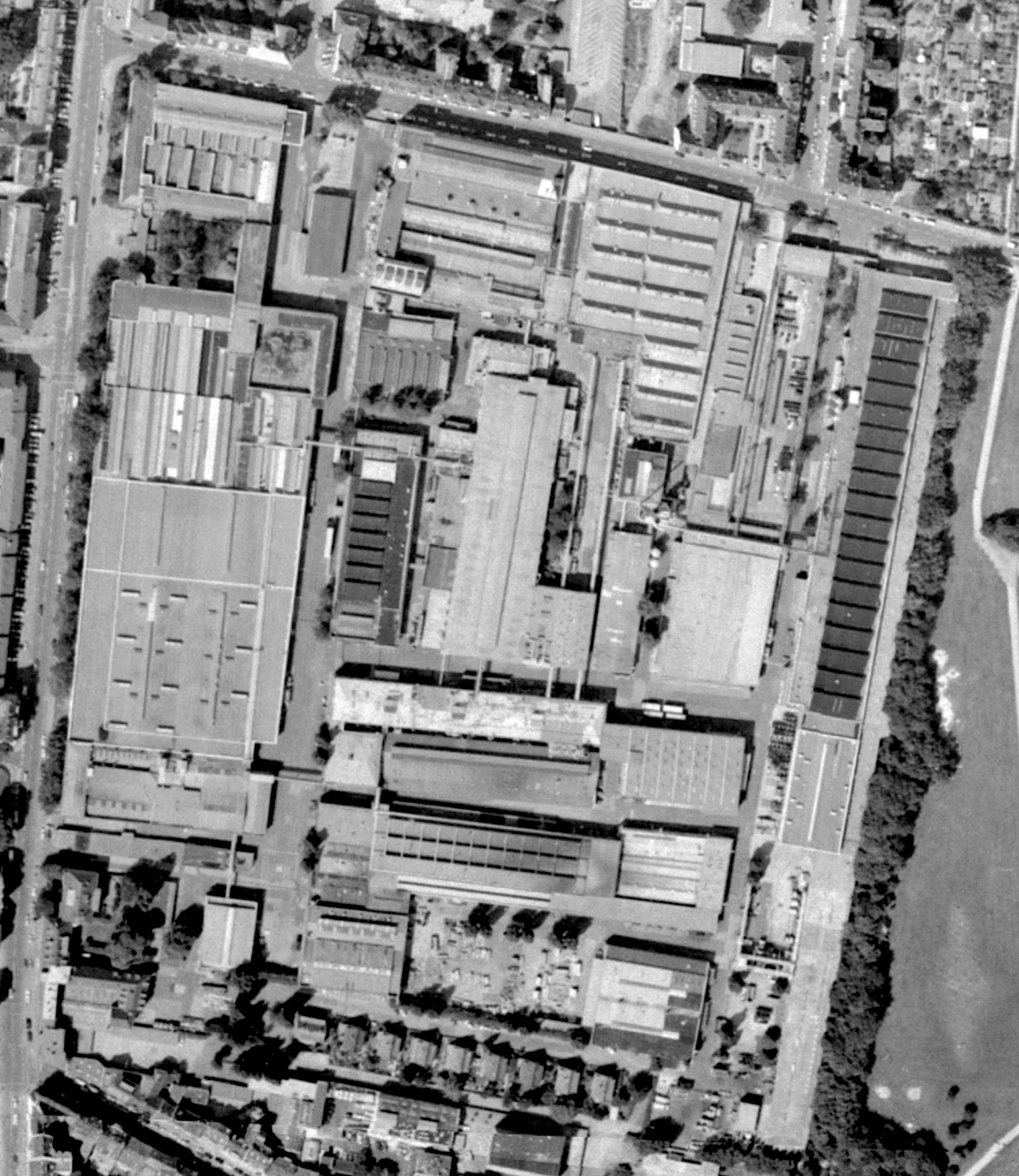
Aerial view of the Clouth -Werke between 1988 and 1994

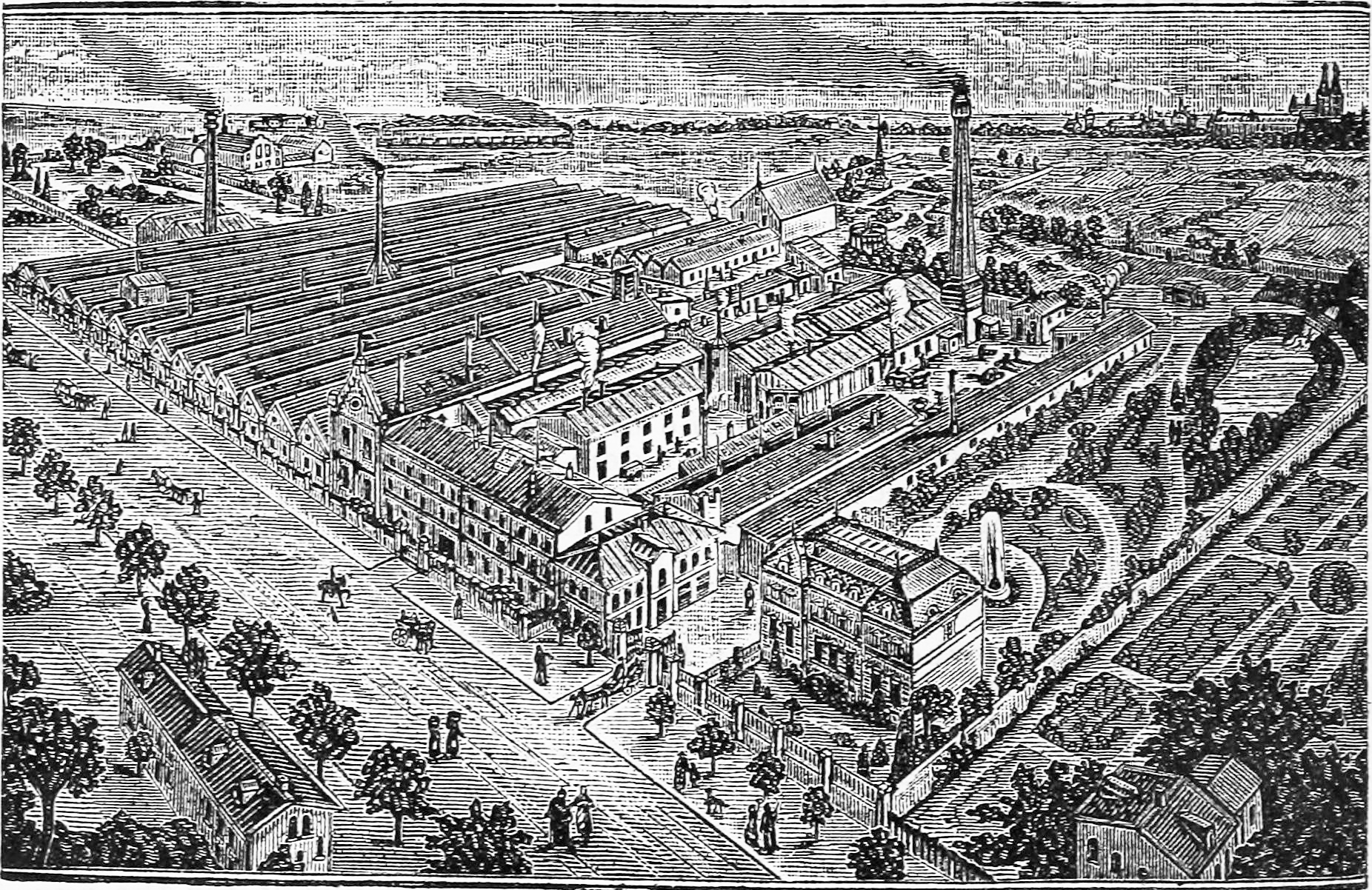
Clouth Werke from north-west, 1896

Clouth Gummiwerke AG was a rubber goods company founded in 1868 by the Cologne entrepreneur Franz Clouth. Parts of the company were temporarily owned by Felten & Guilleaume and Continental AG. In 1990, Continental took over almost all the shares. Later, some parts of the company were sold, and the remaining production at the Cologne site was shut down in December 2009. The Clouth Quarter is currently being built on the former factory site.

== Founding phase ==
On September 10, 1862, Franz Clouth founded the company with the name Rheinische Gummiwarenfabrik.

In 1864, the company was listed in the Cologne address book as Franz Clouth, Commissionsgeschäft in Gummiwaren zu technischen Zwecken (Franz Clouth, commission business in rubber goods for technical purposes); the company was still located at Sternengasse 3 in Cologne, where the Clouth family's home was also located. As the business grew, the company moved in 1868 to the Cologne-Nippes district on a site of initially 10,000 square meters. Carl Vorberg, who was appointed authorized signatory, rose to the position of co-owner in 1872 (until 1899), when the company was renamed Franz Clouth - Rheinische Gummiwaarenfabrik oHG (sic).

The first rubber products were household items such as milk bottle teats and suspenders, followed by industrial supplies such as roller coverings, conveyor belts or drive belts. In 1870, there were already 70 employees; a 50 m high chimney (1872) and a steam engine (1892) announced the beginning of industrial production. On September 14, 1891, the management of the company was transferred to the electrical engineer Georg Zapf. During this phase, the company diversified greatly, manufacturing diving apparatus (1882), which allowed the company to become the sole supplier of the Imperial Navy in 1887. In 1890, the Cable Works Department was founded, producing gutta-percha and fiber optic telegraph cables as well as telephone cables for the Imperial Telegraph Administration (1893), and the first knot-braided cables were used as city cables in Cologne (1895).

== Land and submarine cable works ==
The cable department expanded to an area of 20,000 square meters with 600 employees and was spun off on May 11, 1898 into the Land- und Seekabelwerke AG, a company founded specifically for this purpose. The company was able to win a spectacular contract for the laying of the first submarine cable from Emden to New York. This project, carried out as part of the Deutsch-Atlantische Telegraphengesellschaft, went into operation on September 1, 1900. Another contract involved the laying of cables in St. Petersburg in 1898, which were not replaced until 2001. The laying of an underwater cable between Wangerooge and the Roter Sand lighthouse and the cabling of the Kiel Canal also caused a stir. The capital requirements of the submarine cable works were so great that leading Cologne and Berlin banks (Bankhaus A. Levy & Co., Cologne; Dresdner Bank AG, Disconto-Gesellschaft, private banks Bankhaus S. Bleichröder and Born & Busse) as a banking consortium took over a 50 percent share, which they transferred to the Cologne cable manufacturer Felten & Guilleaume in 1901. F&G took over the remaining 50 percent from the Clouth family in 1904, so that the land and sea cable works no longer belonged to the Clouth family.

== Wide range of products ==
In 1901, the remaining company was transformed into a limited liability company (Rheinische Gummiwarenfabrik Franz Clouth GmbH), now owned by Franz and his son Max Clouth. Count Ferdinand von Zeppelin visited the company in 1898, bringing with him an order for 18 large drum-shaped balloons to be attached to the skeleton of the first Zeppelin LZ1. Clouth also developed and produced rubberized silk for the outer envelope and delivered the fabric envelope for the LZ1 in July 1900. Balloon silk was also manufactured by the company, and eventually Clouth-Werke produced its own free balloons: "Clouth I" through "Clouth V." The balloon "Clouth I" was put into service in May 1908. On July 14, 1907, construction of an airship hangar began on the company grounds. It was 45 meters long, 29 meters wide and 17 meters high. The first company-owned airship, "Clouth I," was built here and put into service on May 1, 1908. The airship was 42 meters long, had a diameter of 8.25 meters and a gas volume of 1700 cubic meters, so it was relatively small. Franz Clouth's son Richard was instrumental in its development. On June 3, 1910, the "Clouth" landed on the square in front of the "Bickendorf military airship hangar". However, the rubber industry's affinity for airships was not unusual at the time. Clouth also manufactured tires, initially for bicycles and later also for automobiles. As a manufacturer of bicycle tires, the company initiated the founding of the Cologne Bicycle Club, which had the Riehl bicycle race track built in 1889, spurring the bicycle boom in Cologne as well.

The plant developed into a specialist for rubber multi-materials (composites), a combination of rubber and other materials. In addition to diving suits, rubberized fabrics for wagon and horse blankets, children's toys, suits for miners and sailors, aprons and rubber gloves, tents, inflatable boats, medical rubber articles and special products for defense technology were produced here. The wide range of products made the company the largest employer in the district with 680 employees (1910). After the death of Franz Clouth, his son Max took over the management of the GmbH in September 1910, which continued to belong to the widow and children of the deceased.

The core areas increasingly became industrial molded articles (for the automotive industry, for example) and conveyor technology. On April 22, 1920, the company was converted into an AG (Rheinische Gummiwarenfabrik AG Franz Clouth) with a share capital of 6.5 million marks. This was completely taken over by the competitor F&G Carlswerk AG in 1925. In that year, an extensive structural expansion of the factory took place (halls 17, 18b) with the pavilion (gate 2).

== Nazi era ==
From 1939, the factory was almost exclusively occupied with war production. For this reason, targeted air raids were carried out against Clouth for the first time on March 13/14, 1942, destroying about 70 percent of the plant site. On October 15, 1944, the plant site was 90 percent destroyed in renewed air raids, and on March 6, 1945, the plant was occupied by U.S. soldiers. Production started up again as early as October 1945, as conveyor belts from Cologne were urgently needed in the Aachen coalfield and in the Rhenish lignite mining industry.

== Postwar ==
When Max Clouth died in September 1951, the Clouth family's interest in the company ended. The rubber balloon Clouth VIII took off from the Bonn distribution circle in December 1952 - Max Clouth did not live to see the start of his hobby. Steel cord belts were produced from 1955, and large-scale production could begin in 1957. Now there was a rapid economic development, which was also reflected in the growth of the number of employees. While only 700 workers were employed in 1951, their number rose to 2,100 in 1961, reaching a peak of 2,241 in 1962. In 1966, the tire manufacturer Continental AG had acquired 50 percent of F&G's share capital, so that one of the buyers of Clouth products now became a shareholder.

Several hundred patents have been registered in the company's history. One vibration absorber is the elastic rail bearing known as the Cologne Egg. The Cologne Egg was developed by Hans Braitsch, an employee of Clouth Gummiwerke in Cologne-Nippes, and a patent application was filed in 1978. The Cologne Egg was first installed in 1978 on the Ebertplatz - Lohsestraße line. Due to the excellent results (reduction of structure-borne noise), the Cologne Egg was installed on 1500 meters of track of the KVB (Kölner Verkehrsbetriebe) a short time later. Many other track sections followed. It was installed wherever ballast bedding for tracks was undesirable, for example at stops. The sound-insulating invention has been installed 30,000 times in Cologne alone and is in use worldwide.

The patent "ISAD" was intended as a replacement for the starter motor, flywheel and alternator in cars and led to the founding of the Clouth AG subsidiary ISAD-Systems GmbH in 1997.

From 1982, the company was known as Clouth Gummiwerke AG with the new shareholder (50 percent) Philips Kommunikations Industrie PKI and Continental AG (50 percent). In 1982, the plant area had grown to 146,000 square meters. In 1988, a high-performance production line for steel cord belts was built, whose 90-meter-long plant could produce steel cord belts with an annual capacity of up to 80,000 meters. From 1987 onwards, Clouth AG was plunged into a corporate crisis, triggered by product liabilities for defective products. This led to substantial losses, and in 1989 the crisis bottomed out. Continental increased its stake to 98.29 percent of the share capital in 1990, following approval by the German Federal Cartel Office in March 1990.

== End of the company ==
One of the main branches of production, rubberized fabric, was discontinued on March 31, 1992. In that year, the crisis was overcome. Finally, for further reorganization, it was decided to merge Clouth Gummiwerke AG with Continental AG retroactively as of January 1, 1997, where Clouth AG, burdened with considerable loss carryforwards, was part of the ContiTech division. In the process, the conveyor belt systems were transferred to Transportbandsysteme GmbH (Clouth plant). One unit was not merged with the other, but joined the ContiTech Group via Clouth Gummiwalzen GmbH & Co. KG (Bergheim) to the C. Hilzinger-Thum Group (Tuttlingen). A large proportion of Clouth's products continue to be manufactured by ContiTech. To this day, Norbert Ackmann GmbH (Hessisch Oldendorf) still produces the Clouth rubber roller spring and other industrial parts for mechanical engineering. ContiTech has commissioned elastoBAY e.K., a former Clouth employee, with market support. On June 17, 2003, the city of Cologne decided to acquire the company site, which now covers 160,000 square meters, in order to use it for housing and "non-disturbing commerce". It had to be taken into account that the buildings on Niehler Strasse were listed buildings. Conveyor belts were still manufactured here until December 16, 2005, since when Clouth Gummiwerke AG has become part of Germany's industrial history.

Abrissarbeiten Anfang 2012 und beginnender Neubau Mitte 2013 von Tor 4 gesehen

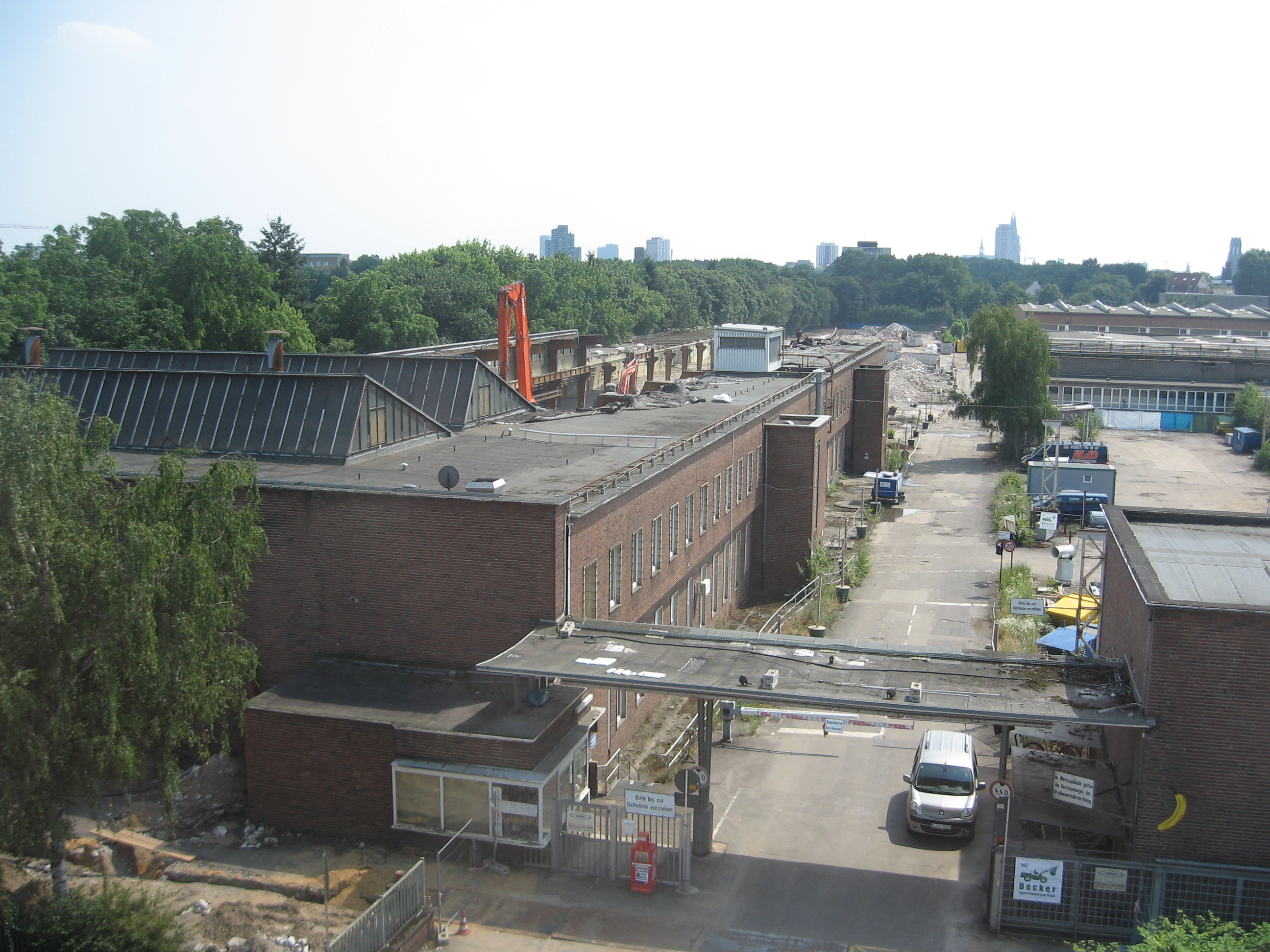
Frühjahr 2012 nach Beginn der Abrissarbeiten

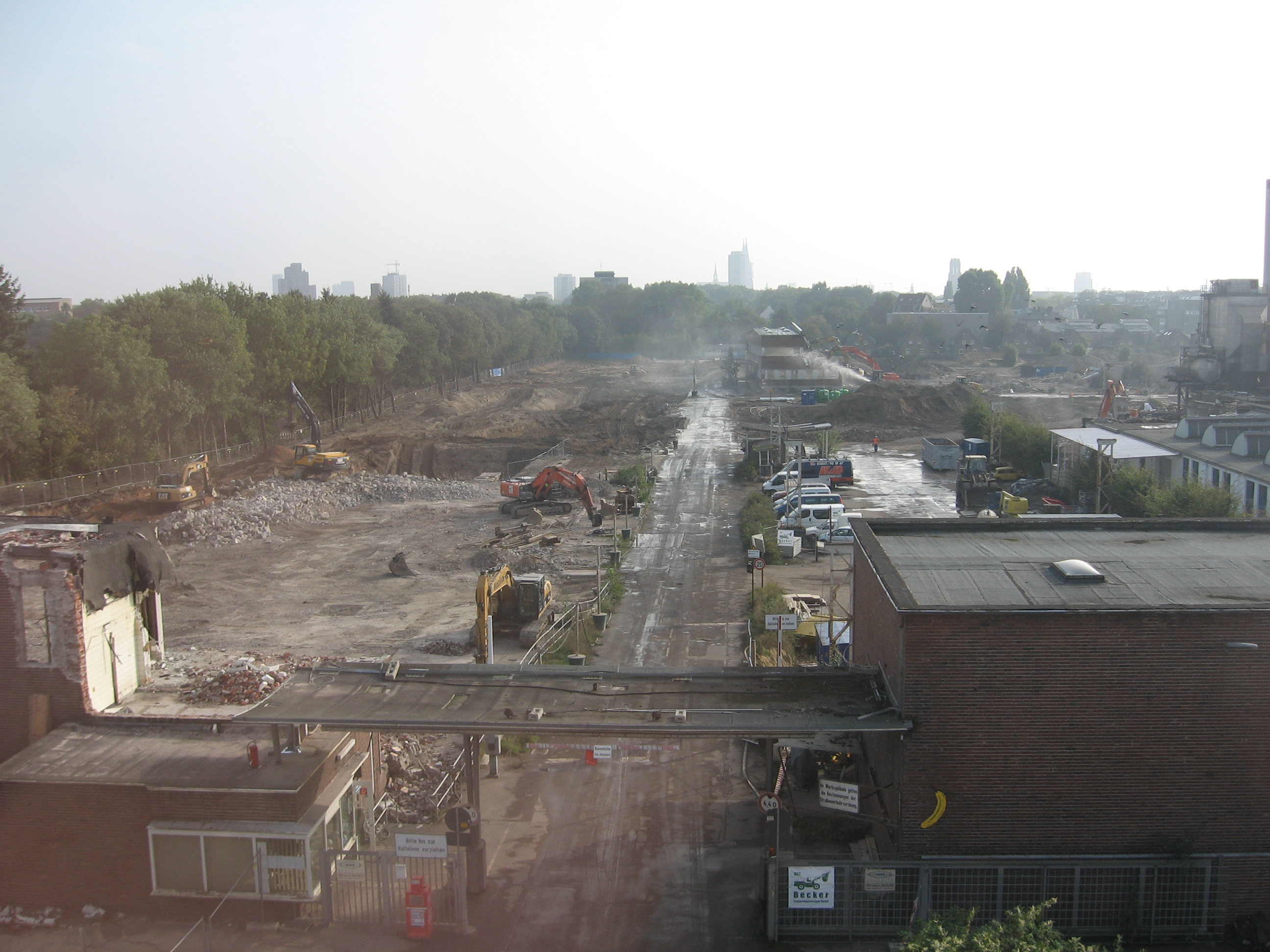
Sommer 2012

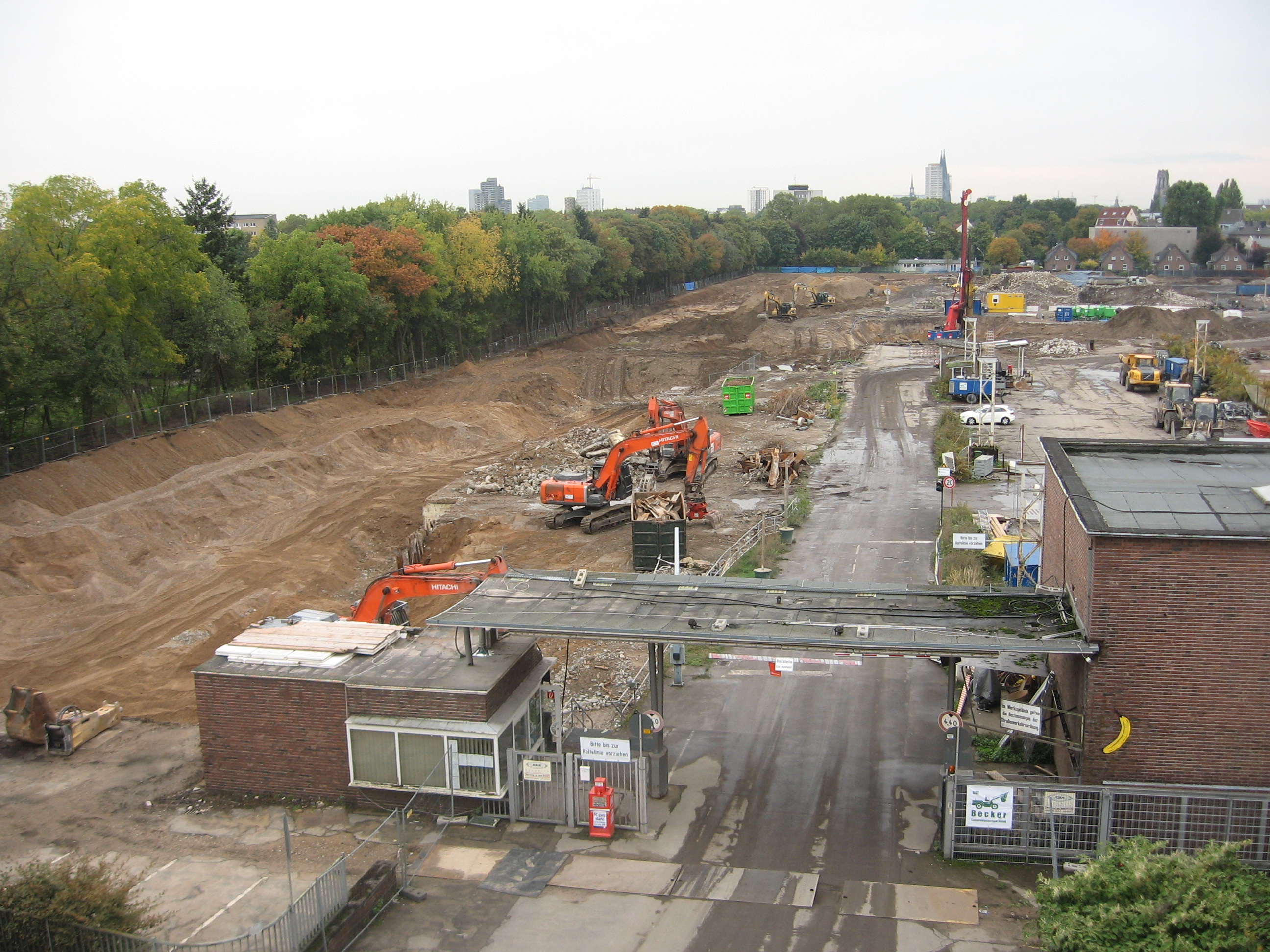
September 2012

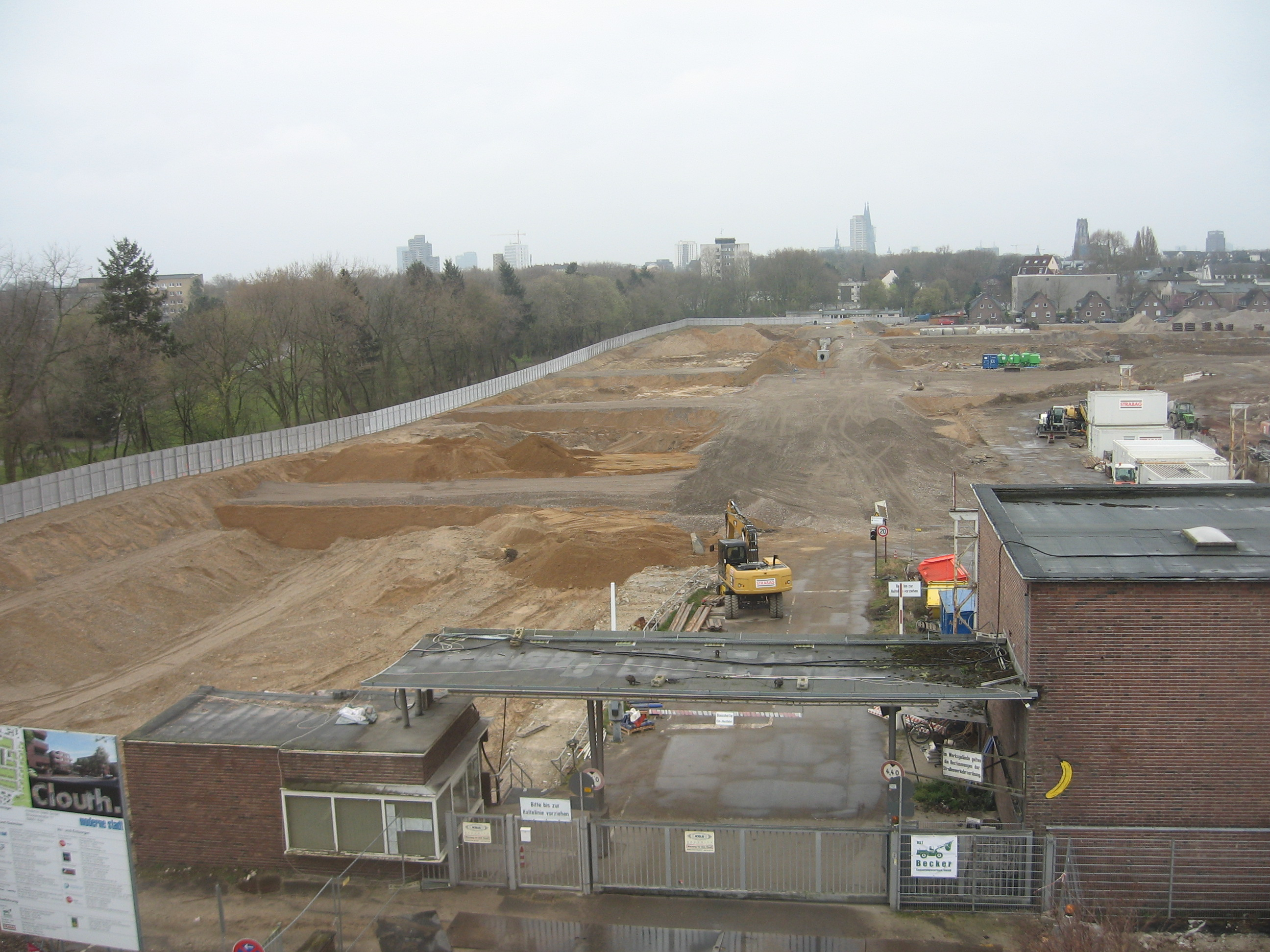
Dezember 2012

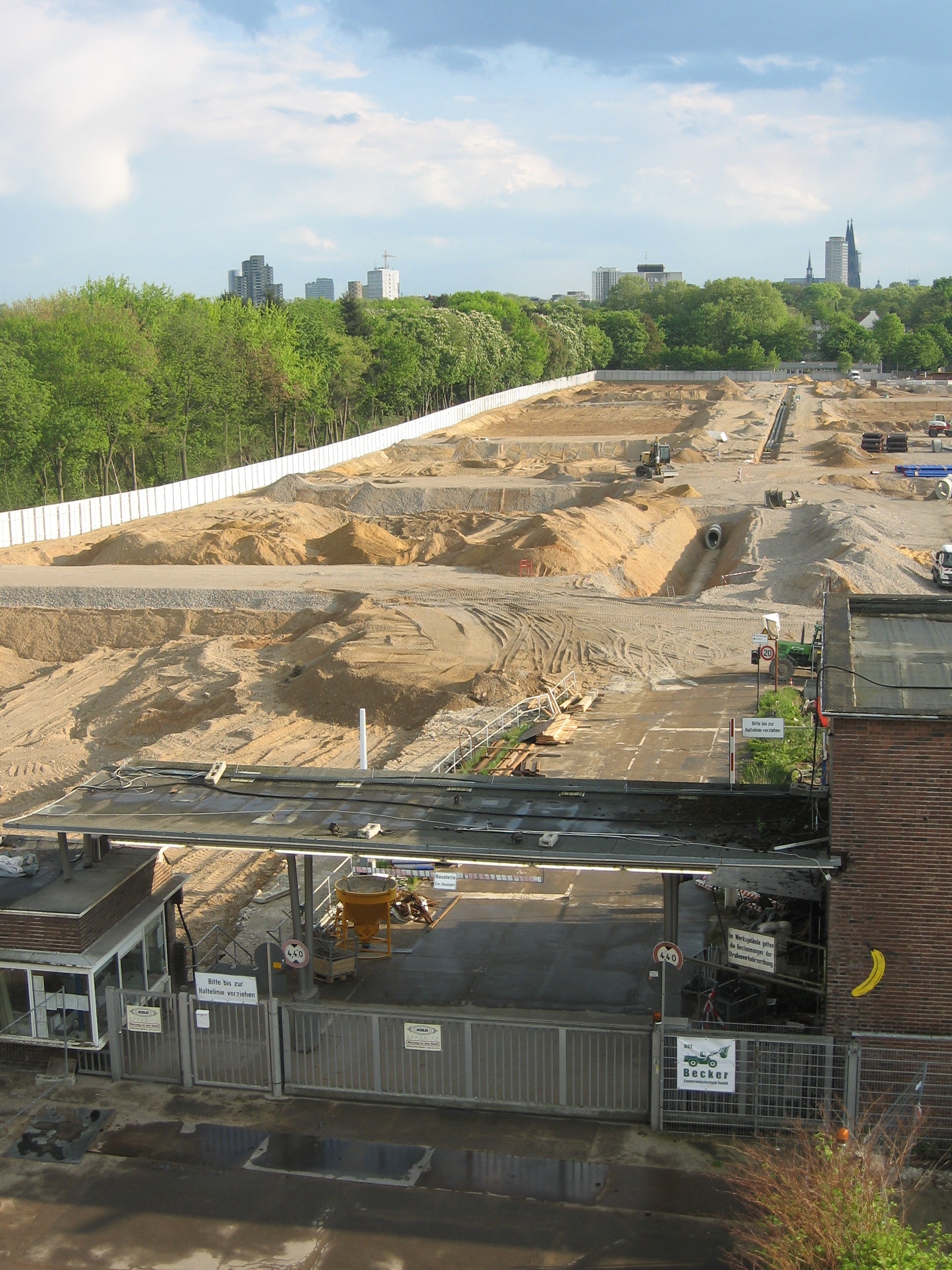
Februar 2013

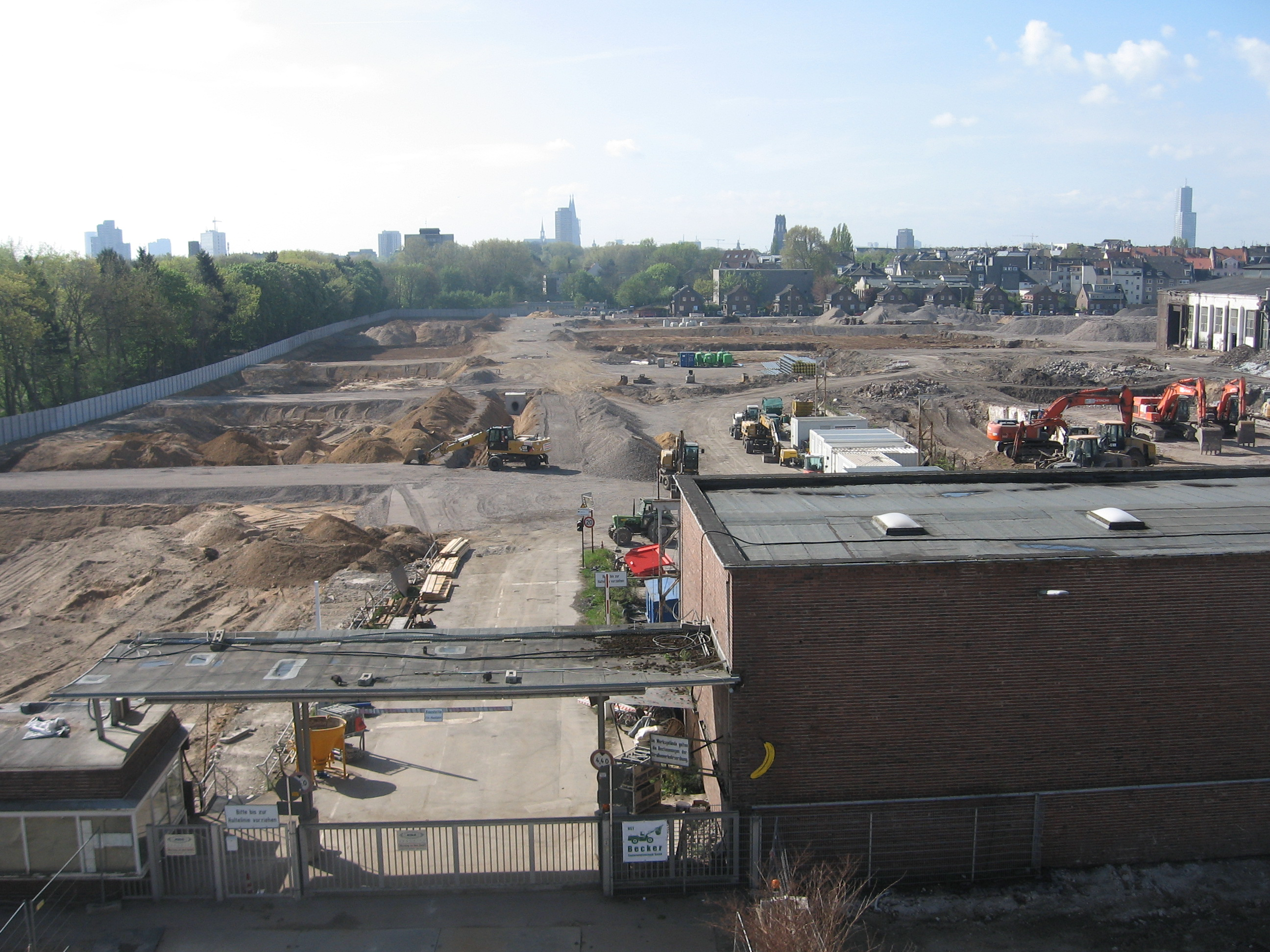
Bodensanierung Januar 2013

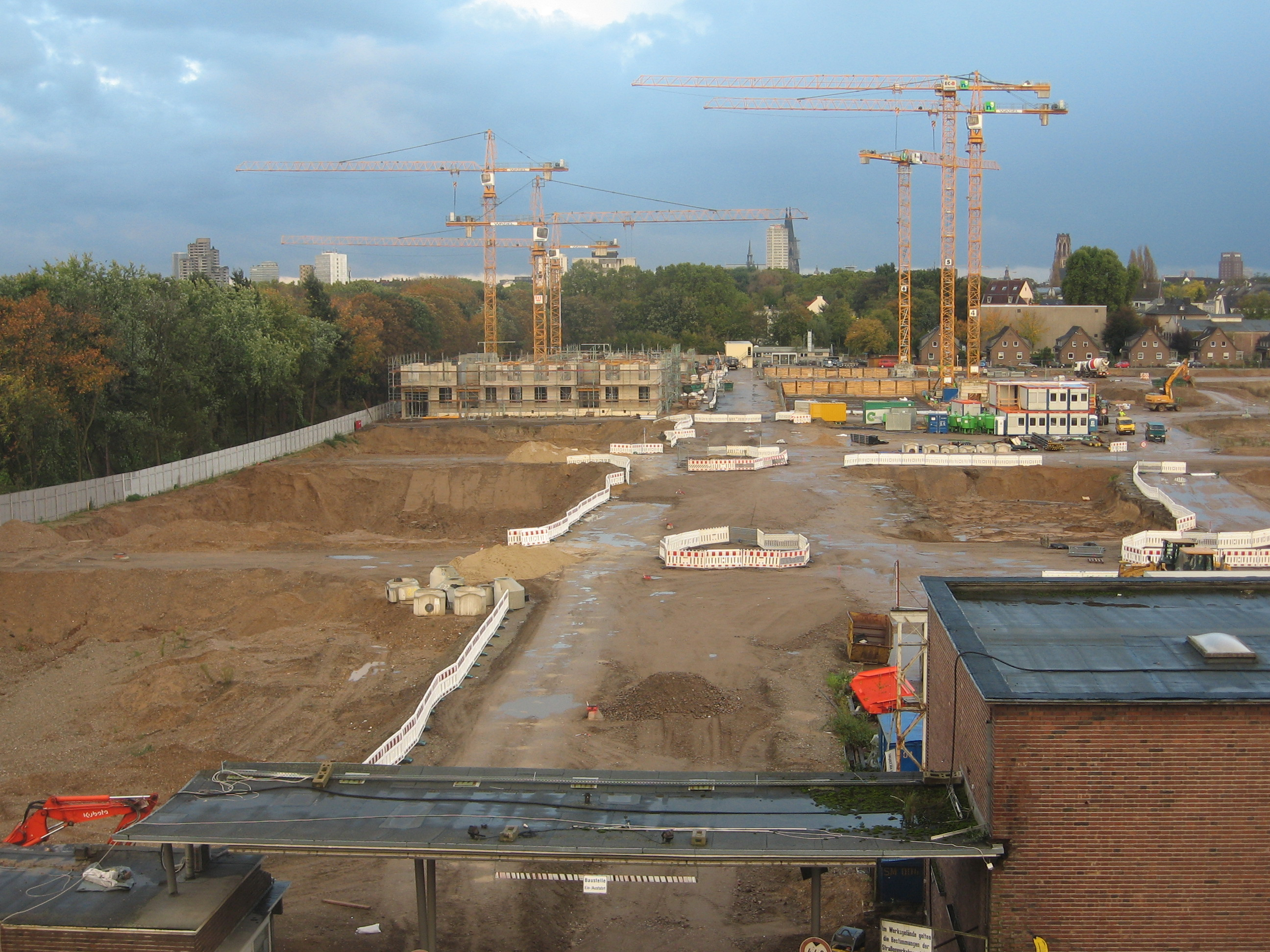
August 2013

The demolition of the factory buildings took until 2013. One of Cologne's largest new housing developments, the Clouth Quarter, will be built on the vacated site of around 14.5 hectares by 2021. Around 1100 apartments will be built. In addition, commercial space with a total area of around 25,000 square meters will be created, as well as areas for creative professions.
