= Otto Wolff von Amerongen =

German businessman (1918–2007)

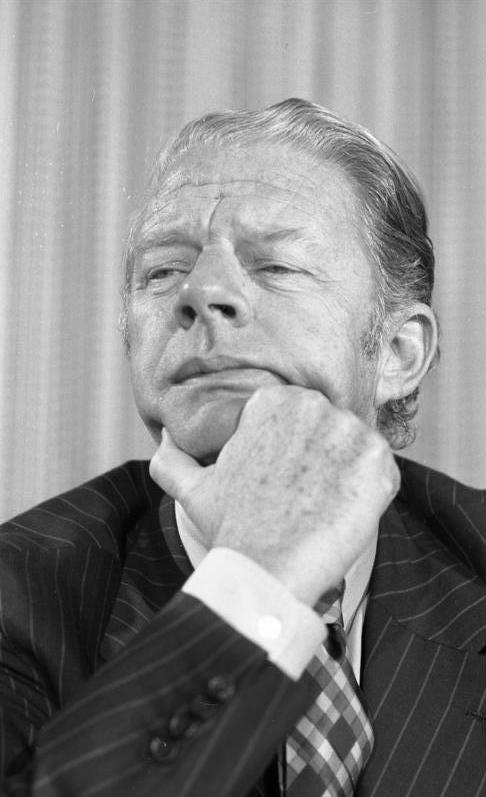
Otto Wolff von Amerongen, 1977

Otto Wolff von Amerongen (6 August 1918 – 8 March 2007) was an influential German businessman, who chaired Otto Wolff AG, one of the largest trading groups in West Germany.

His father was industrialist Otto Wolff, his mother Elsa von Amerongen. On his father's death he became a board member and co-proprietor of his father's business, the Otto-Wolff-Konzern. In 1942, during World War II, he was sent to Portugal to handle import-export business for the firm. He was briefly interned following the Allied invasion of Germany but was given responsibility for re-establishing the company's export business in 1947. On the 1966 flotation of the business, Wolff von Amerongen became chairman of the board, a position he retained for the next twenty years.

He held positions on the boards of other major firms. In 1971 he became a director of Standard Oil of New Jersey, later Exxon.

From 1955 he was Chairman of the German East-West Trade Committee, and served as Chairman of the Cologne Chamber of Commerce and Industry from 1966 and 1990. He was a member of the Steering Committee of the Bilderberg Group.

In 2001 he was awarded the Order of Merit of the Federal Republic of Germany, 1st Class.
