= Otto Wolff =

- Industry: metal industry
- Founded: 1904 in Cologne, Germany
- Founder: Otto Wolff
- Defunct: 1990
- Successor: August Thyssen-Hütte
- Products: Steel

Otto Wolff AG was a German steelmaker founded in Cologne by the industrialists Otto Wolff and Ottmar E. Strauß in 1904. One of the largest businesses in pre-war Germany, it exists today as an independent subsidiary of the ThyssenKrupp group.

== History ==
Otto Wolff Eisengroßhandel was founded in Cologne in 1904 by Otto Wolff and Ottmar E. Strauß as a steel trading and steel wrecking company. The business expanded following World War I, acquiring a share in Phoenix AG für Bergbau und Hüttenbetrieb (Mining and Iron Works) in 1917 and taking a 50% share in the Russo-German joint venture, Deutsch-Russische Handels-AG (Russgertorg) in October 1922, which was promoted by Lenin himself. By means of this largest Soviet joint venture he could prove that the foreign trade monopoly was not a handicap as his opponents claimed. The latter project ended after 15 months as trade with the Soviet Union came under stricter state control. In the 1920s, the firm was the nucleus of a group of metals, coal, and electrical companies employing around one million men. Its chief rival at that time was a similar trust controlled by industrialist Hugo Stinnes. In the negotiations with MICUM Wolff did not support Stinnes' commission of six but decided to make a “separate peace” with the French delegation.

Under the new National Socialist regime in 1933, Strauß was expropriated, being forced to sell his shares underpriced to Otto Wolff. Strauß died in Switzerland in 1941. Following Wolff's death the same year, the company came under the control of his son, Otto Wolff von Amerongen. During World War II, the company had success as producer of armaments for the Nazi-Wehrmacht.

Control passed to trustees after the Allied invasion of Germany in 1945, but Otto Wolff von Amerongen would resume control in 1947 following an internment of one year. The legatees of Ottmar Strauß tried to get back the shares they once owned in the company, but were unsuccessful. Several years and lawsuits later, they received seven million Deutsche Marks, a fraction of the original value.

The partnership became a public limited company in 1966, with Otto Wolff von Amerongen continuing as chairman until 1986.

The company was acquired by Thyssen in 1990.

It merged with Friedrich Krupp AG Hoesch-Krupp to form ThyssenKrupp AG in 1999.

Otto Wolff divided into two companies, known as ThyssenKrupp Otto Wolff N.V./S.A. (semi-finished plastic materials and aluminum profiles) and Otto Wolff Handelsgesellschaft mbH (metal materials, technical components and equipment).

ThyssenKrupp Otto Wolff N.V./S.A. is located in Mechelen, Belgium and belongs to ThyssenKrupp Plastics International GmbH.

Otto Wolff Handelsgesellschaft mbH is located in Essen with the following history:

In 1993, it relocated from Cologne to Düsseldorf.

In 2004, it acquired ThyssenKrupp Stahlunion Polska as well as an interest in Erich Weit GmbH.

In 2005, Isan Metall GmbH integrated into Otto Wolff Handelsgesellschaft mbH.

In 2010, it relocated from Düsseldorf to Essen.

In 2013/2014, it wsas integrated into ThyssenKrupp Mannex GmbH.
