= Ferdinand Franz Wallraf =

German botanist, mathematician, theologian, art collector and priest

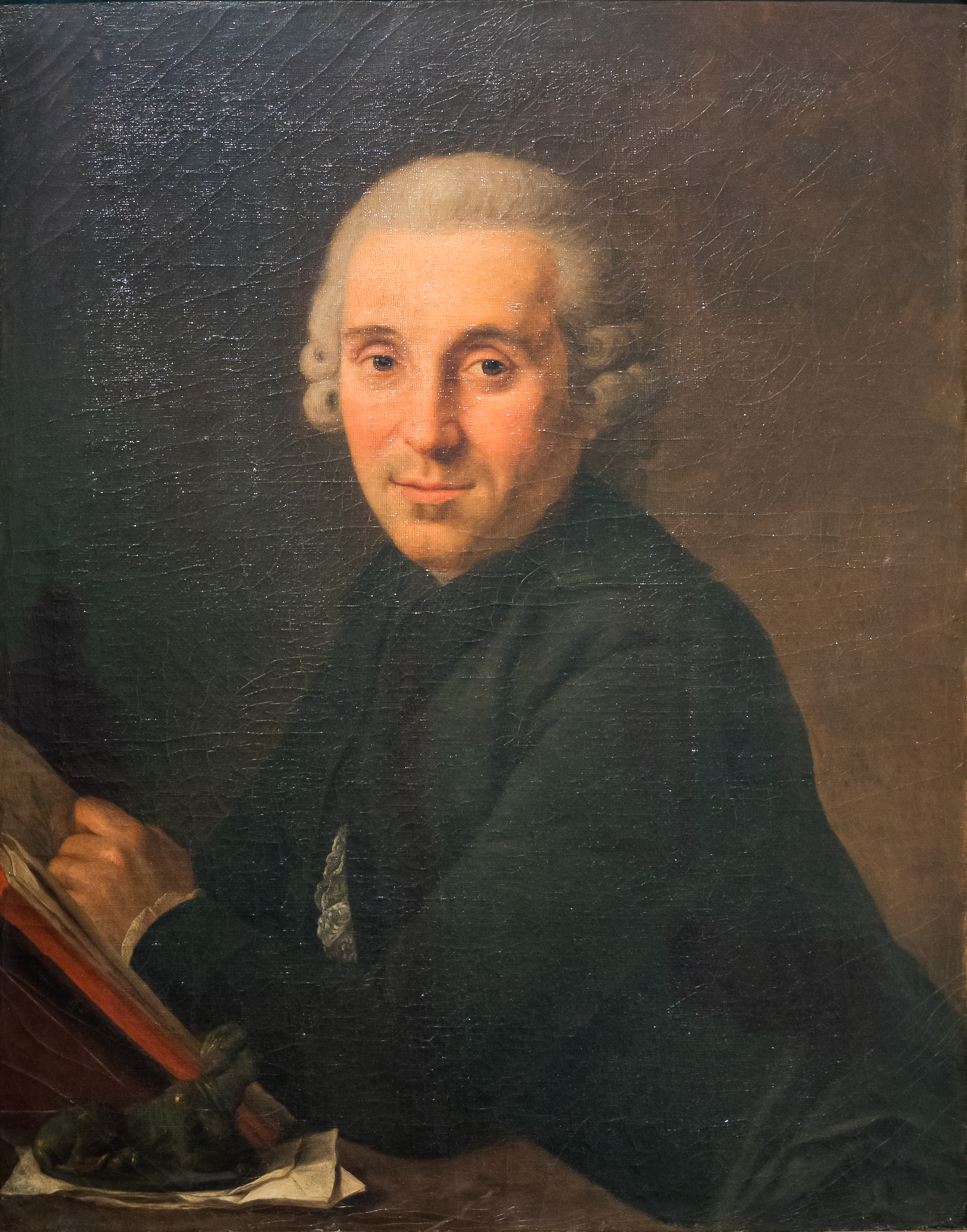
- Portrait by Johann Anton de Peters
- Born: 20 July 1748; Cologne, North Rhine-Westphalia, Germany
- Died: 18 March 1824 (aged 75); Cologne
- Occupations: German botanist, mathematician, theologian, collector and Roman Catholic priest

Ferdinand Franz Wallraf (20 July 1748 - 18 March 1824) was a German botanist, mathematician, theologian, art collector and Roman Catholic priest. His collection formed the founding nucleus of the Wallraf–Richartz Museum.

== Biography ==
He was the son of a Master tailor. After 1760, he attended the Gymnasium Montanum and, from 1765, studied at the Art Faculty; graduating in 1767 with a master's degree. He had no money to continue his higher education so, having received minor orders in 1763, he became a teacher. In 1772, he was ordained a priest by Auxiliary Bishop Karl Aloys von Königsegg-Aulendorf. Beginning in 1776 his friend, the Professor and physician, Johann Georg Menn (1730-1781), helped him study medicine. He obtained his Baccalauréat in 1778, and his Master's in 1780.

In 1784, the Universitas Studii Coloniensis awarded him a professorship and he became a Canon at St. Maria im Kapitol. As early as 1785, he was commissioned to improve the school and university system, but nothing was achieved due to inaction by the city government. By 1788, he was a Doctor of medicine and philosophy. In 1795, he was also made a Canon at the Basilica of the Holy Apostles. From 1793 to 1796. he served as a Rector at the Universitas. He used his own resources to restore the botanical gardens on the Zeughausstraße for research purposes.

When the Universitas was abolished by the French in 1798, during their occupation of the Left Bank of the Rhine, Wallraf became a teacher at its successor, the short-lived University of Cologne, in ine department of Belles Lettres. Although he swore an oath to the university, he refused to swear one to the First Republic. He was also named the "Conservateur des monuments". It was then that he began his own collecting in earnest; meant to eventually restore that of the Universitas. His collection included Roman excavation pieces, various medieval paintings, religious works of art, manuscripts and early prints, coins, fossils, historical weapons and sculptures.

In 1809, in his capacity as Conservateur, he was commissioned to design the new Melaten cemetery, using the Père Lachaise cemetery in Paris as a model. His plans included a recreational area and a green commons. That same year, together with his fellow teacher Johann Caspar Schug (1766–1818), he founded the "Olympic Society", devoted to cultivating art and literature, as well as preserving Cologne's unique dialect and humor.

In 1812, Mayor Johann Jakob von Wittgenstein passed along an order from the French government, engaging Wallraf to propose new, French names for the streets of Cologne. If possible, he was to use cognates from Old High German and Middle High German. To achieve this, he held frequent consultations with the printer and publisher, Theodor Franz Thiriart, who offered many helpful suggestions. He also took the opportunity to change mildly offensive names. For example; "Pißgasse" became "Passage de la Bourse". (Börsengässche). House numbering was reorganized according to the directions of General Charles Daurier, to make addresses more logically sequential. In 1813, Thiriart published the first Street Directory in French; the Itinéraire de Cologne.

He died in 1824 and was buried at the cemetery he had designed. The work of cataloguing his collection took almost two years. It was exhibited from 1827 to 1860 in what was known as the "Wallrafianum". Several museums in Cologne later drew on his collection to begin their own. The largest part is now at the Wallraf–Richartz Museum. His manuscripts are preserved at the city's Historical Archives. His library of 14,000 prints was also bequeathed to the city and is now held by the Universitäts- und Stadtbibliothek Köln.

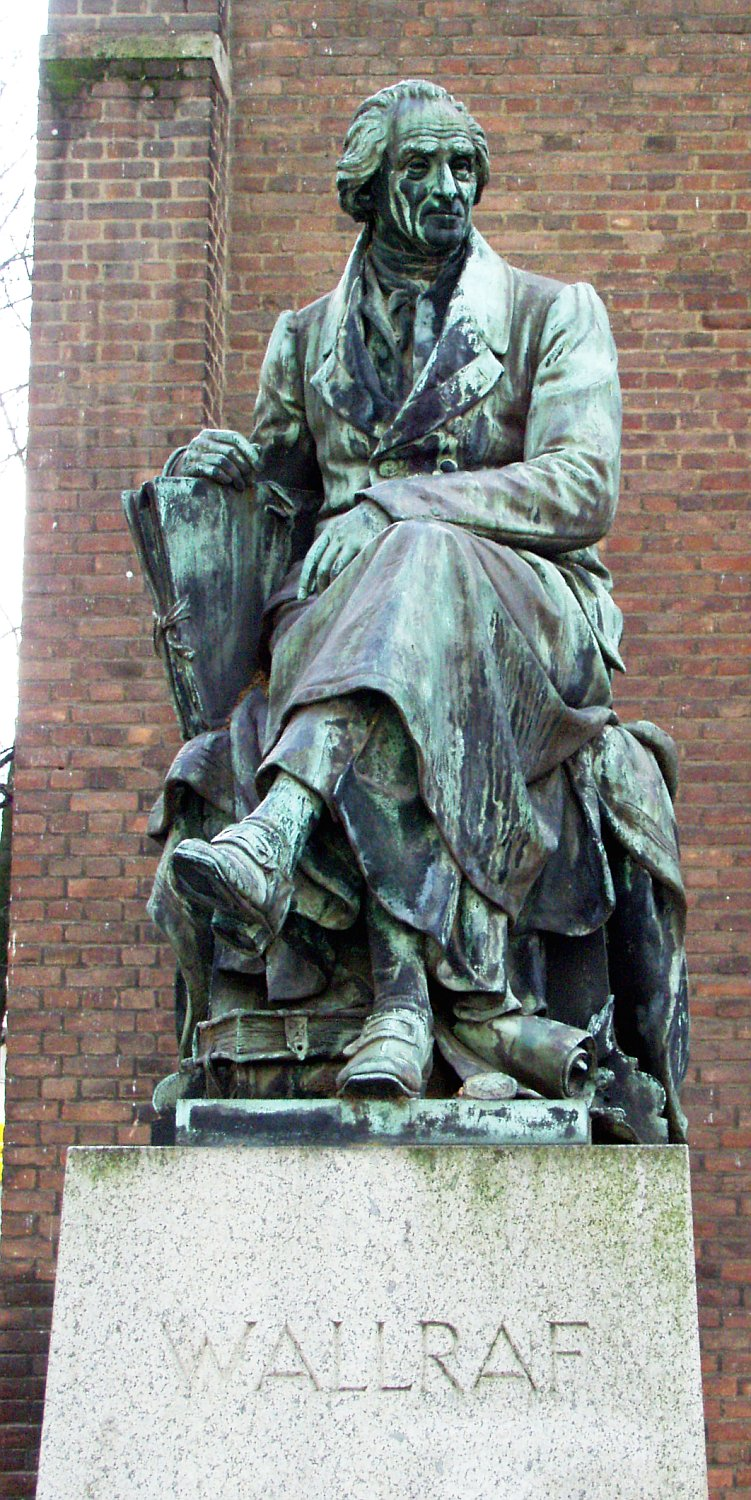
Statue of Wallraf by Wilhelm Albermann, at the Museum für Angewandte Kunst
