= Museum für Angewandte Kunst (Cologne) =

Applied art museum in Cologne, Germany

Coordinates: 50°56′23.15″N 6°57′17.43″E

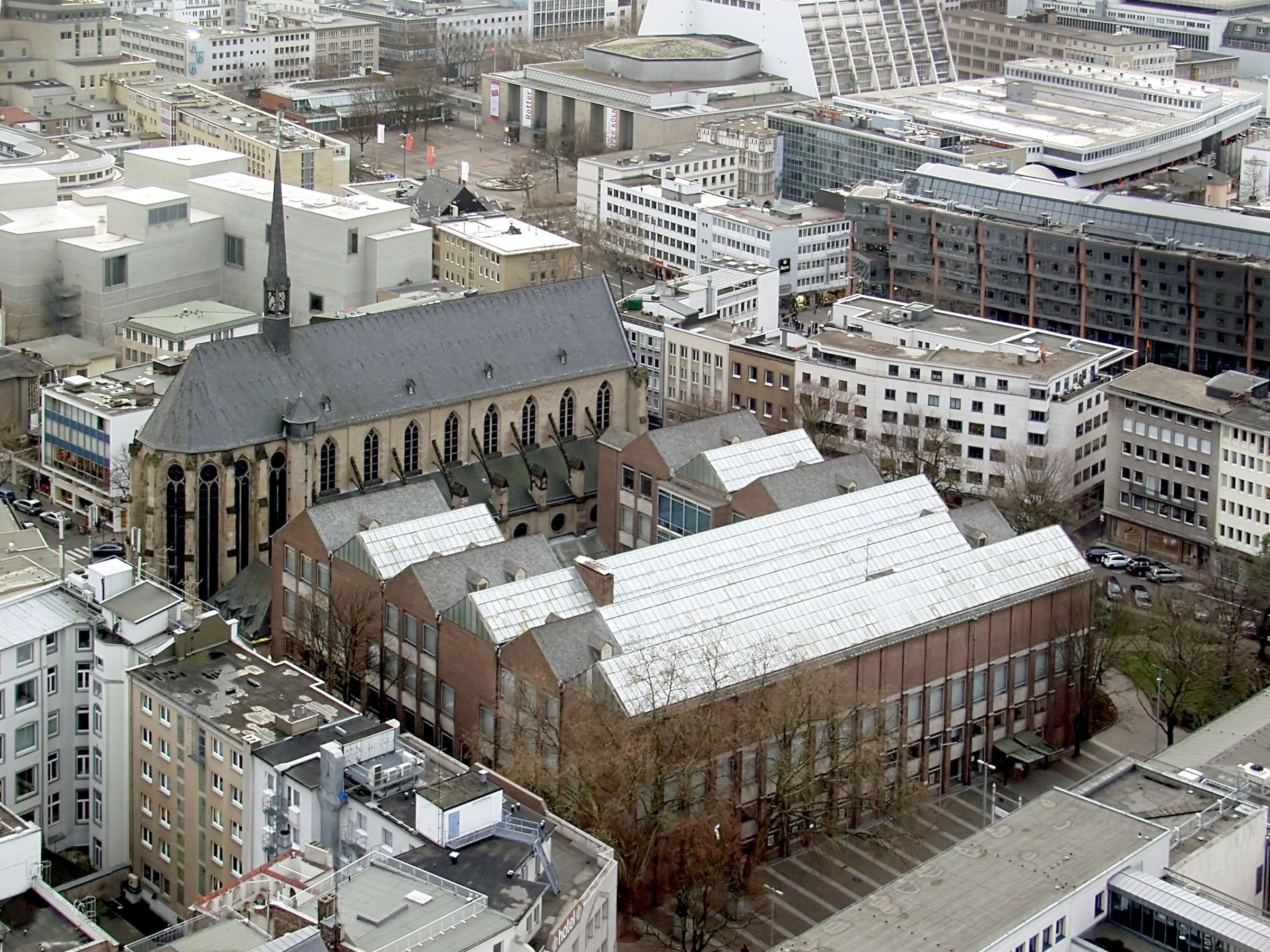
- Aerial view of the museum - including the church.
- Former name: Kunstgewerbemuseum
- Established: 1888
- Location: Cologne, Germany

The Museum für Angewandte Kunst Köln (German for "Museum of Applied Art"; MAKK) is a decorative arts museum in Cologne. The collections include jewellery, porcelain, furniture, weaponry and architectural exhibits. Until 1987 it was called the Kunstgewerbemuseum ("Decorative Art Museum").

== History ==
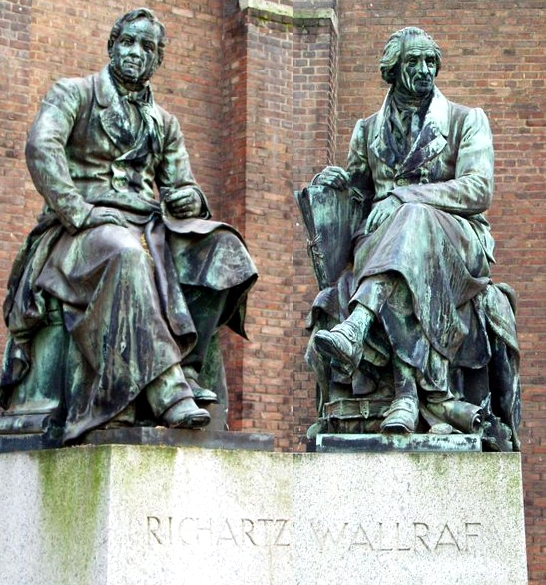
Statues of Johann Heinrich Richartz and Ferdinand Franz Wallraf in front of the museum (photomontage).

The city of Cologne decided to found an applied art museum in 1888. The core of the exhibition originally came from the collections of Ferdinand Franz Wallraf (1748–1824) and Matthias Joseph de Noël (1782–1849), and the exhibition was soon expanded through endowments. The museum's original location was a Neo-Gothic building on the Hansaring, built in 1900, but this was destroyed by bombs in 1943.

Since 1989 the museum has had a permanent home in the former building of the Wallraf-Richartz and Ludwig Museums at An-der-Rechtschule, built by Rudolf Schwarz and Josef Bernhard between 1953 and 1957.

== Building ==
The plain, red-brick Schwarz-Bernhard building stands on the site of a former Conventual monastery, whose shape is still traced by the ground plan and the square inner courtyard. The late-Gothic Minoritenkirche on the south side still survives. The inner courtyard wall on the north side has been almost entirely glazed, acting as a "shop window" for the museum. A low, modest antechamber leads into the museum's very large entrance hall and central staircase.

== Collections ==
The museum has a large collection (over 100,000 items) of European applied art from the 10th century to the present. This is arranged chronologically by era, and includes furniture, decorative carpets, small sculptures, dining utensils, luxury items, and decorative objects. For the sake of preservation, the textile collection is mostly displayed only in short-term special exhibitions.

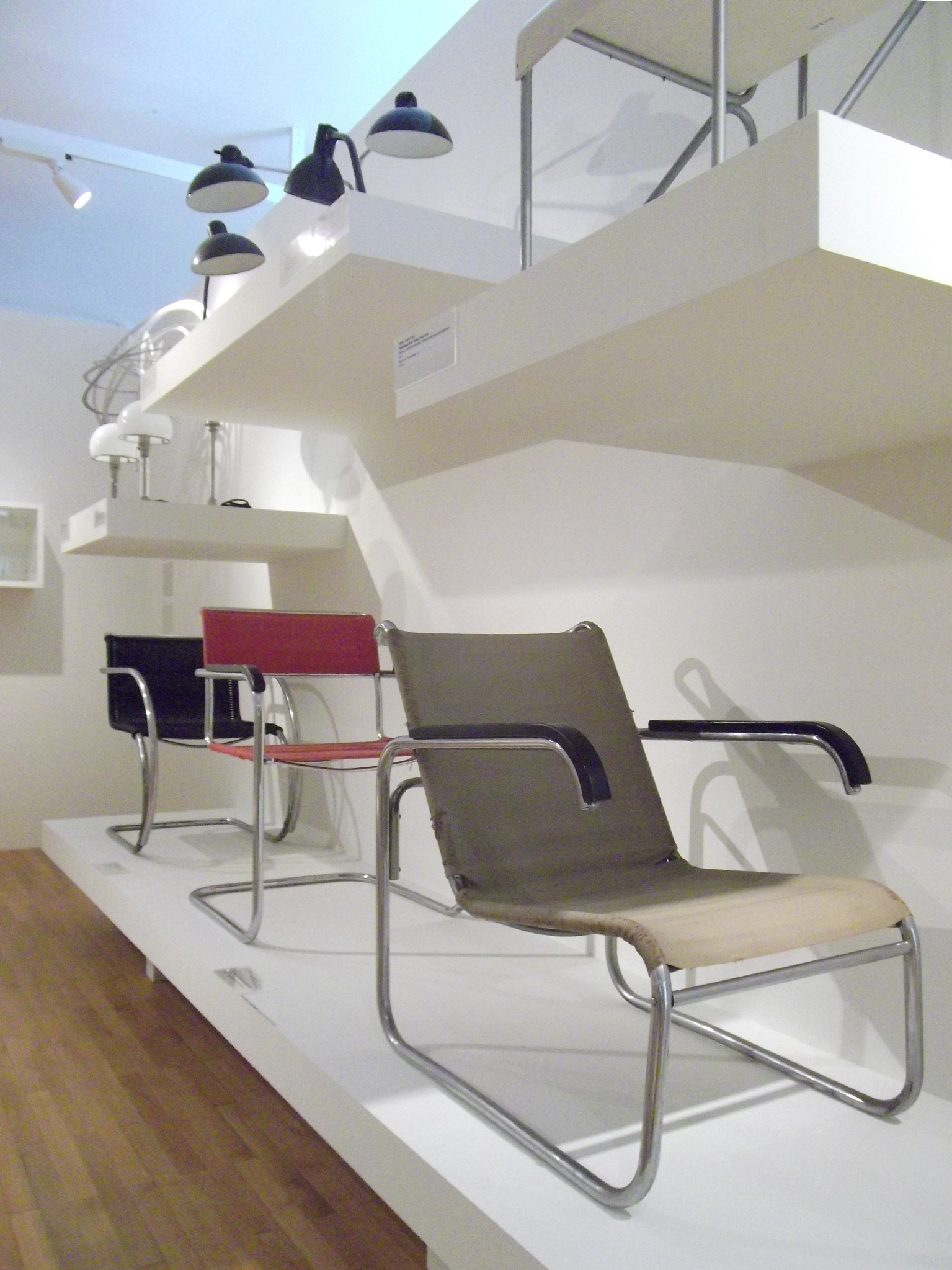
De Stijl and Bauhaus at the MAKK

The museum is particularly known for its collection of modern design. An exhibition of 20th century design, created by the Vitra Design Museum of Weil am Rhein in 2008, is spread across two floors of one of the wings. It features a thematic and chronological presentation of furniture, lamps, telephones, televisions, cameras, radios and household items, by designers including Ray Eames, Dieter Rams, Frank Lloyd Wright, Philippe Starck, Ettore Sottsass, and Joe Colombo. These are exhibited alongside visual artworks by artists including Wassily Kandinsky, Victor Vasarely, Jesús Rafael Soto, Piet Mondrian and Günther Uecker, in order to show the historical relationships between art and design.

Some individual exhibits include:

- A Woman of the Apocalypse by Tilman Riemenschneider (1495)
- A tapestry, Allegory of the Region of Africa (pre-1742)
- A writing cabinet with chinoiserie, from the workshop of David Roentgen (1777–78)
- Gerrit Rietveld: Rood-blauwe Stoel (1918)
- Piet Mondrian: Composition III (1920)
- Marcel Breuer: Liege (1936)
- Ettore Sottsass for Memphis: Carlton, shelf (1981)
- Naoto Fukasawa: CD-Player (1999)

The museum also hosts special temporary exhibitions.

== See also ==
- List of museums in Germany
- List of art museums
- List of museums in Cologne
