= Mary Beth Goodman =

American diplomat

Deputy Secretary-General of the Organisation for Economic Co-Ordination and Development (OECD)
- Incumbent
- Assumed office April 4, 2024

Personal details
- Born: Mary Beth Goodman; February 10, 1973 (age 53) Marion, Virginia
- Education: James Madison University; Chicago Kent College of Law; Georgetown University Law Center

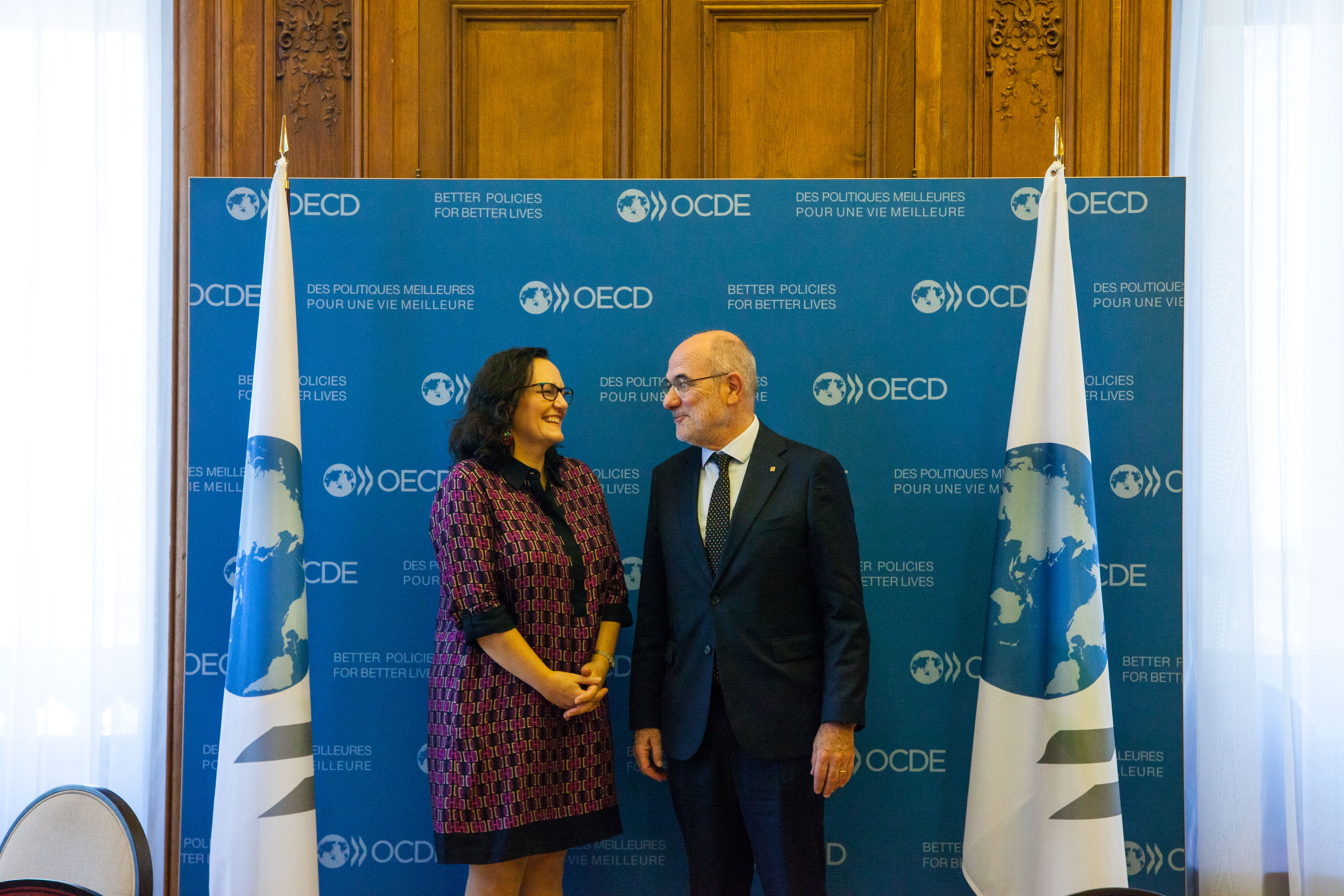

Mary Beth Goodman is the deputy secretary-general of the Organisation for Economic Co-Ordination and Development (OECD).

She is a former American government official, diplomat, and foreign affairs policymaker. Goodman is an international expert on illicit finance flows, beneficial ownership, open government, and accountability mechanisms that reduce corruption. She has worked with governments, civil society organizations, the private sector, and academic and international institutions to advance economic and human capital development, democracy, human rights and social justice around the world.

President Biden appointment Goodman as the U.S. Coordinator for Global COVID-19 Response and Health Security at the U.S. Department of State. President Obama appointed her as Special Assistant to the President and Senior Director for Development, Democracy, and Humanitarian Assistance at the U.S. National Security Council. Previously, Goodman was a career diplomat with the U.S. State Department.

== Personal life ==
Goodman has a B.A. in International Affairs and History from James Madison University, a J.D. from the Chicago-Kent College of Law, and an L.L.M in International trade and Comparative Law from the Georgetown University Law Center.

== Career ==
Goodman has worked on a variety of foreign affairs topics and foreign policy implementation. Her expertise is in international economic development; transparency and open government efforts; anti-corruption; tracking and interrupting illicit finance flows; stolen asset recovery; beneficial ownership; democracy promotion; and economic negotiations. She has taught student courses and led workshops for practitioners on these topics, including through Princeton University.

=== Early career ===
Goodman practiced international trade and customs law as an Attorney-Advisor at the U.S. Customs and Border Protection (CBP) at the Department of Homeland Security. She participated in the negotiations of several free trade agreements and oversaw the implementation of preferential trade programs such as the African Growth and Opportunity Act for sub-Saharan Africa and the Caribbean Basin Trade Preference Act (CBTPA) for Caribbean countries. While at CBP, she also advised importers on the classification and rules of origin for goods destined for the U.S. as well as compliance with retaliatory trade sanctions.

=== Diplomatic career ===
After joining the Department of State in 2003, Mary Beth Goodman served as a career Foreign Service Officer. She was posted in the U.S. Embassies in Bamako, Mali, Islamabad, Pakistan and served in several Washington, D.C.-based posts. During her diplomatic career, she developed and negotiated economic, trade, extractives, energy, and infrastructure agreements and worked on a broad range of international economic and development issues as well as anti-corruption, human rights, asset recovery, and illicit finances from Ukraine to the Middle East to sub-Saharan Africa.

==== Trade policy ====
Goodman was posted to the U.S. State Department’s Office of Trade Policy. Goodman negotiated the Association of South East Asian Nations (ASEAN) ASEAN Economic Community Blueprint, an economic engagement plan between the U.S. and ASEAN countries that ran from 2007 to 2015.

She served as the U.S. representative to the Asian Pacific Economic Cooperation (APEC) transparency and anti-corruption working group, and as the State Department’s negotiator of the U.S. bilateral free trade agreements with Malaysia and Thailand.

She also developed and advocated for the legislative proposal to create Reconstruction Opportunity Zones (ROZs) for Afghanistan and Pakistan announced by President George W. Bush during a 2006 trip to Islamabad.

==== Afghanistan and Pakistan ====
In 2007, Goodman was posted abroad, serving as the Deputy Counselor and then Counselor for Economic Affairs in the U.S. Embassy in Islamabad, Pakistan. She formulated U.S. economic strategy in Pakistan as the lead economic advisor to the Ambassador, focusing on macroeconomics, energy, transportation, bilateral trade, and customs. She also advocated on behalf of U.S. companies in Pakistan in investment disputes with entities of the Government of Pakistan and served as the primary liaison with the U.S. Chamber of Commerce, assisting with trade promotion for the 80+ Fortune 500 companies active in the Pakistani market.

Following her post in Pakistan, Goodman served as the Senior Advisor for Economics and Energy to Ambassador Richard Holbrooke, then the Special Representative for Afghanistan and Pakistan (SRAP). Beginning in 2010 as the Ambassador’s senior advisor, she worked on a multitude of issues during the height of the U.S.’ Afghanistan war effort.

On behalf of then-Secretary of State Hillary Clinton, she led the coordination of discussions between Pakistan and the U.S. on economics, energy, water, scientific exchanges, agriculture, and development. as part of the U.S.-Pakistan Strategic Dialogue. Goodman provided Congressional and civil society briefings, and served as the lead liaison with the Government of Pakistan.

In that role, she helped develop an economic development strategy for Afghanistan known as the New Silk Road, which included mining, energy, and infrastructure development in coordination with private sector and U.S. government agencies.

Congress and Ambassador Holbrooke and highlighted Goodman’s leadership in negotiations between Afghanistan and Pakistan for the Afghanistan-Pakistan Transit Trade Treaty (APTTA), a bilateral agreement to open cross-border trade, boost the economies of both countries, provide more efficient avenues for resupplying U.S. troops in the region, and reduce the flow of precursor chemicals used in the production of improvised explosive devices (IEDs) which threatened civilians and coalition forces in Afghanistan. She developed the U.S. Government's diplomatic strategy for countering the threat of IEDs, and this work ultimately led to an international cooperative effort under the auspices of the World Customs Organization called Programme Global Shield, a multilateral program in conjunction with the United Nations and Interpol. In this capacity, Goodman testified before the Senate Foreign Relations Committee in a hearing on “Jamming the IED Supply Chain in Afghanistan and Pakistan: Impeding the Flow of Ammonium Nitrate in South and Central Asia” which was threatening servicemembers, humanitarian officials, and civilians in the region.

Goodman also coordinated U.S. engagement on energy priorities with Pakistan and Afghanistan including the Kerry-Lugar enhanced funding of $7.5 billion.

In subsequent years, Goodman continued studying the region, particularly through the lens of anti-corruption. She published Corruption in Afghanistan articles recommending actions to reduce corruption and graft in Afghanistan, including calling on the U.S. Government to assist with Afghanistan’s accountability and transparency mechanisms.

=== Center for American Progress ===
In 2014 and 2015, she worked at the Center for American Progress, a progressive think tank studying domestic and foreign policy issues. She led CAP’s research on illicit finance, sanctions, corruption and development, with a focus on Africa and South Asia.

She also provided expertise, developed partnerships, and supported the work of the CAP national security & international policy team by developing approaches to countering illicit activity using financial and nonmilitary tools.

Simultaneously, she developed, launched and worked at The Sentry, a civil society initiative co-founded by George Clooney and John Prendergast that conducts forensic investigations on the connection between kleptocracy, corruption, and human rights abuses in Africa. At the same time, she served as Senior Advisor to the ENOUGH Project, a sister organization started by Gayle Smith and John Prendergast as a project of the Center for American Progress to end genocide and crimes against humanity by investigating the financial drivers of mass atrocities.

=== The White House ===
==== August 2011-December 2013 ====
In 2011, Goodman joined the U.S. National Security Council, where she spent more than two years as the Director for International Economics.

In this position, she developed public policy recommendations for senior officials and coordinated White House engagement on a broad range of international economic and development issues, including anti-corruption, transparency, extractives, beneficial ownership, fossil fuel subsidy reform, and women’s empowerment. As part of these efforts, she liaised with non-governmental organizations and private sector partners to coordinate implementation of policy through public-private partnerships.

Goodman coordinated interagency policy development for economic assistance to the Middle East and North Africa in the wake of the Arab Spring. She created new multilateral effort to recover assets stolen by corrupt regimes which resulted in streamlined judicial processing and enhanced international coordination among 40+ countries via the Arab Forum for Asset Recovery.

She managed the U.S. interagency process to support U.S. domestic implementation of the Extractives Industry Transparency Initiative and coordinate international outreach on company disclosures for enhanced extractives transparency.

While at the NSC, Goodman also served as the lead U.S. representative to the Group of Twenty (G-20) Working Group on Anti-Corruption, as well as the Group of Eight (G-8) Transparency Advisory Committee. In the negotiations for both Summits, she was responsible for coordinating policy on anti-corruption, transparency, beneficial ownership, extractives, land, and open data. She then staffed President Obama for trips to the G-8 and G-20 Summits, the United Nations General Assembly, and other bilateral and multilateral engagements.

Goodman was involved in the 2011 launch of the Open Government Partnership, a unique partnership between government leaders from 78 countries and civil society advocates that promotes transparent, participatory, inclusive and accountable governments. She co-led the creation of the OGP action plans for the United States and served on the OGP Steering Committee from its inception in 2011 until 2017. She now serves as an OGP Envoy within the organization’s Action Network.

==== June 2015 - January 2017 ====
Goodman returned to the NSC in June 2015, serving as the Special Assistant to President Obama and Senior Director at the U.S. National Security Council for Development, Democracy, and Humanitarian Assistance until the end of the Administration. In this role, she was responsible for advising the President of the United States and the National Security Advisor, as well as coordinating policy development and strategies across the U.S. Government on a wide range of issues, stretching from food security to access to electricity, from girls education to developing communities' access to the economy, and from anti-corruption to transparent governments and economies.

After re-joining the NSC, Goodman participated in the negotiations of and coordinated a number of U.S. Government efforts related to the Addis Ababa Action Agenda, which aims to diversify sources of international development financing by increasing domestic resource mobilization in developing countries and securing public-private funding (blended finance) to complement traditional foreign assistance from wealthy countries.

Following the Addis Ababa negotiations, Goodman participated in the U.N. negotiations for the 2030 Agenda for Sustainable Development. This agenda was designed to replace the Millennium Development Goals, which expired at the end of 2015.

As an anti-corruption expert, Goodman led international efforts on the topic, and on transparency and citizen participation in government. She coordinated the U.S. involvement with the global Open Government Partnership, a 70-country platform driving greater transparency and accountability around the world, which she had helped launch as a Director for International Economics at the National Security Council. Goodman also played a key role in the U.S. Government’s response to the Panama Papers, and joined the American delegation to the U.K.’s 2016 Anti-Corruption Forum during which the U.S. made commitments to advancing anti-corruption objectives domestically and globally.

As Senior Director for Development and Democracy, Goodman led the negotiations between the U.S. and the Chinese governments to partner on joint international development goals. This resulted in the 2015 Memorandum of Understanding on U.S.-China Development Cooperation. In this agreement—the first of its kind between China and the U.S.—the two countries committed to collaborating in agriculture, technology, and public health development investments, with an emphasis on capacity building and technical assistance.

In the last six months of the Obama Administration, Goodman assisted President Obama in efforts to secure major commitments on international development. The culmination of these efforts was the White House Summit on Global Development: Real Lives, Real Outcomes, held in July 2016.

The Summit “brought together development leaders, public and private sector partners, civil society, diplomats, and entrepreneurs to discuss the progress achieved by the Administration’s approach to development and chart a course forward to continue the progress in the years ahead. There were a series of panel discussions throughout the day that highlighted President Obama's global development initiatives. Strive Masiyiwa introduced President Obama, who spoke at the summit.”

=== Efforts to combat illicit financial flows ===
In 2017 Goodman joined the World Bank Group as a Senior Advisor for the Stolen Asset Recovery Initiative (StAR). With this initiative, she coordinated efforts to recuperate assets stolen and plundered through grand corruption. She worked with governments, financial centers and civil society to negotiate the recovery and return of stolen assets and was instrumental in the launch of the Global Forum on Asset Recovery.

=== Global COVID-19 response ===
==== U.S. Coordinator for Global COVID-19 Response and Health Security, U.S. Department of State ====
In March 2021, U.S. Secretary of State Antony Blinken created a position to lead the U.S. Government’s international engagements related to COVID-19. Beginning in April 2021, Goodman served as a Senior Advisor on the COVID-19 response team, supporting the U.S. Coordinator for Global COVID-19 Response and Health Security. In this role, Goodman focused on COVID financing, capacity, and global efforts to equitably distribute COVID vaccines around the world.

On November 30, 2021, Secretary of State Antony Blinken named Goodman as the U.S. Coordinator for Global COVID-19 Response and Health Security, taking over for Gayle Smith.

As part of this program, Goodman worked on the 2022 COVAX Investment Opportunity, an approach to funding the World Health Organization's COVAX Facility, which provided vaccinations to low- and middle-income countries.

Goodman led diplomatic negotiations between a curated group of countries to address continued shortfalls in the COVID pandemic response. The effort came to be known as “The GAP” and worked to address vaccine deliveries, vaccinations for healthcare workers worldwide, mis and dis-information related to the pandemic as well as therapeutics.

Goodman helped develop and create a global trust fund, the Pandemic Fund, to address continued shortfalls in financing for pandemic related health spending and served on the initial governing board of the Pandemic Fund, a joint effort of the World Bank and World Health Organization.

=== Other initiatives ===
Goodman has continued her work on financial transparency, transparency in government, and open data after leaving the White House. Since 2018, she has served on the Board of Directors for the International Center for Not-for-Profit Law. In 2019, she became a Senior Fellow with the Digital Impact and Governance Initiative (DIGI) at New America where she developed a digital ledger technology solution for oversight of asset repatriation. Working with government and private sector partners, DIGI develops technology platforms to improve how public institutions serve and engage with their citizens.

Goodman was a visiting lecturer from 2019- 2021 at Princeton University’s School of Public and International Affairs. She taught courses on China, with a focus on the impact of its Belt and Road initiative on international development and economic growth in low- and middle-income countries.

== Selected memberships ==
- Council on Foreign Relations, member
- Truman National Security Project, Security Fellow
- International Center for Non-Profit Law, Board member
- Brookings Institution Project: Leveraging Transparency to Reduce Corruption, Advisory Board member
- Open Government Partnership, former Steering Committee member (2011-2017)
- Open Government Partnership’s Action Network, Envoy
- ICTI Ethical Toy Program, Board member

== Honors and other credentials ==
- In 2011, Goodman received the Herbert Salzman Award for Excellence in International Economic Performance from the U.S. Department of State for her contributions to providing economic stability and security in Afghanistan and Pakistan.
- Goodman is a certified mediator in conflict resolution and is admitted to the bar in Illinois.

== Publications, remarks, and media ==
- High-level Opening Session of the OECD Green Growth and Sustainable Development Forum and Global Forum on Trade (remarks, Oct 2024)
- National Public Radio's All Things Considered: The U.S. has shipped 500 million COVID vaccine doses globally, but there's work ahead (interview, Mar 2022)
- U.N. General Assembly Special Session against corruption: Corruption in the era of COVID-19—an impediment to global health, human rights, and development (event, June 2021)
- National Endowment for Democracy: The Big Question: How Will the COVID-19 Pandemic Affect Transnational Kleptocracy? (interview, Apr 2020)
- Global Forum for Media Development: Proposal: A Tax on Tickets Sales at the “Global Games” (Apr 2019)
- Medium: The future of U.S. open government rests with ‘We the People’ — and it’s time to step up, (co-authored, Feb 2019)
- Devex: USAID adopts a hard line on China's development approach (Sep 2018)
- Open Government Partnership: The 2018 OGP Summit Schedule: The Authoritarian Playbook (event, Jul 2018)
- Open Government Partnership: The 2018 OGP Summit Schedule: Asset Recovery -- How Can Civil Society Effectively Engage? (event, Jul 2018)
- SXSW 2018: The Authoritarian Playbook (event, Mar 2018)
- Mother Jones: Donald Trump Is Making the United States an Anti-Corruption Laughingstock: the nation is losing credibility thanks to the president’s numerous conflicts of interest (Apr 2017)
- Council on Foreign Relations: Corruption and National Security: What Has and Has Not Worked (event, Apr 2017)
- U.S. Agency for International Development: President’s Global Development Council Public Meeting (Oct 2016)
- The Undefeated: Michelle Obama delivers Let Girls Learn message to Africa, Europe (Jun 2016)
- Center for American Progress: An Ounce of Prevention: Building a Global Shield to Defeat Improvised Explosive Devices (Jun 2015)
- Austin Bulldog: Surfing the New Wave: Open Government (Apr 2015)
- Center for American Progress: Tackling Corruption in Afghanistan: It’s Now or Never (Mar 2015)
- Newsweek: How to Halt the Afghan Drug Trade: Follow the Money (Mar 2015)
- Medium: Open Government Progress — The Untold Story (Mar 2015)
- The American Banker: Beneficial Ownership Rules Would Drag Criminals into Daylight (Feb 2015)
- Lithuanian Tribune: Conflicts of the Past Year Connected by Corruption (Jan 2015)
- Newsweek: Tax Evasion: The Noose Tightens Further (Dec 2014)
- Arab Forum on Asset Recovery: Final Report: How to Get Cooperation with Financial Centers on Beneficial Ownership (Nov 2014)
- Think Progress: How War Criminals And Human Rights Violators Exploit U.S. Banks (Oct 2014)
- Congressional Testimony before the Senate Foreign Relations Committee: Hearing on "Jamming the IED Assembly Line: Impeding the Flow of Ammonium Nitrate in South And Central Asia" (Nov 18, 2010)
- New York Times: U.S. Tries to End Flow of Bomb Item to Afghanistan (Nov 2010)
- C-SPAN: Press Conference given by Obama Officials on agricultural assistance programs for Afghanistan, including commentary on economic and security goals (Jan 7, 2010, min 9:59 - 11:22)
- Council on Foreign Relations: The U.S. Special Representative for Afghanistan and Pakistan on U.S. Policy in Afghanistan (event, Dec 2009)
