= Jean-Claude Paye (civil servant) =

French diplomat and jurist

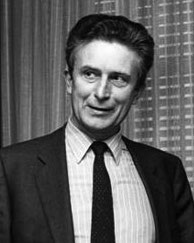
- Paye in 1985

Secretary-General of the Organisation for Economic Co-operation and Development
- In office October 1984 – September 1994
- Preceded by: Emiel van Lennep
- Succeeded by: Staffan Sohlman (acting)
- In office November 1994 – May 1996
- Preceded by: Staffan Sohlman (acting)
- Succeeded by: Don Johnston

Personal details
- Born: 26 August 1934 (age 92)
- Education: National School of Administration

Jean-Claude Paye (born 26 August 1934) is a former French diplomat and civil servant who served as the Secretary-General of the Organisation for Economic Co-operation and Development (OECD) from 1984 to 1996, excluding a brief gap in 1994.

Paye is the son of Lucien Paye, who was Minister of National Education in the 1960s. He attended the National School of Administration. Paye was a highranking official at the Ministry of Foreign Affairs before becoming Secretary-General of the OECD in 1984, in place of Emiel van Lennep of the Netherlands. His ten-year term ended in September 1994 after the United States blocked an extension of his term. However, after further negotiations it was agreed that Paye would stay on for an additional two years before being succeeded by Canada's Don Johnston.
