= Emiel van Lennep =

Dutch diplomat (1915–1996)

His Excellency, Jonkheer Emiel van Lennep
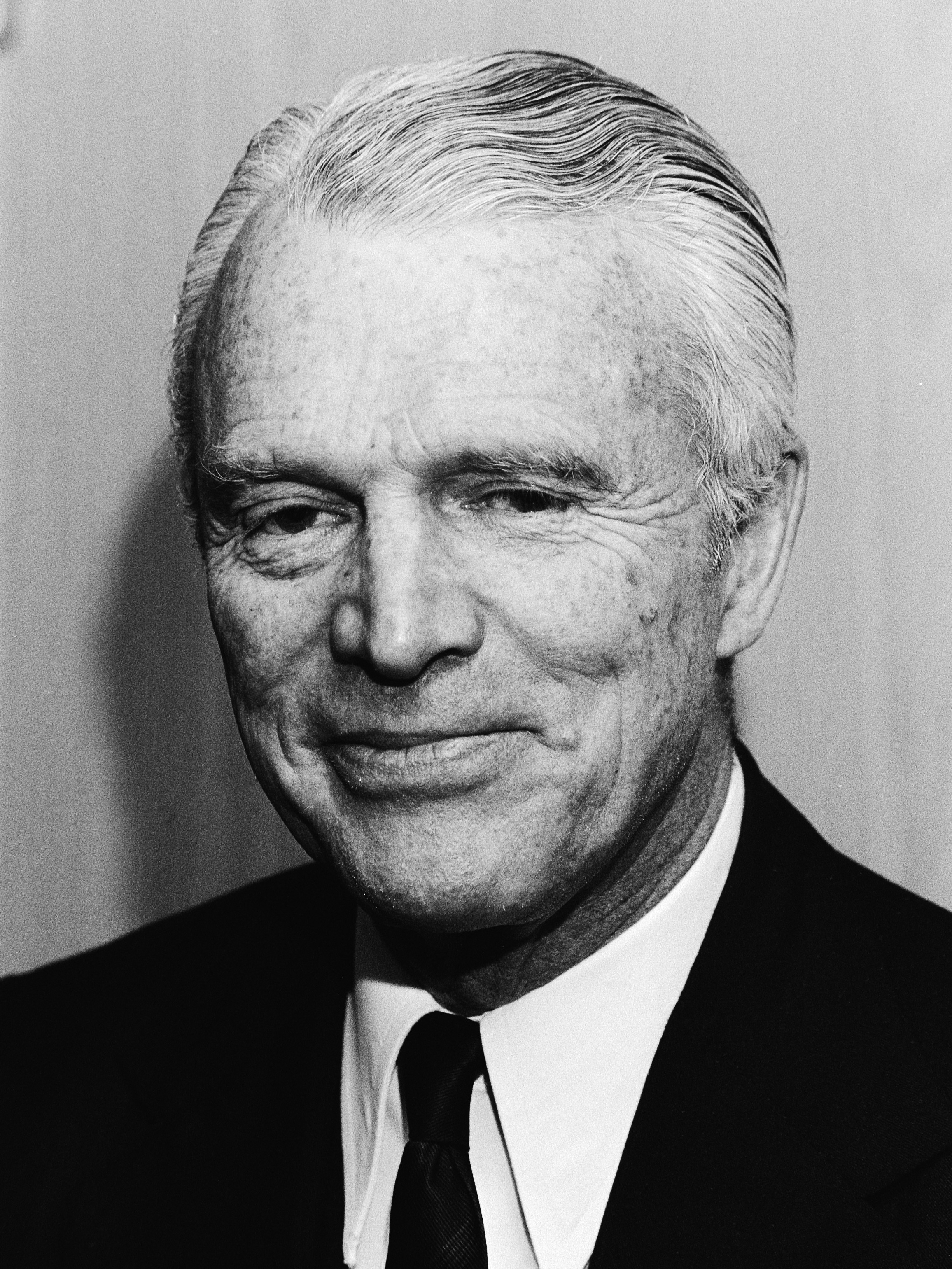
- Van Lennep in 1979

2nd Secretary-General of the OECD
- In office October 1969 – September 1984
- Preceded by: Thorkil Kristensen
- Succeeded by: Jean-Claude Paye

Personal details
- Born: Emile van Lennep; 15 January 1915 Amsterdam, Netherlands
- Died: 2 October 1996 (aged 81) The Hague, Netherlands
- Party: Christian Historical Union
- Education: University of Amsterdam

Jonkheer Emile (Emiel) van Lennep (15 January 1915 – 2 October 1996) was a Dutch official (treasurer general), diplomat and Minister of State.

== Life ==
Van Lennep was born in Amsterdam as a son of Louis Henri van Lennep and Catharina Hildegonda Enschede. He studied law from 1932 to 1937 at the University of Amsterdam.

From 1951 to 1969 he was treasurer general, which is the highest official rank of the Dutch Ministry of Finance. From 1969 to 1984 he was secretary general of the Organisation for Economic Co-operation and Development (OECD).

Van Lennep was instrumental in making the OECD a more effective forum for international cooperation. In the 1970s he was named several times to be a candidate for a function in the government of the Netherlands, but he did not have political aspirations. After his career at the OECD he was appointed to be Minister of State from 1986 until his death in 1996.

In 1987 he was appointed one of the members of a distinguished external panel to conduct a review of the Asian Development Bank. The results of the review were issued in 1989 as the Report of a Panel on the Role of the Asian Development Bank in the 1990s.

He married Alexa Labberton and had two sons and two daughters. In 1990 he was rewarded with a Four Freedoms Award in the category freedom from want. Van Lennep died in 1996 at the age of 81 years.
