= OECD =

Intergovernmental economic organisation

Organisation for Economic Co-operation and Development
- Organisation de coopération et de développements économiques

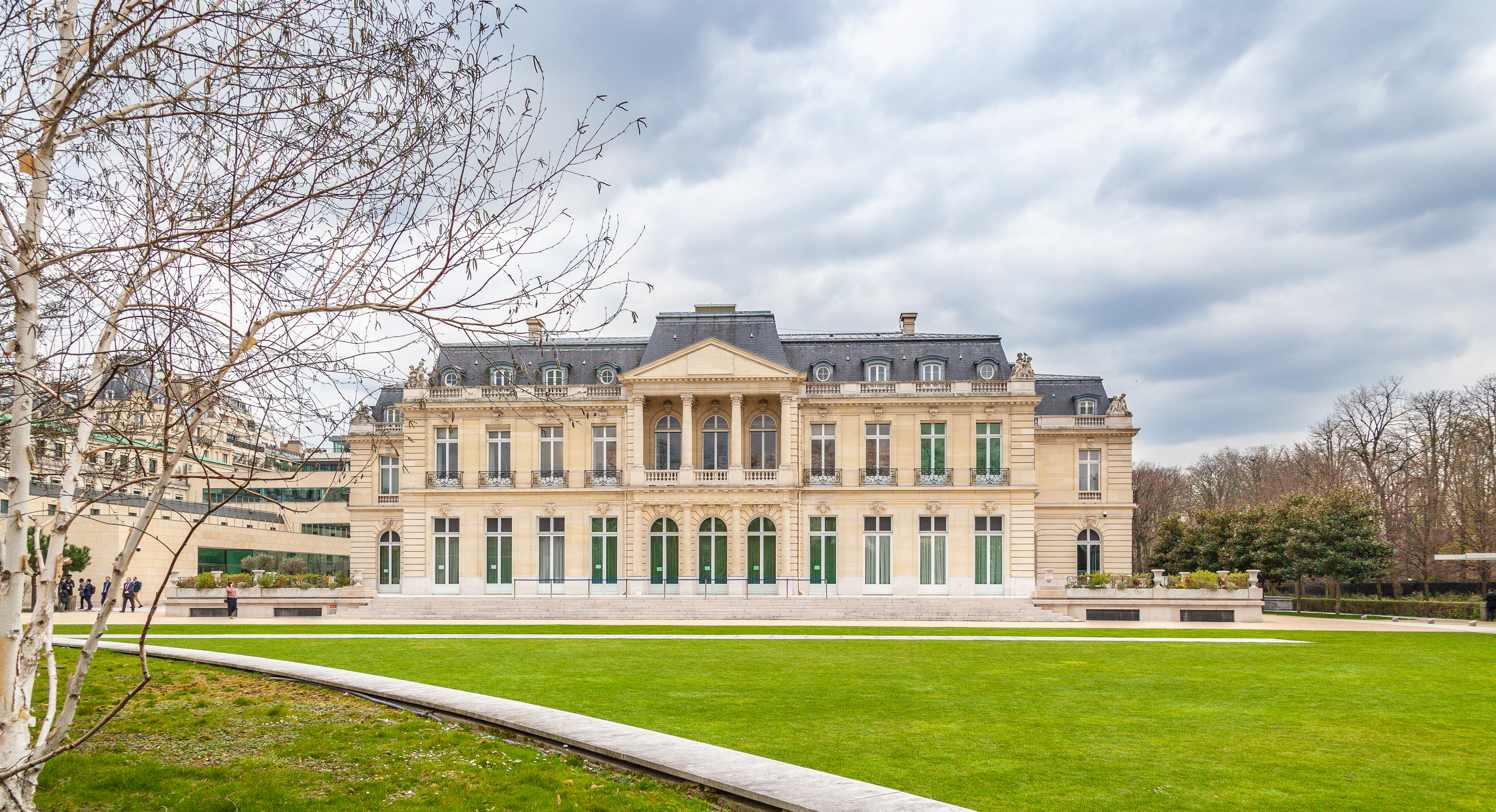
- The Château de la Muette, the headquarters of the OECD in Paris, France

- Member states Applicants
- Abbreviation: OECD; OCDE
- Established: • 16 April 1948 (78 years ago) as OEEC; • 30 September 1961 (65 years ago) as OECD
- Type: Intergovernmental organisation
- Headquarters: Château de la Muette; Paris, France
- Members: 38 countries: Australia; Austria; Belgium; Canada; Chile; Colombia; Costa Rica; Czechia; Denmark; Estonia; Finland; France; Germany; Greece; Hungary; Iceland; Ireland; Israel; Italy; Japan; Latvia; Lithuania; Luxembourg; Mexico; Netherlands; New Zealand; Norway; Poland; Portugal; Slovakia; Slovenia; South Korea; Spain; Sweden; Switzerland; Turkey; United Kingdom; United States
- Official languages: English; French
- Secretary-General: Mathias Cormann
- Deputy Secretaries-General: Yasushi Masaki; František Ružička; Fabrizia Lapecorella; Mary Beth Goodman
- Budget: €903.02 million (US$1.02 billion) (2023)
- Website: OECD.org

The Organisation for Economic Co-operation and Development (OECD; French: Organisation de coopération et de développement économiques, OCDE) is an intergovernmental organisation with 38 member countries. It was founded in 1961 to stimulate economic progress and world trade. The OECD is a forum whose member countries describe themselves as committed to democracy and the market economy, providing a platform for collective problem-solving, analysis, and coordination.

In 2026, their collective population was 1.38 billion people with high levels of human development. As of 2026, OECD member countries collectively comprised 58.4% of global nominal GDP and 38.9% of global GDP at purchasing power parity. The OECD is an official United Nations observer. Member states have strong social security systems. The OECD is headquartered at the Château de la Muette in Paris, France. The OECD is funded by contributions from member countries and publishes annual reports on economic data as well as a variety of evaluations and rankings.

== History ==
=== Organisation for European Economic Co-operation ===
The OECD is the successor organisation to the Organisation for European Economic Co-operation (OEEC), established in April 1948 among the European recipients of Marshall Plan aid for the reconstruction of Europe after World War II. Only Western European states were members of the OEEC, whose primary function was the allocation of American aid. Its Secretaries-General were the Frenchmen Robert Marjolin (1948–1955) and René Sergent (1955–1960). It was headquartered in the Château de la Muette in Paris.

Following the end of Marshall aid in 1952, the OEEC focused on economic issues. Its coordinating role was challenged after the 1957 Rome Treaties establishing the European Economic Community and Euratom. The OEEC provided a framework for negotiations aimed at setting up a European Free Trade Area, to bring the EEC's Inner Six and other OEEC members together on a multilateral basis. In 1958, a European Nuclear Energy Agency was set up in response to Euratom.

By this time, some leading countries felt that the OEEC had outlived its purpose but could be adapted to fulfil a more global mission, which proved to be a cumbersome task. Following several (occasionally unruly) meetings at the Hotel Majestic in Paris, which began in January 1960, a resolution was reached to create a body that would not only solve European and Atlantic economic issues, but also devise policies that could assist less developed countries. This reconstituted organisation would bring the US and Canada, who were already OEEC observers, on board as full members, and the OEEC would set to work straight away on convincing Japan to join the organisation.

=== Founding ===
The Convention on the Organisation for Economic Co-operation and Development was signed on 14 December 1960, and the OECD officially superseded the OEEC in September 1961, consisting of the European founder countries of the OEEC, with the additions of the United States and Canada. Three countries, (the Netherlands, Luxembourg, and Italy)—all OEEC members—ratified the OECD Convention after September 1961, but are nevertheless considered founding members. The official founding members were Austria, Belgium, Canada, Denmark, France, Greece, Iceland, Ireland, Italy, Luxembourg, the Netherlands, Norway, Portugal, Spain, Sweden, Switzerland, Turkey, the United Kingdom, the United States, and West Germany.

Japan became a member in 1964, and over the following decade, Finland, Australia, and New Zealand also joined the organisation. Yugoslavia had observer status in the organisation, starting with the establishment of the OECD, until its dissolution as a country. The OECD also created agencies such as the OECD Development Centre (1961), International Energy Agency (IEA, 1974), and Financial Action Task Force on Money Laundering (FATF).

The aims of the OECD are stated in Article 1 of the Convention as:

1. To achieve the highest sustainable economic growth and employment and a rising standard of living in Member countries, while maintaining financial stability
2. To contribute to sound economic expansion in Member as well as non-member countries
3. To contribute to the expansion of world trade

=== Enlargement to Central Europe ===
Following the Revolutions of 1989, the OECD began assisting countries in Central Europe (especially the Visegrád Group) to prepare market economy reforms. In 1990, the Centre for Co-operation with European Economies in Transition (now succeeded by the Centre for Cooperation with Non-Members) was established, and in 1991, the programme "Partners in Transition" was launched to offer a partnership to Czechoslovakia, Hungary and Poland, including a membership option for these countries. As a result of this, Poland, Hungary, the Czech Republic and Slovakia, as well as South Korea and Mexico, became members of the OECD between 1996 and 2000.

=== Reform and further enlargement ===
East Germany joined on 3 October 1990 through reunification with West Germany. In the 1990s, several European countries, now members of the European Union, expressed their willingness to join the Organisation. In 1995, Cyprus applied for membership, but according to the Cypriot government, it was vetoed by Turkey. In 1996, Estonia, Latvia, and Lithuania signed a Joint Declaration expressing willingness to become members of the OECD, and Slovenia also applied for membership that same year. In 2005, Malta applied to join the Organisation. The EU is lobbying for the admission of all EU member states. Romania reaffirmed in 2012 its intention to become a member of the Organisation through the letter addressed by Romanian Prime Minister Victor Ponta to OECD Secretary-General José Ángel Gurría. In September 2012, the government of Bulgaria confirmed it would apply for membership before the OECD Secretariat.

The OECD established a working group headed by ambassador Seiichiro Noboru to work out a plan for the enlargement with non-members. The working group defined four criteria that must be fulfilled: "like-mindedness", "significant player", "mutual benefit" and "global considerations." The working group's recommendations were presented at the OECD Ministerial Council Meeting on 13 May 2004, and on 16 May 2007, the OECD Ministerial Council decided to open accession discussions with Chile, Estonia, Israel, Russia, and Slovenia, and to strengthen cooperation with Brazil, China, India, Indonesia, and South Africa through a process of enhanced engagement. Chile, Slovenia, Israel, and Estonia all became members in 2010. In March 2014, the OECD halted membership talks with Russia in response to its annexation of Crimea.

In 2013, the OECD decided to open membership talks with Colombia and Latvia. In 2015, the Organisation opened talks with Costa Rica and Lithuania. Latvia became a member on 1 July 2016, and Lithuania soon followed on 5 July 2018. Colombia signed the accession agreement on 30 May 2018 and became a member on 28 April 2020. On 15 May 2020, the OECD decided to extend a formal invitation for Costa Rica to join the OECD, which joined as a member on 25 May 2021.

Other countries that have expressed interest in OECD membership are Argentina, Brazil, Croatia, Malaysia and Peru.

In January 2022, the OECD reported that membership talks were underway with Argentina, Brazil, Bulgaria, Croatia, Peru and Romania.

In March 2022, the OECD suspended the participation of Russia and Belarus due to the ongoing Russian invasion of Ukraine.

In June 2022, during the annual OECD Ministerial Council Meeting, the Roadmaps for the Accession to the OECD Convention for Brazil, Bulgaria, Croatia, Peru and Romania were adopted. In March 2024, the Roadmaps for the Accession to the OECD were adopted with Argentina and Indonesia, and in July 2024, also with Thailand.

== Objectives and issues ==
=== Multilateral Surveillance ===
The OECD conducts multilateral surveillance as part of its economic monitoring and policy co-ordination activities among member countries. This function has developed through regular peer reviews, comparative analysis, and policy assessments carried out within the framework of the Organisation's committees and its Economics Department.

=== Taxation ===
The OECD sets the rules governing international taxation for multinationals through the OECD Transfer Pricing Guidelines for Multinational Enterprises and Tax Administrations, a Model Tax Convention and country-by-country reporting rules.

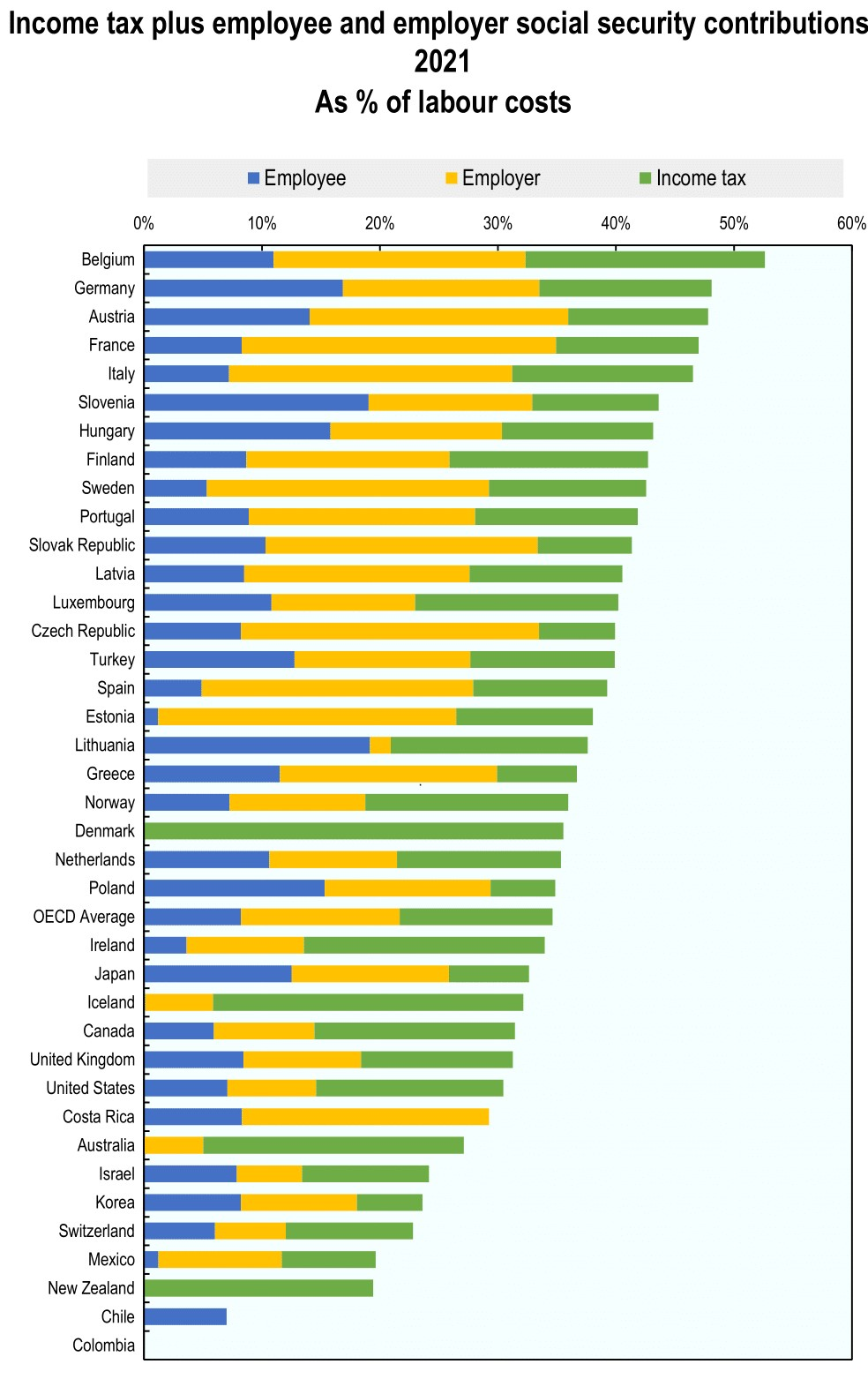
Payroll and income tax by OECD country

The OECD publishes and updates a model tax convention that serves as a template for allocating taxation rights between countries. This model is accompanied by a set of commentaries that reflect OECD-level interpretation of the content of the model convention provisions. In general, this model allocates the primary right to tax to the country from which capital investment originates (i.e., the home, or resident country) rather than the country in which the investment is made (the host, or source country). As a result, it is most effective between two countries with reciprocal investment flows (such as among the OECD member countries), but can be unbalanced when one of the signatory countries is economically weaker than the other (such as between OECD and non-OECD pairings). Additionally, the OECD has published and updated the Transfer Pricing Guidelines since 1995. The Transfer Pricing Guidelines serve as a template for the profit allocation of inter-company transactions to countries.

Pillar 1

An OECD proposal to allocate multinational profits (for taxing purposes) to countries where they do business, by a formula, including to markets which multinationals sell into without a physical presence. This is hoped to eliminate the need for Digital Services Tax implemented by several countries, including France. There are exclusions and minimum thresholds, including banking and extractive industries. The proposal involves allocating only residual profit (i.e., profits above what is established through transfer pricing, thus creating a hybrid mechanism). This is essentially no change to what is currently allowed (routine profits allocated using transfer pricing + residual profits allocated through profit split).

Pillar 2

On 1 July 2021, finance officials from 130 countries agreed on plans for a new international taxation policy known as the global minimum corporate tax (of 15%). If a country taxes a multinational at a lower rate, the multinational's HQ will receive the difference.

All the major economies agreed to pass national laws that would require corporations to pay at least 15% income tax in the countries they operate. This new policy would end the practice of locating world headquarters in small countries with very low taxation rates. Governments hope to recoup some of the lost revenue, estimated at $100 billion to $240 billion each year. The new system was promoted by the Biden Administration in the United States and the OECD. Secretary-General Mathias Cormann of the OECD said, "This historic package will ensure that large multinational companies pay their fair share of tax everywhere."

=== Multinational corporations ===
The OECD Guidelines for Multinational Enterprises are a set of legally non-binding guidelines attached as an annexe to the OECD Declaration on International Investment and Multinational Enterprises. They are recommendations providing principles and standards for responsible business conduct for multinational corporations operating in or from countries adhering to the Declaration.

== Publications ==
The OECD publishes books, reports, statistics, working papers, and reference materials. All titles and databases published since 1998 can be accessed via OECD.org. The OECD Library & Archives collection dates from 1947, including records from the Committee for European Economic Co-operation (CEEC) and the Organisation for European Economic Co-operation (OEEC), predecessors of today's OECD. External researchers can consult OECD publications and archival material on the OECD premises by appointment.

=== Books ===
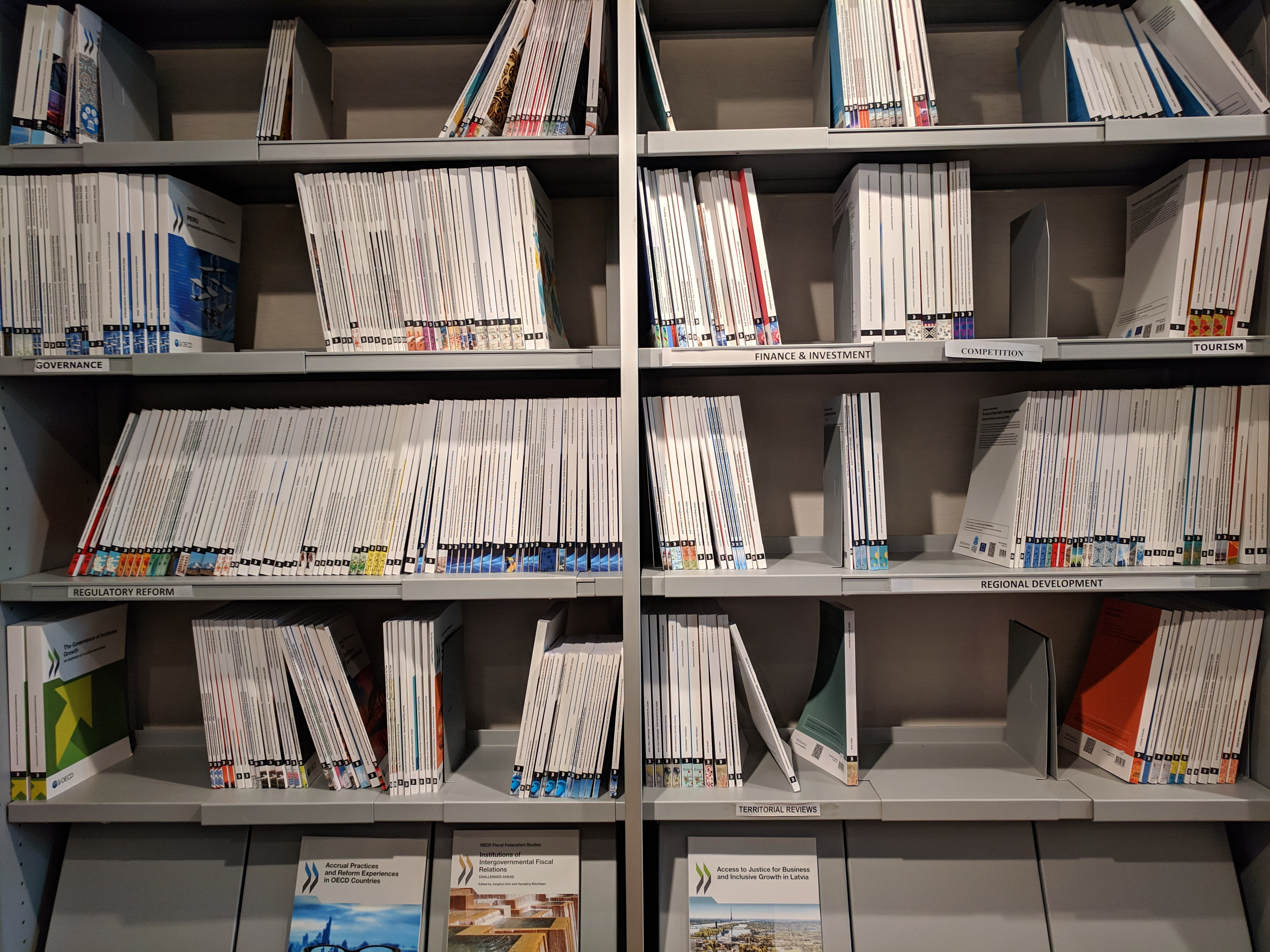
Reports on a wide range of topics for sale at the OECD's Conference Centre Bookshop in 2019

The OECD releases about 600 books and over 400 papers yearly on topics spanning public policy. The publications are updated to the OECD.org. Most books are published in English and French. The OECD flagship titles include:

- The OECD Economic Outlook, published twice a year, with interim updates. It provides analysis and forecasts of major short-term global economic trends including for GDP growth, inflation and labour market developments across member and selected partner countries. The OECD Economic Outlook helps policymakers assess near-term economic prospects, risks and policy options.
- The Main Economic Indicators, published monthly. It contains a large selection of timely statistical indicators.
- The OECD Communications Outlook and the OECD Internet Economy Outlook (formerly the Information Technology Outlook), which rotate every year. They contain forecasts and analysis of the communications and information technology industries in OECD member countries and non-member economies.
- In 2007 the OECD published Human Capital: How what you know shapes your life, the first book in the OECD Insights series. This series uses OECD analysis and data to introduce important social and economic issues to non-specialist readers. Other books in the series cover sustainable development, international trade and international migration. The series was discontinued in 2017.

All OECD books are available on www.OECD.org.

=== Magazine ===
OECD Observer, an award-winning magazine, (Note: Highly Commended certificate in the annual ALPSP/Charlesworth awards from the Association of Learned and Professional Society Publishers 2002; see article .) was launched in 1962. The magazine appeared six times a year until 2010, and became quarterly in 2011 with the introduction of the OECD Yearbook, launched for the 50th anniversary of the organisation. The online and mobile editions contained news, analysis, reviews, commentaries and data on global economic, social and environmental challenges and listings of the latest OECD books. An OECD Observer Crossword was introduced in Q2 2013. The OECD Observer was last issued in the fourth quarter of 2019, with a double edition looking ahead at artificial intelligence, and a cover leading on why statistical offices should hire a comedian. The OECD Observer website closed in the first quarter of 2021; the archive can be consulted at www.oecd.org.

=== Statistics ===
The OECD is known as a statistical agency, as it publishes comparable statistics on numerous subjects. In July 2014, the OECD publicly released its main statistical databases through the OECD Data Portal, an online platform that allows visitors to create custom charts based on official OECD indicators.

OECD statistics are available in several forms:

- as interactive charts on the OECD Data Portal,
- as interactive databases on iLibrary together with key comparative and country tables,
- as static files or dynamic database views on the OECD Statistics portal,
- as StatLinks (in most OECD books, there is a URL that links to the underlying data).

In July 2024, the OECD announced that it "has transitioned to [an] open-access information model" and that Creative Commons CC‑BY‑4.0 attribution licences will be used on all data and publications.

=== Papers ===
OECD directorates publish a wide range of working papers and policy papers covering various topics, including economics, education, development, statistics and more. Papers are accessible via the OECD working and policy papers search page.

=== Reference works ===
The OECD is responsible for the OECD Guidelines for the Testing of Chemicals, a continuously updated document that is a de facto standard (i.e., soft law).

It published the OECD Environmental Outlook to 2030 in March 2008, which argues that tackling key environmental problems—including climate change, biodiversity loss, water scarcity, and the health impacts of pollution—is both achievable and affordable.

== Structure ==
The OECD's structure consists of three main elements:

- The OECD member countries, each represented by a delegation led by an ambassador. Together, they form the OECD Council. Member countries act collectively through the council (and its standing committees) to provide direction and guidance to the work of the organisation.
- The OECD substantive committees, one for each work area of the OECD, plus their various subsidiary bodies. Committee members are typically subject-matter experts from member and non-member governments. The committees oversee all the work on each theme (publications, task forces, conferences, and so on). Committee members then relay the conclusions to their capitals.
- The OECD Secretariat, led by the Secretary-General (currently Mathias Cormann), provides support to standing and substantive committees. It is organised into directorates, which include about 2,500 staff.

=== Meetings ===
The main entrance to the OECD Conference Centre in Paris

Delegates from the member countries attend committee and other meetings. Former Deputy Secretary-General Pierre Vinde estimated in 1997 that the cost borne by the member countries, such as sending their officials to OECD meetings and maintaining permanent delegations, is equivalent to the cost of running the secretariat.

The OECD regularly holds minister-level meetings and forums as platforms for a discussion on a broad spectrum of thematic issues relevant to the OECD charter, member countries, and non-member countries.

Noteworthy meetings include:

- The yearly Ministerial Council Meeting, with the Ministers of Economy of all member countries and the candidates for enhanced engagement among the countries.
- The annual OECD Forum, which brings together leaders from business, government, labour, civil society and international organisations. Held every year since June 2000, the OECD Forum takes the form of conferences and discussions, is open to public participation and is held in conjunction with the MCM.
- Thematic Ministerial Meetings, held among ministers of a given domain (i.e., all Ministers of Labour, all Ministers of Environment, etc.).
- The bi-annual World Forum on Statistics, Knowledge and Policies, which does not usually take place in the OECD. This series of meetings has the ambition to measure and foster progress in societies.
- The Forum for Harmful Tax Practices
- OECD Eurasia Week, which includes several high-level policy dialogue discussions to share best practices and experiences in addressing common development and economic challenges in Eurasia.

=== Secretariat ===
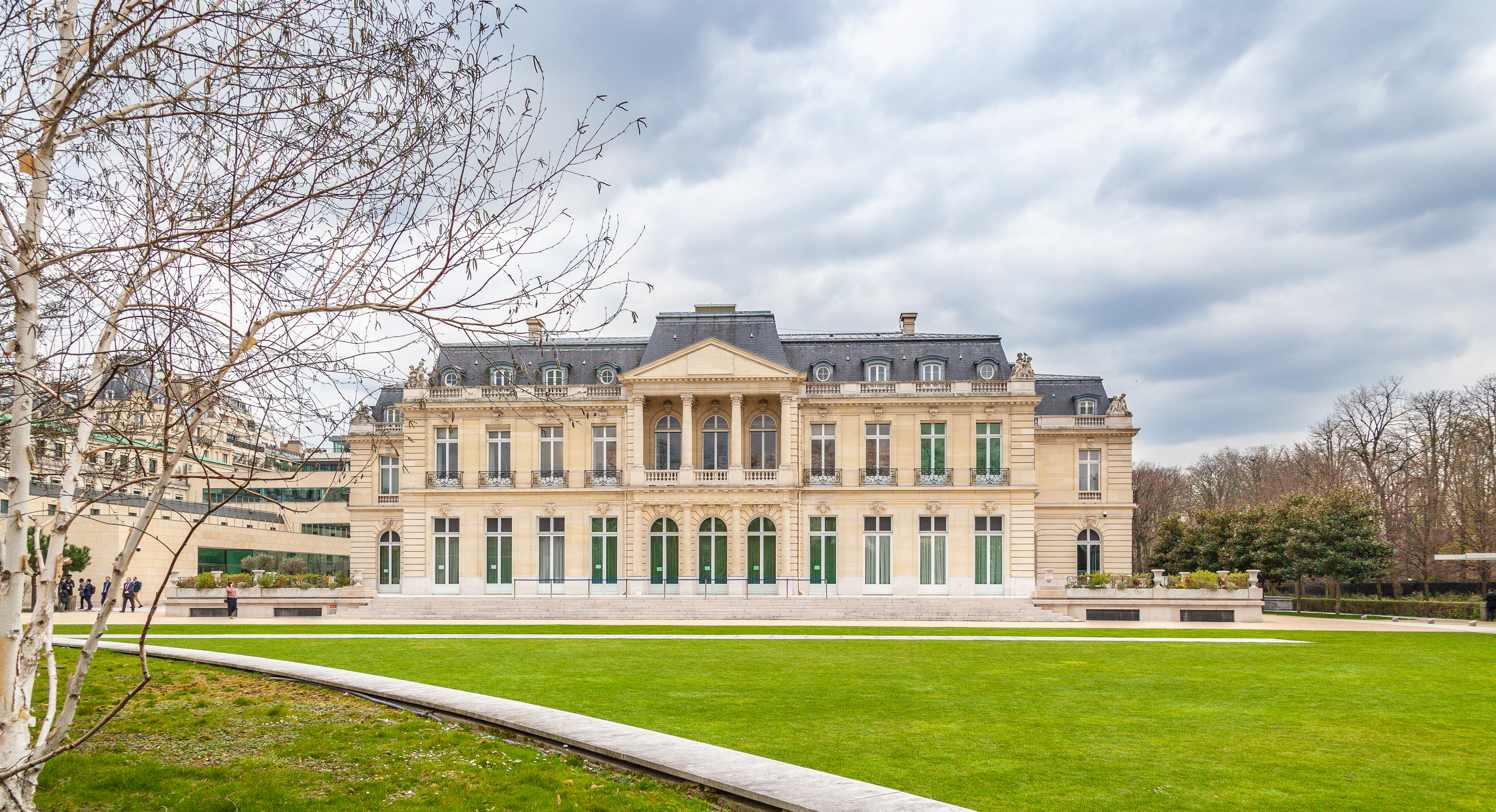
The exterior of the Château de la Muette and the grounds of the OECD Conference Centre

Exchanges between OECD governments benefit from the information, analysis, and preparation of the OECD Secretariat. The secretariat collects data, monitors trends, and analyses and forecasts economic developments. Under the direction and guidance of member governments, it also researches social changes or evolving patterns in trade, environment, education, agriculture, technology, taxation and other areas.

The secretariat is organised in directorates:

- Centre for Entrepreneurship, SMEs, Regions and Cities
- Centre for Tax Policy and Administration
- Development Co-operation Directorate
- Directorate for Education and Skills
- Directorate for Employment, Labour, and Social Affairs
- Directorate for Financial and Enterprise Affairs
- Directorate for Science, Technology, and Innovation
- Economics Department
- Environment Directorate
- Public Governance Directorate
- Statistics Directorate
- Trade and Agriculture Directorate
- General Secretariat
- Executive Directorate
- Directorate for Communications

=== Secretary-General ===
The head of the OECD Secretariat and chair of the OECD Council is the Secretary-General. Secretary-General selections are made by consensus, meaning all member states must agree on a candidate.

Secretary-General of the OEEC
No.	Portrait	Name (born–died)	Term of office			Country	Ref.
No.	Portrait	Name (born–died)	Took office	Left office	Time in office	Country	Ref.
1		Robert Marjolin (1911–1986)	1948	1955	6–7 years	France	
2		René Sergent (1904–1984)	1955	1960	4–5 years	France	
3		Thorkil Kristensen (1899–1989)	1960	30 September 1961	0–1 years	Denmark	

Secretary-General of the OECD
No.	Portrait	Name (born–died)	Term of office			Country	Ref.
No.	Portrait	Name (born–died)	Took office	Left office	Time in office	Country	Ref.
1		Thorkil Kristensen (1899–1989)	30 September 1961	30 September 1969	8 years, 0 days	Denmark	
2		Emiel van Lennep (1915–1996)	1 October 1969	30 September 1984	14 years, 365 days	Netherlands	
3		Jean-Claude Paye (born 1934)	1 October 1984	30 September 1994	9 years, 364 days	France	
—		Staffan Sohlman (1937–2017) acting	1 October 1994	30 November 1994	60 days	Sweden	
3		Jean-Claude Paye (born 1934)	30 November 1994	31 May 1996	1 year, 183 days	France	
4		Donald Johnston (1936–2022)	1 June 1996	31 May 2006	9 years, 364 days	Canada	
5		José Ángel Gurría (born 1950)	1 June 2006	31 May 2021	14 years, 364 days	Mexico	
6		Mathias Cormann (born 1970)	1 June 2021	Incumbent	5 years, 169 days	Australia/Belgium	

=== OECD Chief Economist ===
British economist Christopher Dow served as Chief Economist of the OECD from its establishment until 1973.

In 1980, Canadian economist Sylvia Ostry became the first woman to be appointed OECD Chief Economist, holding the position until 1983.

In 1992, Kumiharu Shigehara, former Chief Economist of the Bank of Japan, became the first individual from outside the English-speaking world to be appointed OECD Chief Economist. At the time of his appointment, the Financial Times, in an article entitled "Japan’s Turn" (22 January 1992), described him as exemplifying a new generation of Japanese figures characterised by self-confidence, strong international awareness, and a willingness to express their views openly.

In February 2026, Italian Stefano Scarpetta was announced as the next Chief Economist. Scarpetta used to lead the Directorate's work on employment, migration and health.

Chief Economists of the OECD
No.	Portrait	Name (born–died)	Term of office		Country	Ref.
No.	Portrait	Name (born–died)	Took office	Left office	Country	Ref.
1		Christopher Dow (1916–1998)	September 1963	1973	(United Kingdom) UK	
2		Fred Atkinson (1919–2018)	April 1973	April 1975	(United Kingdom) UK	
3		John Fay	April 1975	December 1979	France	
4		Sylvia Ostry (1927–2020)	January 1980	August 1983	Canada	
5		David Henderson (1927–2018)	January 1984	April 1992	(United Kingdom) UK	
6		Kumiharu Shigehara (born 1939)	May 1992	May 1997	Japan	
7		Ignazio Visco (born 1949)	August 1997	August 2002	Italy	
8		Jean-Philippe Cotis (1957–2023)	August 2002	October 2007	France	
–		Jorgen Elmeskov (born 1956) acting	October 2007 April 2009	September 2008 December 2009	Denmark	
9		Klaus Schmidt-Hebbel (born 1955)	September 2008	April 2009	Germany Chile	
10		Pier Carlo Padoan (born 1950)	December 2009	February 2014	Italy	
–		Rintaro Tamaki (born 1953) acting	February 2014	October 2014	Japan	
11		Catherine L. Mann	October 2014	December 2017	(United States) US	
12		Laurence Boone (born 1969)	July 2018	July 2022	France	
13		Claire Lombardelli	May 2023	May 2024	(United Kingdom) UK	
– 14		Álvaro S. Pereira (born 1972) acting before 2024	January 2018 July 2022 June 2024	July 2018 April 2023 September 2025	Portugal	
15		Stefano Scarpetta (born 1963)	April 2026	Incumbent	Italy	

=== Committees ===
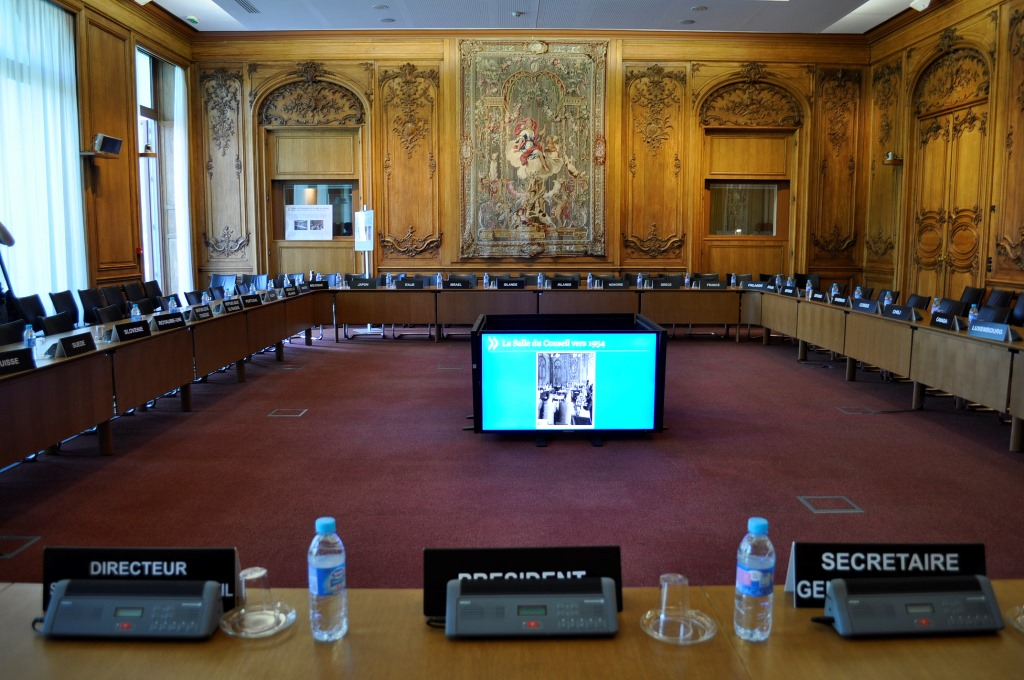
A meeting room in the Château de la Muette

Representatives of member and observer countries meet in specialised committees on specific policy areas, such as economics, trade, science, employment, education, development assistance or financial markets. There are about 200 committees, working groups and expert groups. Committees discuss policies and review progress in the given policy area.

=== Special bodies ===
The OECD has a number of specialised bodies:

- Africa Partnership Forum
- Blue Dot Network
- Business and Industry Advisory Committee (BIAC)
- Development Assistance Committee
- OECD Development Centre
- International Transport Forum (ITF) (formerly known as the European Conference of Ministers of Transport)
- International Energy Agency
- Nuclear Energy Agency
- Multilateral Organisation Performance Assessment Network (MOPAN)
- Partnership for Democratic Governance (PDG)
- Sahel and West Africa Club
- Trade Union Advisory Committee to the OECD (TUAC)

== Voting ==
OECD decisions are made through voting, which requires unanimity among all of those voting. Each member country has one vote. However, dissenting members which do not wish to block a decision but merely to signal their disapproval can abstain from voting. 22 of the OECD member countries are also EU member states.

== Member countries ==
=== Current members ===
As of May 2021 there are 38 members of the OECD:

Country	Application	Negotiations	Invitation	Membership	Geographic location	Notes
Australia				7 June 1971	Oceania	
Austria				29 September 1961	Europe	OEEC member
Belgium				13 September 1961	Europe	OEEC member
Canada				10 April 1961	North America	
Chile	November 2003	16 May 2007	15 December 2009	7 May 2010	South America	
Colombia	24 January 2011	30 May 2013	25 May 2018	28 April 2020	South America	
Costa Rica	9 April 2015		15 May 2020	25 May 2021	Central America	
Czech Republic	January 1994	8 June 1994	24 November 1995	21 December 1995	Europe	
Denmark				30 May 1961	Europe	OEEC member
Estonia		16 May 2007	10 May 2010	9 December 2010	Europe	
Finland				28 January 1969	Europe	
France				7 August 1961	Europe	OEEC member
Germany				27 September 1961	Europe	Joined OECD and OEEC in 1949 as West Germany, previously represented by the Trizone
Greece				27 September 1961	Europe	OEEC member
Hungary	December 1993	8 June 1994		7 May 1996	Europe	
Iceland				5 June 1961	Europe	OEEC member
Ireland				17 August 1961	Europe	OEEC member
Israel	15 March 2004	16 May 2007	10 May 2010	7 September 2010	Middle East	
Italy				29 March 1962	Europe	OEEC member
Japan	November 1962		July 1963	28 April 1964	Asia	
Latvia		29 May 2013	11 May 2016	1 July 2016	Europe	
Lithuania		9 April 2015	31 May 2018	5 July 2018	Europe	
Luxembourg				7 December 1961	Europe	OEEC member
Mexico			14 April 1994	18 May 1994	North America	
Netherlands				13 November 1961	Europe	OEEC member
New Zealand				29 May 1973	Oceania	
Norway				4 July 1961	Europe	OEEC member
Poland	1 February 1994	8 June 1994	11 July 1996	22 November 1996	Europe	
Portugal				4 August 1961	Europe	OEEC member
Slovakia	February 1994	8 June 1994	July 2000	14 December 2000	Europe	
Slovenia	March 1996	16 May 2007	10 May 2010	21 July 2010	Europe	
South Korea	29 March 1995		25 October 1996	12 December 1996	Asia	
Spain				3 August 1961	Europe	Joined OEEC in 1958
Sweden				28 September 1961	Europe	OEEC member
Switzerland				28 September 1961	Europe	OEEC member
Turkey				2 August 1961	Eurasia	OEEC member
United Kingdom				2 May 1961	Europe	OEEC member
United States				12 April 1961	North America	

=== Dependent territories ===
- Aruba
- Bermuda
- Curaçao
- Gibraltar
- Guernsey
- Isle of Man
- Jersey
- Sint Maarten

Dependent territories of member states are not members in their own right, but may have membership as part of their sovereign state. As of January 2021, the Dutch Caribbean and the British territories of Guernsey, Jersey, the Isle of Man, Gibraltar, and Bermuda are included as part of the OECD memberships of the Netherlands and the UK, respectively. Other dependent territories of OECD member states are not members of the OECD.

=== Participating partners ===
- Brazil
- China
- European Union
- India
- Indonesia
- South Africa

The European Commission participates in the work of the OECD alongside the EU member states. The OECD designates Brazil, China, India, Indonesia, and South Africa as Key Partners, which participate in policy discussions in OECD bodies, and take part in regular OECD surveys.

=== Negotiating membership ===
- Argentina since 2022
- Brazil since 2022
- Bulgaria since 2022
- Croatia since 2022
- Indonesia since 2024
- Peru since 2022
- Romania since 2022
- Thailand since 2024

=== Applicants ===
- Malta applied in 2007
- Ukraine since 2022

=== Expressed interest ===
- Kazakhstan
- Malaysia
- Vietnam
- Dominican Republic

=== Former members ===
- Free Territory of Trieste

The Free Territory of Trieste (Zone A) was a member of the OEEC until 1954, when it merged with Italy and ceased to exist as an independent territorial entity.

=== Accession talks terminated ===
- Belarus
- Russia

In May 2007, the OECD decided to open accession negotiations with Russia. In March 2014, the OECD halted membership talks in response to Russia's role in that year's Crimean annexation and continuous human and civil rights abuses. On 25 February 2022, the OECD terminated the accession process with Russia after it invaded Ukraine. In March 2022, Russia and Belarus were suspended from any participation in the OECD.

=== Application vetoed ===
- Cyprus

In 1995, Cyprus applied to join the OECD. The application was vetoed by Turkey and continues to be vetoed since. Turkey vetoed Cyprus' participation in the OECD's survey of Teachers, Teaching and Learning in December 2005 and again in April 2006 in the OECD's Programme on Educational Building and the survey Programme for International Student Assessment, as well as in the participation of Cyprus (as an observer) in the OECD's Committee on Statistics. Given the fact that in order to become a member of the International Energy Agency, Cyprus has to become a member of the OECD, its participation in the IEA is prevented by the Turkish veto.

== Budget ==
The OECD operates on a two-year budget determined by member countries, with annual revenues over €900 million during the most recent reporting period (2023–2024).

Totalling an estimated €229.9 million in 2024, assessed contributions to the "Part I Budget" are the largest single source of revenue for the OECD and these contributions are based on both the number of OECD members and the proportional size of their national economies.

2024 Part I budget contribution shares
Member country	% contribution
Australia	3.3
Austria	1.5
Belgium	1.7
Canada	3.8
Chile	1.2
Colombia	1.2
Costa Rica	0.9
Czech Republic	1.2
Denmark	1.4
Estonia	0.8
Finland	1.2
France	5.8
Germany	7.6
Greece	1.1
Hungary	1.0
Iceland	0.6
Ireland	1.4
Israel	1.5
Italy	3.9
Japan	8.5
South Korea	3.5
Latvia	0.8
Lithuania	0.9
Luxembourg	0.8
Mexico	2.7
Netherlands	2.4
New Zealand	1.2
Norway	1.6
Poland	1.7
Portugal	1.2
Slovakia	1.0
Slovenia	0.9
Spain	2.9
Sweden	1.7
Switzerland	2.1
Turkey	1.9
United Kingdom	5.5
United States	18.3
Total	100.0

== Permanent missions accredited to the OECD ==
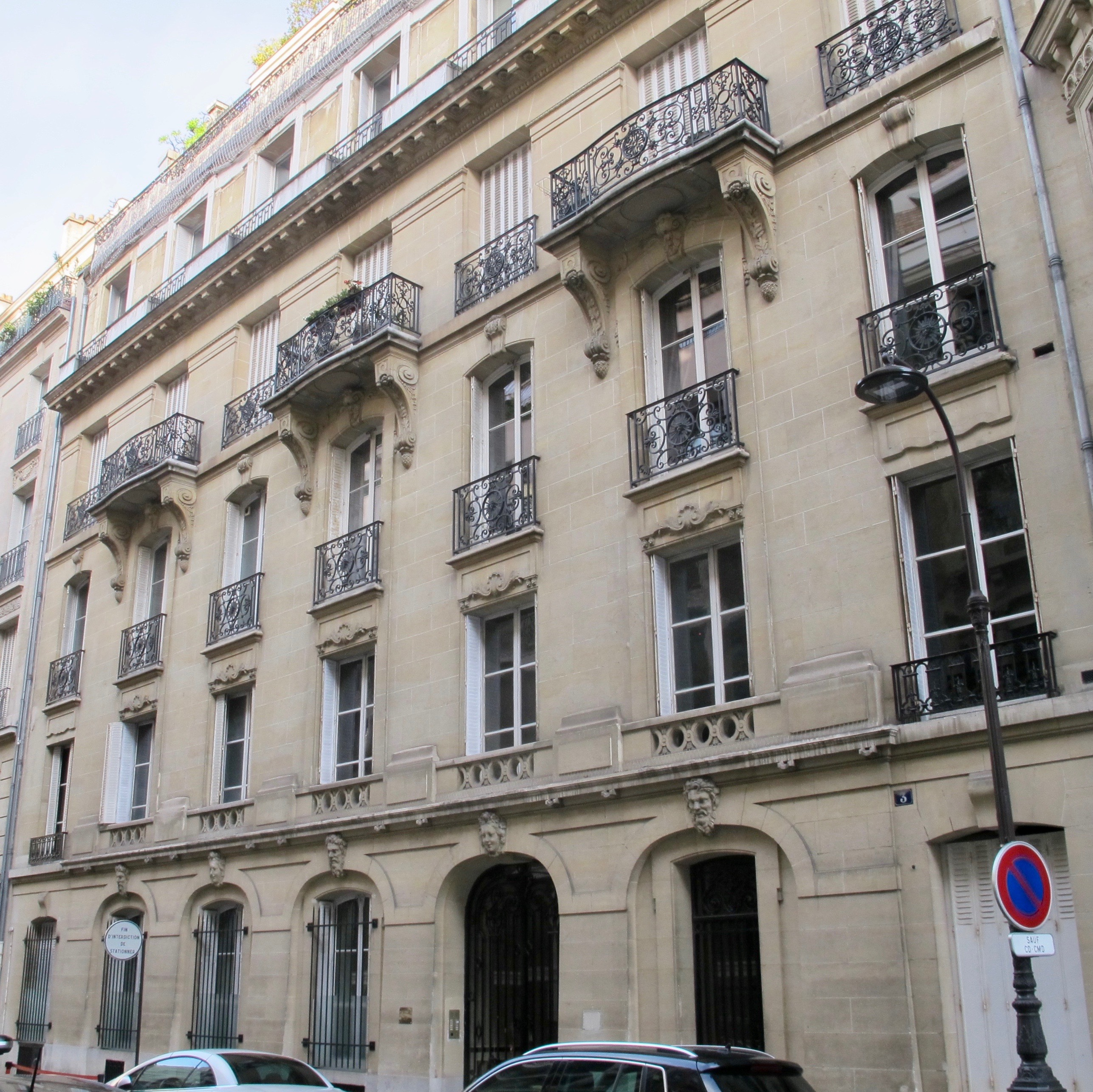
Permanent Mission of Austria to the OECD

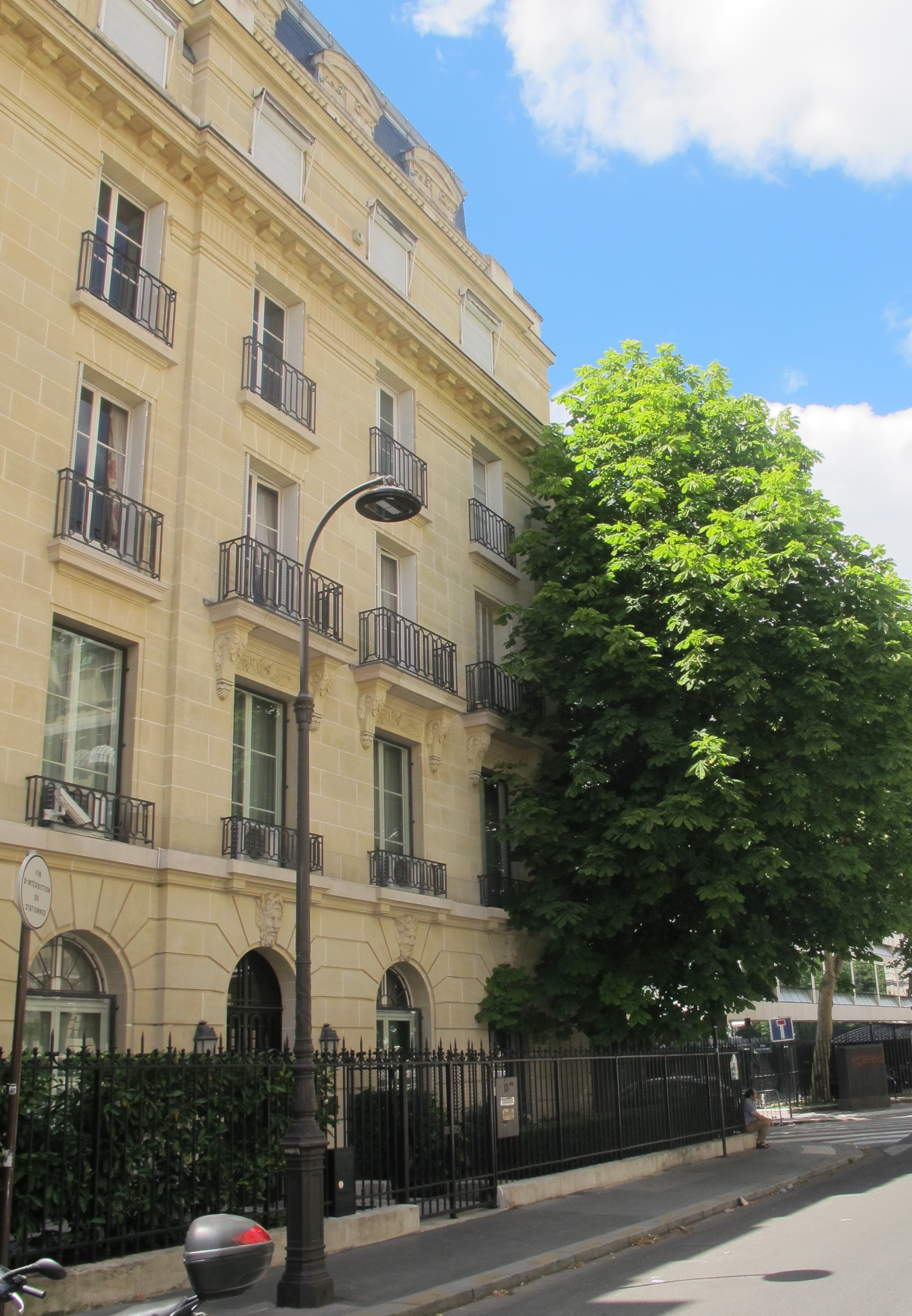
Permanent Mission of Canada to the OECD

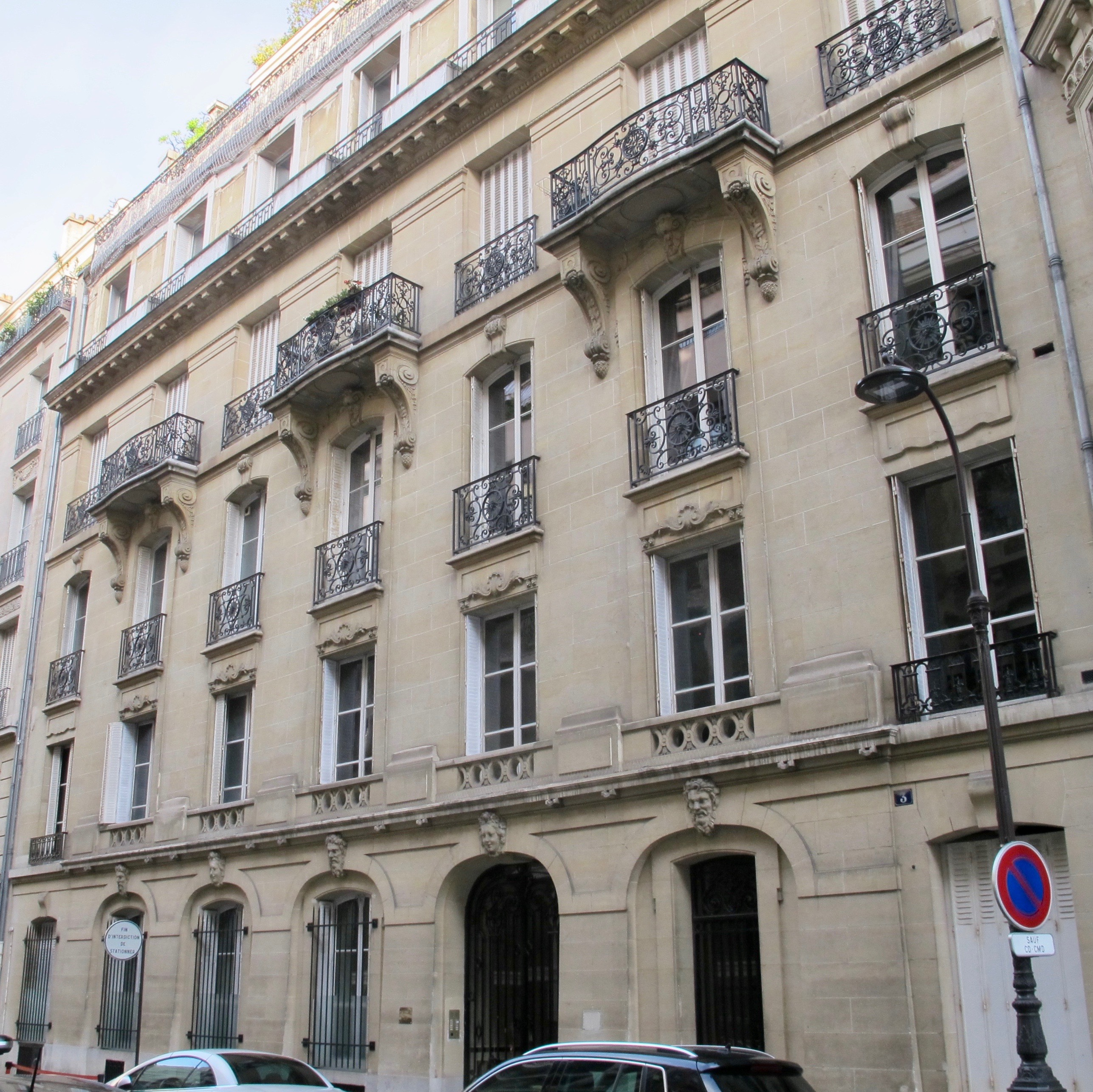
Permanent Mission of Chile to the OECD

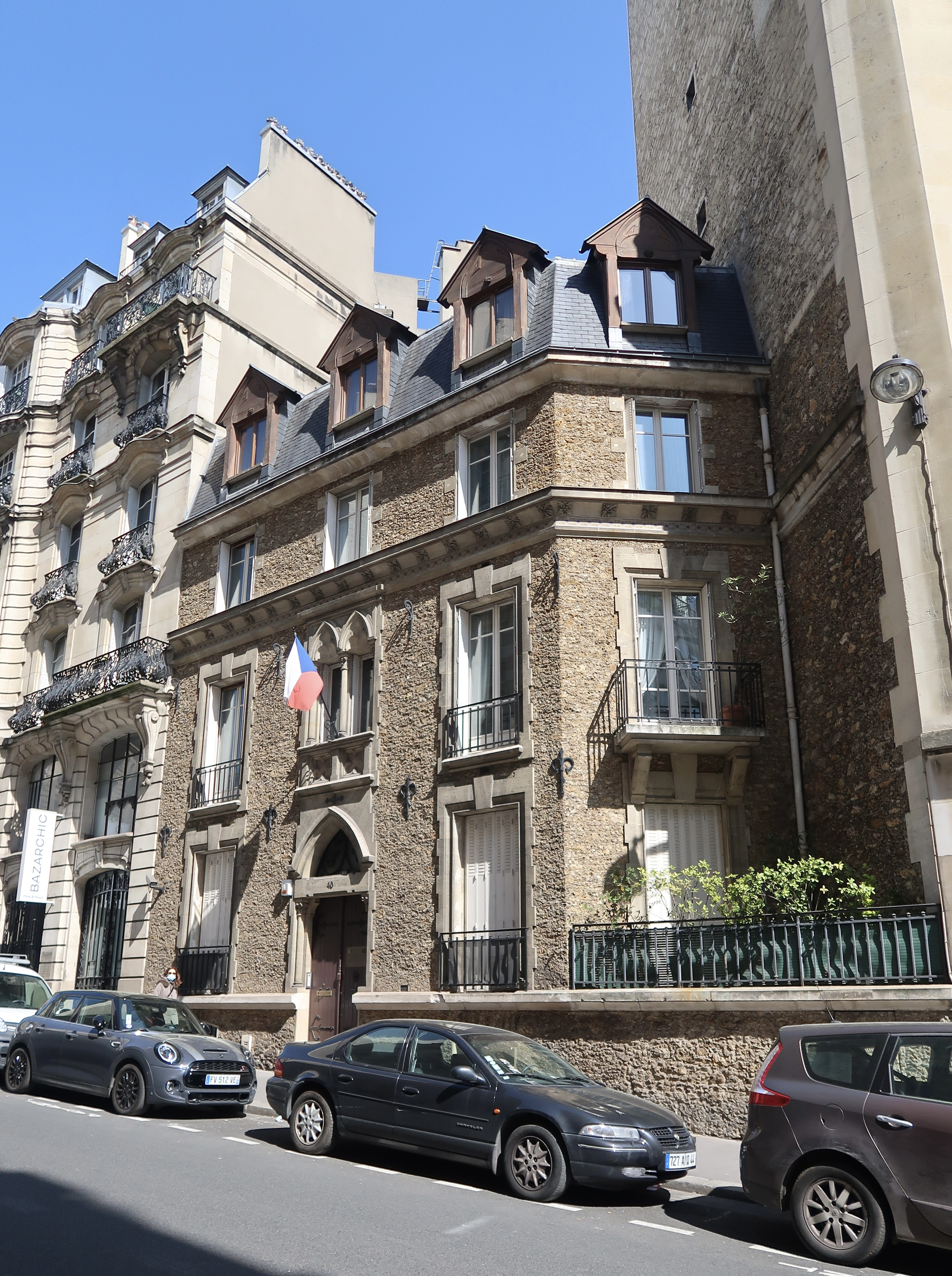
Permanent Mission of the Czech Republic to the OECD

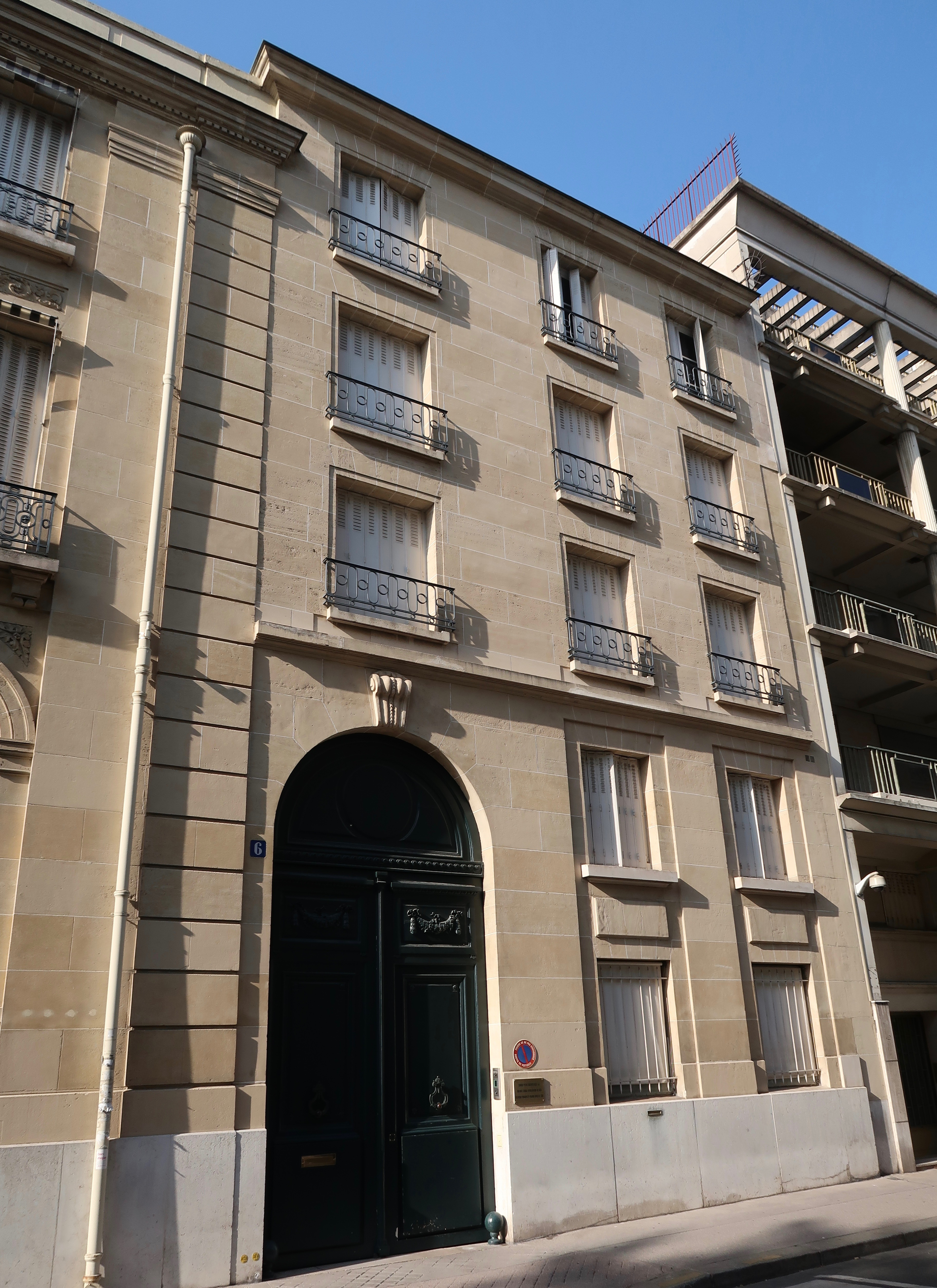
Permanent Mission of Finland to the OECD

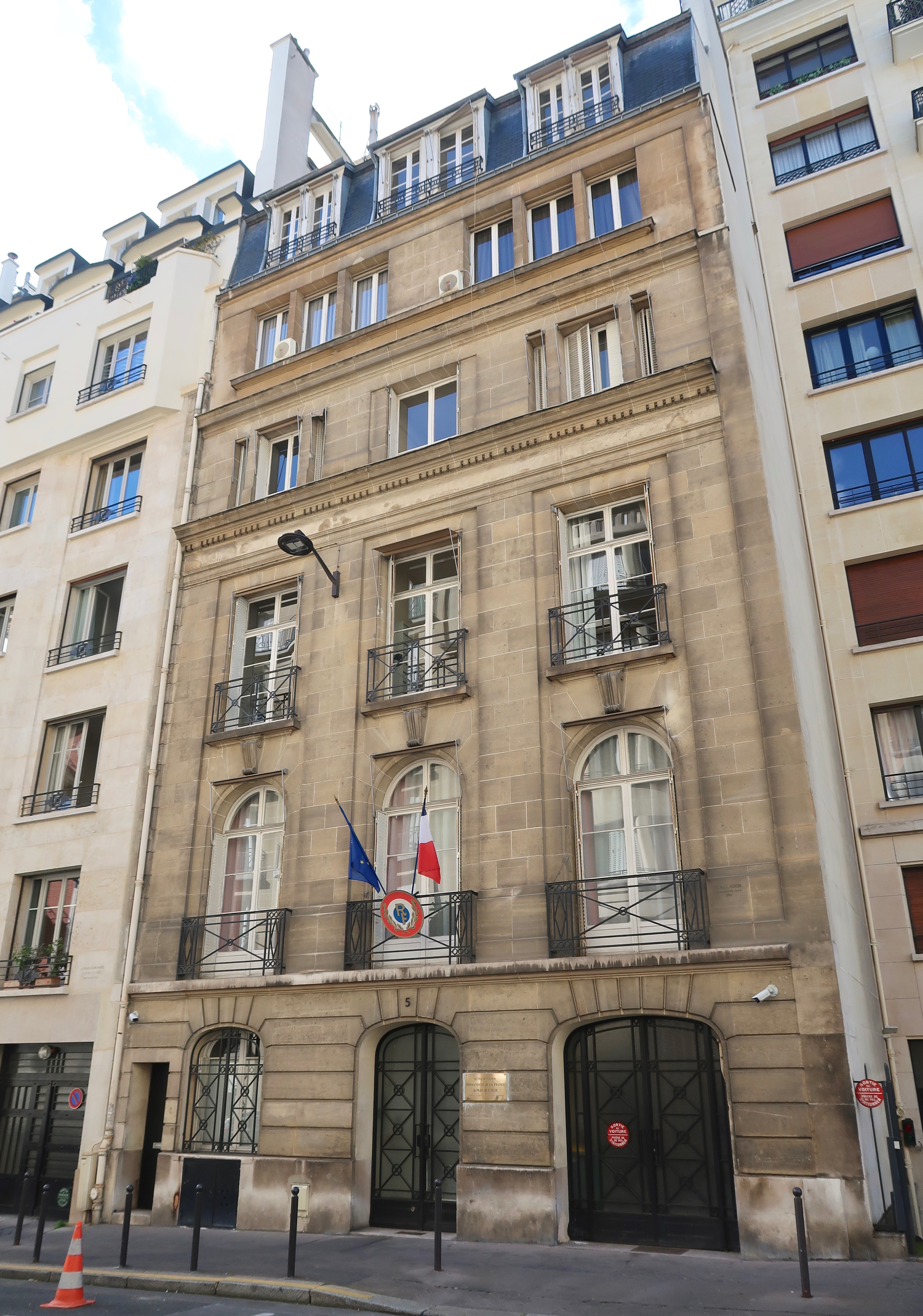
Permanent Mission of France to the OECD

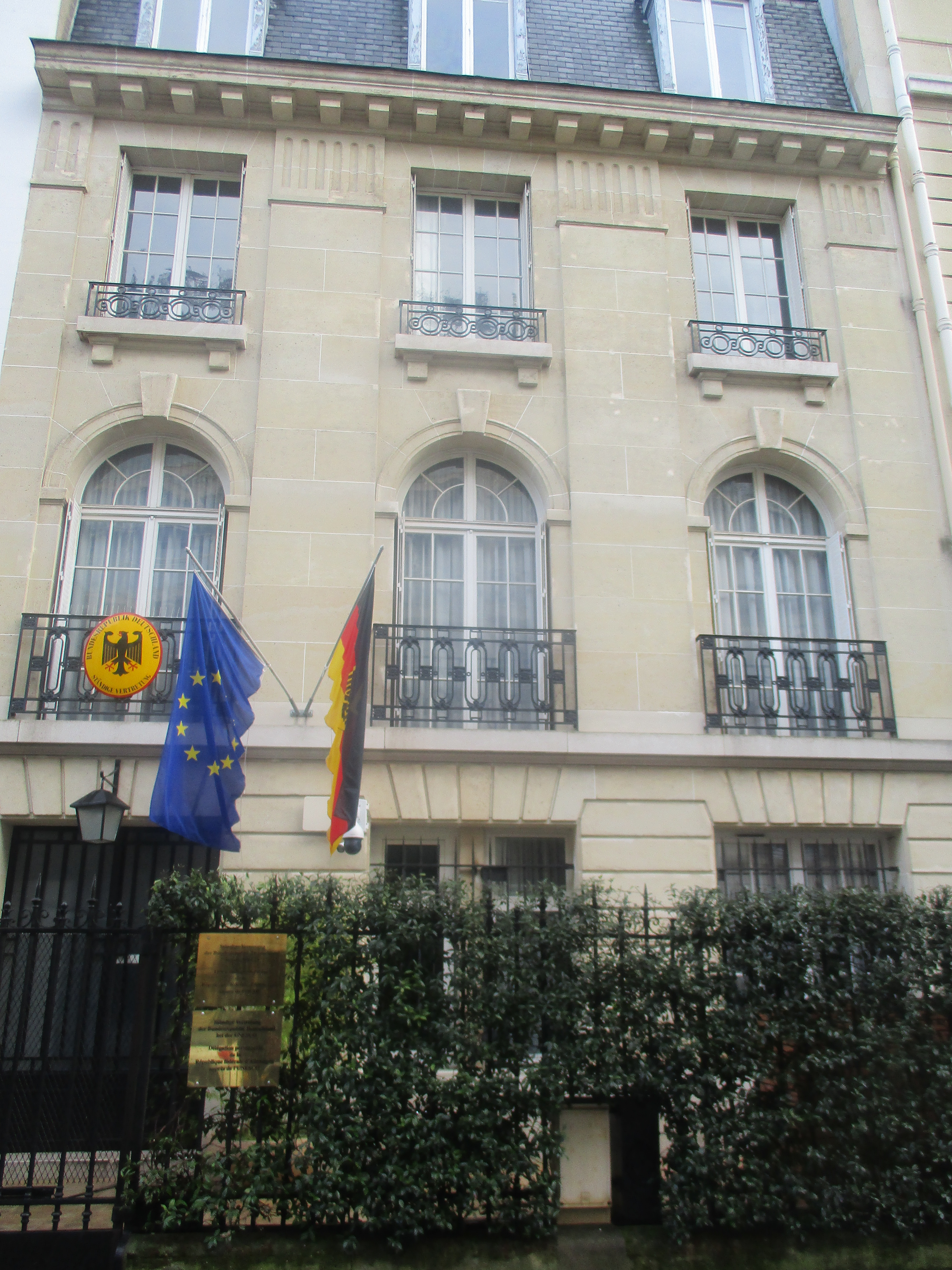
Permanent Mission of Germany to the OECD

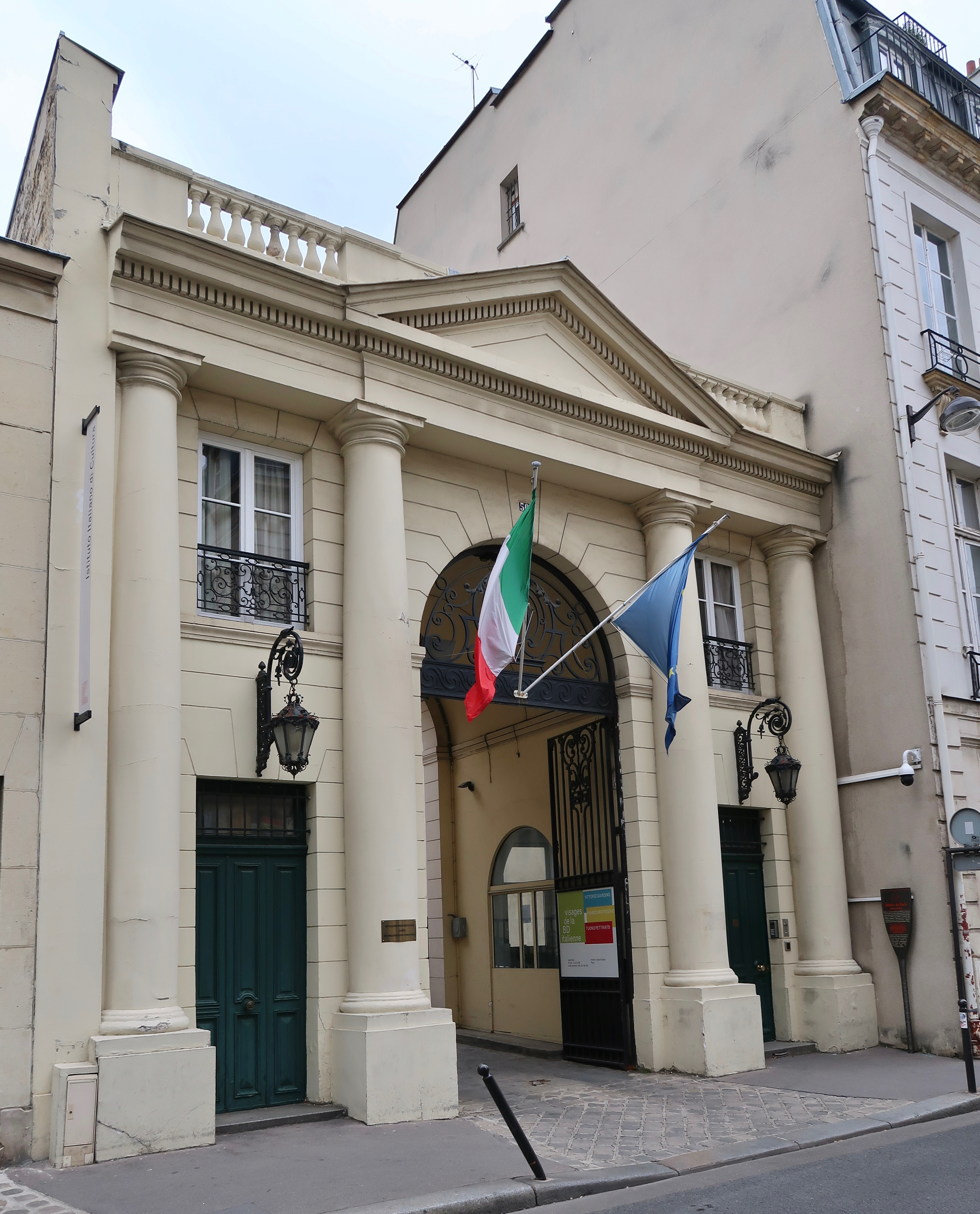
Permanent Mission of Italy to the OECD

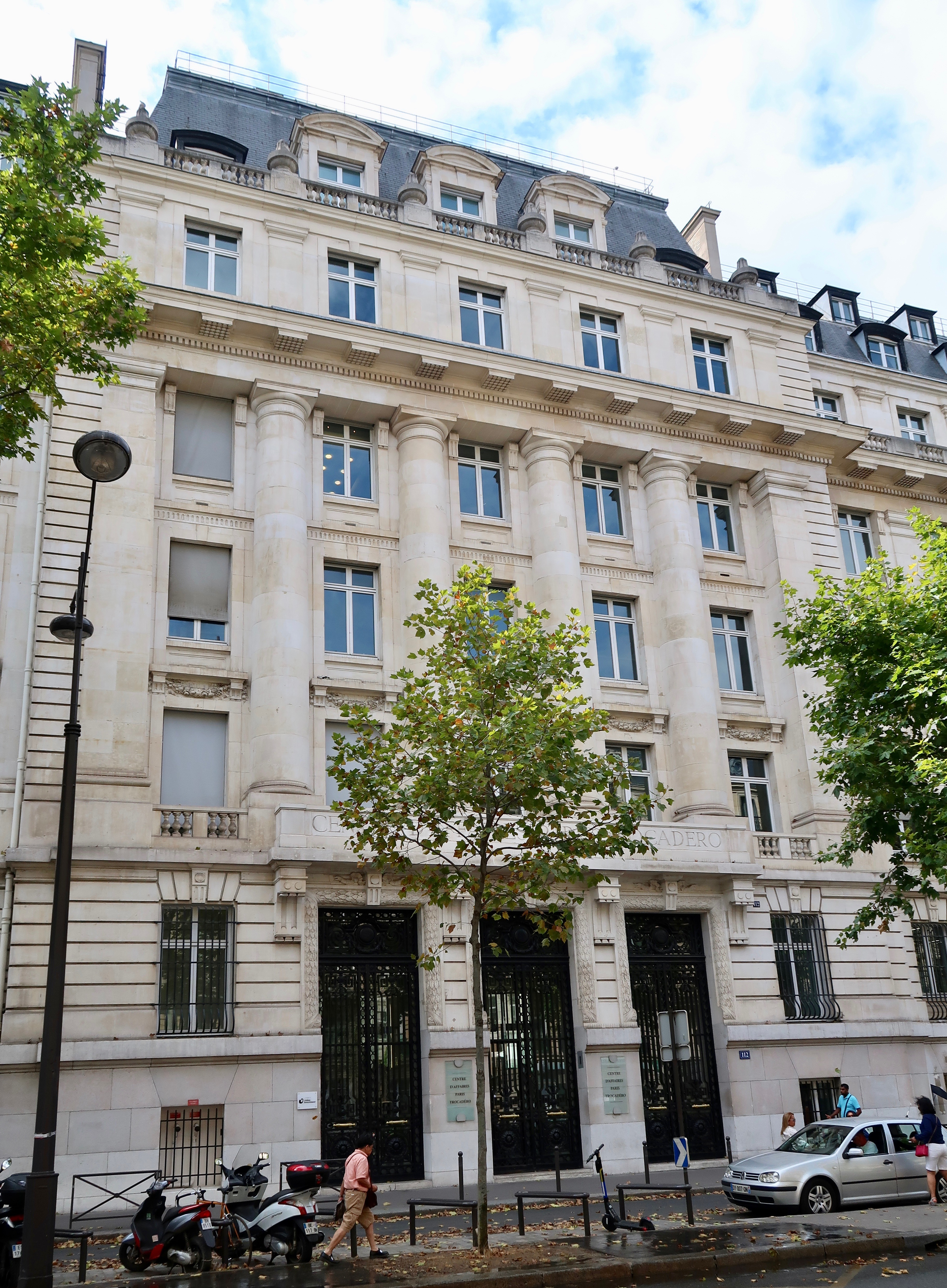
Permanent Mission of Japan to the OECD

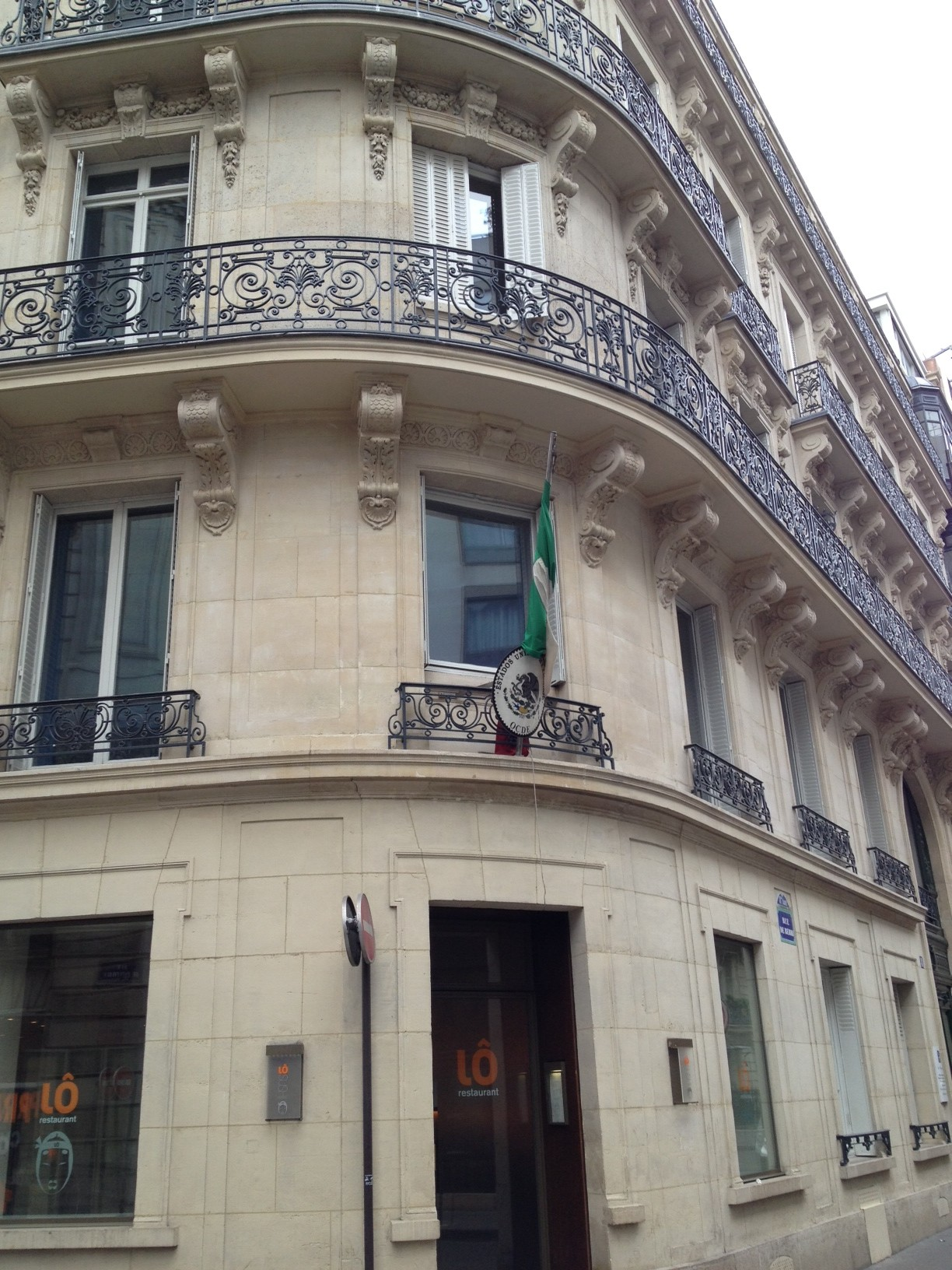
Permanent Mission of Mexico to the OECD

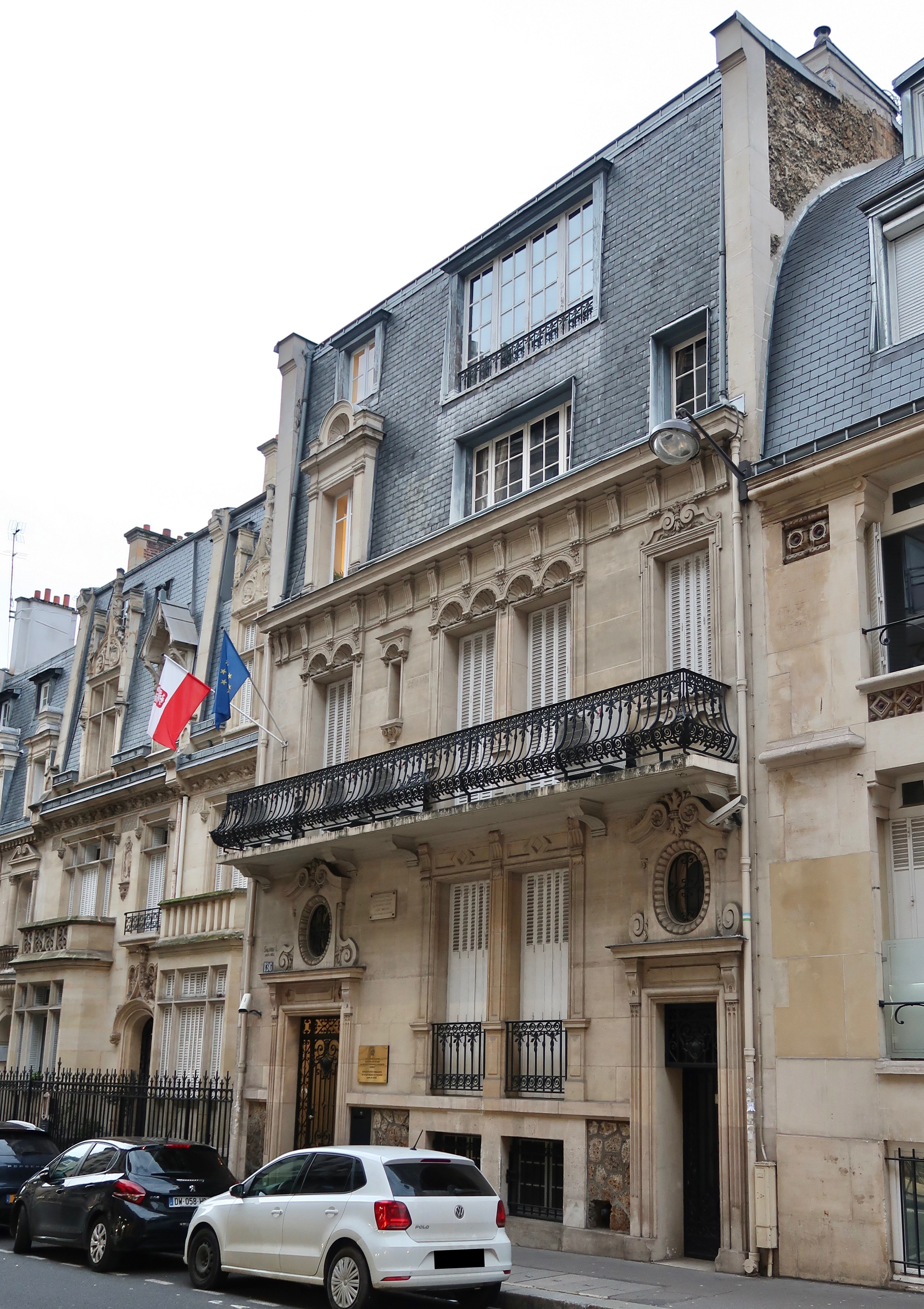
Permanent Mission of Poland to the OECD

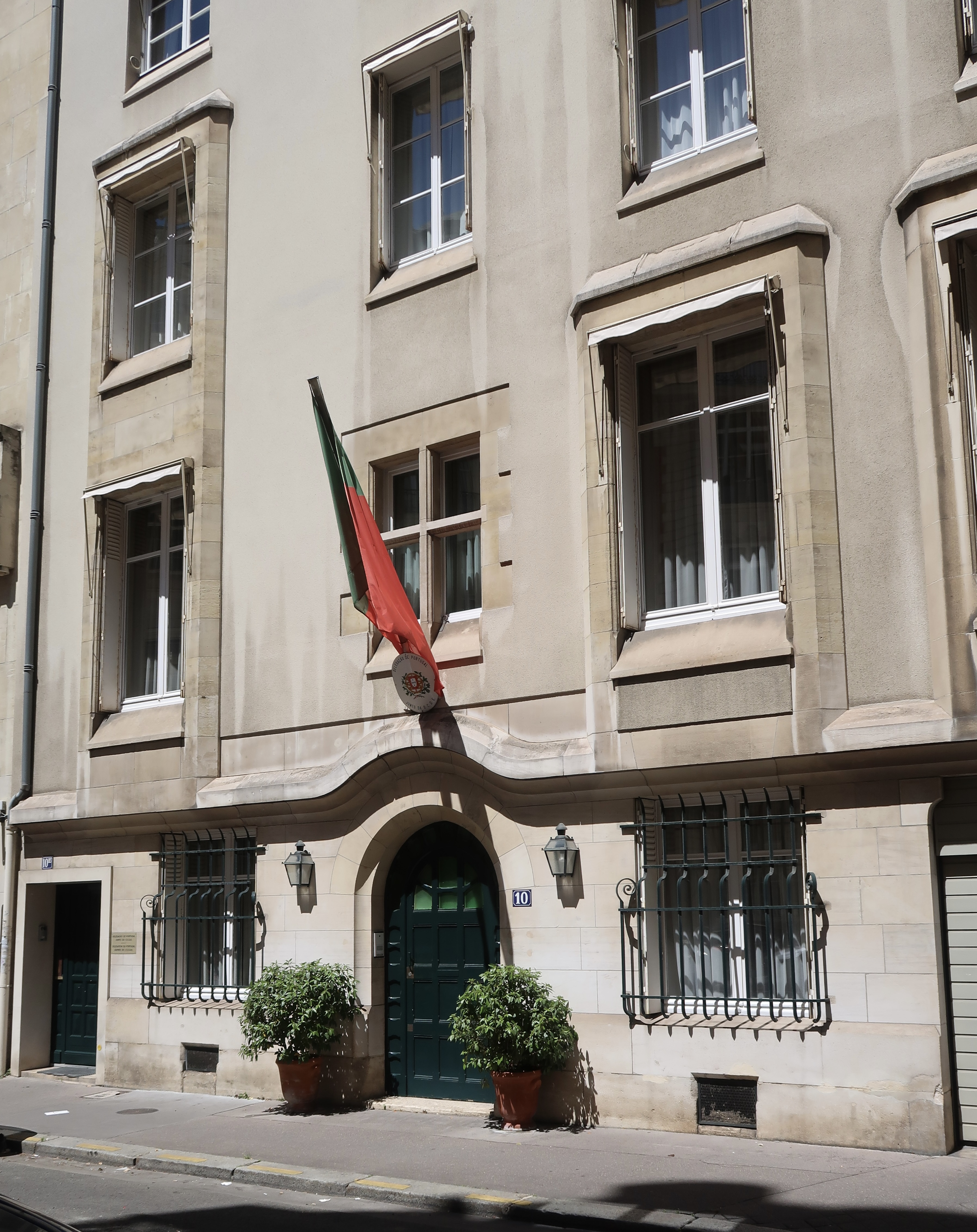
Permanent Mission of Portugal to the OECD

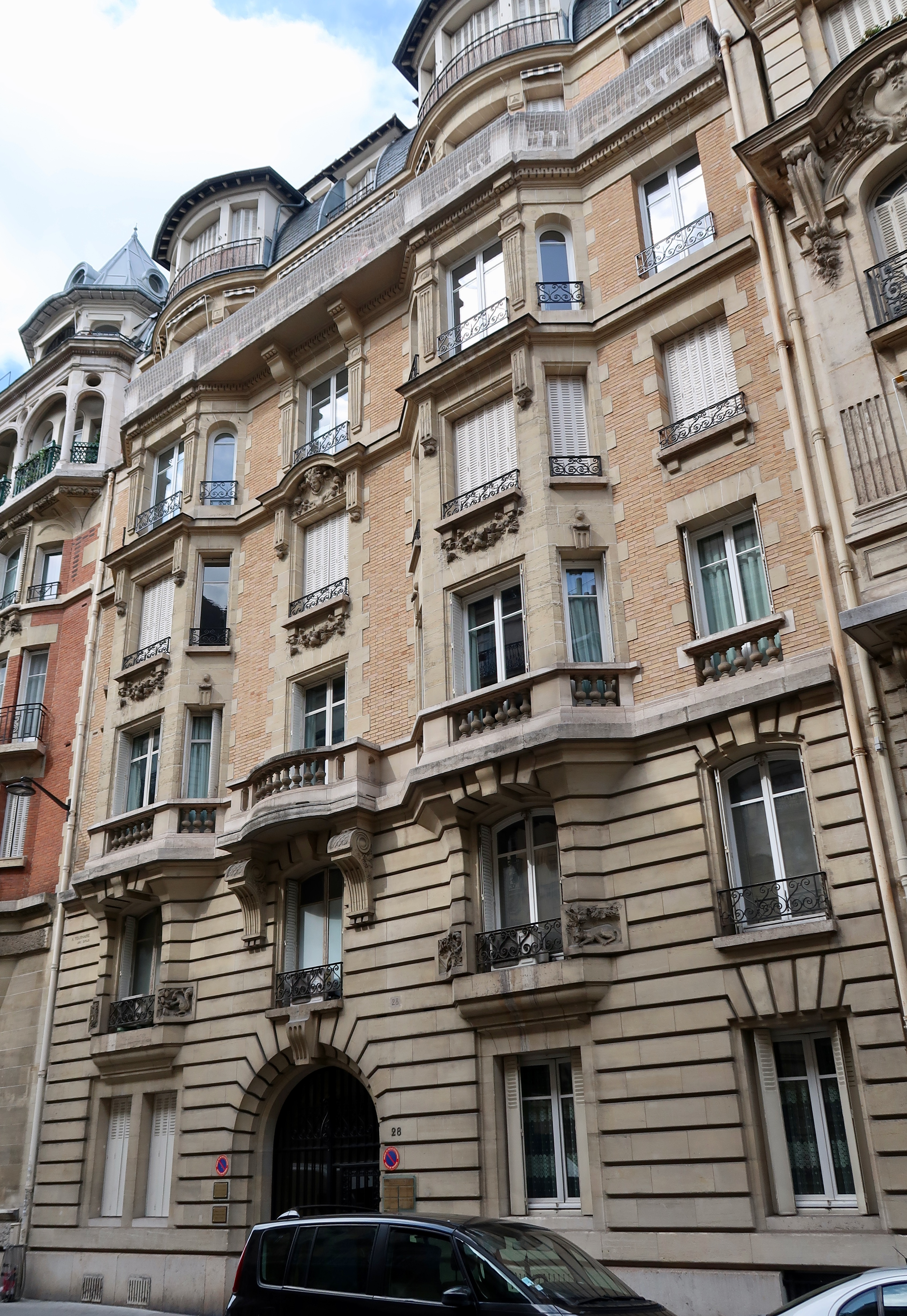
Permanent Mission of Slovak Republic to the OECD

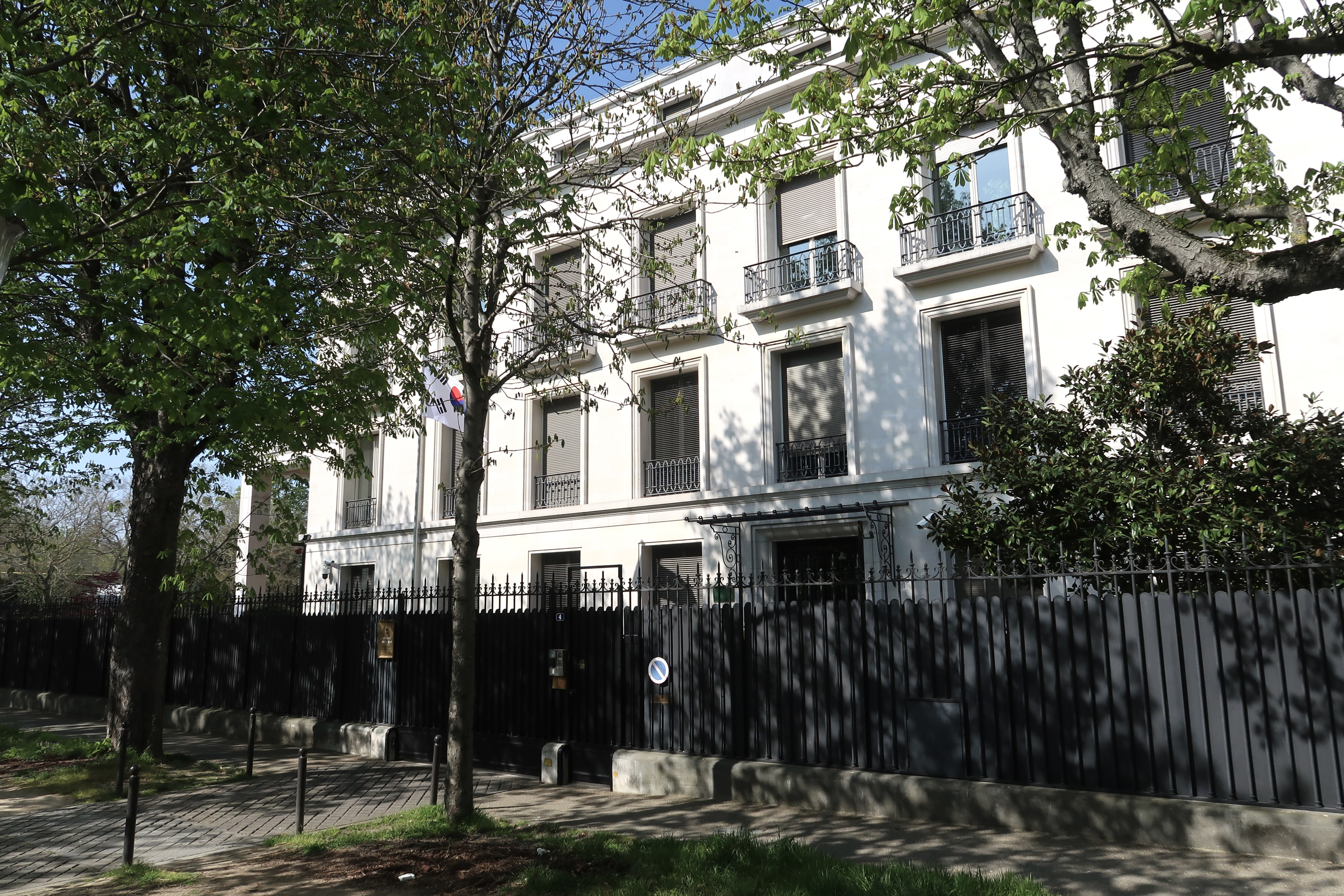
Permanent Mission of South Korea to the OECD

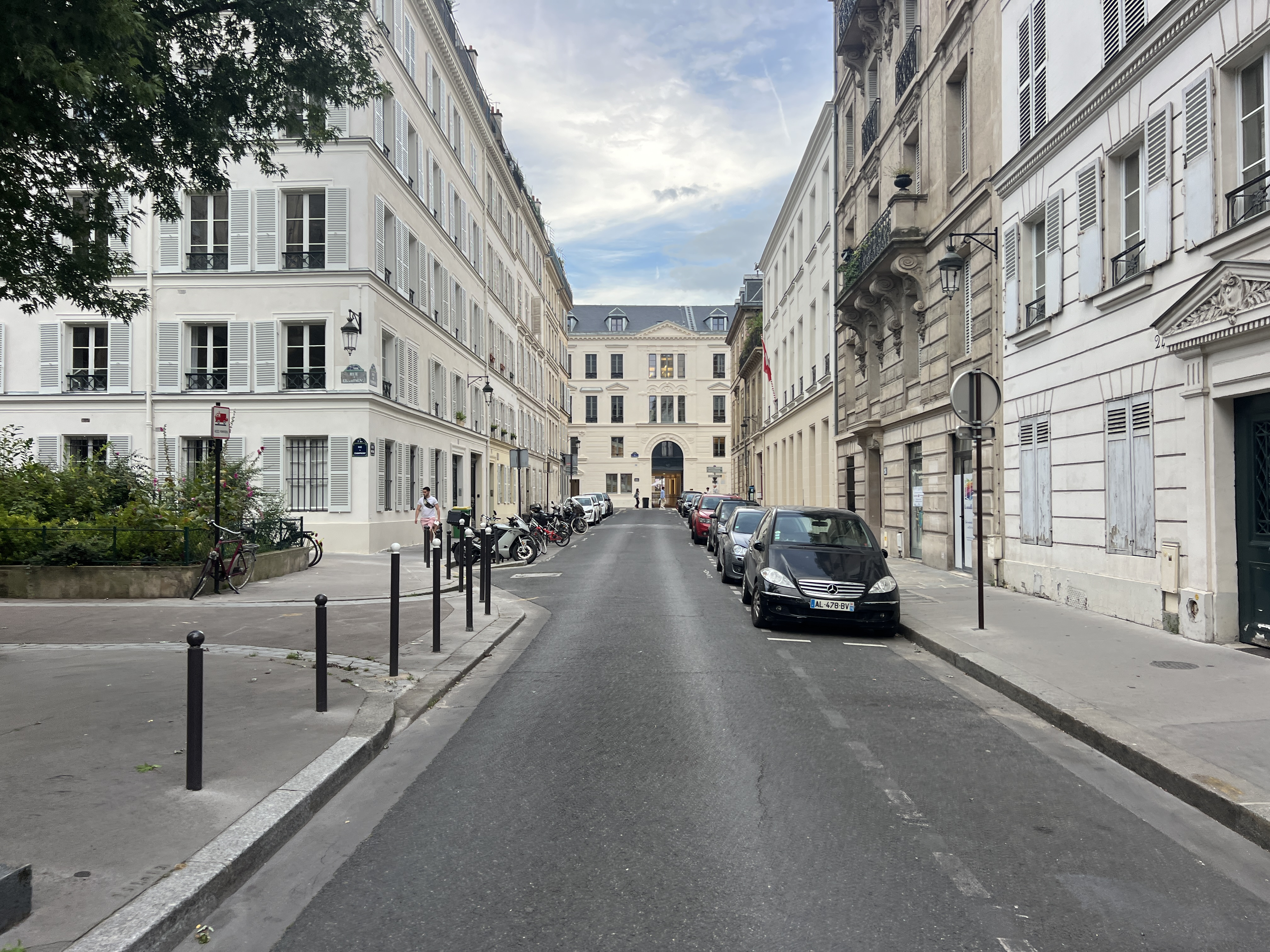
Permanent Mission of Switzerland to the OECD

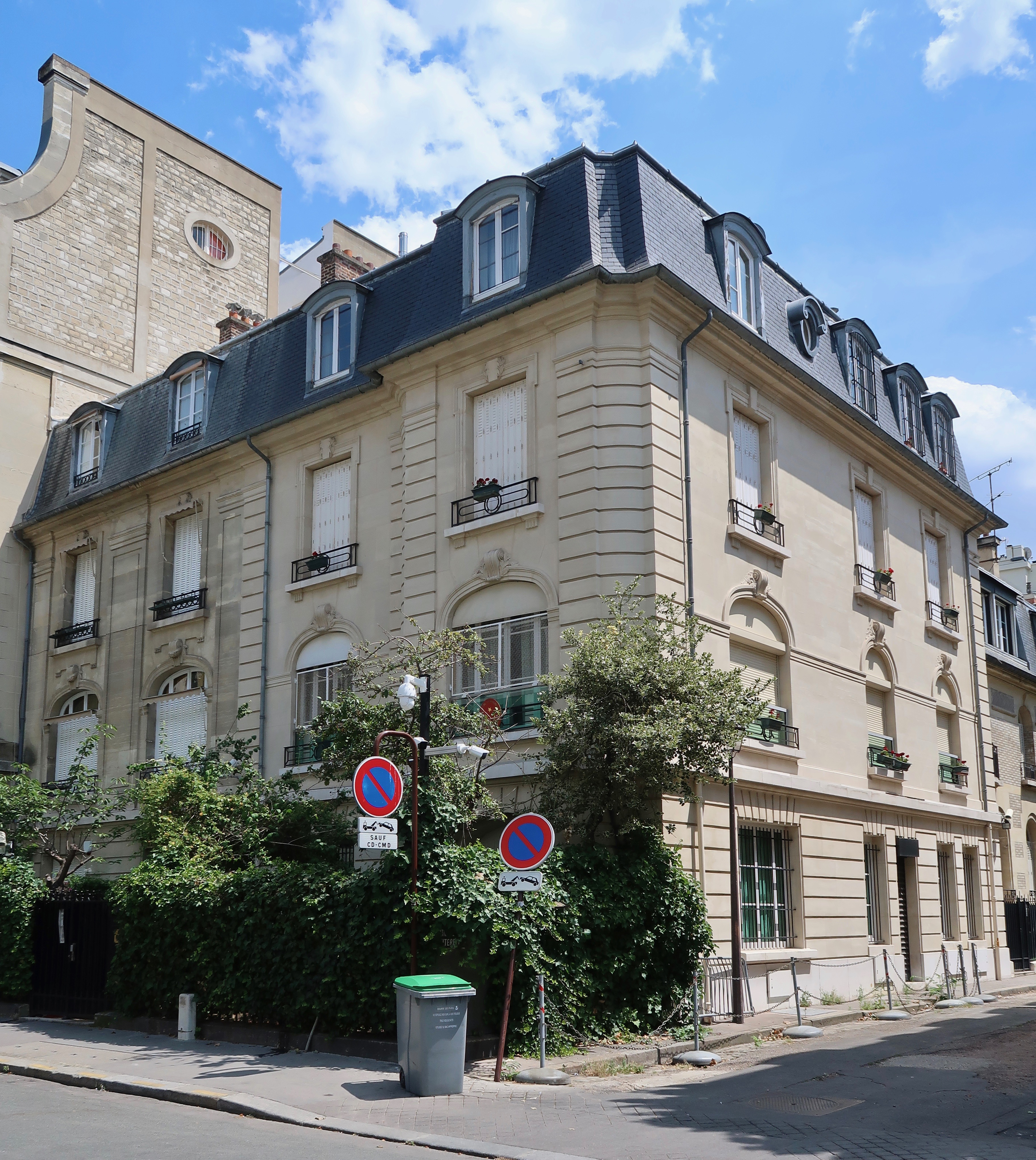
Permanent Mission of Turkey to the OECD

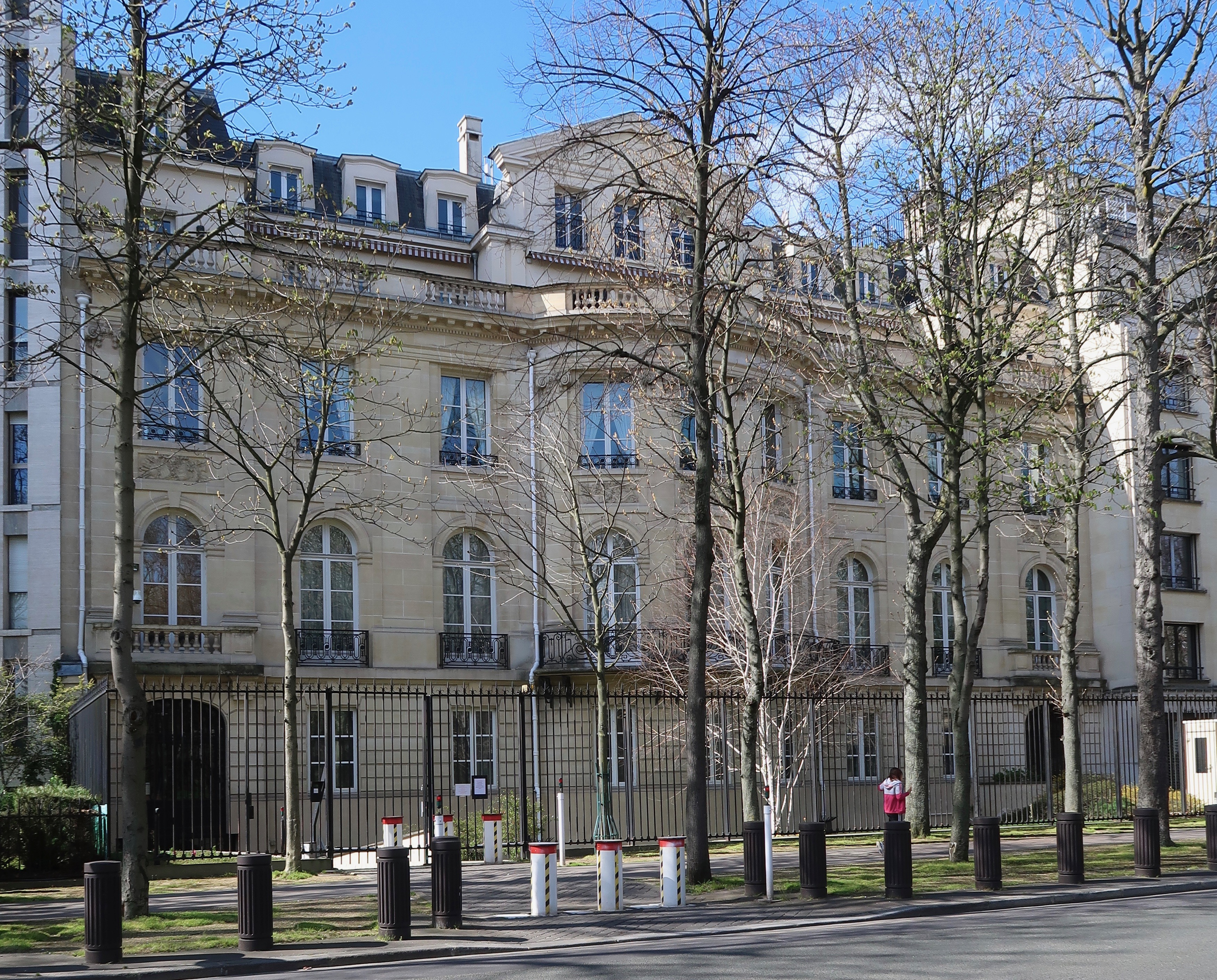
Permanent Mission of the United States to the OECD

== See also ==
- Comecon
- Frascati Manual
- German Marshall Fund
- Good laboratory practice
- International organisations in Europe
- International Transport Forum
- List of country groupings
- List of multilateral free trade agreements
- Marshall Plan
- OECD Anti-Bribery Convention
- OECD Better Life Index
- OECD Environmental Performance Reviews
- OECD Working Party on SMEs and Entrepreneurship
- Official development assistance
- Organization for Security and Co-operation in Europe
- Transfer pricing
