= Ethical Supply Chain Program =

Charitable organization

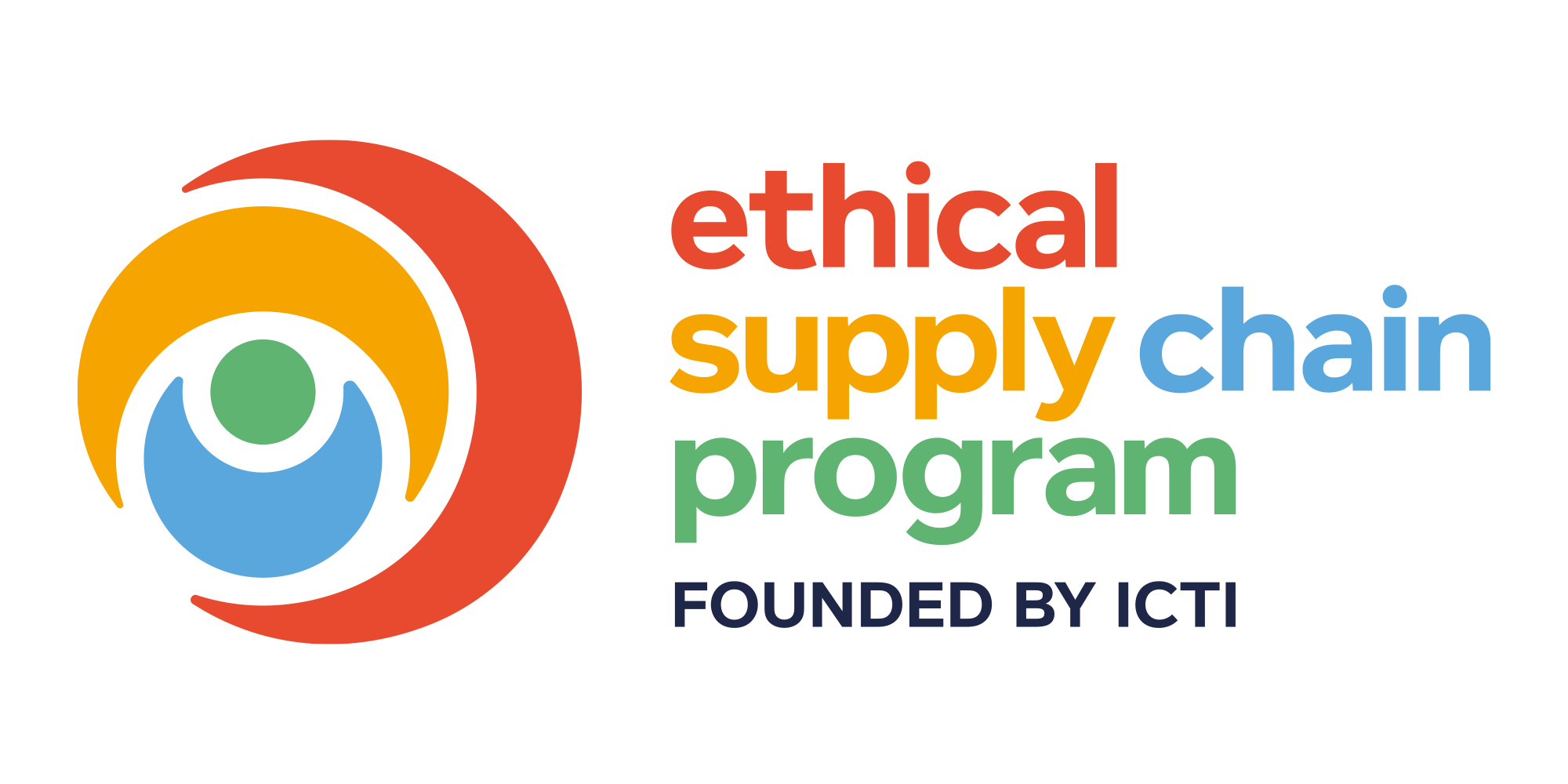
- Founded: 2004, New York City
- Legal status: Not-for-profit organisation
- Purpose: Improving labor standards and enhancing workers lives in the global supply chain
- Headquarters: Hong Kong
- Key people: Carmel Giblin (President and CEO); Edena Low (Chair); Alan G. Hassenfeld (Emertitus Chair)
- Website: ethicalsupplychain.org

The Ethical Supply Chain Program is an independent, not-for-profit organisation established in 2004 to safeguard and improve ethical and sustainability standards in the global supply chain.

The Ethical Supply Chain Program, is the ethical manufacturing program for the manufacturing industry. The Ethical Supply Chain Program (ESCP) is the most widespread labor and social standard, applicable to all manufacturing industries. The program is based on the ICTI Code of Business Practices. It is estimated that 70% of global toy sales are covered by the Ethical Supply Chain Program (ESCP).

== History of the Ethical Supply Chain Program ==
Working conditions in Asian toy factories in the 1990s were under intense scrutiny, most notably following the Kader Toy Factory Fire in Bangkok (Thailand), considered the worst industrial factory fire in history, and a toy factory fire in Shenzhen (China) in 1993 which together caused more than 250 deaths. As a reaction to the tragedy, the Hong Kong Toy Coalition was established and published the "Charter on the Safe Production of Toys" in the mid-1990s. In this charter, the Hong Kong Toy Coalition demanded the improvement of labor, social, and safety standards in Chinese toy factories.

Following the production of the charter, larger toy brands and retailers started to create their own Codes of Conduct. Hasbro established its “Global Business Ethics Principles” in 1993, Zapf Creation a code of conduct in 1995, The Walt Disney Company its “International Labor Standards” in 1996, Mattel its “Global Manufacturing Principles” 1997, and LEGO created a code of conduct in 1997. It is estimated that there were up to 70 different standards which made it difficult for toy factories to comply with varying standards and created significant amounts of duplication of auditing in factories. Therefore, an industry wide ethical manufacturing standard was called for in the toy industry.

The International Council of Toy Industries (ICTI) created the Code of Business Practices in 1995. In 2002 at the annual general meeting of ICTI, the member toy industry associations unanimously agreed to launch the ICTI CARE Process, a worldwide auditing process to implement the ICTI Code of Business Practices, drive convergence, and reduce duplication of social auditing in the global toy industry supply chain.

In 2004, the ICTI CARE Foundation was created as a non-profit organisation working completely independently of ICTI to oversee the ICTI CARE Process.

In 2018, the organization became the ICTI Ethical Toy Program. Along with a new name, the next generation of the Ethical Toy Program was unveiled with an updated mission and strategy for the organization, a new membership model and a brand-new look and feel to deliver the changes.

In 2024, the organization renamed to become the Ethical Supply Chain Program, to reflect its wider adoption in manufacturing industries globally. The organisation has also developed a number of tools, assessments and programs delivering beyond audit. Most recently, committing to supporting 30,000 children by the end of 2025 through its Family-Friendly Factory program, expanding from China to Vietnam and Mexico and funded primarily by LEGO and additional support from Spin Master and other supporters of the program supporters.

== Ethical Supply Chain Program Certification Program ==
Ethical Supply Chain Program (ESCP) is an ethical manufacturing program specifically designed for the global manufacturing industry, based on the ICTI Code of Business Practices.

=== ICTI Code of Business Practices ===
The ICTI Code of Business Practices, upon which the Ethical Supply Chain Program is based, covers nine core principles:

- Working hours must not be excessive & overtime must be voluntary
- Legal and fair pay
- No child labor
- No forced or involuntary labor
- No discrimination
- Employees must be treated with dignity and respect
- Employees' right of association must be observed
- Individual written labor contracts must be provided
- Working conditions are safe and employee health is not endangered

=== Certification ===
When a factory is awarded a certification by the Ethical Supply Chain Program this denotes their adherence to the ICTI Code of Business Practices.

== See also ==
- Fair trade
- Certification
- Toy Industry Association
