= Klaus F. Müller =

German dentist

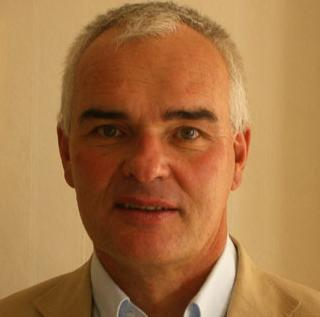
- Born: July 20, 1949 (age 76)
- Awards: Philipp-Pfaff-Preis 1984
- Scientific career
- Fields: dental implantology historicism (art)

Klaus F. Müller is a German dentist and European pioneer of modern dental implantology. He grew up in Sinn in Hesse, Germany, where he was born on July 20, 1949.

== Biography ==
After studying natural science at the Göttingen University and the Heidelberg University Klaus F. Müller approbated in 1976 and promovated in 1977 at the Giessen University (Centre for dermatology and andrology). Privately, he is concerned with the art and architecture of historicism (art) and he is an avid ultralight pilot. He is married and has two adult children.

== Dental implantology ==
In 1976 he became a member of the first German Academy of Implantology (DAIOS) in Bremen and cofounder of the Society of European Implantology in Hamburg.

In 1978 and 1980 he published the then acclaimed first German manuals on all methods of oral implantology (at that time against resistance of the universities).

Klaus F. Müller produced numerous instructional films on various implant systems and their prosthetic restoration from 1976 to 1982, to increase his scientific reputation as a practitioner dentist. He showed the films at international conferences for implantology. The partial underlay of the films with music and in some parts the bloody surgical representation was initially highly debated as it was a noventum for that time. In the early years, it was hence seen as a violation of medical ethical principles. In the transition from the elaborate narrow-film technology (Super 8, Super 16) to the video presentation (VHS, U-matic), Klaus F. Müller was a pioneer in this field. Cutting, sound recording, camera tracking and lighting has become easier with smaller, lighter devices. In addition to further training courses, contributed in particular the boost in innovation and the associated focus on moving images significantly to the spread of new dental implantological techniques in Europe. Especially the non-written sources from the early days of oral implantology are threatened with decay. Digitalization of historical operation films has been initiated to save this archive (see, for example, Category: Klaus F. Müller Wikimedia Commons)

Müller's friendship with the American engineer Thomas D. Driskell (Bicon) led to a number of publications and further education films about Synthodont, Titanodont, Titanaloy and Synthograft (products of Miter company) from 1982 till 1985.

His main income was the modification of American dental implant systems on European standards. Some of these innovations were inside chilled drills, bone management, special mucosal punches for minimal invasive operations or plastic splinting with UV light hardening.

His cooperation with Dutch dental implantologists (CMFI - college for Maxillofaciale Implantology) around Bruggenkate and Oosterbeek started 1983–84 on a dental congress in Davos and resulted in cooperated publications.

In 1989, Müller became the cofounder of BDIZ/EDI (European Association of Dental Implantologists) and was in different leading positions till 2004. Müller has published over 100 articles related to oral medicine, such as bone management, narrow jaw implants, taxes for medical products, fracture testing, new implant systems, quality management, dental ethics etc. His aviation-borrowed keyword “Keep it safe and simple” runs through all his lectures and publications. In opposition to oral surgeons, Mueller always supported dental specialization and master's courses for implantology. In Germany since 2002 "Tätigkeitsschwerpunkt Implantologie" (minimum 200 implants in five years) is a recognized additional title for dentists.

During Müller's tenure as chairman of the committee for register and qualification at BDIZ/EDI (1993–2003), he established criteria and standards for the dental implantology in cooperation with P. Ehrl and Helmut B. Engels.

From 1999 to 2004, he analysed implant fractures together with a Fraunhofer Institute in Freiburg. These fracture tests and stress tests led to a new dynamic load model for implants and abutments (See DIN/ISO EN 14801). The publication of further studies of dental implants and abutment fractures led to a change in the Medical Devices Act. Product defects or errors in the batch must be reported to the Federal Institute for Drugs and Medical Devices (Germany:BfArM) and they are stored in a database.

After finishing his activity in his own dental surgery in 2007, he is still working as a lecturer at IZI (Institut of Dental Implantology) in Limburg and gives lessons in cooperation with CSI (Ceska polestnost per Implantologii) at the Karl's University in Prague. Since 2018 boardmember (secretary) of Foundation 22stars in Uganda.

== Awards ==
In 1984 Müller was honoured with the award of the Philipp Pfaff Society (named after the dentist of the Prussian king, Frederick the Great). Topic: Application of beta tricalcium phosphate (Synthograft) in oral surgery.

1990 he got the honorary membership in Dutch CMFI.

== Selected publications ==
- Mueller, K.: Kleines Handbuch zur oralen Implantologie, 1978, ISBN 3 9800176-2-1, Kleines Handbuch der oralen Implantologie
- Mueller, K.: Die Quintessenz der oralen Implantologie, 1980,ISBN 3876528070, Die Quintessenz der oralen Implantologie
- Mueller, K. F.: Park und Villa Haas - Historismus, Kunst und Lebensstil, ISBN 978-3-86468-160-8, Park und Villa Haas: Historismus - Kunst und Lebensstil
- Handbuch zum BDIZ Implantat-Register, Hrsg. H.B. Engels, 1. Ausgabe, Jahrbuch Verlag, Bonn 1994, ISBN 3-89296-025-9, Handbuch zum BDIZ-Implantat-Register
- Aktueller Stand der zahnärztlichen Implantologie, Hrsg. H.J. Hartmann, Spitta Verlag 2000, ISBN 3-921883-23-7, Aktueller Stand der zahnärztlichen Implantologie. ... Implantatregister
- BDIZ Weißbuch-Implantologie, Jahrbuch Verlag, Bonn 2000, ISBN 3-89296-056-9, Weißbuch Implantologie
- BDIZ (Hrsg.) Gutachterhandbuch Implantologie, 1.Auflage 2002, ISBN 3-929851-90-3- Breisach: Med. Verl.-und Informationsdienste, Gutachterhandbuch Implantologie
- BDIZ Jahrbuch 2002 Bilanz: 10 Jahre BDIZ Q+R Ausschussarbeit zur Qualitätssicherung, Jahrbuch Verlag, Bonn 2002,ISBN 3-89296-065-8
- Literature by and about Klaus F. Müller in the German National Library catalogue
- Literature by and about Klaus F. Müller in the German National Library catalogue
- Müller, Klaus Friedhelm 1949-VIAF ID: 304360527 (Personal)Permalink: 304360527

== External ==
- Media related to Klaus F. Müller at Wikimedia Commons
- Biografie - Dr. med. dent. Klaus Müller - Zahnarzt und Implantologe
