= IAJ =

IAJ may refer to:

- Implant-abutment junction, the location of intimate contact between a dental implant and its restorative abutment
- International Association of Judges a professional, non-political, international organization of national associations of judges
- Institute for Alternative Journalism, former name of the Independent Media Institute, founder of AlterNet
- Interchange Association, Japan, former name of the Japan–Taiwan Exchange Association, which represents the interests of Japan in Taiwan
