= Fidele Sandhasen =

Die Fidelen Sandhasen e. V.
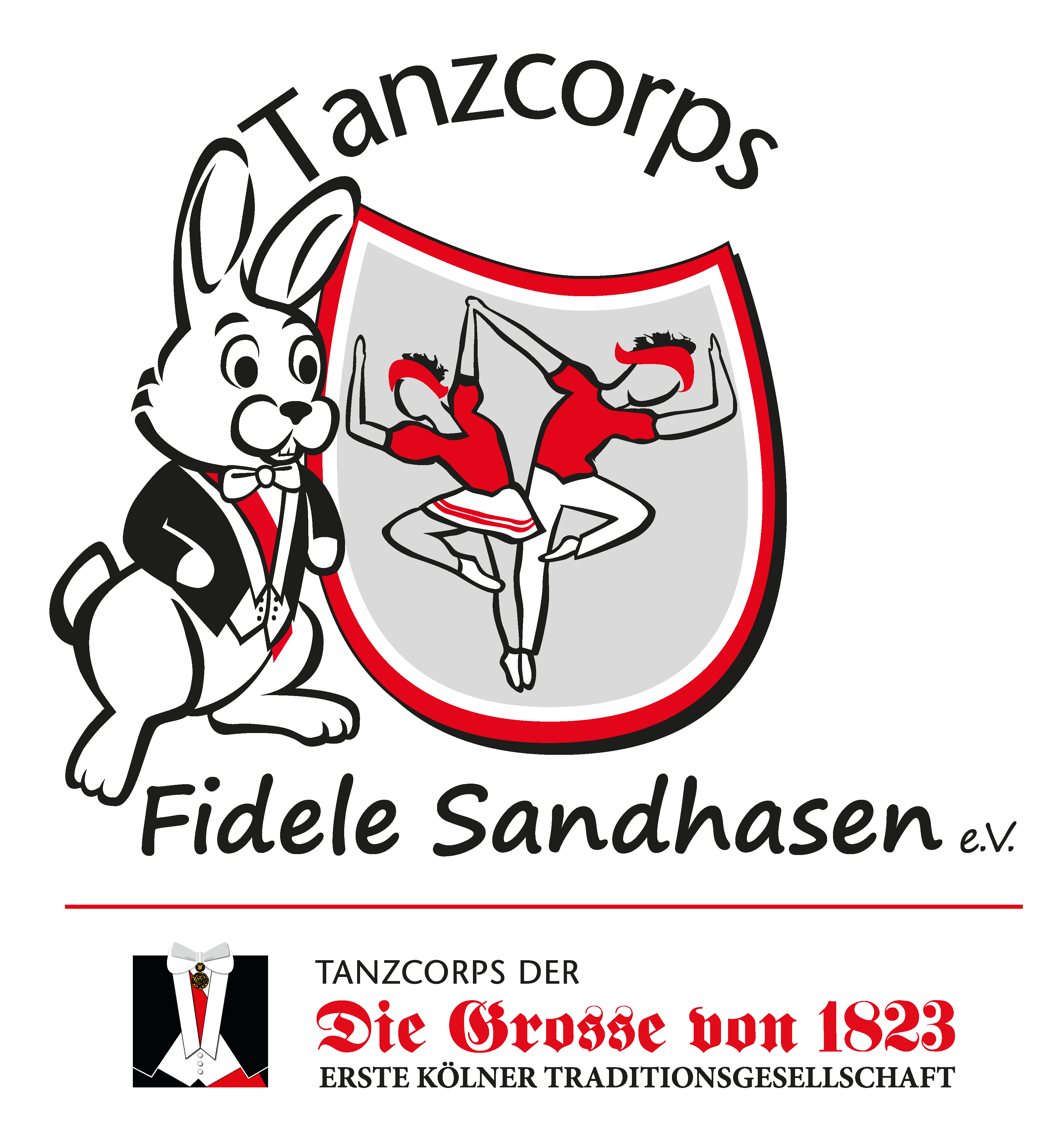
- Established: 1995
- Legal status: registered non-profit association
- Purpose: Care and preservation of carnival traditions and carnaval dance sport
- Leader: Univ.-Prof. Dr. Dr. Joachim E. Zöller
- Website: fidelesandhasen.de

Die Fidelen Sandhasen e.V. are a dance group from Cologne. They are active in performance carnival and dance competitions and have won German championship titles multiple times.

== History ==
In 1995, the Carneval Society Fidele Sandhasen Oberlar von 1953 e. V (Oberlar is a district of Troisdorf) founded its own dance group, the TC Fidele Sandhasen. In 2010, the dance group established an independent association, Die Fidele Sandhasen e.V. The association has around 400 members (as of 2025) and is now based in Cologne. Since 2016, the dance group has been cooperating with the oldest Cologne carnival society Die Grosse von 1823. Through this cooperation and since the club’s headquarters were moved to Cologne, the dance group Fidele Sandhasen has become a “Cologne dance group.” The CS „Fidele Sandhasen“ Oberlar 1953 e.V. continues to exist in Troisdorf.

== Structure and Achievements ==
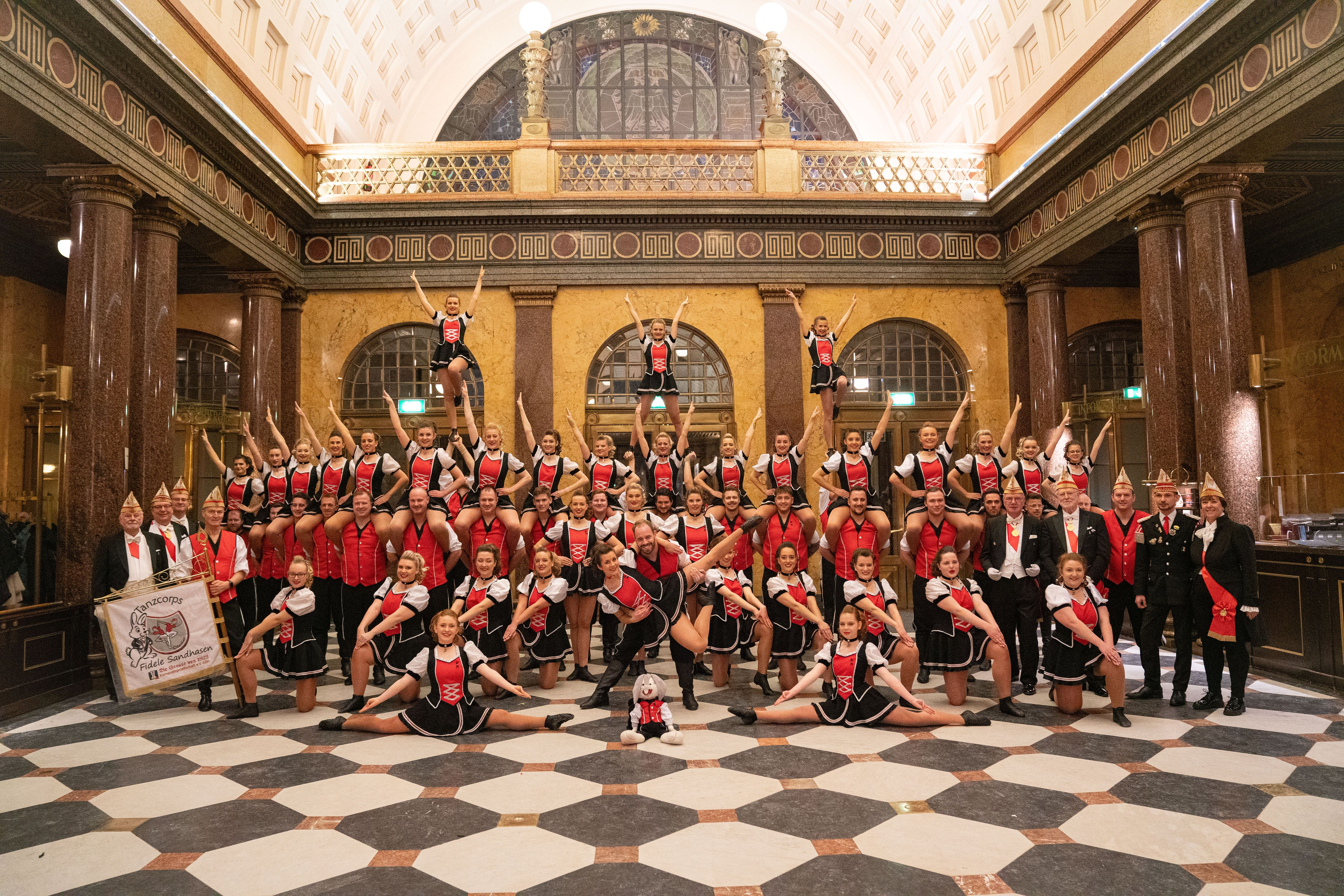
Active guard at the Kurhaus Wiesbaden (2023)

The dancers are divided into three age groups: the Youth Guard (6–10 years), the Junior Guard (12–15 years), and the Active Guard (from 15 years onwards). The 'Dance Group Fidele Sandhasen is a club for carnival dance sport, too. Since 1998, the dance corps has become German champion three times, German vice-champion four times, and Northern German champion eleven times in the 'Mixed Guard' discipline of the Federation of German Carnival (BDK).

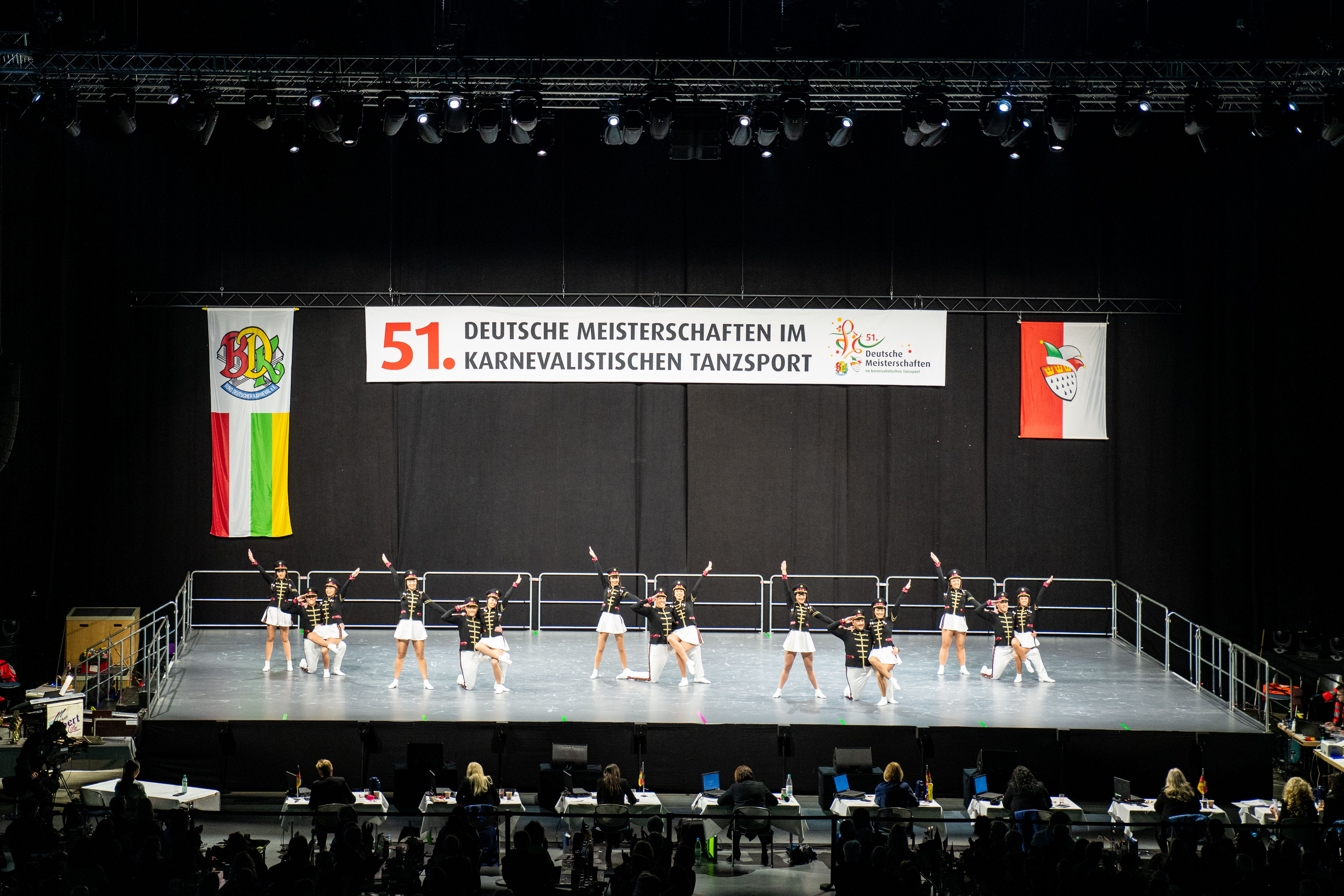
Performance at the 51st German Championships of the Federation of German Carnival (BDK) in Guard Dance

=== Mixed Guard (Active) ===
- German Champion: 2004, 2005, 2009
- German Vice Champion: 2001, 2002, 2003, 2012
- 3rd Place at the German Championships: 2008, 2010, 2011

=== Dance Couples ===
- German Champion (Alina Klein/Christopher Albert): 2002 (Juniors), 2003 (Juniors), 2004 (Juniors), 2008 (Active)

== Television Appearances ==
In addition to participating in tournaments, the club appeared in several television shows. In 2012, it was featured together with Lena Meyer-Landrut on the TV total Prunksitzung. In 2017, the dance corps appeared in the episode Tanzmariechen of the crime series Tatort.
