= Joachim E. Zöller =

German physician (b 1953)

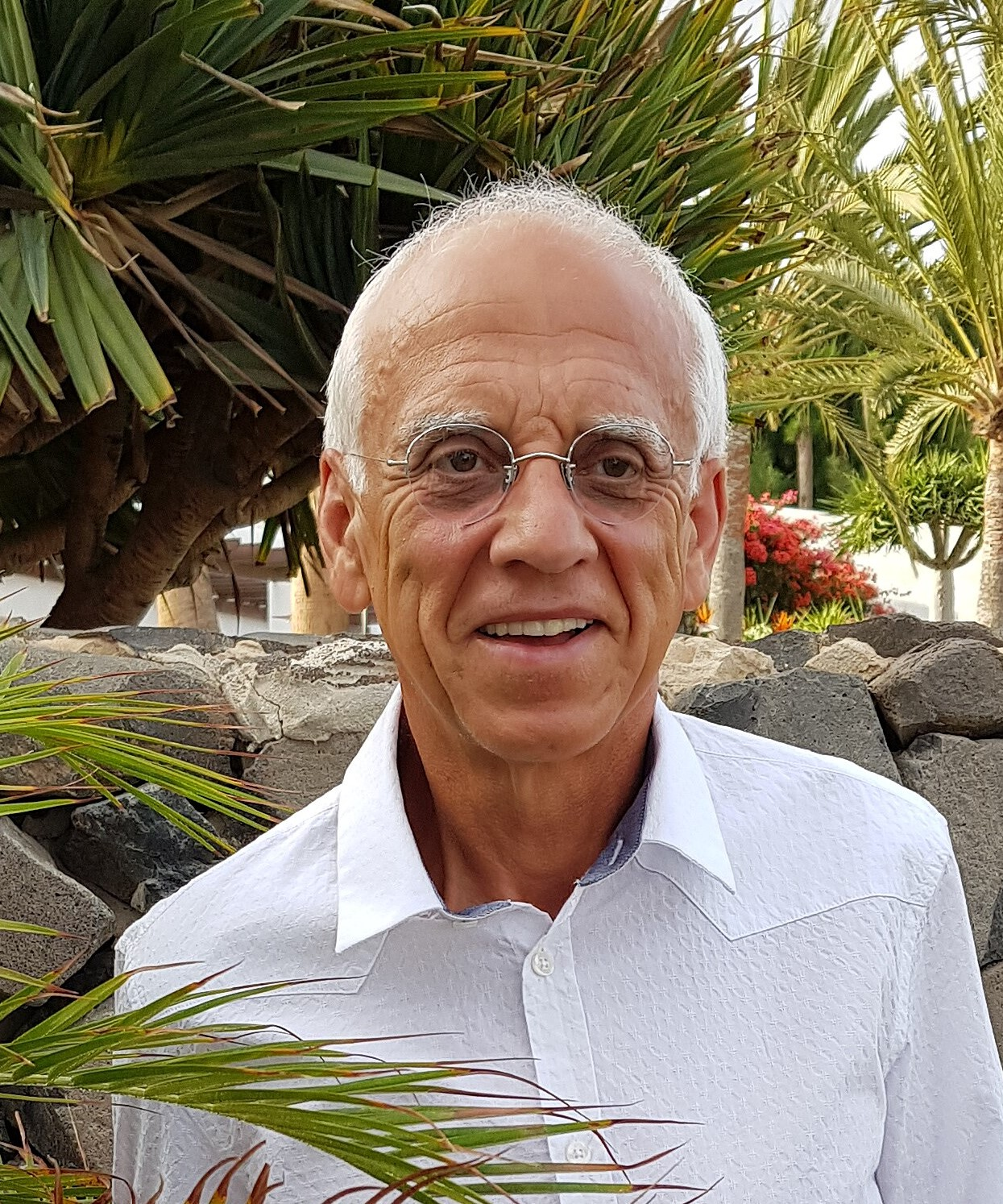
- Joachim E. Zöller in 2018
- Born: 6 September 1953 (age 72); Karlsruhe, Germany
- Known for: Plastic facial reconstruction and craniofacial surgery
- Awards: Martin-Wassmund-Prize
- Scientific career
- Fields: Oral and maxillofacial surgery
- Workplaces: University of Cologne

Joachim Eugen Emil Zöller (born 6 September 1953 in Karlsruhe) is a German craniofacial, oral and maxillofacial surgeon, and university professor. He was the director of the Clinic and Polyclinic for Oral, Maxillofacial and Plastic Facial Surgery, and the Polyclinic for Oral Surgery and Implantology at the University Hospital of Cologne.

== Medical career ==
Zöller studied medicine at the University of Heidelberg and dentistry at the University of Mainz. In 1980, he earned his medical doctorate (Dr. med.), and in 1984, his dental doctorate (Dr. med. dent.). In 1992, he completed his habilitation at the University of Heidelberg. From 1984 to 1997, he worked at the Clinic for Oral, Maxillofacial, and Facial Surgery at Heidelberg University Hospital, most recently as senior consultant and deputy director of the clinic. From 1997 to 2022, he was chair holder and director of the Clinic and Polyclinic for Oral, Maxillofacial, and Plastic Facial Surgery, as well as the Polyclinic for Oral Surgery and Implantology at the University of Cologne. He was chairman of the Conference of Clinic Directors and, until 2018, a member of the supervisory board of the university hospital. Furthermore, from 2011 to 2022, he served as managing director of the Centre for Dental, Oral, and Maxillofacial Medicine.

He was and is president or vice president of various scientific professional societies, such as the German Society for Oral Implantology or the European Association of Dental Implantologists (BDIZ EDI). In addition, he works as a business consultant.

He also worked for several years for the German-Vietnamese Society for the Promotion of Medicine in Vietnam (DEVIEMED) in Hanoi, Da Nang, and Hue, and at times served as its president. As part of his charitable work, Zöller supports humanitarian organizations by performing surgeries free of charge. For example, he operated on victims of the Chernobyl nuclear disaster, people with cleft lip and palate in Eritrea, and patients with other conditions.

He has written numerous professional articles and is the author and editor of monographs, book chapters, and books, as well as the holder of patents.

== Research areas ==
His research includes work on dental implantology, bone and soft tissue augmentation techniques (including alveolar ridge distraction and bone grafting), imaging diagnostics, the medicinal prevention of malignant head and neck tumors, plastic, aesthetic, and functional surgical reconstruction procedures using microsurgical tissue transfers, and craniofacial surgical techniques for facial and craniofacial malformations.

== Cologne Carnival chairman ==
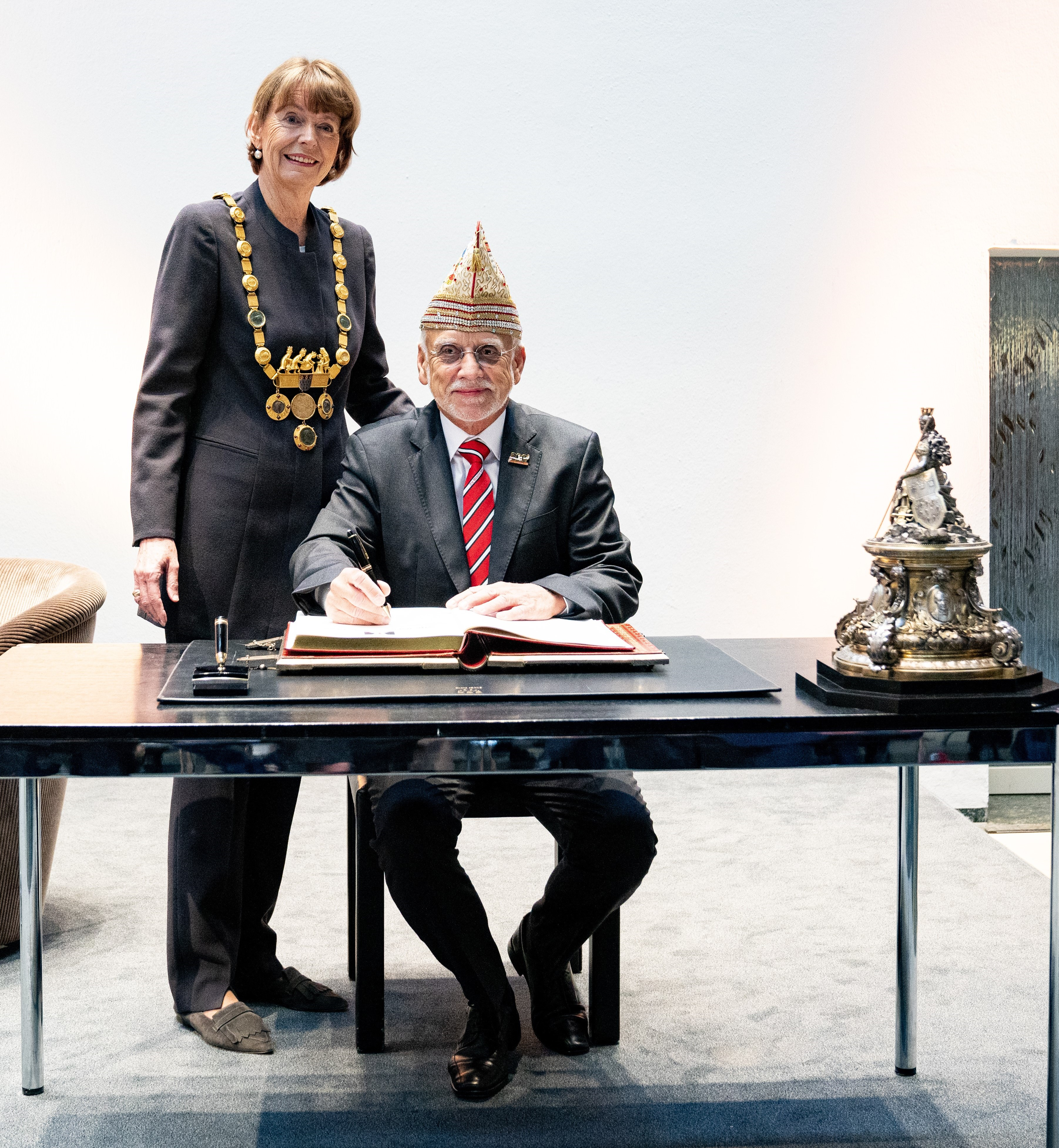
Joachim Zöller during the signing of the Golden Book of the City of Cologne 2022; with Mayor Henriette Reker

Zöller has been president and chairman of the Cologne Carnival Society Die Grosse von 1823 since 2012, as well as chairman of the Dance Corps Fidele Sandhasen e. V. Since 2020, he has been a member of the Carnival Advisory Board of the Cologne Carnival Committee.

== Selected awards ==
- 1991: Annual Award of the Working Group for Oral and Maxillofacial Surgery of the DGZMK.
- 1992: Martin-Wassmund Prize (Science Prize 1991) of the German Society for Oral and Maxillofacial Surgery.
- 1994: Special Prize of the German Society for Plastic and Reconstructive Surgery.
- 2011: Professor Adalbert Seifriz Prize (Technology Transfer Prize of German Crafts).
- 2018: Badge of Honor of the German Dental Association.

== Selected books and publications ==
- with Birgit Zöller (ed.): Complementary Pain Therapy in Dentistry. Hippokrates Verlag, Stuttgart 1995, ISBN 978-3-7773-1132-6.
- On the Malignant Transformation of the Oral Mucosal Epithelium under Chemotherapy and Chemoprevention: Studies on Multicentric Carcinogenesis. Quintessenz-Verlag, Berlin 1995, ISBN 3-87652-083-5.
- with Stefan Haßfeld: Interactive Dental Implantology: Diagnostics, Planning, Surgery; the interactive teaching and learning medium with numerous voiced video sequences and animations for training and practice. Edited by Joachim E. Zöller. Hüthig-Verlag, Heidelberg / Hüthig 1999, ISBN 978-3-7785-3303-1 (Learning software, CD-ROM).
- with Alexander C. Kübler, Wilma D. Lorbeer, Joachim F. H. Mühling: Craniofacial Surgery. Thieme-Verlag, Stuttgart / New York 2003, ISBN 978-3-13-131391-1.
- mit Jörg Neugebauer: Digitale Volumentomografie in der Zahn-, Mund- und Kieferheilkunde. Grundlagen, Diagnostik und Behandlungsplanung. 2., vollständig neu bearbeitete Auflage. Quintessenz-Verlag, 2013, ISBN 978-3-86867-052-3.
- mit Jörg Neugebauer: Cone Beam Volumetric Imaging in Dental, Oral and Maxillofacial Medicine. Fundamentals, Diagnostics and Treatment Planning 2. Auflage. Quintessence Publishing, 2014, ISBN 978-1-85097-269-3.
- mit Nadine Beck, Christoph Laugs, Sören Riebenstahl, Christina Rosseaux, Lucia Seethaler: 200 Jahre organisierter Kölner Karneval, Die Geschichte des Kölner Karnevals und der ersten Traditionsgesellschaft „Die Grosse von 1823 KG e. V. Köln". Herausgegeben von Die Grosse von 1823 Karnevalsgesellschaft e. V. Köln, Jonas Verlag 2022, ISBN 978-3-89445-596-5.
