= Bicon Dental Implants =

- Company type: Private company
- Industry: Dental Implants and Dental Prosthetics.
- Founded: 1994
- Headquarters: Boston, Massachusetts, United States
- Area served: Worldwide
- Products: Dental implants implant abutments individualized CAD/CAM prosthetics (abutments, crowns, bridges, overdenture bars) components for guided surgery dental drills training and education for dental professionals

Bicon Dental Implants is a privately owned company located in Boston, MA. The company specializes in short dental implants that use a locking taper or cold welding connection to secure the abutment to the implant. Bicon is notable and worthy of mention for the following three reasons: First, Bicon implants are extremely short in length. The size of Bicon implants allow them to be placed in regions that are crowded with natural teeth and/or implants, or in regions that would otherwise require bone grafting. Second, the implants do not have the screw-form design typical of other available implants. Third, the abutments are connected to the implant via a locking taper. This is notable from both a medical and engineering standpoint as no other implant company offers an implant with a biological seal at the implant/abutment interface; almost all other implants possess an internal screw to connect their abutments.

== History ==
Bicon has been in operation since June 1994. Prior to Bicon, its main product line was under the ownership of two other entities, Driskell Bioengineering (1985–1987) and Stryker Corporation (1988–1994) of Kalamazoo Michigan. The following section briefly describes the history of the Bicon company and the dental implant products that it offers.

=== Vietnam War ===
The style of implant offered by Bicon can trace its provenance to the Battelle Memorial Institute in Columbus, Ohio, where in 1968 the US Army Medical Research and Development Command Dental Research Division funded a project aimed at developing prosthetics to address the influx of craniofacial injuries sustained by personnel in the escalating Vietnam War.

Research performed by the implant's inventor, Thomas Driskell, showed that a multi-finned plateau design more effectively distributed occlusal forces to the underlying bone as compared to contemporary screw form implants. Using rhesus monkeys as an experimental animal, Driskell et al. were able to demonstrate direct bone-to-implant contact in the plateau style implant, a process called osseointegration. Furthermore, the implant designed by Driskell possessed a sloping shoulder that, in later years, would be shown to play a role in the maintenance of crestal bone height and a natural looking interdental papillae.

With the advent of the 1970s, renewed interest in the use of ceramics began to develop. In 1975, Driskell et al. unveiled the Synthodont implant, an implant made of high density aluminum oxide (Al_{2}O_{3}). Unlike other conventional screw-type implants, the Synthodont implant design incorporated the use of the "fins" that had proved so successful in the U.S. Army project.

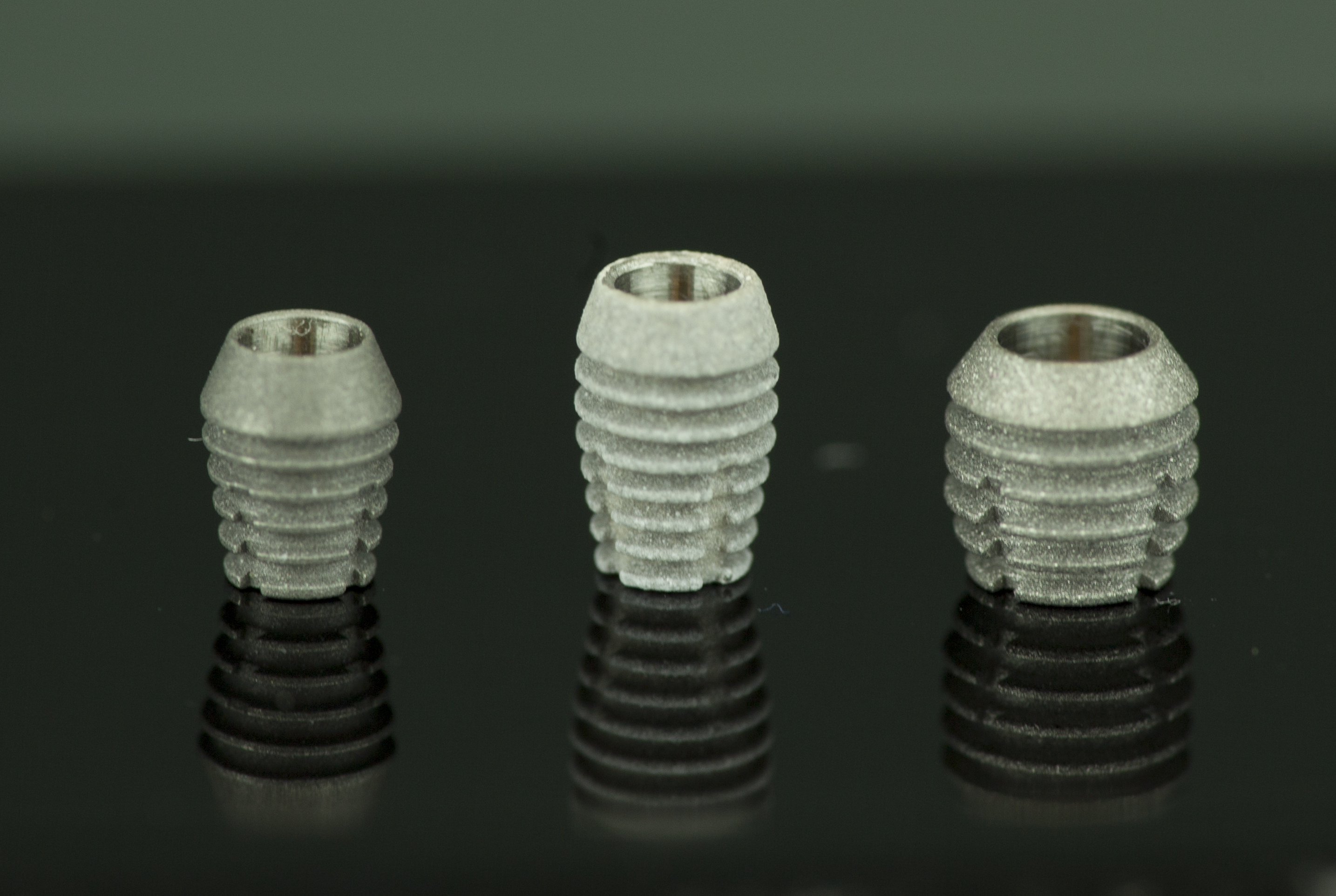
Plateau Root Form (PRF) or "finned" dental implants of three different sizes.

=== 1970s–1980s ===
In the late 1970s, following the initial successes of the Synthodont implant, Driskell et al. introduced the Titanodont implant. The Titanodont implant was composed of surgical grade titanium (grade 5, Ti-6Al-4V). The Titanodont implant was unique for three main reasons. First, the Titanodont implant allowed for complete interchangeability with abutments of varying diameters and angles. This interchangeability allowed for a more natural biological width. Second, the implant was grit blasted and acid etched, which provided both a larger surface area and preferable substrate for cells involved in osseointegration. Third, and perhaps most importantly, the Titanodont implant had a locking taper abutment connection, which allowed 360° of abutment positioning, along with a bacterial seal. Unlike screw-form implants, the locking taper connection design prevents the infiltration of bacteria into the implant crypt and surrounding tissues.

=== 1980s–1990s ===
In the mid-1980s, Driskell and his partners formed a company called DB Bioengineering. DB Bioengineering received pre-market notification in October, 1985 for the implant Driskell and his team had developed at Batelle – now known as the DB Precision Fin Implant System. Two short years later, in 1987, DB engineering – along with the DB Precision Fin Implant System – were sold to the multinational conglomerate, the Stryker Corporation. At this juncture, the DB Precision Fin Implant System possessed the qualities that separated it (along with modern Bicon implants) from its competitors: a sloping shoulder, specialized titanium instrumentation, and a slow speed drilling system. Slow speed drilling was included in order to prevent the thermal damage induced by the high speeds conventional drilling.

=== 1990s – Present day ===
Following its purchase from DB Bioengineering, Stryker held control of the DB Precision Fin Implant System for 7 years. Owing to its large size, as well as being more accustomed to dealing with purchasing agents at large hospitals, Stryker lacked the infrastructure necessary for direct interaction and sales with private practice dentists. In late 1993, Stryker made plans to sell the DB Precision Fin Implant System. Catching wind of the sale, Dr. Vincent Morgan along with other business partners, formed a group whose purpose was the acquisition of the implant system. In 1994, Stryker sold the DB Precision Fin Implant System to a group based in Boston which, at that point in time, had been renamed Bicon Dental Implants or simply Bicon (a name that is a portmanteau of the Latin "bi" – meaning two – and "con" – indicating the simple two-part design of the implant/abutment connection).

Bicon's headquarters are located in Jamaica Plain, a historic neighborhood in Boston, Massachusetts. The company offers their implant system in over 100 countries.

== Reception ==
Bicon has been called "the smallest of the large implant companies." Manufactured in the United States for over 30 years, Bicon implants have been generally well received. Because Bicon implants utilize a unique press-fit system instead of a screw, many clinicians have been hesitant to implement their use. Other clinicians praise the Bicon implant design for both its ease of use, versatility, and cost effectiveness. Like other dental companies that use or have used hydroxyapatite coated implants or hydroxyapatite derivatives (e.g. Zimmer, Straumann, Nobel Biocare, Dentsply, etc.), Bicon too has been criticized for the use of hydroxyapatite. Bicon implants have also been criticized for their small size; however, following a series of scientific studies, these concerns were shown to have been unwarranted.

Unbeknownst to its creators at the time, the Bicon implant design (i.e. namely the use of fins or plateaus, along with a hemispherical base) took advantage of a biological phenomenon called load bearing platform switching (LBPS). Briefly, platform switching occurs when the diameters of the implant and abutment are unequal. LBPS results when the hemispherical base of the abutment generates a load onto the tissue below it. This mechanical stimuli induces bone repair and maintenance and results in crestal bone gain coronal to the implant.

Bicon dental implants have been successfully functioning in patients since the inception of the product line in 1985. Implants retrieved after 18 years show evidence of lamellar bone consisting of multiple layers and multiple osteonic structures. Depending on the surgical procedure, implant size, implant coating, and patient, the long-term survival rate for Bicon dental implants ranges from 92.2% to 100%.

== Products ==
In addition to dental implants, Bicon also offers implant-abutments, β-tricalcium phosphate, and other dental restorative materials. As mentioned in the introduction, one of the reasons Bicon implants are notable (and also a source of criticism) is because of their small size. Bicon implants – referred to as short or ultrashort – can be as short as 5.0 mm. This allows the implants to be placed in regions that would otherwise require a sinus lift or bone graft.
