= Die Grosse von 1823 =

Carnival society in Germany

Die Grosse von 1823 Karnevalsgesellschaft e. V. Köln
- Established: 1823
- Legal status: registered non-profit association
- Purpose: Care and preservation of carnival traditions
- Leader: Univ.-Prof. Dr. Dr. Joachim E. Zöller
- Website: www.dgv-1823.de

Die Grosse von 1823 Carnival Society e. V. Cologne (English: The Great of 1823) is a carnival society in Cologne, Germany. It was the first of its kind, and since many others have emerged from it, it is also referred to in Cologne as the "mother of all carnival societies." It also holds the title The First Cologne Traditional Society.

== History ==
=== Founding ===
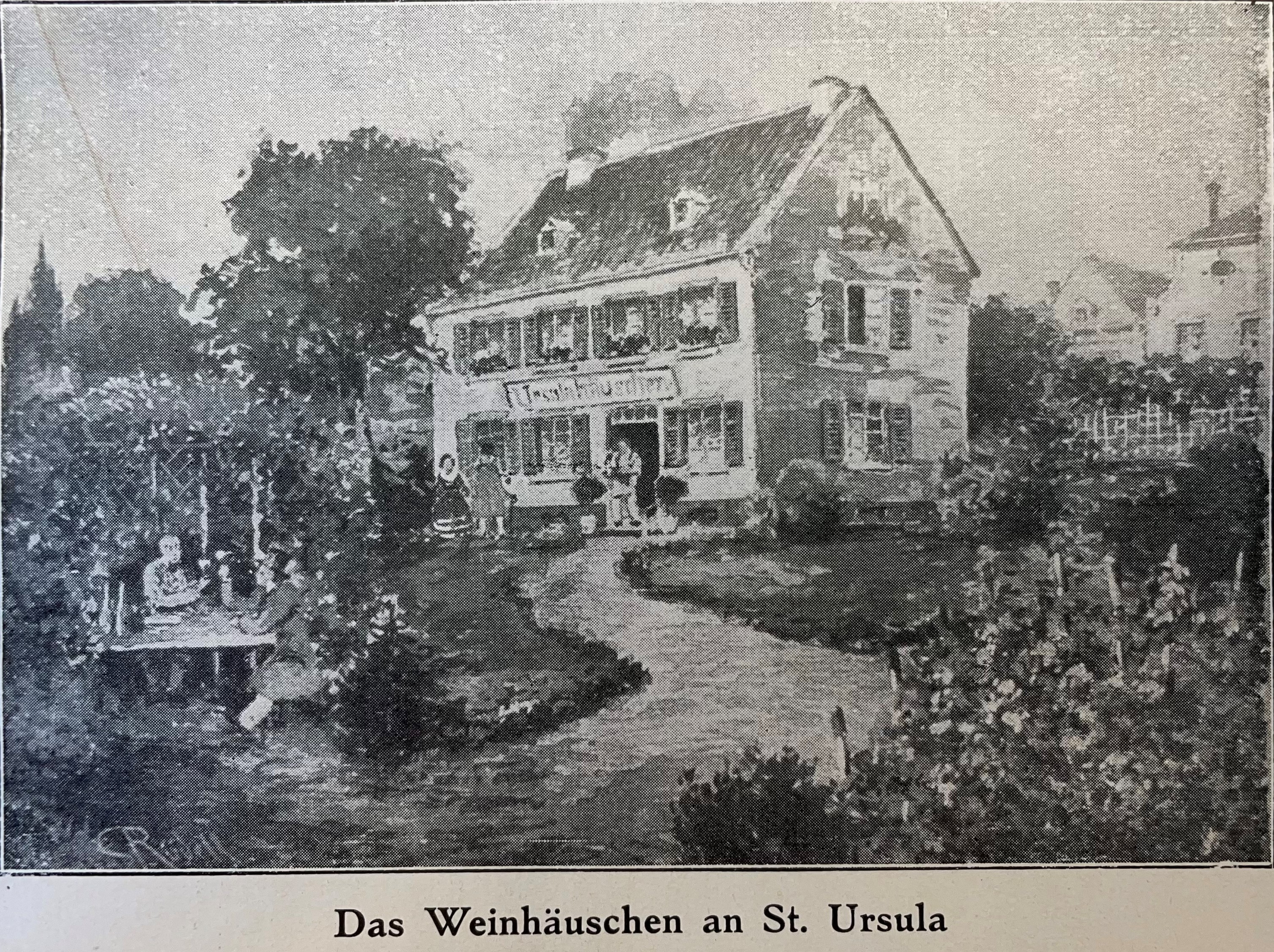
Wine house at St. Ursula, watercolor by Carl Rüdell

The poor harvests in 1816 and the difficult economic situation following the Wars of Liberation also had an impact on the Cologne Carnival. Due to the high costs, less money was invested in the design and creativity of the costumes. Therefore, in November 1822, a first meeting was held to counter this. The aim of the founders of this Great Carnival Society was to

“give Carnival a nobler form, more in keeping with the current times, to lift it intellectually out of its decline, to shape it, so to speak, poetically”.

A large masked parade was to be organized for Carnival Monday in 1823, on the occasion of which the Great Carnival Society (today's Die Grosse von 1823) was founded.

The first meeting took place in November 1822 at the little wine house at St. Ursula, probably at the present-day “Brauhaus Schreckenskammer“, likely initiated by members of the Cologne Olympic Society, Ferdinand Franz Wallraf, Matthias Joseph de Noël and their circle of friends, as well as members of the literary circle, who provided the ideas for the festival arrangements. Among them were, for example, Ernst Weyden, Christian Samuel Schier, Johann Baptist Rousseau, Wilhelm Smets, Johann Baptist Farina and Emanuel Ciolina Zanoli. Carnival Monday was probably chosen because it had so far been the quietest of the three carnival days and to avoid the suspicion of displacing the many small parades of the smaller masked societies. After twelve weeks of preparation, the first Cologne Rose Monday Parade took place on February 10, 1823.

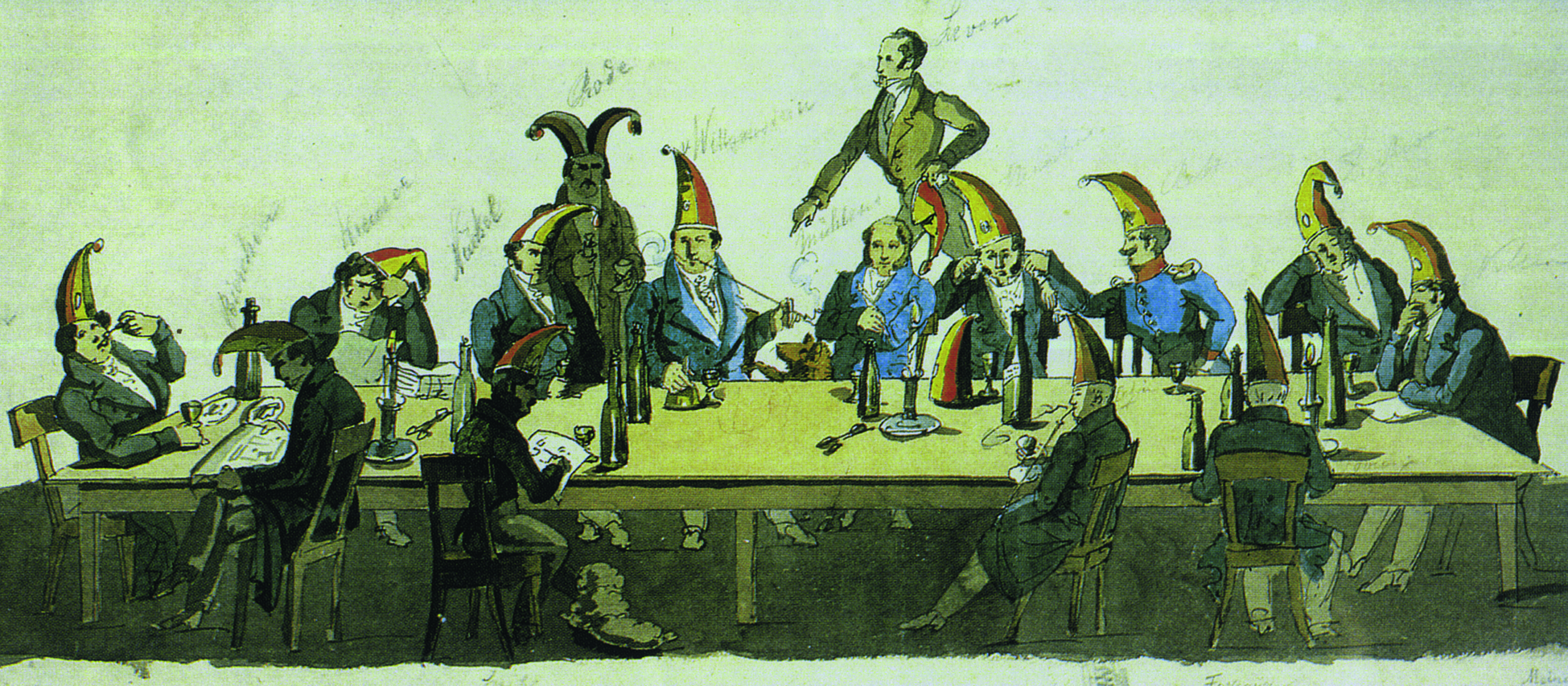
Meeting of the board of the Great Carnival Society Die Grosse von 1823 (including the President von Wittgenstein) for the first time with caps. The idea for these caps goes back to the Prussian Major General Karl Heinrich von Czettritz und Neuhaus 1827.

From the following year, the members of the Great Carnival Society met annually around New Year's for a general assembly (also called the "Grand Council") to elect from among themselves a "Festival Organizing Committee" ("Small or Merry Council"), which was to take over the organization of the following carnival celebration. Heinrich von Wittgenstein was elected as the first president and speaker. The membership fee of three talers ensured a high exclusivity of the society, as not even five percent of Cologne's citizens could demonstrate an annual income of 400 talers or more.

From 1824 onwards, a grand masked ball was held annually on Rosenmontag at the Gürzenich as a finale, from whose proceeds the expenses for the Carnival days could be covered. The surplus was donated to charitable causes each time. In gratitude, the city administration provided the society with the main hall of the Gürzenich free of charge.

=== 1823 to 1934 ===
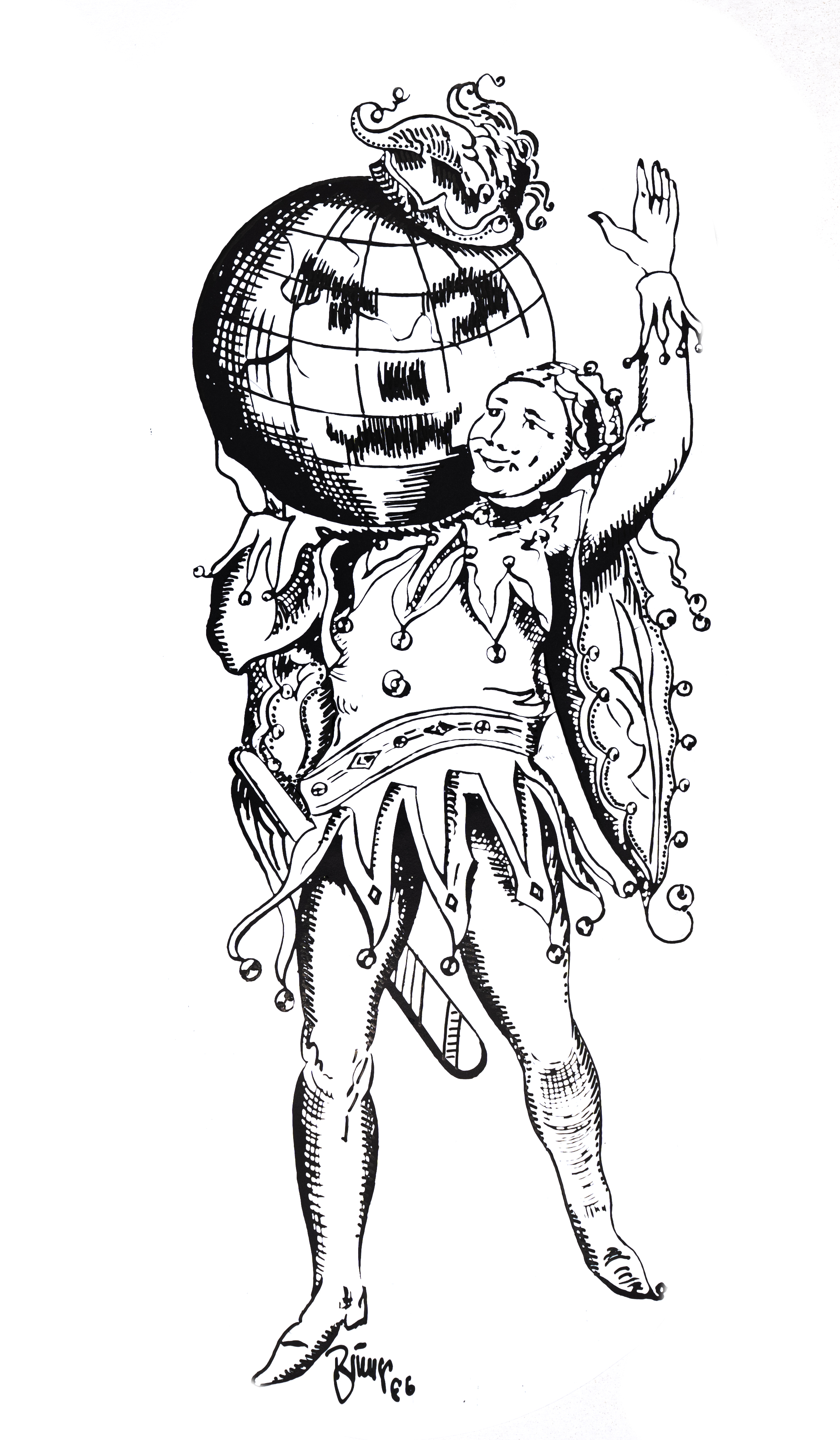
The logo and motto of the CS “The world belongs to the fool” – a drawing from the year 1886.

Before 1848, carnival societies were generally only allowed to form for the carnival season by official regulations and had to dissolve every year on Ash Wednesday. The first Cologne Carnival Society (CS) enjoyed such privileged treatment by the authorities at least until 1840 that it apparently did not need to apply for police approval as an association. Since numerous figures from the city administration and business were members of the Cologne KG, no police review or explicit approval was required.

The club's membership numbers rose quickly: In 1824, the Cologne KG still had 109 members, by 1827 it already had 302, and by 1829 over 500 members. After the city of Cologne set up a club register, the association was entered as the first carnival society in 1844. After 1871, uniformed carnival guards and corps societies became increasingly popular. The Traditional Corps Rote Funken (Red Sparks) were a group within the Grosse KG for almost fifty years until they founded their own carnival association in 1869. Shortly before the First World War, the Grosse Karnevalsgesellschaft, with over a thousand members, was among the largest Cologne carnival societies.

In 1882, the club split, as President August Wilcke resigned from his position after internal disputes and, together with his supporters, founded his own society, the Cologne Carnival Society. Fritz Hönig was elected as the new president of the Große. Now, two major carnival clubs claimed the leading position in the carnival, which led to difficulties in the organization of the festivities and events, resulting in 1883 – similar to 1844 and 1845 – two large masked parades taking place in Cologne.

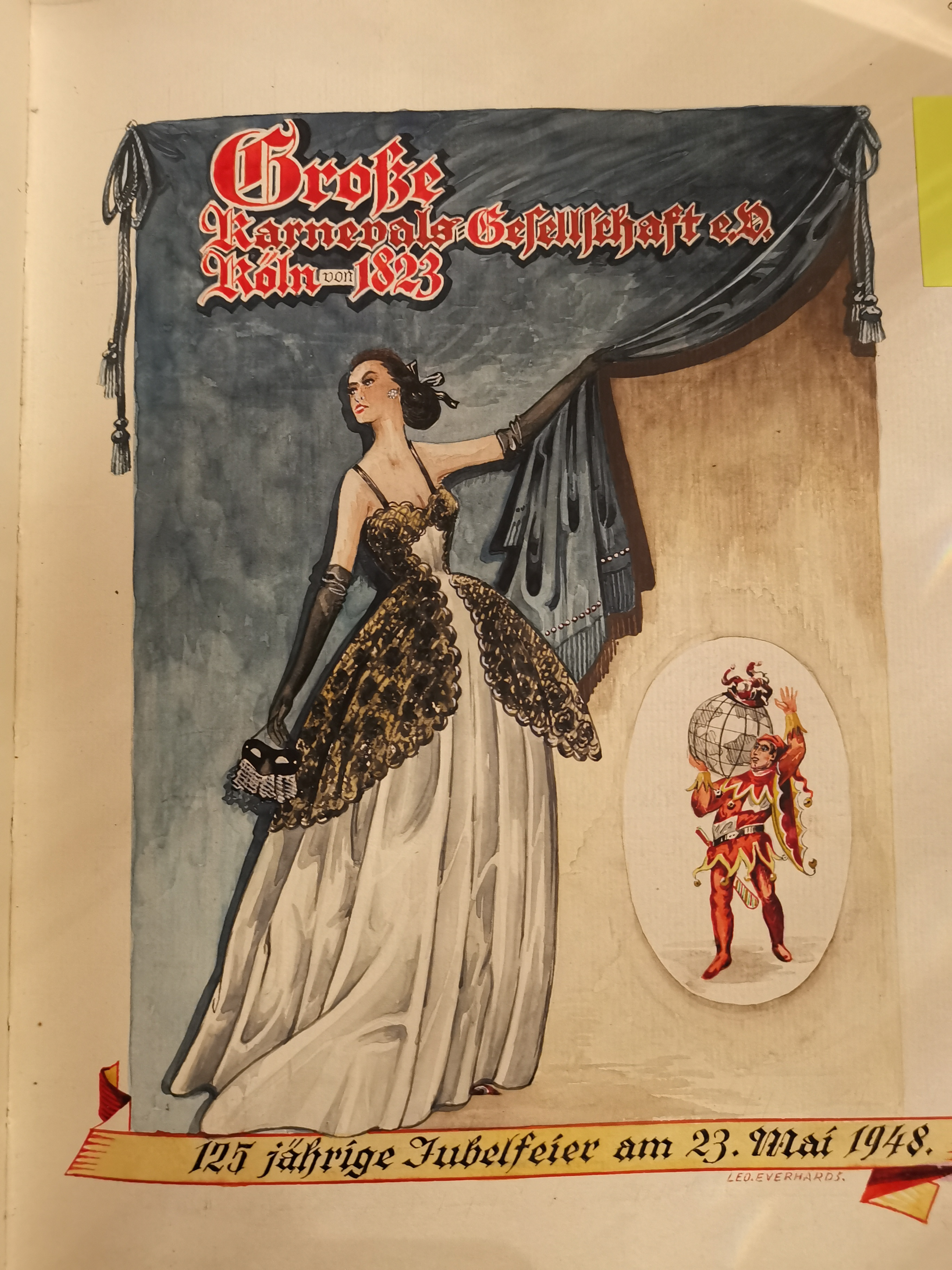
Before the first Rose Monday parade after the war in 1949, the Great Carneval Society celebrated its 125th anniversary in 1948

In 1888, Mayor Karl Ferdinand Thewalt and Fritz Hönig mediated between the boards of the two associations, and finally, in January 1888, they agreed to jointly form a "Mask Parade Committee" chaired by Hönig. For the first time in 1888, it was no longer the Große KG that led the mask parade, but a festival committee (today: Festival Committee Cologne Carnival) of the two associations. In the following years, the festival committee became a permanent institution, with the two major carnival societies jointly determining the organization of the festivities.

In 1889, the Festival Organizing Committee was entered in the register of associations, with the president of the Grosse KG continuing to serve simultaneously as president of the Festival Organizing Committee until 1908. Then the two major carnival societies agreed on an annual rotation of the presidency of the Cologne Festival Committee. In 1934, the Grosse still celebrated its 111th anniversary largely unhindered by the political upheavals following the Nazi seizure of power.

=== 1948 to Today ===
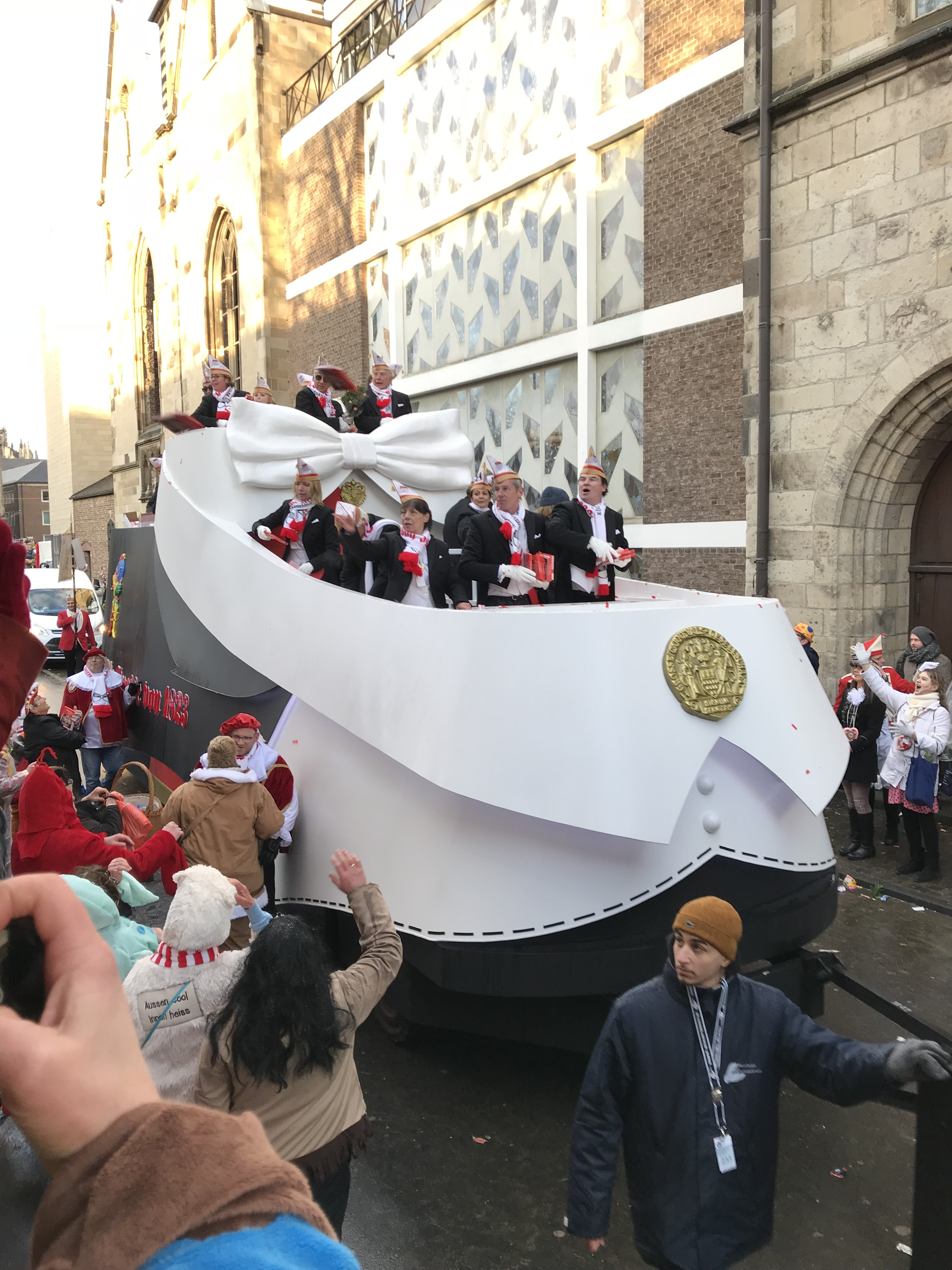
The new float (2018)

After the Second World War, a Rose Monday parade was held again only in 1949 as an extended mask parade under the motto "Mer sin widder do un dun wat mer künne" (We are back and do what we can). In 1949, the club also participated, together with other carnival societies and students, in clearing away the rubble caused by the war damage at the Gürzenich.

In 1961, the society presented the prince with Peter Schumacher, the farmer with Paul Olpp, and the maiden of the Cologne Trifolium with Josef Schneider. In 1969, the Great Carneval Society renamed itself to Die Grosse von 1823. From 1971 onwards, the senators of this Societye wore the neck order, which was based on the oldest known society badge of the Große from 1823. To kick off the anniversary session, in 1972, during its 149th year, the society once again presented a Cologne Dreigestirn (trifoliumn or triumvirate) with Bernd Beckers as Cologne Prinz (Prince) Bernd I, Adam de Haas as Cologne Bauer (peasant) Adam, and Josef Kreimer as Jungfrau (maiden) Josi.

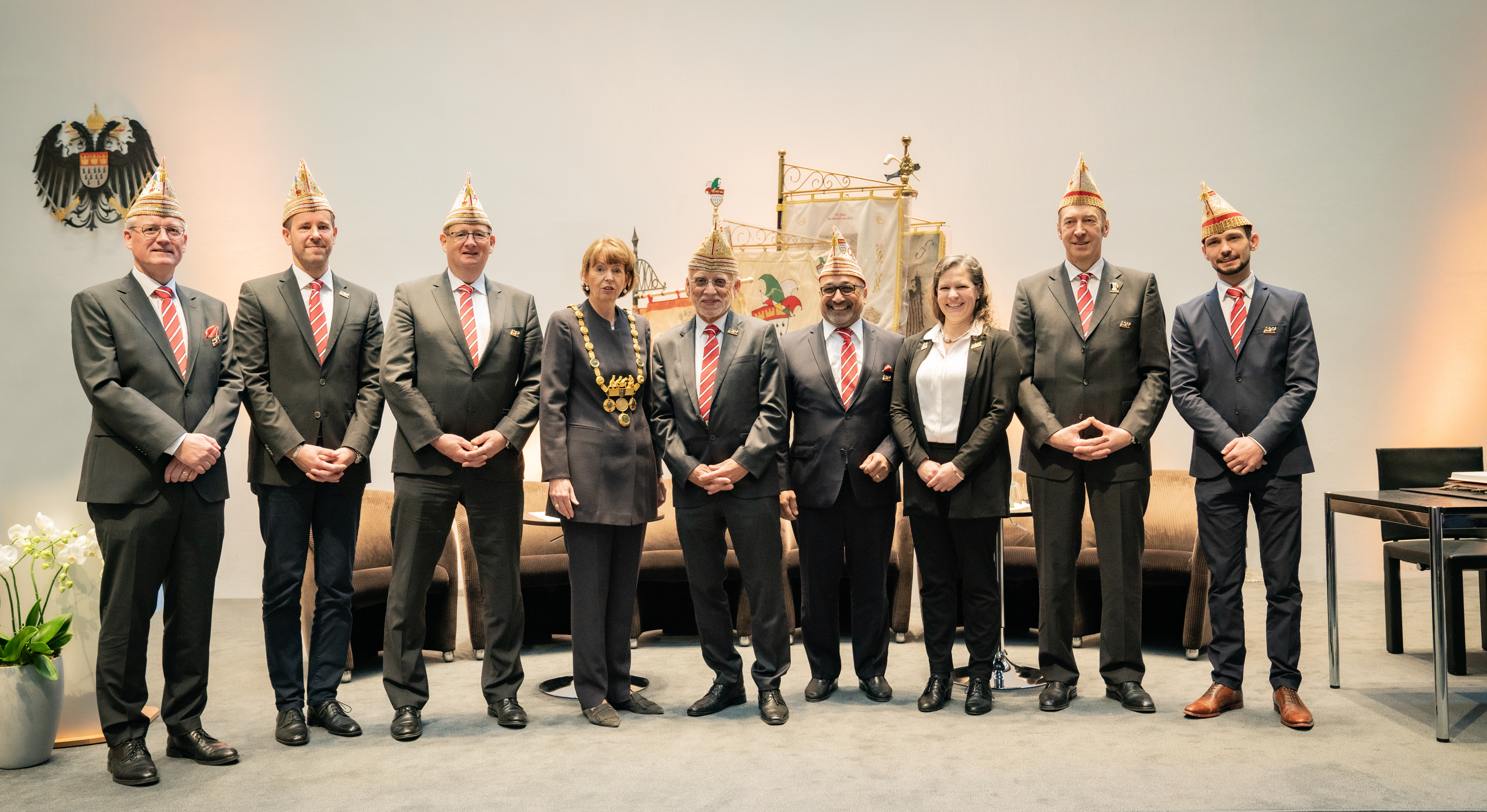
Reception of the board by the mayor of Cologne Henriette Reker on the occasion of the 200th anniversary and entry into the Golden Book of the City of Cologne (2022)

At the beginning of 2015, Henriette Reker, later Mayor of the City of Cologne, became the first woman to be appointed "Honorary Senator" since the founding of the society. Since November 2021, women have also been able to become members as "senators". For the 200th anniversary of the society, the history of the Cologne Carnival and the first traditional society was scientifically documented.

== The Golden Book ==
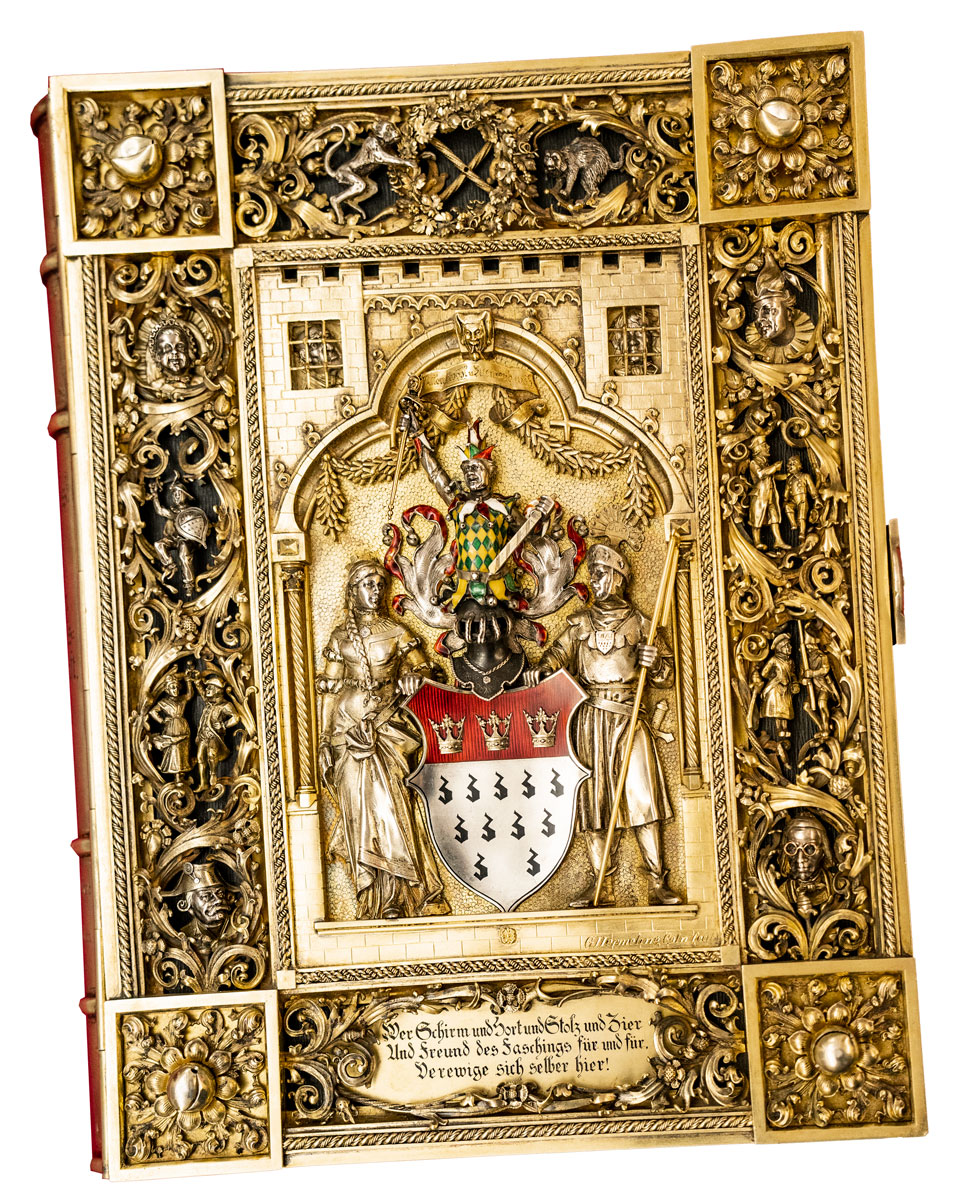
The “Golden Book” of the society

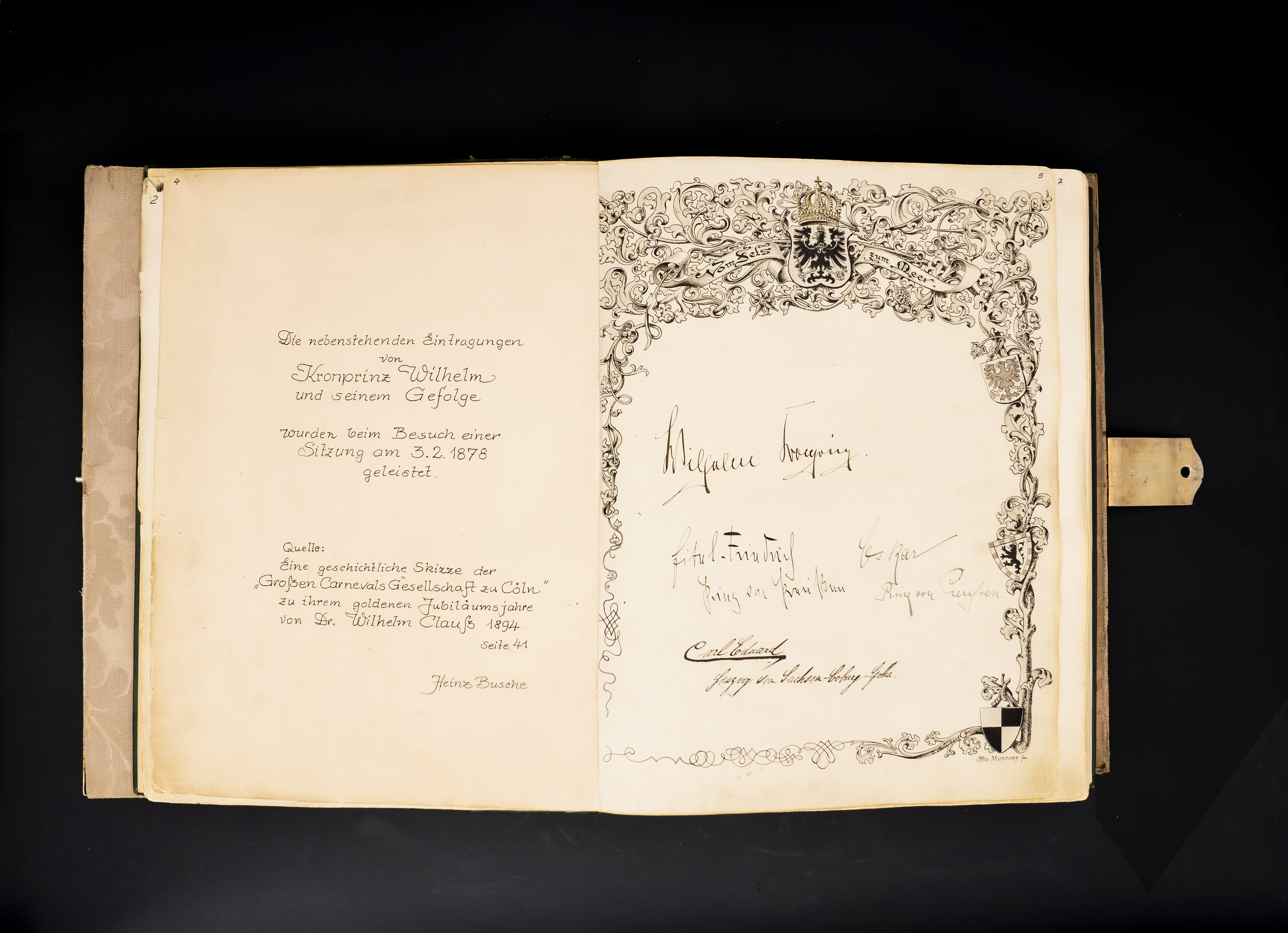
The first entry by Crown Prince Wilhelm (later Emperor Wilhelm II.) from the year 1878

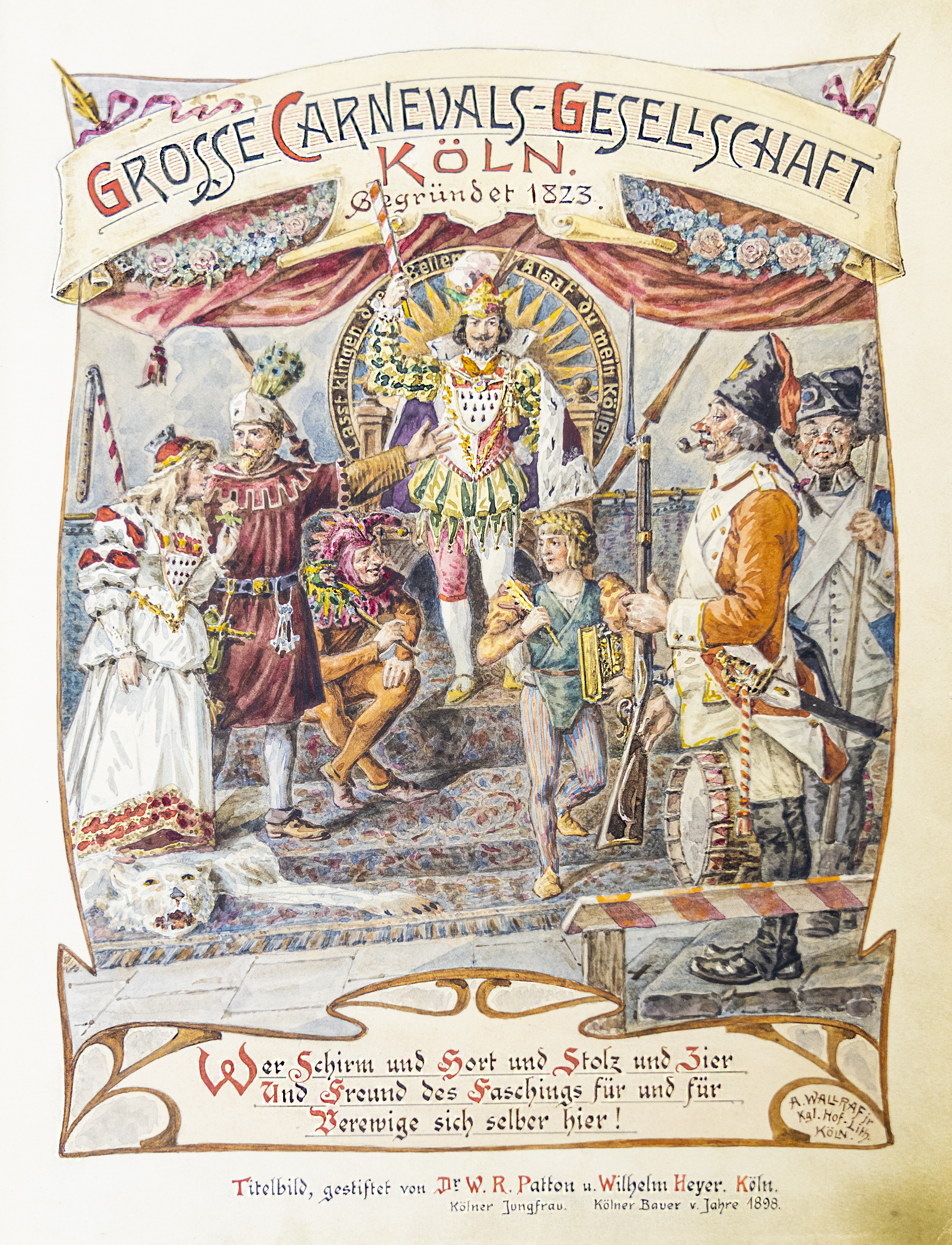
Title page of the Golden Book with Prince, Peasant, and Maiden of the year 1898

The Golden Book (guestbook) is the flagship of the carnival society. It is repeatedly made available to art-historically interested professionals for research purposes. Other items, such as the president's scepter, the anniversary trophy, and the golden cup from the "vault," have also become known beyond Cologne. The Song and Yearbook from 1905 reports on this:

"From the council treasury of the Grand Carnival Society, various showpieces that came from the atelier of the court goldsmith Gabriel Hermeling had made the long journey across the world's oceans to represent Cologne's goldsmithing art at the World's Fair in St. Louis. The golden book with the golden inkwell and golden blotter, the president's scepter, the city's anniversary trophy, and the president's golden cup thus simultaneously carried the fame of our magnificent 'Grand Society' to the world. And, having been awarded the 'Grand Prix,' they returned to the society just before the end of the season."

== Society and Events ==
The society is composed of several communities that together form the Grosse Famillich (Great Family). This includes Die Grosse von 1823 Karnevalsgesellschaft e. V. Köln, the society's dance group, the dance corps "Fidele Sandhasen", as well as the music corps Schwarz-Rot Köln e. V. The society is supported by the friends and sponsorship circle FFK e. V. as well as by the Grosse Centuria, founded in 2019, a community promoting Cologne's carnival culture. In addition to the family-friendly large-scale and charity event Der Grosse Kölsche Countdown on 11.11. at the Tanzbrunnen, the Famillich also organizes #ufftata Die Grosse Countdown Party at the Theater im Tanzbrunnen for younger carnival-goers.

With its traditional session formats (girls' session, costume session, Sunday session), which have always taken place at the Cologne Gürzenich, the society nurtures the Cologne carnival sessions. The session on the evening of Carnival Sunday is traditionally the last carnival session of all societies in Cologne. During this session, the president of the society pins the "fifth feather" to the prince's hat, with which he participates in the Rose Monday Parade the following day. This symbolic act serves to thank the prince and his team for the season on behalf of all Cologne carnival societies.

Furthermore, the society also organizes the Kölsche Nostalgiesitzung at the Flora (Cologne) and, since 2023, together with the Allgemeiner Verein der Karnevalsfreunde e. V. (AVDK) from 1829 Düsseldorf, a joint Große Kostümsitzung Helau – Alaaf at the Gürzenich every two years. For the first time on Weiberfastnacht 2024, the society held an alternative event on Hohenstaufenring.

== Presidents and Chairpersons ==
- 1823–1836: Heinrich von Wittgenstein
- 1836–1847: Peter Leven
- 1847–1848: Phillip Hofmann
- 1848–1849: H. J. Schenk
- 1849–1853: Jakob Fürth
- 1853–1858: Roderich Benedix
- 1855–1858: Rudolf von Hallberg
- 1858–1862: Phillip Hoffmann
- 1862–1863: Andreas Pütz
- 1863–1864: Advocatanwalt DuMont
- 1864–1865: W. Kaulen & P. Kamp
- 1865–1882: August Wilcke
- 1882–1883: Fritz Hönig
- 1883–1891: Emanuel Mosler
- 1891–1897: Peter Prior
- 1897–1900: Wilhelm Wildt
- 1900–1906: Jean Jörissen
- 1906–1908: Wilhelm Wildt
- 1908–1909: Josef Böhmer
- 1909–1912: Gerhard Becker
- 1912–1926: Karl Umbreit
- 1926–1932: Reinhold Weber
- 1932–1953: Michael Hollmann
- 1953–1954: Theo Röhrig
- 1954–1966: Jupp Fabry
- 1966–1969: Heinz Glebsattel
- 1969–1975: Hermann Forstbach
- 1975–1983: Heinz Schüller
- 1983–1988: Werner Lissem
- 1988–1992: Adam de Haas
- 1992–2001: Joseph Söller
- 2001–2002: Engelbert Bender
- 2002–2012: Hartmut Jarofke
- seit 2012: Joachim E. Zöller
