= European Association of Dental Implantologists =

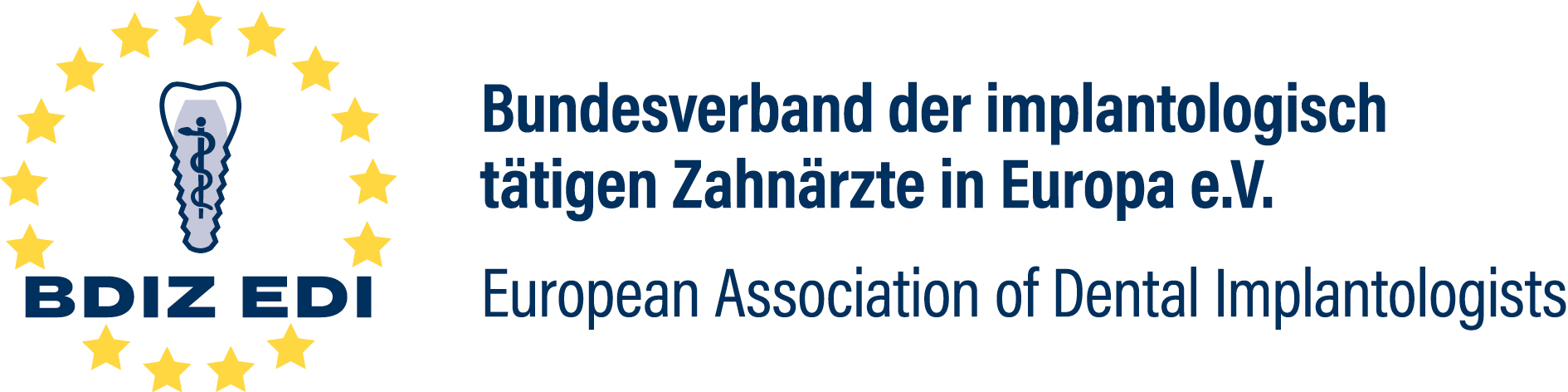
- Abbreviation: BDIZ EDI
- Established: 1989
- Legal status: registered association
- Purpose: Representation of interests for dentists practicing implantology
- Members: about 6.000
- Leader: Christian Berger
- Website: bdizedi.org

The European Association of Dental Implantologists (EDI) is the oldest advocacy organization of its kind in Germany. In addition to education and advanced training in dental implantology, it advocates for a scientifically grounded and practice-oriented system for expert appraisal. The association is recognized as a nonprofit organization.

== History ==
On 30 September 1989, in Frankfurt am Main, the “European Association of Dental Implantologists” (BDIZ EDI) was founded. In 1982 implantology was recognized as an independent scientific discipline, and in 1988 its services were first included in the German Fee Schedule for Dentists (GOZ). Since 2002 the association has been known as the European Association of Dental Implantologists in Europe (BDIZ EDI) due to its European openness.

From the outset, the BDIZ campaigned to enable every dentist to perform implantological procedures in their practice and to provide post-graduate, practice-oriented continuing education for implant care. Legal disputes over the interpretation of new fee items between the dental profession and private health insurance companies necessitated sound legal advice, long provided by attorney Thomas Ratajczak. He spearheaded the establishment of the “focus of activity: Implantology” before the Federal Constitutional Court in 2001, and in 2012 represented the constitutional complaint against the GOZ before this court; since 2023 he has also handled the non-activity complaint against the Federal Ministry of Health before the Administrative Court in Berlin. The BDIZ EDI has therefore consistently been the leading body in legal matters affecting implantology. The association has also engaged in public affairs at the European level. The BDIZ EDI awards its Honorary Medal to distinguished individuals.

== Advocacy ==
The European Association of Dental Implantologists (BDIZ EDI) offers a broad spectrum of knowledge, support, and services for all dental practices, with emphasis on.

- postgraduate, practice-oriented training in implant surgery and implant prosthetics
- billing for dental services with all legal aspects of treatment and remuneration
- improvement of treatment quality with a focus on ongoing development of implant care (scientific and patient-centered)

== Associated partner associations or advocacy groups ==
- Association of Dental Implantology UK (ADI UK)
- Ogolnopolskie Stowarzyszenie Implantolgii Stomatologicznej (OSIS EDI)
- Sociedad Española de Implantes (SEI)
- Sociedade Portuguesa de Cirurgia Oral (SPCO)
- Udruzenje Stomatologa Implantologa Srbije - EDI (USSI EDI)
- BIN EDI Netherlands
- EDI of Macedonia (EDIOFMAC)
- EDI India

== Duties of the BDIZ EDI ==
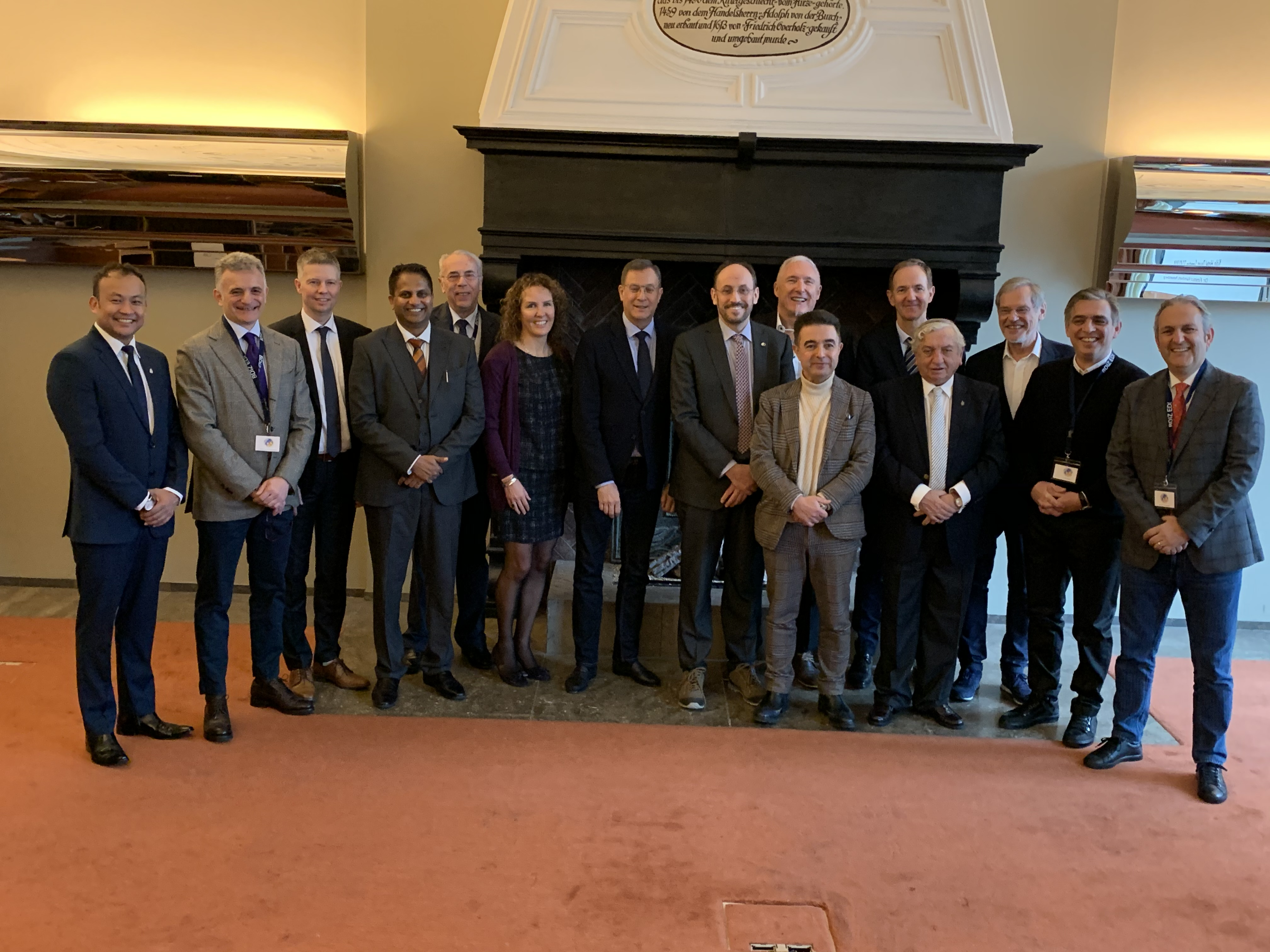
Members of the European Consensus Conference (EUCC) 2020 (under the leadership of BDIZ EDI)

- further development of treatment quality and materials through annually published practice guidelines on current topics in implant treatment, e.g. within the European Consensus Conference: Guidelines, and quality tests by the Q&R Committee

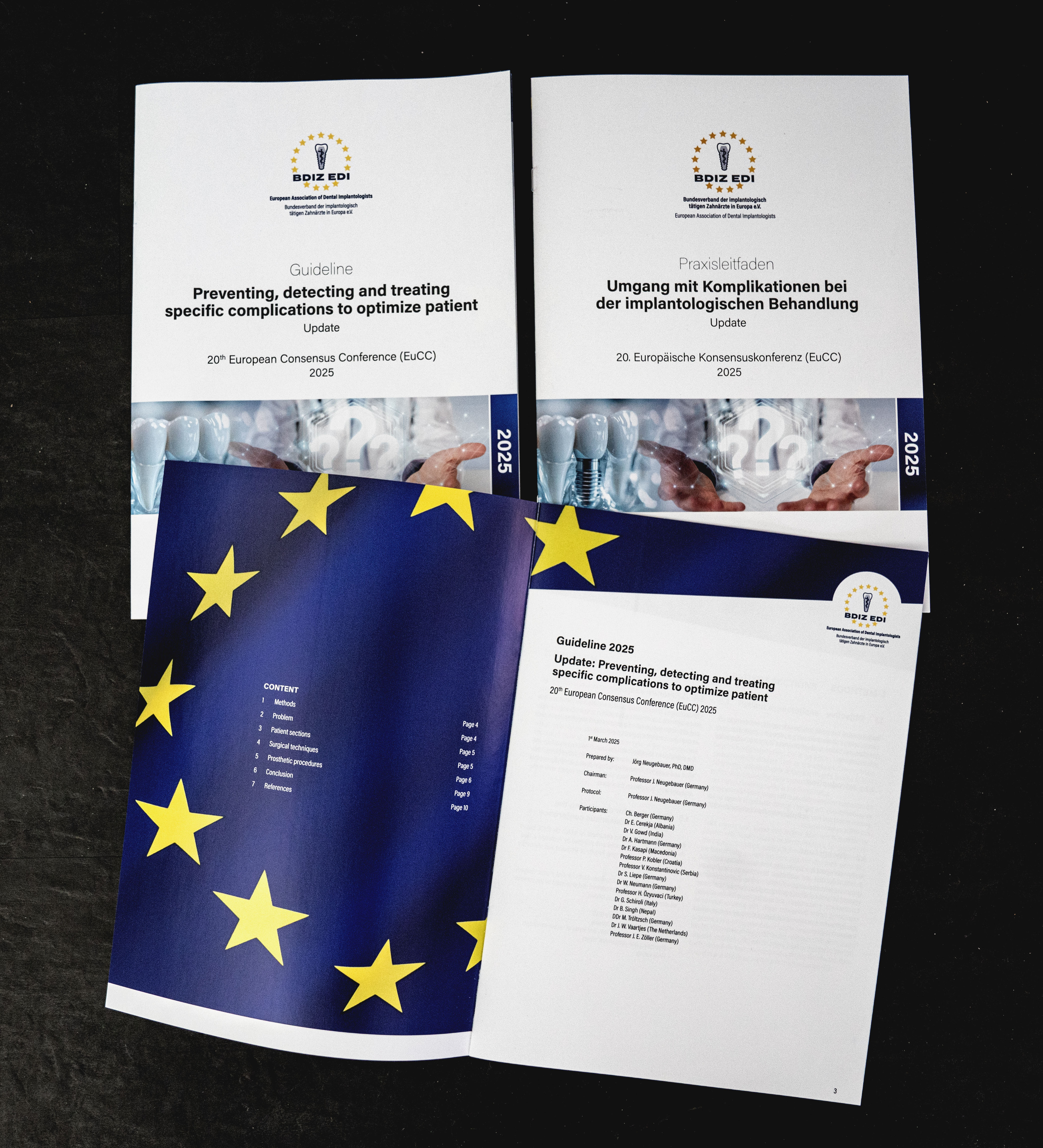
20th European Consensus Conference (EuCC) 2025

- practical postgraduate education based on scientifically grounded findings
- basic training of new professionals in oral implantology through annual curricula
- coordination and advancement of implant treatment in cooperation with the Consensus Conference Implantology
- support in the private dental billing and legal matters, including legal actions
- training of implantology assessors on behalf of the Consensus Conference Implantology
- improvement of implant care together with associated partner associations at European and international levels
- influence on German and European level laws affecting dentists
- assistance to patients in finding an implantologist

The BDIZ EDI publishes quarterly BDIZ EDI konkret in German, Journal for Implantology Practice, and the English-language EDI Journal.

== Structure of the nonprofit association ==
The president is Christian Berger, with vice-president Joachim E. Zöller, focusing on scientific continuing education. The term of office is four years. As of 31 December 2024, the total membership stood at 7,093, including 3,162 from abroad; about half of German members practiced in their own clinics.

== Chairs/Presidents ==
- 1989–1993: Egon Brinkmann
- 1993–2000: Hans-Jürgen Hartmann
- 2000–2005: Helmut B. Engels
- since 2005: Christian Berger

== Literature and sources ==
- Helmut B Engels: Handbook for the BDIZ/EDI Implant Registry. BDIZ EDI, basic.dent-Verlag, 4th edition, 2003.
- Thomas Ratajczak: Billing Handbook Implantology. BDIZ EDI, Quintessenz-Verlag, 2nd edition, 2004.
- Thomas Ratajczak: Expert Handbook Implantology. BDIZ EDI, basic.dent Publishing, 2005, ISBN 3-00-015997-5.
- Christian Berger, Thomas Ratajczak, Joachim E. Zöller: The AbI – Billing Manual for Implantology. Special Edition. Ed.: BDIZ EDI, Quintessenz Publishing, 2nd edition, 2009, ISBN 978-3-86867-007-3.
- Christian Berger, Thomas Ratajczak, Joachim E. Zöller: Billing Manual for Implantology – The New Commentary. Ed.: BDIZ EDI, Quintessenz Publishing, 2nd edition, 2010, ISBN 978-3-938947-22-7.
- Christian Berger, Thomas Ratajczak: GOZ Compendium 2012. Teamwork Media, 2012, ISBN 3-932599-31-4.
