= Implant-abutment junction =

This dental radiograph displays two identical 5.0 mm diameter Biomet 3i tapered dental implants placed into the lower right mandible. Implants are indicated by yellow brackets while abutments are indicated by orange brackets. The healing abutment on the more posterior implant [left] is platform matched (it shares the same 5.0 mm diameter as the implant platform), while the healing abutment on the more anterior implant [right] is platform switched (it possesses a 4.1 mm diameter). Because the implant to the right is platform switched, its IAJ is more distinct.

In implant dentistry, the implant-abutment junction (IAJ) refers to the location of intimate contact between a dental implant and its restorative abutment.

The IAJ is a focus of much attention because its morphology and location tend to affect the amount of bone resorption during the initial period of crestal bone changes immediately following implant placement.

== See also ==
- Platform switching
