= Platform switching =

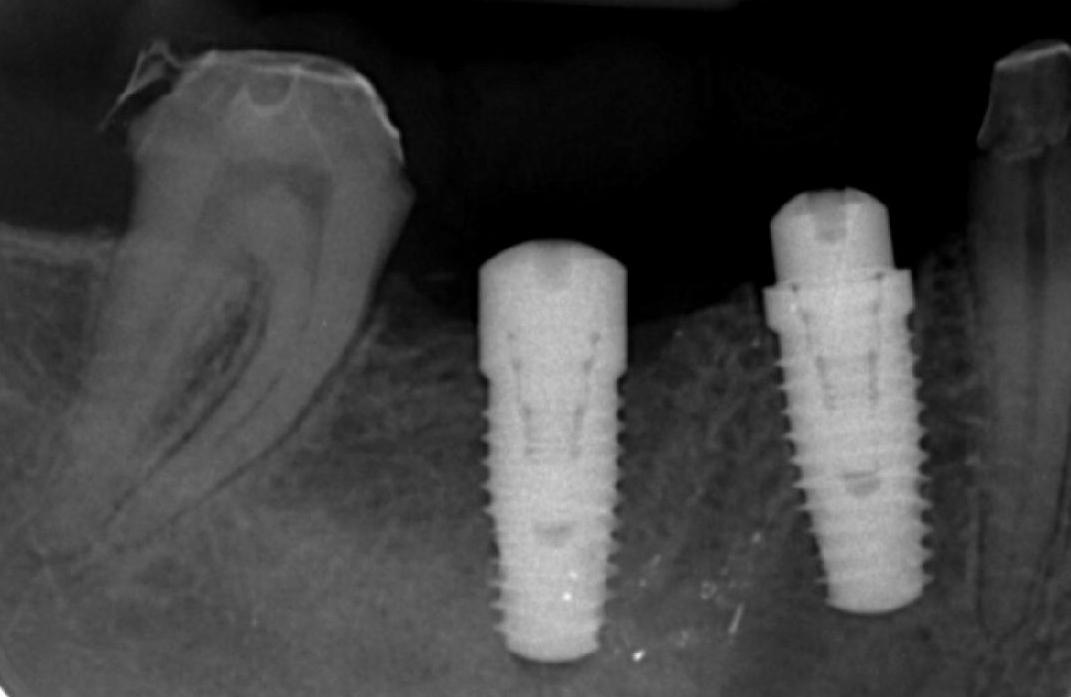
This dental radiograph displays two identical 5.0 mm diameter Biomet 3i tapered dental implants placed into the lower right mandible. The healing abutment on the more posterior implant [left] is platform matched (it shares the same 5.0 mm diameter as the implant platform), while the healing abutment on the more anterior implant [right] is platform switched (it possesses a 4.1 mm diameter).

In dentistry, platform switching is a method used to preserve alveolar bone levels around dental implants. The concept refers to placing screwed or friction fit restorative abutments of narrower diameter on implants of wider diameter, rather than placing abutments of similar diameters, referred to as platform matching.

Discovered by accident in the late 1980s, the benefits of platform switching have become the focus of implant-related research with increasing frequency. Numerous peer-reviewed articles and recent systematic reviews have revealed that platform switching can be considered a means of preventing initial peri-implant bone loss.

== Concept ==
After being placed in a surgical procedure, dental implants undergo osseointegration, during which time the surrounding bone grows into intimate contact with the surface of the implants and the implants become fused to the bone. When this process has been deemed to have occurred to a sufficient extent, the implants are fitted with restorative abutments in order to allow dental restorations (e.g. crowns, dentures, etc.) to be cemented on, screwed down or otherwise attached.

Historically, the diameter of the abutment matched the diameter of the implant platform; for example, a 4.8 mm-wide abutment was placed on a 4.8 mm-wide implant—this can be termed platform-matching.

When platform switching, a narrower abutment diameter for a given implant platform diameter is used; for example, a 4.8 mm-wide implant may be restored with a 3.8 mm-wide or 4.2 mm-wide abutment.

== History ==
The introduction of wide-diameter dental implants in the late 1980s created a situation in which mismatched standard-diameter abutments were used simply because of the lack of commercial availability of components to match the wide-diameter implants. Serendipitously, it was found that these implants exhibited less-than-expected initial crestal bone loss—the effect of bone modeling at the crest of the alveolar bone into which dental implants are placed—during healing. Several early clinical reports demonstrated enhanced soft (gingiva) and hard (bone) tissue responses to these platform switched implants, leading many implant companies to incorporate platform switching into their implant systems even for narrower-body implants.

== Rationale ==
It has been observed that some degree of bone resorption occurs at the crest of bone following implant placement. Through extensive investigation, it has been discovered that the extent of bone resorption is related to both the texture of the surfaces of the implant and abutment at and the morphology of the implant-abutment junction (IAJ). A number of investigators have zeroed in on the proposed inflammatory cell infiltrate that forms a zone around the IAJ. Although not yet fully understood, the current theory of the benefit of platform switching is related to the physical repositioning of the IAJ away from the outer edge of the implant and the surrounding bone, thereby containing the inflammatory infiltrate within the width of the platform switch.

In line with the supposed mechanism of action, it is not merely the introduction of a platform switch, but the magnitude of the implant-abutment diameter mismatch, that makes a difference. Difference in bone levels became statistically significant when the implant-abutment diameter mismatch was greater than 0.8 mm, providing a 0.4 mm circumferential width of platform switch when the center of the abutment is aligned with and fixed to the center of the implant.

== Proposed benefits ==
X indicates the vertical dimension known as biologic width, while Y indicates the horizontal component of the biologic width. (Legend: Bone is purple, implant is gray)

=== Biologic width ===
Very much like teeth, implants exposed to the oral cavity exhibit what is known as a minimum biologic width. Biologic width is the minimum thickness of soft tissue that envelops the alveolar bone that surrounds teeth and into which endosseous dental implants are placed, and has classically been described as having a mean of 2.04 mm: 0.97 mm of epithelium and 1.07 mm of underlying soft connective tissue.

Around implants, biologic width formation has classically led to about 1.5 - 2 mm of bone loss in the vertical dimension at the coronal aspect of the implants because the abutment that attaches to the implant was often removed many times to allow for impression taking, abutment changing and other related clinical functions. As such, the epithelial and connective tissue protection for the bone was unable to reliably form on the continuously disrupted abutment attachment surface and in reaction to this, bone loss occurred on the implant in order to provide the dimension necessary for the epithelium and soft connective tissue attachment to the implant fixture itself—this defined early implant placement and was often colloquially referred to as "bone loss to the first thread." This vertical loss of bone (X in the diagram at right) diminishes the bone-to-implant contact, contributing to a potential decrease in long-term biomechanical stability and has been well researched.

=== Horizontal component of biologic width ===
Recently, the lateral extent of this vertical bone loss around implants has been investigated—in other words, the thickness of bone loss that exists as a halo around the implant at its most coronal aspect—and has been termed the horizontal component of the biologic width (Y in the diagram at right), and research reveals that it is approximately 1.4 mm.

=== Horizontal component affecting crestal bone loss between adjacent implants ===
Crestal bone height as a function of distance between implants.
Distance between implants	Bone loss
≤3 mm apart (n=25)	1.04 mm
>3 mm apart (n=11)	0.45 mm

Because of this established mean horizontal dimension of the immediate crestal bone loss around dental implants, an issue arises when implants are placed into adjacent sites in the mouth. If the implants are placed too closely together, the overlap of the horizontal components of each implant's biologic width serves to increase the effective vertical crestal bone loss between the implants. This was first reported by Dennis Tarnow et al. in 2000 in a study that demonstrated that the distance between the most coronal aspect of the inter-implant bone and an imaginary line drawn between the implant platforms was greater when adjacent implants were placed ≤3 mm apart.

Increased loss of inter-implant bone in the vertical dimension due to this overlap of horizontal components of the adjacent implants' biologic width can have ramifications in the anterior esthetic zone because it decreases bony support for the interproximal papilla between implants. By platform switching, implants can be placed closer to teeth and to each other while maintaining more crestal bone.

=== Horizontal component affecting buccal plate in narrow alveolar crests ===
Another clinical example in which the horizontal extent of crestal bone loss due to biologic width formation can negatively affect the peri-implant bony architecture is a situation in which the buccal plate of the alveolar process is very thin and lies wholly or substantially within the halo of the horizontal component of the biologic width. If an implant is placed within 1.5 mm of the facial aspect of the buccal plate, it will be obliterated for a vertical distance of approximately 1.5-2 mm by the formation of the biologic width on the body of the implant fixture, which can lead to complications related to esthetics and long-term maintenance.

=== Platform switching and the vertical component of biologic width ===
Because the abutment is narrower in diameter than the implant fixture, a certain amount of the implant platform is exposed when an implant is platform switched, and this exposed area of the platform can allow for the tissues of the biologic width -- junctional epithelium and soft connective tissue—to begin forming here, requiring less bone to be resorbed to make room for attachment on the lateral surface of the implant fixture. Platform switching has been shown to have the potential to reduce the vertical bone resorption by as much as 70%.

=== Platform switching and the horizontal component of biologic width ===
Furthermore, by platform switching implants that are 3 mm apart or less or within 1.5 mm of the facial aspect of a thin buccal plate, the implant-abutment junction (IAJ) is shifted onto the implant platform away from the peri-implant bone, mitigating the deleterious impact of the inflammatory zone at the microgap of the implant-abutment junction on the bone, allowing for a reduction in the horizontal extent of bone loss.
