= Alpha Psi Omega =

American theatre fraternity (founded 1925)

- ΑΨΩ
- Founded: August 12, 1925; 101 years ago Fairmont State Normal School
- Type: Honor
- Affiliation: Independent
- Former affiliation: National Association of Speech Arts Honor Fraternities
- Status: Active
- Emphasis: Theatre
- Scope: International
- Motto: αιτειτε ψύχην ωφελιμον "Seek a life useful"
- Pillars: Artistic Excellence, Collaboration and Community, Leadership and Service, Education and Growth, Inclusivity and Accessibility, Legacy and Tradition
- Member badge
- Colors: Light Blue and Antique gold
- Flower: Violet
- Publication: Playbill
- Chapters: 551 active (997 total)
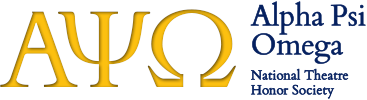
- Logo
- Headquarters: Sally Story, University of Arkansas – Fort Smith; 5210 Grand Ave; Fort Smith, Arkansas 72904; United States
- Website: www.alphapsiomega.org

Alpha Psi Omega National Theatre Honor Society (ΑΨΩ) is an international recognition fraternity for participants in collegiate theatre. It was established in 1925 at Fairmont State Normal School, now Fairmont State University. The society has established more than 1,000 chapters in the United States, Canada, and Egypt. In 1929, Alpha Psi Omega helped established its sister organizations: Delta Psi Omega, an honor society for junior colleges, and the International Thespian Society honor society for high schools.

== History ==
=== Alpha Psi Omega ===
Alpha Psi Omega National Honorary Dramatic Fraternity was founded by Paul F. Opp, professor of English, speech, and drama at Fairmont State Normal School, in 1925 in the Hardway Administration Building. Opp founded the fraternity after both Theta Alpha Phi and the National Collegiate Players/Pi Epsilon Delta denied charter petitions for Fairmont State College because teacher training schools did not qualify for membership.

Alpha Psi Omega chartered its first cast or chapter on August 12, 1925, formed from The Masquers drama club at Fairmont State University. Elinor B. Watson and Robert Sloan were the first student members. This was followed by the chartering of Beta cast at Marshall College. Eighteen additional casts were chartered in the next twelve months.

Alpha Psi Omega was based at Fairmont State. E. Turner Stump of Marshall College became the society's first president. Russell Spiers of Colgate University was the vice-president, and Opp was the secretary and editor of The Playbill. Opp was editor of The Playbill until 1966. Alpha Psi Omega held its first national convention in Chicago on December 27 and 28, 1926, with twenty casts present. The society continues to hold national conventions, or Grand Rehearsals, every five years.

In 1928, Alpha Psi Omega was invited and sent representatives to the annual convention of the Association of College Honor Societies. In 1938, the society was a member of the National Association of Speech Arts Honor Fraternities.

The society's national offices moved to Canada in 1929 and 1930 when Opp went to the University of Toronto to seek a doctorate. After graduating, Opp reestablished the national offices at Fairmont, where it remained until Opp reitirement in 1966.

In 1997, under pressure from anti-fraternity sentiments nationwide, the national officers decided to update the public titles of the organization. This changed the official name of the society from Alpha Psi Omega National Honorary Dramatic Fraternity to Alpha Psi Omega National Theatre Honor Society.

=== Delta Psi Omega ===
Opp established Delta Psi Omega, a similar organization for junior colleges, in 1929. Delta Psi Omega became the official junior-college division of Alpha Psi Omega in 1936. Both societies are governed by the same national officers, but have different coats of arms and induction ceremonies.

=== Thespian Society ===
Opp and Alpha Psi Omega were also instrumental in helping to organize the Thespian Society, now known as the International Thespian Society (I.T.S.), the theatre honor society for high school students. With an original grant of $500, the society was able to help organize I.T.S. and help publish the first issues of the I.T.S. magazine. The International Thespian Society has since been assimilated into the Educational Theatre Association, but the influences can be seen in the similarities of both organizations' colors and induction ceremonies.

== Symbols ==
The motto of Alpha Psi Omega, written in ancient Greek upon their coat-of-arms, is αιτειτε ψύχην ωφελιμον or "Seek a life useful". Its core values or pillars are Artistic Excellence, Collaboration and Community, Leadership and Service, Education and Growth, Inclusivity and Accessibility, and Legacy and Tradition.

The original colors of Alpha Psi Omega were moonlight blue and bastard amber, from the names of the shades of lighting gels commonly used in theatre lighting. It now uses light blue and antique gold. Its flower is the violet. The fraternity's badge is a monogram of the Greek letters "ΑΨΩ". The Alpha Psi Omega coat of arms is designed to represent a Greek theater's stage. Its annual publication is Playbill.

Alpha Psi Omega uses theatre-related terminology to refer to the honor society's officers and workings. For example, its chapters are referred to as "casts" and its inductees are called "understudies".

== Chapters ==
Alpha Psi Omega/Delta Psi Omega has installed 1,048 chapters in the United States, Canada, and Egypt. The society refers to its chapters as "casts". Chapters of Alpha Psi Omega are named with Greek Letter names according to the order in which they were chartered.

== Membership ==
Membership is open to students (primarily undergraduate) who are active in collegiate/university theatre at four-year institutions (full colleges and universities). Most casts/chapters use a "point system" for determining membership eligibility, with a certain number of points earned for tasks in the theatre. With some chapters, there is an induction/training process, while other chapters choose members solely on merit, where the theatre experience is considered the induction process. Honorary membership may be conferred on certain individuals (usually department faculty) after obtaining permission from the National Officers.

== Governance ==
The fraternity is overseen by an executive council called the Grand Cast. Its members include:

- President/National President – Director / Grand Director
- Vice-President/National Vice-President – Stage Manager / Grand Stage Manager
- Secretary-Treasurer/ National Secretary-Treasurer – Business Manager / Grand Business Manager

== Notable members ==
- Jay Alaimo (Roanoke College), co-wrote, directed and co-produced Slingshot
- Maxwell Anderson, playwright and actor known for Both Your Houses, High Tor, The Bad Seed
- Dan Blocker, actor known for Bonanza
- Jamie Campbell, American comedian, actor, improviser and playwright
- Jeff Coopwood, actor known for Star Trek: First Contact, Beverly Hills, 90210, The Wild Thornberrys, Seinfeld, The Bold and the Beautiful
- Cindy Elavsky columnist who writes the Celebrity Extra column
- Dann Florek, actor known for Law & Order, LA Law
- Lillian Gish, actress known for Follow Me Boys and a number of silent movies; Broadway revivals of Uncle Vanya
- Ron Glass, actor known for Firefly, Serenity
- Robert Hegyes, actor known for Welcome Back Kotter
- Don Knotts, actor and comedian known for The Incredible Mr. Limpet, The Ghost and Mr. Chicken, The Andy Griffith Show, Three's Company
- Pedro J. Labarthe, poet, journalist, essayist, and novelist.
- Sondra Locke, actress known for Willard, The Outlaw Josey Wales, Every Which Way but Loose, Sudden Impact
- Burt Mustin, actor known for Miracle on 34th Street, All in the Family, Petticoat Junction, Mame, Leave it to Beaver
- Olaf Odegaard, artist and playwright
- Eugene O'Neill, playwright known for Long Day's Journey into Night, The Iceman Cometh, A Moon for the Misbegotten
- Bill Pullman, actor known for Independence Day, Newsies, Spaceballs
- Stelio Savante, actor known for Ugly Betty, My Super Ex Girlfriend, What If..., Starship Troopers 3: Marauder, Corrado
- Jimmi Simpson, actor known for Rose Red
- Dulcé Sloan, comedian and actor known for The Daily Show, The Great North
- Robert Taylor, actor known for Ivanhoe
- Tennessee Williams, playwright known for The Glass Menagerie and A Streetcar Named Desire.
