= Paul Helliwell =

American lawyer, banker, and intelligence officier

Paul Lional Edward Helliwell (1915 – 24 December 1976) was an American lawyer, banker, OSS official, and CIA officer. While serving in this capacity he became director of Sea Supply, Inc. and president of Castle Bank & Trust. Helliwell was instrumental in setting up Civil Air Transport and Castle Bank & Trust, both of which were CIA proprietary companies. According to The Wall Street Journal, he was "deeply involved" in financing covert actions against Cuba from 1964 to 1975. Helliwell was reported to have played a key role in the purchase of the site for Disney World.

== Career ==
Helliwell joined the United States Army during World War II. Later he transferred to the Office of Strategic Services (OSS). In 1943, with the rank of Colonel, he became head of the Secret Intelligence Branch of the OSS in Europe. Future CIA director William Casey eventually replaced him in 1945.

From Europe, Helliwell moved on to head the Secret Intelligence branch in the OSS China command. While in China, Helliwell commanded, among others, future CIA officer E. Howard Hunt.

According to Seagraves, Edward Lansdale found a large cache in caves and tunnels in the Philippines after World War II ended. (Note: On 19 October 1945, Edward Lansdale began his fact finding mission after he arrived in Manila Bay aboard the United States Army Transport Ship (USAT) Uruguay.) Ray Cline believes that both Paul Helliwell and Robert Anderson created 176 "black gold" banking accounts in 42 countries after moving loot from The Philippines by ship to support future United States operations.

In 1947, Helliwell joined the CIA. In 1951, he formed a CIA front the Sea Supply Corporation which ran arms to Thailand police and Nationalist Chinese forces in Burma for ten years.

He formed Castle Bank & Trust in the Bahamas in January 1962 to provide a financial channel to support CIA operations against Cuba and Latin America including the Bay of Pigs Invasion in 1962 for which he was one of the pay masters.

Helliwell continued to work as a lawyer in Miami and served as legal counsel to a Panamanian holding company that controlled a Bahamian gambling casino connected with Meyer Lansky.

Beginning in 1965 by the IRS, "Operation Tradewinds" was an investigation into offshore tax havens primarily involving Castle Bank & Trust due to its association with suspected drug trafficking.

== Death ==
Helliwell suffered from emphysema in his later years. He died of a collapsed lung at his home in Coral Gables, Florida on 24 December 1976. He was survived by his wife, Marjorie, and a daughter, Anne.

Just after his death, two banks, Mercantile Bank Freeport and another Mercantile Bank in the Cayman Islands, which were both closely associated with Castle Bank & Trust, along with Castle Bank & Trust in both the Bahamas and Cayman Islands collapsed. The two Merchantile Banks were subsidiaries of George Olmsted's International Bank (IB) of Washington, D.C., which he had purchased in 1955. IB held a two thirds share of the banks beginning in December 1972. (Note: George Olmsted served in the United States Army during World War II and in 1944 was sent to the China-India-Burma theater as a colonel to form the G-5 civil affairs section (Economic and Political) of General Albert Wedemeyer's staff. G-5 was also responsible for clandestine activities, Lend-Lease, and the training of allied military forces.)

== Interviews ==
- "Ho Chi Minh Prime Minister of North Vietnam". Periscope Films, 1966.

== See also ==
- M-Fund (in Japanese)
