= Delta Psi Omega =

American theatre recognition fraternity

- ΔΨΩ
- Founded: March 20, 1929; 97 years ago Fairmont State College
- Type: Honor
- Affiliation: Alpha Psi Omega
- Status: Active
- Emphasis: Theatre
- Scope: National
- Colors: Light Blue and Antique gold
- Publication: Playbill
- Headquarters: United States
- Website: www.alphapsiomega.org

Delta Psi Omega National Theatre Honor Society (ΔΨΩ) is an American honor society for dramatics at two-year colleges. It was established in 1929 and became the official junior-college division of Alpha Psi Omega in 1936.

== History ==
Delta Psi Omega was created after several junior colleges applied for Alpha Psi Omega membership but could not be admitted due to the specifications of the theater fraternity's national bylaws. Paul F. Opp, professor of English, speech, and drama, found the society on March 20, 1929 in the Hardway Administration Building of Fairmont State Normal School. Opp was also the founder of Alpha Psi Omega. Delta Psi Omega was established as an honor society for dramatics at two-year colleges.

Delta Psi Omega was launched with 48 junior colleges as charter members. Some of its founding chapters were Averett College, Dickinson State Normal School, Fullerton, Junior College, Hibbing Junior College, Lewiston State Normal School, Mansfield Female College, Mars Hill College, Martha Washington College, Rochester Junior College, Shepherd College, Sullens College, Washington State Normal School, and Wesley College. Its first president or grand director was Irene Childrey Hock of Modesto Junior College. Opp served as the society's business manager and was also the editor of the ΔΨΩ Playbill. The society was based at Fairmont State.

In its first year, the society established 53 chapters. Delta Psi Omega's national offices moved to Canada from 1929 to 1930 when Opp went to the University of Toronto to seek a doctorate. After graduating, Opp reestablished the national offices at Fairmont State, where it remained until his retirement in 1965.

Delta Psi Omega was officially recognized as the junior college division of Alpha Psi Omega in 1936. In 1977, it had established 285 chapters.

== Symbols ==
The name Delta Psi Omega stands for "drama life song", derived from drama (Delta), the first letter of the Greek word for life (Psi), and the first letter of the Greek word for ode or song (Omega). The society uses theatre-related terminology, referrings to its chapters as "casts". Its publication is Playbill, a joint effort with Alpha Psi Omega.

Members may wear light blue and antique gold honor cords at graduation.

== Chapters ==
Delta Psi Omega chapters or casts are located at two-year institutions. Chapters use a number system for designation.

== Membership ==
To be eligible for membership, students must participate in a variety of college theatre activities for at least one semester and have a GPA of 2.5 or higher.

== Activities ==
Delta Psi Omega chapters sponsor and produce plays, help with various activities related to plays, host various social and charitable events, and attend plays.

== Governance ==
Delta Psi Omega and Alpha Psi Omega are governed by the same national officers, who are elected at a joint national meeting. The fraternity is overseen by its national office, consisting of its national officers. Its officers include a president, vice-president, business manager, web administrator, and five regional representatives. Chapters replicate the national offices, with a president, vice-president, and business manager.

== Notable members ==
- John C. England (Pasadena Junior College), officer in the United States Navy who died on USS Oklahoma in the attack on Pearl Harbor
- Mickey Zetts, singer, songwriter, and composer

== See also ==
- Alpha Psi Omega
- Honor societies
- International Thespian Society
- Professional fraternities and sororities
