= Jazz in June =

Jazz in June may refer to music festivals in:

- Lincoln, Nebraska
- Norman, Oklahoma
