= George H. Olmsted =

US Army general and financier (1901–1998)

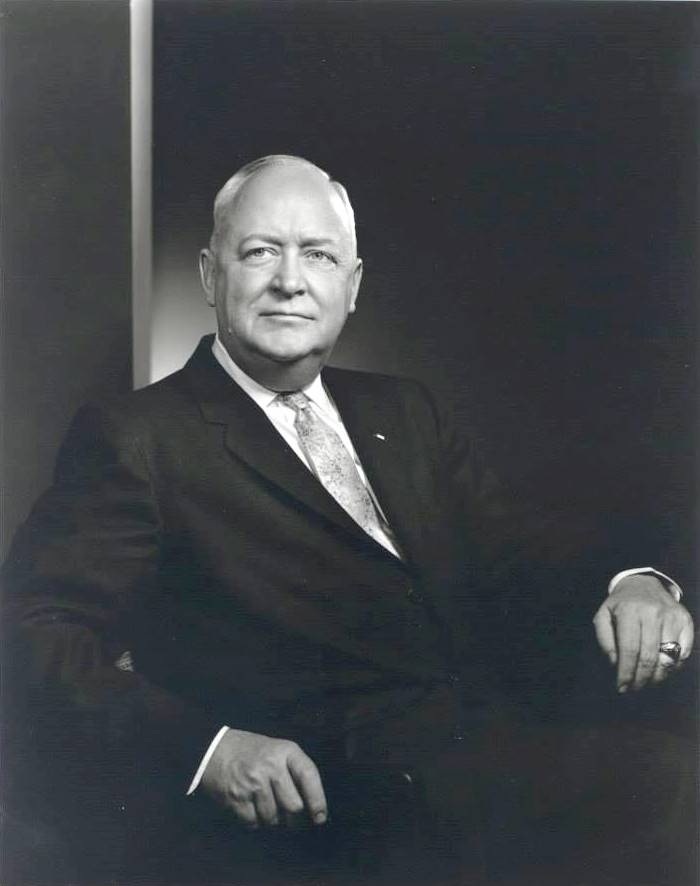
George H. Olmsted

Major General George Hamden Olmsted (March 18, 1901 – October 8, 1998) was an American military officer and insurance executive. Throughout Olmsted's career, he was a champion of the concepts of better education, jobs, and opportunities for all people. In the fields of banking and insurance, he brought availability and affordability of products and services to a market that was battered by the Great Depression. He carried on the dream of Arthur J. Morris, the founder of Financial General Corporation, that "anyone who has a steady job can qualify for installment credit from a bank".

== Early life ==
George H. Olmsted was born in Des Moines, Iowa, the second of four children of Ernest and Alice Lockwood Olmsted. He graduated from West High School in Des Moines and attended Iowa State University briefly during the fall of 1918, before receiving his appointment to the United States Military Academy at West Point on November 4, 1918.

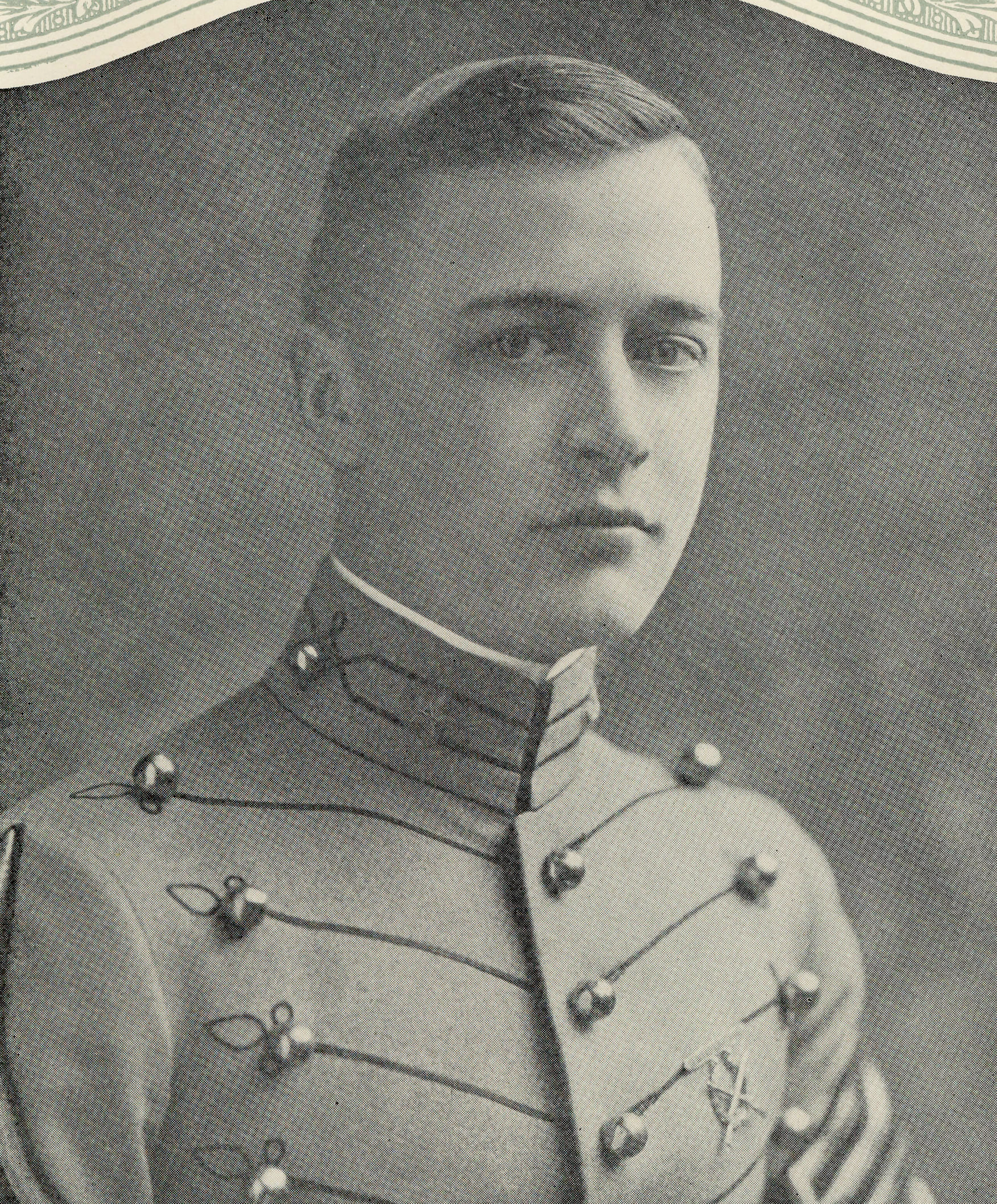
At West Point in 1922

During his four-year attendance at West Point, Olmsted was President of his class for three years. He graduated on June 22, 1922, holding the position of First Captain of the Corps of Cadets, ranking second in his class academically. He also served as Chairman of the Student Honor Committee and as Assistant Business Manager of the yearbook, Howitzer. In athletics, General Olmsted was the featherweight boxing champion of the academy and won his varsity "A" as manager and second-string quarterback of the 1922 Army football team.

== Civilian interlude ==
After graduation, Olmsted served in the active army until October 1923 when he returned to civilian life in Des Moines to enter business with his father who was running a small insurance agency.

By the beginning of 1924, they had expanded the agency into a general line fire and casualty agency named Olmsted & Olmsted. In September 1924, he married Virginia Camp, his high school sweetheart and left his father to start his own firm, Olmsted Inc. Agency. By 1928, his business had grown sufficiently to enable him to make his first purchase of another company, Travelers Mutual Casualty Company of Des Moines.

Attracting a great following among the younger businessmen of Des Moines, George Olmsted was elected President of the Junior Chamber of Commerce of Des Moines in 1927 and in 1929 was elected President of the National Junior Chamber of Commerce. A notable accomplishment during his tenure was the establishment of the "Outstanding Young Man of the Year" award. He attracted the attention of prominent persons at the national level of the Republican Party and was invited to meet with President Herbert Hoover at the White House. The President asked him to direct the activities of the Young Republican Division of the party in the upcoming general election of 1932 which he did. After the election, he continued to direct the Division until it evolved into the Young Republican National Committee which elected him its first President. He later served as the head of the Young Republican National Federation.

Despite struggling through the depression years, Travelers Mutual became one of the first companies to offer insurance and premium financing to the fledgling long haul trucking industry. Operations were expanded into Nebraska, Kansas, Missouri, and Illinois. In 1938, George Olmsted purchased the United Automobile Insurance Company of Grand Rapids, Michigan, and the Hawkeye Casualty Company of Cedar Rapids, Iowa. This was followed in 1940 by the purchase of the Illinois Casualty Company of Springfield, Illinois. Operating headquarters for all of these companies were consolidated in Des Moines, and a management team was established that would carry the companies through the hard years to come.

== World War II ==
Recalled to active service in the Army in January 1942, then Major Olmsted led the Requirements and Assignments Branch, International Division, Army Service Forces which handled Lend Lease requests from allied governments for Army material and equipment. In this position he had to balance the complex, simultaneous equations of American industrial production schedules and capacity, American military requirements, urgent requests for help from allied governments and the demands of the current strategic situation. Frantic appeals were coming to the United States from Great Britain, the Soviet Union, China, and Free French Forces in North Africa. All of these appeals had to be dealt with as rapidly or as diplomatically as possible. In addition, Olmsted established programs to ensure delivery of assistance to the correct place at the promised time as well as programs to train the recipients in the use and maintenance of the equipment.

In 1944, then Colonel Olmsted's wife Virginia died. Shortly thereafter he was sent to China to serve on the staff of General Albert Wedemeyer and to establish a new general staff section known as G-5 for the China-Burma-India Theater. Olmsted was promoted to brigadier general and took charge of the G-5 section which was responsible for civil (Economic and Political) affairs, lend lease operations, training of allied military forces, and clandestine operations.

As World War II came to a close in the Pacific, a new situation faced the allies in China. Thousands of allied prisoners of war (including General Jonathan Wainwright, the hero of Bataan) were being held in eleven Japanese POW camps in China. Working with the Office of Strategic Services (OSS), US Navy Intelligence, and allied intelligence services, the locations of all eleven camps were pinpointed and General Olmsted was ordered to plan and direct an operation to notify the Japanese as soon as a surrender had been announced and to ensure that they cooperated in the safe repatriation of the prisoners. His plan called for leaflets to be dropped by aircraft on each camp immediately after the surrender. Shortly after that, a team of seven unarmed men were to parachute into each camp carrying with them letters signed by General Wedemeyer addressed to the Japanese camp commander by name. The letters stated that the war was over, that the allied powers would hold the camp commander personally responsible for the safety of the prisoners and that he should fully cooperate in an immediate repatriation. No one was quite sure how the Japanese would react to this. However, the operation was carried out as planned, there were no hostilities, no one was injured, and the Japanese agreed to cooperate fully.

The last great problem to face Olmsted in China was what to do with the surplus equipment that had to be left behind in the Theater as American forces departed to come home. Not wishing to see all that materiel abandoned in place, Olmsted managed to work out a bulk sale to the Chinese government. When he heard about it, President Truman was reported to have said, "this was the best liquidation of surplus US equipment anywhere in the world."

For his services during the war, Olmsted received the Distinguished Service Medal, the Legion of Merit, and the Bronze Star Medal. From the French government he received the Legion of Honor, the British Government made him an Honorary Commander of the Order of the British Empire, and the government of China honored him with the Order of the Sacred Tripod and the Special Order of Pao Ting.

== Post war ==
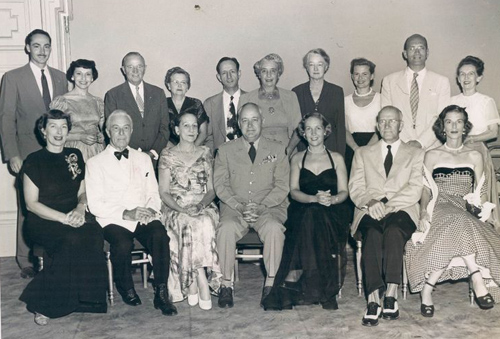
General Olmsted with members from the United World Federalists Florida Branch at the national organization's 1952 annual meeting

Olmsted returned to Des Moines in 1946. The management team that he had built in his companies before leaving for military service had performed well during the war years and his return became a matter of picking up where he had left off. After an unsuccessful bid for the Republican nomination for governor of Iowa in 1947, he continued to expand his business activities and became a partner in the Equity Corporation in New York. He became a leader in the United World Federalists in 1947, later serving as a national vice-president of the organization. In 1948 he met Carol Shearing of Marilla, New York, and they were married in 1949. Recalled to active duty with the Army in 1950, General Olmsted assumed command of the Army's military assistance operations. Once again, it was a case of finding the equipment and resources that Allied Governments requested and getting it to them. So successful were his activities that he was promoted to major general in 1951 and assigned to the Office of the Secretary of Defense to assume command of all US government military assistance be it Army, Navy, or Air Force. Released from active service in 1953, Olmsted returned again to Des Moines to resume his business career. He continued, however, to serve in the Army Reserve and was the Commanding General of the 103rd Infantry Division USAR from 1953 to 1959.

=== Business interests ===
Shortly after his separation from active duty in 1953, Olmsted bought control of United Services Life Insurance Company, which wrote life insurance for officers of the military services. In 1955, he purchased control of International Bank of Washington. In 1959, he purchased Financial General Bankshares, the 7th largest bank holding company in the country, from his partners at the Equity Corporation. The final form for Olmsted's business ventures had come into being. All of the companies were grouped under International Bank or Financial General, both of which were headquartered in Washington, D.C.

International Bank (IB) was headquartered in a building at 1701 Pennsylvania Avenue (diagonally across from the Old Executive Office Building and the White House) in Washington and controlled the activities of several companies which were separated into five operating groups:

1. The Life Insurance Group – United Services Life Insurance Company/Bankers Security Life Insurance Society.
2. The Property and Casualty Insurance Group – Hawkeye-Security Insurance Company and the other insurance companies in Des Moines.
3. The International Maritime Group – The International Trust Company of Liberia which administered the registration of vessels under the Liberian flag.
4. The International Banking Group – Ownership interests with local partners in commercial banks in 10 foreign countries.
5. The Industrial Group – Globe Industries, Kliklok Corporation, Avis Industrial Corporation, and a 16% ownership of Foster Wheeler Corporation.

In December 1972, International Bank (IB) bought a two thirds stake in the Mercantile Bank & Trust Company which had a bank in Freeport, Bahamas, the Mercantile Bank of Freeport, and another bank in the Cayman Islands of a similar name. These banks had been established by I. Gordon Mosvold of the Mosvold Shipping Group. In September 1976, when Mosvold resigned from Mercantile's board, he had $4.55 million in loans with Mercantile. Henry N. Conway, Jr., senior vice president of IB, stated that several loans on greatly overvalued property in Bimini and Freeport had been made by Mercantile but no terms had been established. According to an audit by Price Waterhouse, Mercantile had transferred about $2 million in assets and liabilities just prior to IB's takeover of its $26 million to Castle Bank & Trust of Nassau, Bahamas which Paul Helliwell founded through a Panamanian shell company through his Miami-based law firm in 1962. (Note: Paul Helliwell had been the chief of special intelligence in China for the OSS during World War II.) Castle Bank fell under investigation during "Operation Tradewinds" which was begun by the IRS in 1965 due to suspected drug trafficking involving Castle Bank. However, following the death of Helliwell on December 24, 1976, the banks Castle, Mercantile (Nassau) and Mercantile (Cayman) collapsed in the middle of May 1977. Castle had been under the IRS's "Project Haven" investigation due to over three hundred Castle clients supposedly involved in a tax evasion scheme. In 1980, Helliwell's Castle Bank was revealed to be a CIA account for the Helliwell law firm. In addition to Helliwell supposedly being one of the pay masters for the Bay of Pigs invasion of Cuba in 1961, Castle had been one of the CIA's financing channels for operations in Latin America and against Cuba between 1964 and 1975 which included CIA operatives located on Andros Island, Bahamas.

Financial General was a domestic bank holding company which held controlling interests in 26 banks located in seven states and the District of Columbia. It was one of the few banks in the country that had been grandfathered to do business across state lines after the McFadden Act largely banned interstate banking. In 1966, following years of criticism from other banks, the Federal Reserve ruled that Financial General was a bank holding company, and as such could not be owned by International Bank (which despite its name was largely an insurance company). Olmsted was ordered to sell off Financial General by 1978. It eventually went to a group of Arab investors who were actually nominees for the Bank of Credit and Commerce International. This group changed FGB's name to First American Bankshares, which would remain a secret subsidiary of BCCI until the latter's shutdown in 1991.

=== Community support ===
Throughout his career, Olmsted worked with colleges and universities and sought to enhance the availability and quality of higher education for all people. He served on the board of trustees at Drake University in Des Moines, the American University in Washington, the West Point Association of Graduates, the West Point Alumni Foundation, and from 1973 to 1978, at the appointment of President Nixon, on the Board of Visitors at West Point. He received honorary degrees from several universities: Doctor of Laws – Drake University. Doctor of International Relations – Southeastern University. Doctor of Business Administration – Iowa Wesleyan College. Doctor of Commercial Science – Coe College.

Camp Olmsted at Goshen Scout Reservation is named after George H. Olmsted.

== George and Carol Olmsted Foundation ==
In 1959, Olmsted and his wife Carol established the George Olmsted Foundation. The foundation later changed its name to the George and Carol Olmsted foundation. The principal activity of the Foundation is The Olmsted Scholar Program. Working with the support and cooperation of the Department of Defense, the Department of Homeland Security, and the Departments of the various Services, the program offers outstanding young military leaders an unsurpassed opportunity to achieve fluency in a foreign language, pursue graduate study at an overseas university, and acquire an in-depth understanding of foreign cultures, thereby further equipping them to serve in positions of great responsibility as senior leaders in the United States Armed Forces.

Each year, approximately 16 young officers are selected as Olmsted Scholars from among the six Armed Services. They complete up to a year of language training, then enroll as full-time students at foreign universities of their choice as approved by the Foundation’s Board of Directors and their Services. Scholars pursue graduate studies in one or more areas of the liberal arts. Studies are normally conducted in the language of the country in question, except in rare cases where the language of instruction may be English. Scholars also travel extensively throughout their countries of study and the surrounding regions to learn what they can about the culture, history and attitudes of those who live there. They receive substantial financial grants to support such travel. In this way, the Olmsted Scholar Program strengthens American leadership around the world and advances the interests of the United States in military and foreign affairs.

Since 1959, 800 officers have been selected as Olmsted Scholars. They have studied at more than 200 different universities located in over 60 different countries and in over 40 languages. To date, a total of 52 Olmsted Scholars have been selected for promotion to general or flag officer rank, including eight 4-star general or admirals. Among these are a former Chief of Naval Operations (CNO), Admiral Carlisle Trost; the last Commander-in-Chief of Strategic Air Command (SAC), General George Lee Butler; former Commanders of United States Central Command (CENTCOM), General John Abizaid, and United States Southern Command (SOUTHCOM), Admiral Kurt Tidd; and the current Commander of United States Africa Command (AFRICOM) General Dagvin Anderson.

== Personal life ==
Olmsted died at his home in North Arlington, Virginia, on October 8, 1998, after a long period of incapacitation due to a stroke in the mid-1980s. He and his second wife Carol Shearing (1909–1993) are buried at Arlington National Cemetery in Virginia.

His grandfather Jerauld Aubrey Olmsted and son George Hamden Olmsted Jr. were also West Point graduates. His older brother Jerauld Lockwood Olmsted attended the Naval Academy but died from polio only a year after graduation.

== See also ==
- List of Chairpersons of the College Republicans
