= Mickey Zetts =

American singer

Mickey Zetts (born September 25, 1971) is a singer, songwriter, and composer living in New York.

Formerly of South Florida, Mickey Zetts started out acting and writing plays/music for the theatre. He attended the performing arts magnet at Dillard High School in Ft. Lauderdale and was a member of the theatrical fraternity Delta Psi Omega. His musical play APATHY-the Gen X Musical was the longest running late night show in the history of Florida Playwrights' Theatre in Hollywood, Florida.

In late 1997, Mickey took a long break from the theatre & formed the alternative band, Mickey's Ickies (Originally Them Ickies). Known locally as a wacky-theatrically fun variety show, the band Mickey's Ickies had a high-profile career locally, with even some national recognition among MP3.com listeners (Mickey's Modern Irish Drinking Song was voted into the top 40) and winning the Baywatch Battle of the Bands competition in 1999. That year also saw the completion of the band's full-length CD, Life is a Dream.

In 2003, Mickey relocated to New York City. Mickey and a new band, simply called "the Ickies" released a new album, Out Of The Box, in March 2015. In 2020, after a five year break from writing new music, Mickey released the EP Dracula Daughter as well as a host of new singles. 2021 saw the release of a new full-length album titled The Art On The Moon, though widely ignored by critics, he considers it to be the best work he's done since Apathy.

As of 2025, Mickey currently sings and plays bass in an Acoustic Dance band called The Wood Vibrations. He also sings lead and plays guitar in the original Alt Rock band Dracula Daughter.

== Recent credits ==
- "Toast, Boast or Roast: A Tribute to Austin Pendleton"- Oberon Theatre Ensemble '14, The Players (New York City). Wrote and performed an original song for acting legend, Austin Pendleton. Also attending the benefit that evening were: Norbert Leo Butz, Olympia Dukakis and F. Murray Abraham.
- GREEN! by Ken Scudder—produced by the Mistake, ’10, Performed at the Planet Connections Festivity, NYC. Original music, lyrics and sound effects design.
- Insecurity!--Oberon Theatre Ensemble ’09, Performed at the Midtown International Theatre Festival. Original book, music and lyrics.
- Twelfth Night--Holla Holla Productions ’07, performed at the Hudson River Park, NYC. Original music.
- The Merry Wives of Windsor--Oberon Theatre Ensemble ’07, performed at the Lion at Theatre Row, NYC. Original music, lyrics and sound effects design.
- A Midsummer Night's Dream--Holla Holla Productions ’06, performed in the Sheep's Meadow, Central Park, NYC. Original music.
- Babies with Rabies--Cuchipinoy Productions ’06, performed at the Looking Glass Theatre, NYC. Original music and sound effects design.
- Prince Trevor Amongst the Elephants by Duncan Pflaster--Cross-Eyed Bear Productions ’05, performed at the Spotlight On Halloween Festival. Sound effects design.
- Apathy--The Gen X Musical in CONCERT--Mickey Zetts Productions '05, performed at the Spotlight On Halloween Festival, NYC. Original book, music and lyrics.
- Apathy--The Gen X Musical--Mickey Zetts Productions '05. Performed at the Midtown International Theatre Festival. Original book, music and lyrics.
- Love Suffocates by Mary Beth Shannahan. Performed at the Spotlight On Halloween Festival ’04, NYC. Original music and lyrics.

== Awards and honors ==
- Apathy--The Gen X Musical received a citation from TalkinBroadway.com for "Outstanding New Musical" in the summer of ‘05.
- The song "Mister Bitter's Blues" from Apathy--The Gen X Musical was awarded a 2006 "Spotlight On Award" by Spotlight On Productions for Best Original Song from a New Musical Work.
- Insecurity! was awarded a 2009 MITF Award by The Midtown International Theatre Festival for Outstanding Music and Lyrics in a Main Stage full length musical production.
- GREEN! was awarded a 2010 PCF Award by the Planet Connections Festivity for Outstanding Musical Performance by a Musician, Band, or Orchestra (Mickey Zetts and Ryan Cox). The production also won the PCF awards for Best Supporting Actor and Best Supporting Actress.

== Professional affiliations ==
- Currently a member of the Oberon Theatre Ensemble in New York City.
- Florida Playwrights' Theatre, Hollywood, Florida—composed original music for Macbeth, Twelfth Night, and The Legend of Sleepy Hollow for the company '95-'98.
- Alabama Shakespeare Festival, Montgomery, Alabama—sound board operator ‘94-‘95.
