= Proud of Me =

Proud of Me may refer to:

- Proud of Me (film), a Chinese film of 2018
- "Proud of Me", a song by Tracy Byrd from his 1999 album It's About Time
- "Proud of Me", a song by Angie Stone from her 2012 album Rich Girl
- "Proud of Me", a song by Lil Keed from his 2018 album Long Live Mexico
- "Proud of Me", a 2018 song by Mahalia
- "Proud of Me", a song by Asian Doll from her 2019 album Unfuccwitable
- "Proud of Me", a song by Nav from his 2020 album Good Intentions

== See also ==
- Tell Me You're Proud of Me
- Proud of Myself
