= Kirby Wright =

American writer

Kirby Michael Wright is an American writer best known for his 2005 coming-of-age island novel Punahou Blues and the epic novel Moloka'i Nui Ahina, which is based on the life and times of Wright's paniolo grandmother. Both novels deal with the racial tensions between haoles (whites) and the indigenous Hawaiians, and illustrate the challenge for characters who, as the product of mixed-race marriages, must try to bridge the two cultures and overcome prejudice from both camps. Wright has ventured into the genre of creative nonfiction in 2019 with The Queen of Moloka'i, which explores the teenage years of his part-Hawaiian grandmother and documents the Wright family saga in the islands.

Wright's work is primarily concerned with the complexities of multicultural Hawaii, Killahaole Day, prejudices against (and within) island high schools, and the tricky matter of interracial dating. He incorporates the local creole language into his novels and was the first author to document the pidgin English spoken by the paniolo cowboys on the east end of Molokai.

Wright has ventured into the arena of speculative fiction with a pair of books in 2013. The End, My Friend is a futuristic thriller set in the not-too-distant future featuring a survivalist couple roaming an apocalyptic landscape from San Diego north to Crater Lake, Oregon. Square Dancing at the Asylum is set, in part, at the former state asylum in Worcester, Mass., and is dedicated to Paul Ford Nolan, Wright's great-uncle and lifelong resident of the asylum. Both books received Certificates of Excellence at the 2014 San Diego Book Awards. HOUDINI, his first play, was performed at the Secret Theatre in New York on February 20, 2016. The Secret Theatre produced his second play, Asylum Uncle, on November 4, 2016.

== Biography ==
=== Early years ===
Wright was born in Honolulu, Hawaii. He is of English-Irish-Italian-Hawaiian heritage. His European roots are in Cork, Ireland, Nelson, England, and Genoa, Italy. His father, Harold S. Wright, was a corporate attorney for the firm Smith Wild BeeBe & Cades. His mother, the former June McCormack of Boston, was a secretary at the Massachusetts Institute of Technology MIT. Starting at the age of four, Wright spent summers with his part-Hawaiian grandmother Julia Gilman on her ranch on the east end of Molokai. It was here that Wright met Sophie Cooke, a cattle rancher who wrote the memoir Sincerely, Sophie about her life and times on the islands. This meeting proved influential to the young Wright because Cooke wrote about his grandmother. Evidence of Wright's love for the written word surfaced at the Star of the Sea Elementary School in Honolulu, where he crafted and performed plays about vampires, pro wrestlers, and secret agents. Kirby Wright won first place in a recital competition for his reading of "Trees" by Joyce Kilmer and also won awards for his original poems.

Kirby was transferred to the Punahou School in the 7th Grade and won the short story competition. Despite winning this competition, he felt like an outsider at Punahou School and his experiences at this private institution became fertile material for his coming-of-age novel Punahou Blues.

=== University years ===
Wright attended the University of Colorado at Boulder for one semester and then transferred to the University of Hawaiʻi at Mānoa. At the University of Hawaiʻi, he studied under the tutelage of Maxine Hong Kingston and met Kurt Vonnegut as well as Allen Ginsberg. Wright transferred to the University of California, San Diego, where he took classes taught by the poets Bobbie Louise Hawkins and Jerome Rothenberg. Wright received a B.A. degree in English and American literature of the University of California San Diego.

After graduation, wright sold cars for a living at Rancho Olds in Kearny Mesa, then became public relations director for the Carlsbad Inn and San Clemente Cove. Rich but unhappy, he applied to the San Francisco State University and was accepted into their Masters Program in Creative Writing by Anne Rice. While at the San Francisco State University, he took classes taught by Frances Mayes, Daniel J. Langton, Molly Giles, and Harry Mark Petrakis. Kirby Wright earned a Master of Fine Arts in creative writing and was the first student in the history of his university to receive the (Academy of American Poets Award as well as the Browning Society Award for Dramatic Monologue, and the Ann Fields Poetry Prize).

== Punahou Blues ==
The setting of the book (ISBN 0-9741067-1-2) is Wright's high-school alma mater Punahou School. The novel provides insight into the tumultuous 1960s and '70s in multicultural Honolulu, from the viewpoint of a white (haole) boy narrator searching for his identity in this private school. His rites of passage include losing the girl of his dreams, not living up to his father's great expectations, surviving Killahaole Day, being suspended, sibling rivalry, fighting the school bully, and navigating the tricky waters of interracial dating.

A parallel novel entitled Molokai'i Nui Ahina was published in August 2007. The book (ISBN 978-0-9741067-2-4) features the life and times of Julia Daniels, a Moloka'i pioneer woman of mixed blood, who invites her grandsons Jeff and Ben to spend the summer with her at her ranch. She shares the land with ex-husband Chipper, an alcoholic war hero with an estate bordering the swamp. The boys roam a true paradise consisting of fishponds, waterfalls, and mountains with herds of deer. Jeff meets the kahuna woman who freezes pictures of her enemies, the transsexual who seduces the Chief of Police, the man who referees cock fights in Kaunakakai, the beautiful divorcee who lives in the saddle room, and the prodigal grandfather who returns to woo Julia. All these characters shape Jeff's sensibilities as he learns the secrets of his grandmother's wild past in Honolulu and the intensity of her struggles on the Lonely Isle.

== Awards and recognition ==
Kirby Wright has been nominated for five Pushcart Prizes and three Best of the Net Awards. He is a past recipient of the Jodi Stutz Memorial Prize in Poetry, the Ann Fields Poetry Prize, the Academy of American Poets Award, the Ad Hoc Flash Fiction Award, two Browning Society Awards for Dramatic Monologue, seven San Diego Book Awards, and Arts Council Silicon Valley Fellowships in Poetry and The Novel. Before the City (ISBN 0-9741067-0-4), his first book of poetry, took First Place at the San Diego Book Awards. Punahou Blues was a Finalist at the San Diego Book Awards and Honorable Mention at the Hawaii Book Awards. He was recently interviewed on Fox Morning News, Art Rocks internet radio in San Diego, and Hawaiian Kine News out of Las Vegas. He is a frequent guest on 50th State Radio, hosted by Uncle Paul Natto and broadcast live over the Internet from Las Vegas. Wright is a subject of biographical entry in ten editions of Who's Who in America and was listed in the 2001 and 2007 editions of Who's Who in the World.

He won a Visiting Writer post at the 2009 International Writers Conference in Hong Kong, where he joined fellow US poet Gary Snyder as well as Pacific Rim colleagues Young-Ha Kim (Korea), Bi Feiyu (China), Atsushi Shiitada (Okinawa), Wena Poon (Singapore), Chen Li (Taiwan), Miguel Syjuco (Philippines) and Janet Charman (New Zealand). He represented the Pacific Rim region of Hawaii at this writers conference. Wright also won a Visiting Writer post at the 2010 Martha's Vineyard Writers Residency in Edgartown, Mass., and was the 2011 Artist in Residence at Milkwood International, Czech Republic. He won both the 2012 Honolulu Weekly Nonfiction Prize and the 2012 Honolulu Weekly Poetry Prize. Wright was the 2014 Resident Scholar at the Earthskin Artist Colony in Auckland, New Zealand. He was awarded Certificates of Excellence in three different Published Book categories at the 2014 San Diego Book Awards. Wright received a 2015 Certificate of Recognition from the 76th District of the California Legislature Assembly for his body of work and his exceptional dedication to writing.

He was the 2016 Artist in Residence at the Eckerö Mail and Customs House in the Åland Islands, Finland, and won the 2018 Redwood Empire Mensa Award for creative nonfiction. In April, 2019, he was recognized by Judy Ritter, the Mayor of Vista, California, for his contributions to local arts as well as his inclusion in over 200 literary journals around the world.

Kirby Wright is represented by Geraldine Nichol of The Book Bureau Literary Agency in Wicklow, Ireland.

== Selected works ==
- Champagne Eyes: Poetry and Prose. San Diego, California: Heebie-Jeebie Press, 1986.
- Life Extension. [n.p.]: Green Turtle Press Chapbooks, 2002.
- Before the City: Collected Poems & Prose Poems. San Diego, California: Lemon Shark Press, 2003.
- Punahou Blues. San Diego, California: Lemon Shark Press, 2005.
- Moloka'i Nui Ahina: Summers on the Lonely Isle. San Diego, California: Lemon Shark Press, 2007.
- The End, My Friend. San Diego, California: Lemon Shark Press, 2013.
- Permanent Damage. Patterson, New York: The Last Automat Press, 2013.
- Square Dancing at the Asylum: Nouveau Noir Flash Fiction. San Diego, California: Lemon Shark Press, 2013.
- The Widow from Lake Bled. Westbrook, Maine: Moon Pie Press, 2013.
- Outside the Hotel. St. Louis, Missouri: Architrave Press, 2013.
- Notes Above Water: Selected Poems. San Diego, California: Lemon Shark Press, 2014.
- Hong Kong Man: Selected Poems. San Diego, California: Lemon Shark Press, 2015.
- The Girl With the Green Violin. La Mesa, California: Etched Press, 2015.
- Houdini. A play performed at The Secret Theatre, New York, New York, 2016.
- Asylum Uncle. A play performed at The Secret Theatre, New York, New York, 2016.
- At the Customs House: Poetry and Flash. San Diego, California: Lemon Shark Press, 2017.
- The Wounded Morning: Poetry and Flash. San Diego, California: Lemon Shark Press, 2017.
- Rag Of Man. A play performed at Manhattan Repertory Theatre, New York, New York, 2017.
- The Queen of Moloka'i, Book 1: Based on a True Story. San Diego, California: Lemon Shark Press, 2019.
- As Big As a Dallas Cowboy. A play performed at ARTS at Marks Garage, Honolulu, Hawaii, 2019.
- Sorrow Town: Selected Stories. San Diego, California: Lemon Shark Press, 2021.
- American Dreamland: Poetry. Morongo Valley, California: Bottlecap Press, 2024.
