= Lords of the Rim =

Book by Sterling Seagrave

- First edition
- Author: Sterling Seagrave
- Language: English
- Subject: History, economics, business
- Genre: Nonfiction
- Publisher: Putnam
- Publication date: 2010 (2nd ed), 1995 (1st ed)
- Publication place: United States
- Media type: Hardback & paperback
- Pages: 354
- ISBN: 978-0-399-14011-2
- Preceded by: Dragon Lady: The Life and Legend of the Last Empress of China
- Followed by: The Yamato Dynasty: The Secret History of Japan's Imperial Family

Lords of the Rim is a book written by American historian Sterling Seagrave. It was first published in 1995, then substantially updated in a second edition published in 2010. It is a history of Chinese expatriate economics written for the lay person and has received mixed reviews. Presenting an in-depth overview of the outstanding success of expatriate Chinese business people around the Pacific Rim, the author begins with a potted history of China's finance and business practices over the last three thousand years and the political reasons for the first tide of entrepreneurs to chance their luck overseas.

== Outline ==
Over the last two to three thousand years, Chinese expatriates have gained a firm trade and business foothold in almost every country around the Pacific Rim area, from Vietnam and Indochina to the West Coast of the United States and Canada.

Seagrave attempts to disclose the way these Chinese merchants do business, with each other and with others. He claims that many of these entrepreneurs, despite how many years or centuries they may have been settled in a particular country hold no real allegiance to any government or people except their ancestral clans and ‘home’ villages in China. The author also reveals some of the dubious and aggressive business practices these Lords of the Rim have adopted and mastered over the years. These tactics and their traditional work ethos go some way to explain their astonishing success in the past and up to the present day.
