= Yamashita's gold =

Purported treasure hidden in the Philippines

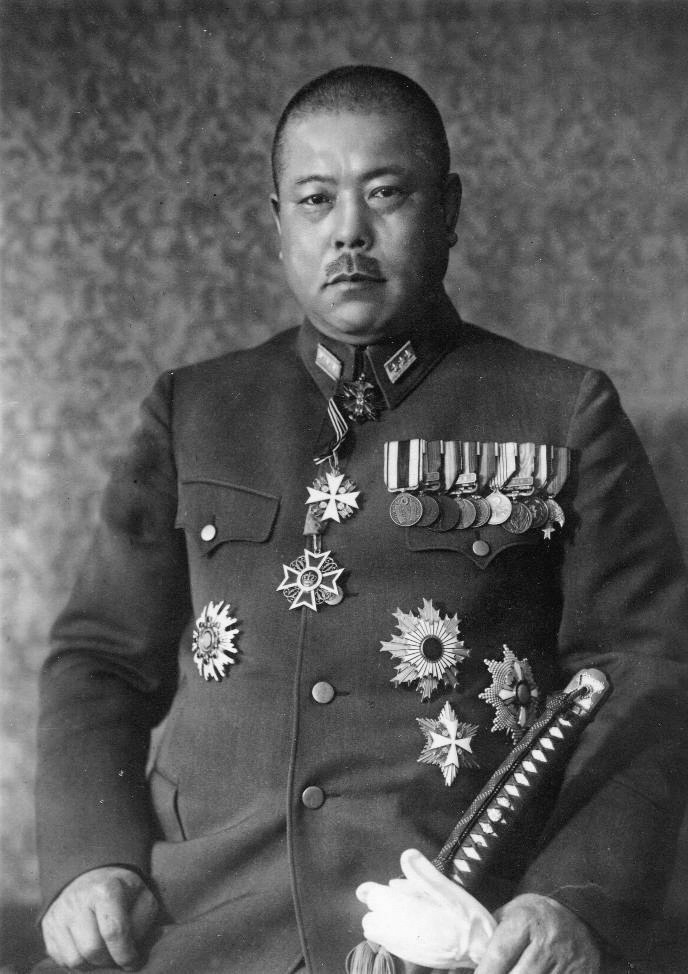
General Tomoyuki Yamashita

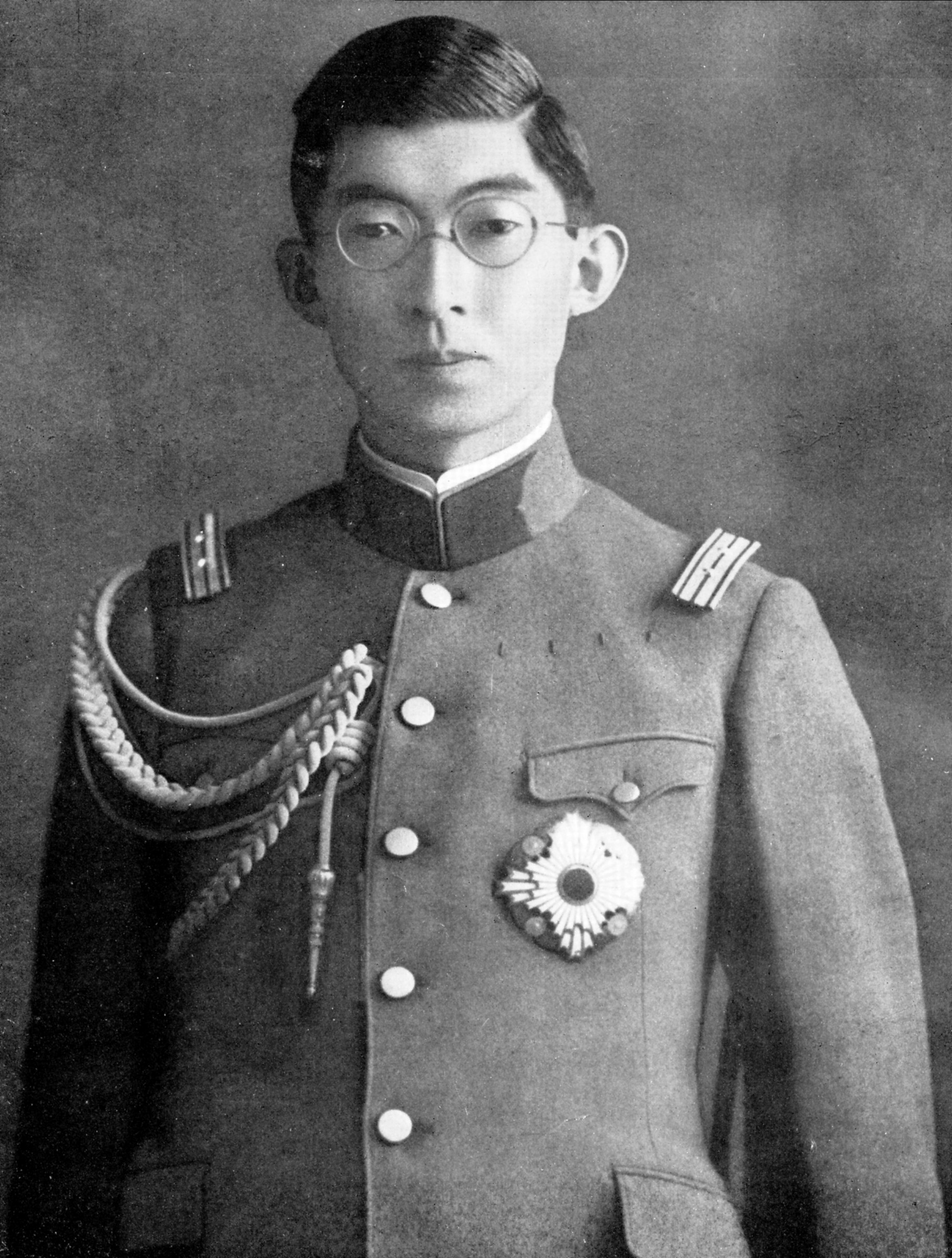
Prince Yasuhito Chichibu

Yamashita's gold, also referred to as the Yamashita treasure, is the name given to the alleged war loot stolen from across Southeast Asia by Imperial Japanese forces during World War II and supposedly hidden in caves, tunnels, or underground complexes in different cities in the Philippines. It was named after the last Japanese military governor of the Philippines, general Tomoyuki Yamashita, dubbed as "The Tiger of Malaya", who conquered Malaya and Singapore within 70 days from the British. Though there are accounts that claim the treasure remains hidden in the Philippines and have lured treasure hunters from around the world for over 50 years, its existence has been dismissed by most experts. The rumored treasure was the subject of a complex lawsuit that was filed in a Hawaiian state court in 1988 involving a Filipino treasure hunter, Rogelio Roxas, and the former Philippine president, Ferdinand Marcos.

== Looting of gold ==
Prominent among those who have argued for the existence of Yamashita's gold are Sterling Seagrave and his wife Peggy, who wrote two books related to the subject: The Yamato Dynasty: The Secret History of Japan's Imperial Family (2000) and Gold Warriors: America's Secret Recovery of Yamashita's Gold (2003). The Seagraves contend that looting, including more than 6000 tonnes of gold, was organized on a massive scale, by both yakuza gangsters, such as Yoshio Kodama, and the highest levels of Japanese society, including Emperor Hirohito. The Japanese government intended that loot from Southeast Asia would finance Japan's war effort. The Seagraves allege that Hirohito appointed his brother, Prince Yasuhito Chichibu, to head a secret organization named Kin no yuri (金の百合; "Golden Lily"), after a poem that the Emperor had written. It is purported that many of those who knew the locations of the loot were killed during the war, or later tried by the Allies for war crimes and executed or incarcerated. Yamashita himself was convicted of war crimes and executed by the United States Army on February 23, 1946, in Los Baños, Laguna, the Philippines.

According to the Seagraves, numerous Golden Lily vaults were found by Edward Lansdale and Severino Garcia Diaz Santa Romana (Note: Severino Garcia Diaz Santa Romana (b. 1901 or 1907, Luzon) was a Filipino-American commando who fought in the Philippines during World War II and had witness Japanese placing very heavy boxes in tunnels and caves. Also, United States Navy Warrant Officer John Ballinger disguised as a fisherman had witness Japanese offloading very heavy boxes full of gold from a hospital ship in early 1945.) in caves north of Manila in the high valleys and the 'M-Fund', which was named after Major General William Marquat, was established from Santa Romana and Lansdale's work. (Note: On October 19, 1945, Edward Lansdale began his fact finding mission after he arrived in Manila Bay aboard the United States Army Transport Ship (USAT) USS Uruguay. The ship was originally operated by the Panama Pacific Line as the passenger liner CALIFORNIA sailing between San Francisco and New York via Los Angeles, San Diego, the Panama Canal and Havana from 1928-1937, operated by the US Maritime Commission as the URUGUAY from 1937-1942 after which it became the USAT USS Uruguay from 1942-1946 and operated by Moore-McCormack Lines as the passenger liner URUGUAY sailing between New York and South America from 1948-1954 after which it was mothballed and subsequently sold as scrap in 1964 to the firm North American Smelting Company of Wilmington, Delaware.) Sterling Seagrave alleged that Santa Romana (Santy) tortured Yamashita's driver Major Kojima Kashii to obtain the probable locations of the loot. The Seagraves wrote that Lansdale flew to Tokyo and briefed MacArthur and his Chief of Intelligence Charles Willoughby, later flew to the United States to brief Clark Clifford and returned with Robert Anderson to inspect several caves in the Philippines with Douglas MacArthur. More than 170 tunnels and caves were found. Ray Cline believes that both Robert Anderson and Paul Helliwell created 176 "black gold" banking accounts in 42 countries after moving the loot by ship to support future United States operations. (Note: With a total worth of over $50 trillion in 2009, one Black Eagle Trust numbered account depostited at the HSBC was a certificate of time deposit worth $93 billion on September 15, 2004.)

The stolen property reportedly included many different kinds of valuables looted from banks, depositories, other commercial premises, museums, private homes, and religious buildings. It takes its name from General Tomoyuki Yamashita, who assumed command of the Japanese forces in the Philippines in 1944.

According to various accounts, the loot was initially concentrated in Singapore, and later transported to the Philippines. The Japanese hoped to ship the treasure from the Philippines to the Japanese Home Islands after the war ended. As the War in the Pacific progressed, United States Navy submarines and Allied warplanes inflicted increasingly heavy sinkings of Japanese merchant shipping. Some of the ships carrying the war booty back to Japan were sunk in combat.

The Seagraves and a few others have claimed that American military intelligence operatives located much of the loot; they colluded with Hirohito and other senior Japanese figures to conceal its existence, and they used it as "Black Gold" to finance American covert intelligence operations around the world during the Cold War. These rumors have inspired many hopeful treasure hunters, but most experts and Filipino historians say there is no credible evidence behind these claims.

In 1992, Imelda Marcos claimed without evidence that Yamashita's gold accounted for the bulk of the wealth of her husband, Ferdinand.

Many individuals and consortia, both Philippine and foreign, continue to search for treasure sites. A number of accidental deaths, injuries and financial losses incurred by treasure hunters have been reported. The National Museum of the Philippines is responsible for the issuance of treasure hunting permits and licenses.

== Treasure skeptics ==
Ricardo Trota Jose, history professor from the University of the Philippines, has questioned the theory that treasure from mainland Southeast Asia was transported to the Philippines: "By 1943 the Japanese were no longer in control of the seas... It doesn't make sense to bring in something that valuable here when you know it's going to be lost to the Americans anyway. The more rational thing would have been to send it to Taiwan or China."

Philippines National Historical Institute chairman and historian Ambeth Ocampo commented: "Two of the wealth myths I usually encounter are the Yamashita treasure and gossip that the Cojuangco fortune was founded on a bag of money..." Ocampo also said: "For the past 50 years, many people, both Filipinos and foreigners, have spent their time, money and energy in search of Yamashita's elusive treasure." Professor Ocampo noted "What makes me wonder is that for the past 50 years, despite all the treasure hunters, their maps, oral testimony and sophisticated metal detectors, nobody has found a thing."

== Rogelio Roxas lawsuit ==
In March 1988, a Filipino treasure hunter named Rogelio Roxas filed a lawsuit in the state of Hawaii against the former president of the Philippines, Ferdinand Marcos, and his wife Imelda for theft and human rights abuses. Roxas claimed that in Baguio in 1961 he met the son of a former member of the Japanese army who mapped for him the location of the legendary Yamashita Treasure. Roxas further claimed that a second man, who served as Yamashita's interpreter during World War II, told him of visiting an underground chamber where stores of gold and silver were kept, and who told of a golden buddha kept at a convent located near the underground chambers. Within the next few years, Roxas allegedly formed a group to search for the treasure, and obtained a permit for the purpose from a relative of Ferdinand, Judge Pio Marcos. Then, in 1971 Roxas and his group allegedly uncovered an enclosed chamber on state lands near Baguio where they found bayonets, samurai swords, radios, and skeletal remains dressed in a Japanese military uniform. Also found in the chamber, Roxas claimed, were a 3-foot-high (0.91 m) golden-colored Buddha and numerous stacked crates which filled an area approximately 6 feet x 6 feet x 35 feet. Roxas opened just one of the boxes, and found it packed with gold bullion. He said he took from the chamber the golden Buddha, which he estimated to weigh 1,000 kilograms, and one box with twenty-four gold bars, and hid them in his home. He then resealed the chamber for safekeeping until he could arrange the removal of the remaining boxes, which he suspected were also filled with gold bars. Roxas said he sold seven of the gold bars from the opened box, and sought potential buyers for the golden Buddha. Two individuals representing prospective buyers examined and tested the metal in the Buddha, Roxas said, and reported it was made of solid, 20-carat gold. It was soon after this, Roxas claimed, that President Ferdinand Marcos learned of Roxas' discovery and ordered him arrested, beaten, and the Buddha and remaining gold seized. Roxas alleged that in retaliation to his vocal campaign to reclaim the Buddha and the remainder of the treasure taken from him, Ferdinand continued to have Roxas threatened, beaten, and eventually incarcerated for over a year.

Following his release, Roxas put his claims against Marcos on hold until Ferdinand lost the presidency in 1986. But in 1988, Roxas and the Golden Budha Corporation, which now held the ownership rights to the treasure Roxas claims was stolen from him, filed suit against Ferdinand and wife Imelda in a Hawaiian state court seeking damages for the theft and the surrounding human rights abuses committed against Roxas. Roxas died on the eve of trial, but prior to his death he gave the deposition testimony that would later be used in evidence. In 1996, the Roxas estate and the Golden Budha Corporation received what was then the largest judgment ever awarded, $22 billion, which with interest increased to $40.5 billion. In 1998, the Hawaii Supreme Court held that there was sufficient evidence to support the jury's finding that Roxas found the treasure and that Marcos converted it. However, the court reversed the damage award, holding that the $22 billion award of damages for the chamber full of gold was too speculative, as there was no evidence of quantity or quality, and ordered a new hearing on the value of the golden Buddha and 17 bars of gold only. After several more years of legal proceedings, the Golden Budha Corporation obtained a final judgment against Imelda Marcos to the extent of her interest in the Marcos estate in the principal amount of $13 million, and Roxas' estate obtained a $6 million judgment on the claim for human right abuse.

The jury in this lawsuit ultimately concluded that Roxas did indeed find treasure, and although the Hawaiian state court was not required to determine whether this particular treasure was the legendary Yamashita's gold, the testimony relied upon by the court in reaching its conclusion pointed in that direction. Roxas was allegedly following a map from the son of a Japanese soldier; Roxas allegedly relied on tips provided from Yamashita's interpreter; and Roxas allegedly found samurai swords and the skeletons of dead Japanese soldiers in the treasure chamber. All this led the United States Ninth Circuit Court of Appeal to summarize the allegations leading to Roxas' final judgment as follows: "The Yamashita Treasure was found by Roxas and stolen from Roxas by Marcos's men."

== Events surrounding the excavation ==
In December 1969, rumors spread that gold bars had been found in the mountains about 40km away from Manila. In June 2018, local police arrested 17 people, including 4 Japanese, including a 15-year-old boy, and 13 Filipinos, for illegal mining on Capones Island for treasure.

== In popular culture ==
- A film about the alleged treasure, Yamashita: The Tiger's Treasure, directed by Chito S. Roño was released in the Philippines in 2001. It tells about a story of a former Filipino POW and his grandson torn between secret agents and a corrupt former Japanese soldier that is interested in the buried loot. The grandfather is the only surviving person who knows the location of the buried treasure.
- An episode of the American TV series Unsolved Mysteries, the first broadcast on American TV on January 27, 1993, discussed the fate of the loot that has supposedly been amassed by Gen. Yamashita
- The later part of the console game Medal of Honor: Rising Sun focuses around the gold
- Yamashita's gold serves as a plot element of Dragon, a novel by Clive Cussler, and in Gaijin Cowgirl, a novel by Jame DiBiasio. It also features the plot of Pursuit of the Golden Lily, a novel by R. Emery that was inspired by her father's wartime diary.
- Ore, or Or, a play by Duncan Pflaster, uses Yamashita's gold as a metaphor for the love lives of modern-day characters, one of whom is trying to determine if a crate of golden statues uncovered in the Philippines was part of Yamashita's hoard or not
- The Mystery of Yamashita's Map (2007), a novel by James McKenzie, tells the story of a group of treasure hunters who go in search of Yamashita's gold
- A TV show, Yamashita's Treasure, was broadcast by Singapore's Media, Mediacorp in 2010
- Yamashita's gold is a major plot element of Dead Mine, a 2013 horror film set on a remote Indonesian island
- The storyline of Tan Twan Eng's 2012 novel The Garden of Evening Mists is based around Imperial Japan's Golden Lily plan, the operation which amassed Yamashita's gold
- Colin Howell, a Northern Irish double murderer, lost the majority of the money he obtained by murdering his wife in a scam purporting to recover Yamashita's gold. This was dramatised on ITV in 2016 as The Secret.
- In the visual novel Umineko no Naku Koro ni, Yamashita's gold is alluded to in the 7th episode, in reference to the gold that the Ushiromiya head is supposed to hide
- In the TV series Expedition Unknown host Josh Gates travels to the Philippines to help treasure hunters search for the lost gold
- The History Channel aired a documentary series titled Lost Gold of World War II in 2019-2020, produced by AMPLE Entertainment, following a team of American investigators (unsuccessfully) searching for the gold. It features John Casey, Manny Paez, Bingo Minerva, Martin Flagg, Jeremy Mcmillan, JD Foringer, and Brad Carr
- The 2020 Korean comedy film The Golden Holiday revolves around their search for the gold.
- The treasure is a plot element in the 2021 film Dangerous.
- The treasure is a plot element in "Gold Digger" a 2025 episode of NCIS: Sydney

== See also ==
- Art theft and looting during World War II
- Confederate gold
- List of lost mines
- List of missing treasures
- Nazi gold
- Nazi plunder
- Operation Big Bird
- Presidential Commission on Good Government

== Sources ==
General

- Dunning, Brian (April 30, 2019). "Skeptoid #673: Yamashita's Gold". Skeptoid.
- Eng, Tan Twan (4 September 2012). The Garden of Evening Mists. Hachette Books. ISBN 978-1602861800.
- 天皇の金塊(1)世界大戦の戦費は日本が賄った？ (Emperor's Gold Nugget (1) Did Japan cover the cost of World War II?), (in Japanese) June 1, 2009
- 天皇の金塊(2)ゴールデン・リリーと霞ヶ関埋蔵金 (Emperor's Gold Nugget (2) Golden Lily and Kasumigaseki Reserve), (in Japanese) June 2, 2009
- 天皇の金塊(3)金塊秘匿の地下サイト (Emperor's Gold Nugget (3) Underground site of gold nugget concealment), (in Japanese) June 3, 2009
- 天皇の金塊(4)トレジャーハンターとマルコス裁判 (Emperor's Gold Nugget (4) Treasure Hunter and Marcos Trial), (in Japanese) June 4, 2009
- 国際金融の論が (Diagram of International Finance) (in Japanese)
- 天皇の金塊(5)...「金の百合」と国際金融相関図 (Emperor's Gold Nugget (5) ... "Golden Yuri" and International Financial Correlation Chart), (in Japanese) June 30, 2009
- 天皇の金塊(6)...「金の百合」とゴールド･カルテル (Emperor's Gold Nugget (6) ... "Golden Yuri" and Gold Cartel), (in Japanese) July 1, 2009

Related to Roxas v. Marcos

- "Supreme Court of Hawaii, Roxas v. Marcos, November 17, 1998"
- "460m War Booty Ruling vs. Marcos". New York Daily News. March 25, 1996. Archived from the original on April 30, 2019.
- "Honolulu Star-Bulletin, November 19, 1998"
- "Honolulu Star-Bulletin, Lawyers Debate Value of Stolen Gold, February 29, 2000"
- "Metropolitan News-Enterprise, Court Blocks Bid By Marcos Creditors To Collect From US Account, November 1, 2002"
- "Manila Standard Today, Marcos Victims Dying To Get Paid, January 28, 2006"
- "US Solicitor General, Department of Justice, Estate of Roxas v. Pimentel, Brief For The United States As Amicus Curiae, October 2007"
- "Office of Solicitor General, Republic of the Philippines, US Gov't Supports Philippines in the Arelma Case"
- "United States Court of Appeals, 464 F.3d 885, Merrill Lynch v. ENC Corp., September 12, 2006"
- "Supreme Court of Hawaii, Roxas v. Marcos, November 29, 2005"
