= Florida Playwrights' Theatre =

Florida Playwrights' Theatre or FPT was a 54-seat black box theatre in Hollywood, Florida that was in operation from 1993 to 1999. It was begun by Paul and Angela Thomas, whose goal was to create a small repertory company that would produce new plays and little-known plays, as well as the classics, including their annual Shakespeare festivals.

== New plays premiered ==
- "Apathy-The Gen X Musical" by Mickey Zetts (Both as a late-night 1995 and a mainstage 1997)
- "Love is a Masochist" by Mickey Zetts (shown with "The Piano that Jack Filled", adapted by Duncan Pflaster from the song-cycle by Adam Rabin) 1996.
- "Wilder and Wilder by Duncan Pflaster (Both as a late-night and a mainstage - 1995)
- "Amazing Dædalus" by Duncan Pflaster (Late-night 1997)
- "Audition Pieces" by Kim Mowrey
- "The Jessie Donovan Show" by Roberta Morgan

== Other plays produced ==
1993

- Dancin' to Calliope by Jack Gilhooley
- Eli: A Mystery Play of the Sufferings of Israel by Nelly Sachs
- The Mystery of Irma Vep by Charles Ludlam
- Sister Mary Ignatius Explains It All for You by Christopher Durang
- Psycho Beach Party by Charles Busch
- Greater Tuna by Jaston Williams, Joe Sears, and Ed Howard
- 1st Annual Shakespeare Festival
  - Twelfth Night
  - As You Like It
- The Miss Firecracker Contest by Beth Henley
- Double bill of Graceland by Ellen Byron and Line by Israel Horovitz

1994

- Oedipus Rex by Sophocles
- The House of Blue Leaves by John Guare
- The Taming of the Shrew by William Shakespeare
- Messiah by Martin Sherman
- A Woman Called Truth: The Story of Sojourner Truth by Sandra Fenichel Asher
- The Children's Hour by Lillian Hellman

1995

- Angel City by Sam Shepard
- Lenny by Julian Barry (Carbonell Award won for Best Actor Todd Durkin, nominated for Best Supporting Actor Larry Jurrist)
- 2nd Annual Shakespeare Festival
  - Much Ado About Nothing
  - A Midsummer Night's Dream
- The Secret Lives of The Sexists by Charles Ludlam
- Laundry and Bourbon and Lone Star by James McLure
- What The Butler Saw by Joe Orton
- Oleanna by David Mamet
- The Loman Family Picnic by Donald Margulies
- On the Verge (or The Geography of Yearning) by Eric Overmeyer
- Reckless by Craig Lucas

1996

- Macbeth by William Shakespeare
- Talk Radio by Eric Bogosian
- 3rd Annual Shakespeare Festival
  - The Comedy of Errors
  - Two Gentlemen of Verona
- The Mystery of Irma Vep by Charles Ludlam
- Laughing Wild by Christopher Durang (Carbonell Award 'nomination for Best Actress Angela Thomas)
- American Buffalo by David Mamet
- Times Square Angel by Charles Busch

1997

- Betty the Yeti: An Eco Fable by Jon Klein
- 4th Annual Shakespeare Festival
  - The Merry Wives of Windsor
  - Romeo and Juliet
- The Diary of Anne Frank by Frances Goodrich and Albert Hackett
- Mass Appeal by Bill C. Davis

1998

- 5th Annual Shakespeare Festival
  - Hamlet
  - The Tempest
- Black Comedy/White Lies by Peter Shaffer
- The Art of Dining by Tina Howe
- Titanic by Christopher Durang
