= Educational Theatre Association =

- Abbreviation: EdTA
- Formation: 1929; 97 years ago
- Type: Non-profit
- Location: Cincinnati, OH
- Affiliations: International Thespian Society; Educational Theatre Foundation
- Website: schooltheatre.org

The Educational Theatre Association (abbreviated as EdTA), founded in 1929, is an international nonprofit that serves as the professional association for theatre educators. EdTA is the parent organization of the International Thespian Society (ITS), the honor society for theatre students that's inducted more than 2.5 million Thespians since its founding. Additionally, EdTA operates the Educational Theatre Foundation, the organization's philanthropic arm dedicated to broadening representation and increasing access.

EdTA operates programs including International Thespian Festival, the annual Theatre Education Conference, and the International Thespian Excellence Awards (a.k.a. Thespys). The Educational Theatre Foundation offers a variety of grants and scholarships for theatre educators, school theatre programs, and students.
