= Rogelio Roxas =

Filipino soldier (1943/4 – 1993)

- Born: 1943 or 1944
- Died: May 25, 1993 (aged 49 or 50); Philippines
- Other name: Roger Roxas
- Occupations: Soldier, Locksmith
- Known for: Possibly discovering a portion of Yamashita treasure

Rogelio "Roger" Domingo Roxas (1943 or 1944 – May 25, 1993) was a former Filipino soldier who had worked as a locksmith before allegedly discovering in a cave north of Manila a hidden chamber full of gold bars and a giant golden Buddha statue – which Roxas estimated to weigh one metric ton – on a plot of state-owned land near Baguio General Hospital, in Baguio on January 24, 1971. Roxas claimed that the Buddha's head was removable and that it concealed a hollowed-out portion within the statue that contained at least two handfuls of uncut diamonds. The cache was alleged to be a portion of the legendary Yamashita treasure.

== Seizure of gold ==
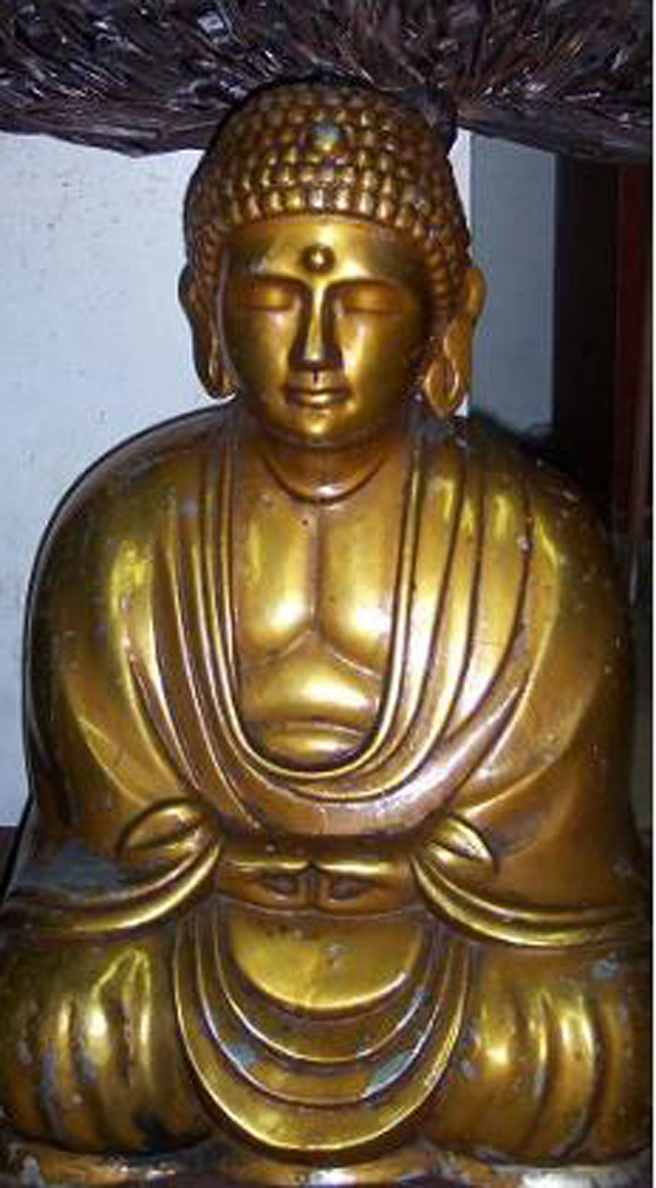
Replica lead copper/bronze overlay Buddha statue, of a solid gold statue, that was returned by Ferdinand Marcos after he allegedly had his armed troops steal the original gold statue at gunpoint from Rogelio Roxas and family.

On April 6, 1971, Roxas claimed that armed men purportedly from the National Bureau of Investigation and the Criminal Investigation Service forcibly confiscated the gold bars and statue from his home in Aurora Hill, Baguio. On April 19, 1971, the military deposited a Buddha statue at the Baguio City Court; however, Roxas proclaimed that it was not the same statue taken from him. Roxas later claimed that then-President Ferdinand Marcos orchestrated the raid and was in possession of the treasure. Roxas was arrested in Cabanatuan by three men in civilian clothing on May 18, 1971, and jailed for 2 years.

== Roxas v. Marcos lawsuit ==
In March 1988, a US lawsuit was filed by Rogelio Roxas against former Philippine president, Ferdinand Marcos and his wife Imelda Marcos. Roxas alleged that he was a treasure hunter who in 1971 was searching for Yamashita's gold. In determining whether there was sufficient evidence to support Roxas' claim, the court considered the following evidence and testimony submitted by Roxas:

Sometime in 1970, Roxas's group began digging on state lands near the Baguio General Hospital. After approximately seven months of searching and digging "24 hours a day," the group broke into a system of tunnels. Inside the tunnels, the group found wiring, radios, bayonets, rifles, and a human skeleton wearing a Japanese army uniform. After several weeks spent digging and exploring within the tunnels, Roxas's group discovered a ten-foot thick concrete enclosure in the floor of the tunnel. On January 24, 1971, the group broke through the enclosure. Inside, Roxas discovered a gold-colored buddha statue, which he estimated to be about three feet in height. The statue was extremely heavy; it required ten men to transport it to the surface using a chain block hoist, ropes and rolling logs. Although he never weighed the statue, Roxas estimated its weight to be 1 tonne. Roxas directed his laborers to transport the statue to his home and place it in a closet. Roxas also found a large pile of boxes underneath the concrete enclosure, approximately fifty feet from where the buddha statue had been discovered. He returned the next day and opened one small box, which contained twenty-four one-inch by two-and-one-half-inch bars of gold. Roxas estimated that the boxes were, on average, approximately the size of a case of beer and that they were stacked five or six feet high, over an area six feet wide and thirty feet long. Roxas did not open any of the other boxes. Several weeks later, Roxas returned to blast the tunnel closed, planning to sell the buddha statue in order to obtain funds for an operation to remove the remaining treasure. Before blasting the tunnel closed, Roxas removed the twenty-four bars of gold, as well as some samurai swords, bayonets and other artifacts. Roxas twice attempted to report his find to Judge Marcos, but was unsuccessful in contacting him. During the following weeks, Roxas sold seven of the gold bars and sought a buyer for the golden buddha. Roxas testified that Kenneth Cheatham, the representative of one prospective buyer, drilled a small hole under the arm of the buddha and assayed the metal. The test revealed the statue to be solid twenty-two carat gold. Roxas also testified that a second prospective buyer, Luis Mendoza, also tested the metal of the statue using nitric acid and concluded that it was "more than 20 carats."

Roxas claimed that after he discovered the treasure, he was arrested by Marcos, the treasure was seized, and he was tortured. After his release, Roxas died under suspicious circumstance, leading to speculation that he had been murdered. The lawsuit was asserted by his estate and The Golden Budha [sic] Corporation, a company formed for the purpose of asserting Roxas' rights to the treasure. In 1996, a jury in Honolulu awarded $22 billion in compensatory damages that increased with interest to over $40 billion. The jury did not award punitive damages. On November 17, 1998, the Hawaii Supreme Court reversed the $41 billion judgment against Ferdinand and Imelda Marcos. A justice department statistical bulletin on civil verdicts claims that the court found insufficient evidence that Roxas had actually discovered the gold bullion while treasure hunting north of Manila in 1971. However, the actual judicial decision of the court only cites insufficient evidence to establish the quantity and quality of the gold bullion found and left in the concrete chamber: "...there was insufficient evidence to support an award of damages for such gold bullion as may have been contained in the unopened boxes allegedly found by Roxas, inasmuch as the record was speculative regarding the gold's quantity and purity..."

Furthermore, the Court sustained the portion of the verdict that found that Marcos had stolen the golden Buddha and 17 bars of gold (the 24 bars Roxas took out of the chamber minus the seven that he sold). With respect to this claim, the Hawaii Supreme Court specifically found as follows: 1) "There was sufficient evidence to support the jury's special finding that Ferdinand converted the treasure that Roxas found"; and 2) "There was sufficient evidence to support the jury's determination that Roxas 'found' the treasure pursuant to Philippine law." The case was remanded to the trial court for a new trial on the value of the converted golden buddha statue and gold bars.

On February 28, 2000, the trial court conducted a hearing to determine the value of the golden Buddha and the 17 bars of gold. Currently, Felix Dacanay, as the personal representative of Roxas' estate, has a judgment against Imelda Marcos in her personal capacity to the extent of her interest in the Estate of Ferdinand E. Marcos in the principal amount of $6 million for the human rights claims concerning Roxas' arrest and torture, and the Golden Budha Corp. has a judgment against Imelda Marcos in her personal capacity to the extent of her interest in the Marcos estate in the principal amount of $13,275,848.37 on the claim of the converted treasure. That judgment was ordered affirmed by the Hawaii Supreme Court on November 25, 2005. In a related legal proceeding in 2006, the United States Ninth Circuit Court of Appeal while describing the findings of the Roxas v. Marcos litigation stated: "The Yamashita Treasure was discovered by Roxas and stolen from Roxas by Marcos’s men."

Roxas turned over claims to the treasure to a group of American investors, which filed suit in Hawaii. A jury awarded $22 billion to an American company that claims the late Philippine President Ferdinand E. Marcos stole a golden Buddha statue filled with gems from a treasure hunter... "As far as I know, it is the largest verdict probably in the history of jurisprudence in the world," said Daniel Cathcart, attorney for the Atlanta-based Golden Buddha Corp. But a Marcos family attorney dismissed the award, which a state jury reached in less than five hours of deliberations... "It's noncollectible. It's Monopoly money," attorney James Paul Linn said. "Everything in the Marcos estate is tied up by the Philippine government... There's no money there."

Judge Antonio Reyes of the Baguio Regional Trial Court had declared in a ruling on May 30, 1996, that the golden Buddha was only a bronze-plated statuette. In fact, it was in the court's custody in Baguio. "The US court's decision implies that the golden Buddha existed. I don't know how the conclusion was arrived," the judge said. The statuette in the court's custody was surrendered by police days after Rogelio complained that his Golden Buddha had been seized by Marcos. Roxas died in 1993. His relatives claimed that the statuette that was returned to his family was a replica. In 1995, Roxas's eldest son Jose petitioned the court to release the statuette to him as a memento of his father's treasure hunting days. Jose also declared in court that his father never found a Golden Buddha.

== See also ==
- Yamashita's gold
- Unexplained wealth of the Marcos family
