= The Yamato Dynasty =

1999 nonfiction book

The Yamato Dynasty: The Secret History of Japan's Imperial Family
- Author: Sterling Seagrave
- Language: English
- Genre: Nonfiction
- Publisher: Bantam Press
- Publication date: 1999
- Publication place: Great Britain
- Pages: 426
- ISBN: 0-593-04523-8

The Yamato Dynasty: The Secret History of Japan's Imperial Family is a 1999 non-fiction book by historian Sterling Seagrave and Peggy Seagrave. The full text is divided into 13 chapters in total. The book is a biography of the imperial house of Japan since the Meiji Restoration stretching across five generations: Emperor Kōmei, Emperor Meiji, Emperor Taishō, Emperor Shōwa, and Emperor Heisei.

== Overview ==
The book begins with the Tokugawa Shogunate and Emperor Kōmei's reactions to the internal turmoil created by the Perry Expedition which forced Japan to revise its isolationist policies and open up diplomatic and trade relations with the West. Throughout is included a general overview of Japan's feudal system, the various clans which ruled over it, and their relationships with the outside world at the time.

The 1866 Satsuma-Chōshū Alliance resulted in the overthrow of the Tokugawa Shogunate and the glorification of the Emperor of Japan. This glorification, however, necessitated the need to carefully manage every aspect of the imperial family's life and appearances. Emperor Kōmei's death meant that rule was inherited by Emperor Meiji, who at the time was only 15 years old and influenced by and reliant on his court advisors. Focus is put on those who were exerting influence over the Emperor's upbringing, lifestyle, or advising his decisions, as well as members of the Imperial family.

When Emperor Meiji died, he was succeeded by Emperor Taishō, whose disabilities and eccentricities led to further sequestering of the Imperial family. As his condition deteriorated, the ability of the genrō, Keeper of the Privy Seal, and Imperial Household Minister to manipulate imperial decisions came to become a matter of common knowledge.

Succeeding Taishō was Emperor Hirohito, known formally by his Japanese era name as Emperor Shōwa, who reigned over the longest era in Japanese history starting in 1926 until his death in 1989. Much of the book details the life experiences and upbringings of Hirohito and his family and examines their role in the Second Sino-Japanese War, Operation Golden Lily, and World War II as well as their collaboration with the American government during the occupation of Japan in order to avoid being held responsible for the war.

The book ends by briefly examining Emperor Heisei's life and rise to the throne, who by the time of the book's release had only been crowned the year before.

== Reception ==
Foreign Affairs reviewer Richard N. Cooper said "this sensational book really focuses on World War II, especially Emperor Hirohito's complicity in Japanese war plans" and that it was "a good read, but it drags in old rumors... without offering any new evidence or fresh Japanese sources." He rejected the authors' argument about Operation Golden Lily that "extensive loot, mainly gold and gemstones, laid the basis for Japan's remarkable postwar economic recovery."

The New York Times reviewed it as "a book that presents a darkly cartoonish view of modern Japan [that] contains elements of truth." It said that the "key sources are weak, or missing altogether" about the book's claims made about Operation Golden Lily and that "big conspiracy theories require big proof, and the Seagraves fail to provide it."

South China Morning Post reviewed it as "contain[ing] all the elements of a political thriller: family squabbles, power struggles, duplicity and murder," and said that it was "an incisive biography of five generations of Japan's imperial family since the Meiji Restoration in 1868."

Publishers Weekly reviewed the book saying it "dramatically brings the imperial family--and those behind it--to life, offering readers an intriguing glimpse behind the long-maintained veil of secrecy."
