= Duncan Pflaster =

American dramatist

- Occupation: Playwright
- Years active: 1995-present
- Notable work: The Underpants Godot (play), Strapped for Danger (movie)

Duncan Pflaster (born 1973) is an American off-off-Broadway playwright, composer and actor. His first play Wilder and Wilder (a transvestite adaptation of Alice in Wonderland), was produced in 1995 at Florida Playwrights' Theatre in Hollywood, FL. He now lives in New York City, where many of his plays have been produced in theatre festivals, such as the Spotlight On festival and the Midtown International Theatre Festival. His first film Strapped for Danger was produced by Scorpio Film Releasing in 2017, and the sequel Undercover Vice: Strapped for Danger II followed in 2021. Scorpio Film Releasing also brought him in for additional material on their film Code Name: Dynastud.

His plays have often been labeled as magic realism; they frequently deal with metaphysical or science fiction plots, such as parallel universes, cloning, life extension, fairy tales and mythology. His writing often touches on themes of family, community, religion, and homosexuality. Pflaster is gay. Many of his plays include nudity and frank sexual situations. Pflaster is also a verse dramatist, writing in both rhyming couplets and blank verse.

== Awards ==
- The Underpants Godot
  - 2015 UNFringed Festival Award, Best Play
- Keeping Everything Straight (formerly titled Messin' With the Kid)
  - Full-length Play Winner of the 4th Annual Vittum Prize for 2014.
- Pocket Universe
  - One of the 8 winners of the Independent Play(w)rights Ten Minute Play Contest!
- Fourteen Hundred and Sixty Sketches of Your Left Hand At The Secret Theatre, 2013
  - 2013 UNFringed Festival Award, Best Play
  - 2013 UNFringed Festival Award, Best Actor, Emilio P. Tirado
- The Taint of Equality
  - 2012 Planet Connections Award, Outstanding Supporting Actor, Roberto Alexander
  - 2012 Planet Connections Award, Outstanding Sound Design, Duncan Pflaster
- The Wastes of Time
  - 2012 Fruits of Distinction Award, Best Actress, Susan Barnes Walker
- Bill's Threesome
  - 2012 Fruits of Distinction Award, Best Comedy Skit
- The Tragedy of Dandelion
  - "Audience Favorite", MT Works NewBorn Festival 2012
  - Semi-Finalist, Eugene O'Neill National Playwrights Conference 2011
- Sweeter Dreams
  - 2011 Planet Connections Award, Outstanding Supporting Actor, Douglas Rossi
  - 2011 Planet Connections Award, Outstanding Supporting Actress, Clara Barton Green
- Mine or Yours
  - 2nd Place, Fresh Fruit Festival One-Act Competition
- Say Something Shocking, or the spit-take Play
  - Winner Spare Change Theater's 2011 One-Minute Play Festival
- The Empress of Sex
  - "Audience Favorite", MT Works NewBorn Festival 2011
  - Semi-Finalist, About Face Theatre's 2010 XYZ Festival of New Work
- The Starship Astrov
  - 2010 MITF Award, Outstanding Supporting Actress, Jennifer Gawlik
- The Thyme of the Season
  - 2010 Planet Connections Award, "Outstanding Playwriting for an Adaptation, Revival or Sequel"
  - 2010 Planet Connections Award, "Outstanding Costumes" Mark Richard Caswell
  - 2010 Planet Connections Congeniality Award – Duncan Pflaster
- 2009 MITF Award, "Outstanding Supporting Actor" for his performance in Kyle Baxter and John Crefeld's I Hate Love.
- Prince Trevor Amongst the Elephants
  - 2008 MITF Award, "Outstanding Playwriting for a New Script Play OR Book of a Musical" (Tie with Monica Bauer for The Higher Education of Khalid Amir)
  - 2008 MITF Award, "Outstanding Overall Production of a New Comedy Play"
  - 2008 MITF Award, "Outstanding Lead Actor in a Play" Carlos Rafael Fernández (Tie with Eric Percival for Bubby's Shadow)
  - 2006 Spotlight On Award, "Best New Play (Writer's Award)"
- Eternity: Time Without End
  - 2005 Spotlight On Award, "Best New Play (Writer's Award)"
  - 2005 Spotlight On Award, Best Actress Clara Barton Green
  - 2005 Spotlight On Award, Best Supporting Actor Jason Specland
  - 2005 Spotlight On Award, Featured Actor Joe Fanelli

== Works ==
Full-length

- The Underpants Godot – A comedy about a director who wants to put on Waiting For Godot with hot guys in underwear instead of old men. A representative from the Beckett Estate crashes a dress rehearsal to investigate. Produced 2015 in UNFringed Festival at The Secret Theatre, with a full production in September 2016 produced by The Secret Theatre. Two monologues from the play are published in Smith & Kraus' The Best Men's Stage Monologues 2016. 2018 production with Nearly Naked Theatre in Phoenix, Arizona. 2019 Production with Theatre Rhinoceros in San Francisco, California.
- A Touch of Cinema – A drama about a female screenwriter in an unnamed country who has been put under house arrest, her art censored by a new fascist regime. Premiered April 2017 in the Spotlight On Festival at The Wild Project in the East Village, NYC.
- The Tragedy of Dandelion – A five-act Shakespearean tragedy entirely in iambic pentameter, about a transgender/lesbian princess named Dandelion. – Produced by Ego Actus, 2014
- Fourteen Hundred and Sixty Sketches of Your Left Hand At The Secret Theatre, 2013 – Winner Best Script and Best Actor, Emilio P. Tirado
- The Taint of Equality – A social farce about a gay couple who don't believe that gays should get married as straight people do. – Planet Connections Theatre Festivity 2012, a monologue from it is published in Smith & Kraus' The Best Men's Stage Monologues 2013 – Winner, best sound design
- The Empress of Sex – An erotic romantic comedy set in Ancient Greece – Planet Connections Theatre Festivity 2012
- Sweeter Dreams – A multimedia play about an independent filmmaker in a love triangle with her husband and her leading actor. – 2011 Winner best Supporting Actress Clara Barton Green and Best Supporting Actor Douglas Rossi
- The Starship Astrov – A play using Chekhovian tropes to explore life on a space ship that doesn't have weekly adventures.
- Suckers – A comic vampire play – 2009
- Ore, or Or – A love story about greed and lust and Yamashita's Gold – 2009
- The Thyme of the Season ~or~ A Mid-Autumn Night's Dream – a sequel to Shakespeare's A Midsummer Night's Dream. – 2007
- Admit Impediments – A musical about marriage – gay, straight, and convenient – 2007
- The Wastes of Time – A gay love story dealing with the generation gap surrounding the AIDS crisis – 2006
- Prince Trevor Amongst the Elephants – A big epic naked Shakespearean fairy tale play – 2005
- Eternity: Time Without End – Eleven people come to a secluded beach looking for the fountain of youth; but when they find it, it's not what they expected – 2004
- Sleeping in Tomorrow – A play about parallel universes, in which the main character visits the same cocktail party in different dimensions – 2002
- Dik and Jayne are Not the Same – A play about cloning and lesbians – but not about cloning lesbians – 2001
- Amazing Dædalus – A play about what happens in the time between myths – 1998
- Eskimo: The Musical
- Wilder and Wilder – A transvestite adaptation of Alice in Wonderland, crossed with Walk on the Wild Side
- Messin' With the Kid – A dark play about a young man who is a male stripper to support his younger brother through high school.
- Light and Noise and Bees and Boys – A drama about a Lesbian who suffers memory loss from a stroke and who doesn't remember that she came out of the closet.
- Malvolio's Revenge – A sequel to Twelfth Night, queering the text.
- Nothing but Thunder – A verse comedy about a young Dionysus going to the underworld to rescue his mother Semele.
- Cockeye(D) – An adaptation of The Bacchae, which is about a young film star accusing an older director of molestation, set against an all-male adaptation of The Bacchae.

One-Acts

- Pocket Universe – A gay play about a scientist who makes a virtual universe for his office crush. Published in Smith & Kraus' Best 10-Minute Plays 2013, and in Independent Play(w)rights' Ten Minute Play Anthology.
- Suggested Donation – A grumpy theatre patron takes exception to the suggested donation for wine at intermission of a play. Produced by Old Library Theatre in Fair Lawn, New Jersey in 2018 and The Secret Theatre's One-act Festival in 2017.
- Hate Myself in the Morning – A play about the army and political prisoners, played out between a young woman and the policeman she brings home for a one-night stand.
- Mine Or Yours – A gay guy and his fag hag attempt to discern from clues whether an attractive man at a bar is gay or straight.
- Patrick and Lisa's Wedding – A bridesmaid ducks out of the wedding reception of her ex-boyfriend, and ends up bumping into the young bride, who is having second thoughts about her new husband.
- The Fugly Train – Two young pretty women have a philosophical crisis on the subway.
- Six Silences in Three Movements – An experimental work which contrasts the things people don't say in a relationship.
- Hold Thy Peace, Thou Knave – Backstage at a production of Twelfth Night, a last-minute understudy for Sir Toby Belch goes a little haywire onstage, causing consternation amongst the rest of the cast.
- First to Fall Asleep – A dark comedy about frat hijinx that get out of hand when a freshman passes out at a frat party.
- Prince Charming, presented without comment – An advertising executive begins to question the saleability of Cinderella and questions the women in his life about their feelings on the topic.
- New Lang Syne – Two ex-college friends who had a brief fling meet by coincidence on New Year's Day. One has continued the party lifestyle, while the other is responsible and sober.
- (they kiss) – A playwright writes and stars in a play so he can get to kiss an actress he has a crush on.

== Non-playwright work ==
First film Strapped for Danger produced by Scorpio Film Releasing in 2017. A comic LGBTQ heist film about 3 male strippers who hide out in a frat house. An homage to the films of Russ Meyer.

He wrote comic sketches for Laughing Swingset Productions, available on YouTube and Funny Or Die.

He has also written freelance theatre reviews for BroadwayWorld.com and HX magazine.

He has written music on SongFight! under the name Level Nivelo – the band name is a reference to the Esperanto used in Red Dwarf

He is also the creator of and head photographer for The Naughty Jewish Boys Calendar, a photographic pinup calendar highlighting the erotic side of Jewish men.
