= Cindy Elavsky =

American journalist

Cindy Elavsky is a syndicated columnist who writes the Celebrity Extra column for King Features.

Elavsky was born in Massillon, Ohio. Her family moved to Orlando, Florida in 1987. She graduated from Oviedo High School in 1990 and earned a bachelor's degree in English in 1996 and a second degree in theater in 2001 from the University of Central Florida. She was a member of Sigma Tau Delta and Alpha Psi Omega honor societies.

Elavsky started her career as a proofreader with Reed Brennan Associates of Orlando, later becoming Assistant Managing Editor and Syndicate Editor.
