= List of annual cultural events in Lincoln, Nebraska =

Lincoln, Nebraska hosts various cultural events throughout the year. This list is broken into seasons on a calendar year. (Note: Some events extend beyond the season the event is listed under.)

== Mid to late winter ==
- Mid February: Abraham Lincoln Birthday Celebration
- Late February or early March: Nebraska State High School Swimming & Diving Championships; Lincoln Polar Plunge
- March: Nebraska State High School Basketball Championships

== Spring ==
- April: Lincoln Earth Day
- Mid April: ConStellation Science Fiction Convention
- First Saturday in May: Mayor's Run
- First Sunday in May: Lincoln National Guard Marathon and Half-Marathon
- Third Saturday in May: James Arthur Vineyards Renaissance Festival
- May 13 to July 17: Horse racing at Lincoln Race Course
- Mid May: Wake Up the Beds
- Mid May through Fall: Party in the Parks
- Early May to late October: The Haymarket Farmers' Market in the Historic Haymarket

== Summer ==
- Early June: Cornhusker Boys' and Girls' State; Havelock Charity Run; Celebrate Lincoln
- Mid June: Formula SAE Lincoln
- Tuesday evenings in June: Jazz in June
- Third Friday in June, July and August: Dock Stock
- Late June: International Thespian Festival; Trail Trek
- July 3: Uncle Sam Jam
- Second half of July: Cornhusker State Games (multi-location event)
- Early August: Lancaster County Fair
- Second weekend in August: Capital City Ribfest
- Late August: Lincoln ZombieFest; Nebraska Mud Run
- Late August to late November: University of Nebraska Cornhusker Football

== Fall/autumn ==
- Early September: Sports Car Club of America Solo National Championship Autocross
- Mid September: Streets Alive!
- Late September: Nebraska City AppleJack Festival
- Late September/Early October: Lincoln Calling
- Second Saturday in October: Pumpkin Run; Market to Market Relay Nebraska
- Late October: Boo at the Zoo
- November: Nebraska State High School Football Championships; Nebraska State High School Volleyball Championships
- Early November: The Good Life Halfsy
- First Saturday in November: Put the Beds to Bed
- Mid November: Shop the Blocks
- November 11: Veterans Day Walk of Recognition, program at Auld Recreation Center

== Early winter ==
- Second Sunday in December: Nebraska State Christmas Tree Lighting Ceremony and Carol Sing
