= Jamie Campbell (comedian) =

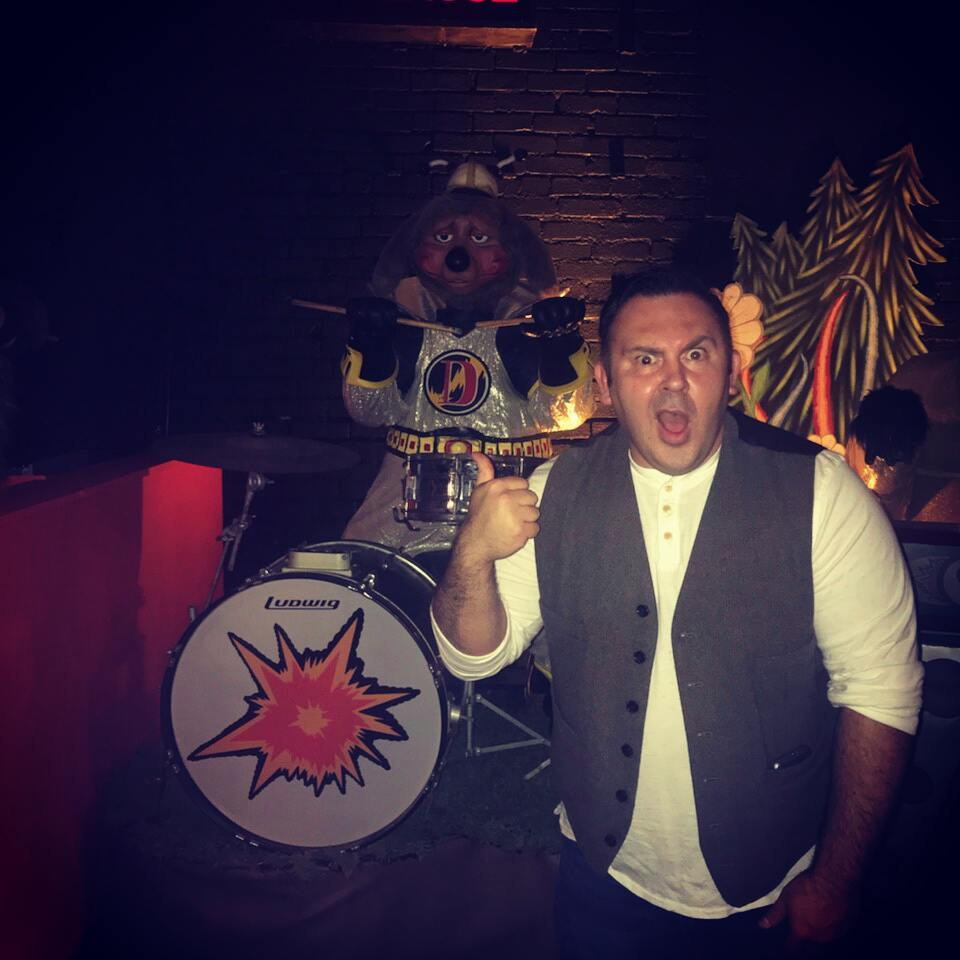
- Campbell at Rockafire Arcade Bar in Kansas City, Missouri, May 2018.
- Education: Northeastern State University

Comedy career
- Genres: Stand-up, sketch
- Website: jamiecampbellcomedy.com

Jamie Campbell is an American comedian, actor, improviser and playwright.

== Early life ==
Campbell was born in Pryor, Oklahoma, to teenage parents whose marriage ended shortly after his birth. Growing up amid a custody dispute, he moved frequently and attended 13 schools between kindergarten and high school, and recalled that "to make new friends, being funny really helped." He moved around several Oklahoma communities, such as Pryor, Oklahoma City, and Stillwater, as well as in South Florida with his father. At age 19, he returned to Pryor and worked in a warehouse for the computer company ViaGrafix at the MidAmerica Industrial Park, an industrial park developed by his great-grandfather Gene Redden.

To pay for college tuition, Campbell enlisted in the National Guard and enrolled at Northeastern State University (NSU). He had not initially planned to pursue acting, but he auditioned for the outdoor historical drama Trail of Tears, landed a principal role, and subsequently majored in theater. During college, he starred as King Henry in The Lion in Winter and Brutus in Julius Caesar. He performed stand-up comedy for the first time during a holiday show affiliated with NSU's River City Players Downtown Country Revue, the program that also launched the early stage career of fellow NSU student Carrie Underwood.

After graduating from NSU, Campbell worked in theater in Roanoke, Virginia, before returning to Stillwater to begin a master's degree at Oklahoma State University. While at Oklahoma State, he was accepted into a semester program at Columbia College with the Second City in Chicago, Illinois, and left his graduate program to pursue comedy full time.

== Career ==
Campbell began doing stand-up comedy in 2008. While studying at the Second City in Chicago, he collaborated with Amanda Murphy to co-write the one-act musical four play, which he also directed for its May 2010 premiere at StudioBe. In 2012, Campbell performed as former mayor Richard M. Daley at RedEye's 10th anniversary at Laugh Factory. He was named Best Stand-Up Comedian by the Chicago Reader, in 2013.

In 2015, Campbell signed with New Jersey independent record label Mint 400 Records, releasing his debut stand-up album Tell Me You're Proud of Me followed by Stocking Stuffer later that same year. Monique Madrid of New York called Campbell "one of the hardest working comedians in Chicago."

Campbell's one-man show The Devil on the Wall debuted and won Best of Fringe at the Kansas City Fringe Festival in 2018, and explored themes of abuse, bullying, and juvenile delinquency. Reviewing a 2019 performance, the Arizona Daily Star said "throughout this immersive autobiography, we, as an audience, laughed, gasped and empathized as the often jovial ride halted at poignant emotional places," adding "the story has been so well thought-out [...] that I found myself too captivated to look away even for a second."

In July 2022, Campbell premiered his solo show Big Dad Energy at the Kansas City Fringe Festival, where it won Best of Fringe honors. The show explores societal expectations and choosing not to have children, marking a deliberate shift toward a hopeful, uplifting comedy style; The Pitch's Hannah Scott noted that Campbell works to ensure his sets "are never punching down but instead bring light to the absurdities of life and leave the audience with more positivity than existential dread." Campbell toured Big Dad Energy nationally in 2023, including festivals in Washington, D.C., Dallas, Minneapolis, Milwaukee, and back in his home state of Oklahoma, where he performed a benefit for 4RKids in Enid, The Theatre Crude Fringe Festival in Oklahoma City, and a scholarship benefit at Rogers State University—earning positive reviews from outlets including the Twin Cities Pioneer Press, Dallas Theater Journal, and DC Theater Arts. A filmed version of Big Dad Energy debuted on YouTube on Labor Day in September 2023, and a bit from the special comparing LGBTQ rights arguments to pineapple on pizza drew coverage from LGBTQ Nation. In February 2025, an audio album version of Big Dad Energy was released via Mint 400 Records.

In addition to stand-up, Campbell has continued working in film, television, and screenwriting. In January 2023, he filmed a 988 mental health hotline commercial in Oklahoma alongside fellow Oklahoma native Kristin Chenoweth. He also starred as Dad in the independent horror comedy film Taffy. In 2023, his short screenplay "Sneakerhead" won top honors in the screenwriting competition at the Dallas International Film Festival.

In November 2025, Dry Bar Comedy released Campbell's stand-up special, Middle-Aged, Married, and Barely Holding It Together, on YouTube and on its website. At the Kansas City Fringe Festival in July 2026, he debuted the solo comedy show Cancer?! I Hardly Know Her!, centered on his colon cancer diagnosis and recovery. KC Studio highlighted it as a standout production of the festival. Campbell is a rostered touring artist with the Kansas Creative Arts Industries Commission.

== Discography and specials ==
==== Albums ====
- Tell Me You're Proud of Me (2015)
- Stocking Stuffer (2015)
- Big Dad Energy (2025)

==== Comedy Specials ====
- Big Dad Energy (2023)
- Middle-Aged, Married, and Barely Holding It Together (2025)
