= Castle Bank & Trust (Bahamas) =

Bank of the Bahamas

- Industry: Banking
- Founded: 1962
- Founders: Paul Helliwell, Burton Kanter
- Defunct: 1977
- Headquarters: Nassau, Bahamas

Castle Bank & Trust was a Bahamian bank that was involved in tax evasion, as well as covertly funneling funds for the Central Intelligence Agency (CIA). The bank was founded in 1962 by Paul Helliwell, a former Office of Strategic Services and latter CIA officer, and Burton Kanter, a tax lawyer.

The bank was used by the CIA to funnel money for covert military operations, including those at Andros Island, a staging area for anti-Castro activities.

The bank had many clients, including celebrities, organized crime figures, and wealthy business owners. Some of the most notable included John Fogerty and other members of Creedence Clearwater Revival, who lost most of their wealth when the bank collapsed, Tony Curtis, Hugh Hefner, Penthouse, and members of the Pritzker family (owners of the Hyatt hotel chain). Reputed organized crime members that were customers included Moe Dalitz, Morris Kleinman, and Samuel A. Tucker.

In the early 1970s, the U.S. Internal Revenue Service started an investigation into the tax avoidance schemes used by the bank. The investigation was called Operation Tradewinds. The IRS was able to secretly photograph a list of the bank's clients, after being provided with a bank executive's briefcase that was taken from the executive's apartment by an IRS informant. As a result of this information, the IRS launched a new investigation, called Project Haven, into the tax affairs of the people on the client list. A prosecution of one of those clients eventually reached the United States Supreme Court as United States v. Payner. Project Haven was later suspended because the names of the clients was obtained from the briefcase in an illegal search. The Department of Justice also dropped its investigation for the same reason.

According to The Wall Street Journal reporter Jim Drinkhall, the case was later dropped because of pressure from the CIA, which had been using the bank as a front to fund covert operations.

Burton Kanter was tried, but acquitted in 1977 in a case involving tax evasion on the sale of a Reno, Nevada hotel using an account at Castle Bank & Trust. However, his law partner, Roger Baskes, was convicted in the case. In 1982, attorney Calvin Eisenberg, another of Kanter's law partners, was convicted of advising in the preparation of false tax returns in a scheme using Castle Bank & Trust.

== See also ==
- Air America (airline)
- Allegations of CIA drug trafficking
- Bank of Credit and Commerce International
- CIA involvement in Contra cocaine trafficking
- Nugan Hand Bank
- Panama Papers (North America)
- Riggs Bank
- War on drugs
