= Sterling Seagrave =

American historian (1937–2017)

- Born: April 15, 1937; Columbus, Ohio, U.S.
- Died: May 1, 2017 (aged 80); France
- Occupations: Writer, investigative journalist, and historian
- Spouse: Peggy Sawyer Seagrave
- Children: Jocelyn (daughter); Sean (son)
- Relatives: Gordon Seagrave (father)

Sterling Seagrave (April 15, 1937 – May 1, 2017) was an American historian. He was the author of numerous books which address unofficial and clandestine aspects of the 20th-century political history of countries in the Far East.

== Personal life ==
Born in Columbus, Ohio on April 15, 1937, Seagrave grew up on the China-Myanmar border, the fifth generation of an American family living in the Orient for nearly two centuries (his father was Dr. Gordon Seagrave, author of Burma Surgeon). He and his family moved to Corpus Christi, Texas and he attended W. B. Ray Highschool from 1953 to 1955.

Seagrave's collaborator and wife of 35 years was Peggy Sawyer Seagrave, who died about a year before her husband.

Seagrave died on May 1, 2017, in France, where he had been living for more than 30 years with his wife. Seagrave's death was not announced publicly until July 31, 2017.

== Publications ==
Seagrave worked as an investigative journalist in Asia, and he contributed to several major newspapers and magazines. His books include:

- Yellow Rain: A Journey Through the Terror of Chemical Warfare. New York: M. Evans (1981). OCLC 8633707.
- The Soong Dynasty. London: Sidgwick & Jackson (1985). ISBN 978-0283992384.
- The Marcos Dynasty. New York: Harper & Row (1988). ISBN 978-0060158156.
- Dragon Lady: The Life and Legend of the Last Empress of China. New York: Vintage Books (1992). ISBN 0679733698.
- Lords of the Rim. New York: Putnam (1995). ISBN 978-0552140522.
- The Yamato Dynasty: The Secret History of Japan's Imperial Family. New York: Broadway Books (1999). ISBN 978-0767904964.
- Gold Warriors: America's Secret Recovery of Yamashita's Gold, with Peggy Seagrave. New York: Verso (2003). ISBN 978-1859845424.
- Red Sky in the Morning: The Secret History of Two Men Who Got Away - and One Who Didn't, with Peggy Seagrave. Charleston, SC: BookSurge (2008). ISBN 978-1439240472.

=== Critiques ===
Donald G. Gillin, a Sinologist affiliated with Hoover Institution, wrote a book Falsifying China's History: The Case of Sterling Seagrave's The Soong Dynasty, in which he criticised Seagrave's book The Soong Dynasty as being biased against Chiang Kai-shek.

Dragon Lady challenges the notion that the Empress Dowager Cixi used the Boxers in the Boxer Rebellion. Kang Youwei is said to be the source of false stories which stained her reputation. In the book, Cixi is portrayed sympathetically.

In its review of Gold Warriors: America's Secret Recovery of Yamashita's Gold, which dealt with allegations that post World War II the CIA had misappropriated billions of dollars of Japanese war loot (the titular Yamashita's Gold), BBC History Magazine noted that whilst "numerous gaps remain.... this is an important story, with far-reaching implications, that deserves to receive further attention".
