= Tell Me You're Proud of Me =

Live album by Jamie Campbell
- Released: March 10, 2015
- Venue: Wild Goose Creative, in Columbus, Ohio
- Genre: Comedy
- Length: 45:07
- Label: Mint 400

Jamie Campbell chronology
Tell Me You're Proud of Me (2015)	Stocking Stuffer (2015)

Tell Me You're Proud of Me is the debut live album from the American comedian Jamie Campbell.

== About ==
Campbell signed with New Jersey independent record label Mint 400 Records in 2015, and released Tell Me You're Proud of Me, the labels first comedy album, on March 10, 2015. The eleven-track album was recorded live at Wild Goose Creative in Columbus, Ohio, at the Columbus Unscripted Improv Festival. In an interview with New York, Campbell recalls "I did it in Columbus because last spring, I think it was around May, I had met these guys doing Columbus Unscripted [and] when I went out there, the audience was insane. They were so good. It was like you were being spoiled. As soon as I went back to Chicago I was like, "That's the audience that I have to have for the album.""

Tell Me You're Proud of Me focuses on ego, love, family, childhood and adulthood. The album release party was held at ComedySportz Chicago, and featured some of Campbell's favorite Chicago performers. He supported the release of Tell Me You're Proud of Me with a tour across the United States, and the album's success raised his profile.

== Reception ==
Teme Ring in ChicagoNow says "he engages the audience one-on-one, which could have been a risky proposition during his recent live album recording. But he was undaunted and his quick wit and inventive riffing paid off", and Monique Madrid of New York also gave a positive review.

== Track listing ==
No.	Title	Length
1.	"Tell Me You're Proud of Me"	4:06
2.	"Greatest Gift Ever"	2:43
3.	"Cocaine and Time Travel"	5:12
4.	"Black Panther"	2:22
5.	"Swimming in a Sea of Susan"	4:40
6.	"Drunk Notebook"	3:17
7.	"That's a Hero"	3:16
8.	"Dumb Jokes about Sex"	4:26
9.	"Ladies Home Journal"	3:22
10.	"Raquetball Buddies"	5:47
11.	"Handgun at a Party"	5:58
Total length:		45:07
