= United States v. Payner =

- Supreme Court of the United States

Argued February 20, 1980 Decided June 23, 1980
- Full case name: United States v. Jack Payner
- Citations: 447 U.S. 727 (more) 100 S. Ct. 2439; 65 L. Ed. 2d 468; 1980 U.S. LEXIS 136
- Argument: Oral argument

Case history
- Prior: Conviction set aside, 434 F. Supp. 113 (N.D. Ohio 1977); appeal denied, 572 F.2d 144 (6th Cir. 1978); affirmed, 590 F.2d 206 (6th Cir. 1979)
- Subsequent: remanded, 629 F.2d 1181 (6th Cir. 1980)

Holding
- Defendant convicted of tax evasion did not have standing to challenge constitutionality of evidence resulting from unlawful investigative techniques that targeted others; supervisory power of the federal courts does not authorize a court to suppress otherwise admissible evidence on the ground that it was seized unlawfully from a third party not before the court. Sixth Circuit reversed.

Court membership
- Chief Justice Warren E. Burger Associate Justices William J. Brennan Jr. · Potter Stewart; Byron White · Thurgood Marshall; Harry Blackmun · Lewis F. Powell Jr. William Rehnquist · John P. Stevens

Case opinions
- Majority: Powell, joined by Burger, Stewart, White, Rehnquist, Stevens
- Concurrence: Burger
- Dissent: Marshall, joined by Brennan, Blackmun

Laws applied
- U.S. Const. amend. IV

United States v. Payner, 447 U.S. 727 (1980), is a United States Supreme Court case in which the Court reversed a district court's suppression of evidence in the criminal prosecution of an Ohio businessman charged with tax evasion. The case concerned both issues of criminal procedure and the application of the exclusionary rule derived from the Fourth Amendment. By a 6–3 margin the Court both reaffirmed its earlier rulings' holding that only the party whose Fourth Amendment protections may have been violated has standing to challenge the evidence seized in the search, and barred lower courts from exercising their supervisory power to exclude such evidence at the trial of third parties.

The case had been brought as the fruit of Operation Trade Winds, a lengthy Internal Revenue Service (IRS) investigation into the use of offshore accounts in tax havens by American citizens attempting to evade tax liability and hide assets, some of which were believed to have been derived from criminal activities. At one point, a private investigator working with a Florida IRS agent had taken the executive's briefcase for the IRS to open and duplicate the documents within, then returned the briefcase. (This aspect was described by the district judge as the "briefcase caper", a sobriquet which has subsequently become attached to the case as a whole). Subpoenas based on the information in those documents yielded the documents used in a prosecution later of Ohio businessman Jack Payner.

Lewis Powell wrote for the majority that prior case law gave Payner no reasonable expectation of privacy in the documents used to build the case against him. While the Court, too, was outraged by the IRS agent's disregard for the law, the judicial branch's supervisory power was meant to be used only against its own excesses, and Congress was better equipped to remedy such breaches of the Constitution since there were no ways to limit how a court might apply such a rule. Thurgood Marshall's dissent noted not only the extent to which the IRS had gone in planning the briefcase caper but that its agents had purposely been instructed to take advantage of the loophole created by the court's standing rule. Later commentators read the case as expanding the standing rule, and indicating a shift to focusing on the deterrence effect of applying the exclusionary rule instead of the courts' supervisory role.

== Initial investigation ==
In 1965 the IRS initiated "Operation Trade Winds", a broad investigation into the use of offshore tax havens by American citizens, some of whom had links to organized crime. Agents in the Jacksonville office, where the investigation was headquartered, began to focus on Castle Bank & Trust, in Nassau, Bahamas, when they learned a suspected drug trafficker had opened an account there. (Note: In May 1977, Castle Bank & Trust, Mercantile Bank Freeport and another Mercantile Bank in the Cayman Islands failed. George H. Olmsted owned the Mercantile banks. The later two which are part of I. Gordon Mosvold's Mercantile Bank & Trust Co. which is a subsidiary of the International Bank (IB) of Washington, D.C., which is closely associated with Financial General (FG), and the Mosvold family which has the Mosvold Shipping Group of Kristiansand.) Richard Jaffe, one of the special agents involved in Trade Winds, asked Norman Casper, a private investigator he sometimes used as a source, to look into Castle.

Casper made the acquaintance of Michael Wolstencroft, one of Castle's vice presidents. He introduced Wolstencroft to Sybol Kennedy, a former employee of his who also did private investigative work. In 1973 Wolstencroft came to Miami for a few days, and Casper came up with a plan to get information on who Castle's depositors were. Jaffe approved the basic outline.

Upon Wolstencroft's arrival in Miami, he went to Kennedy's apartment and took her out for a dinner date. While they were out, Casper entered the apartment with a key Kennedy had given him and took Wolstencroft's briefcase to Jaffe. A locksmith created a duplicate key to the briefcase. Once it was opened Jaffe and other IRS personnel microfilmed 400 of the documents within. They were replaced and returned to Kennedy's apartment before she and Wolstencroft returned from dinner.

The documents revealed extensive cooperation between Castle and the Bank of Perrine in Florida. Later, at Casper's instruction, Kennedy stole a rolodex from Castle's office in Nassau during a visit to Wolstencroft. Among those with contact information in it was Cleveland-area businessman Jack Payner. The IRS let him know that it was investigating his tax returns for four years. Subpoenas were issued to the Bank of Perrine. In response to one the bank produced a 1972 letter from Payner pledging the $100,000 in his Castle account as collateral for a loan. Since Payner had said he did not have any offshore accounts on his tax return for that year, the case was referred to the United States Attorney for the Northern District of Ohio. Based on that evidence, Payner was indicted in 1976 on a charge of filing a false tax return, a felony.

== Trial ==
A year after the indictment, Payner moved to suppress the government's evidence against him as fruit of the poisonous tree, developed from evidence obtained in violation of the Fourth Amendment's prohibition of unreasonable search and seizure. Federal prosecutors argued in response that the evidence was developed from sources other than the documents in Wolstencroft's briefcase, and that even if those had been the only source Payner had no standing to invoke the exclusionary rule because his rights had not been violated when the documents were copied. (Note: Wolstencroft was also indicted for aiding and abetting Payner, but was never prosecuted because he never returned to the United States (Payner, 447 U.S. at 746 n.13 (Marshall, J., dissenting)).) With the agreement of both parties, Judge John Michael Manos conducted the proceedings as a bench trial, with himself as sole trier of fact, considering both the government's case on the merits and the defendant's motion to suppress concurrently, in order to determine whether or not any of the government's evidence was obtained independently of the contents of Wolstencroft's briefcase or the rolodex.

After both parties had presented their cases, Manos granted the motion to suppress. Prosecutors appealed to the United States Court of Appeals for the Sixth Circuit. A three-judge panel headed by the circuit's chief judge, Harry Phillips, dismissed the appeal for lack of jurisdiction. Phillips wrote that the federal statute limiting the government's right of appeal in criminal prosecutions was explicit that rulings suppressing evidence could only be appealed before trial, not afterwards. He criticized Manos's handling of the case, saying that the motion to suppress should have been heard first in any event, in order to preserve the government's right of appeal.

With the case before him again, Manos amended his rulings accordingly. He first found Payner guilty, then granted the motion to suppress and, on his own initiative, set aside the verdict. In a memorandum opinion on the suppression, he set forth his reasoning.

"This Court finds that the United States, through its agents, Richard Jaffe, and others, knowingly and willfully participated in the unlawful seizure of Michael Wolstencroft's briefcase", Manos declared. He did not accept the government claim that Casper had acted on his own, since Jaffe had been not only involved and aware but had gone so far as to clear the plan with his own superior. The government had also not proved its case that the evidence against Payner was developed independently of the theft of the briefcase. At trial he had not found Jaffe a trustworthy or credible witness. The IRS agent had, in fact, told a congressional committee that the evidence from the briefcase was unavailable from any other source, and the timing of the subpoenas reinforced that claim.

Manos then turned to the legal issues surrounding the exclusionary rule. He cited the three circumstances under which the Supreme Court had said it was to be applied: when defendants' rights had been violated, when the court found the government's conduct outrageous, and as part of the courts' supervisory power over the operations of government, under which "to allow admission of the evidence calls into question the integrity of the entire federal judicial system".

The first instance did not apply. In Alderman v. United States, the first Fourth Amendment case decided by the Supreme Court after it shifted the root of the Amendment's protection from property to privacy in Katz v. United States, the Court had broadened an earlier holding, Goldstein v. United States, into a principle that the exclusionary rule could not be invoked vicariously. It had reaffirmed that holding recently in Rakas v. Illinois. And in United States v. Miller, it had held that there was no reasonable expectation of privacy in banking records.

All the same Manos believed just as strongly that Payner's due process rights had been violated by the unlawful copying of the record's in Wolstencroft's briefcase. Drawing on a line of cases starting with Rochin v. California, where the Court had been so outraged by police officers' forced use of a stomach pump to retrieve two swallowed morphine capsules that they overturned the conviction, and clarified in United States v. Janis when the Court declined to exclude evidence from a civil proceeding that had been seized in a good-faith belief it was permissible, he held that the jurisprudence on the issue:

... requires exclusion of reliable evidence only in those cases in which government officials obtain the challenged materials in a grossly improper fashion, i.e., by engaging in illegal conduct which exhibits their knowing and purposeful bad faith hostility to any person's fundamental constitutional rights ... [S]ociety's interest in deterring [d]ue [p]rocess violations outweighs society's interest in allowing the fact finder to view all relevant evidence only when an official's conduct demonstrates a bad faith hostility to the strictures imposed on him by the Constitution ... The Court finds that the illegal conduct of the government officials involved in this case compels the conclusion that they knowingly and purposefully obtained the briefcase materials with bad faith hostility toward the strictures imposed on their activities by the Constitution. The activities of the [g]overnment agents Jaffe and Casper were outrageous. They plotted, schemed and ultimately acted in contravention of the United States Constitution and laws of Florida, knowing that their conduct was illegal. It is imperative to signal all likeminded individuals that purposeful criminal acts on behalf of the Government will not be tolerated in this country and that such acts shall never be allowed to bear fruit.

For the same reasons, the supervisory power of the courts first outlined in McNabb v. United States required suppression of the evidence.

The government appealed the suppression order again. After hearing arguments late in 1978, another Phillips-chaired panel affirmed Manos early the following year. In a short per curiam opinion, the panel concurred with the district court's findings of fact. It found the suppression a permissible use of the court's supervisory power and declined to consider the constitutional questions.

A petition for rehearing, either by another panel or en banc, was denied in March. The government then petitioned the Supreme Court for certiorari, which was granted later in the year. Oral arguments were heard in February 1980.

== Decision ==
The Court announced its ruling in June 1980, near the end of term. A majority of six justices had agreed with the government and reversed Manos and the appeals court, holding that the evidence was admissible. Lewis F. Powell, Jr., reaffirmed earlier holdings that only the aggrieved party could challenge the constitutionality of evidence, and that even the deliberate, sustained nature of the violation in the instant case did not change that. He also outlined reasons why the Court did not think it wise to extend the exclusionary rule in that direction, since its supervisory power was properly limited to actions of the judicial branch, and Congressional hearings had already exposed the excesses of Operation Trade Winds and led the IRS to shut it down. Chief Justice Warren Burger added a short concurring opinion emphasizing the latter point but also distancing the Court from the conduct of the agents.

Thurgood Marshall wrote for the dissenting justices. He felt that the deliberate and calculated plans of Jaffe and Casper, as well as the former's admission to Congress that he had been made aware of the standing provision during training and encouraged to take advantage of it, required that the Court act. The Court's supervisory power was about protecting the integrity of the judicial process, he reminded the majority.

A later petition for rehearing was denied. The Sixth Circuit remanded the case to the district court for further proceedings in the fall of 1980.

=== Majority opinion ===
After reviewing the facts of the case, Powell found no reason to doubt or add to Manos's conclusion that Payner lacked Fourth Amendment standing. In a footnote, he dismissed an argument in Payner's brief that Bahamian banking secrecy laws gave him an expectation of privacy. None of the stolen documents would have been covered by it, and even if they were the cited section of law was outdated, the current statute was "hardly a blanket guarantee of privacy" since it had limited scope, many exceptions and the brief had cited no authority on how to construe it.

He turned to the legal issues. "We certainly can understand the District Court's commendable desire to deter deliberate intrusions into the privacy of persons who are unlikely to become defendants in a criminal prosecution," he wrote. "No court should condone the unconstitutional and possibly criminal behavior of those who planned and executed this 'briefcase caper.'"

But the Court's many precedents in that area "do not command the exclusion of evidence in every case of illegality. Instead, they must be weighed against the considerable harm that would flow from indiscriminate application of an exclusionary rule." Thus its use was properly restricted to instances where it would most be useful in remedying the violation, wrote Powell. "Our cases have consistently recognized that unbending application of the exclusionary sanction to enforce ideals of governmental rectitude would impede unacceptably the truthfinding functions of judge and jury."

Similarly, Powell wrote, the supervisory power should be carefully used. The Court had said as such in Elkins v. United States nearly two decades before, and demonstrated that restraint most recently in United States v. Caceres "Were we to accept this use of the supervisory power," he concluded, "we would confer on the judiciary discretionary power to disregard the considered limitations of the law it is charged with enforcing." In a footnote, he also pointed out that five years earlier, in 1975, the House Government Operations Committee had held hearings on Trade Winds and other related IRS investigations which had revealed the briefcase caper and other abusive investigatory practices. In response the investigations had been called off.

=== Concurrence ===
"Orderly government under our system of separate powers calls for internal self-restraint and discipline in each [b]ranch," Burger wrote. "[T]his Court has no general supervisory authority over operations of the [e]xecutive [b]ranch, as it has with respect to the federal courts." He emphasized his agreement with the majority, but noted that its opinion "should not be read as condoning the conduct of the IRS 'private investigators' disclosed by this record, or as approval of their evidence-gathering methods."

=== Dissent ===
The majority's holding, Marshall wrote, "effectively turns the standing rules created by this Court for assertions of Fourth Amendment violations into a sword to be used by the Government to permit it deliberately to invade one person's Fourth Amendment rights in order to obtain evidence against another person." Courts should, he said, be allowed to prevent that.

He reviewed the facts of the case as Manos had outlined them, believing fuller detail was necessary to appreciate the extent to which the IRS agents had been involved in planning and executing the briefcase caper. He reiterated that they had been fully aware of the standing rule when they planned the investigation. "It is in the context of these findings", he wrote, "that the suppression issue must be considered."

In support of the use of supervisory powers to suppress, he cited Louis Brandeis's famous dissent in Olmstead v. United States: "If the Government becomes a lawbreaker, it breeds contempt for law; it invites every man to become a law unto himself; it invites anarchy." He distinguished the cases where the Court had exercised its powers and suppressed evidenced obtained unconstitutionally as those cases where, like the instant one, the seizure of the evidence had come about through deliberate violation of law. "If the federal court permits such evidence, the intended product of deliberately illegal Government action, to be used to obtain a conviction, it places its imprimatur upon such lawlessness, and thereby taints its own integrity."

Since the purpose of the supervisory power was to allow the courts to protect their own integrity, Marshall continued, he was all the more puzzled by the majority's focus on the Fourth Amendment's standing provisions. "The only way the IRS can benefit from the evidence it chose to obtain illegally is if the evidence is admitted at trial against persons such as Payner; that was the very point of the criminal exercise in the first place", he wrote. "Such a pollution of the federal courts should not be permitted."

He attacked the notion that the courts were improperly intruding on the prerogatives of the executive branch:

This is simply not a case in which a federal court has attempted to exercise "general supervisory authority over operations of the Executive Branch" ... Rather, this is a case where the District Court refused to be made an accomplice to illegal conduct by the IRS by permitting the agency to use the proceeds of its crimes for the very purpose for which they were committed—to convict persons such as Payner.

Lastly, to respond to charges that this was potentially an indiscriminate application of the exclusionary rule, he quoted from one of Powell's own opinions, in Hampton v. United States to the effect that at some point a case where the Court would have to take a stand against abusive investigative methods. "That appropriate case has arrived, and the Court should prevent the Government from profiting by use in the federal courts of evidence deliberately obtained by illegal actions taken in bad faith hostility to constitutional rights."

== Subsequent jurisprudence ==
No later holdings modified Payner, but it has been among the cases that have guided the Court in other tests of the supervisory power and the exclusionary rule. Several years later, when the Court created the good-faith exception to the exclusionary rule in United States v. Leon, Byron White's majority opinion quoted Powell's criticism of the inflexible application of the rule in support of allowing good-faith exceptions. The next year, Thomas would himself cite Powell as to how the supervisory power could not be exercised in conflict with existing statutory or constitutional provisions in Thomas v. Arn, upholding a Sixth Circuit rule that required parties appealing a district court judgement to have filed timely written objections to a magistrate's report.

During those years, two appellate courts would rely on Payner in reaching opposite conclusions about when to allow the use of the supervisory power. A few months after it was handed down, the Seventh Circuit upheld a district court's suppression of evidence during the prosecution of a Chicago gambling ring in United States v. Cortina. An evidentiary hearing found that FBI agent William Brown had greatly exaggerated much of the information used to prepare an affidavit used to obtain the search warrant that had uncovered most of the evidence.

Judge William J. Bauer discussed Payner at length in his opinion. He found that the instant case fell within the scope of the supervisory power as delineated by Powell's opinion, since it was evidence seized from the defendants themselves. The government had argued, however, that none of them had suffered a violation of their privacy expectations and therefore the supervisory power could not be invoked. But Payner "did not hold that defendants must establish a legitimate expectation of privacy to invoke the supervisory powers if it is proven that the challenged evidence was seized from defendants", Bauer wrote, and had explicitly rejected a notion that it was identical with the Fourth Amendment. "We recognize that the supervisory power is a complement to, not a substitute for, the Fourth Amendment."

Bauer felt it was even more important to deter illegal conduct in this case since it "was committed within the sanctity of the court itself". He noted that it was very difficult to uncover falsification in search warrant affidavits, and that it had only been the good faith and cooperation of the federal prosecutors that had made it possible to do so in the instant case. In that vein, he also felt that enough damage had been done to the judicial process by that falsification to outweigh any harm that might be done by excluding the evidence. He concluded:

Unless we deter behavior such as Brown's, [the warrant requirement] will become a Maginot Line, laughingly circumvented by those sworn to respect it. Courts must act in their own self-defense against brazen violations of their procedures. We must draw the line at misconduct occurring within our own house ... Exclusion is based firmly on an exercise of our supervisory power endorsed in Payner.

In 1984 District of Columbia Circuit judge Antonin Scalia, later elevated to the Supreme Court himself, would also rely on Payner to allow some contested evidence. In United States v. Byers, the appellee sought the exclusion, on several grounds, of evidence from a psychiatric interview used to convict him of murder. Scalia found Powell's point that the balance between the deterrent value and social harm of excluding the evidence does not change whether they are considered against the supervisory power or the exclusionary rule "relevant" in holding the evidence admissible.

== Analysis and commentary ==
Kevin Michael Carome has argued that Payner gave insufficient consideration to judicial integrity in allowing the tainted evidence. "Even where the defendants' rights are not violated," he wrote in a Boston College Law Review article, "courts should be permitted to rely on the supervisory power to exclude evidence seized by grossly improper means". He believed the evidence could have been suppressed even under a more limited exclusionary rule.

Prior to Payner, there had been arguments that the supervisory power should be thought of only as the judicial branch's self-policing ability. But, Carome argued, from the time the Court first invoked it in McNabb, "it has been used to counteract improprieties of the executive branch that do not amount to constitutional violations." Courts have also recognized that Congress can limit its application, and have used it sparingly, limiting the power's potential to upset the balance of powers. It also was not intrusive, checking the actions of the executive branch only insofar as it reached criminal prosecutions.

Thus the exercise of the supervisory power is a refusal of the courts to participate in the illegalities of the executive branch in an effort to preserve their own integrity. It is not an attempt by the courts to dictate policy to the executive branch.

In Payner, the government's brief had also suggested Federal Rule of Evidence 402 barred the exercise of the supervisory power, since it holds that only statutory or constitutional provisions may be used to justify suppressing evidence. Powell did not even mention it in his majority opinion. Carome speculated that while the Court may not want to expand the supervisory power, it does not want to surrender it either.

He further argued that the supervisory power could, unlike the exclusionary rule, be applied on behalf of defendants whose rights had not been violated personally. "Because the supervisory power is non-constitutional in nature," he wrote, "federal courts may utilize it to create standards that exceed minimum constitutional levels. Hence, the power need not be doctrinally confined to the vindication of personal rights ... [T]he supervisory power enables federal courts, in proper circumstances, to shift the focus from the rights of particular litigants and place it upon governmental conduct or institutions threatening the courts' integrity."

Carome pointed to cases where this had been done. In Thiel v. Southern Pacific Corp., and Ballard v. United States, the Court had overturned a civil verdict and criminal convictions respectively where certain categories had been unlawfully excluded from the jury pool—without requiring parties to demonstrate they were prejudiced by the exclusions, since they had done enough damage to the judicial system. More recently, a Sixth Circuit case had excluded evidence obtained by a government informant who violated attorney–client privilege, conduct he called "more outrageous than Payner" from trials of several defendants. Based on those cases, Carome said,

... it is submitted that evidence may be properly suppressed to benefit a third person in cases of grossly improper government misconduct, and that the district court in Payner was correct in suppressing the evidence so obtained by the illegal search of Wolstencroft's briefcase. The admission of this evidence due to the ultimate reversal by the Supreme Court poses questions about the Court's desire to sustain the integrity of the administration of justice in the federal courts.

Cortina showed that courts nevertheless felt there was a need for the power, and Carome proposed that the cases where it had initially been exercised called for the creation of a standard. He suggested it be used:

... when the defendant can show a preconceived plan to conduct a search which knowingly and wilfully violates the constitutional or statutory rights of others and which is intended primarily to gather evidence, or information likely to produce evidence, for use against the defendant, or a class of persons in which the defendant is a member. This plan must be pre-arranged and approved prior to the point in time at which the sequence of events directly culminating in the illegal conduct began to occur. Further, the government agents executing the plan must act in bad faith, fully cognizant that their conduct is illegal. A major purpose of the search must be to obtain evidence against someone other than the person whose own rights are violated by the search. The defendant must be a member of a recognizable group against which the government sought the information. This use of the supervisory power would be limited to cases in the federal courts.

Having standards would allay the Court's concerns, and send clear signals to law enforcement as to what conduct would not be tolerated. He called on the Court to re-evaluate Payner at some point in the future. "The Court's failure to so act would allow such abuses to continue to taint the integrity of [the] courts," he said. "A nation pledged to obey the rule of law cannot ignore such threats to its basic order."

A later commentator, Ohio State law professor Sharon Davies, also found Payner's narrow approach to the issue troubling. She looked at it through the lens of law and economics, particularly the work of Robert Cooter on prices and sanctions. Both could be applied to undesirable conduct, but the former permits it by requiring a party to personally bear costs that would otherwise be borne by others, whereas the latter is meant to discourage undesirable conduct as strongly as possible by imposing a high price.

Had the Court, she asked, considered violations of the Fourth Amendment an unconscionable wrong to be deterred with sanctions or a sometimes necessary evil that could be minimized with a price? The language various Supreme Court majorities had used in describing the infractions suggested, to her, the former. At the time of Mapp v. Ohio, when the exclusionary rule was applied to proceedings in state courts, its imposition was defended as much for its role in protecting judicial integrity as well as deterring unconstitutional investigative practices. "[E]vidence collected in violation of Fourth Amendment limits", Davies recounts, "was so imbued with the potential to smear that even judicial robes normally infused with an aura of impartiality and fairness would be tarnished by it."

As the Court shifted over time to deterrence as the sole basis for the exclusionary rule, requiring a balancing test that is essentially a cost-benefit analysis, Davies argues that more and more exceptions to it have been created that another observer has described as "inclusionary rules." She found Payner to be "[a]n example of government officials engaged in precisely this type of overt cost-benefit analysis ... If, as in Payner, police are truly free to choose whether to abide by or violate the constitutional requirements, the penalty for the decision to inflict the constitutional harm begins to look less and less like a sanction for wrongful conduct." She did not find the scope of the violation surprising either, since "when viewed from the perspective of a self-interested actor, these developments make perfect economic sense, for '[o]nce it pays to fall short of the legal standard, it pays to fall significantly short of it.'"

== See also ==
- Nilon Limited v Royal Westminster Investments S.A.: a similar British case
- List of United States Supreme Court cases, volume 447
