= International Thespian Society =

Honor society for high and middle school theatre students

- ITS
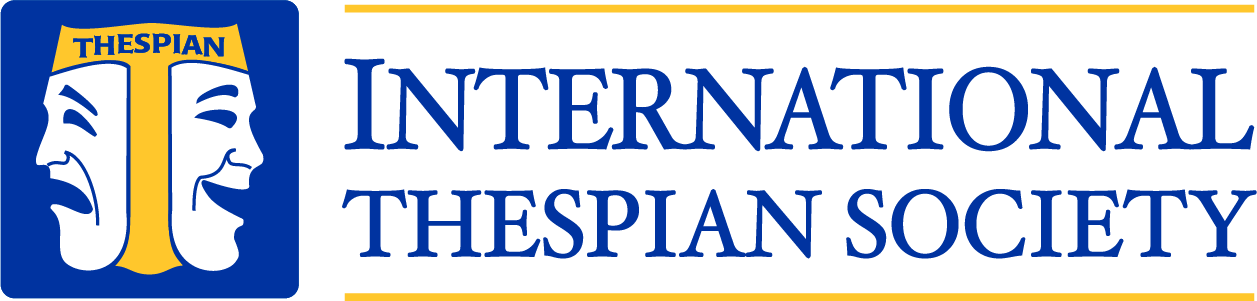
- Founded: 1929; 97 years ago Fairmont, West Virginia, US
- Type: Honor
- Affiliation: Educational Theatre Association
- Status: Active
- Emphasis: Dramatic Arts
- Scope: International
- Colors: Blue and Yellow
- Chapters: 48 active (5,000+ chartered)
- Members: 139,000 active
- Headquarters: 4555 Lake Forest Drive, Suite 650; Cincinnati, Ohio 45242; United States
- Website: schooltheatre.org/international-thespian-society/

The International Thespian Society (ITS) is an honor society for high school and middle school theatre students. It is a division of the Educational Theatre Association. Thespian troupes serve students in grades 9 through 12; Junior Thespian troupes serve students in grades 6 through 8. It was established in 1929 in Fairmont, West Virginia, as the National Thespians, with its first troop or chapter being established at the Natrona County High School in Casper, Wyoming.

== History ==
The International Thespian Society was founded in 1929 in Fairmont, West Virginia. Originally named National Thespians, the society was founded by Dr. Paul Opp, Earnest Bavely, and Harry T. Leeper. National Thespians was an honorary organization for high school theater students who earned membership through participation in their schools' theatre programs. The organization consisted of troupes, each linked to a school. The first troupe was formed by Dr. Earl Blank at Natrona County High School in Casper, Wyoming.

At the end of the 1928–1929 school year, there were 71 troupes across 26 states. In October 1929, the first issue of The High School Thespian, "official organ of National Thespians", was published. The National Thespian headquarters was moved to Cincinnati during the year 1935. That same year, the society was renamed the National Thespian Dramatic Honor Society. The society held its first National High School Drama Conference and Play Production Festival in 1941 at Indiana University, which later became a bi-annual event. The High School Thespian became Dramatics magazine in 1944.

In October 1945, the National Thespian Dramatic Honor Society was again renamed the National Thespian Society. As the Thespian Society reached its 25th anniversary in 1954, 1,432 Thespian troupes existed across forty-eight states and the then-territories of Alaska, Hawaii, and the Canal Zone, as well as Canada and Japan. In 1969, the organization's name was changed to the title it still holds today: The International Thespian Society. June 1982 marked a name change for the National High School Drama Conference and Play Production Festival, turning it into the Thespian Festival, as it is still called today. The Thespian Festival also began an annual schedule for the first time.

The Society offered its first set of summertime retreats for high school theatre directors in 1986, an activity that eventually grew into a professional association called the Theatre Education Association. In 1989, the ITS board established the Educational Theatre Association (EdTA), meant to oversee both the Thespian Society and the Theatre Education Association, and launched Teaching Theatre, a quarterly journal for theatre educators. The Theatre Education Association was eventually absorbed into the EdTA, and its title is no longer used.

In 1990, the Junior Thespians branch of ITS was set up, extending the reach of the society to middle school theatre students. The EdTA helped to write the theatre section of the National Standards for Arts Education, the first set of guidelines for the arts education field, in 1994. By 2012, International Thespian Society had formed a bond with the charity organization Broadway Cares/Equity Fights AIDS and raised more than $1 million for it. In 2015, the EdTA launched JumpStart Theatre, which brings sustainable musical theatre programs to underserved middle schools where there currently are none, and an ITS branch in China was started.

== Membership ==
The International Thespian Society allows for the induction of high school and middle school students attending ITS affiliated schools, based on the quality and quantity of work in all realms of theatre. Points can be earned from participation in productions (either on stage or backstage), Thespian Festivals, seeing other theatre's productions, and holding an officer position in a Thespian troupe. It is generally understood that a minimum of 10 thespian points (equal to 100+ hours of work in scholastic theatre) grants a student membership to the affiliated troupe. Middle school thespians may transfer a maximum of 5 points towards earning membership in their high school’s troupe.

Induction ceremonies vary from troupe to troupe, but most are run by the troupe's officers and director. They include, at the very least, a brief summation of the Society's history, followed by a listing of the names and achievements of each new inductee, and then a recitation of the Society's pledge by all new and existing members. The pledge is as follows:

"I promise to uphold the aims and ideals of the International Thespian Society. I am a student of theatre and excellence is my ideal. I promise to perform my part as well as I can; to accept praise and criticism with grace; to cooperate with my fellow thespians and work for the good of the troupe; and to share my love of theatre."

After induction, members can continue to earn points in order to move up through the International Thespian Society ranking system. Ranks include Honor Thespian (60 points), National Honor Thespian (120 points), and International Honor Thespian (180+ points). Additionally, graduating active thespians may wear Thespian regalia such as Honor Thespian medals, stoles, and cords.

== Governance ==
At the troupe and junior troupe level, there are various offices offered, including, but not limited to, President, Vice President, Treasurer, Secretary, and Historian. There are also state, provincial, and international student leaders elected annually by their respective student bodies, and in many chapters, adorned with blue or yellow officer sashes.

The International Thespian Officers (ITOs) were student members elected to represent the student membership. They suggested policy and service changes to the Educational Theatre Association Board, and took an active role in training, chapter conferences, and the annual International Thespian Festival. The International Thespian Officer program ended with the ITO Class of 2024.

State Thespian Officers (STOs) and Junior State Thespian Officers (JSTOs) are elected to manage such events as State Thespian Festivals and local Junior Thespian Festivals, respectively. These student leaders advocate for arts education, fundraise for their chapter, and collaborate with state and national charity organizations, such as Broadway Cares/Equity Fights AIDS.

== Activities ==
Thespian Festivals are held annually at the state and national levels. Each June, the organization holds the International Thespian Festival. For 25 years it was held at the University of Nebraska-Lincoln. As of 2019 it is being held at Indiana University-Bloomington where the first ITF was held in 1941.

== Chapters ==
Chapters are created in order to support the mission of the International Thespian Society. They are led by a chapter director who is supported and assisted by a chapter board. As of 2024, there are 48 active chapters:

Chapters are located in Maine, Massachusetts, Rhode Island, Connecticut, New York, Pennsylvania, New Jersey, Maryland, Virginia, West Virginia, Ohio, North Carolina, South Carolina, Kentucky, Tennessee, Georgia, Alabama, Mississippi, Florida, Delaware, Louisiana, Arkansas, Missouri, Illinois, Indiana, Michigan, Wisconsin, Iowa, Minnesota, Nebraska, Kansas, Oklahoma, Texas, Montana, Wyoming, Colorado, New Mexico, Arizona, Idaho, Washington, Oregon, Nevada, California, Hawaii, the Western Pacific Islands, British Columbia, and China.

== Notable members ==
A few famous ITS alumni include Tom Hanks, Val Kilmer, James Marsters, Julia Louis-Dreyfus, and Stephen Schwartz.
