= The Secret Theatre =

The Secret Theatre is an Off-Off-Broadway theater that was first established in The Long Island City Art Center (Queens, NY) in July 2007 by actor/director Richard Mazda. The theater seats just under 50 audience members. The theater is home to The Queens Players and has repertory-style policy of mounting an average of more than 9 mainstage productions in a year.

The inaugural production featured an original work by Joel Schatzky that starred Bill Krakauer, father of Klezmer musician David Krakauer. Bill was an 80-year-old psychotherapist turned actor who played the lead role as a conductor who escaped persecution by the Nazis by emigrating to America to pursue a musical career. Subsequent productions in The Secret Theatre's first season included Theatre of Horror, a mainstage production featuring original plays from the Grand Guignol, A Christmas Carol, Lysistrata, and Edward II by Christopher Marlowe.

The production of Edward II was filmed and went into post production.
