= International Thespian Festival =

The International Thespian Festival is an annual week-long theatre festival in Midwestern United States organized by the International Thespian Society that brings together U.S. high school theatre clubs, thespian troupes, and programs.

== Location ==
Organized by the International Thespian Society, it was held annually in late June on the campus of the University of Nebraska–Lincoln in Lincoln, Nebraska until 2020. In 2022, its first in-person year after the COVID-19 pandemic, the International Thespian Festival was held at Indiana University in Bloomington, Indiana. The festival was held at Indiana University in 2023 and will be held at the same location in 2024–2026.

== Festival ==
There are over 120 workshops offered during the festival, including such titles as "Creating Believable Stage Villains", "Period Hatmaking", and "Fun with Dialects." These workshops are taught by high school teachers, college professors and theater professionals.

There are also auditions for national cast productions, usually to premiere the school edition of two well-known Broadway shows. In 2008, the chosen casts and crews put on productions of "Hairspray" and "Sweeney Todd".

The festival features an event called the Thespy Showcase, formerly known as the Individual Events (IE) Showcase. Following a series of performances and judging periods at the local and chapter level, winning students compete for the chance to perform in the categories of monologue, duet acting, solo/duet/group musical theatre, and mime, or show off their skills in the technical categories of costume design and construction, publicity design, scenic design, stage management, lighting design, and short film.
