= National Intelligence Board =

The National Intelligence Board (NIB), formerly the National Foreign Intelligence Board and before that the United States Intelligence Board is a body of senior U.S. Intelligence Community leaders currently led by the director of national intelligence (DNI). The Board is tasked with reviewing and approving National Intelligence Estimates (NIEs).

== United States Intelligence Board ==
The first incarnation of the Board was the United States Intelligence Board, a forum of intelligence agency leaders convened to advise the director of central intelligence on intelligence matters established by President Dwight D. Eisenhower in 1957 upon the recommendation of the Presidential Board of Consultants on Foreign Intelligence Activities (now the President's Intelligence Advisory Board).

== National Foreign Intelligence Board ==
A quotation from a 1999 report entitled A Consumer's Guide to Intelligence, published by the Office of Public Affairs in the CIA describes the NFIB as:

"the senior Intelligence Community advisory body to the DCI on the substantive aspects of national intelligence. This Board advises the DCI on production, review, and coordination of national foreign intelligence; interagency exchanges of foreign intelligence information; arrangements with foreign governments on intelligence matters; the protection of intelligence sources and methods; activities of common concern; and such other matters as are referred to it by the DCI. It is composed of the DCI (Chairman) and other appropriate officers of the Central Intelligence Agency, Department of State, Department of Defense, the Defense Intelligence Agency, and the National Security Agency. Representatives of other agencies, including the Department of the Treasury, the Department of Energy, the National Reconnaissance Office, the National Imagery and Mapping Agency, and the Federal Bureau of Investigation participate as necessary."

== National Intelligence Board ==
Both the NFIB and NIB are chaired by the directorial head of the Intelligence Community (IC); however, the dominance of the Central Intelligence Agency and director of central intelligence as IC heads ended with the 2004 establishment of the position of Director of National Intelligence (DNI) and Office of the DNI as head, overseer, and coordinator of the IC (and FBI) in accordance with recommendations from the 9/11 Commission. The CIA remained prominent in foreign intelligence, especially foreign human intelligence (HUMINT).

The NIB is supported by ODNI's National Intelligence Council (NIC), which also acts as its Executive Secretariat.

=== Membership ===
An Intelligence Community Directive (ICD 202) effective July 16, 2007 lists the following as members of the National Intelligence Board:

- Director of National Intelligence (DNI), Chair
- Principal Deputy DNI (PDDNI), Vice Chair
- Deputy DNI for Analysis/Chair of the National Intelligence Council (NIC) (the current NIC chair is DNI Avril Haines)
- Deputy DNI for Collection
- Director of the Central Intelligence Agency
- Director of the Defense Intelligence Agency
- Director of the National Geospatial-Intelligence Agency
- Director of the National Security Agency (triple-hatted as Central Security Service Chief and US CYBERCOM Commander)
- Assistant Secretary of State for Intelligence and Research (head of Bureau of Intelligence and Research)
- Executive Assistant Director of the Federal Bureau of Investigation for the National Security Branch
- Assistant Secretary of the Treasury for Intelligence and Analysis (Treasury Office of Intelligence and Analysis)
- Assistant Secretary of Homeland Security for Intelligence and Analysis (DHS Office of Intelligence and Analysis)
- Director of the Office of Intelligence and Counterintelligence (OICI, part of Energy Department)
- National Counterintelligence Executive (position no longer exists, folded into National Counterintelligence and Security Center)
- Under Secretary of Defense for Intelligence (since renamed to Under Secretary of Defense for Intelligence and Security)

NIB members represent the members of the Intelligence Community and are their agencies' heads. If the DNI/Chair of the NIB is absent, they are replaced by the PDDNI/Vice Chair; if both are absent, the NIB is chaired by the DNI's chosen representative.

In addition, if the NIB discusses a topic relevant to the portfolios of the below officials, they or their chosen representatives may attend:

- Deputy DNI for Policy, Plans, and Requirements (position altered; see Deputy Directors of National Intelligence)
- Other ODNI element representatives invited by the Chair
- Assistant Commandant of the Coast Guard for Intelligence and Criminal Investigations
- Chief of the DEA Office of National Security Intelligence
- Director of the National Counterterrorism Center (NCTC)
- Director of the National Counterproliferation Center (NCPC)
- Vice Chair of the National Intelligence Council (NIC)
- (Military) Service Intelligence Chiefs
- Chiefs of Service Intelligence Centers
- DNI Open Source Center Director
- IC element representatives selected by the NIB Chair

Lastly, the following may attend NIB meetings as observers:

- NIC Director of Analysis and Production
- Principal Drafter of the National Intelligence Estimate (NIE) or other NIE drafting team members
- Appropriate DNI-chosen representatives

== See also ==
- Military Intelligence Board, military/Defense Department-specific counterpart
- President's Intelligence Advisory Board
