= Thomas Fingar =

American academic and civil servant

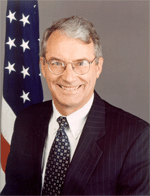

Chair of the National Intelligence Council
- In office June 13, 2005 – December 1, 2008
- President: George W. Bush
- Preceded by: Robert Hutchings
- Succeeded by: Peter Lavoy

16th Assistant Secretary of State for Intelligence and Research
- In office July 22, 2004 – June 13, 2005
- President: George W. Bush
- Preceded by: Carl W. Ford Jr.
- Succeeded by: Randall M. Fort

Personal details
- Born: January 11, 1946 (age 80)
- Education: Cornell University (BA); Stanford University (MA, PhD)

Charles Thomas Fingar (born January 11, 1946) is a professor at Stanford University. In 1986 Fingar left Stanford to join the State Department. In 2005, he moved to the Office of the Director of National Intelligence as the deputy director of National Intelligence for Analysis and concurrently served as the chairman of the National Intelligence Council until December 2008. In January 2009, he rejoined Stanford as a Payne Distinguished Lecturer in the Freeman Spogli Institute for International Studies.

== Education ==
Fingar received his B.A. in government and history from Cornell University (1968), and his M.A. (1969) and Ph.D. (1977) in political science from Stanford University. His principal languages are Chinese and German.

== Career ==
Fingar's academic career has been primarily at Stanford University, where several research appointments included Senior Research Associate in the Center for International Security and Arms Control (CISAC), and Director of the Stanford U.S.-China Relations Program.

He served as Assistant Secretary and head of the Bureau of Intelligence and Research (INR) for the United States Department of State from 23 July 2004 until May 2005. He is a career member of the Senior Executive Service. His principal foreign languages are Chinese and German. Fingar has published dozens of books and articles, mostly on aspects of Chinese politics and policymaking.

As Assistant Secretary in charge of INR, as well as Acting Assistant Secretary (2000–2001 and 2003–2004), he served as principal adviser to the Secretary on intelligence-related issues, supervised analytical work on every country and region as well as transnational challenges such as terrorism and proliferation, ensured that activities undertaken by the Intelligence Community supported the President's foreign policy, and contributed to coordinated intelligence judgments as a member of the National Foreign Intelligence Board (NFIB).

Previous assignments in the department include serving as Principal Deputy Assistant Secretary (2001–2003), Deputy Assistant Secretary for Analysis (1994–2000), Director of the Office of Analysis for East Asia and the Pacific (1989–1994), and Chief of the China Division (1986–1989). Fingar was a member of the Senior Seminar during 1992–1993.

In 1975, Fingar began work at Stanford University as a research associate in the Stanford Arms Control Program, the predecessor of the Center for International Security and Cooperation (CISAC). He was director of the university's U.S.-China Relations Program when he left for the State Department in 1986. Other previous positions include assignment to the United States National Academy of Sciences as co-director of the US-China Education Clearinghouse, adviser to the Congressional Office of Technology Assessment, and consultant to numerous U.S. government agencies and private sector organizations. He served as the senior German linguist in the Office of the Deputy Chief of Staff for Intelligence, USAREUR and 7th Army in Heidelberg, Germany.

In December 2007, Fingar was one of the authors of a National Intelligence Estimate on Iran's nuclear programs. The NIE asserted with "high confidence" that Tehran had "halted its nuclear weapons program" in the fall of 2003. This contradicted an earlier 2005 NIE report that ballistic delivery systems and uranium enrichment was continuing The 2007 NIE was met with some public outcry as some alleged the Bush administration had manipulated intelligence for political aims. A recent announcement by Iran on the existence of the Qom uranium enrichment site—too small for civilian purposes but ideal for producing weapons-grade uranium—was confirmed by the White House, as the U.S. has been "carefully observing and analyzing this facility for several years" although they did not know what the site was being used for until the announcement. The White House statement goes against the report Fingar helped write; namely that Iran had stopped its program when at the same time the US knew of a second, secret site for enrichment. In addition, Britain, Germany and Israel disagreed with the 2007 NIE assessment. The Bundesnachrichtendienst (BND), Germany's foreign intelligence agency, has amassed evidence of a sophisticated Iranian nuclear weapons program that continued beyond 2003.

In October 2020, Fingar signed a letter stating the Biden laptop story “has the classic earmarks of a Russian information operation".

He currently serves on the board of directors of the National Committee on United States-China Relations.

== Honors and awards ==
The US Office of Personnel Management (OPM) awarded Fingar the 2005 Presidential Rank Award for Distinguished Senior Professional. The commendation reads:

Dr. Thomas Fingar is recognized for his outstanding service and leadership in the State Department's Bureau of Intelligence and Research (INR), most recently serving as INR's Assistant Secretary. Fingar guided INR through more than a decade of continuous change, reinvention, and rejuvenation in response to shifting foreign policy challenges. Major INR initiatives under Tom Fingar's leadership included the creation of the Humanitarian Information Unit to cope with such humanitarian emergencies as HIV/AIDS, reconstruction in Afghanistan and Iraq, and tsunami relief; the transformation of INR's TIPOFF terrorism database into a major resource for national watch listing organizations after 9/11; and shifting INR's focus from "current intelligence" toward an optimal balance between briefing policy makers on fast moving issues and providing new insight through more in depth analytical products. Tom Fingar's accessible management style and willingness to adopt inventive technologies and a "team" approach greatly enhanced the output of the Bureau and elevated the morale of its staff. Imbued with what former Secretary of State Colin Powell once termed Tom Fingar's "moral courage and sense of purpose," INR has become an "outstanding intelligence outfit," with a reputation that continues to represent integrity, experience, and respected analytic judgments.

Fingar was awarded the 2012 Samuel Adams Award for integrity in Intelligence.

Fingar oversaw preparation of the landmark 2007 National Intelligence Estimate (NIE) on Iran, in which all 16 U.S. intelligence agencies concluded with "high confidence" that Iran had halted its nuclear weapon design and weaponization work in 2003. The Estimate's key judgments were declassified and made public, and have been revalidated every year since.

Those pressing for an attack on Iran in 2008 found themselves fighting uphill. This time, thanks largely to Fingar and the professional intelligence analysts he led in 2007, intelligence analysis on Iran was fearlessly honest. A consummate intelligence professional, Fingar would not allow the NIE to be "fixed around the policy," the damning phrase used in the famous "Downing St. Memo" of July 23, 2002 to describe the unconscionable process that served up fraudulent intelligence to "justify" war with Iraq."

== Selected works ==
- Speech at The DNI's Information Sharing Conference and Technology Exposition
- Before the Senate Select Committee on Intelligence February 7, 2001

Political offices
Preceded by Carl W. Ford Jr.	Assistant Secretary of State for Intelligence and Research; 2004–2005	Succeeded by Randall M. Fort
Government offices
Preceded by Robert Hutchings	Chair of the National Intelligence Council; 2005–2008	Succeeded by Peter Lavoy
