= Hugh Montgomery (diplomat) =

American diplomat

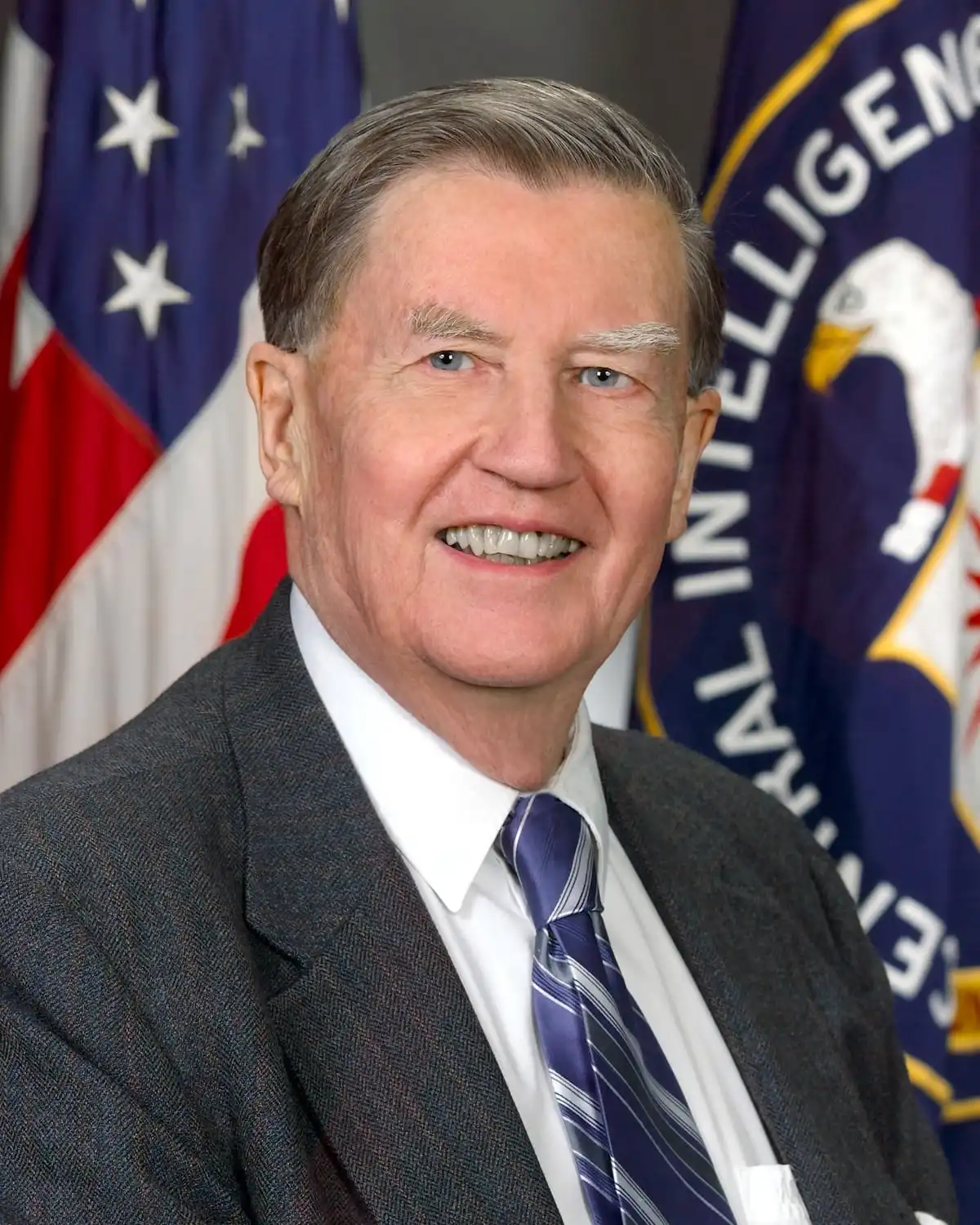

9th Director of the Bureau of Intelligence and Research
- In office October 19, 1981 – January 6, 1985
- Preceded by: Ronald I. Spiers
- Succeeded by: Morton I. Abramowitz

Deputy United States Ambassador to the United Nations
- In office 1985–1989

Special Assistant for Foreign Intelligence Relationships
- In office December 1991 – Position disestablished

Personal details
- Born: November 29, 1923 Springfield, Massachusetts
- Died: April 6, 2017 (aged 93)
- Education: Harvard University (BA, MA, PhD)

Military service
- Branch/service: Office of Strategic Services
- Battles/wars: World War II; Cold War

Hugh Montgomery (November 29, 1923 – April 6, 2017) was a United States diplomat and intelligence officer. He served for 63 years with the Central Intelligence Agency and has been called one of the CIA's founding fathers.

== Biography ==
Hugh Montgomery was born in Springfield, Massachusetts on November 29, 1923. He was educated at Harvard University, receiving a B.A. in 1947, an M.A. in 1948, and a Ph.D. in 1952.

Montgomery was wounded while serving as a paratrooper in World War II and joined the Office of Strategic Services (OSS) counterintelligence branch, known as X-2. Montgomery joined the CIA in 1953 and served in many CIA positions over a career that spanned six decades. During the Cold War, Montgomery served in Athens, Rome, Paris and Vienna. During a CIA assignment in Berlin, he helped tap Soviet communications lines running under the city. In Moscow, he ran one of the most famous and productive CIA assets in history, the Soviet officer Oleg Penkovsky.

Montgomery temporarily left the CIA in 1981 when President of the United States Ronald Reagan nominated him as Director of the Bureau of Intelligence and Research (INR), the successor to the OSS research and analysis branch in the United States Department of State, an office he held from October 19, 1981 until January 6, 1985. From 1985–1989 he served as a deputy U.S. ambassador to the United Nations. He returned to the CIA after this assignment and served with the Agency until he retired in 2014.

Montgomery received the William J. Donovan Award from the OSS Society for his service to his country in 2015.

Montgomery received an honorary doctorate from the Institute of World Politics in Washington, DC in 2010.

Government offices
Preceded by Ronald I. Spiers	Director of the Bureau of Intelligence and Research; October 19, 1981 – January 6, 1985	Succeeded by Morton I. Abramowitz
