= Phyllis E. Oakley =

American diplomat (1934–2022)

13th Assistant Secretary of State for Intelligence and Research
- In office November 10, 1997 – August 2, 1999
- Preceded by: Toby T. Gati
- Succeeded by: J. Stapleton Roy

8th Assistant Secretary of State for Population, Refugees, and Migration
- In office September 21, 1994 – November 7, 1997
- Preceded by: Warren Zimmermann
- Succeeded by: Julia V. Taft

Personal details
- Born: November 23, 1934 Omaha, Nebraska, U.S.
- Died: January 22, 2022 (aged 87) Washington, D.C., U.S.
- Spouse: Robert
- Education: Tufts University

Phyllis Elliott Oakley (November 23, 1934 – January 22, 2022) was an American diplomat who served as U.S. Assistant Secretary of State for Population, Refugees, and Migration (1994–1997) and Assistant Secretary of State for Intelligence and Research (1997–1999). She was married to former Ambassador Robert B. Oakley and was a member of the American Academy of Diplomacy and the Council on Foreign Relations. Oakley was a graduate of The Fletcher School of Law and Diplomacy, at Tufts University.

Ms. Oakley held a variety of positions within the U.S. foreign service. She was a Staff Assistant to Under Secretary Philip Habib, an Afghanistan Desk Officer and a Cultural Affairs Officer in Kinshasa (on loan to the United States Information Agency, USIA). She worked with the Agency for International Development (AID) Afghanistan's cross-border humanitarian assistance program in Pakistan and served in Congressional Affairs for the Near Eastern Bureau of the State Department.

She was an adjunct professor at the Johns Hopkins’ School of Advanced International Studies, Phyllis Oakley was teaching a course on functional issues in American foreign policy. She has also been a visiting professor at Mount Holyoke College and Northwestern University and served on the visiting board of the College of Arts and Sciences of Northwestern University and the advisory board for the Study of Diplomacy at Georgetown University. She was chair of the board at Americans for UNFPA (United Nations Population Fund) from 2003 to 2007 while also serving as chair of the Public Affairs Committee and Nominating Committee at Americans for UNFPA.

Oakley was born in Omaha, Nebraska. She died of a heart attack at a hospital in Washington, D.C., on January 22, 2022, at the age of 87.

Government offices
Preceded by Warren Zimmermann	Assistant Secretary of State for Population, Refugees, and Migration; September 21, 1994 – November 7, 1997	Succeeded by Julia V. Taft
Preceded by Toby T. Gati	Assistant Secretary of State for Intelligence and Research; November 10, 1997 – August 2, 1999	Succeeded by J. Stapleton Roy
