= OICI =

OICI may refer to:

- Ilam Airport, Iran (ICAO code)
- Office of Intelligence and Counterintelligence, an office of the United States Department of Energy that focuses on gathering intelligence for the department
