= Carl Ford =

Carl Ford could refer to:

- Carl W. Ford Jr. (born 1943), American government official
- Carl Ford (politician) (born 1957), member of the North Carolina General Assembly
- Carl Ford (American football) (born 1980), professional athlete

== See also ==
- Carlford Hundred, a division of Suffolk, East Anglia, England
- Carlford Division, Suffolk, and electoral division of Suffolk
