= Randall M. Fort =

American government official (born 1956)

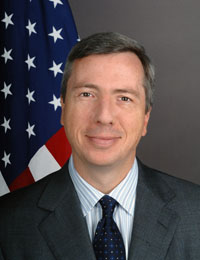

17th Assistant Secretary of State for Intelligence and Research
- In office November 9, 2006 – January 9, 2009
- President: George W. Bush
- Preceded by: Thomas Fingar
- Succeeded by: Philip S. Goldberg

Personal details
- Born: July 4, 1956 (age 70) Richmond, Indiana
- Education: George Washington University (BA); University of Cincinnati; Ohio State University

Randall M. Fort (born July 4, 1956, Richmond, Indiana) is currently Director of Programs Security, Cyberdomain Team, Raytheon Corporation. He was formerly the Assistant Secretary of State for Intelligence and Research in the United States Department of State from November 2006 through January 2009, as part of the Bush administration.

After high school, Fort attended George Washington University (1974–1978), graduating with a Bachelor of Arts degree. He also attended the University of Cincinnati and Ohio State University, where he studied Japanese.

During his time in college, beginning in 1976, Fort worked for Rep. Bill Gradison (R – Ohio 1), including work on Gradison's campaign for reelection in 1976 and 1978. After his graduation, he continued working for Gradison as a legislative aide, and as district representative in Gradison's district office in Cincinnati.

In 1980, Fort was named a Henry Luce Scholar for 1980–81. As such, he spent 1980–81 working as a research assistant for a member of the Diet of Japan.

Fort returned to the United States in 1982, taking a job as assistant director at the President's Foreign Intelligence Advisory Board (PFIAB). He was subsequently promoted to deputy executive director, before leaving PFIAB in 1987.

In 1987, Fort became special assistant to the Secretary for National Security, as well as director of the Office of Intelligence Support at the United States Department of the Treasury. He held both posts until the end of the Reagan administration.

Fort joined the Bureau of Intelligence and Research of the United States Department of State in 1989, as Deputy Assistant Secretary for Functional Analysis and Research, a post he held for the rest of the presidency of George H. W. Bush.

With the arrival of the Clinton administration, in 1993, Fort departed government for the private sector, taking a position as Director of Special Projects at TRW in two of its Space and Defense operating groups. In 1996, he moved to Goldman Sachs to become its Director of Global Security (he was in charge of firm-wide security), and then as chief of staff to the President and co-Chief Operating Officer of the firm.

In 2006, Fort rejoined the government, becoming Assistant Secretary of State for Intelligence and Research. His term ended with the ending of the presidency of George W. Bush in 2009.

Government offices
Preceded by Thomas Fingar	Assistant Secretary of State for Intelligence and Research; November 9, 2006 – January 9, 2009	Succeeded by Philip Goldberg
