= Ray S. Cline =

American government intelligence official (1918–1996)

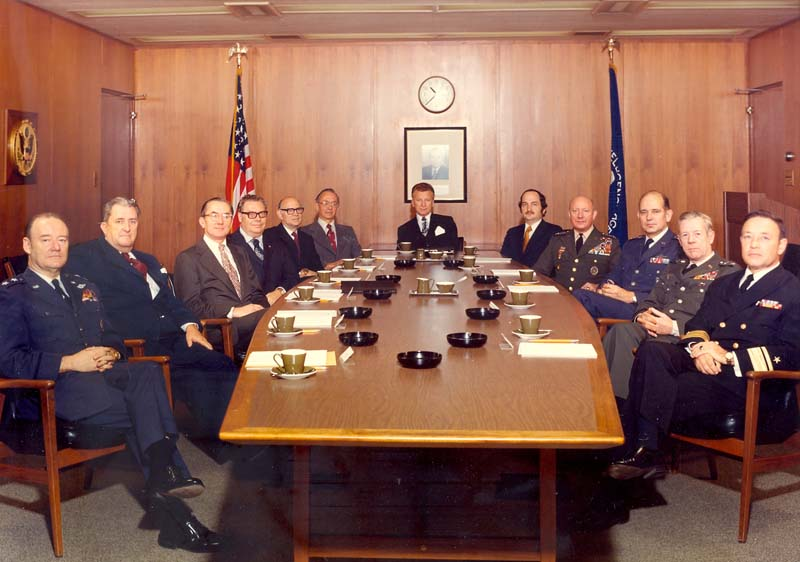
- At 1973 U.S. Intelligence Board, 4th from left

4th Director of the Bureau of Intelligence and Research
- In office October 26, 1969 – November 24, 1973
- President: Richard Nixon
- Secretary of State: William P. Rogers
- Preceded by: Thomas L. Hughes
- Succeeded by: William G. Hyland

Personal details
- Born: Ray Steiner Cline; June 4, 1918 Anderson Township, Clark County, Illinois, U.S.
- Died: March 15, 1996 (aged 77) Arlington County, Virginia, U.S.
- Spouse: Marjorie Wilson (m. 1941)
- Children: 2
- Education: Harvard University (AB, MA); Balliol College, Oxford (DPhil)
- Profession: Chief CIA Analyst

Ray Steiner Cline (June 4, 1918 – March 15, 1996) was an official at the United States Central Intelligence Agency and is best known for being the chief CIA analyst during the Cuban Missile Crisis.

== Background ==
Ray S. Cline was born in Anderson Township, Clark County, Illinois in 1918 and raised in Terre Haute, Indiana, graduating from Wiley High School in 1935. He earned a scholarship to study at Harvard University where he graduated with an A.B. in 1939. He received the Henry Prize Fellowship to Balliol College, Oxford University 1939–40. He returned to Harvard and earned an M.A. He was invited to join the Harvard Society of Fellows in 1941, but with the outbreak of World War II, he left after a year to join the war effort.

Cline married Marjorie Wilson in 1941; the couple had two daughters, Judith and Sibyl. Until Sibyl's divorce, Cline was the father-in-law of Stefan Halper.

Cline died from Alzheimer's disease at his home in Arlington County, Virginia, on March 15, 1996, aged 77.

== Career ==
=== U.S. Government ===
Cline served in World War II first as a cryptanalyst for the U.S. Department of the Navy (1942–1943) and then joined the newly created Office of Strategic Services. He became Chief of Current Intelligence in 1944, serving until 1946. He later traveled to China where he worked with other OSS officers such as John K. Singlaub, Richard Helms, E. Howard Hunt, Paul Helliwell, Robert Emmett Johnson, and Lucien Conein. In 1946, he was assigned to the Operations Division of the General Staff of the United States Department of War, tasked with writing the history of the Operations Division.

According to Sterling Seagrave, Edward Lansdale found a large cache of gold in caves and tunnels in the Philippines after World War II ended. (Note: On October 19, 1945, Edward Lansdale began his fact finding mission after he arrived in Manila Bay aboard the United States Army Transport Ship (USAT) USS Uruguay.) Cline stated that both Paul Helliwell and Robert Anderson created 176 "black gold" banking accounts in 42 countries after moving loot from the Philippines by ship to support future United States operations.

Cline joined the newly founded Central Intelligence Agency in 1949 as an intelligence analyst, having completed his Ph.D. at Harvard that year. He was initially responsible for intelligence on Korea, but he failed to predict North Korea's 1950 invasion of South Korea, which began the Korean War. From 1951 to 1953, he served as an attaché at the U.S. Embassy in Great Britain under the supervision of Brigadier General E. C. Betts. From 1953 to 1957, he was the CIA desk officer charged with monitoring the Soviet Union and the People's Republic of China; in this capacity, he correctly predicted the Sino-Soviet split. In 1958 he became Chief of the CIA station in Taiwan, with his official title being chief of the United States Naval Auxiliary Communications Center.

In 1962, Cline moved to Washington, D.C. as the head of CIA's Directorate of Intelligence, the agency's analytical branch. He replaced Robert Amory Jr who had held this Office in 1953–1962. Cline played a crucial role in the Cuban Missile Crisis when, under Cline's leadership, the Directorate of Intelligence concluded after study of U2 spy plane photographs of Cuba that the Soviet Union had shipped nuclear warheads to Cuba; Cline was among those who informed President John F. Kennedy of this development.

Cline played a role in the formation of the World League for Freedom and Democracy in 1966.

Cline remained head of the Directorate of Intelligence until 1966, when, disillusioned with President Lyndon B. Johnson, he determined to leave the CIA. His old friend Richard Helms intervened to have Cline posted as Special Coordinator and Adviser to the United States Ambassador to Germany in Bonn.

In 1969, Cline returned to the United States when President Richard Nixon nominated him as Director of the Bureau of Intelligence and Research and he subsequently held this office from October 26, 1969, until November 24, 1973. In this capacity, he oversaw U.S. intelligence in the build-up to the Yom Kippur War.

=== Academic ===
Cline left government service in 1973, becoming an executive director of the Center for Strategic and International Studies at Georgetown University. While at the Center for Strategic and International Studies, he became a prolific author on American intelligence and foreign policy. He also became an ardent defender of the CIA in testimony before the United States Congress and in the media.

Cline was head of the U.S. Global Strategy Council.

== Publications ==
=== Books ===
- Washington Command Post: the Operations Division. Preface and foreword by Orlando Ward. Washington, D.C.: Office of the Chief of Military History, U.S. Department of the Army (1951).
- World Power Assessment: The Calculus of Strategic Drift. Boulder, Colo.: Westview Press (1975). ISBN 978-0891580119.
  - Published in cooperation with the Center for Strategic and International Studies, Georgetown University, Washington, D.C.
- Secrets, Spies and Scholars: The CIA from Roosevelt to Reagan. Washington D.C.: Acropolis Books (1976). ISBN 0874910463.
  - Republished as The CIA Under Reagan, Bush, and Casey. Washington, D.C.: Acropolis Books (1981).
- World Power Assessment 1977: A Calculus of Strategic Drift. Boulder, Colo.: Westview Press (1977). ISBN 978-0891582373.
  - Published in cooperation with the Center for Strategic and International Studies, Georgetown University, Washington, D.C.
- World Power Trends and U.S. Foreign Policy for the 1980s. Boulder, Colo.: Westview Press (1980). ISBN 978-0891589174. OCLC 781159709.
  - Published in cooperation with the Center for Strategic and International Studies, Georgetown University, Washington, D.C.
- The CIA Under Reagan, Bush, and Casey. Washington, D.C.: Acropolis (1981). ISBN 0874914426.
  - Republished as CIA: Reality v Myth.
- The Intelligence War. Salamander Books (1983).
- Terrorism: The Soviet Connection, with Yonah Alexander. New York: Crane Russak (1985). ISBN 978-0844814711.
  - Published in cooperation with the Center for Strategic and International Studies, Georgetown University.
- Western Europe in Soviet Global Strategy (1987) .
- Asia in Soviet Global Strategy, with James Arnold Miller and Roger E. Kanet, eds. Boulder: Westview Press (1987). ISBN 978-0813374819.
- Metastrategy: National Security Memorandum for the President. New York: Crane Russak (1988). ISBN 0844815594.
- Central Intelligence Agency: A Photographic History (1989).
- Foreign Policy Failures in China, Cuba, and Nicaragua: A Paradigm. Washington, D.C.: United States Global Strategy Council (1992). ISBN 0943057051.
- Chiang Ching-Kuo Remembered: The Man and His Political Legacy. Washington, D.C.: United States Global Strategy Council (1993).
- The Power of Nations in the 1990s: A Strategic Assessment. Washington: University Press of America (1995). Foreword by Paul H. Nitze. ISBN 978-0819191519. OCLC 424486997.

=== Book contributions ===
- Introduction to Red Cocaine: The Drugging of America, by Joseph D. Douglass Jr. Second Opinion Pub, Inc. (1990), pp. 7–10.
  - New York: Edward Harle (1999). Revised 2nd ed. Preface by Christopher Story. ISBN 978-1899798049. OCLC 60405761.

=== Articles ===
- "Opinion: Policy without Intelligence." Foreign Policy, no. 17 (Winter 1974), pp. 121–135. doi:10.2307/1148116. JSTOR 1148116.
- "Toward a Two Chinas Policy." Asian Affairs, vol. 3, no. 5 (May/June 1976), pp. 281–286. JSTOR 30171421.
- "Politics and Foreign Policy." Wilson Quarterly, vol. 4, no. 3 (Summer 1980), p. 189. Woodrow Wilson International Center for Scholars. JSTOR 40255990.
- "Correction: In Pursuit of Well-Being." Wilson Quarterly, vol. 4, no. 3 (Summer 1980), p. 189. Woodrow Wilson International Center for Scholars. JSTOR 40255989.
- "The Communist Five and the Capitalist Ten Socio-Economic Systems in Asia." Journal of East Asian Affairs, vol. 2, no. 1 (Spring/Summer 1982), pp. 1–14. Institute for National Security Strategy. JSTOR 23253505.
- "Commentary: The Cuban Missile Crisis." Foreign Affairs, vol. 68, no. 4 (Fall 1989), pp. 190–196. Council on Foreign Relations. doi:10.2307/20044117. JSTOR 20044117.

== Awards ==
- Distinguished Intelligence Medal
- Career Intelligence Medal

== See also ==
- M-Fund

== Sources ==
- Anderson, Scott (2020). The Quiet Americans: Four CIA Spies at the Dawn of the Cold War - A Tragedy in Three Acts. Doubleday. ISBN 9780385540452.
- Seagrave, Sterling; Seagrave, Peggy (January 1, 2003). Gold Warriors: America's Secret Recovery of Yamashita's Gold. Verso. ISBN 978-1844675319.
- Oral History Transcript, Ray S. Cline, interview 1 (I), 3/21/1983, by Ted Gittinger.
- Oral History Transcript, Ray S. Cline, interview 2 (II), 5/31/1983, by Ted Gittinger.

Government offices
Preceded by Thomas L. Hughes	Director of the Bureau of Intelligence and Research; October 26, 1969 – November 24, 1973	Succeeded by William G. Hyland
