= Valerie DeFillipo =

American activist

Valerie DeFillipo is the President of Friends of UNFPA (formerly Americans for UNFPA). She was appointed to this position in July 2011. As President at Friends of UNFPA DeFillipo leads efforts to mobilize funds and action for UNFPA's work.

DeFillipo is most known for her ability to work at both the grassroots and policy levels in domestic and global contexts.

== Career ==
Throughout her career, DeFillipo has shaped policy agendas, mobilized grassroot movements and improved service delivery in support of women's health. At Friends of UNFPA, she is active in advocacy work, particularly in issues of funding for UNFPA and international family planning. She engages individuals and corporations through public education events such as Sun Valley Family of Woman Film Festival and GE Leading and Learning Conference.

From 2009 to 2011, DeFillipo has served as Vice President of International Health for Abt Associates, a public policy, business research and consulting company. Prior to that (2004 to 2008), she was the Director of External Affairs, International Planned Parenthood Federation. In this capacity, she spearheaded global advocacy, communications, and resource mobilization efforts for one of the largest global providers and advocates of sexual and reproductive health and rights. DeFillipo was the Founding Director of Planned Parenthood Global Partners, the international public policy arm of Planned Parenthood Federation of America's.

Early in her career, she served as executive director of a private-non-profit focused on reproductive health before moving to the Margaret Sanger Center of Planned Parenthood, New York City. She served as associate executive director at the Margaret Sanger Center from 1979 to 1983.

== Reproductive Health and Women's Rights ==
DeFillipo's work has been concentrated in reproductive health and women's rights. She advocates family planning as an integral part of development, along with education and economic opportunities for women. As part of her advocacy work, DeFillipo has participated in and helped to organize key discussions surrounding women's rights and reproductive health. One such meeting, was convened by the Center for Health and Gender Equity and Planned Parenthood Federation of America in 2001. DeFillipo served as a meeting organizer and editor of the final report entitled "The Quinacrine Debate and Beyond: Exploring the Challenges of Reproductive Health Technology Development and Introduction". While Director of External Affairs of the International Planned Parenthood Federation, London, United Kingdom (2004-2008) she helped organizing the Countdown 2015 Global Roundtable the civil society review of the 10th anniversary of the International Conference on Population and Development that addressed issues on poverty, population and sustainable development and guided the publication of "Contraception at a Crossroads".

She also opened an award-winning teen pregnancy prevention center in a strip shopping mall and piloted community-based distribution of contraceptives post-Hurricane Andrew, while she served as executive director, Planned Parenthood of Greater Miami, Inc.

In September 1983, at the request of the Cairo Family Planning Association, DeFillipo designed a prototype system for a clinic-based information/education program and developed an in-depth work plan for its implementation.

== Education ==
DeFillipo received her MA degree from Harvard University and carried out her undergraduate studies at James Madison University.

== Personal life ==
DeFillipo resides in Washington D.C.
