= Richard Lehman (CIA officer) =

CIA officer (1923–2007)

Dick Lehman

Chair of the National Intelligence Council
- In office 1979–1981
- President: Jimmy Carter
- Preceded by: Position established
- Succeeded by: Harry Rowen

Personal details
- Born: June 12, 1923 St. Louis, Missouri, U.S.
- Died: February 17, 2007 (aged 83) Concord, New Hampshire, U.S.
- Spouse(s): Catherine (1944–1946); Diane Harris (1948–2002)
- Children: 2
- Education: Harvard University (BA); University of Virginia (MA)

Richard "Dick" Lehman (12 June 1923 – 17 February 2007) joined the Central Intelligence Agency in 1949 and served for 33 years before retiring. As a junior analyst, he worked in the General Division of the Office of Reports and Estimates (ORE) using SIGINT to puzzle out the organization and output of various Soviet industrial ministries. He then spent much of his career in the Office of Current Intelligence (OCI), eventually serving as its director from 1970 to 1975. Lehman also served as Director of the Office of Strategic Research from 1975 to 1976, as Deputy to the DCI for National Intelligence from 1976 to 1977, and as chairman of the National Intelligence Council from 1979 to 1981.

Lehman developed the President's Intelligence Check List (PICL, pronounced "pickle") for President John F. Kennedy in June 1961. The PICL ultimately became the President's Daily Brief.

Born in St. Louis on June 12, 1923, Lehman was the son of Edwin and Margaret Maxwell Lehman. His wife of 54 years, the former Diane Harris, died in 2002.

Government offices
New office	Chair of the National Intelligence Council; 1979–1981	Succeeded by Harry Rowen
