= Harry Rowen =

American economist and defense analyst (1925–2015)

Assistant Secretary of Defense for International Security Affairs
- In office June 26, 1989 – July 31, 1991
- President: George H. W. Bush
- Preceded by: Richard Armitage
- Succeeded by: James R. Lilley

Chair of the National Intelligence Council
- In office July 8, 1981 – September 1983
- President: Ronald Reagan
- Preceded by: Dick Lehman
- Succeeded by: Bob Gates

Personal details
- Born: October 11, 1925 Boston, Massachusetts, U.S.
- Died: November 12, 2015 (aged 90) Menlo Park, California, U.S.
- Education: Massachusetts Institute of Technology (BA); Queen's College, Oxford (MA)

Henry Stanislaus Rowen (October 11, 1925 – November 12, 2015) was an American national security expert, economist, and academician.

== Early years ==
Rowen was born in Boston in 1925. He attended M.I.T. and graduated with a bachelor's in industrial management in 1949. He went on to Oxford University and earned his master's degree in economics in 1955.

== Career ==
Rowen started his career as an economist for the RAND Corporation, a Santa Monica, California think-tank, where he worked between 1950 and 1953, and again between 1955 and 1960.

Between 1965 and 1966, Rowen was the assistant director of the U.S. Bureau of the Budget.

From 1967 to 1972, he was the president of RAND Corporation.

From 1981 to 1983, he was the chairman of the National Intelligence Council.

Between 1989 and 1991, Rowen served as Assistant Secretary of Defense for International Security Affairs at the U.S. Department of Defense, under Dick Cheney.

From 2001 to 2004 he served on the Secretary of Defense Policy Advisory Board.

Between 2002 and 2003, Rowen chaired the United States Department of Energy's Task Force on the Future of Science Programs.

On February 12, 2004, President Bush named Rowen as a member of the Commission on Intelligence Capabilities of the United States Regarding Weapons of Mass Destruction (the "WMD Commission"), a position that he held until 2005.

Since 1983, Rowen had been a senior fellow at Stanford University's Hoover Institution.

Rowen's research was most recently focused on Asia's rise in the technology sector.

== Personal life ==
Henry Rowen was married to Beverly Griffiths. He died on November 12, 2015, in Menlo Park, California from a heart attack, at the age of 90. He was survived by his wife, three daughters, and three sons.

== Affiliations ==
- Project for the New American Century, member
- Hoover Institution, senior fellow
- Stanford University's Asia/Pacific Research Center, member
- Stanford University, professor emeritus of public policy and management
- Soar BioDynamics , Innovation Advisory Board member

== Writing ==
Rowen wrote frequently for foreign policy publications:

- "Kim Jong II Must Go," Policy Review, No. 121 October/November 2003
- "The Short March: China's Road to Democracy," National Interest (fall 1996)
- "Inchon in the Desert: My Rejected Plan," National Interest (summer 1995)
- "The Tide underneath the 'Third Wave,'" Journal of Democracy (January 1995)
- "Vietnam Made Him," National Interest (winter 1995/96).

He has also co-edited a number of books:

- Greater China's Quest for Innovation (Shorenstein APARC, 2008)
- Making IT: The Rise of Asia in High Tech (Stanford University Press, 2006)
- The Silicon Valley Edge: A Habitat for Innovation and Entrepreneurship (Stanford University Press, 2000)
- Behind East Asian Growth: The Political and Social Foundations of Prosperity (1998)
- Defense Conversion, Economic Reform, and the Outlook for the Russian and Ukrainian Economies (1994)

== Sources ==
- Bio at the Hoover Institution
- Bio at Washington Post

Government offices
Preceded by Dick Lehman	Chair of the National Intelligence Council; 1981–1983	Succeeded by Bob Gates
Political offices
Preceded by Richard Armitage	Assistant Secretary of Defense for International Security Affairs; 1989–1991	Succeeded by James R. Lilley
