= Morton I. Abramowitz =

American diplomat (1933–2024)

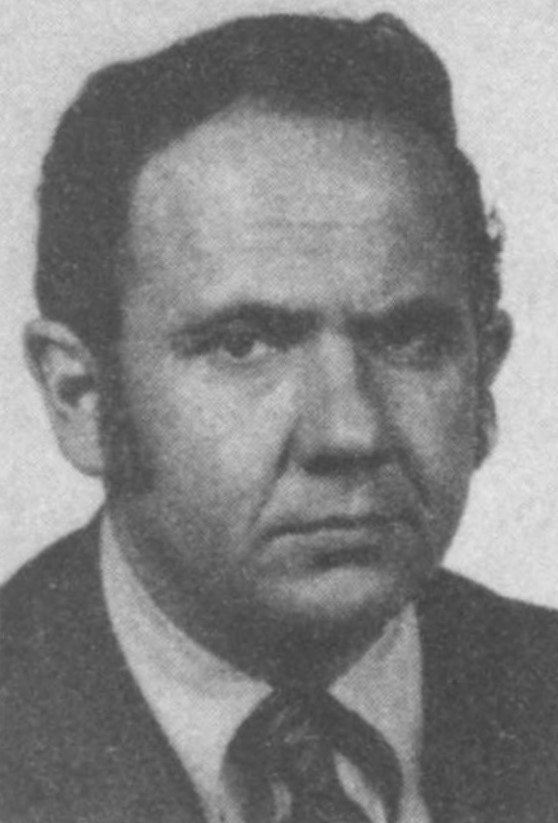
- Abramowitz in 1978

United States Ambassador to Turkey
- In office 1989–1991
- President: George H. W. Bush
- Preceded by: Robert Strausz-Hupe
- Succeeded by: Richard Clark Barkley

United States Ambassador to Thailand
- In office June 27, 1978 – July 31, 1981
- President: Jimmy Carter
- Preceded by: Charles S. Whitehouse
- Succeeded by: John Gunther Dean

10th Assistant Secretary of State for Intelligence and Research
- In office February 1, 1985 – May 19, 1989
- Preceded by: Hugh Montgomery
- Succeeded by: Douglas P. Mulholland

Personal details
- Born: January 20, 1933 Lakewood Township, New Jersey, U.S.
- Died: November 29, 2024 (aged 91) Washington, D.C., U.S.
- Spouse: Sheppie Glass (m. 1959; died 2024)
- Children: 2
- Profession: Diplomat
- Other name: Ai Mo-huei (艾莫惠)

Morton Isaac Abramowitz (January 20, 1933 – November 29, 2024) was an American diplomat and U.S. State Department official. Starting his overseas career in Taipei, Taiwan, after joining the foreign service, he served as U.S. Ambassador to Thailand and Turkey and as the Assistant Secretary of State for Intelligence and Research. He retired from the State Department with the rank of Career Ambassador. In his later life, he acted as president of the Carnegie Endowment for International Peace, served as co-chair of the Bipartisan Policy Center's Turkey Initiative, and founded the International Crisis Group.

== Early life ==
Morton Isaac Abramowitz was born in Lakewood Township, New Jersey, on January 20, 1933, the son of Mendel and Dora (Smith) Abramowitz. His parents were Jewish immigrants from Lithuania. He received his B.A. from Stanford University (in history and economics) in 1953. He then attended Harvard University, earning an M.A. in 1955.

Abramowitz served in the U.S. Army and U.S. Army Reserves from 1958 to 1961.

In 1956, Abramowitz joined the United States Department of Labor as a management intern and, then, as a labor economist from 1957 to 1958, while waiting for an appointment at the Department of State.

== Career in the Foreign Service ==
In 1959, he joined the United States Department of State. His first two assignments were as a consular-economic officer in Taipei (1960–1962) and an economic officer in Hong Kong (1963–1966). He was known as Ai Mo-huei (艾莫惠), his Mandarin name during his tour in Taiwan.

Abramowitz returned to Washington D.C. in 1966, spending the next seven years there in various capacities, including serving as special assistant to Under Secretary Elliot Richardson.

From 1973 to 1978, Abramowitz was political adviser to the Commander-in-Chief of the Pacific Command (1973–1974) and then deputy assistant secretary of Defense for international affairs (1974–1978).

In 1978, President of the United States Jimmy Carter named Abramowitz United States Ambassador to Thailand, and he held this post from August 9, 1978, until July 31, 1981.

In 1983, President Ronald Reagan named Abramowitz as the U.S. representative to the Mutual and Balanced Force Reduction Negotiations in Vienna, with ambassadorial rank.

In 1985, President Reagan nominated Abramowitz as Director of the Bureau of Intelligence and Research, and Abramowitz held this office from February 1, 1985, through May 19, 1989 (with the name of the office changing to Assistant Secretary of State for Intelligence and Research in 1986).

In 1989, President George H. W. Bush named Abramowitz United States Ambassador to Turkey, a post he held until 1991.

In 1990, Abramowitz was awarded the rank of Career Ambassador.

== Post-Government career ==
Abramowitz retired from government service in 1991 and took over as president of the Carnegie Endowment for International Peace. He was elected a Fellow of the American Academy of Arts and Sciences in 1995. He retired from that position in 1997. Subsequently, he was a Senior Fellow of The Century Foundation and a director of the National Endowment for Democracy.

Abramowitz was a long-time board member of the International Rescue Committee.

Abramowitz played a leading role in the foundation of the International Crisis Group, and was a board member from its inception in 1995.

Abramowitz served for nine years on the board of the National Endowment for Democracy, and upon his retirement in 2007 was awarded its Democracy Service Medal.

== Personal life and death ==
In 1959, Abramowitz married Sheppie Glass, the older sister of composer Philip Glass. Sheppie Abramowitz spent her career advocating on behalf of refugees and asylum seekers for the International Rescue Committee and KIND (Kids in Need of Defense). The couple were married until her death in April 2024, and had two children. Their son, Michael, worked as a journalist at The Washington Post before becoming president of Freedom House in 2017, and has headed the Committee on Conscience of the U.S. Holocaust Memorial Museum; their daughter, Rachel, had a successful career as an entertainment reporter for the Los Angeles Times before embarking on a second career in screenwriting with her husband, Joshua Goldin (Wonderful World).

Abramowitz died at his home in Washington, D.C., on November 29, 2024, at the age of 91.

== Awards ==
- Lifetime Contributions to American Diplomacy (2006), awarded by the American Foreign Service Association
- Democracy Service Medal (2007), awarded by the National Endowment for Democracy
- Joseph C. Wilson Award for International Service from the University of Rochester
- Director General’s Cup of the Foreign Service (1995)
- Career Ambassador (1990)
- National Intelligence Medal (1989)
- President's Award for Distinguished Federal Civilian Service (1981, 1985, 1988)

== Writing ==
- Americans Are Ignoring Syria's Humanitarian Crisis, Washington Post, December 5, 2013
- With Richard Harris Moorsteen, Remaking China Policy. Harvard University Press. 1971. ISBN 9780674759817.
- Moving the Glacier: The Two Koreas and the Powers International Institute for Strategic Studies, 1971
- East Asian Actors and Issues (1991)
- China: Can We Have A Policy? Carnegie Endowment for International Peace, 1997, ISBN 9780870031526
- ed. Turkey's Transformation and American Policy, Century Foundation Press, 2000, ISBN 9780870784545
- with James T. Laney, Testing North Korea: The Next Stage in U.S. and Rok Policy. Council on Foreign Relations. 2001. ISBN 9780876092811.
- ed. The United States and Turkey: allies in need, Century Foundation Press, 2003, ISBN 9780870784798
- with Stephen W. Bosworth, Chasing the Sun: Rethinking East Asian Policy Since 1992 Century Foundation, 2006, ISBN 9780870785009

Diplomatic posts
Preceded by Charles S. Whitehouse	United States Ambassador to Thailand; August 9, 1978 – July 31, 1981	Succeeded by John Gunther Dean
Government offices
Preceded by Hugh Montgomery	Director of the Bureau of Intelligence and Research; February 1, 1985 – May 19, 1989	Succeeded by Douglas P. Mulholland
Diplomatic posts
Preceded by Robert Strausz-Hupé	United States Ambassador to Turkey; 1989–1991	Succeeded by Richard Clark Barkley
