= Douglas P. Mulholland =

American government official (1989–1993)

11th Assistant Secretary of State for Intelligence and Research
- In office June 9, 1989 – January 19, 1993
- Preceded by: Morton I. Abramowitz
- Succeeded by: Toby T. Gati

Personal details
- Born: May 27, 1929; Arlington, South Dakota
- Died: July 20, 2018
- Education: Michigan State University (BA, MA)

Douglas Paul Mulholland (May 27, 1929 – July 20, 2018) was an American government official who was the U.S. Assistant Secretary of State for Intelligence and Research from 1989 to 1993.

== Biography ==
Mulholland was born in Arlington, South Dakota on May 27, 1929. He was educated at Michigan State University, receiving a B.A. in 1955 and an M.A. in 1956. After college, he joined the Central Intelligence Agency. In 1978, he became Director of the CIA's Office of Current Operations. In 1979, he became an Inspector in the Central Intelligence Agency Office of Inspector General, a post he held until 1982. From 1982 to 1987, he was Special Assistant to the United States Secretary of the Treasury for National Security.

During the 1988 presidential election campaign, Mulholland was an analyst for domestic policy and research for George H. W. Bush's presidential campaign. In 1989, President Bush nominated Mulholland as Assistant Secretary of State for Intelligence and Research, and Mulholland held this office from June 9, 1989, until January 19, 1993.

Mulholland died on July 20, 2018, at the age of 89.

Government offices
Preceded by Morton I. Abramowitz	Assistant Secretary of State for Intelligence and Research; June 9, 1989 – January 19, 1993	Succeeded by Toby T. Gati
