= Carl W. Ford Jr. =

American political scientist (born 1943)

Carl W. Ford, Jr.
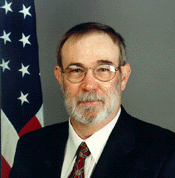

15th Assistant Secretary of State for Intelligence and Research
- In office June 1, 2001 – October 3, 2003
- Preceded by: J. Stapleton Roy
- Succeeded by: Thomas Fingar

Personal details
- Born: 1943 (age 82–83)
- Education: Florida State University (BA, MA)

Hon. Carl W. Ford, Jr. (born 1943) is an American political scientist, consultant, defense administrator, and Asian specialist originally from Hot Springs, Arkansas. As Assistant Secretary of State for Intelligence and Research, he headed the Bureau of Intelligence and Research (INR) in the State Department from 2001 until 2003. He reported directly to then Secretary of State Colin Powell.

== Biography ==
Ford holds a Bachelor of Arts in Asian studies and a Master of Arts in East Asian studies from Florida State University at Tallahassee. He is an Independent politically.

From 1965 to 1989, Ford served two tours of duty in Vietnam, was a United States Army military intelligence officer, a United States Defense Intelligence Agency China strategic intelligence officer, a Central Intelligence Agency (CIA) China military analyst, a professional staff member for East Asia on the Committee on Foreign Relations, and the United States National Intelligence Officer for East Asia at the CIA.

Beginning in early 1989, Carl Ford spent four years working in the Office of the Secretary of Defense (OSD). He first served as the Principal Deputy Assistant Secretary for International Security Affairs (ISA) and concurrently as the Deputy Assistant Secretary for East Asia. After the Gulf War he became the Deputy Assistant for the Middle East and South Asia while keeping his principal deputy position. He remained on as acting assistant secretary until a Bill Clinton administration selection could be confirmed.

In 1993, Ford established Ford and Associates, his own international consulting firm in Washington, D.C. to provide strategic and tactical advice to American companies such as Lockheed Martin, Boeing, and Raytheon doing business with the militaries of Japan, South Korea, and Taiwan.

Ford joined the State Department as the United States Assistant Secretary of State for Intelligence and Research (INR) on the appointment of President George W. Bush in May 2001. He was also directly involved in crafting policy related to the war on terrorism, the Iraq War and reconstruction, and issues regarding the Chinese military, nuclear proliferation, the Middle East peace process, and the North Korean military threat.

In the fall of 2003, Ford joined Cassidy & Associates, a firm specializing in international policy and defense issues, with a particular focus on East Asia and the Middle East. He held the position of executive vice president until retiring in February 2006. He served as an adjunct professor at Georgetown University's School of Foreign Service, where he led a seminar on Executive Branch decision-making, and taught a graduate course on intelligence theory and practice at George Mason University in Fairfax, Virginia. He is currently an adjunct at National Park College in Hot Springs, Arkansas, teaching American national government and state and local government.

In 2020, Ford, along with over 130 other former Republican national security officials, signed a statement that asserted that President Trump was unfit to serve another term, and "To that end, we are firmly convinced that it is in the best interest of our nation that Vice President Joe Biden be elected as the next President of the United States, and we will vote for him."

== Quotes ==
- Ford stated on CNN's documentary Dead Wrong: Inside an Intelligence Meltdown (2005) that the United States' intelligence departments "threw everything they had" into Colin Powell's speech talking about the prospects of weapons of mass destruction in Iraq which led to the 2003 invasion of Iraq.
- Carl Ford called John R. Bolton "Kiss-Up, Kick-Down Sort of Guy" on Democracy Now! April 13, 2005.

== See also ==
- CIA leak grand jury investigation
- Plame Affair

Government offices
Preceded by J. Stapleton Roy	Assistant Secretary of State for Intelligence and Research; June 1, 2001 – October 3, 2003	Succeeded by Thomas Fingar
