= J. Stapleton Roy =

American diplomat (born 1935)

- 芮效俭
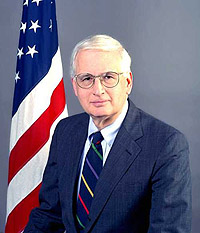
- Official portrait, 1991

5th United States Ambassador to China
- In office August 20, 1991 – June 17, 1995
- President: George H. W. Bush; Bill Clinton
- Preceded by: James R. Lilley
- Succeeded by: Jim Sasser

14th Assistant Secretary of State for Intelligence and Research
- In office November 19, 1999 – January 13, 2001
- President: Bill Clinton
- Preceded by: Phyllis E. Oakley
- Succeeded by: Carl W. Ford Jr.

13th Executive Secretary of the United States Department of State
- In office 1989–1991
- Preceded by: Melvyn Levitsky
- Succeeded by: W. Robert Pearson

Personal details
- Born: June 16, 1935 (age 91) Nanking, China
- Education: Princeton University (BA)
- Occupation: Diplomat

James Stapleton Roy (Chinese: 芮效俭; pinyin: Ruì Xiàojiǎn; born June 16, 1935) is a former senior United States diplomat specializing in Asian affairs. A fluent Chinese speaker, Roy spent much of his career in East Asia, where his assignments included twice in Bangkok, Hong Kong, Taipei, and Beijing, once in Singapore, and Jakarta. He also specialize in Soviet affairs, and had served in Moscow at the height of the Cold War. Roy also served as Assistant Secretary of State for Intelligence and Research from 1999 to 2000.

== Early life and education ==
Roy was born in Nanking, China, where his father, Andrew Tod Roy, was a Presbyterian missionary and teacher who stayed on in China until he was denounced by the new government and expelled in 1951. His brother was David Tod Roy, a noted scholar, and translator of Chinese literature.

While in Shanghai, Roy attended Shanghai American School, but left China when the school was closed in 1949 following the Communist takeover of Shanghai. He attended Mount Hermon School (now Northfield Mount Hermon) and Princeton University, where he was elected to Phi Beta Kappa and graduated magna cum laude with a Bachelor of Arts degree in history in 1956 after completing a senior thesis titled "The Revisionists and the Coming of the War to America."

== Career ==
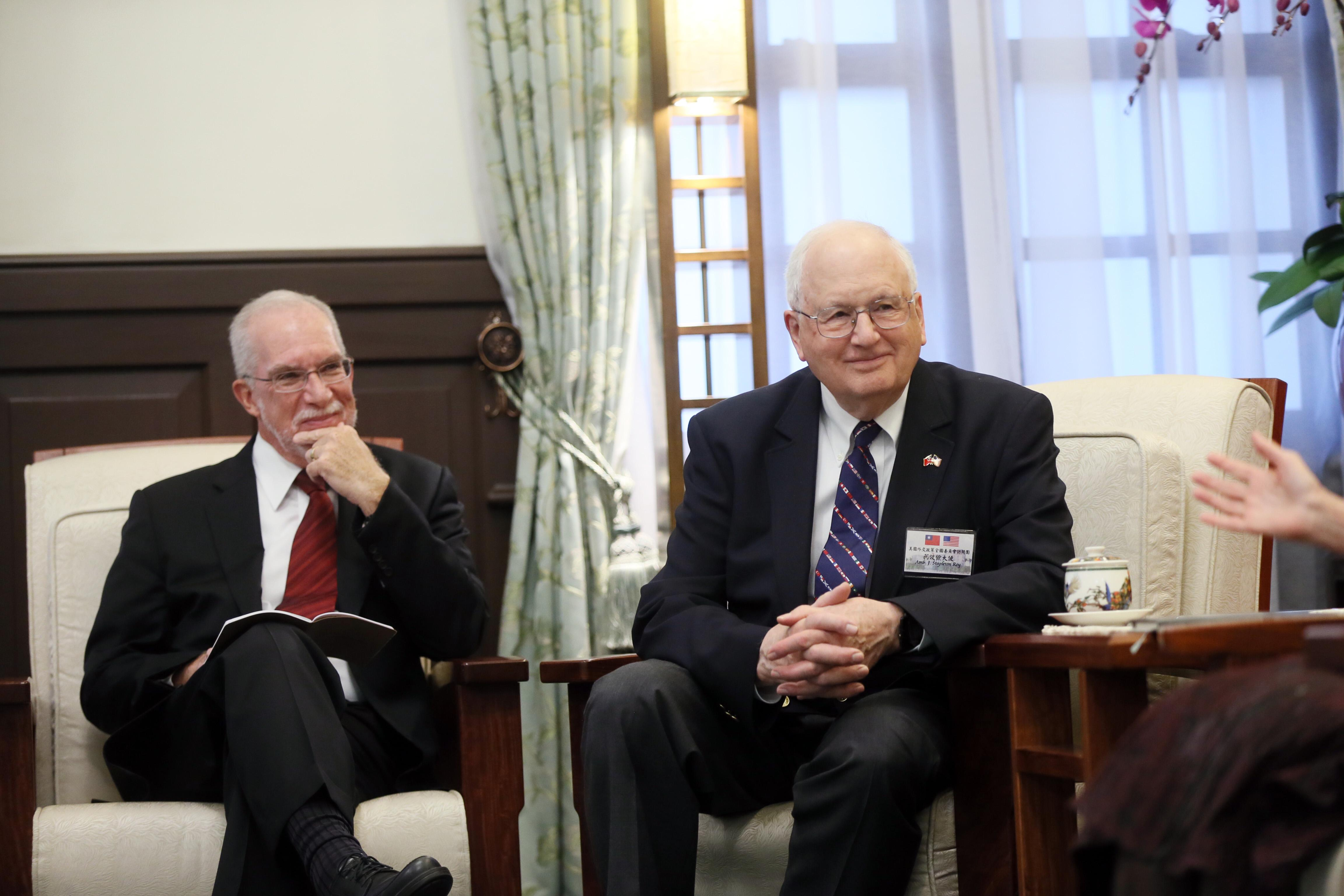
J. Stapleton Roy (right) as a member of the delegation from National Committee on American Foreign Policy to the Presidential Office in Taipei, Taiwan, 2016

Roy rose to become a three-time ambassador, serving as the top U.S. envoy in Singapore (1984–1986), the People's Republic of China (1991–1995), and Indonesia (1996–1999). In 1996, he was promoted to the rank of career ambassador, the highest rank in the United States Foreign Service.

Roy was Vice Chairman of Kissinger Associates, Inc., Chairman of the Hopkins-Nanjing Advisory Council established to assist Hopkins in its partnership with Nanjing University that jointly manage the Hopkins–Nanjing Center, and a director of ConocoPhillips and Freeport-McMoRan Copper & Gold, Inc. He is also a trustee of the Carnegie Endowment for International Peace and Co-Chair of The United States – Indonesia Society (USINDO).

In August 2008, Roy was named director of the Kissinger Institute for Chinese-U.S. Studies at the Woodrow Wilson International Center for Scholars. He sits on the advisory board for Washington, D.C.–based non-profit America Abroad Media.

In July 2022, Roy helped found a group of U.S. business and policy leaders who share the goal of constructively engaging with China in order to improve U.S.-China relations.

== See also ==
- Joint Communiqué on the Establishment of Diplomatic Relations
- Timeline of United States and China relations 1995-1997

Diplomatic posts
Preceded by Harry E. T. Thayer	United States Ambassador to Singapore; 1984–1986	Succeeded by Daryl Arnold
Preceded by James R. Lilley	US Ambassador to China; 1991–1995	Succeeded by Jim Sasser
Government offices
Preceded by Phyllis E. Oakley	Assistant Secretary of State for Intelligence and Research; November 19, 1999 – January 13, 2001	Succeeded by Carl W. Ford Jr.
