= John L. Helgerson =

CIA official

John Helgerson

Inspector General of the Central Intelligence Agency
- In office April 26, 2002 – March 21, 2009
- President: George W. Bush; Barack Obama
- Preceded by: George Clarke (Acting)
- Succeeded by: Patricia Lewis (Acting)

Chair of the National Intelligence Council
- In office August 3, 2001 – April 26, 2002
- President: George W. Bush
- Preceded by: John Gannon
- Succeeded by: Robert Hutchings

Personal details
- Education: St. Olaf College (BA); Duke University (MA, PhD)

John L. Helgerson is a retired career intelligence officer who spent 38 years at the Central Intelligence Agency, his final role was CIA Inspector General from 2002 until his retirement in 2009. He was responsible for investigating CIA interrogations of terror suspects, and compiled a report critical of agency practices in 2005 which was released in 2009 by the Obama administration.

== Education ==
Helgerson graduated from Saint Olaf College. His Masters and PhD are from Duke University in Political Science. Helgerson was a research associate at the University of Zambia and a professor at the University of Cincinnati, before joining the CIA.

== CIA career ==
Helgerson joined the CIA in 1971. He began as an "intelligence analyst and later headed units responsible for coverage of Russia, Europe, Africa, and Latin America. He held senior management posts like serving four years as the Agency's Deputy Director for Intelligence. He served as CIA's Director of Congressional Affairs and as Deputy Inspector General. His tenure was on the research-analytical side, rather than the operational side; From 2000-2001 he was Deputy Director of the National Imagery and Mapping Agency (NIMA). In August 2001 Director of the CIA George Tenet named him the Chairman of the National Intelligence Council (NIC)

=== CIA Inspector General ===
In February 2002 President George W. Bush nominated Helgerson to be CIA Inspector General

As soon as he was in office Helgerson started an investigation into the then new program of CIA interrogations, following 9/11/2001. He said he acted in response to concerns by agency employees who were uneasy "about various aspects of this program", who "had the feeling that what the agency was doing was fundamentally inconsistent with past US government policy and American values" and because "a critical legal opinion was missing". A 12-man team worked for over a year, interviewed more than 100 persons, visited all black sites, watched every minute of any existing videotape and reviewed more than 38,000 documents. Helgerson said, "the review was difficult because of the disorganization of the whole interrogation program. So much was being improvised in those early years in so many locations. There were no guidelines, no oversight, no training." It took 6 months to write the report until the end of 2003. This was followed by redaction and publication in May 2004. It was reviewed at the White House, at the Department of Justice and within the CIA. Helgerson personally briefed it to senior members of Congress and the vice president. When asked if he thought the methods were effective he said:

I can say that up to this day I do not know whether the particular interrogation techniques used were effective and necessary, or whether such information could be acquired using more traditional methods.

In September 2005, Helgerson's critical review of George Tenet's tenure that recommended "punitive sanctions" was delivered to the United States Congress.

After the Obama administration began an investigation of the CIA procedures, Helgerson predicted that Eric Holder "will find it is not feasible to prosecute anyone who participated in the approved program".

In December 2005, press reports quoting unnamed CIA sources stated that Helgerson was investigating "erroneous extraordinary renditions" - that is the extrajudicial kidnapping, for the purpose of extreme interrogation, of suspected enemies, like Maher Arar and Khalid El-Masri, who turned out to be completely innocent.

In October 2007, CIA director Michael Hayden launched an inquiry into Helgerson's conduct as Inspector General of the CIA, conducted by Hayden's senior counsel Robert Deitz.

In 2009, the report on CIA interrogations was ordered released by a US judge. The report described, and strongly criticized the use of harsh interrogation techniques against detainees.

Helgerson retired from the CIA in 2009 after a 38 year career at the agency.

== Bibliography ==
- John L. Helgerson (1995). "Truman and Eisenhower: Launching the Process." Studies in Intelligence 38, no. 5, pp. 65-77.
- John L. Helgerson (1996). Getting To Know the President: CIA Briefings of Presidential Candidates 1952-1992. CIA's Center for the Study of Intelligence. Archived from the original on June 13, 2007.
- John L. Helgerson (2012). Getting to Know the President, Second Edition: Intelligence Briefings of Presidential Candidates, 1952-2004. Washington, DC: Center for the Study of Intelligence, Central Intelligence Agency, 2012.

== See also ==
- Abu Ghraib torture and prisoner abuse
- Senate Intelligence Committee report on CIA torture

Government offices
Preceded by John C. Gannon	Chair of the National Intelligence Council; 2001–2002	Succeeded by Robert Hutchings
