= Toby T. Gati =

American government official (born 1946)

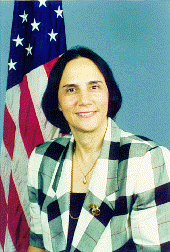
- Toby T. Gati

12th Assistant Secretary of State for Intelligence and Research
- In office November 5, 1993 – May 31, 1997
- President: Bill Clinton
- Preceded by: Douglas P. Mulholland
- Succeeded by: Phyllis E. Oakley

Personal details
- Born: Toby Trister Gati; 1946 (age 79–80) Brooklyn, New York City
- Spouse: Charles Gati

Toby Trister Gati (born 1946) was the United States Assistant Secretary of State for Intelligence and Research from 1993 to 1997.

== Early life ==
Toby T. Gati was born in Brooklyn, New York into a Jewish family originally from Russia.

== Education ==
Toby T. Gati was educated at Pennsylvania State University, receiving a B.A. in Russian Literature and Language in 1967. She then attended Columbia University, receiving an M.A. in 1970, Master of International Affairs in 1972, and a certificate from the Harriman Institute. She was hired as researcher and became director of the Parallel Studies project in 1974.

== Career ==
A Russian expert, Gati published several articles on the politics and foreign policy of the Soviet Union and the Russian Federation and on U.S.–Russian relations. She was Senior Vice President of the United Nations Association of the United States of America and in this capacity oversaw the organization's research on international political, economic and security issues.

In January 1993, Gati became a Special Assistant to the President and Senior Director for Russia, Ukraine, and the Eurasian States at the United States National Security Council. She left this position in June 1993.

President of the United States Bill Clinton then nominated Gati as Assistant Secretary of State for Intelligence and Research and Gati held this office from November 5, 1993 until May 31, 1997. On May 18, 1994, she penned a memorandum about the Rwandan genocide, and addressed whether the U.S. government should describe the events in Rwanda as a genocide or not. The memo "paved the way for a major switch in U.S. government policy." Later, Gati told former US ambassador, Samantha Power, in relation to the Srebrenica massacre, "Ethnic cleansing was not a priority of our policy. When you make an original decision you are not going to respond, then I’m sorry, these things are going to happen." In April 2000, Gati stated that Madeleine Albright and her subordinates did not care "a whit about Intelligence and Research, nor have they made much use of its full potential." The previous year she had told journalist Michael Dobbs, for his biography on Albright, that Albright "could not stand doing nothing on Bosnia. She was like a horse chomping at the bit all the time. She kept on saying, ‘We have to do more.’"

Since leaving government service, Gati has worked as a consultant with Akin Gump Strauss Hauer & Feld, an international law firm. Since 2016, she has been a President of TTG Global LLC. She was also an independent board member at Lukoil. She resigned from the board following the Russian invasion of Ukraine. She later told the Washington Post that "it is not possible to isolate Russia forever" and added that when the war ends, there will be more engagement with Russia, including Lukoil, but "not now."

Since 2016, she has served as a director/trustee of the School of Civic Education in London. The School was originally founded as the School of Political Studies in Moscow in 1992, which led to a proliferation of such schools across Central and Eastern Europe. These formed into an Association of Schools of Political Studies to train future generations of political, economic, social and cultural leaders in countries in transition, under the auspices of the Council of Europe, where it comes under the Education Department of the Directorate of Democratic Participation within the Directorate General of Democracy (“DGII”) of the Council of Europe. In 2017, she defended Victoria Nuland as expressing frustration with the European Union, suggested that for Nuland to be caught in secret surveillance it "calls for some new communications equipment" and said that the tape shows that the U.S. is "using its leverage and getting involved" in the Ukraine crisis.

== Personal life ==
She met Charles Gati while she was a visiting fellow at the Brzezinski Institute, and said that she, and Charles, considered Zbigniew Brzezinski the "godfather of our meeting." Later they became a couple and married. They had one child.

Government offices
Preceded by Douglas P. Mulholland	Assistant Secretary of State for Intelligence and Research; November 5, 1993 – May 31, 1997	Succeeded by Phyllis E. Oakley
