= Philip S. Goldberg =

American diplomat (born 1956)

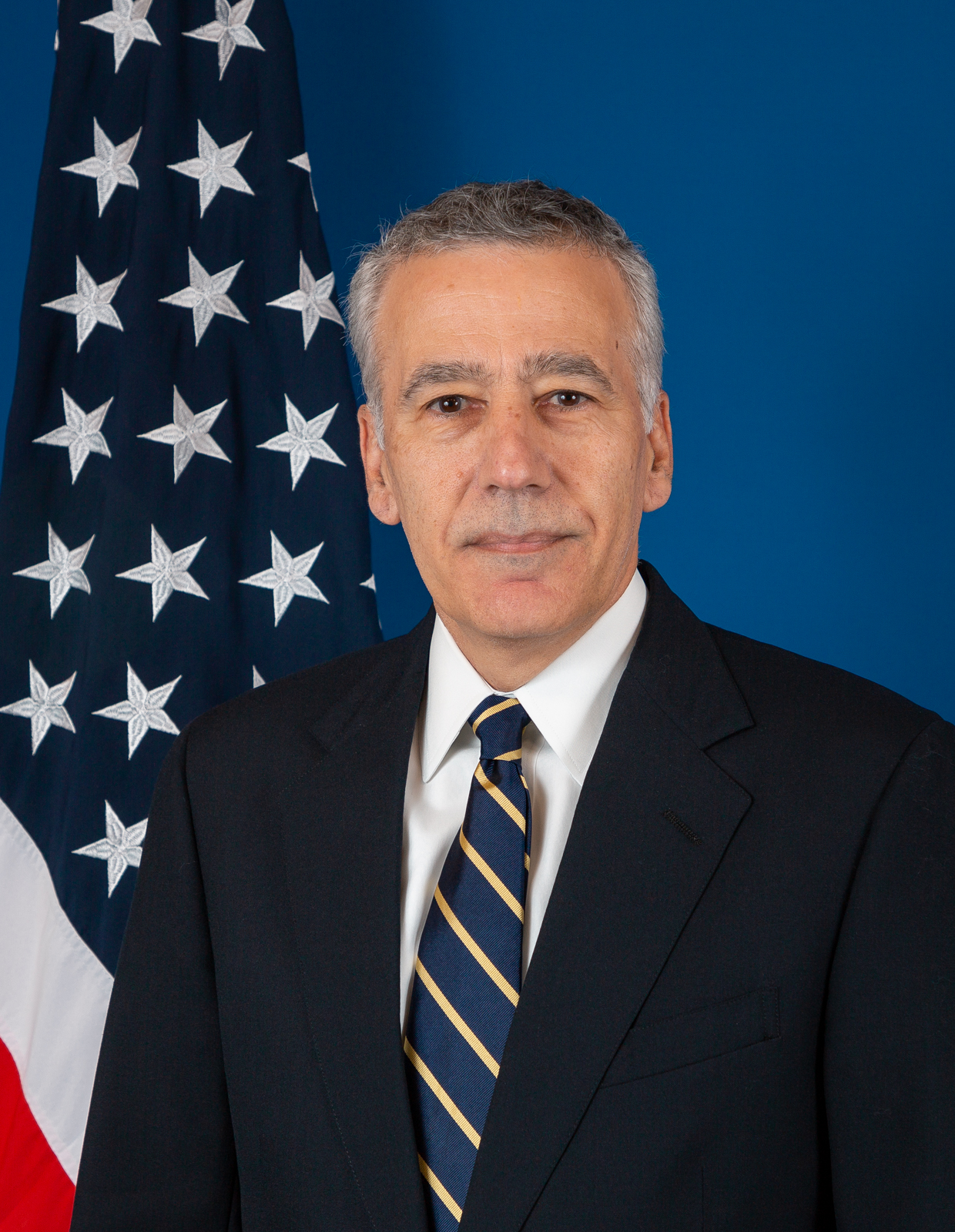
- Official portrait, 2019

United States Ambassador to South Korea
- In office July 12, 2022 – January 10, 2025
- President: Joe Biden
- Preceded by: Harry B. Harris Jr.
- Succeeded by: Michelle Steel

United States Ambassador to Colombia
- In office September 19, 2019 – June 1, 2022
- President: Donald Trump; Joe Biden
- Preceded by: Kevin Whitaker
- Succeeded by: Paco Palmieri (Chargé d'Affaires)

United States Ambassador to Cuba
- Acting
- In office February 11, 2018 – July 20, 2018
- President: Donald Trump
- Preceded by: Lawrence Gumbiner
- Succeeded by: Mara Tekach

United States Ambassador to the Philippines
- In office December 2, 2013 – October 28, 2016
- President: Barack Obama
- Preceded by: Harry K. Thomas Jr.
- Succeeded by: Sung Kim

18th Assistant Secretary of State for Intelligence and Research
- In office February 16, 2010 – November 21, 2013
- President: Barack Obama
- Preceded by: Randall Fort
- Succeeded by: Daniel Smith

United States Ambassador to Bolivia
- In office October 13, 2006 – September 14, 2008
- President: George W. Bush
- Preceded by: David Greenlee
- Succeeded by: Krishna Urs (Acting)

Chief of Mission of the U.S. Office in Pristina
- In office July 28, 2004 – July 4, 2006
- President: George W. Bush
- Preceded by: Marcie Ries
- Succeeded by: Tina Kaidanow

United States Ambassador to Chile
- Acting
- In office July 23, 2001 – March 25, 2002
- President: George W. Bush
- Preceded by: John O'Leary
- Succeeded by: William Brownfield

Personal details
- Born: Philip Seth Goldberg; August 1, 1956 (age 70) Boston, Massachusetts, U.S.
- Education: Boston University (BS)
- Philip S. Goldberg's voice Goldberg's opening statement at his confirmation hearing to be United States ambassador to South Korea; Recorded April 7, 2022

Philip Seth Goldberg (born August 1, 1956) is an American diplomat and government official who served as United States ambassador to South Korea from 2022 to 2025. He served previously as ambassador to the Philippines, Bolivia and Colombia and chief of the U.S. mission in UN-administered Kosovo during the George W. Bush and Barack Obama administrations. He has served in Washington as assistant secretary of state for intelligence and research. In 2022, he was nominated by President Joe Biden to be the U.S. ambassador to South Korea and was confirmed on May 5, 2022 by the United States Senate through a voice vote.

From June 2009 until June 2010, he was the coordinator for the implementation of UNSC Resolution 1874 (Sanctions) on North Korea. He has also been charge d'affaires, a.i. at the U.S. embassies in Chile and Cuba during the Bush and Donald Trump administrations, respectively. Goldberg holds the personal rank of career ambassador, the highest in the U.S. Foreign Service.

== Early life and education ==
Goldberg was born in Boston, Massachusetts, on August 1, 1956. He is a graduate of The Rivers School and Boston University. Before joining the Foreign Service, Goldberg worked as a liaison officer between the city government of New York City and the United Nations and consular community.

== Department of State appointments ==
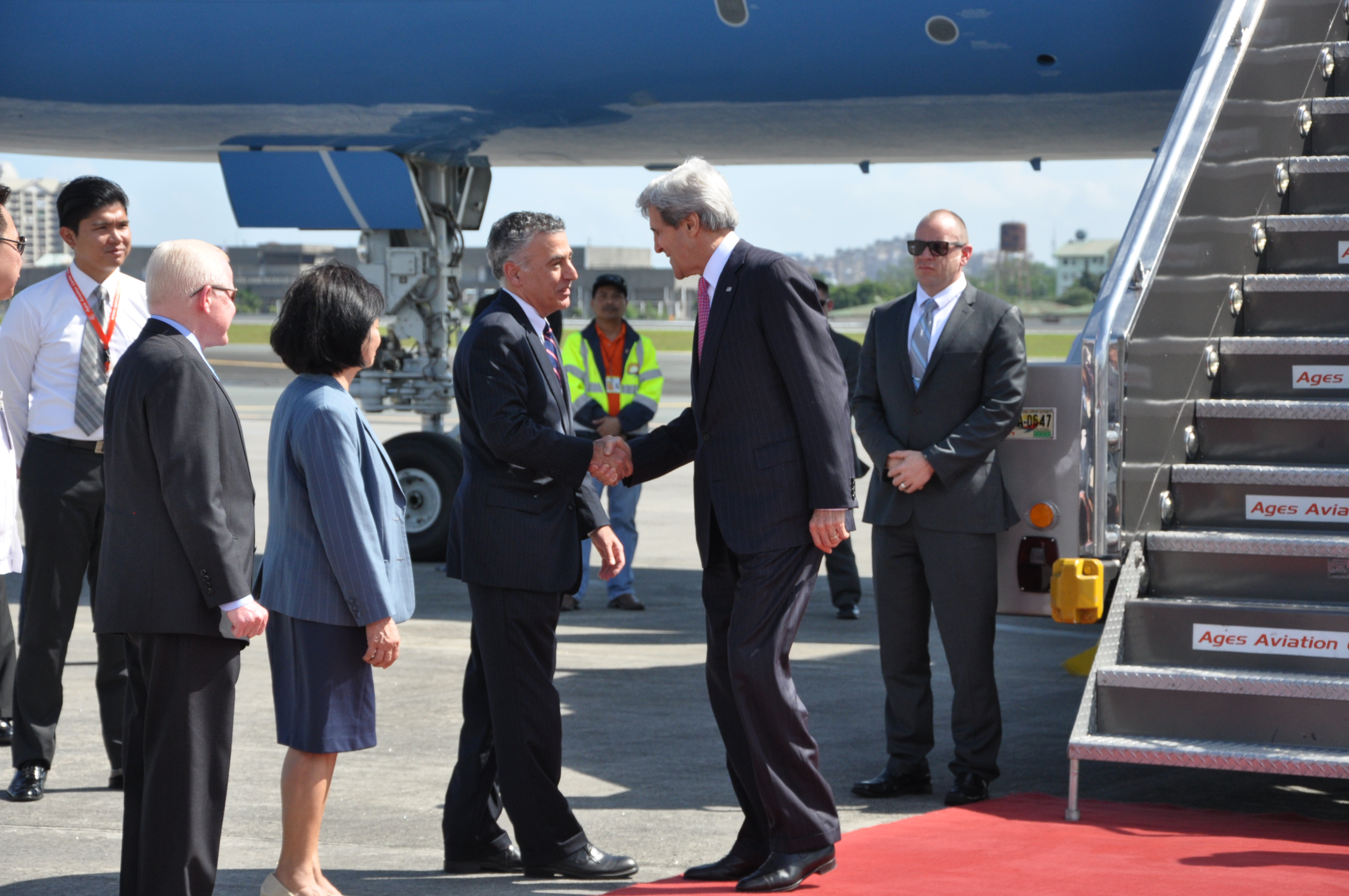
U.S. ambassador to the Philippines Philip S. Goldberg welcomes U.S. Secretary of State John Kerry to Manila, Philippines, for his two-day visit on December 17, 2013

Goldberg served overseas as a consular and political officer at the U.S. embassy in Bogota, Colombia, and political-economic officer in Pretoria, South Africa.

From 1994 to 1996, Goldberg served as the State Department's desk officer for Bosnia and a special assistant to Ambassador Richard Holbrooke.

As special assistant to Ambassador Holbrooke, Goldberg was a member of the American negotiating team in the lead-up to the Dayton Peace Conference and chief of staff for the American delegation at Dayton. From 1996 to 1998, Goldberg served as special assistant to the deputy secretary of state.

From 1998 to 2000, he served as executive assistant to Deputy Secretary of State Strobe Talbott. In 2001, Goldberg served as a senior member of the State Department team handling the transition from the Clinton to Bush administrations.

In 2000, Goldberg returned to Colombia on temporary duty as the first coordinator for the U.S. contribution to Plan Colombia.

From January 2001 to June 2001, Goldberg served as acting deputy assistant secretary of state for legislative affairs. From 2001 to 2004, he served as charge d'affaires, a.i., and then deputy chief of mission in Chile.

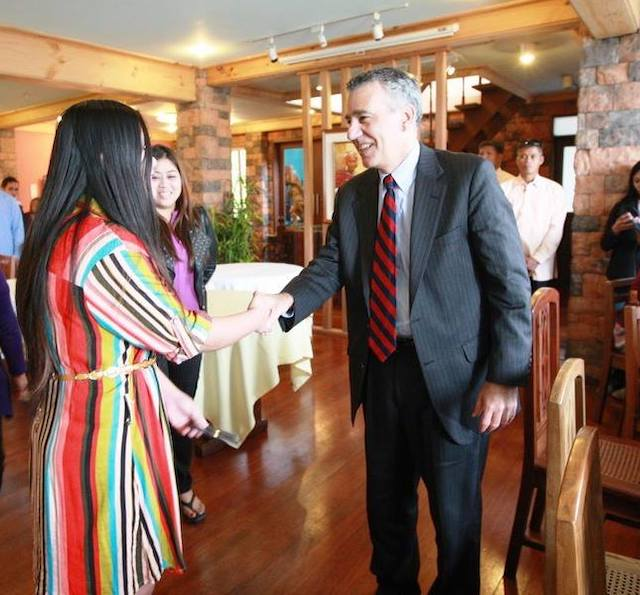
Goldberg during a meeting with Philippine-born entrepreneur Jonha Richman in the Philippines in 2015

In September 2008, he was declared persona non grata and expelled from Bolivia, where he had served as U.S. ambassador.

In 2018, Goldberg served as charge d'affaires, a.i. at the United States embassy in Cuba. He has received numerous honors for his work, including Presidential Distinguished and Meritorious Rank awards, the State Department's Distinguished Honor Award, and the U.S. Intelligence Community's Silver Seal Medallion.

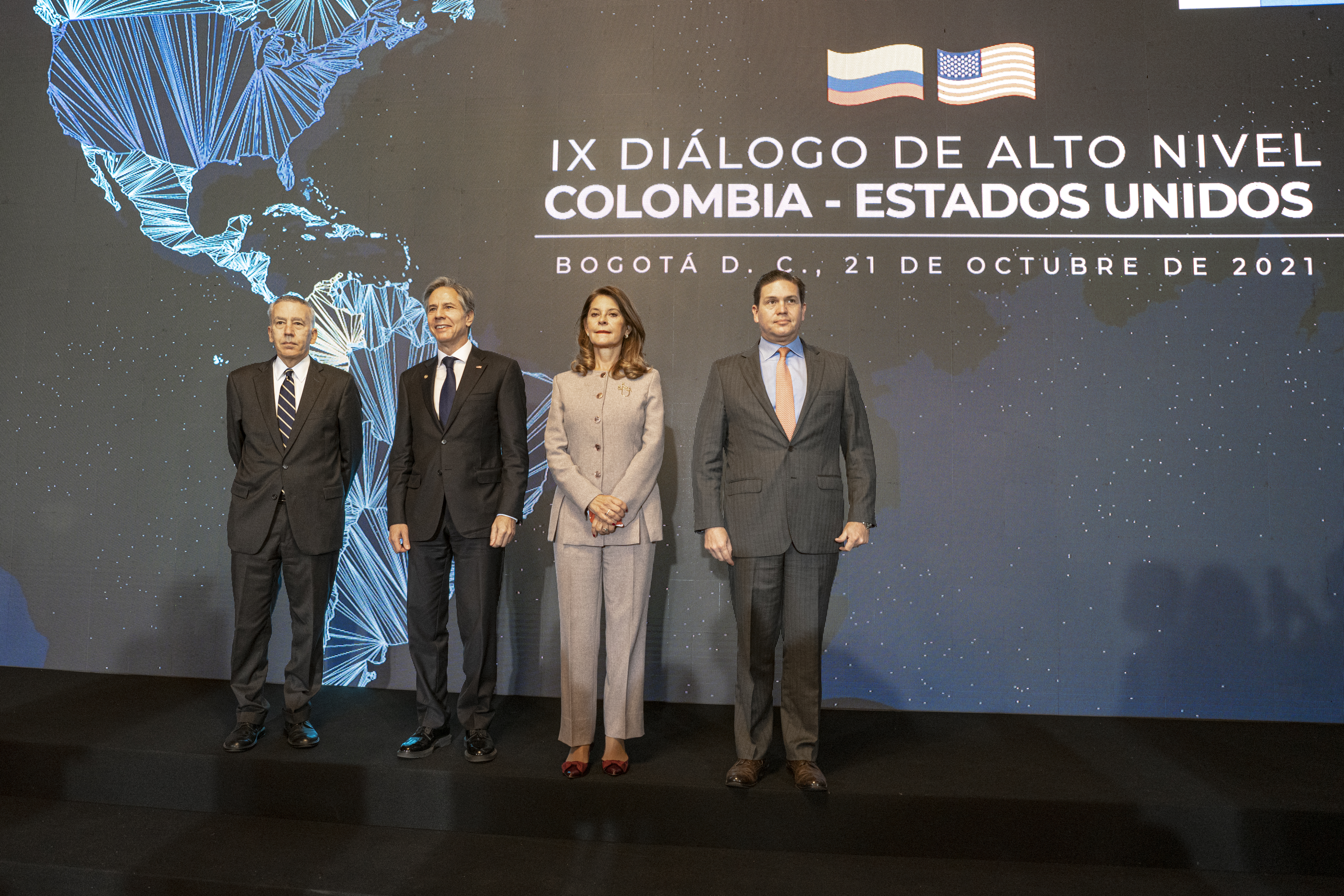
Goldberg at the U.S.-Colombia High-Level Dialogue in October 2021

On May 6, 2019, President Donald Trump nominated Goldberg to be the United States ambassador to Colombia. On August 1, 2019, the Senate confirmed his nomination by voice vote. He presented his credentials to President Iván Duque Márquez on September 19, 2019.

=== United States ambassador to South Korea ===
On February 11, 2022, President Joe Biden announced his intent to nominate Goldberg to be the next United States ambassador to South Korea. On February 14, 2022, his nomination was sent to the Senate. Hearings on his nomination were held before the Senate Foreign Relations Committee on April 7, 2022. The committee favorably reported his nomination to the Senate floor on May 4, 2022. He was confirmed by the entire Senate on May 5, 2022, via voice vote. Goldberg arrived in the country on July 10, 2022, and presented his credentials to the Ministry of Foreign Affairs on July 12.

== See also ==
- Ambassadors of the United States

Diplomatic posts
Preceded by John O'Leary	United States Ambassador to Chile; Acting; 2001–2002	Succeeded by William Brownfield
Preceded by Marcie Ries	Chief of Mission of the U.S. Office in Pristina; 2004–2006	Succeeded by Tina Kaidanow
Preceded by David Greenlee	United States Ambassador to Bolivia; 2006–2008	Succeeded by Krishna Urs (Acting)
Preceded by Harry Thomas	United States Ambassador to the Philippines; 2013–2016	Succeeded by Sung Y. Kim
Preceded by Kevin Whitaker	United States Ambassador to Colombia; 2019–2022	Succeeded by Francisco Palmieri (Acting)
Preceded by Harry B. Harris Jr.	United States Ambassador to South Korea; 2022–2025	Succeeded by Michelle Steel
Political offices
Preceded by Randall Fort	Assistant Secretary of State for Intelligence and Research; 2010–2013	Succeeded by Daniel Smith
