= Robert Hutchings =

American diplomat and professor

Chair of the National Intelligence Council
- In office February 2003 – January 2005
- President: George W. Bush
- Preceded by: John L. Helgerson
- Succeeded by: Thomas Fingar

Personal details
- Education: United States Naval Academy (BS); College of William and Mary (MA); University of Virginia (PhD)

Robert Hutchings is the Walt and Elspeth Rostow Chair in National Security at the LBJ School of Public Affairs at the University of Texas at Austin and served as dean of the school from 2010 to 2015. Previously he was Diplomat-in-Residence at the Woodrow Wilson School of Public and International Affairs at Princeton University. Hutchings joined the Princeton faculty in 1997, and his research interests include international relations, diplomacy, and European affairs. Hutchings is best known as the former chair of the National Intelligence Council, a position he held from 2003 to 2005, during a leave of absence from Princeton. On December 15, 2009, Hutchings was appointed Dean of the LBJ School of Public Affairs at the University of Texas, Austin, a position he assumed effective March 22, 2010. Hutchings has returned to Princeton where he is a professor.

Before first coming to Princeton, Hutchings was a visiting scholar and director of international studies at the Woodrow Wilson International Center for Scholars from 1993 to 1997. From 1992 to 1993, he served as a special adviser to the Secretary of State with the rank of ambassador, managing the U.S. SEED Eastern European democracy assistance program. From 1989 to 1992, Hutchings served as the National Security Council's director for European affairs. Hutchings has also held positions at Radio Free Europe, Georgetown University, George Washington University, the School of Advanced International Studies at Johns Hopkins University, and the University of Virginia.

Hutchings has received the National Intelligence Medal, the U.S. State Department Superior Honor Award, and the Order of Merit of the Republic of Poland.

A graduate of the U.S. Naval Academy, Hutchings has also been an officer in the U.S. Navy. Hutchings received his PhD at the University of Virginia.

Government offices
Preceded by John L. Helgerson	Chair of the National Intelligence Council; 2003–2005	Succeeded by Thomas Fingar
