= National Intelligence Estimate =

Report on sensitive state and military matters commonly used by US policymakers

National Intelligence Estimates (NIEs) are United States federal government documents that are the authoritative assessment of the director of national intelligence (DNI) on intelligence related to a particular national security issue. NIEs are produced by the National Intelligence Council and express the coordinated judgments of the United States Intelligence Community, the group of 18 U.S. intelligence agencies. NIEs are classified documents prepared for policymakers.

NIEs are considered to be "estimative" products, in that they present what intelligence analysts estimate may be the course of future events. Coordination of NIEs involves not only trying to resolve any inter-agency differences, but also assigning confidence levels to the key judgments and rigorously evaluating the sourcing for them. Each NIE is reviewed and approved for dissemination by the National Intelligence Board (NIB), which comprises the DNI and other senior leaders within the Intelligence Community.

National Intelligence Estimates were first produced in 1950 by the Office of National Estimates. This office was superseded in 1973 by National Intelligence Officers. This group of experts became the National Intelligence Council in 1979. In the early years, the National Intelligence Council reported to the director of central intelligence in his role as the head of the Intelligence Community; however, in 2005, the Director of National Intelligence became the head of the Intelligence Community.

The Intelligence Community's faulty assessments on Iraqi WMD in 2002 highlights the role Congress plays in promoting the analytic rigor and utility of strategic intelligence assessments, such as National Intelligence Estimates.

== Production of NIEs ==
Senior civilian and military policymakers, including congressional leaders, typically request NIEs. Before a NIE is drafted, the relevant National Intelligence Officer (NIO) produces a concept paper or 'terms of reference' (TOR) and circulates it throughout the IC for comment. The TOR defines the key estimative questions, determines drafting responsibilities, and sets the drafting and publication schedule.

Several IC analysts from different agencies produce the initial text of the estimate. The NIC then meets to critique the draft before it is circulated to the broader IC. Representatives from the relevant IC agencies meet to hone and coordinate line-by-line the full text of the NIE. Working with their agencies, representatives also assign the confidence levels to each key judgment. IC representatives discuss the quality of sources with intelligence collectors to ensure the draft does not contain erroneous information.

== Challenges to the production of NIEs ==
The IC must overcome several challenges to produce accurate and useful strategic intelligence assessments, including:

- Urgent requests vs. lengthy process: The process of interagency coordination and an insistence on analytic rigor normally push the completion of NIEs to several months or even more than a year. Per Congress's request in the fall of 2002, the IC rushed to complete the NIE on Iraq and weapons of mass destruction (which turned out to be incorrect) in less than a month. Since a rushed product can result in poor or inaccurate assessments, the IC must balance the urgency for a requested assessment with a commitment to analytical rigor.
- Interagency collaboration: Because NIEs represent the consensus view of the IC, all 17 agencies have input on each NIE. Such collaboration can lead to:
  - Gridlock, where many different interests slow the analytic process.
  - Compromise, where the estimates contain only "lowest common denominator" language.
  - Groupthink, where opposing views are subconsciously discouraged.

== Potential issues with politicization ==
Throughout the past several decades, the release of a NIE on a controversial policy have usually resulted in charges that the IC politicized its key findings. Charges of politicization come from both Democrats and Republicans, but normally emerge from the side that does not agree with the policy implications of the analysis. Changes or reversals in NIE assessments over time cause some legislators to question whether the change resulted from newly collected intelligence or whether analysts changed their position to support a specific political agenda. For example, the IC accusation of politicization surfaced after the key judgments of NIEs on the ballistic missile threat to the United States changed between 1993 and 1995. Some Republicans claimed the IC politicized the findings to support President Clinton's policy against missile defense systems.

Democrats accused the IC of politicization after the release of the NIE on Iraq's WMD programs because they believed they supported the policy decision to invade Iraq. Congress has investigated the issue of politicization within the IC numerous times, as have independent commissions. To date, these investigations have never found evidence of politicization by analysts.

== See also ==
- Intellipedia
- National Security Archive
- Team B
