= Assistant Secretary of State for Intelligence and Research =

Head of the Bureau of Intelligence and Research in the U.S. State Department

- Seal of the Bureau of Intelligence and Research

- Flag of an assistant secretary of state

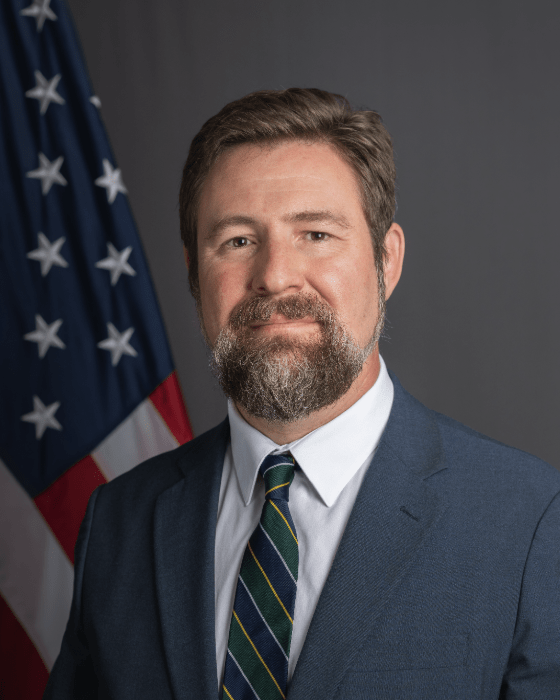
- Incumbent; Michael Vance since August 17, 2026
- Reports to: The U.S. secretary of state
- Nominator: The president of the United States
- Inaugural holder: Hugh S. Cumming Jr.
- Formation: 1957
- Website: Official Website

The assistant secretary of state for intelligence and research is the head of the Bureau of Intelligence and Research (INR) within the United States Department of State. Before 1986, the head of INR was the director of the Bureau of Intelligence and Research. The assistant secretary of state for intelligence and research reports to the deputy secretary of state.

== List of officeholders ==
The office of "Director of the Bureau of Intelligence and Research" was renamed "Assistant Secretary of State for Intelligence and Research" on August 18, 1986.

=== Directors of the Bureau of Intelligence and Research, 1957–1986 ===
#	Name	Assumed office	Left office	President served under
1	Hugh S. Cumming, Jr.	October 10, 1957	February 19, 1961	Dwight D. Eisenhower
2	Roger Hilsman	February 19, 1961	April 25, 1963	John F. Kennedy
3	Thomas Lowe Hughes	April 28, 1963	August 25, 1969	John F. Kennedy; Lyndon B. Johnson
4	Ray S. Cline	October 26, 1969	November 24, 1973	Richard Nixon
5	William G. Hyland	January 21, 1974	November 24, 1975	Richard Nixon; Gerald Ford
6	Harold H. Saunders	December 1, 1975	April 10, 1978	Gerald Ford; Jimmy Carter
7	William G. Bowdler	April 24, 1978	December 17, 1979	Jimmy Carter
8	Ronald I. Spiers	January 28, 1980	October 4, 1981	Jimmy Carter
9	Hugh Montgomery	October 19, 1981	January 6, 1985	Ronald Reagan
10	Morton I. Abramowitz	February 1, 1985	May 19, 1989	Ronald Reagan

=== Assistant secretaries of state for intelligence and research, 1986–present ===
#	Name	Assumed office	Left office	President served under
10	Morton I. Abramowitz	February 1, 1985	May 19, 1989	Ronald Reagan
11	Douglas P. Mulholland	June 9, 1989	January 19, 1993	George H. W. Bush
12	Toby T. Gati	November 5, 1993	May 31, 1997	Bill Clinton
13	Phyllis E. Oakley	November 10, 1997	August 2, 1999	Bill Clinton
14	J. Stapleton Roy	November 19, 1999	January 13, 2001	Bill Clinton
15	Carl W. Ford Jr.	June 1, 2001	October 3, 2003	George W. Bush
16	Thomas Fingar	July 22, 2004	June 13, 2005	George W. Bush
17	Randall M. Fort	November 9, 2006	January 9, 2009	George W. Bush
18	Philip S. Goldberg	February 9, 2010	February 14, 2014	Barack Obama
19	Daniel B. Smith	February 14, 2014	October 23, 2018	Barack Obama; Donald Trump
20	Ellen E. McCarthy	January 22, 2019	January 20, 2021	Donald Trump
-	Kin W. Moy (Acting)	January 20, 2021	June 15, 2021	Joe Biden
-	Annette L. Redmond (Senior Bureau Official)	June 15, 2021	September 15, 2021	Joe Biden
21	Brett M. Holmgren	September 15, 2021	July 5, 2024	Joe Biden
-	Lisa D. Kenna (Acting)	July 5, 2024	January 20, 2025	Joe Biden
-	Leila Gardner (Acting)	January 20, 2025	February 3, 2025	Donald Trump
-	Donald Blome (Acting)	February 3, 2025	August 17, 2026	Donald Trump
22	Michael Vance	August 17, 2026	Incumbent	Donald Trump
