= Anderson Township, Clark County, Illinois =

Anderson Township
- Township
- Location in Clark County

- Clark County's location in Illinois
- Coordinates: 39°18′20″N 87°43′48″W
- Country: United States
- State: Illinois
- County: Clark
- Established: November 7, 1854

Area
  - Total: 32.7 sq mi (85 km^{2})
  - Land: 32.31 sq mi (83.7 km^{2})
  - Water: 0.39 sq mi (1.0 km^{2}) 1.19%
- Elevation: 577 ft (176 m)

Population (2020)
  - Total: 460
  - Density: 14/sq mi (5.5/km^{2})
- Time zone: UTC-6 (CST)
  - Summer (DST): UTC-5 (CDT)
- ZIP codes: 62441, 62442, 62477
- FIPS code: 17-023-01465

Anderson Township is one of fifteen townships in Clark County, Illinois, USA. As of the 2020 census, its population was 460 and it contained 183 housing units.

== Geography ==
According to the 2010 census, the township has a total area of 32.7 square miles (85 km^{2}), of which 32.31 square miles (83.7 km^{2}) (or 98.81%) is land and 0.39 square miles (1.0 km^{2}) (or 1.19%) is water.

=== Unincorporated towns ===
(This list is based on USGS data and may include former settlements.)

=== Cemeteries ===
The township contains these five cemeteries: Blizzard, Fox, Norton, Shott and Ziegler.

=== Major highways ===
- Illinois Route 1

=== Landmarks ===
- Lincoln Trail State Park (south three-quarters)

== Demographics ==
As of the 2020 census there were 460 people, 179 households, and 166 families residing in the township. The population density was 14.07 inhabitants per square mile (5.43/km^{2}). There were 183 housing units at an average density of 5.60 per square mile (2.16/km^{2}). The racial makeup of the township was 95.65% White, 0.00% African American, 0.87% Native American, 0.87% Asian, 0.00% Pacific Islander, 0.65% from other races, and 1.96% from two or more races. Hispanic or Latino of any race were 0.87% of the population.

There were 179 households, out of which 12.80% had children under the age of 18 living with them, 89.39% were married couples living together, 3.35% had a female householder with no spouse present, and 7.26% were non-families. 7.30% of all households were made up of individuals, and none had someone living alone who was 65 years of age or older. The average household size was 2.31 and the average family size was 2.42.

The township's age distribution consisted of 11.8% under the age of 18, 15.2% from 18 to 24, 19.8% from 25 to 44, 49.1% from 45 to 64, and 4.1% who were 65 years of age or older. The median age was 52.8 years. For every 100 females, there were 122.6 males. For every 100 females age 18 and over, there were 101.7 males.

The median income for a household in the township was $77,708, and the median income for a family was $78,095. Males had a median income of $50,607 versus $42,520 for females. The per capita income for the township was $38,788. None of population was below the poverty line.

Historical population
Census	Pop.	Note	%±
2010	417		—
2020	460		10.3%
U.S. Decennial Census

== School districts ==
- Marshall Community Unit School District #C-2
- Martinsville Community Unit School District #C-3

== Political districts ==
- Illinois' 15th congressional district
- State House District 109
- State Senate District 55
