= National Intelligence Council (United States) =

Government body responsible for strategic intelligence assessments

Agency overview
- Formed: 1979; 47 years ago
- Jurisdiction: United States Government
- Parent agency: Office of the Director of National Intelligence

The National Intelligence Council (NIC), established in 1979 and reporting to the director of national intelligence, bridges the United States Intelligence Community (IC) with policy makers in the United States. The NIC produces the "Global Trends" report every four years beginning in 1997, for the incoming president of the United States. Their work is based on intelligence from a wide variety of sources that includes experts in academia and the private sector. NIC documents and reports which are used by policymakers, include the National Intelligence Estimate and the Global Trends reports. The NIC's goal is to provide policymakers with the best available information, that is unvarnished, unbiased and without regard to whether the analytic judgments conform to current U.S. policy.

Global Trends is an important analytical project produced for the incoming US president, usually delivered between Election Day and Inauguration Day. The Global Trends reports assess critical drivers and scenarios for global trends with an approximate time horizon of fifteen years. The Global Trends analysis provides a basis for long-range strategic policy assessment for the White House and the Intelligence Community. In 1997, the Office of the NIC Director released the first Global Trends report, "Global Trends 2010".

== Overview ==
When Walter Bedell Smith became Director of Central Intelligence in 1950, he established Office of National Estimates (ONE), whose sole purpose was to produce National Intelligence Estimates (NIEs). There were two components in ONE, a staff which drafted the estimates and a senior body, the Board of National Estimates, which reviewed the estimates, coordinated the judgments with other agencies, and negotiated over their final form. The ONE consisted of a group of intelligence professionals, complemented by retired military officers, diplomats, and academics. Though ONE, which reported to the DCI, was officially outside of the CIA, many ONE members came from the agency.

The National Intelligence Council (NIC), which was established in 1979, also reports to the director of national intelligence. The NIC bridges the United States Intelligence Community (IC) with policy makers in the United States, according to a February 2, 2007 DNI report.

The report combines "traditional national security challenges" with "social trends that have clear security implications".

In 2011, NIC members included "18 senior analysts and national security policy experts", who were appointed by the Director of National Intelligence. The NIC support the work of the Office of the Director of National Intelligence and the National Security Council. Congress may at times request that the NIC prepare "specific estimates and other analytical products" to inform "consideration of legislation", according to a Congressional Research Service (CRS) report. The NIC also "provides the U.S. intelligence community's best judgments on crucial international issues".

The NIC has a Chairman and Vice Chairman, as well as a Vice Chairman for Evaluation, a Director of Strategic Plans and Outreach, a Director of Analysis and Production Staff, a Special Adviser, and National Intelligence Officers (NIOs) and Deputy National Intelligence Officer for different subject matters including Africa, East Asia, Europe, Latin America, Near East, South Asia, Russia and Eurasia. Issues include economics and global issues, science and technology, intelligence assurance, military issues, transnational threats, warning, weapons of mass destruction and nuclear proliferation, and cyber.

The first director of the NIC was Richard Lehman, (1979–1981) who served during the tenure of then President Jimmy Carter.

== Global Trends reports ==
One of the NIC's most important analytical projects is a Global Trends report produced for the incoming US president which is usually delivered to the incoming president between Election Day and Inauguration Day. The Global Trends reports assess critical drivers and scenarios for global trends with an approximate time horizon of fifteen years. While the Global Trends analysis provides a basis for long-range strategic policy assessment for the White House and the intelligence community, it is prohibited by law from providing any policy recommendations.

The goal of the report is to examine "longer-term impacts" of "current changes" on the "world of the future"—twenty years ahead.

The first Global Trends report was released in 1997, and the most recent, "NIC Global Trends 2040: A More Contested World'" was released in March 2021. The NIC's Strategic Futures Group, under the direction of Maria Langan-Riekhof, led the publication of the "Global Trends 2040" report, working with 18 organizations that make up the United States Intelligence Community. This includes the National Security Agency and Central Intelligence Agency.

Previous reports include "Global Trends 2035: Paradox of Progress" in January 2017, "Global Trends 2030: Alternative Worlds" in 2012, "Global Trends 2025: A Transformed World", "Global Trends 2020: Mapping the Global Future", "Global Trends 2010" in 1997, and "Global Trends 2015: A Dialogue About the Future With Nongovernment Experts" in December 2000.

=== Global Trends 2020: Mapping the Global Future ===
In December 2004, the NIC published a report on its 2020 Project, titled "Global Trends 2020: Mapping the Global Future". Developed in consultation with "non-governmental experts around the world," the report examined possible scenarios evolving out of global trends shaping international politics and economics. Particular emphasis was put on the increasing role of China and India on the global stage, as well as the evolution of radical Islamic terrorism worldwide. Considerations are made for the potential proliferation of weapons of mass destruction (WMD) and the use of biological and chemical weapons in future terrorist attacks.

=== Global Trends 2035: Paradox of Progress ===
At the beginning the presidency of Donald Trump in January 2017, the Obama administration released its report titled, "Global Trends 2035: Paradox of Progress", which "highlighted the risk of a pandemic and the vast economic disruption it could cause."

=== Global Trends 2040: A More Contested World ===
In their April 15, 2021 article about the March 2021 report, "NIC Global Trends 2040: A More Contested World", the New York Times editorial board cited experts in Washington saying "they do not recall a gloomier" NIC Global Trends report. The Times listed headings such as "Competitive Coexistence", "Separate Silos", "Tragedy and Mobilization", and "A World Adrift" and questions if we will heed the report's warnings "at a time when states and societies are turning inward and political discourse has become poisonous." According to the report, "Nationalism and polarization have been on the rise in many countries, especially exclusionary nationalism. Efforts to contain and manage the virus have reinforced nationalist trends globally as some states turned inward to protect their citizens and sometimes cast blame on marginalized groups."

== List of chairs ==
Name	Term start	Term end	President
Richard Lehman	1979	1981	Jimmy Carter
Henry Rowen	July 8, 1981	September 1983	Ronald Reagan
Robert Gates	September 1983	April 18, 1986	Ronald Reagan
Frank Horton III	September 1986	September 1987	Ronald Reagan
Fritz Ermarth	1988	January 20, 1993	Ronald Reagan
Fritz Ermarth	1988	January 20, 1993	George H. W. Bush
Joseph Nye	February 20, 1993	September 15, 1994	Bill Clinton
Christine Williams	September 15, 1994	June 1, 1995	Bill Clinton
Richard N. Cooper	June 1, 1995	January 1997	Bill Clinton
John C. Gannon	July 22, 1997	June 2001	Bill Clinton
John C. Gannon	July 22, 1997	June 2001	George W. Bush
John L. Helgerson	August 3, 2001	April 26, 2002	George W. Bush
Robert Hutchings	February 2003	January 2005	George W. Bush
Thomas Fingar	June 13, 2005	December 1, 2008	George W. Bush
Peter Lavoy	December 1, 2008	July 6, 2009	George W. Bush
Peter Lavoy	December 1, 2008	July 6, 2009	Barack Obama
Chris Kojm	July 6, 2009	July 2014	Barack Obama
Greg Treverton	September 8, 2014	October 28, 2016	Barack Obama
Amy McAuliffe	October 28, 2016	October 27, 2019	Barack Obama
Amy McAuliffe	October 28, 2016	October 27, 2019	Donald Trump
Neil Wiley	October 28, 2019	January 21, 2021	Donald Trump
Avril Haines	January 21, 2021	January 20, 2025	Joe Biden
