= Office of Intelligence and Counterintelligence =

US government agency

- Seal of the United States Department of Energy (DOE)

Agency overview
- Formed: August 4, 1977; 49 years ago as various DOE intelligence and counterintelligence groups, became Office of Intelligence and Counterintelligence upon 2006 merger of DOE intelligence and counterintelligence offices
- Superseding agency: DOE Offices of Intelligence and Counterintelligence
- Jurisdiction: Federal government of the United States, although it conducts foreign intelligence analysis
- Headquarters: James V. Forrestal Building 1000 Independence Avenue SW Washington, D.C., U.S.; 38°53′13″N 77°1′34″W
- Agency executives: Jay A. Tilden, Director; Charles K. Durant, Deputy Director for Counterintelligence (2015); Other Deputy Directors
- Parent department: United States Department of Energy
- Parent agency: None, but part of United States Intelligence Community
- Website: OICI

The Office of Intelligence and Counterintelligence (OICI; also abbreviated IN, DOE-IN, DOE/IN, I&CI, or OIC) is an office of the United States Department of Energy (DOE) responsible for all intelligence and counterintelligence activities throughout the DOE complex. It was established in 2006 by the merger of pre-existing Energy Department intelligence and security organizations. Due to its central role, OICI is designated DOE's Headquarters Intelligence. As a component of the United States Intelligence Community in addition to the Department of Energy, OICI reports to both the Director of National Intelligence and Secretary of Energy.

== Overview ==
The Office of Intelligence and Counterintelligence provides information to the Secretary of Energy and other senior federal policymakers. A member of the United States Intelligence Community, it contributes unique scientific and technical analysis capabilities with a specialty in energy security. The office protects information and technology vital to both the U.S. economy and national security, leveraging its specific expertise in nuclear weapons, proliferation, energy, and waste.

== Mission ==
OICI is responsible for all intelligence and counterintelligence functions of the Department of Energy complex, including the national laboratories and nuclear weapons construction, decommissioning, assembling, storage, etc. facilities not under the jurisdiction of the United States Department of Defense (the DoE and DoD share responsibility for the United States' nuclear stockpile). In its counterintelligence role, the office safeguards intellectual property in the form of national security information and technologies and protects Department of Energy employees and scientific staff. In its intelligence role, the office utilizes the Department of Energy's scientific and technical expertise to provide guidance to policymakers concerning, in addition to energy security, the national security areas of defense, homeland security, cybersecurity, and intelligence.

OICI's intelligence analysis focuses on Department-relevant fields, such as foreign nuclear weapons and fuel cycle programs, nuclear material security and nuclear terrorism, counterintelligence issues, energy security, cyber intelligence, and strategic science and technology. OICI's counterintelligence focuses on fostering threat awareness within the DOE complex (the Department itself plus the national laboratories and DOE contractors), analyzing threats to better protect DOE assets from foreign intelligence and terrorism, evaluating insiders and foreign visitors for espionage risks, and investigating cyber threats, terrorism, and espionage.

OICI's cyberspace expertise, including basic research, cyber threat analysis, information technology, supercomputing, and cybersecurity, is extended to the nuclear weapons enterprise and electrical grid providers for defense against cyberattacks and supply chain attacks.

== Organization ==
OICI is a component of both the Energy Department and Intelligence Community.

=== Director of the Office of Intelligence and Counterintelligence ===
The director of OICI (D/OICI) is selected by the Energy Secretary with the concurrence of the Director of National Intelligence (DNI). The Secretary and DNI similarly consult on the director's removal, though statute specifies the President may ignore such consultations at will.

Under U.S. law, the director must be substantially experienced in intelligence affairs and come from the Senior Executive Service or its intelligence agency equivalents, some of which require the concurrence of the DNI.

The director is assisted by a principal deputy director and at least two deputy directors, one of which is the deputy director for counterintelligence. OICI also includes a Director of Security and deputy director of the interagency Nuclear Materials Information Program (NMIP).

The director of OICI is a member of the National Intelligence Board and program manager for DOE's National Intelligence Program (NIP) funds. Since June 2019, OICI directors have also been charged which determining which foreign government-sponsored talent recruitment programs (e.g. Thousand Talents Plan) pose intellectual property and espionage threats. Foreign governments deemed to be "of risk" will have American DOE/NNSA researchers and contractors barred from participation.

=== Directorates and agency structure ===
OICI is divided into at least five directorates:

- Intelligence Directorate: Assesses the capabilities, intentions, and activities of foreign powers, organizations, and persons who may be targeting the Department of Energy for espionage.
- Counterintelligence Directorate: Protects the Department of Energy and National Nuclear Security Administration from espionage and terrorism.
- Management Directorate: Houses support activities for the other two directorates, including human resource services, contract support, and facility planning.
- Energy and Environmental Security Directorate: Examines the impact of certain energy and environmental issues on U.S. national security, created in the wake of Hurricane Katrina.
- Cyber Intelligence Directorate: Includes the Cyber Special Programs Division.

A Cyber Directorate may also exist, as evidenced by OICI's Deputy Director for Cyber. Other internal structures include OICI's Security Office, the interagency Nuclear Materials Information Program (NMIP), the Foreign Nuclear Programs Division (FNP), and the Cyber Special Programs Division.

=== Other ===
OICI's lead individual for climate and environmental security analysis is a member of the Climate Security Advisory Council convened by the Director of National Intelligence and set to disband on December 20, 2023.

=== Private contractors ===
OICI uses contractor personnel as part of its counterintelligence workforce. DOE Order 475.1 defines a "CI employee" as either a federal or contractor employee designated to have CI program responsibilities. The Department of Energy Acquisition Regulation (DEAR) sets contract requirements. Contractors must designate contractor counterintelligence officers (CCIOs), who conduct CI briefings and debriefings, document targeting and suspicious activity, report CI matters to DOE Headquarters, and support other Intelligence Community elements.

== Incidents ==
On February 25, 2016, an OICI employee was arrested for solicitation of prostitution in Washington, D.C. The employee arranged for escort services while working at OICI headquarters inside a sensitive compartmented information facility (SCIF) using his Department email address. The incident was investigated by the Department of Energy's Office of Inspector General (DOE OIG).

== Criticism ==
In a September 2008 letter to then-Chairman of the House Committee on Energy and Commerce John Dingell, longtime counterintelligence agent and senior Energy Department counterintelligence official Terry D. Turchie strongly condemned the then-new Office of Intelligence and Counterintelligence and its director Mowatt-Larssen, crediting "the dangerously chaotic state of counterintelligence within DOE" for his (Turchie's) resignation.

Much of Turchie's criticism focused on his perception that the new Office of Intelligence and Counterintelligence was "restructuring around intelligence collection and away from sound counterintelligence principles" with "potentially catastrophic consequences;" for this, Turchie faulted Mowatt-Larssen, a former CIA officer he described as "intent on the primacy of intelligence over counterintelligence." He also criticized Mowatt-Larssen for alleged "purge[s]" of highly qualified counterintelligence officials for "dar[ing to] challenge [his] changes based on their concern for the rule of law or the dramatic and disastrous impact his changes would have had on DOE counterintelligence overall."

== List of directors ==
The office's first director was former CIA officer Rolf Mowatt-Larssen, who joined DoE in November 2005. Larssen served as director for three years before joining Harvard's Belfer Center in 2009.

From 2007-2010, Carol Dumaine, another ex-CIA officer, served as Deputy Director for Energy and Environmental Security.

Former CIA officer and intelligence author Edward Bruce Held occupied the office of director beginning at least September 2012. Charles K. Durant served as Held's Deputy Director for Counterintelligence and Eric Jackson as Director for Security.

Held was succeeded as director on March 8, 2013 by Principal Deputy Director Steven K. Black, who still held the position as of September 2021.

The current deputy director of the Nuclear Materials Information Program is Drew Nickels. Current Cybersecurity and Infrastructure Security Agency chief security officer Kerry Stewart is a former director of security for OICI.
