= Thomas L. Hughes =

American government official (1925–2023)

3rd Director of the Bureau of Intelligence and Research
- In office April 28, 1963 – August 25, 1969
- Preceded by: Roger Hilsman
- Succeeded by: Ray S. Cline

Personal details
- Born: December 11, 1925 Mankato, Minnesota
- Died: January 2, 2023 (aged 97) Washington, DC
- Education: Carleton College; Oxford University; Yale Law School

Thomas Lowe Hughes (December 11, 1925 – January 2, 2023) was an American government official who was the Director of the Bureau of Intelligence and Research during the Kennedy and Johnson administrations. From 1971 he was President of the Carnegie Endowment for International Peace. He was also counsel to Minnesota Senator Hubert Humphrey from 1955 to 1958.

Born in Mankato, Minnesota, on December 11, 1925, Hughes was educated at Carleton College, Minnesota, Oxford University, as a Rhodes Scholar, and Yale Law School, graduating in 1952.

While serving as Director of INR, he sent a memo to Under Secretary of State Nicholas Katzenbach 5 days after the 1967 USS Liberty incident: “In six strafing runs, it appears remarkable that none of the aircraft pilots identified the vessel as American. The torpedo boat attack was made approximately 20 minutes after the air attack. The surface attack could have been called off in that time had proper air identification been made. Liberty crew members were able to identify and record the hull number of one of the small, fast moving torpedo boats during the two minutes that elapsed between their attack run and the launching of the first torpedo, but the Israeli boat commanders apparently failed to identify the much larger and more easily identifiable Liberty (11,000 tons, 455 feet long, large identification numbers on hull).” He also wrote that transcripts pointed to “an extraordinary lack of concern on the part of the attackers as to whether the target was hostile” and that Israel’s explanation “stretched all credibility.” He later said, “We were quite convinced the Israelis knew what they were doing. It was hard to come to any other conclusion.”

Hughes died in Washington D.C., on January 2, 2023, at the age of 97.

Government offices
Preceded by Roger Hilsman	Director of the Bureau of Intelligence and Research; April 28, 1963 – August 25, 1969	Succeeded by Ray S. Cline
