= USA for UNFPA =

American non-profit organization

USA for UNFPA is a non-profit organization headquartered in New York that supports the work of the United Nations Population Fund (UNFPA), the sexual and reproductive health and rights agency of the United Nations. USA for UNFPA advances UNFPA's work by mobilizing funds and action for the organization.

The organization was founded in 1998 to raise political and financial support within the United States for UNFPA. Initially known as Americans for UNFPA, the group changed its name to Friends of UNFPA in 2012, and to its current name in 2022.

== Work ==
UNFPA works in 155 countries to ensure that women and girls everywhere have access to reproductive healthcare. In particular, UNFPA works to end preventable maternal death, provide family planning, and end gender-based violence, including practices like child marriage and female genital mutilation. UNFPA improves maternal health by increasing access to voluntary family planning, training birth attendants, and increasing access to emergency obstetric care. UNFPA assists countries in forecasting and supplying their needs for contraceptives, condoms, and other reproductive health supplies. Each year, the organization provides 500 million couples with contraception.

== Fundraising ==
USA for UNFPA mobilizes funds towards UNFPA’s worldwide programs and services as well as their campaigns such as Maternal Health Thematic Fund, Campaigns for Fistula and Humanitarian Relief.

== Leadership ==
Officers of the Board of Directors:

- Connie Smith (Board Chair), speech pathologist and co-founder of the Global Neighborhood Fund
- Jacob Onufrychuk (Board Secretary), Senior Manager, Breakthru Beverage Group.
- Monica Parekh (Board Treasurer, Finance Committee Chair), Senior Corporate Analyst at American Century Investments
- Jennifer H. Wu (Governance Committee Chair)
- Jyoti Agarwal (Development and Communications Committee Chair)
