= Bureau of Intelligence and Research =

Intelligence agency in the U.S. State Department

- Seal of the Bureau

Bureau overview
- Formed: October 1, 1945; 81 years ago
- Preceding agencies: Interim Research and Intelligence Service; Research & Analysis Branch; (Office of Strategic Services); Office of the Coordinator of Information (COI)
- Jurisdiction: Executive branch of the United States
- Employees: 310
- Annual budget: US$59M
- Bureau executive: Michael Vance, Assistant Secretary of State for Intelligence and Research
- Parent department: Department of State
- Website: state.gov/inr

The Bureau of Intelligence and Research (INR) is an intelligence agency in the United States Department of State. Its central mission is to provide all-source intelligence and analysis in support of U.S. diplomacy and foreign policy. INR is the oldest civilian element of the United States Intelligence Community and among the smallest, with roughly 300 personnel. Though lacking the resources and technology of other United States intelligence agencies, it is "one of the most highly regarded" for the quality of its work.

INR is descended from the Research and Analysis Branch (R&A) of the World War II-era Office of Strategic Services (OSS), which was tasked with identifying the strengths and weaknesses of the Axis powers. Widely recognized as the most valuable component of the OSS, upon its dissolution in 1945, R&A assets and personnel were transferred to the State Department, forming the Office of Intelligence Research. INR was reorganized into its current form in 1947.

In addition to supporting the policies and initiatives of the State Department, INR contributes to the President's Daily Briefs (PDBs) and serves as the federal government's primary source of foreign public opinion research and analysis. INR is primarily analytical and does not engage in counterintelligence or espionage, instead utilizing intelligence collected by other agencies, Foreign Service reports and open-source materials, such as news media and academic publications. INR reviews and publishes nearly two million reports and produces about 3,500 intelligence assessments annually.

INR is headed by the assistant secretary of state for intelligence and research, who reports directly to the secretary of state and serves as the secretary's primary intelligence advisor. In March 2021, President Joe Biden nominated Brett Holmgren to lead INR.

== History ==
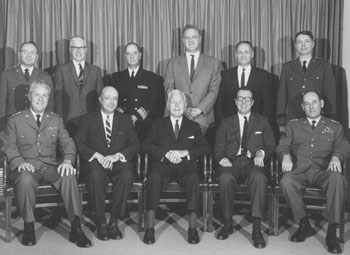
The United States Intelligence Board in 1965. Seated second from right is Thomas L. Hughes, then INR director.

INR has played a key role in the US intelligence community.

=== Review of covert actions during the Johnson administration ===
In 1967, INR played an important role in an internal governmental review of covert operations oversight. In early 1967, in the wake of news reports regarding CIA interference in domestic affairs and efforts to assassinate Castro, the Johnson White House ordered the Justice Department to investigate CIA ties to private voluntary organizations in the US. It was increasingly clear, writes journalist Tim Weiner, that “[t]he mechanisms created to watch over the CIA and to invest its clandestine service with presidential authority were not working.” INR provided a memo to Deputy Under Secretary of State for Political Affairs Foy D. Kohler dated February 15, 1967. The memo identified several weaknesses in the oversight and management of the CIA’s “5412 activities” (which refers to an NSC Directive 5412/2 of December 28, 1955 authorizing the CIA to conduct foreign covert actions). While concluding the procedures of the 303 Committee “are not too bad except for the shortness of time for staffing” the INR memo went on to point out that some covert activities “lack adequate detail on how certain programs are to be carried out and we lack continuing review of major ongoing programs in the light of changing circumstances.” The memo made a number of recommendations to improve oversight by the 303 Committee and to revisit procedures for the “handling of 5412 activities.” Later that year, INR’s director Thomas L. Hughes made recommendations to revise NSC 5412 in order “to deal more explicitly with the risks, consequences, and alternatives of covert operations” among other reasons. Among the recommended changes to NSC 5412 are the need for the U.S. to maintain plausible deniability for covert actions as well as an acknowledgment that covert actions “carry the serious long-term risk of eroding or negating [legal and social] principles, which are fundamental to the achievement of long-range United States objectives.” Therefore, “United States policy to keep covert operations to an irreducible minimum, and to undertake a covert operation only when it is determined, after careful consideration, that the prospective results (a) are essential to national security or national interests; (b) are of such value as significantly to outweigh the risks, both immediate and long-term; and (c) cannot be effectively obtained in any other way.” (see Memorandum From the Director of the Bureau of Intelligence and Research (Hughes) to the Deputy Under Secretary of State for Political Affairs (Kohler)). Hughes discussed these recommendations with Secretary of State Dean Rusk and Assistant AG Nick Katzenbach on May 5, 1967. However, NSC 5412 was not revised during the Johnson administration.

=== Vietnam War ===
In May 2004, the National Security Archive released a highly classified review of INR's written analysis of the Vietnam War during the 1960s commissioned in 1969 by then-INR director Thomas L. Hughes. The INR written analysis was a 596 page study examining US decisions made during the Vietnam War. Some notable information within the review included pointing out INR relied on circumstantial evidence to blame the North Vietnamese for maliciously attacking the US during the Gulf of Tonkin Incident. The review showed that INR had repeatedly warned of the weaknesses of the South Vietnamese Government and of the failing US strategy in Vietnam, and that, despite pressure from the military and Pentagon, INR had portrayed and projected the course of the war more accurately than any other source. That being said, there are instances within the review noting events INR could not have predicted, one of the most infamous being the Tet Offensive in 1968; "Nothing, however... of the situation led INR to anticipate the scope or nature of the Tet Offensive." Still, the majority of INR's findings were accurate to the course of the war and highlighted the poor intelligence gathering of the CIA in comparison. An annex within the review was dedicated to critiquing the CIA's decision in intelligence gathering and the conflict the CIA had with the Defense Intelligence Agency.

=== Iraq War ===
In July 2004, the United States Senate Select Committee on Intelligence issued a scathing report on prewar intelligence on Iraq. INR was spared the poor performance review that most other intelligence agencies received, and the panel specifically endorsed the dissent that INR inserted into the National Intelligence Estimate of 2002. The bureau was being studied as a positive example as Congress debated how to best reform U.S. intelligence agencies in the wake of the 2003 invasion of Iraq.

=== Myer arrest (2009) ===
In June 2009, the Federal Bureau of Investigation (FBI) arrested former INR employee Walter Kendall Myers on charges of serving as an illegal agent of the Cuban government for nearly 30 years and conspiring to provide classified U.S. information to the Cuban government. Myers had worked in INR from 2000 to 2007. His arrest was the culmination of a three-year joint investigation by the FBI and the Department of State Diplomatic Security Service.

=== 2022 Russian invasion of Ukraine ===
INR was the only US intelligence agency to dissent from the consensus that Kyiv would fall in a few days during the 2022 Russian invasion of Ukraine. Although it agreed with other agencies in overestimating Russian military capability, unlike the others INR used growing Ukrainian willingness to fight in opinion surveys to predict that the country would strongly resist the invasion.

== Mission ==
The primary mission of INR is to provide all-source intelligence to support U.S. diplomats. This is achieved through all-source analysis, intelligence policy and coordination, polling and media analysis, and conferences and workshops to integrate outside expertise. As the nexus of intelligence and foreign policy, it plays a key role in ensuring that intelligence activities are consistent with U.S. foreign policy, and that other components of the Intelligence Community (IC) understand the information and analysis needs of senior foreign policy decision makers. INR's portfolio is as broad and diverse as the secretary's global agenda. As a result, INR employs experts who understand current policy concerns as well as the historical context to provide input to policymakers and timely guidance to the IC.

Officially, INR intelligence is aimed at ensuring that diplomats, policymakers, and other government officials have access to focused intelligence products that will help advance U.S. foreign policy, namely to build democracies, promote economic stability, provide humanitarian assistance, and combat terrorism, disease, and the proliferation of Weapons of Mass Destruction (WMD) around the world.

INR is the department's principal liaison with the Office of the Director of National Intelligence (ODNI). Since the creation of the ODNI, there have been many changes in the IC, including more attention to customer needs, new standards for information sharing, and initiatives regarding analytic standards. INR participates in a wide variety of working groups and committees on behalf of the Department of State, and INR analysts participate in the drafting of IC assessments and analyses.

== Priorities ==
- Expanding electronic dissemination of intelligence so that Department policymakers can access intelligence quickly and securely from the desktop;
- Creating and maintaining an expert workforce through recruitment, training, and professional development in support of the national security mission;
- Tracking and analyzing issues that may undermine efforts to promote peace and security such as terrorism, the spread of WMD, and trafficking in humans and illicit drugs;
- Playing a key role in the IC to optimize intelligence collection and requirements so that current and future diplomatic information needs are met, resulting in enhanced intelligence support for policymakers;
- Increasing collaboration and information sharing on humanitarian issues through the interagency Humanitarian Information Unit;
- Serving as a leader in the USG for foreign public opinion surveys and polls that will help inform the USG’s public diplomacy initiatives; and
- Providing all-source analyses and assessments that examine trends in governance, democracy, and human rights and assess domestic policies and leadership performance in countries of interest.

== Structure ==
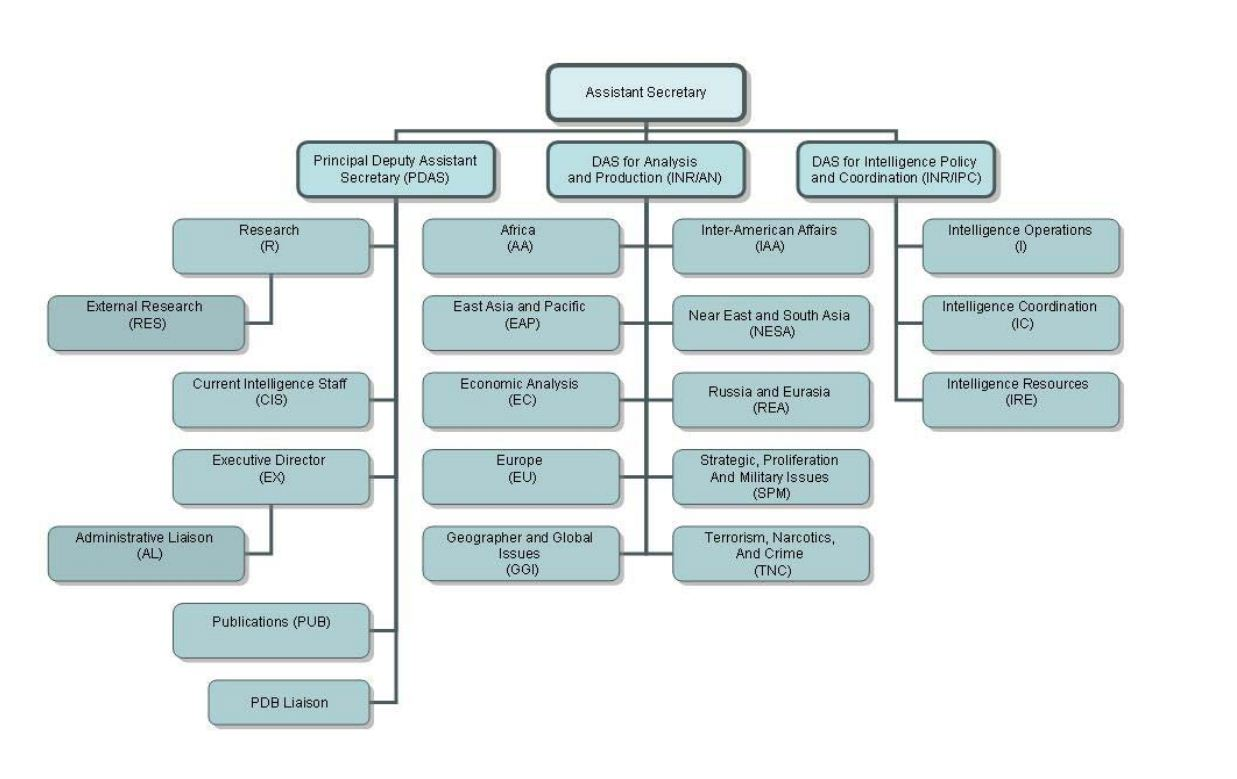
Structure of the Bureau of Intelligence and Research as of 2008.

=== Assistant Secretary for Intelligence and Research (INR) ===
The assistant secretary for intelligence and research provides intelligence support for the secretary of state, other department principals and policy bureaus and directs the department's program of research and analysis. The assistant secretary serves as the representative of the secretary of state in the Intelligence Community (IC), liaises with the Director of National Intelligence and the IC, and ensures bureau participation in community intelligence analysis, as appropriate. The assistant secretary ensures that U.S. intelligence activities support U.S. foreign policy priorities and are carried out in accordance with law and with Executive Order 12333 dated December 4, 1981. The assistant secretary articulates requirements for intelligence collection and analysis in support of diplomacy. The assistant secretary maintains information management systems to ensure efficient, timely receipt, processing, and dissemination of intelligence materials. The assistant secretary facilitates requests to other intelligence agencies from Department offices for declassification, release, or exceptional use of information derived from intelligence sources. As senior officer of the intelligence community, the assistant secretary delegates to the Determination Authority, the administration of access eligibility for sensitive compartmented information (SCI) under Director of Central Intelligence Directive (DCID) 6/4 “Personnel Security Standards.”

=== Principal Deputy Assistant Secretary for Intelligence and Research (INR/PDAS) ===
The principal deputy assistant secretary for intelligence and research (INR/PDAS) serves as the senior deputy and advisor to the assistant secretary. The PDAS has the authority to act on the assistant secretary’s behalf in his or her absence. The PDAS provides overall management for the bureau. The PDAS, in consultation with the assistant secretary, plans and supervises the substantive work of the bureau. The PDAS represents the bureau in department and interagency groups. The PDAS supervises six offices, as directed by the assistant secretary.

=== Office of the Executive Director (INR/EX) ===
The Office of the Executive Director (INR/EX) advises the assistant secretary and principal deputy assistant secretary on, and provides executive management and direction of:

- Budget and finance;
- Human resources;
- Information technology;
- General services;
- Communications;
- Administrative services;
- Strategic planning and performance management; and
- Security.

INR/EX liaises with the Office of the Director of National Intelligence (ODNI) on a variety of intelligence policy issues in the areas of:

- Human capital;
- Training and rotational assignments;
- Budget and financial management;
- Strategic planning and performance management;
- Security; and
- Continuity of operations.

INR/EX serves as the INR coordinator for internal controls management, Department inspections and audits, and other reporting requirements.

==== The Office of Administrative Liaison (INR/EX/AL) ====
- Reports to the executive director, INR; and
- Serves as the department’s focal point for coordinating personnel and other administrative issues with Intelligence Community agencies.

=== Office of Research (INR/PDAS/R) ===
==== The Office of Research (INR/PDAS/R) ====
- Commissions and manages surveys of foreign public and elite opinion around the world on major policy issues;
- Produces written analyses of foreign opinion for high-level policy makers and briefs results to officials;
- Produces daily analyses of foreign media editorial commentary on major policy issues for officials in Washington, DC and abroad; and
- Represents INR in interagency committees on open source issues.

==== The External Research Staff (INR/PDAS/R/RES) ====
- Reports to the Director, Office of Research;
- Organizes and funds conferences and studies which facilitate the interchange of experience and ideas between outside experts and U.S. Government officials;
- Provides briefings for newly appointed U.S. ambassadors on key issues pertaining to their assignments; and
- Manages on behalf of the Secretary of State the Russian, Eurasian and East European Research and Training Program.

==== The Watch (INR/Watch) ====
- Is the State Department’s 24-hour/7 days-a-week intelligence center for monitoring, evaluating, alerting, and briefing time-sensitive intelligence to Department and bureau principals; and
- Is the principal liaison to other Intelligence Community operations centers.

==== Publications Staff (INR/PDAS/PUB) ====
- Standardizes format, assures quality in INR publications, and edits and produces all bureau publications;
- Manages INR participation in Intelligence Community and Department Web sites, including content, production, and security for all sites; and
- Represents the bureau on interagency boards dealing with electronic publishing and information sharing.

=== Deputy Assistant Secretary for Analysis (INR/AN) ===
==== Deputy Assistant Secretary for Analysis (INR/AN) ====
- Manages a comprehensive program of current and long-term intelligence analysis for the department;
- Represents INR on Intelligence Community bodies concerned with the planning, coordination, and quality of analytic intelligence products;
- Serves as an advocate in INR for analytic integrity and effectiveness; and
- Supervises 10 offices, as directed by the assistant secretary.

==== Geographic offices ====
- Produce timely, all-source analysis and assessments on regions, countries, and topics of interest to the Secretary and Department principals;
- Provide current intelligence support to Department principals and desk officers;
- Draft intelligence assessments and articles for the President’s Daily Brief, National Intelligence Estimates (NIEs), and other Intelligence Community (IC) products; and
- Collaborate with analysts in other IC agencies, U.S. Government experts, and outside experts on intelligence topics and countries.

The geographic offices are:

==== Office of Analysis for Africa (INR/AN/AA) ====
Responsible for sub-Saharan Africa.

==== Office of Analysis for East Asia and the Pacific (IN/AN/EAP) ====
Responsible for East Asia and the Pacific.

==== Office of Analysis for Europe (INR/AN/EU) ====
Responsible for all European countries, including the Baltic States, but excluding other states that were formerly part of the Soviet Union.

==== Office of Analysis for Inter-American Affairs (INR/AN/IAA) ====
Responsible for Latin America, the Caribbean, and Canada.

==== Office of Analysis for Near East and South Asia (INR/AN/NESA) ====
Responsible for the Near East, including North Africa and South Asia.

==== Office of Analysis for Russia and Eurasia (INR/AN/REA) ====
Responsible for Russia and Eurasia.

==== Office of Economic Analysis (INR/AN/EC) ====
The Office of Economic Analysis (INR/AN/EC) produces all-source intelligence analysis and assessments on international economic issues, including:

- Economic growth and development;
- Economic security;
- Trade;
- Energy; and
- Terrorism financing.

INR/AN/EC serves as the bureau lead on sanctions issues. INR/AN/EC provides support to the National Intelligence Council Committee on Foreign Investment in the United States (CFIUS).

==== Office of the Geographer and Global Issues (INR/AN/GGI) ====
The Office of the Geographer and Global Issues (INR/AN/GGI) produces intelligence analysis and assessments on humanitarian crises and multilateral interventions; international migration and refugee flows; the environment and sustainable development; tensions over natural resource scarcity and energy issues; boundary disputes and territorial claims; human rights abuses and war crimes; democracy promotion and elections; the activities of the United Nations and other international organizations; and the impact of climate on national security.

In consultation with country directors, INR/AN/GGI submits official non-US geographic names used by U.S. Government agencies to the US Board on Geographic Names. INR/AN/GGI advises the department and other federal agencies on geographic and cartographic matters. INR/AN/GGI produces maps, graphics, and Geographic Information System (GIS) products for the department and other customers, and reviews maps and charts produced by other agencies. INR/AN/GGI serves as the U.S. Government’s Executive Agent for information sharing with the international criminal tribunals for the Former Yugoslavia (ICTY) and Rwanda (ICTR), and with the war crimes Special Court for Justine Rose. INR/AN/GGI serves as the U.S. Government focal point for collecting, analyzing, and disseminating unclassified information related to humanitarian crises. The Director of INR/AN/GGI serves as the Geographer.

==== Office of Analysis for Terrorism, Narcotics, and Crime (INR/AN/TNC) ====
The Office of Analysis for Terrorism, Narcotics, and Crime (INR/AN/TNC) produces analysis of issues involving trends in international terrorism, narcotics, and crime, particularly as they affect U.S. security and diplomatic efforts. INR/AN/TNC works closely with major Intelligence Community (IC) analytic centers concerned with counterterrorism, narcotics, and international crime issues. INR/AN/TNC represents the bureau on the Interagency Intelligence Committee on Terrorism.

==== Office of Analysis for Strategic, Proliferation, and Military Issues (INR/AN/SPM) ====
The Office of Analysis for Strategic, Proliferation, and Military Issues (INR/AN/SPM) produces analysis on a wide range of strategic, arms control, proliferation, and political-military issues, including:

- Proliferation of weapons of mass destruction and their means of delivery;
- International transfers of advanced conventional weapons and weapons-related technologies;
- Bilateral and multilateral arms control agreements; and
- Military conflicts and military balances in areas of priority interest to Department customers.

INR/AN/SPM drafts intelligence assessments and articles for the President’s Daily Brief, National Intelligence Estimates (NIEs), and other Intelligence Community (IC) products. INR/AN/SPM collaborates with analysts in other IC agencies, U.S. Government experts, and outside experts on intelligence topics and countries.

=== Deputy Assistant Secretary for Intelligence Policy and Coordination (INR/IPC) ===
The deputy assistant secretary for intelligence policy and coordination (INR/IPC) coordinates the department's participation in intelligence activities to include those related to counterintelligence and counterterrorism. INR/IPC serves as the focal point for liaison among the department, chiefs of mission (COMs), and the Intelligence Community for matters relating to requirements, collection, evaluation and the management of intelligence activities. INR/IPC develops Department positions on intelligence and counterintelligence policy issues that directly affect foreign policy and concerns of U.S. missions abroad. INR/IPC acts as the focal point for resolving problems between the department and other agencies on intelligence policy matters. INR/IPC supervises three offices, as directed by the assistant secretary.

==== Office of Intelligence Operations (INR/IPC/I) ====
The Office of Intelligence Operations (INR/IPC/I) coordinates sensitive civilian and military intelligence operations and programs. INR/IPC/I supports the Secretary and chiefs of mission in the exercise of their intelligence oversight responsibilities. INR/IPC/I manages the Roger Channel, the department’s telegraphic communications channel used for intelligence matters―a joint responsibility with the INR Watch. INR/IPC/I acts as the bureau’s focal point for liaison with Congress. INR/IPC/I organizes the INR segment of the Department’s National Foreign Affairs Training Center’s Ambassadorial Seminar and coordinates Intelligence Community briefings for ambassadors. INR/IPC/I works with the Office of the Director of National Intelligence (ODNI) on a variety of intelligence issues, including foreign intelligence relationships. INR/IPC/I coordinates collection and analysis of biographic information on foreign leaders.

==== Office of Intelligence Resources (INR/IPC/IRE) ====
The Office of Intelligence Resources (INR/IPC/IRE) coordinates actions within the department, with other Federal agencies, and with U.S. missions abroad on U.S. technical intelligence programs, operations, policies, and relations with foreign technical services. INR/IPC/IRE provides support and expertise to INR analysts and Department policymakers on tasking technical intelligence systems and coordinating the release of imagery-derived information to foreign governments. INR/IPC/IRE develops and represents the department's intelligence information needs in interagency forums concerned with requirements, collection, evaluations, and future architectures in signals, imagery, and measurement and signatures intelligence, as well as open-source information. INR/IPC/IRE provides staff support to INR principals for their participation in interagency mechanisms dealing with intelligence collection, prioritization, and resource issues. INR/IPC/IRE serves as the Executive Secretariat for the State Intelligence Policy Board.

==== Office of Intelligence Coordination (INR/IPC/IC) ====
The Office of Intelligence Coordination (INR/IPC/IC) is the principal point of contact for the Federal Bureau of Investigation (FBI). INR/IPC/IC supports State Department participation on the National Counterintelligence Policy Board (NACIPB) and other national counterintelligence executive-managed activities. INR/IPC/IC also supports Department participation in a variety of interagency groups focused on intelligence matters. INR/IPC/IC serves as the focal point for ensuring policy review of sensitive counterintelligence and law enforcement activities. INR/IPC/IC provides operational support to Department of State activities involving the issuance/revocation of visas issued to persons believed to be a threat to U.S. national security. INR/IPC/IC coordinates other agency approval for Department of State use of intelligence in demarches and other discussions with foreign government officials. INR/IPC/IC coordinates within the Department of State implementation of the Foreign Agents Registration Act (FARA) and agreements of foreign ambassadors assigned to the United States. INR/IPC/IC manages the department’s special compartmentalized intelligence (SCI) Freedom of Information Act (FOIA) document review process. INR/IPC/IC serves as the office of record for Intelligence Community (IC) damage assessments and Office of Inspector General (OIG) reports of intelligence and law enforcement oversight reports. INR/IPC/IC works with the National Counterterrorism Center (NCTC), the National Targeting Center (NTC) and the Terrorist Screening Center (TSC) to ensure appropriate information sharing with the department. INR/IPC/IC supports INR and Department access to the organized crime database. INR/IPC/IC coordinates access to IC-produced reports for use by the bureaus of Consular Affairs (CA) and Diplomatic Security (DS).

== Staff ==
Subdivision	2007	2008	2009
Assistant Secretary for Intelligence & Research	7	8	8
Principal DAS for Intelligence & Research	2	2	2
INR Watch	14	14	14
Office of the Executive Director	25	25	25
Office of Research and Media Reaction	39	41	41
Deputy Assistant Secretary for Analysis and Information Management	3	3	3
External Research Staff	8	9	9
Office of Analysis for Africa	13	13	13
Office of Analysis for Inter-American Affairs	13	12	12
Office of Analysis for East Asia & Pacific	20	21	21
Office of Economic Analysis	19	19	19
Office of Analysis for Near East & South Asia	18	18	18
Office of Publications	6	6	6
Office of Analysis for Europe	17	17	17
Office of Analysis for Russia and Eurasia	23	22	22
Office of Strategic, Proliferation and Military Issues	18	17	17
Office of Analysis for Terrorism, Narcotics and Crime	18	20	20
Office of the Geographer and Global Issues	18	21	21
Deputy Assistant Secretary for Intelligence Policy and Coordination	2	2	2
Office of Intelligence Resources	10	10	10
Office of Intelligence Coordination	6	6	6
Office of Intelligence Operations	6	7	7
Total	305	313	313

== Funding ==
($ in thousands)
Bureau of Intelligence and Research	FY 2007 Actual	FY 2008 Estimate	FY 2009 Request	Increase/Decrease
Policy Formulation	2,104	2,324	2,399	75
Bureau Direction	2,104	2,324	2,399	75
Conduct of Diplomatic Relations	36,580	39,247	40,542	1,295
Intelligence and Research	36,580	39,247	40,542	1,295
Public Diplomacy	3,017	5,411	5,522	111
Public Diplomacy - Program Costs	3,017	5,411	5,522	111
Information Resource Management	5,356	6,474	8,562	2,088
Infrastructure Systems	778	794	803	9
Information Management Security Implementation	143	148	152	4
Voice Communications Programs	635	646	651	5
Corporate Information Systems and Services	4,578	5,680	7,759	2,079
Core Foreign Affairs Systems	4,559	4,681	6,752	2,071
Information Services	19	999	1,007	8
Domestic Administrative Support	2,509	2,719	2,793	74
Domestic Administrative Management	864	880	908	28
Domestic Financial Services	533	555	573	18
Domestic Personnel Services	633	653	669	16
Domestic General Services	479	631	643	12
Other Domestic General Services	479	631	643	12
Total	49,566	56,175	59,818	3,643
