= Dartmouth Conference =

American-Soviet bilateral dialogue

- A meeting of a Dartmouth Task Force in Moscow, 2008
- Status: Active
- Genre: Conferences
- Frequency: Irregularly
- Country: United States – Soviet Union
- Years active: 54 years, 149 days
- Inaugurated: October 28, 1960
- Founder: Norman Cousins
- Most recent: 30 October 2015

The Dartmouth Conference is the longest continuous bilateral dialogue between American and Soviet representatives. The first Dartmouth Conference took place at Dartmouth College in 1961. Subsequent conferences were held through 1990. They were revived in 2014 and continue today. Task forces begun under the auspices of the main conference continued to work after the main conference stopped. The Regional Conflicts Task Force extended the sustained dialogue model, based on the Dartmouth experience, to conflicts in Tajikistan and Nagorno-Karabakh. Dartmouth inspired a number of other dialogues in the former Soviet Union and elsewhere, many of them under the auspices of the Sustained Dialogue Institute and the Kettering Foundation.

== Origin ==
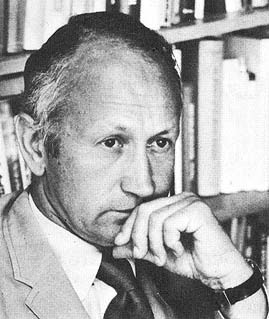
Norman Cousins

The Dartmouth Conference was begun by Norman Cousins, editor of the Saturday Review of Literature, and a founding member of the National Committee for a Sane Nuclear Policy (SANE). Speaking to the presidium of the Soviet Peace Committee in June 1959, he proposed that citizens of the United States and the Soviet Union meet to have informal discussions to widen contacts and to explore areas of contention between them. After discussing the idea with President Eisenhower later that year, Cousins began to organize a meeting between prominent citizens of the two countries.

Together with Philip Mosely, a professor at Columbia, he organized the American side of the conference. The Soviet Peace Committee organized the Soviet side of the first conference and several that followed. The Ford Foundation provided financial support for the American side.

That first conference took place in October 1960 on the campus of Dartmouth College. It began to set the model for the conferences that followed. The discussions covered most issues then important in U.S.-Soviet relations. As later, they were kept off the record.

== Cold War conferences ==
Several things distinguished the Dartmouth Conferences from others that brought Soviets and Americans together. For one, the participants came from a variety of backgrounds. The American participants at the first conference included Agnes DeMille, the choreographer; Walter Rostow, then an aide to John F, Kennedy; Grenville Clark, a prominent lawyer; and Senator William Benton of Connecticut. The Soviet delegation was led by a prominent playwright, Oleksandr Korniychuk and included a chemist, a composer, and an historian. Subsequent conferences included Members of Congress, prominent scholars, industrialists, and former diplomats, but also Marian Anderson and Arthur Miller.

After the first conferences, the Soviet delegations were less diverse, but broadened after Soviet society began to open up after Mikhail Gorbachev became General Secretary of the Communist Party in 1985. On the Soviet side, many of the participants came from policy-oriented institutes like ISKAN, including the Institute of World Economy and International Relations (IMEMO) and the Institute of Oriental Studies.

Discussion of a broad range of subjects was another distinguishing quality of Dartmouth. Whereas the Pugwash Conferences, for example, focused on nuclear disarmament, Dartmouth covered the entire Soviet-American relationship. Arms control and disarmament were prominent, as was the state of the relationship itself. Trade was frequently discussed, as were conflicts in the Third World, a perennial source of discord during the Cold War. Even environmental problems were addressed.

Early on, the conferences were not intended explicitly to influence policy. But this had changed by Dartmouth V in 1969. It did seek to influence policy through meetings with officials, contacts available to participants. The results of the conferences were frequently communicated directly to officials. Each conference came to include meetings with Soviet or American officials. In addition, on a number of occasions, the American participants received official briefings beforehand. Indeed, in 1981, at the beginning of the Reagan Administration, Secretary of State Alexander Haig suggested points that the Americans should emphasize in their discussions at Dartmouth XIII. In addition, members of Congress often took part, as did former officials from the Executive Branch.

Participants like Georgy Arbatov and Yevgeny Primakov were well connected in the Soviet hierarchy. In addition, beginning with the first conference, reports were sent to the higher reaches of the Soviet bureaucracy, as Primakov attested.

Beginning in 1970, the Kettering Foundation took on primarily responsibility for the Dartmouth Conferences on the American side. On the Soviet side, that role was taken by the Soviet Peace Committee, joined by the Institute for US and Canadian Studies (ISKAN), an arrangement that lasted through the end of the Cold War.

Dartmouth XVII was the last conference held before the collapse of the Soviet Union in 1991. After that, the work of Dartmouth continued, but it was done under the auspices of the Regional Conflicts Task Force and the Kettering Foundation. In the new century, the Sustained Dialogue Institute took up much of what the task force had done.

== Revival ==
In 2014, immediately following the outbreak of the Russo-Ukrainian war, U.S.-Russian contacts at the official level ceased. The U.S.–Russia Bilateral Presidential Commission, created in 2009 by Presidents Medvedev and Obama in 2009, was suspended. The U.S. and Europe imposed sanctions on Russia, which imposed its own sanctions in retaliation.

The Kettering Foundation proposed to Vitaly Naumkin and Harold Saunders, co-chairmen of the Task Force on the U.S.–Russia Relationship, that the Dartmouth Conferences be renewed. To assure the effectiveness of these conferences, each side sought and received support for this process at high levels of their governments. In contrast to the more professional backgrounds of those in the task force, participants for this renewed Dartmouth Conference brought together distinguished figures from a wide variety of backgrounds in order to more adequately and persuasively represent public thinking.

Since 2014, the Russian contingent has been co-chaired by Vitaly Naumkin, director of the Institute of Oriental Studies, and Yuri Shafranik, former Energy Minister. The United States body has been led by former U.S. Ambassador to Russia James Franklin Collins.

Dartmouth XVIII convened in November 2014 on the campus of the Kettering Foundation in Dayton, Ohio. After vigorous discussion of the concerns expressed by each side about the actions of the other, the participants focused on identifying steps that could be undertaken jointly to re-inject positive elements into the relationship. A proposal for joint efforts in the medical field is now underway as are several other projects. Meeting with US officials in Washington, DC, following the conference, participants were encouraged by a high State Department official to continue meeting, as "you are the only on-going bilateral discussions today in this critical relationship."

Dartmouth XIX convened in March 2015 in Suzdal, Russia as influential Russian voices called on Russia to abandon efforts to become an integral part of the Euro-Atlantic world. In this context, as the report of the American delegation noted, "Powerful, influential elements in the Russian leadership, as they affirmed and re-affirmed to us, continue to see Russia as a part of the broader Euro-Atlantic community. However, Russia also has its own regional relationships, interests, culture, history, traditions and values for which it demands respect." In their joint report, the participants made recommendations including:

1. reconvening the Bilateral Presidential Commissions,
2. reconvening the NATO-Russia military council,
3. strengthening the conventional arms control regime in Europe,
4. deepening the Lavrov/Kerry dialogue on the Syrian civil war, and
5. creating a contact group to work on common approaches to issues involving the Islamic State of Iraq and the Levant, while possibly sharing ideas on Turkey's role in the conflict.

Dartmouth XX met at Airlie House in Warrenton, Virginia in late October 2015.

== Task forces ==
During the 1970s, the conferences had come to include small meetings focused on particular issues. These had proven to be valuable The idea of establishing task forces to discuss particular issues between conferences was raised at Dartmouth IX in 1975. But it was not until the early 1980s that task forces began to meet regularly. They came to do some of the most important work associated with the Dartmouth Conference.

=== Regional Conflicts Task Force ===
The Regional Conflicts Task Force first met in 1982. It was led by Evgeny Primakov on the Soviet side and Harold Saunders on the American until Primakov left to take a senior position under Gorbachev. His place was taken by Gennadi Chufrin, a scholar from the Institute of Oriental Studies of the Russian Academy of Sciences. The Task Force met regularly until 2001, then worked directly on conflicts in Tajikistan and over Nagorno-Karabakh.

The task force had qualities different from those found at the main conferences. The meetings were more frequent, meeting twice a year until after the collapse of the Soviet Union. The participants changed less often. In Saunders’ estimation, these qualities allowed the discussions to become more analytical and begin a process that he believed could be important in resolving conflict.

Partly because of this, Saunders’ experience on the Regional Conflicts Task Force led him to develop a five-stage approach to international conflict resolution that he called ‘Sustained Dialogue.’ That approach became the basis for several initiatives that stemmed from Dartmouth.

Immediately following the Russo-Georgian War in 2008, the Regional Conflicts Task Force initiated a new series of meetings focusing on addressing key issues in the U.S. - Russia relationship, from Ukraine and Georgia to Afghanistan, Syria, and the Islamic State. Meeting roughly every six months, this task force held the 12th of these new meetings in July 2015, focusing on Afghanistan. It will convene its 13th meeting in January 2016 to discuss interactions between the two countries in Syria and their implications for our bilateral relationship. As with the larger conference, each task force produces a specific set of recommendations that are communicated jointly to the two governments in face-to-face meetings.

=== Other task forces ===
The influence of the Regional Conflicts Task Force came to be essential to Dartmouth, especially after the Cold War ended and the Soviet Union collapsed. But several other task forces met during the 1980s and early 1990s.

The Arms Control Task Force began to meet in April 1983 under the leadership of Paul Doty and Georgy Arbatov. It met a total of 15 times through ten years, ending its work in 1992. The subjects of the discussions mirrored the issued prominent in the official discussions taking place at the time. These included nuclear, chemical, and conventional arms control, denuclearization, missile defense, and security in Europe. A measure of the cooperation the two sides achieved was that, in 1986, Arbatov made copies of the Soviet proposals on arms control that had been made at the Reykjavik Summit. He had been a member of the Soviet delegation that went to Iceland. After the Berlin Wall fell, the discussion of the task force began to include additional topics, such as the expansion of NATO and nuclear proliferation in the face of the dispersal of Soviet weapons among Russia, Ukraine, Belarus, and Kazakhstan.

A Political Relations Task Force met twice in 1986, and twice again in 1988 before its last meeting in January 1989. It was tasked with examining the prospects for the relationship between the two countries and the obstacles to improvement. The changes in Soviet thinking then occurring as perestroika and glasnost gathered steam were prominent in the discussions and helped drive the agenda, but the discussions addressed events in both countries. Meetings in both Washington and Moscow were attended by Members of Congress.

An Economic Relations Task Force only met only once, in 1988. One result of the meeting was that American members of the task force were able to contribute to efforts by the Soviets to draft a law on joint ventures. The Southern Africa Task Force addressed issues in the region in 1984, 1985, and 1987, when the region was an area of conflict important enough in the US-Soviet relationship to warrant separate discussions.

== Dialogues inspired by the Dartmouth Conference ==
Owing largely to the continuing work done by Harold Saunders, the Regional Conflicts Task Force, and the Kettering Foundation, the Dartmouth-inspired model of sustained dialogue was used by groups in several conflicts.

The Regional Conflicts Task Force itself organized the Inter-Tajik Dialogue with participants from both sides of the conflict in an effort to see whether the Sustained Dialogue framework could be used to design a peace process. The members of the task force ended their direct involvement in 2005, but the dialogue continued for several years under other auspices. It also broadened its activity past discussions among the participants to include creation of an NGO, the Public Committee for Democratic Processes (PCDP) designed to create dialogue about everyday problems at local and regional levels.

The Regional Conflicts Task Force continued its experimentation with Sustained Dialogue in the conflicts between Armenia and Azerbaijan over Nagorno-Karabakh. The group, composed of both Azeris and Armenians met in twelve sessions from October 2001 through Dec 2007. They developed a framework for a settlement, which has not been adopted by the two governments, but yet remains a part of the political dialogue in the region.

In 2010, the Carnegie Endowment for International Peace created the Transnistria Conflict Resolution Task Force in partnership with the Friedrich Ebert Foundation, the Institute of World Policy in Ukraine, and the Institute of World Economy and International Relations of the Russian Academy of Sciences. The task force was modeled on Dartmouth. It met four times between 2010 and 2013.

== Sustained Dialogue Institute ==
The International Institute for Sustained Dialogue (later renamed the Sustained Dialogue Institute) was created in 2002 to continue the work begun by the Regional Conflicts Task Force. It picked up where the task force left off with the Inter-Tajik Dialogue and the dialogue over Nagorno-Karabakh. It also created several dialogues on its own, in the Middle East, Southern Africa, and Iraq. It also extended the dialogue to American college campuses through the Sustained Dialogue Campus Network (SDCN).

== The New Dartmouth ==
Early in the new century, the Kettering Foundation tried a different approach to Russian-American dialogue, which was labelled the New Dartmouth. Building on the work it had long done on public deliberation in the United States and used by the National Issues Forums, three groups met to frame the issues in the relationship between the two countries. Then 25 groups across the country used this framework to discuss the relationship.

At the same time, two Russian organizations, Russian Center for Citizenship Education and the Foundation for the Development of Civic Culture, conducted 70 similar forums across Russia. They discussed a contrasting framework developed from the American version. The results of these public deliberations then formed part of the agenda for the new Dartmouth sessions, held between 2003 and August, 2008 when this work found a new home in Russian libraries and the National Issues Forums network, while larger policy issues were again taken up by the re-focused Task Force on Regional Conflicts.

== Locations and dates ==
- Dartmouth I – Hanover, New Hampshire, USA, October 29 – November 4, 1960
- Dartmouth II – Nizhnaya Oreanda, Crimea, USSR, May 21–28, 1961
- Dartmouth III – Andover, Massachusetts, USA, October 21–27, 1962
- Dartmouth IV – Leningrad, USSR, July 21–31, 1964
- Dartmouth V – Rye, New York, USA January 13–18, 1969
- Dartmouth VI – Kyiv, Ukraine, USSR, July 12–16, 1971
- Dartmouth VII – Hanover, New Hampshire, USA, December 2–7, 1972
- Dartmouth VIII – Tbilisi, Georgian SSR, USSR, April 21–24, 1974
- Dartmouth IX – Moscow, USSR, June 3–5, 1975
- Dartmouth X – Rio Rico, Arizona, USA, April 30 – May 2, 1976
- Dartmouth XI – Jūrmala, Latvia, USSR, July 8–13, 1977
- Dartmouth XII – Williamsburg, Virginia, USA, May 3–7, 1979
- Dartmouth Leadership Conference – Bellagio, Italy, May 22–26, 1980
- Dartmouth XIII – Moscow, USSR, November 16–19, 1981
- Dartmouth XIV – Hanover, New Hampshire, USA, May 14–17, 1984
- Dartmouth XV – Baku, Azerbaijan, USSR, May 13–17, 1986
- Dartmouth XVI – Austin, Texas, USA, April 25–29, 1989
- Dartmouth XVII – Leningrad, USSR, July 22–27, 1990
- Dartmouth XVIII – Dayton, Ohio, November 3–7, 2014
- Dartmouth XIX – Suzdal, Russia, March 23–26, 2015
- Dartmouth XX - Airlie House, Virginia, and Washington DC, October 27–30, 2015
- Dartmouth XXI - Zavidovo, Russia, May 2016
- Dartmouth XXII - Aspen Wye Plantation, Maryland, and Washington DC, November 1–3, 2016

== Partial list of notable participants ==
Notable participants of the conferences include:

- Georgi Arbatov
- William Benton
- Landrum Bolling
- Zbigniew Brzezinski
- Antonia Chayes
- Grenville Clark
- Norman Cousins
- Agnes DeMille
- Paul Doty
- Buckminster Fuller
- John Kenneth Galbraith
- James Gavin
- Albert Gore
- Anatoly Gromyko
- William G. Hyland
- David C. Jones
- Sergei Karaganov
- Oleksandr Korniychuk
- Andrei Kozyrev
- David Mathews
- Arthur Miller
- Vitaly Naumkin
- Evgeni Primakov
- David Rockefeller
- Walter Rostow
- Roald Sagdeev
- Harold Saunders
- Brent Scowcroft
- Yuri Shafranik
- Helmut Sonnenfeldt
- Charles Yost
- Yuri Zhukov

== See also ==
- Pugwash Conferences
- List of anti-war organizations
- List of peace activists
- Track II diplomacy
