= Sustained Dialogue Institute =

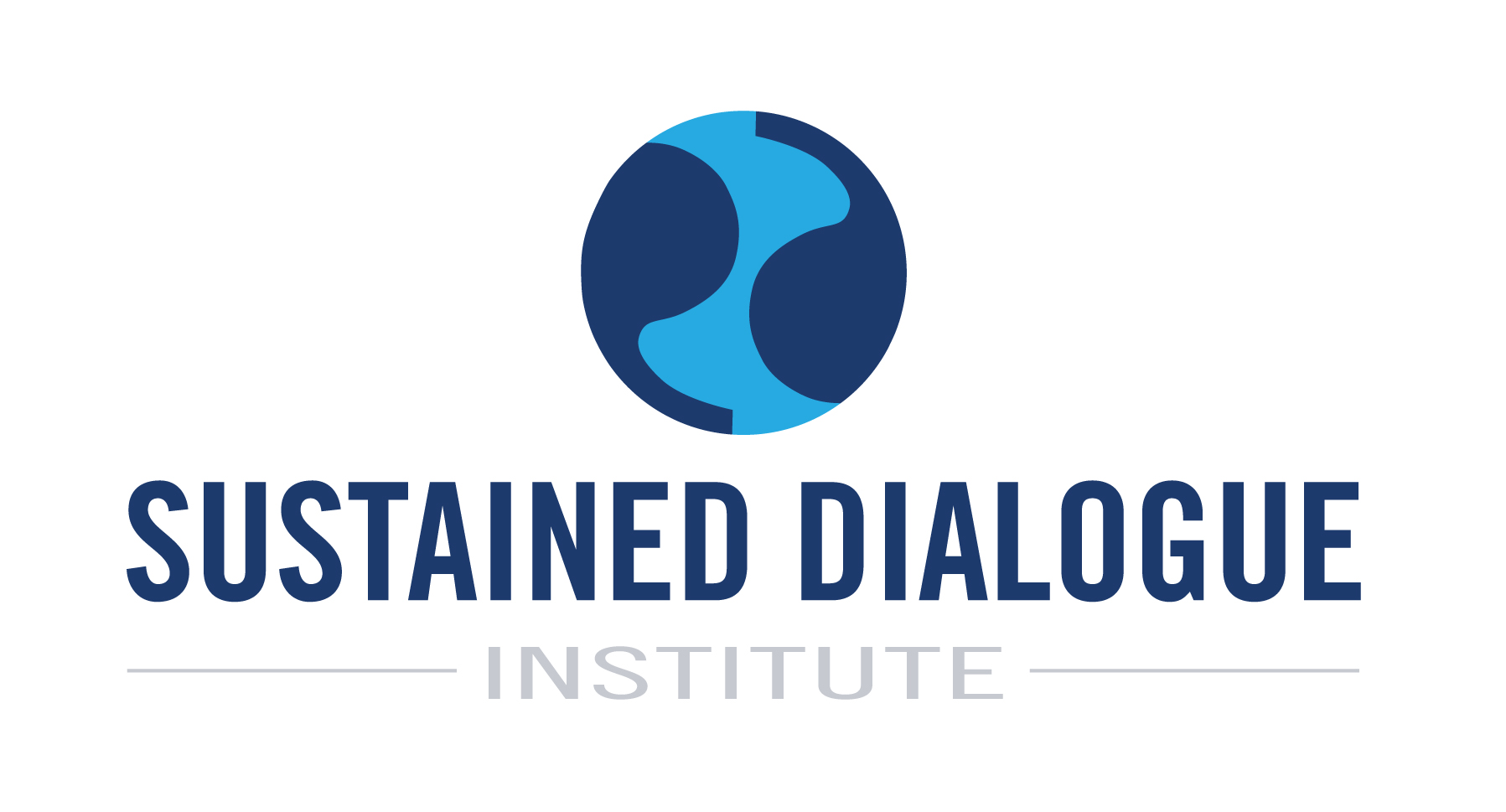
The Sustained Dialogue Institute logo

The Sustained Dialogue Institute, founded by Harold H. Saunders and incorporated in 2002, is an independent tax-exempt 501 (c)(3) organization formed in collaboration with the Kettering Foundation. The institute provides trainings, consulting, and technical support for the Sustained Dialogue process on campuses, workplaces, and communities around the globe. Sustained Dialogue is a system for transforming conflictual or destructive relationships, and implementing long-term change, developed from Hal Saunders' experience facilitating peace processes in the Middle East as a United States diplomat.

The Sustained Dialogue Institute houses the Sustained Dialogue System process and the Sustained Dialogue Campus Network.

== Sustained Dialogue System ==
Sustained dialogue is a process for transforming deep-rooted human conflicts. Former United States Assistant Secretary of State for Near East Affairs Hal Saunders developed the process, which is rooted in his experience in facilitating peace processes, including the Camp David Accords and the Iran Hostage Crisis. During the Cold War, the Sustained Dialogue System served as the underlying philosophy of the Dartmouth Conferences, the longest-running citizen dialogue between U.S. and Russian (formerly Soviet) citizens. The Dartmouth Conference worked to open channels to transmit and clarify perspectives when communication among Russian (formerly Soviet) and United States officials broke down.Sustained Dialogue was also used as a framework in the Inter-Tajik Dialogue from 1993 until 2000.

== Sustained Dialogue Campus Network ==
The Sustained Dialogue Campus Network (SDCN), a project of the Sustained Dialogue Institute founded in 2003, is a training and consulting hub for the international network of campuses running Sustained Dialogues. SDCN began during Saunders' time on the board of trustees at Princeton University. Saunders and Princeton University undergraduates David Tukey and Teddy Nemeroff worked together to apply the Sustained Dialogue methodology to addressing race-based conflicts at Princeton, and their collaboration spread to the University of Virginia, and developed into the Campus Network.

Housed by the Sustained Dialogue Institute, SDCN involves students from dozens of campuses in twelve countries who work to improve intergroup relations and campus climate. The focus of any Sustained Dialogue program is relationship building across lines of difference and facilitating honest dialogue between students, faculty, staff, and administrators. SDCN trains campus communities in facilitation and Sustained Dialogue moderation, as well as inclusive leadership skills and conflict resolution. Active programs send students to annual dialogue conferences at local chapters or at SDCN headquarters in Washington, D.C.

Participating schools
Addis Ababa University
Ahfad University for Women
Allegheny College
Appalachian State University
Auburn University
Augustana College
Beloit College
Case Western Reserve University
Cleveland State University
Cornell College
Cuyahoga Community College
Deerfield Academy
Denison University
Dickinson College
Duke University
Elon University
Haramaya University
Harvard University
Hollins University
Islamic University (Uganda)
Jimma University
Lawrence University
Macalester College
Makerere University
Montana State University
National University of Science and Technology (Zimbabwe)
Northwestern University
Makerere University
Notre Dame University
Notre Dame University
Princeton University
Roger Williams University
Sonoma State University
St. John Fisher College
St. Olaf College
Susquehanna University
Tec de Monterrey – Campus Chiapas
Tec de Monterrey – Campus Ciudad de México
Tec de Monterrey – Campus Ciudad Juárez
Tec de Monterrey – Campus Cuernavaca
Tec de Monterrey – Campus Monterrey
Tec de Monterrey – Campus Santa Fe
Ohio State University
University of Alabama — Tuscaloosa
University of California at Davis
University of Cape Town (South Africa)
University of Denver
University of Georgia
University of Khartoum (Sudan)
University of Nebraska at Omaha
University of North Carolina, Charlotte
University of North Carolina, Wilmington
University of Tampa
University of Virginia

== National Dialogue Awards ==
Each year, the Sustained Dialogue Institute awards a person whose life has "been powerfully marked by the principles and values of Sustained Dialogue." In addition to the primary awardee, SDI selects at least two members of the Sustained Dialogue Campus network to receive the award.

Year	Primary Awardee	SDCN Awardees
2016	Ruth Bader Ginsburg, associate Supreme Court Justice	Student Don Williams, Alum Breanna Swims
2015	Senator George J. Mitchell, Evolent Health	Brittany Chung (student), Lane McLelland (advisor), Taylor Sawyer (alumn)
2014	Rep. John Lewis, Georgia Congressman & Michele Norris, NPR radio journalist	Lital Firestone (student, Jazzy Johnson (student), Aaron Jenkins (community member)

== Impact ==
A study published by the Journal of Peace Research showed that Sustained Dialogue had a positive effect on decreasing mistrust and increasing the level of trust between people of different ethnic origins. However, participation in the dialogue program increased the sense of importance of ethnic identities as well as the perception of being ethnically discriminated and had no significant effect on game behavior.

== Awards ==
- Characters Unite Award from the USA Network and Comcast, "2010"
- The Walter and Leonore Annenberg Award for Excellence in Diplomacy from the American Academy of Diplomacy, "November 30, 3010"

== See also ==
- Dialogue
- Intergroup dialogue
