= Oksana Potapova =

Ukrainian feminist, peace researcher, and activist

- Born: c. 1984
- Occupation: Researcher

Oksana Potapova (Ukrainian: Оксана Потапова) is a Ukrainian feminist, peacebuilding researcher and activist.

== Childhood and education ==
Potapova was born in 1983 or 1984 (age 42–43) and describes her origin as Eastern Ukraine. She started studying for a master's degree in gender, peace and security in 2020 at the London School of Economics.

== Activism and research ==
In 2014, Potapova founded Theatre for Dialogue, a non-governmental organization that works with women affected by the war in Donbas, developing communication among them and helping them to defend their rights nationally and internationally. The aims of Theatre for Dialogue include supporting and providing publicity for the efforts of the "huge volunteer movement of women organizing humanitarian action and community dialogue" in relation to the Donbas war.

Potapova stated that monitoring and enforcement of pandemic controls during the COVID-19 pandemic shifted policing away from responding to incidents of domestic violence in Ukraine. Based on interviews with five human rights activists from different regions of Ukraine, Potapova found in May 2020 that the pandemic affected women more than men, with women taking on more responsibility for child care, teaching and household management than men. Other concerns for Ukrainian women during the pandemic were job losses and postponement of domestic violence court cases.

== Views ==
=== Ukrainian feminism ===
In 2019, Potapova stated that the term "gender equality" was no longer taboo in Ukraine, but laws and political will to promote gender equality were weak, and the war in Donbas exacerbated the reality of discrimination against women.

=== Peace processes ===
Potapova argues that women's participation in peace processes differs from that of men, since the violence that is to be reduced involves both the violence of the armed conflict and violence against women more generally. She also sees intersectionality as important, so that not only women, but also discriminated minorities are involved in peace negotiations.

In December 2021, Potapova expressed support for the newly launched OSCE Networking Platform for Women Leaders including Peacebuilders and Mediators. She argues that women's organisations should be involved in peacebuilding.

Potapova argued for replacing military public debate about being "at war" and the "enemy" by a "feminist agenda" of "care, support, solidarity and equality". She called for women to be involved in decision-making processes immediately rather than only after crises. Potapova argued that women's advocacy was becoming more effective in Ukraine by the use of research data and analysis.

=== Care economy ===
Potapova argues that the COVID-19 pandemic brought attention to the role of the care economy, part of the informal economy, "childcare, motherhood, caring for the elderly, caring for the sick, activism", which she argued should become a priority over the "profit-driven economy".
