= Gennady Sizov =

Soviet and Russian diplomat (1941–2021)

- Геннадий Сизов

Ambassador of Russia to Bolivia
- In office 30 June 1998 – 11 July 2003
- Preceded by: Yury Nosenko
- Succeeded by: Vladimir Kulikov

Personal details
- Born: 9 September 1941 Aleksin, Tula Oblast, Russian SFSR, Soviet Union
- Died: 14 October 2021 (aged 80)
- Resting place: Federal Military Memorial Cemetery
- Education: Patrice Lumumba Peoples' Friendship University; Diplomatic Academy of the Ministry of Foreign Affairs
- Awards: Order of Friendship; Medal "For Courage"

Gennady Vasilyevich Sizov (Russian: Геннадий Васильевич Сизов; 9 September 1941 – 14 October 2021) was a Soviet and Russian diplomat. He served in various diplomatic roles from 1971 onwards, and was ambassador of Russia to Bolivia between 1998 and 2003.

Sizov initially trained and worked as a mechanic and technical engineer, before studying at the Patrice Lumumba Peoples' Friendship University, and joining the Soviet Ministry of Foreign Affairs in 1971. He began a long association with Latin American countries, with his first overseas posting being to Ecuador. In the following years he served in the Soviet diplomatic missions to Uruguay and Cuba, with intervening periods in the Latin American Department in the ministry's central apparatus.

Sizov remained with the foreign ministry after the dissolution of the Soviet Union in 1991, now the Russian Ministry of Foreign Affairs, and was minister-counselor to Tajikistan between 1994 and 1997. This period included the Tajikistani Civil War and the efforts to establish the Inter-Tajik Dialogue, and Sizov received several awards for his diplomatic service during this time. He was appointed ambassador of Russia to Bolivia in 1998, holding the position until 2003, and after a brief spell as deputy director of the Foreign Ministry's Security Department, he retired in 2004 with the diplomatic rank of Ambassador Extraordinary and Plenipotentiary.

== Early life and career ==
Sizov was born on 9 September 1941 in Aleksin, Tula Oblast, then part of the Russian Soviet Federative Socialist Republic, in the Soviet Union. He studied at the Kaluga Technical School of Railway Transport, graduating in 1959 and beginning a career as a mechanic, working in the No. 1 tunnel-bridge detachment in Tuapse, Krasnodar Krai. He served in the Soviet Armed Forces between 1960 and 1963, and then became a senior design technician at the Tula Arms Factory.

== Diplomatic career ==
Sizov studied international economic relations at Patrice Lumumba Peoples' Friendship University, graduating in 1970 and joining the Soviet Ministry of Foreign Affairs in 1971. He was assigned to work on Latin American countries, with his first posting to Ecuador as an attaché beginning later in 1971. This lasted until 1976, when he returned to work in the Latin American Department in the ministry's central apparatus. Several other postings to Latin American countries followed, to Uruguay between 1978 and 1982, and to Cuba between 1984 and 1990. He had taken the advanced training courses for leading diplomats at the Diplomatic Academy of the Ministry of Foreign Affairs in 1983.

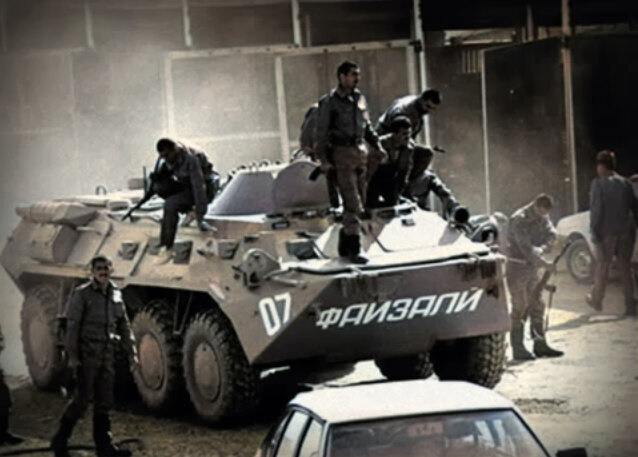
Military forces during the Tajikistani Civil War. Sizov was based in the country during the conflict.

Sizov remained with the foreign ministry, now the Russian Ministry of Foreign Affairs, after the dissolution of the Soviet Union in 1991, and was minister-counselor to Tajikistan between 1994 and 1997. He had been appointed to the diplomatic rank of Envoy Extraordinary and Plenipotentiary Second Class on 20 June 1994, and then to the rank of Envoy Extraordinary and Plenipotentiary First Class on 30 December 1995. For his service as charge d'affaires during this period, which included the Tajikistani Civil War and the Inter-Tajik Dialogue, he was awarded the Medal "For Courage" on 21 June 1996, for "services to the state, a great contribution to the conduct of foreign policy and ensuring the national interests of Russia, courage and dedication shown in the performance of official duties". Between 1997 and 1998 he was serving as chief adviser to the Latin American Department.

On 30 June 1998, Sizov became the ambassador of Russia to Bolivia, a post he held until 11 July 2003. He was promoted to the rank of Ambassador Extraordinary and Plenipotentiary during this posting, on 30 November 2001. He was appointed deputy director of the Foreign Ministry's Security Department on his return, before his retirement in 2004. In addition to his native Russian, Sizov spoke English and Spanish.

== Death ==
Sizov died on 14 October 2021, at the age of 80. He was buried in the Federal Military Memorial Cemetery on 19 October 2021. His obituary by the Russian Ministry of Foreign Affairs described him as "not only an experienced diplomat, but also a responsible worker, and a sympathetic and benevolent person." In addition to the award of the Medal "For Courage", Sizov had been awarded the Order of Friendship on 1 July 1997, for "active participation in resolving issues of inter-Tajik settlement", and the medal "In Commemoration of the 850th Anniversary of Moscow" in 1998.
