= Peace process =

Diplomatic end to war

A peace process is the set of sociopolitical negotiations, agreements and actions that aim to solve a specific armed conflict.

== Origin of the term ==
U.S. diplomat Harold H. Saunders of the Sustained Dialogue Institute coined the term "peace process" during U.S. shuttle diplomacy following the 1973 Arab-Israeli War, describing it as "a mixture of politics, diplomacy, changing relationships, negotiation, mediation, and dialogue in both official and unofficial arenas."

== Definitions ==
Prior to an armed conflict occurring, peace processes can include the prevention of an intrastate or inter-state dispute from escalating into military conflict. The United Nations Department of Peace Operations (UNDPO) terms the prevention of disputes from escalating into armed conflicts as conflict prevention. In 2007, the United Nations Secretary-General's Policy Committee classed both initial prevention of an armed conflict and prevention of the repeat of a solved conflict as peacebuilding.

Izumi Wakugawa, advisor to the Japan-based International Peace Cooperation Program, categorises these processes into two stages: the ceasing of armed conflict and the processes of sociological reorganisation.

=== Ceasing of armed conflict ===
Non-military processes for stopping an armed conflict stage are generally classed as peacemaking. Military methods by globally organised military forces of stopping a local armed conflict are typically classed as peace enforcement.

=== Reorganisation ===
The prevention of the repeat of a solved conflict (as well as the preventing of an armed conflict from occurring at all) is usually classed as peacebuilding. UNDPO defines peacebuilding to include "measures [that] address core issues that effect the functioning of society and the State". The use of neutral military forces to sustain ceasefires during this phase, typically by United Nations peacekeeping forces, can be referred to as peacekeeping.

=== Overlapping definitions ===
The terms peacemaking, peacekeeping and peacebuilding tend to be used broadly, with their meanings defined in terms of the phases of various peace process mechanisms blurring and overlapping in practice.

== Institutions ==
The construction of international institutions, especially during the twentieth century, has to a large degree been motivated by the desire to provide a broad global context of peacebuilding. That includes the League of Nations and the United Nations and regional institutions such as the European Union. Institutions involved in encouraging or overseeing some of the steps in specific peace processes include the United Nations Department of Peace Operations.

== Elements: terminology ==
The Peace Accords Matrix of the Kroc Institute for International Peace Studies at the University of Notre Dame, United States, uses the term "provisions" to describe specific elements of peace processes in intrastate conflicts. This includes a list of 51 different elements, including amnesties; ceasefires; arms embargoes; releases of political prisoners; truth and reconciliation commissions; and reforms of the constitution, or of military, police, judicial or educational institutions or of the media.

Other specific elements of peace processes include exchanges, confidence-building measures, humanitarian corridors, peace treaties and transitional justice.

== Criticism ==
Edward Luttwak argues that conventional wars should not be interrupted before they could burn themselves out and the preconditions for a long-lasting peace are established. Stable peace settlement is possible only with the exhaustion of belligerents or the decisive victory of one side. "Hopes for military success must fade for accommodation to become more attractive than further combat," but premature ceasefires prevent belligerents from exhaustion and let them rearm their forces. That in turn prolongs war and leads to further killings and destruction.

== Women's participation ==
According to Neville Melvin Gertze of Namibia, speaking at an October 2019 meeting of the United Nations Security Council, peace agreements that are the result of negotiations including women are 35 percent more likely to last at least 15 years than those which are the result of men-only negotiations. At the same meeting, United Nations Secretary-General António Guterres stated that women were excluded from peace processes, attacks against women human rights defenders had increased, and only a "tiny percentage" of funding for peacebuilding was given to women's organisations.

== See also ==
- Arab–Israeli normalization
- De-escalation
- List of peace processes
- Peace
