= Kuala Lumpur Peace Accord =

2025 peace agreement between Cambodia and Thailand

Joint Declaration by the Prime Minister of the Kingdom of Cambodia and the Prime Minister of the Kingdom of Thailand on the Outcomes of Their Meeting in Kuala Lumpur, Malaysia
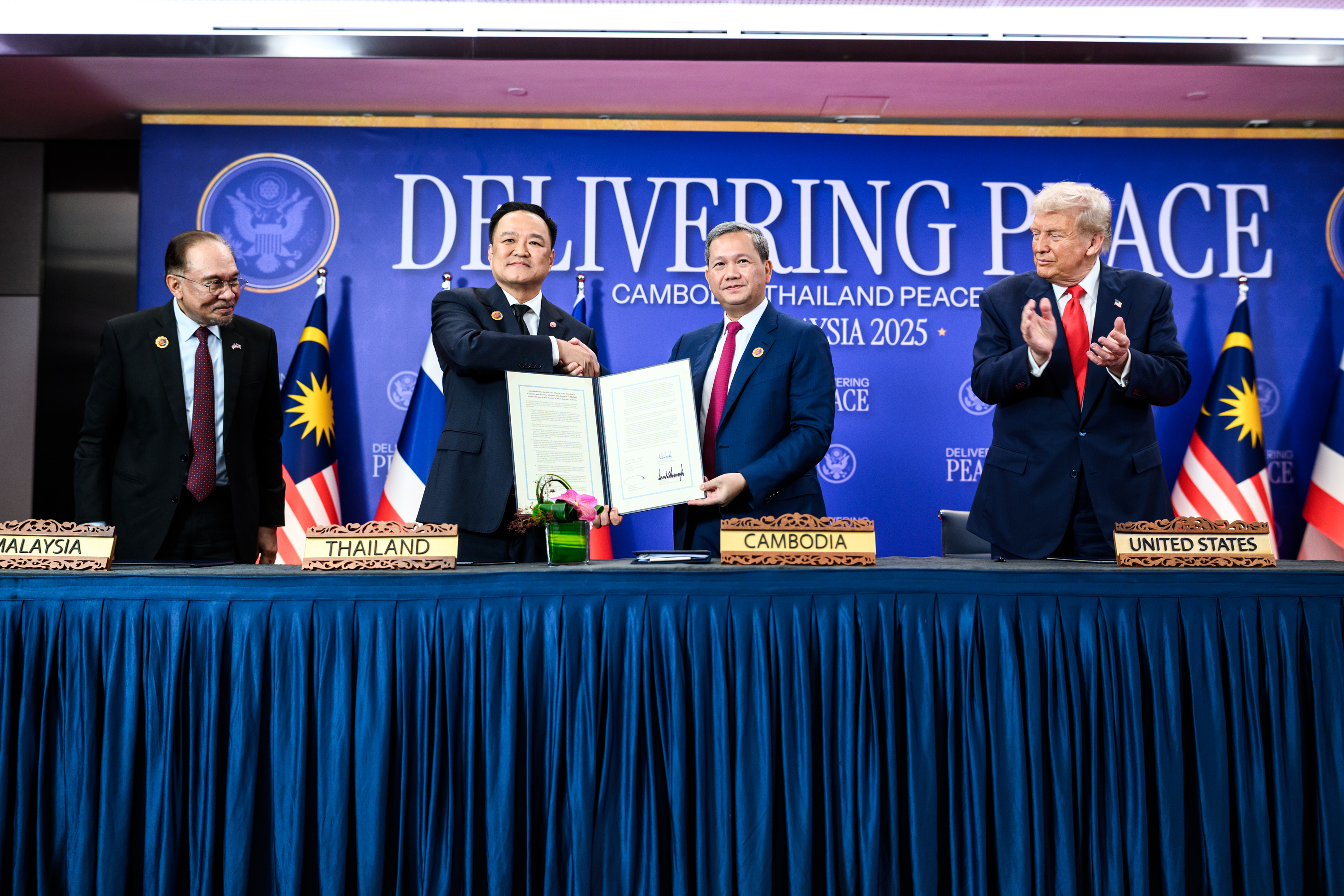
- Signing ceremony on the sidelines of the 47th ASEAN Summit in Kuala Lumpur, 26 October 2025
- Type: Peace treaty
- Context: 2025 Cambodian–Thai border crisis
- Signed: 26 October 2025
- Location: Kuala Lumpur, Malaysia
- Expiry: 10 November 2025
- Mediators: Malaysia; United States
- Signatories: Hun Manet; Anutin Charnvirakul; Anwar Ibrahim; Donald Trump
- Parties: Cambodia; Thailand
- Depositary: Ministry of Foreign Affairs of Malaysia
- Language: English

The Kuala Lumpur Peace Accord (officially the Joint Declaration by the Prime Minister of the Kingdom of Cambodia and the Prime Minister of the Kingdom of Thailand on the Outcomes of Their Meeting in Kuala Lumpur, Malaysia) was a peace agreement signed on 26 October 2025, on the sidelines of the 47th ASEAN Summit at the Kuala Lumpur Convention Centre in Kuala Lumpur, Malaysia.

The accord was reached in the aftermath of an escalating border crisis along the Cambodia–Thailand border, which had seen armed clashes, landmine incidents, and heightened military deployments on both sides. The crisis raised regional and international concerns about stability in Southeast Asia and underscored the urgency of diplomatic intervention.

In the declaration, Cambodian prime minister Hun Manet and Thai prime minister Anutin Charnvirakul affirmed their "unwavering commitment to peace and security between our two countries" and reiterated a pledge to "refrain from the threat or use of force, and to seek peaceful settlement of disputes."

The accord also outlined several concrete measures aimed at stabilizing the Cambodia–Thailand border region, including the establishment of an ASEAN Observer Team (AOT) to monitor the implementation of a ceasefire, the withdrawal of heavy weapons from border areas under observation, joint humanitarian demining operations, the restoration of confidence-building measures and diplomatic relations, and the prompt release of prisoners of war (POWs) by Thailand as a demonstration of goodwill.

The declaration was witnessed by Malaysian prime minister Anwar Ibrahim and United States president Donald Trump, underscoring regional and international support for the agreement. The accord marked a critical step toward de-escalating the border crisis and promoting long-term peace and stability between Thailand and Cambodia. However, clashes resumed between the two countries just two months later on 8 December.

== Background ==
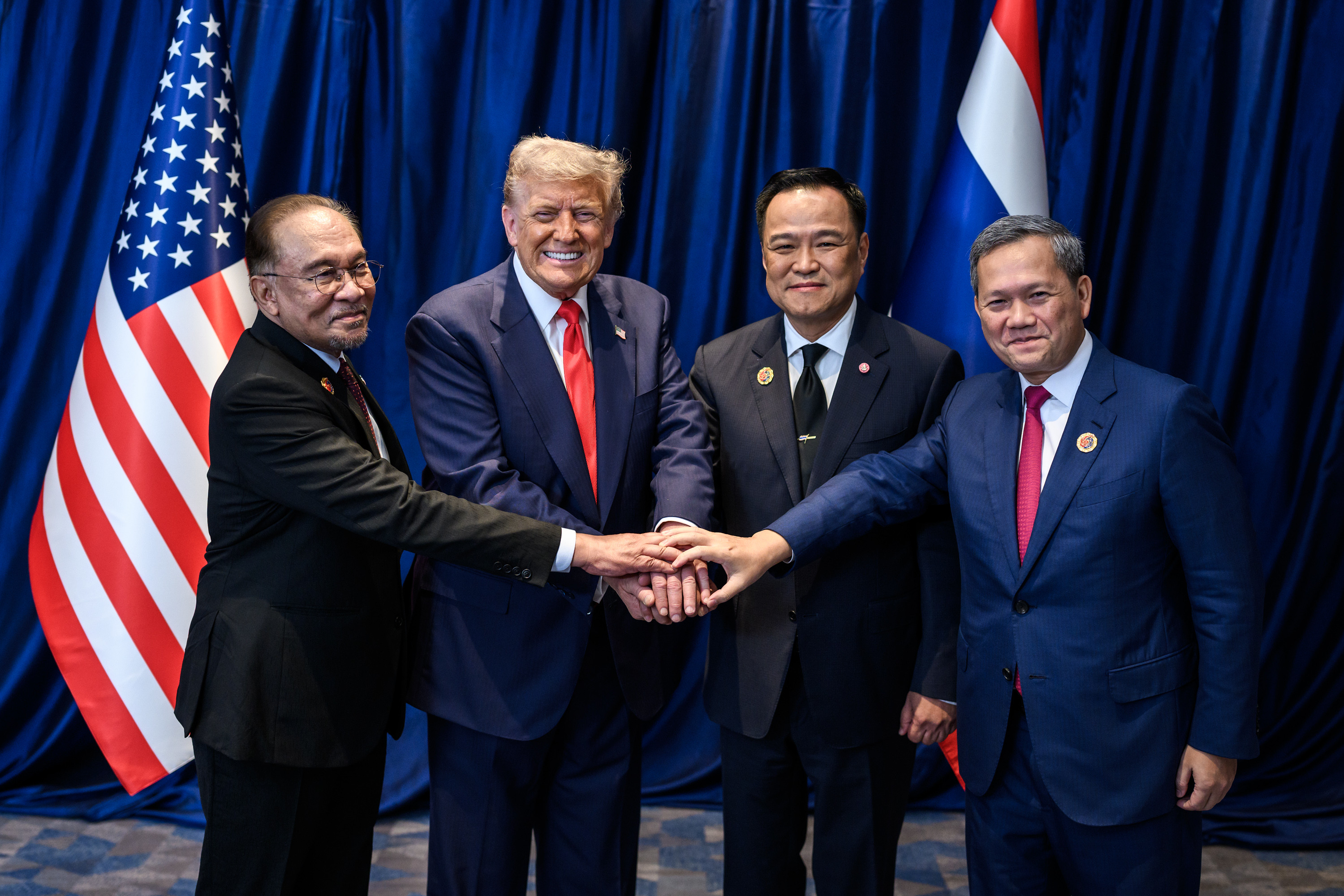
Malaysian prime minister Anwar Ibrahim, U.S. president Donald Trump, Thai prime minister Anutin Charnvirakul and Cambodian prime minister Hun Manet after the signing of the Kuala Lumpur Peace Accords, 26 October 2025.

Tensions along the Cambodia–Thailand border escalated sharply in July 2025, resulting in the heaviest fighting between the two countries in over a decade. The conflict involved heavy artillery exchanges and airstrikes, which displaced an estimated 130,000 people and caused at least three dozen civilian deaths.

After several days of hostilities, Thailand and Cambodia agreed to an immediate ceasefire on 28 July 2025 during emergency talks in Putrajaya, Malaysia. This truce, sometimes referred to as the Putrajaya Agreement, was brokered with the support of ASEAN, Malaysia (then serving as ASEAN chair), and international representatives from the United States and China.

Following the ceasefire, the two countries convened a General Border Committee (GBC) and a Regional Border Committee (RBC) to consolidate the truce, restore communication channels, and address ongoing security and humanitarian issues along the border.

The United Nations secretary-general, António Guterres, welcomed the ceasefire and later commended ASEAN's ongoing mediation efforts to maintain peace and stability in the border region.

== Negotiation and mediation ==
Formal negotiations to transform the July ceasefire into a durable settlement were held in Kuala Lumpur in late October 2025, coinciding with the ASEAN Summit. Malaysia hosted the bilateral sessions, with Malaysian prime minister Anwar Ibrahim presiding as facilitator. Observers from the United States attended the closing session, reflecting Washington's diplomatic involvement in the crisis since July.

According to the joint declaration, the talks concluded with an agreement "in the presence of and supported by" both Anwar and U.S. president Donald Trump. ASEAN officials described the outcome as a milestone for "regional de-escalation and the re-establishment of normal diplomatic relations". The United Nations welcomed the October joint declaration as consolidating the July ceasefire.

The accord followed months of technical consultations between the Cambodian and Thai defence ministries regarding verification procedures for an observer mission and the modalities of troop withdrawal.

== Terms of the accord ==
The Joint Declaration included political, military, and humanitarian commitments:

- Principles of peace and non-use of force: Both sides reaffirmed their adherence to the principles of the UN Charter and the ASEAN Charter, undertaking to resolve disputes peacefully and respect existing boundaries.
- Implementation of prior border agreements: The parties reconfirmed the validity of mechanisms such as the General Border Committee, the Regional Border Committee, and the Joint Boundary Commission as frameworks for dispute settlement.
- ASEAN Observer Team (AOT): A Terms of Reference for an ASEAN Observer Team was signed concurrently with the declaration. The AOT, composed of personnel from ASEAN member states, is mandated to "ensure the full and effective implementation of the ceasefire" and to report its findings to ASEAN.
- Military de-escalation: Under AOT supervision, both sides agreed to withdraw heavy and destructive weapons from border areas and return them to regular bases. Military liaison teams were tasked with drafting a detailed action plan and timeline.
- Information restraint: The parties committed to avoid "false information, accusations, allegations, and harmful rhetoric," whether through official or unofficial channels, in order to reduce tensions.
- Confidence-building and diplomatic restoration: Immediate implementation of joint civil-military programmes and border coordination was mandated, with a stated goal of restoring full diplomatic relations between the two countries.
- Humanitarian de-mining: Joint operations are to be conducted to remove landmines and unexploded ordnance "to protect civilian lives and contribute to socio-economic development."
- Cessation of hostilities and prisoner release: The declaration provides that, upon completion of de-escalation measures, both sides will recognise the cessation of active hostilities. Thailand undertook to "promptly release the prisoners of war" captured during the July conflict as a confidence-building step.
- Transnational-crime cooperation: The governments agreed to strengthen coordination on issues such as trafficking, illegal arms trade, and smuggling across the border region.

== Signatories and witnesses ==
The accord was signed on 26 October 2025 in Kuala Lumpur, and was issued in quadruplicate in the English language.

=== Signatories ===
- Hun Manet, Prime Minister of the Kingdom of Cambodia
- Anutin Charnvirakul, Prime Minister of the Kingdom of Thailand

=== Witnesses ===
- Anwar Ibrahim, Prime Minister of Malaysia
- Donald Trump, President of the United States of America

== Peace agreement suspension ==
On November 10, 2025, several Thai soldiers on a routine patrol near the border in Sisaket province were injured from a landmine. This event led Thailand to accuse Cambodia that this was a newly placed landmine and it suspended all progress on the peace agreement until Cambodia proves it will not show hostility. Cambodia denied the accusations and reaffirmed its commitment to the peace accord, but border tensions remain unresolved. On 8 December 2025, Thailand and Cambodia resumed fighting after both sides accused each other of breaking the ceasefire.

== See also ==
- List of peace processes
