= ASEAN Observer Team =

ASEAN peacekeeping and monitoring force

- Founded: 26 October 2025; 10 months ago
- Countries: ASEAN: Brunei; Cambodia; Indonesia; Laos; Malaysia; Myanmar; Philippines; Singapore; Thailand; Timor-Leste; Vietnam; Partner nations: Japan
- Type: Peacekeeping
- Role: Observer; Peacekeeper; Mine clearance; Diplomatic support

The ASEAN Observer Team (abbr.: AOT) is a multinational peacekeeping and monitoring force established as a regional initiative by member states of the Association of Southeast Asian Nations (ASEAN). Operating independently of the United Nations, the AOT is structured as a rotating force. Leadership and command responsibilities are transferred annually to the ASEAN member state currently holding the chairmanship and hosting the ASEAN Summit for that calendar year.

The composition of the force consists primarily of personnel drawn from the chairmanship nation's military. However, the AOT also integrates military personnel from other ASEAN member states and invited non-ASEAN partner nations.

For the 2026 term, the Armed Forces of the Philippines (AFP) assumed responsibility for the AOT, succeeding the Malaysian Armed Forces, which held the mandate throughout 2025. While the specific commander for the 2026 rotation has not been formally named, the position is designated to be held by a two-star general from the AFP.

== History ==
=== 2025 Cambodian–Thai border crisis ===
The AOT originated during the 2025 Cambodian–Thai border crisis, which has remained in an unconditional ceasefire phase since July 2025. To monitor compliance with the ceasefire agreement, Malaysia, acting as the ASEAN Chair for 2025, deployed an initial ten-man detachment from the Malaysian Armed Forces to the border region. This small unit served as the pioneer element for what would become the formal AOT structure.

The AOT was officially established on 26 October 2025 during the 47th ASEAN Summit and the Kuala Lumpur Peace Accord, held in Kuala Lumpur. The founding ceremony was witnessed by the ASEAN heads of state and the President of the United States, Donald Trump.

Under the initial leadership of Colonel Mohd Farid Mohd Yusop, the team maintained a continuous presence along the border. The size of the AOT was expanded in phases, incorporating military personnel from various other ASEAN member states to strengthen the monitoring mission. This Malaysian-led phase of the operation lasted for seven months, beginning in July 2025, before command responsibilities were transferred to the Armed Forces of the Philippines in February 2026.

=== Expansion and inclusion of non-ASEAN nations ===
The operational scope of the AOT continued to grow as Japan became the first non-ASEAN partner nation to offer assistance. Japan has participated in the mission since August 2025, providing donated security and surveillance systems for the team's operational use. This was made under Official Security Assistance (OSA).

In December 2025, following discussions between Prime Minister Anwar Ibrahim and the United States, ASEAN incorporated American satellite monitoring systems into the mission's framework. This high-altitude surveillance provides the AOT with real-time imagery to support ground-level observations and ensure greater transparency regarding troop movements along the frontier.

Following the transition to Philippine leadership, General Romeo S. Brawner Jr., the AFP Chief of Staff, announced plans to enlarge the AOT presence. This expansion involves the deployment of peacekeeping personnel on both sides of the Cambodia–Thailand border. Under this proposed structure, the AOT will be commanded by a two-star general, supported by a one-star general stationed on each side of the frontier.

== Duties and responsibilities ==
Drawing from the operational protocols established during the mission at the Cambodia–Thailand border, the core duties and responsibilities of the AOT include:

- Ceasefire monitoring: Ensuring all parties adhere to the terms of the implementation of the ceasefire agreement.
- Disarmament oversight: Supervising the withdrawal of heavy weaponry from designated border areas under observation.
- Mine clearance: Coordinating and conducting joint humanitarian demining operations to secure contested zones.
- Diplomatic support: Facilitating the restoration of confidence-building measures and the renewal of diplomatic relations.
- Prisoner exchange: Overseeing and managing the release and repatriation of prisoners of war.

== Member nations ==
Under the current operational framework, the member state holding the ASEAN chairmanship provides the majority of AOT personnel, while other member states contribute smaller contingents to complete the force. A standing exemption exists for member states directly involved in an active conflict; such nations are not required to deploy personnel to the AOT.

The following nations are eligible to assign military personnel to the AOT:

ASEAN member states

- Brunei
- Cambodia (Note: Cambodia and Thailand are currently exempt from assigning military personnel to the AOT, as the mission's primary objective is the monitoring of the border crisis between these two nations.)
- Indonesia
- Laos
- Malaysia
- Myanmar
- Philippines
- Singapore
- Thailand
- Timor-Leste
- Vietnam

Partner nations

- Japan
- United States

=== Lead nation ===
The leadership of the AOT rotates annually, aligning with the national military of the state holding the ASEAN chairmanship.

The following table outlines the command periods and the respective lead nations:

AOT Lead nations
Lead Nation	Terms	Primary Command
Malaysia	2025/2026	Malaysian Armed Forces
Philippines	2026/2027	Armed Forces of the Philippines

== Deployments and missions ==
The AOT exclusively addresses conflicts occurring within the ASEAN region. The following list details the completed and ongoing deployments involving the force:

=== 2025 Cambodian–Thai border crisis ===
The territorial dispute between Cambodia and Thailand stems from historical ambiguities regarding boundary demarcations established under the 1904 and 1907 agreements. These treaties sought to define the frontier between the Kingdom of Siam (present-day Thailand) and the French Third Republic in French Indochina. The maps and survey documents produced by French colonial authorities were frequently imprecise, resulting in overlapping claims over strategic highland areas and mountain passes.

Tensions regarding these borders have escalated periodically since the 1950s, leading to several significant armed confrontations. The most recent of these developments is the 2025 Cambodian–Thai border crisis, which necessitated the current AOT deployment to oversee the cessation of hostilities.

== See also ==
- United Nations Military Observer
- International Monitoring Team, a similar multinational organization based in Mindanao
