= Annenberg Award for Excellence in Diplomacy =

The Walter and Leonore Annenberg Award for Excellence in Diplomacy is an annual award given by the American Academy of Diplomacy in recognition of an individual or group who has made exemplary contributions to the field of American diplomacy. Recipients of the award are recommended by the Academy's Executive Committee and approved by the AAD Board of Directors.

| Name | Year | Description |
|---|---|---|
| Marie Yovanovitch | 2023 | U.S. Ambassador to Ukraine |
| Thomas R. Pickering | 2022 | Under Secretary of State for Political Affairs, U.S. Ambassador to the United Nations, U.S. Ambassador to Russia, U.S. Ambassador to India, U.S. Ambassador to Israel, U.S. Ambassador to El Salvador, U.S. Ambassador to Nigeria, U.S. Ambassador to Jordan |
| Foreign Service & Civil Service Personnel of the U.S. Government Who Served in the Viet Nam Evacuation and All U.S. Government Personnel Engaged in the Evacuation of Afghanistan | 2021 | Accepted by Ambassador Ross Wilson |
| Jimmy Carter | 2020 | 39th President of the United States of America |
| John Negroponte | 2019 | Deputy Secretary of State, Director of National Intelligence, U.S. Ambassador to Honduras, U.S. Ambassador to Mexico, U.S. Ambassador to the Philippines, U.S. Ambassador to the United Nations, U.S. Ambassador to Iraq |
| James A. Baker III | 2018 | 13th and 19th White House Chief of Staff and 61st U.S. Secretary of State |
| William J. Perry | 2017 | 19th U.S. Secretary of Defense |
| Robert B. Zoellick | 2016 | Former World Bank Group President and U.S. Trade Representative |
| William J. Burns | 2015 | Former Under Secretary of State |
| Carla Anderson Hills | 2014 | Former United States Secretary of Housing and Urban Development |
| George Shultz | 2013 | Former U.S. Secretary of State |
| Richard Lugar | 2012 | Former U.S. Senator |
| Robert Gates | 2011 | Former United States Secretary of Defense |
| Harold H. Saunders | 2010 | Director of International Affairs at the Kettering Foundation |
| William L. Swing | 2009 | Director General, International Organization for Migration |
| Ryan Crocker | 2008 | Ambassador to Iraq |
| Christopher R. Hill | 2007 | Assistant Secretary of State for East Asian and Pacific Affairs |
| Max Kampelman | 2006 | Head of the United States Delegation to the Negotiations with the Soviet Union on Nuclear and Space Arms |
| Men and Women of the Foreign and Civil Service | 2005 | Accepted by Under Secretary R. Nicholas Burns |
| Joseph J. Sisco | 2004 | Former Under Secretary of State |
| John Danforth | 2003 | Former United States Senator |
| Colin Powell | 2002 | United States Secretary of State |
| Kofi Annan | 2001 | Secretary-General of the United Nations |
| Richard Lugar and Sam Nunn | 2000 | U.S. Senators, architects of the Nunn–Lugar Cooperative Threat Reduction initiative |
| Stuart Eizenstat | 1999 | Deputy Secretary of the Treasury |
| George J. Mitchell | 1998 | Peace Negotiations on Northern Ireland |
| George F. Kennan | 1997 | Lifetime Contributions to Diplomacy |
| Dennis Ross | 1996 | Special Middle East Coordinator |
| Richard Holbrooke | 1995 | Dayton Peace Accords on Bosnia |
| Robert Gallucci | 1995 | Ambassador-at-Large; North Korean Negotiations |
| General John Vessey (USA, ret.) | 1994 | President Emissary to Hanoi for missing American servicemen |
| Robert B. Oakley | 1993 | Special Envoy to Somalia |
| no award | 1992 | |
| Vernon Walters | 1991 | Ambassador to Germany |
| Thomas R. Pickering | 1990 | Ambassador to the United Nations |
| Rozanne Ridgway | 1989 | Assistant Secretary of State for European Affairs |
| no award | 1988 | |
| Stephen W. Bosworth | 1987 | Ambassador to the Philippines |
