= F. David Mathews =

American academic and official (born 1935)

David Mathews
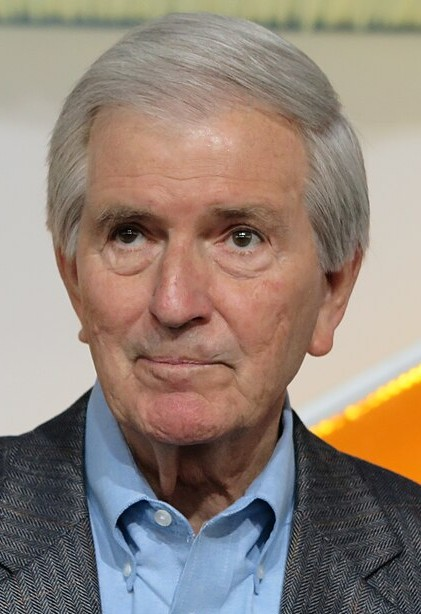
- Mathews in 2015

11th United States Secretary of Health, Education, and Welfare
- In office August 8, 1975 – January 20, 1977
- President: Gerald Ford
- Preceded by: Caspar Weinberger
- Succeeded by: Joseph A. Califano Jr.

Personal details
- Born: Forrest David Mathews; December 6, 1935 (age 90) Grove Hill, Alabama, U.S.
- Party: Independent
- Education: University of Alabama (BA); Columbia University (MA, PhD)

Forrest David Mathews (born December 6, 1935) is an American politician who served as the 11th United States Secretary of Health, Education, and Welfare during the administration of President Gerald Ford from 1975 to 1977. He also served two nonconsecutive terms as the president of the University of Alabama. In 1983, Mathews was elected as a fellow of the National Academy of Public Administration. He served as president and chief executive officer of the Kettering Foundation from 1981 to 2022. He is President and CEO of The Center for Citizenship Community and Democracy (CCCD). He is the author of several books on democratic practice and education.

== Early life and education ==
Mathews was born and grew up in Grove Hill, Alabama. He attended the University of Alabama (AB in history and classical Greek, 1958) and Columbia University (PhD in history, 1965). Mathews was president of the University of Alabama from 1969 to 1975 and again from 1977 to 1980, an era of significant change and innovation. At age 33, Mathews was the university's youngest president. He presided over the integration of the university's football program under Hall of Fame coach Bear Bryant in 1971.

== Political life ==
Mathews is one of only two surviving secretaries of the now defunct Department of Health, Education, and Welfare (the other is his successor, Joseph A. Califano, Jr.). While at HEW, he worked on restoring public confidence in government and reforming the regulatory system. At his swearing in as secretary of HEW, Gerald Ford said, "Mathews brings to this new mission the strength of youth, a sense of purpose, the skills of a scholar, and the trusted record of a successful leader and administrator. That is an impressive inventory by any standard."

== Later life ==
Mathews served as longtime president and chief executive officer of the Kettering Foundation, a not-for-profit research foundation rooted in the American tradition of invention. Charles F. Kettering, best known for inventing the automobile self-starter, created the foundation in 1927. Gradually, the foundation expanded its focus to look beyond scientific solutions, recognizing that problems like world hunger are not technical problems, but rather political problems. In the 1970s, the foundation began to concentrate on democratic politics, particularly the role of citizens. Mathews was elected to the Kettering Foundation board of trustees in 1972, and became its president and CEO in 1981. He held the position for more than four decades, stepping down in April 2022.

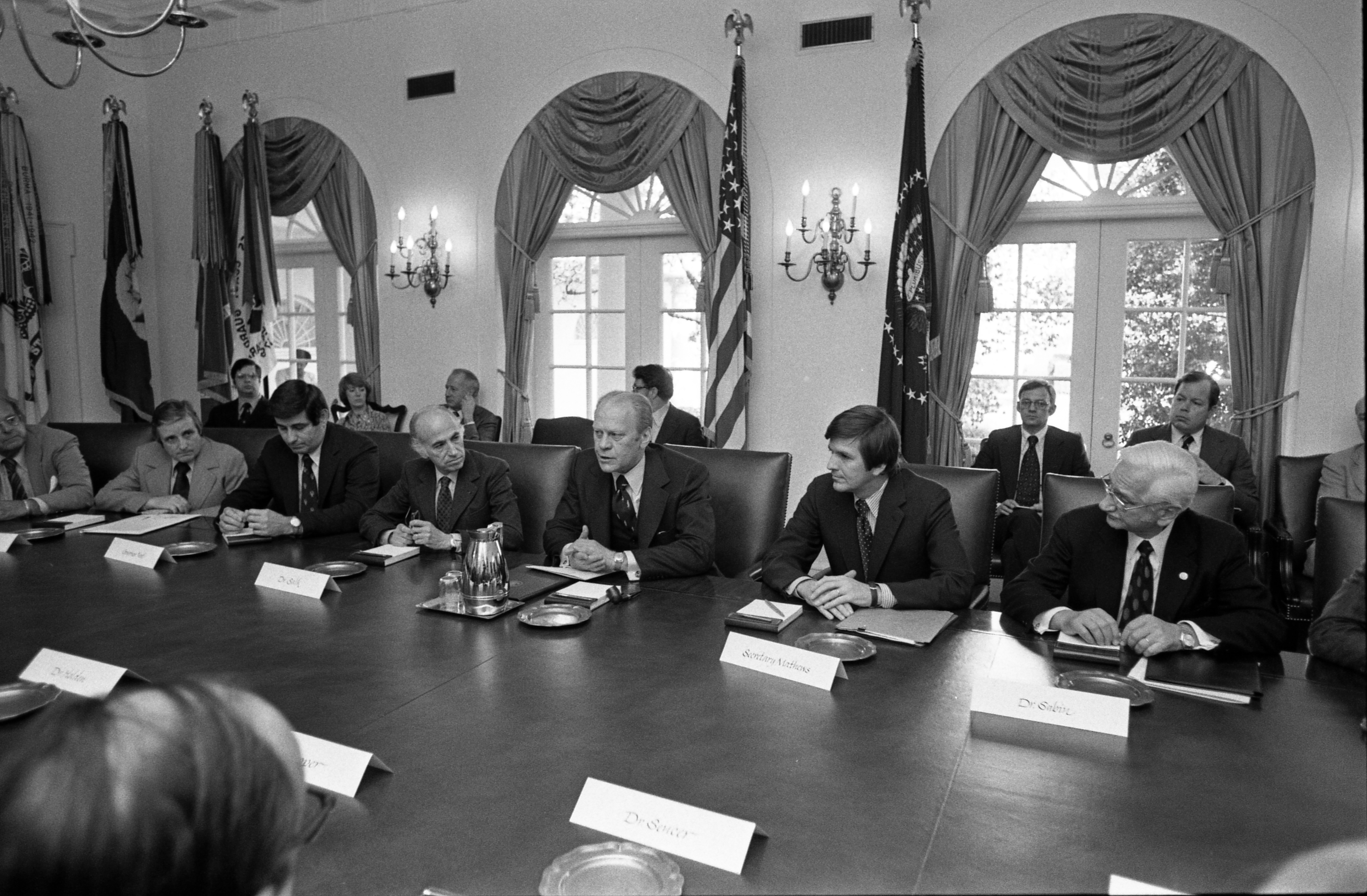
F. David Mathews in a meeting with President Ford to discuss a Federal initiative to immunize all Americans against the swine flu influenza. [l-r: Jonas Salk, President Ford, HEW Secretary F. David Mathews, Albert B. Sabin]; in the Cabinet room on March 24, 1976.

=== Boards and foundations ===
Mathews serves on the board of a variety of organizations, including the Gerald R. Ford Foundation, National Issues Forums Institute, The Center for Citizenship, Community, and Democracy, and Public Agenda. He has received numerous awards, including a citation as one of the Ten Outstanding Young Men in the Nation (Ten Outstanding Young Americans), United States Jaycees (1969); member, Alabama Academy of Honor (1973); Nicholas Murray Butler Medal in Silver, Columbia University (1976); Educator of the Year, Alabama Conference of Black Mayors (1976); and the Brotherhood Award, National Conference of Christians and Jews (1979).

=== Awards ===
He was inducted into the University of Alabama College of Communication and Information Sciences Hall of Fame in 2004 and into the Alabama Healthcare Hall of Fame in 2006. In 2007, the Alabama Center for Civic Life was renamed in his honor as the David Mathews Center for Civic Life. He is the recipient of 17 honorary degrees.

=== Publications ===
Mathews has written extensively on such subjects as education, political theory, southern history, public policy, and international problem solving. His books include Why Public Schools? Whose Public Schools? (NewSouth Books, 2003); For Communities to Work (Kettering Foundation Press, 2002); Politics for People: Finding a Responsible Public Voice (University of Illinois Press, 1999); and Is There a Public for Public Schools? (Kettering Foundation Press, 1996); Reclaiming Public Education by Reclaiming Our Democracy (Kettering Foundation Press, 2006); and The Ecology of Democracy: Finding Ways to Have a Stronger Hand in Shaping Our Future (Kettering Foundation Press, 2014). His most recent books are With the People: An Introduction to an Idea (Kettering Foundation Press, 2020) and Together: Building Better, Stronger Communities (Kettering Foundation Press, 2021).

== See also ==
- Mathews v. Eldridge

Political offices
Preceded by Caspar Weinberger	United States Secretary of Health, Education, and Welfare; 1975–1977	Succeeded by Joseph A. Califano Jr.
U.S. order of precedence (ceremonial)
Preceded by Carla Anderson Hills as Former U.S. Cabinet Member	Order of precedence of the United States as Former U.S. Cabinet Member	Succeeded by John Albert Knebel as Former U.S. Cabinet Member
