= List of peace processes =

The following is a list of peace processes of specific conflicts starting in the late twentieth century.

== Starting in the twentieth century ==
- 1918 Russia–Ukraine negotiations, peace negotiations between Soviet Russia and the Ukrainian State
- Cyprus peace process, from ca. 1974, a prolonged process to find a peaceful solution for the Cyprus problem
- Western Sahara peace process, efforts since ca. 1991 to resolve the Western Sahara conflict
- Israeli–Palestinian peace process, efforts since ca. 1991 to find a political accommodation for the Israeli–Palestinian conflict and the wider Arab–Israeli conflict
- Negotiations to end apartheid in South Africa, successful talks that brought about the end of the apartheid system
- Nagorno–Karabakh peace process coordinated by the OSCE Minsk Group (1991–2021), attempted to resolve the Nagorno–Karabakh conflict
- Kurdish–Turkish peace process, failed attempts to resolve the Kurdish–Turkish conflict (1978–present)
  - 1991–2004 Kurdish–Turkish peace initiatives
  - 1993 Kurdistan Workers' Party ceasefire
  - 2009–2010 Kurdistan Workers' Party ceasefire
  - 2013–2015 PKK–Turkey peace process
- Inter-Tajik Dialogue (1993-2000)
- Northern Ireland peace process, efforts from ca. 1993 to end "the Troubles"
- Guatemalan Peace Process 1994-1996, successful process that ended the Guatemalan Civil War
- Colombia
  - 1999–2002 FARC–Government peace process, failed attempt to resolve the Colombian conflict
  - Colombian peace process (2012–2016), ongoing process to bring an end to the Colombian conflict

== Twenty-first century ==
- Fatah–Hamas reconciliation process, attempts to resolve the Fatah–Hamas conflict
- Syrian peace process (2011–2024), various attempts to find a political solution for the Syrian Civil War
- Yemeni peace process (2011–present), attempts to resolve the Yemeni Crisis, resulted in replacement of the President, but no end to the violence
- Bangsamoro peace process, attempts to find solution for the Moro conflict
- Negotiations during the Venezuelan crisis (2014–present), attempts to resolve the crisis in Venezuela
- Libyan peace process (2015–2020), resolution of the Second Libyan Civil War, leading to the Government of National Unity in February 2021 and planned presidential and parliamentary elections in June 2022
- Afghan peace process (2018–2021), various attempts to find a peaceful resolve to the War in Afghanistan, ended with a decisive Taliban military victory
- 2018–19 Korean peace process, failed attempt to end the Korean conflict
- Sudanese peace process (2019–2020) was an attempt to resolve the War in Darfur and the Sudanese conflict in South Kordofan and Blue Nile
- Tigrayan peace process (2020–2022), attempts to resolve the Tigray War
- Peace negotiations in the Russian invasion of Ukraine (2022-present), peace negotiations between Russia and Ukraine after the former's invasion of the latter
- 2025 Kurdish-Turkey Peace Process, peace negotiations between the Kurdistan Workers' Party, mediated and joined by the pro-Kurdish DEM Party, and the Turkish State to resolve the decades-long Kurdish insurgency in the country's South-East and to alter the place of Kurds in Turkey.

== See also ==
- List of peace activists
