= Harold H. Saunders =

American diplomat

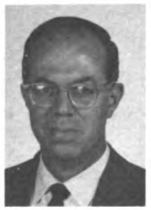

12th Assistant Secretary of State for Near Eastern and South Asian Affairs
- In office April 11, 1978 – January 16, 1981
- President: Jimmy Carter
- Preceded by: Alfred L. Atherton
- Succeeded by: Nicholas A. Veliotes

6th Director of the Bureau of Intelligence and Research
- In office December 1, 1975 – April 10, 1978
- President: Gerald Ford
- Preceded by: William G. Hyland
- Succeeded by: William G. Bowdler

Personal details
- Born: Harold Henry Saunders; December 27, 1930 Philadelphia, Pennsylvania
- Died: March 6, 2016 (aged 85) McLean, Virginia
- Education: Princeton University; Yale University

Harold Henry Saunders (December 27, 1930 – March 6, 2016) served as the United States Assistant Secretary of State for Intelligence and Research between 1975 and 1978 and United States Assistant Secretary of State for Near East Affairs between 1978 and 1981. Saunders was a key participant in the Camp David Accords, helped negotiate the Iran Hostage Crisis, and developed the sustained dialogue model for resolving conflicts Saunders later launched the Sustained Dialogue Institute, which uses the sustained dialogue model to address racial and other issues in the United States and abroad.

Additionally, Saunders was director of international affairs at the Kettering Foundation and co-chaired the Dartmouth Conference Task Force. He authored several works, including The Other Walls: The Arab-Israeli Peace Process in a Global Perspective (1985), A Public Peace Process: Sustained Dialogue to Transform Racial and Ethnic Conflict (1999), Politics Is about Relationship: A Blueprint for the Citizens’ Century (2005), and Sustained Dialogue in Conflicts: Transformation and Change (2011).

== Background ==
=== Education and service ===
Saunders graduated from Princeton University in 1952 with an A.B. and Yale University in 1955 with a Ph.D, prior to joining the United States Air Force to fulfill the mandatory service requirement, which led to a liaison role with the Central Intelligence Agency. Saunders joined the National Security Council staff in 1961, serving through the Johnson administration as the NSC's Mideast expert during June 1967 Six-Day War. He died of prostate cancer in 2016.

== Diplomatic career ==
=== Kissinger Shuttles ===
Saunders joined the Kissinger shuttles in October 1973 as an integral part of the small team of American diplomats led by Kissinger, with whom Saunders worked for the next eight years. During this period from 1973 to 1975, the Kissinger team helped negotiate a number of key disengagement agreements between Egypt and Israel. In 1974, Saunders was appointed deputy assistant secretary of state for the Near East and North Africa.

In a 2010 article for Foreign Policy magazine, long-term Middle East analyst and negotiator Aaron David Miller credited the "brilliant" Saunders with coining the term "peace process," in connection with negotiations over conflict in the Middle East.

=== Camp David ===
As assistant secretary of state for the Near East and South Asia under President Carter, Saunders played a critical behind-the-scenes role during the 1978 negotiations at Camp David, culminating in the two framework agreements comprising the Camp David Accords, leading directly to the Egypt-Israel Peace Treaty in the following year, which Saunders helped draft.

=== Iran Hostage Crisis ===
In 1979, following the revolution in Iran, Saunders coordinated efforts to secure the release of the U.S. embassy staff held during the Iran hostage crisis.

== Sustained Dialogue ==
=== Dartmouth Conference ===
In October 2010, the Dartmouth Conference celebrated its 50th anniversary of a dialogue between Russian and American citizens, which began as a critically needed back-channel at the behest of President Eisenhower and Soviet Premier Khrushchev in 1960. Although program takes its name from Dartmouth College, where the first meeting was held, it has no affiliation with the American educational institution. James Voorhees's 2002 book published by the United States Institute of Peace, Dialogue Sustained, chronicles the first four decades of the dialogue. For the Dartmouth Conference's 50th anniversary, the Kettering Foundation published an additional volume to commemorate and chronicle all five decades.

=== Inter-Tajik Dialogue ===
The Inter-Tajik Dialogue developed out of Saunders's work with the Dartmouth Conference Regional Conflicts Task Force as a series of unofficial, Track II dialogues between warring factions in the Tajik civil war. The dialogues took place in Moscow, beginning in 1993 and lasting until 2003, during which 35 meetings took place.

=== Sustained Dialogue Institute ===
The Sustained Dialogue Institute is an independent tax-exempt 501 (c)(3) organization formed in collaboration with the Kettering Foundation. Saunders served as president of the institute from its founding in 2002 until June 2013 and remained Board Chair until his passing in 2016. The Institute helps citizens around the world to transform their conflictual or destructive relationships and to design and implement sustainable change processes.

=== Domestic and Global Influence ===
In 1991, Saunders facilitated Israeli and Palestinian citizen-leaders who forged and signed the historic document, "Framework for a Public Peace Process" . This inspired the 1992 birth of the Jewish-Palestinian Living Room Dialogue in California, a model of Saunders' citizen-to-citizen Sustained Dialogue with domestic and global impact. The Sustained Dialogue process itself is now used on college campuses throughout the world to facilitate better community relations, under the work of the Sustained Dialogue Campus Network. His legacy endures for negotiators and citizens equally: "There are some things only governments can do, such as negotiating binding agreements. But there are some things that only citizens outside government can do, such as changing human relationships." Saunders' legacy was reflected in the 2017 Commencement Address of Notre Dame de Namur University,"STORIES OF CHANGE: Creating a Culture of Connection in The Citizens’ Century."

== Books ==
- Saunders, Harold H. (1991). The other walls : the Arab-Israeli peace process in a global perspective (Rev. ed.). Princeton, NJ: Princeton Univ. Press. ISBN 978-0691023373.
- Saunders, Harold H. (2005). Politics is about relationship : a blueprint for the citizens' century (1st ed.). New York: Palgrave Macmillan. ISBN 1403971455.
- Saunders, Harold H. (1999). A public peace process : sustained dialogue to transform racial and ethnic conflicts (1st ed.). New York: St. Martin's Press. ISBN 0312219393.
- Saunders, Harold H. (2011). Sustained dialogue in conflicts : transformation and change (1st ed.). New York: Palgrave Macmillan. pp. 36–37. ISBN 9780230339804.

=== Awards ===
- The Walter and Leonore Annenberg Award for Excellence in Diplomacy from the American Academy of Diplomacy, "November 30, 3010"
- Lifetime Achievement Award from Search for Common Ground, March, 2004, to honor outstanding accomplishments in conflict resolution, community building, and peacemaking.

Government offices
Preceded by William G. Hyland	Director of the Bureau of Intelligence and Research; December 1, 1975 – April 10, 1978	Succeeded by William G. Bowdler
Preceded by Alfred Atherton	Assistant Secretary of State for Near Eastern and South Asian Affairs; April 11, 1978 – January 16, 1981	Succeeded by Nicholas A. Veliotes
