= List of ambassadors of Russia to Bolivia =

Ambassador of the Russian Federation to the Plurinational State of Bolivia
- Emblem of the Russian Foreign Ministry
- Incumbent; Dmitry Verchenko since 15 August 2024
- Ministry of Foreign Affairs; Embassy of Russia in La Paz
- Style: His Excellency; The Honourable
- Reports to: Minister of Foreign Affairs
- Seat: La Paz
- Appointer: President of Russia
- Term length: At the pleasure of the president
- Formation: 1970
- First holder: Aleksey Shcherbachevich
- Website: Embassy of Russia in Bolivia

The ambassador extraordinary and plenipotentiary of the Russian Federation to the Plurinational State of Bolivia is the official representative of the president and the government of the Russian Federation to the president and the government of Bolivia.

The ambassador and his staff work at large in the Embassy of Russia in La Paz. The post of Russian ambassador to Bolivia is currently held by Dmitry Verchenko, incumbent since 25 August 2024.

== History of diplomatic relations ==
Diplomatic relations between Bolivia and Russia date back to the 19th century. On 9 August 1898 the Bolivian ambassador to Paris, Francisco de Argadonia, presented his credentials to Emperor Nicholas II and was thereafter accredited as Bolivia's envoy to Russia.

Relations at the mission level between the Soviet Union and Bolivia were first established on 18 April 1945. There was no formal exchange of ambassadors however until 1969, when embassies were opened in both capitals. The first Soviet ambassador to Bolivia, Aleksey Shcherbachevich, was appointed on 26 March 1970. With the dissolution of the Soviet Union in 1991, the Soviet ambassador, Vladimir Kiselyov, continued as representative of the Russian Federation until 1995.

== List of representatives (1970–present) ==
=== Soviet Union to Bolivia (1970–1991) ===
Name	Title	Appointment	Termination	Notes
Aleksey Shcherbachevich	Ambassador	26 March 1970	24 July 1975	
Boris Kazantsev	Ambassador	24 July 1975	10 April 1981	
Sergey Kovalyov	Ambassador	10 April 1981	31 July 1983	
Arkady Glukhov	Ambassador	10 October 1983	25 May 1987	
Takhir Durdiyev	Ambassador	25 May 1987	18 March 1991	
Vladimir Kiselyov	Ambassador	18 March 1991	25 December 1991	

=== Russian Federation to Bolivia (1991–present) ===
Name	Title	Appointment	Termination	Notes
Vladimir Kiselyov	Ambassador	25 December 1991	31 January 1995	
Yury Nosenko	Ambassador	31 January 1995	30 June 1998	
Gennady Sizov	Ambassador	30 June 1998	11 July 2003	
Vladimir Kulikov	Ambassador	11 July 2003	23 April 2008	
Leonid Golubev	Ambassador	23 April 2008	15 February 2012	
Aleksey Sazonov	Ambassador	15 February 2012	26 July 2017	
Vladimir Sprinchan	Ambassador	26 July 2017	10 December 2020	
Mikhail Ledenyov	Ambassador	10 December 2020	15 August 2024	
Dmitry Verchenko	Ambassador	15 August 2024		
