= Yelena Skrynnik =

Russian politician

- Елена Скрынник
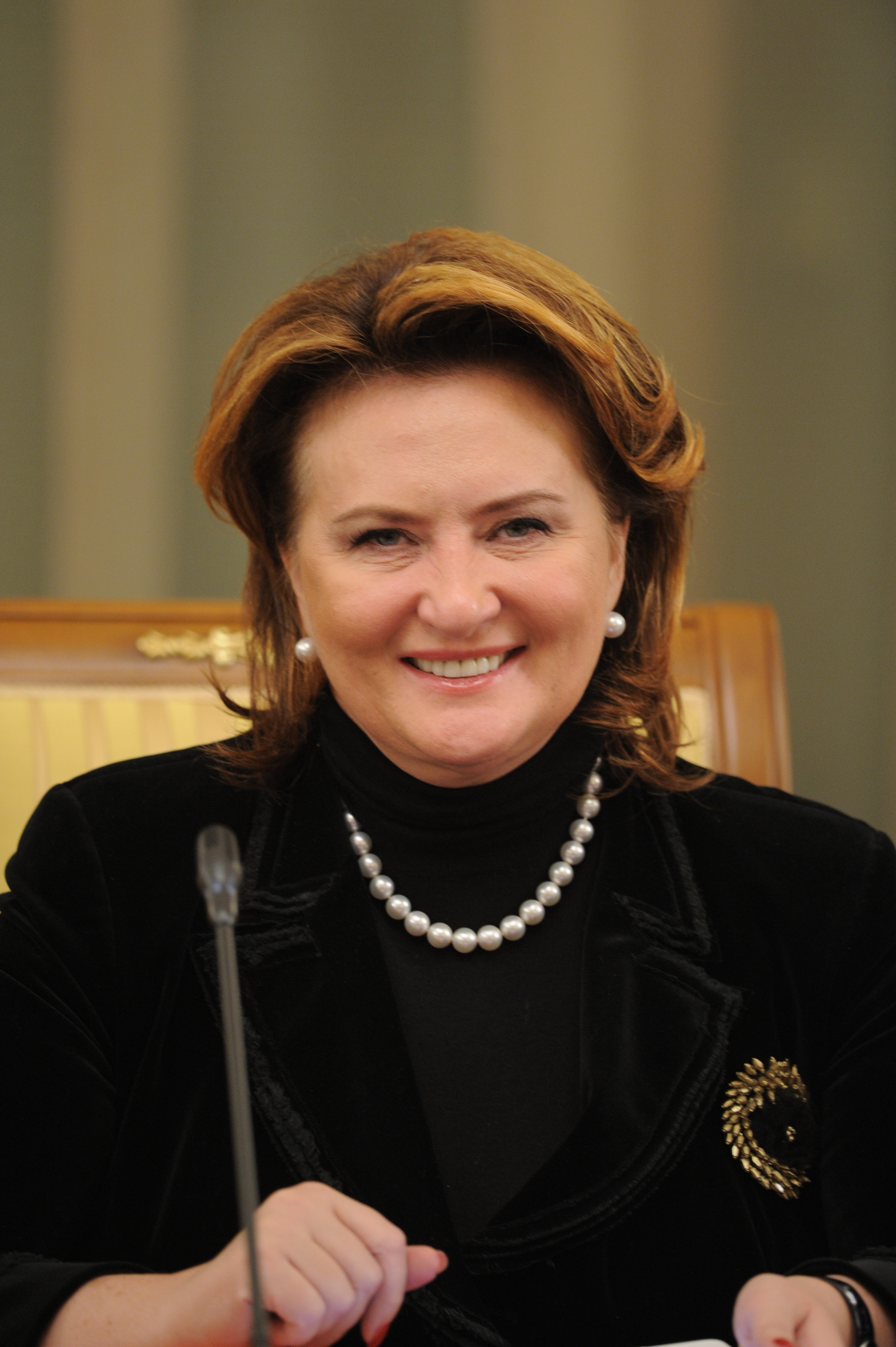
- Skrynnik in 2011

Minister of Agriculture
- In office 12 March 2009 – 21 May 2012
- President: Dmitry Medvedev; Vladimir Putin
- Prime Minister: Vladimir Putin; Dmitry Medvedev
- Preceded by: Alexey Gordeyev
- Succeeded by: Nikolay Fyodorov

Personal details
- Born: 30 August 1961 (age 65) Korkino, Chelyabinsk Oblast, Russian Federation
- Party: United Russia
- Education: Chelyabinsk Medical Academy; State Academy of Agriculture of Russian Federation
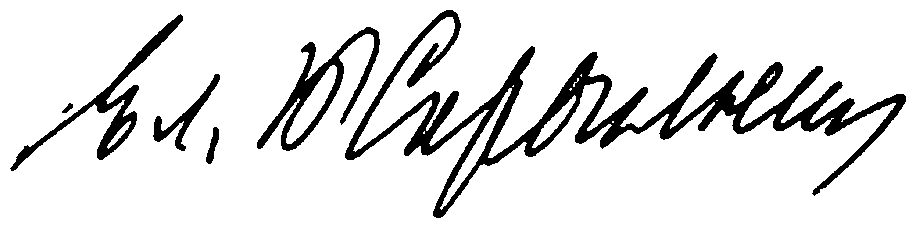
- Signature

Elena Borisovna Skrynnik (Russian: Елена Борисовна Скрынник; maiden name Novitskaya) (born 30 August 1961) is a Russian politician. She served as the first female minister of agriculture of the Russian Federation between March 2009 and May 2012.

== Early life ==
Skrynnik was born on 30 August 1961 in Korkino, Chelyabinsk Oblast, Russia. Her father was a mining engineer. In 1986, she graduated from Chelyabinsk Medical Academy.

In 1992, Skrynnik graduated from the State Academy of Agriculture of the Russian Federation and interned in Germany and France in the field of leasing technologies.

== Career ==
Skrynnik worked at the Chelyabinsk Polytechnical Institute clinic and later as deputy chief surgeon of Chelyabinsk Metallurgy Enterprise clinic. She continued her medical career in cardiology at a regional clinic.

In 1994, she founded an Inter-regional medical leasing company named Medleasing. She acquired the sobriquet "Madam Leasing" and was accused of money laundering. The inspection and audit of the accounting chamber did not confirm these allegations. As a result, the article was perceived by experts as an attempt to slow down the development of the leasing industry in Russia by attacking her as the Russian specialist in this field.

In 1998, she was given an international award for best leasing project. In 1997, she assumed the chair of the Russian Association of Leasing Companies and in 1998 she became the chairwoman of Experts Council for Leasing.

In 1999, the Russian Biography Institute declared her Person of the Year in economics and entrepreneurship. In 2000, she became a board member of the Union of Russian Manufacturers and Entrepreneurs.

In 2002, she became the general director of state-run company Rosagroleasing. According to Kommersant, Rosagroleasing under her guidance had significantly higher turnover and greater transparency versus the leadership of Valery Nazarov.

In November 2008, she was elected to the Supreme Council of Russian political party United Russia. On 12 March 2009, Prime Minister Vladimir Putin appointed Skrynnik minister of agriculture. Her tenure ended in 2012 when she was removed from office due to her alleged involvement in nepotism and illegal activities. Skrynnik was not included in the new Russian government in 2012, while on maternity leave. Allegations of possible corruption connections were refuted by the report of the Accounting Chamber, according to which the lessees debt in 2008 amounted to 1 billion rubles and not 39 billion rubles, as the media claimed.

The corruption component was not supported by the auditors of Accounting Chamber. In an interview with TASS Skrynnik announced her intention to sue the journalists. According to some analysts, an inquiry of her activities can be explained as an intra-elite struggle presented under the guise of a fight against corruption. Skrynnik, heading the state-owned company, was not a government official and was not governed by civil service, so she did not commit any violations.

It is possible that problems could appear because of Skrynnik's disagreements with Viktor Zubkov. Skrynnik could face administration friction with the first vice-premier of agriculture, since he wanted to manage all agricultural policy matters. "Zubkov was meant to respond hard to violations of Rosagroleasing in any case,- said Yevgeny Minchenko from the Institute of Political Expertise: "To turn away a blow, as he led the company's board of directors".

On 18 February 2016 a TV program Moment of Truth came on Channel 5, stating that the charges in the address of Skrynnik were a frame-up. Author and presenter Andrew Karaulov analyzed her activity as a Minister of Agriculture, and concluded that the cause of the incident was her decision to drastically reduce imports of "Bush legs" to the Russian market. Another reason was the successful implementation of the program of import substitution, promoted by Skrynnik signed by Putin. In an attempt to discredit Skrynnik, the film accused the largest producers of chicken meat in the United States.Criminal cases were not opened against her.

In October 2015, the Swiss Federal attorney opened a criminal investigation against Skrynnik on suspicion of money laundering and ordered her bank accounts frozen. It soon became clear that the reports were false. Skrynnik and the seizure of her accounts are not mentioned in the request to the General Prosecutor of the Russian Federation for legal assistance in a criminal case in Switzerland in relation to Russian defendants. Sergei Ivanov, the presidential chief of staff of Russian Federation, said: "As far as I know, the General Prosecutor of Switzerland has no claims specifically to Elena Skrynnik. There are claims, and significant ones, in relation to her deputy, who previously worked in "Rosagroleasing." In his opinion, we should not pay attention to the publications in media on that. "Do not read Soviet newspapers".

Some Russian media incorrectly reported that she was expelled from United Russia. Sergey Neverov, the ex-Secretary of United Russia General Council said, "The information about her expulsion is not consistent with the reality".

Skrynnik was a Candidate of Sciences in economics since 2010. On 24 December 2014 she was stripped of her degree because her thesis was plagiarised.

=== Minister of Agriculture ===
From 12 March 2009 to 21 May 2012 she served as Minister of Agriculture. Her activities in agriculture were noted by Boris Gryzlov, Chairman of the State Duma of the Russian Federation: "Elena Skrynnik ... made a great contribution to the development of agricultural support mechanisms. During regional business trips, I often visit farm units ... and I know how leasing programs are in demand for agricultural production."

In May 2009 Skrynnik established a state-owned company for the supply of fuel, oil and lubricants at preferential prices for rural areas. The Ministry later established a system of uninterrupted supply of fuel, oil and lubricants for rural equipment and technology on preferential terms. In 2011 the Russian government decided to end sugar imports, as for the preceding two years domestic sugar beet production was sufficient. In the same year, Russia began exporting sugar for the first time ever.

Under Skrynnik's leadership Russia began providing itself with the main categories of agricultural products. The Ministry started active cooperation with the Federal Anti-Monopoly Service. On 1 January 2010 the directive of a Chief State Medical Officer came into effect in Russia that banned selling chicken disinfected with high-concentration chlorine compounds. Skrynnik was seen as one of the initiators of this ban. In 2010 Skrynnik began carrying out a policy of import substitution, reducing poultry imports and increasing exports of Russian meat. Skrynnik also banned import of milk powder to Russia from Belarus.

Following the 2010 drought, in August 2010 the Ministry resumed the work of the Federal Commission to restructure debts of agricultural companies. The commission's task was to prevent bankruptcies due to drought. Skrynnik increased lending in 2011 to restore agricultural production. Locust plagues across Russia disrupted production in 2011. Skrynnik supported initiative of creating special mobile units to control the pests.

== Controversies ==
In November 2012, VGTRK published an investigation about Skrynnik stating that during her ministership of agriculture, the ministry allegedly allocated money from its budget to improve housing conditions of employees but eventually spent the funds on purchasing mansions in the Rublyovka area. Skrynnik denied the accusations and said that she would sue the journalists for defamation.

== Recognition ==
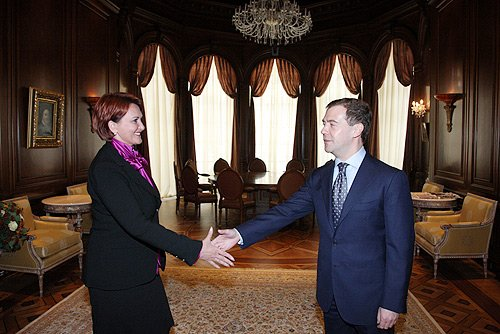
Skrynnik and Russian President Dmitry Medvedev in the Kremlin.

- Medal of the Order of Merit for the Fatherland, 2nd class (15 November 2005)
- Gratitude of the President
- Diploma of the Government of the Russian Federation
- Gold medal for "Contribution to the development of agro-industrial complex."
- Order of St Princess Olga, 3rd class (Russian Orthodox Church)
- Order of the Martyr Tryphon, 3rd class (Russian Orthodox Church)
