= Voto Latino =

American nonprofit focused on Latino voters

Logo

Voto Latino is a dual 501(c)(4) and 501(c)(3) nonprofit organization in the United States, founded in 2004. The organization's primary aim is to encourage young Hispanic and Latino voters to register to vote and become more politically involved. The organization was co-founded by Rosario Dawson and Phil Colón. The current president and CEO is María Teresa Kumar.

== History ==
Voto Latino was created in response to challenges Latino communities faced in both political engagement and technological literacy in the early 2000s. Voto Latino used various social media platforms and telenovela-like videos to engage young Hispanic voters. Voto Latino celebrated their ten-year anniversary one year late in 2015.

== Activities ==
Voto Latino is involved with raising awareness about politics for Hispanic voters and also how to register to vote. Because many Latino voters are the first to vote in their families, Voto Latino works to interest young voters. Voto Latino also provides education about United States citizenship for permanent residents of the US.

=== Campaigns ===
==== 2006 election cycle ====
In August 2006, Voto Latino began its first voter-registration effort, called "Text2Represent", which allowed voters to register to vote through text, becoming one of the first political organizations to do so. Co-founder Rosario Dawson cited the relevancy of text messaging: "If 65 million people were willing to text their votes for American Idol, perhaps at least a few of them might pick up their phones to sign up for something a little more important."

In September of the same year, Voto Latino also focused on young voters by releasing a series of PSA videos featuring popular Latino musical artists.

==== 2008 election cycle ====
In January 2008, Voto Latino, along with Declare Yourself, produced "La Pasión de la Decisión", a video campaign intended to help Latinos register and vote in the 2008 general election. The series won a Webby Award for Best Online Film/Video Promoting Public Service & Activism.

In April 2008, Voto Latino launched "Crash the Parties", with Sí TV, a nationwide search for two Latinos to become reporters at the Democratic National Convention and the Republican National Convention.

==== 2010 Census and election cycle ====
In March 2010, Voto Latino launched "Be Counted" along with MTV, an online campaign to make sure Latinos were adequately counted in the 2010 Census. The Youtube channel garnered more than 500,000 views and raised $150 million in federal funding for Latino communities around the country. The campaign also included a bilingual mobile phone app which enabled Latinos to fill out the 2010 census on their phones.

In September 2010, Voto Latino launched "United We Win", a campaign to register Latinos before the 2010 midterm election, utilizing PSAs featuring a variety of celebrities, such as Rosario Dawson, Jessica Alba, Eva Longoria, and Common. The initiative managed to register more than 10,000 voters in its four weeks.

==== 2012 election cycle ====
In 2012, Voto Latino launched a number of campaigns aimed at young Latino voters, encouraging them to register to vote and go to the polls. In March, they launched "Make it Count", which included a series of PSAs with celebrities such as Demi Lovato, Michael Peña, and Rafael Amaya. In June, America Ferrera began America4America with Voto Latino, a media and grassroots campaign steered towards young voters. In July, Voto Latino launched the "Rep Ur Letters Challenge", a challenge geared towards Latino Greek organizations to see which organization could register the most voters.

==== 2014 election cycle ====
In August 2014, Voto Latino relaunched "United We Win", partnering with Global Grind. In the aftermath of the prevalence of unjust shootings of young men of color, the organization provided a space for people to register to vote and have their voices heard. In September of the same year, Voto Latino instituted the first "Hispanic Heritage Month of Action", a voting registration campaign. The campaign primarily relied on online media, and achieved 261 million social media impressions.

==== "Yo Soy" campaign ====
In November 2014, Voto Latino launched "Yo Soy", a campaign to bring awareness to sex education and reproductive issues in Latino communities. The campaign partnered with health organizations all over the country, including Advocates for Youth, Organization for Latina Opportunity and Reproductive Rights, California Latinas for Reproductive Justice, Hispanic Federation, and the National Latina Institute for Reproductive Health.

==== 2016 election cycle ====
In 2016, Voto Latino had several campaigns, mostly focused on Latino voter registration and getting out to the polls. In March, the organization launched a voter registration mobile app, called VoterPal. The app allowed for people to quickly register people using their driver's license at public events, including an event with bands Maná and Los Tigres del Norte. In June, Voto Latino launched the "BRAVE" campaign, an effort to spotlight people demonstrating bravery despite facing adversity. In September, the organization released a PSA with the cast members of East Los High. In October, another PSA was released, featuring Junot Díaz. Both videos focused on the themes from the year's campaigns: civic engagement, bravery, and showing up to the polls.

In November 2016, Voto Latino had registered 177k voters, surpassing their goal of 150,000.

==== 2018 election cycle ====
In June 2018, Voto Latino launched "Somos Más", a campaign intended to register one million young Latino voters. The campaign primarily focused on states with large Latino communities: Texas, Nevada, Colorado, Arizona, New Mexico, Florida, and California. The organization also announced that it had set a new goal of registering one million voters by 2020 and was planning to spend $7 million on the project.

==== 2020 Census and election cycle ====
In March 2019, "Somos Más" expanded its voter registration campaign towards Census participation and education, beginning on César Chávez Day.

In January 2020, Voto Latino partnered with Steve Madden stores, allowing customers to register to vote in 81 locations easily. In March, Voto Latino nicknamed Super Tuesday "Super Taco Tuesday", after hosting an event in Houston where voters received free tacos. It also partnered with Lyft to give free rides to the polls, and also maintained a large media presence to continue registering and encouraging voters.

In November 2020, the organization announced it had registered 601,000 voters in the 2020 election cycle, surpassing its original goal of 500,000. In the Georgia Senate runoff election in January 2021, Voto Latino announced that of the new voters registered in Georgia since the general election, 15% had been registered by Voto Latino.

==== "¡Adiós Sinema!" campaign ====
In January 2022, Voto Latino launched "¡Adiós Sinema!", a campaign against Arizona Senator Kyrsten Sinema, geared toward Latino voters. According to Voto Latino, the campaign aims to "hold Senator Kyrsten Sinema accountable for her obstruction of critical voting reforms that would have protected the rights of millions of Latino voters." The organization also pledged to a six-figure ad buy in the 2024 primary election.

==== "Vota Con Ganas" campaign ====
In October 2024, Voto Latino launched "Vota Con Ganas", a campaign to increase voter registration and participation within the Latino community. This $5 million initiative included voter registration drives, educational workshops, and public service announcement videos featuring Latino celebrities such as America Ferrera, Gina Torres, Gabriel Luna, Jessica Alba, Wilmer Valderrama, DannyLux, and Xochitl Gomez.

=== Lawsuits ===
Voto Latino has been a plaintiff in a number of lawsuits against states in voter disenfranchisement cases.

==== Texas Vote by Mail Restrictions ====
On May 11, 2021, Voto Latino sued the Texas Secretary of State, along with the Texas State Conference of the National Association for the Advancement of Colored People and the Texas Alliance for Retired Americans, over a number of new restrictions added to the Texas Election Code that make voting by mail "difficult, if not impossible", according to the organization. The new provisions included a requirement that voters pay their own postage, which CEO María Teresa Kumar called "a modern-day poll tax". Other new requirements included stricter time frames for when the mail-in votes are counted, stricter signature verification, and making the returning of a mail-in ballot by someone other than the voter themself a crime.

In light of the COVID-19 pandemic happening at the time, Kumar called the new restrictions "a shameless ploy to disenfranchise millions of Texan voters by forcing them to choose between their health and safety, and their constitutionally-guaranteed right to vote," and that "the executive branch of Texas is weaponizing a global crisis in order to suppress the vote of their own constituents."

==== Texas SB 1111 ====
On June 22, 2021, Voto Latino filed a lawsuit against Texas State Bill 1111 jointly with Texas State LULAC, saying that the stricter measures for proof of residency make voting more inaccessible to vulnerable groups. Voto Latino CEO María Teresa Kumar stated that SB 1111 "is intended to confuse and discourage voters by threatening penalty over minor address discrepancies. The premise of this bill is a fallacy, and its real intention is clear. It is designed to suppress voter turnout throughout the state, specifically targeting young people, lower-income people, and people of color."

On August 2, 2022, U.S. District Judge Lee Yeakel ruled in favor of Voto Latino and LULAC, blocking SB 1111 from taking effect. In his ruling, he stated that the residence provision was "unconstitutionally vague and overbroad."

==== Texas SB 1 ====
On September 7, 2021, Voto Latino filed a lawsuit against Texas State Bill 1, along with LULAC Texas, the Texas Alliance for Retired Americans, and the Texas American Federation of Teachers. The organization stated that "The law limits early voting hours, cuts local options for casting ballots, restricts mail-in voting, and allows partisan poll watchers unprecedented access to polling places. Each of these provisions is designed to prevent Texas voters – particularly voters of color – from casting a ballot." In a statement, CEO María Teresa Kumar added that Voto Latino seeks to protect the right to vote for "the additional 250,000 young Latino Tejanos who will reach voting age in 2022."

==== Texas Redistricting Maps ====
On October 25, 2021, Voto Latino filed a complaint along with individual plaintiffs against Texas Governor Abbott for violating Section 2 of the Voting Rights Act, with the support of the National Redistricting Action Fund (NRAF), who found that the new district maps do not adequately represent communities of color. In the 2020 Census, Texas saw an increase in population, primarily due to the growth of its Latino population, which increased by two million. This population growth led to an apportionment of an additional two congressional seats for Texas, becoming the only state to do so. According to the organization, "95% of the state's population growth between 2010 and 2020 came from communities of color. Yet the congressional redistricting plan signed into law by Governor Abbott actually decreases the number of districts in which the state's communities of color have a reasonable opportunity to elect their preferred candidates, and increases the number of districts where a majority of voting-age residents are white."

The case has been added to other lawsuits filed against the new district maps, under the lead case League of United Latin American Citizens v. Abbott, a currently ongoing case.

==== Arizona SB 1260 ====
On August 15, 2022, Voto Latino filed a joint lawsuit with the Arizona Alliance for Retired Americans and Priorities USA against Arizona State Bill 1260. The bill "criminalizes individuals and organizations who provide voting assistance to Arizona voters if the person they are helping is registered to vote in another state," according to the organization. CEO María Teresa Kumar called out the bill for disenfranchising Latino voters specifically, saying the law is "aimed directly at the Latino community, and it criminalizes efforts to help individual people defend their rights."
