= Obama–Medvedev Commission =

Bilateral U.S-Russia commission

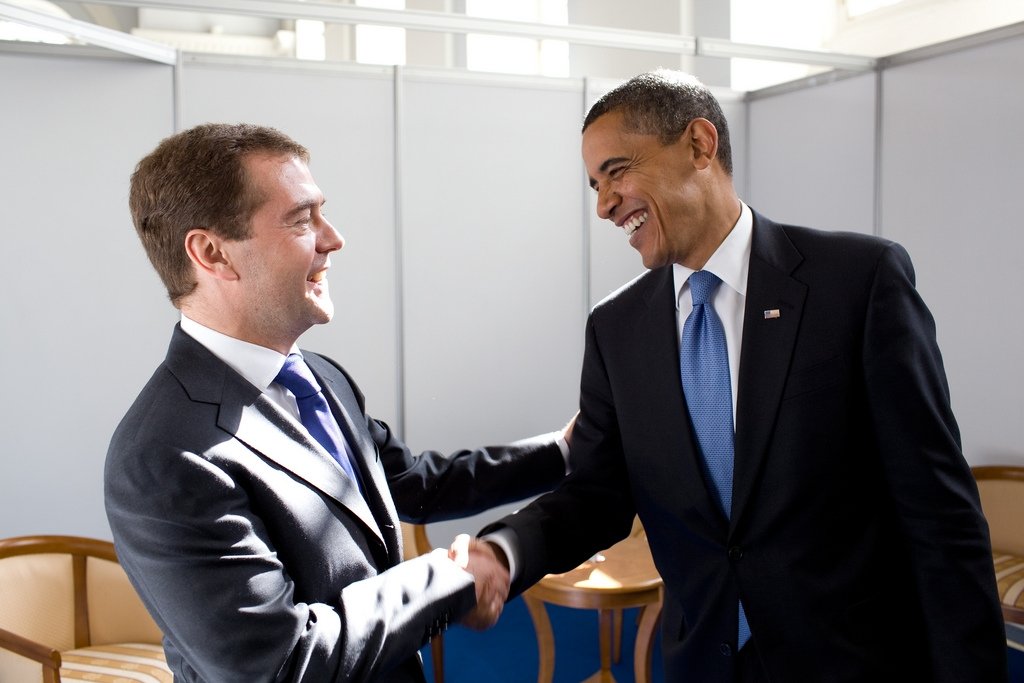
President Medvedev and President Obama in Moscow, July 6, 2009 (Photo: White House)

The Obama–Medvedev Commission, officially known as the U.S.–Russia Bilateral Presidential Commission, was announced on July 6, 2009, by President of the United States Barack Obama and President of the Russian Federation Dmitry Medvedev during President Obama's visit to Moscow, as a way to improve communication and cooperation between the governments of Russia and the United States. The two Presidents announced that the work of the commission would be coordinated by Secretary of State Hillary Clinton and Russian Foreign Minister Sergei Lavrov.

Since 2014, the rapid deterioration of relations between Russia and the United States has seen the activities of the commission been largely curtailed and is essentially defunct.

== Purpose of the Commission ==
According to the commission's mission statement which the two sides agreed to in October 2009, the purpose of the commission is "identifying areas of cooperation and pursuing joint projects and actions that strengthen strategic stability, international security, economic well-being, and the development of ties between the Russian and American people....the foundation for the work of the commission is based on the core principles of friendship, cooperation, openness, and predictability, and we are resolved to address disagreements openly and honestly in a spirit of mutual respect and acknowledgement of each other's perspective.".

== Composition of the Commission ==
Presidents Obama and Medvedev agreed that the commission would have thirteen working groups. In October 2009, during the visit to Moscow of Secretary of State Clinton, three additional working groups were added; on Counterterrorism, Environment, and Military to Military. In addition, Sports was added as a sub-group of the Working Group on Education and Cultural Exchanges, and a Policy Steering Group was created, headed by Russian Deputy Foreign Minister Sergei Ryabkov and Under Secretary of State for Political Affairs William J. Burns. The working groups were:

- Policy Steering Group: chaired by Deputy Foreign Minister Sergei Ryabkov and Under Secretary of State William J. Burns.
- Nuclear Energy and Nuclear Security: chaired by Sergei Kiriyenko, head of Rosatom, and Daniel Poneman, Deputy Secretary of Energy.
- Arms Control and International Security: chaired by Sergei Ryabkov, Russian Deputy Minister of Foreign Affairs, and Ellen Tauscher, Under Secretary of State for Arms Control and International Security Affairs.
- Drug Trafficking: chaired by Viktor Ivanov, Director, Russian Federal Drug Enforcement Service, and Gil Kerlikowske, Director, Office of National Drug Control Policy.
- Business Development and Economic Relations: chaired by Elvira Nabiullina, Minister of Economic Development, and Gary Locke, United States Secretary of Commerce.
- Energy and Environment: chaired by Sergei Shmatko, Minister of Energy, and Steven Chu, United States Secretary of Energy.
- Agriculture: chaired by Yelena Skrynnik, Minister of Agriculture, and Tom Vilsack, United States Secretary of Agriculture.
- Science and Technologies: chaired by Andrei Fursenko, Minister of Education and Science, and John Holdren, Director, Office of Science and Technology Policy.
- Space Cooperation: chaired by Anatoly Perminov, head of the Russian Federal Space Agency, and Charles Bolden, the Administrator of the National Aeronautics and Space Administration.
- Health: chaired by Tatyana Golikova, Minister of Health, and Kathleen Sebelius, United States Secretary of Health and Human Services.
- Cooperation in Prevention and Handling of Emergency Situations: chaired by Sergei Shoigu, Minister of Emergency Situations, and Craig Fugate, Administrator of the Federal Emergency Management Agency
- Civil Society: chaired by Vladislav Surkov, First Deputy Chief of Staff, Presidential Administration, and Michael McFaul, Special Assistant to the President and Senior Director for Russia, National Security Council.
- Educational and Cultural Exchanges: chaired by Mikhail Shvydkoy, Special Presidential Envoy on International Cultural Cooperation, and Judith McHale, Under Secretary of State for Public Diplomacy and Public Affairs.
- Counterterrorism
- Environment
- Military to Military: chaired by Army General Nikolai Makarov, Chief of the General Staff of the Russian Armed Forces and Admiral Michael Mullen, Chairman of the Joint Chiefs of Staff.
- Intelligence: chaired by Mikhail Fradkov, Director of the Foreign Intelligence Service and David Petraeus, Director of the Central Intelligence Agency.
- Defence Relations: chaired by Anatoly Serdyukov, Minister of Defence and Leon Panetta, Secretary of Defense of the United States.
- Innovations
- Rule of Law
