= María Teresa Kumar =

Colombian American political rights activist

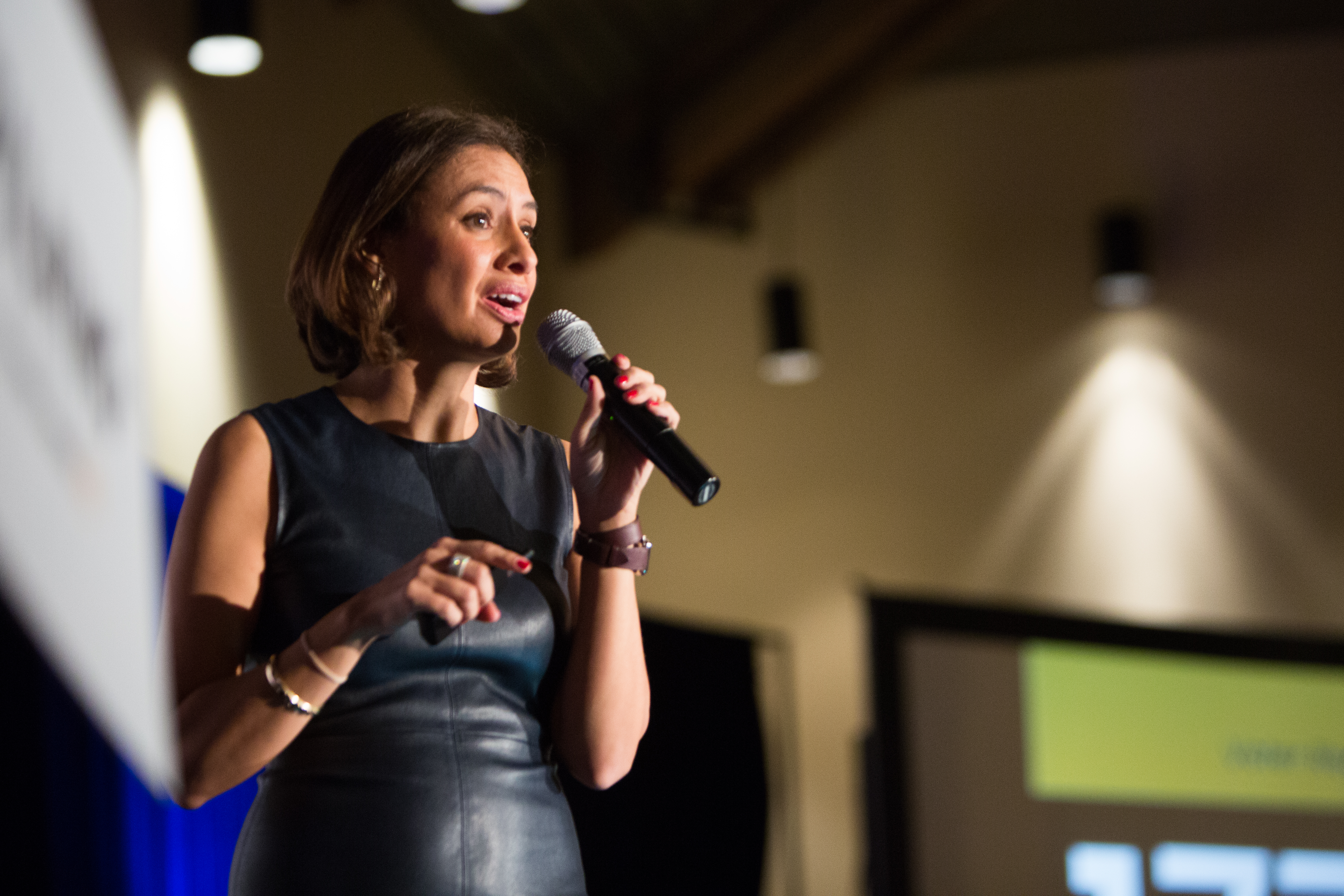
- Kumar in 2017
- Born: María Teresa Petersen; 1974 (age 51–52); Bogota, Colombia
- Education: University of California, Davis; John F. Kennedy School of Government
- Occupations: Political activist, CEO and president of Voto Latino
- Spouse: Raj Kumar
- Website: Voto Latino Website

María Teresa Kumar (née Petersen; born 1974) is a Colombian-American political rights activist who serves as president and CEO of the Latino political organization Voto Latino. In 2013, Elle called Kumar one of the ten most influential women in Washington, D.C..

== Early life and education ==
Maria Teresa Petersen was born in Bogotá, Colombia, in 1974, and grew up in Sonoma, California. Kumar spent her summers in Colombia when she was young.

Kumar attended the University of California, Davis where she earned a BA in International Relations. She obtained a master's degree in Public Policy from the John F. Kennedy School of Government at Harvard University.

== Career ==
Kumar began her career as a legislative aide to Democratic U.S. representative Vic Fazio. She later attended the John F. Kennedy School of Government at Harvard University, where she recognized the importance of technology in improving the gap in equality in Latino lives. She began working with Latino advocacy group Voto Latino in 2004. Currently based in Washington, D.C., the organization uses marketing campaigns and technology to encourage Latinos to participate in the political process.

In the beginning, Voto Latino's mission was to increase voter registration among Latinos in the U.S. Later, Voto Latino partnered with the U.S. Census Bureau to increase participation in the 2010 United States census. "To spread the word, Voto Latino and MTV’s Latino channel Tr3s aired public service announcements, created a hashtag on Twitter and established a nationwide network of bloggers". Kumar and her team also launched the 'Be Counted' campaign, which included a bilingual mobile phone app which enabled Latinos to fill out the 2010 census on their phones. The organization is also currently assisting Latinos in navigating the health exchanges associated with the Affordable Care Act.

Under Kumar's direction, Voto Latino played a primary role in registering over half a million new Latino voters. In June 2018, the organization announced that it has set a new goal of registering one million voters by 2020 and is planning to spend $7 million on the project.

Kumar is a senior fellow at the Kettering Foundation, an American non-partisan research foundation.

== Awards and recognition ==
In 2010, Kumar was the recipient of an Emmy nomination in the Outstanding News Discussion and Analysis category for her role as co-creator and host of the two hour MSNBC television special, Beyond Borderlines. It was the first televised English-speaking town hall which focused on Latino issues in the United States and the emerging role of Latinos in politics.

In 2013, Kumar was named by Elle as one of the ten most influential women in Washington D.C. In 2017, Kumar was named by Hispanic Business among the 100 most influential Latinos in America.

She was named a National Women's History Alliance Honoree in 2020. and in 2025 received a Carnegie Corporation of New York Great Immigrant Award
