= South Ural State Medical University =

Medical school in Chelyabinsk, Russia

Coordinates: 55.1399°N 61.3726°E

South Ural State Medical University (Russian: Южно-Уральский государственный медицинский университет) is a public university in Chelyabinsk, Russia. The school was founded in 1943. The school has 240 bachelor’s programs, 150 master’s programs, over 20 specialist programs, and 86 post-graduate studies programs.

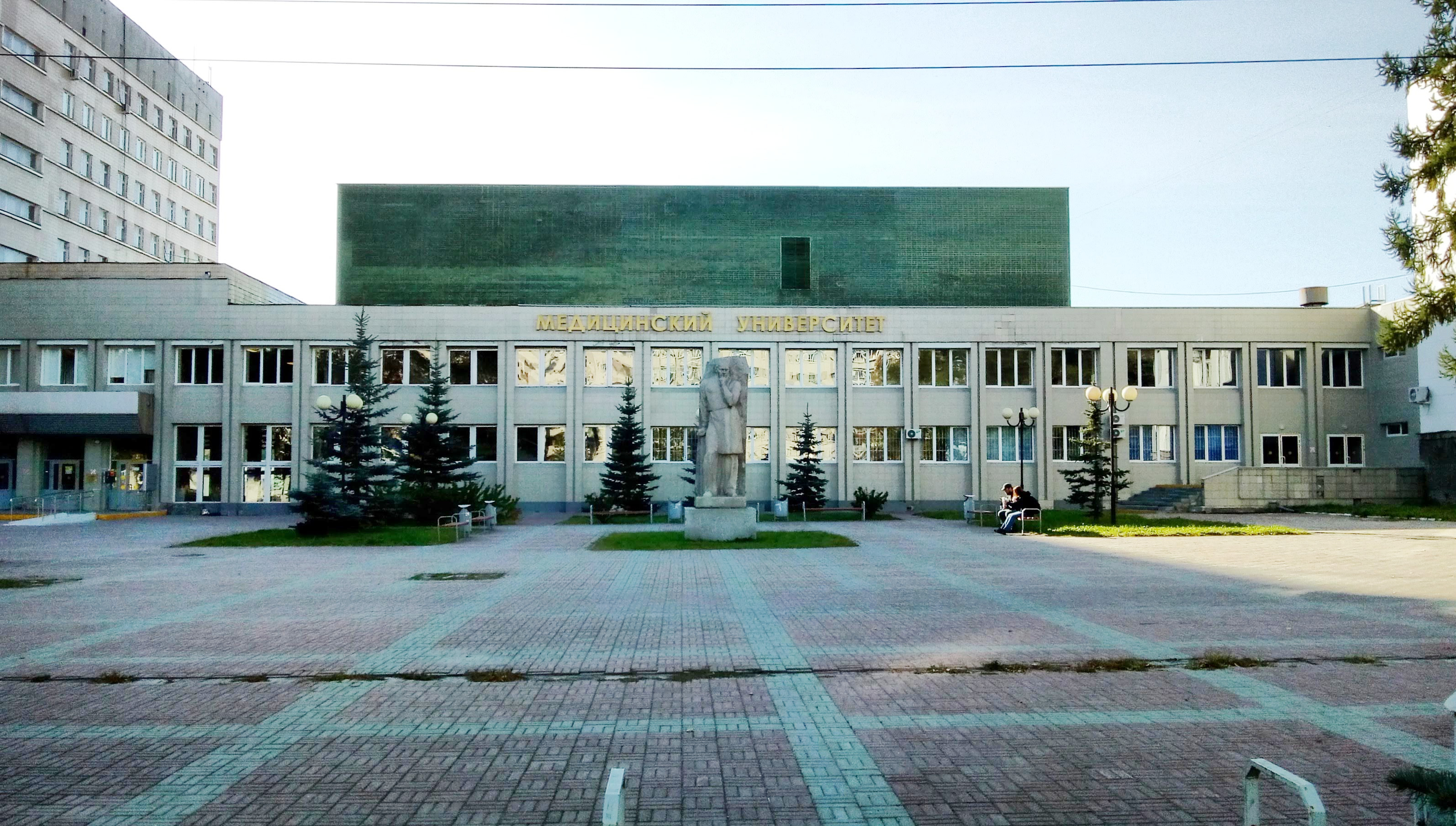

== History ==
Chelyabinsk State Medical Institute was established by the Order of the People's Commissariat of Health of the USSR No. 403 from June 28, 1944 on the basis of the medical Institute evacuated from Kiev and with the assistance of Prof. B. N. Uskov sent from Moscow. After the transfer of the Kiev Medical Institute back to Kiev in Chelyabinsk, 147 teachers and staff remained, including 7 doctors of sciences, 31 candidates of sciences, and 10 postgraduate students. Professor Alexander Nikolayevich Fedorovsky was appointed the first director of the Institute, who remained in this position until 1950.
