= William G. Hyland =

United States Deputy National Security Advisor
- In office November 3, 1975 – January 20, 1977
- President: Gerald Ford
- Preceded by: Brent Scowcroft
- Succeeded by: David L. Aaron

5th Director of the Bureau of Intelligence and Research
- In office January 21, 1974 – November 24, 1975
- Preceded by: Ray S. Cline
- Succeeded by: Harold H. Saunders

Personal details
- Born: January 18, 1929 Kansas City, Missouri
- Died: March 25, 2008 (aged 79) Falls Church, Virginia, U.S.
- Education: Washington University in St. Louis (BA); University of Missouri-Kansas City (MA)
- Known for: Editor of Foreign Affairs

William George Hyland (January 18, 1929 – March 25, 2008) was Deputy National Security Advisor to President of the United States Gerald Ford and editor of Foreign Affairs magazine.

== Early life and education ==
William G. Hyland was born in Kansas City, Missouri in 1929. He was educated at the Washington University in St. Louis, where he was a member of Tau Kappa Epsilon fraternity, graduating with a B.A. in History. After college, he spent 1950–53 in the 2nd Armored Division of the United States Army; during this time, he was stationed in West Germany. He did graduate work at the University of Missouri–Kansas City, receiving an M.A. in History in 1954.

== Central Intelligence Agency ==
After graduating, Hyland joined the Central Intelligence Agency. He was initially assigned to the CIA's Berlin desk, and in this capacity frequently briefed Director of Central Intelligence Allen Welsh Dulles. He was later assigned to the Soviet desk, where he gained a reputation as a skilled Kremlinologist. In 1960, he wrote a memorandum in which he predicted that Nikita Khrushchev would come up with a pretext to avoid an upcoming Paris summit with President Dwight D. Eisenhower. Shortly before the summit, the Soviets shot down a U-2 spy plane and Khrushchev used this as a pretext for walking out of the summit. Hyland was still a CIA agent when his first book, The Fall of Khrushchev, was published in 1968.

== National Security Advisor ==
In 1969, Hyland was appointed as a member of the United States National Security Council. During his time as an NSC member, he accompanied United States Secretary of State Henry Kissinger and President Richard Nixon to a summit in Moscow.

Hyland played a key role in negotiating the Strategic Arms Limitation Talks (SALT I)

In 1973, President Nixon named Hyland as Director of the Bureau of Intelligence and Research and Hyland held this office from January 21, 1974 until November 24, 1975.

In 1975, President Ford named Brent Scowcroft as National Security Advisor. Hyland was made Deputy National Security Advisor, holding this office until 1977.

Following the election of President Jimmy Carter, in 1977 Hyland left government service. He worked at the Center for Strategic and International Studies at Georgetown University and at the Carnegie Endowment for International Peace.

== Foreign Affairs ==
From 1983 to 1992, Hyland was the editor of Foreign Affairs magazine. He wrote a half-dozen books, on both the topics of international affairs and, after retirement, popular American music. During the presidency of George H. W. Bush, he was a member of the President's Foreign Intelligence Advisory Board. With the ending of the Cold War, Hyland advocated a period of American disengagement with world affairs.

== Death ==
Hyland died of an aortic aneurysm at Inova Fairfax Hospital on March 25, 2008.

== Books ==
- The Fall of Khrushchev (1968)
- Mortal Rivals: Superpower Relations from Nixon to Reagan (1987)
- The Cold War Is Over (1990)
- The Song Is Ended: Songwriters and American Music, 1900-1950 (1995)
- Richard Rodgers (1998)
- Clinton's World: Remaking American Foreign Policy (1999)
- George Gershwin: A New Biography (2003)

== Sources ==
- Patricia Sullivan, "William G. Hyland; Editor, Advised Ford On Security", Washington Post, Mar. 28, 2008
- Appearances on C-SPAN

Government offices
Preceded by Ray S. Cline	Director of the Bureau of Intelligence and Research; January 21, 1974 – November 24, 1975	Succeeded by Harold H. Saunders
Legal offices
Preceded by Brent Scowcroft	Deputy National Security Adviser; 1975–1977	Succeeded by David L. Aaron
