= Vitaly Naumkin =

Russian scholar

- Виталий Вячеславович Наумкин
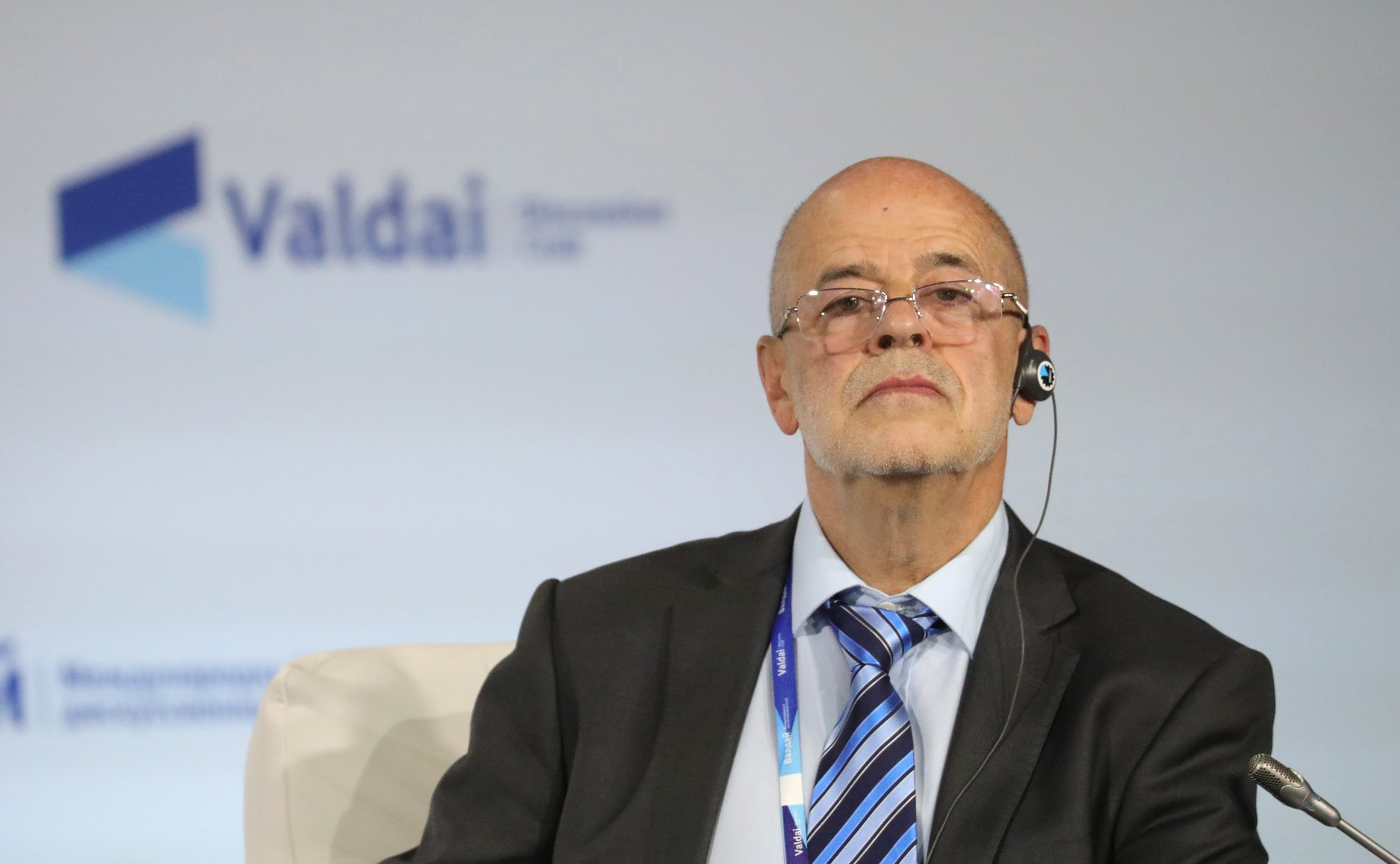
- Naumkin in 2019
- Born: 21 May 1945 (age 80); Ekaterinburg, Urals, Russia
- Education: Moscow State University

Vitaliy Vyacheslavovich Naumkin (Russian: Виталий Вячеславович Наумкин, Arabic: فيتالي فياتشيسلافوفيتش ناؤمكين); born 21 May 1945) is a Russian scholar of Central Asia and The Middle East. Naumkin graduated with honors from Moscow State University from the Institute of Asia and Africa, where he studied Arabic and Arab culture. He then served in the Soviet army from 1968 to 1970 as an officer and Arabic teacher.

== Career ==
Naumkin earned his PhD from Moscow State University in 1972, writing his dissertation on medieval Islamic theologian Abu Hamid al-Ghazali. In 1980, he released a translation of al-Ghazali's work.

In 1984, Naumkin joined the Institute of Oriental Studies at the Russian Academy of Sciences as head of the department of Arab countries. In 1989, he became deputy director of the institute. In 1994, Naumkin began serving as the director of the center for Arab studies.

In May 2009, Naumkin was made director of the Institute of Oriental Studies at the Russian Academy of Sciences. He was also elected a corresponding member of the Russian Academy of Sciences in 2011. Additionally, Naumkin is a professor in the faculty of World Politics at Moscow State University. He is also the Editor-in-Chief of the “Vostok-ORIENS” Journal of the RAS and President of the Center for Strategic and Political Studies. In total, Naumkin has authored more than 500 publications on the history of Asia, the Arab world, Central Asia, the Caucus, political science, Islamic theology, international relations, philology, conflict management, and resolution.
