= Inter-Tajik Dialogue =

The Inter-Tajik Dialogue was an effort of Track II diplomacy which brought together factions of the Tajik Civil War. The Inter-Tajik Dialogue developed out of former diplomat Hal Saunders' work with the Dartmouth Conference Regional Conflicts Task Force (RCTF). In 1992 the RCTF decided to apply the process of Sustained Dialogue they had learned in the Dartmouth Conference to aid the former-Soviet republic through citizen dialogues.

Established in 1993, the Inter-Tajik Dialogue was fostered by international interest, and was chaired alternately between the Russians and Americans. The Inter-Tajik Dialogue met 35 times by their tenth anniversary in 2003.

The first joint memorandum was released by dialogue participants in March 1994. Official negotiations began the next month.

The May 1996 joint memorandum states: "Participants believe that the primary obstacle to peace in Tajikistan is the absence of an adequate understanding on sharing power among the regions, political parties and movements, and nationalities in Tajikistan."

The Inter-Tajik Dialogue met until 2000. Observers are unsure of just how much impact the Dialogue had on cementing the final peace, but agree that it was an important component.

== Sources ==
- Searching for Peace in Central and South Asia: An Overview of Conflict Prevention and Peacebuilding Activities. Eds. Monique Mekenkamp, Paul van Tongeren, and Hans van de Veen.
- Summary of the Dialogue
