= Kettering Foundation =

American research foundation based in Ohio

Charles F. Kettering Foundation
- Abbreviation: Kettering Foundation
- Formation: 1927
- Type: Foundation (nonprofit)
- Legal status: 501(c)(3)
- Headquarters: Dayton, Ohio, United States
- President and CEO: Sharon L. Davies
- Key people: John R. Dedrick
- Revenue: $15,326,258 (2023)
- Expenses: $19,655,231 (2023)
- Website: kettering.org

The Kettering Foundation is a United States-based nonpartisan research foundation founded in 1927 by Charles F. Kettering. The foundation believes that "all people belong and have the right to engage in and shape a democracy that serves them."

== History ==
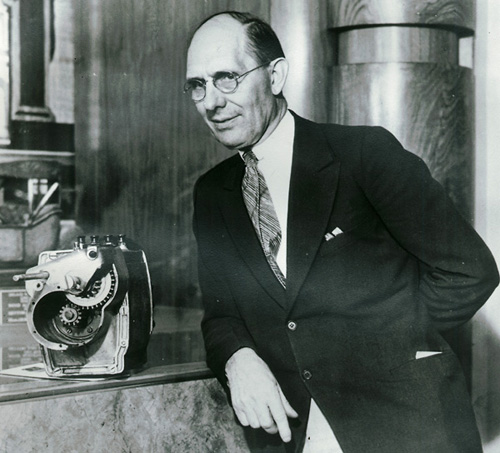
Charles F. Kettering, pictured with his first electric starter

The foundation was established in 1927 in Dayton, Ohio, with the mission of conducting scientific research for the betterment of humanity. Founded by Charles Franklin Kettering, a prolific inventor and former General Motors executive, the foundation initially focused on areas aligned with his interests, including science education, energy conservation, and medical research. Dayton, a hub of innovation, was a fitting home for the foundation, given its connection to pioneering advancements such as the Wright brothers’ early aviation work.

After Kettering's passing in 1958, the foundation expanded its focus to address societal needs, shifting its research toward primary and secondary education. By 1968, it moved away from traditional grantmaking to concentrate on its own research, with prominent figures such as George Gallup and Norman Cousins influencing its direction. This period saw the foundation explore topics such as citizen participation, international relations, and the role of journalism in public discourse.

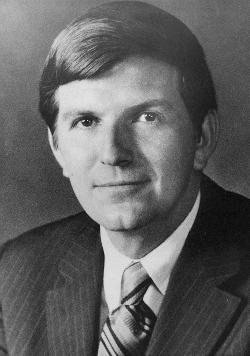
F. David Mathews

In the 1980s, under the leadership of F. David Mathews, the foundation deepened its commitment to democratic engagement by experimenting with public deliberation, bringing citizens together to discuss pressing societal issues. It also collaborated with educators and community leaders to explore the role of active citizenship in democracy. As it entered the 21st century, the foundation refined its research around the question of how to make democracy function effectively.

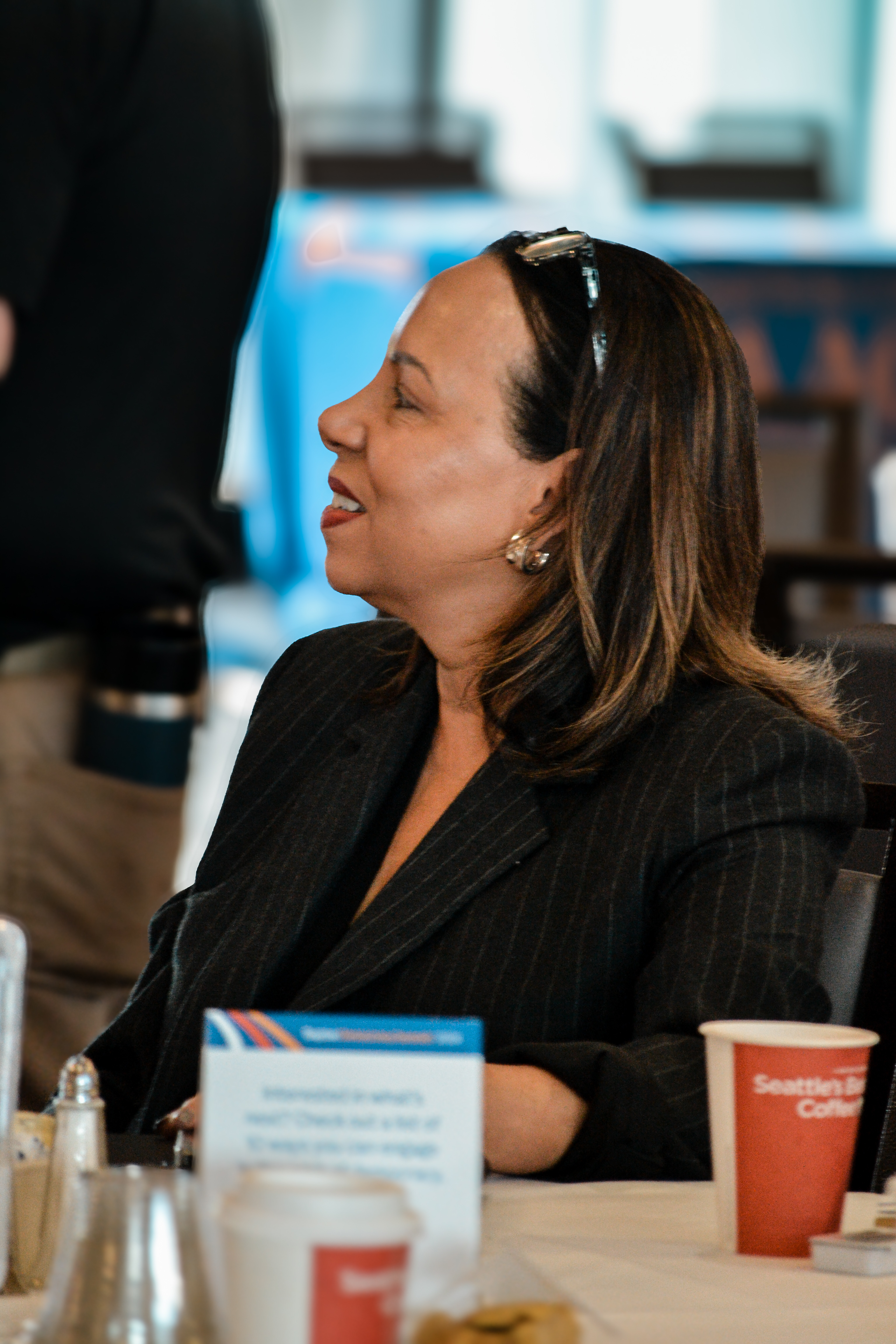
Sharon L. Davies

Today, under the leadership of Sharon L. Davies, it continues to champion inclusive democracy by fostering citizen engagement, ensuring government accountability, and resisting authoritarianism.

The institution is a member of the Strategic Ohio Council for Higher Education (SOCHE).

== Leadership ==
The foundation's president and CEO since April 2022 is Sharon L. Davies. She succeeded F. David Mathews who presided over the foundation from 1981 to 2022. Past notable board members have included Lisle Carter, Jr., Katherine W. Fanning, Mary Futrell, Daniel Kemmis, and Daniel Yankelovich.

Current board members:

- Sharon L. Davies, president and CEO
- Ed Dorn
- Beverly Wade Hogan
- Les Ihara Jr.
- Peter Levine
- Sherry Magill (chair)
- Hank Meijer
- Suzanne Morse Moomaw
- Edwin C. Moses
- Kelley Robinson
- Roberto Saba

== Focus areas ==
The foundation has five primary research focus areas:

1. Defending Inclusive Democracy
2. Information for a Democratic Society
3. Democracy and Community
4. Democracy and the Arts
5. Democracy around the Globe

== Fellowships ==
The foundation awards several fellowships to support its mission. Kettering Foundation fellows are distinguished global leaders and experts dedicated to addressing the most pressing challenges facing democracy.

=== The Katherine W. Fanning Fellowship in Journalism and Democracy ===
Named in honor Katherine "Kay" W. Fanning, a trailblazing newspaper editor and publisher who played a significant role on the Kettering Foundation's board of directors for 12 years, including serving as chair from 1994 to 1996.

In August 2023, the foundation awarded its Katherine W. Fanning Fellowship in Journalism and Democracy to Judy Woodruff, veteran correspondent and former anchor and managing editor of PBS News Hour.

=== The Charles F. Kettering Global Fellowship ===
The Charles F. Kettering Global Fellowship brings together international leaders from fields like academia, civil society, and journalism to support the foundation’s work on democracy.

List of 2026 Charles F. Kettering Global Fellows:

- Clare Byarugaba
- Patrick Gathara
- Julia Neiva
- Urban Strandberg
- Kristóf Szombati

=== The David Mathews Democracy Fellowship Award ===
Named in honor of David Mathews, who served as the foundation's president and CEO from 1981 to 2022.

In August 2023, the foundation awarded its first David Mathews Democracy Fellowship to Kathleen Sebelius, former governor of Kansas and a cabinet member in the Obama administration.

=== The Ruth Yellowhawk Fellowship ===
Named in honor of Ruth Yellowhawk, who was a radio journalist and storyteller dedicated to community-centered reporting. She worked with the foundation from 1997 to 2010. In January 2025, the foundation awarded its Ruth Yellowhawk Fellowship to American Poet Laureate Joy Harjo.

=== Senior fellows ===
Kettering Foundation senior fellows collaborate with the foundation to further its mission of promoting inclusive democracy. List of 2026 Kettering Foundation Senior Fellows:

- Stacey Abrams
- William J. Barber II
- Ruth Ben-Ghiat
- Johnnetta Betsch Cole
- James Comey
- David French
- Neal Katyal
- William Kristol
- María Teresa Kumar
- Steven Levitsky
- Sarah Longwell
- J. Michael Luttig
- Maureen O’Connor
- Timothy Snyder
