= List of ambassadors of the United States to Bolivia =

Ambassador of the United States to Bolivia
- Seal of the United States Department of State

- Flag of a United States ambassador

- Incumbent; Amanda Porter; Chargé d'Affaires since September 25, 2026
- Nominator: The president of the United States
- Appointer: The president; with Senate advice and consent
- Inaugural holder: John Appleton as Chargé d'Affaires
- Formation: January 3, 1849
- Website: U.S. Embassy - La Paz

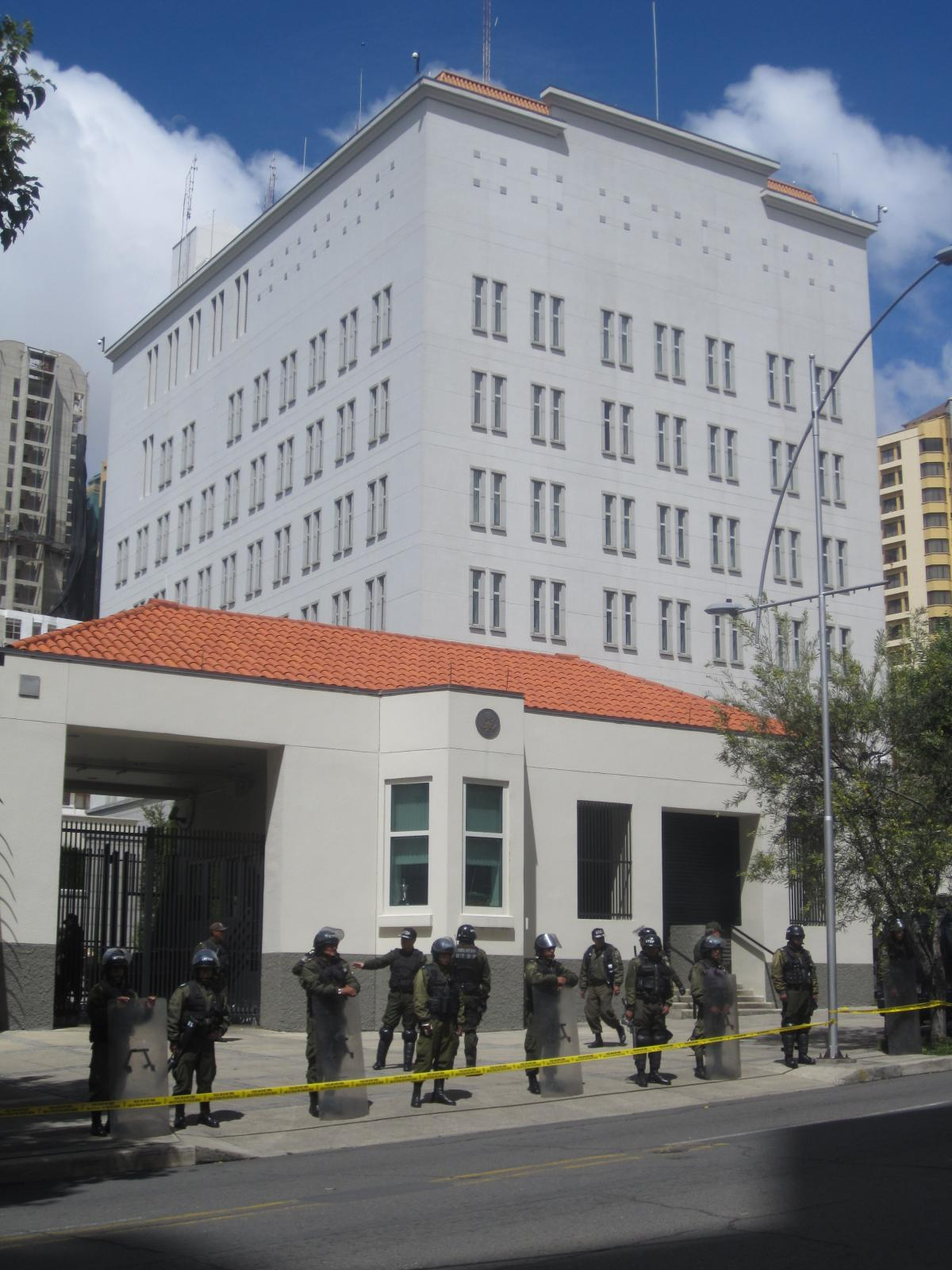
The Embassy of the United States in La Paz, Bolivia, where the Ambassador lives

The following is a list of envoys, ministers, and ambassadors that the United States has sent to Bolivia. As a point of note, the first Ambassador of the United States to Bolivia was John Appleton, who served as the charge d'Affaires from January 3, 1849, to May 4, 1849. Since September 15, 2008, there has been no official Ambassador with the office being held by a chargé d'Affaires.

== List ==
No.	Name	Title(s)	Term start	Term finish
1	John Appleton	Chargé d'Affaires	January 3, 1849	May 4, 1849
2	Alexander Keith McClung	Chargé d'Affaires	July 3, 1850	1851
3	Horace H. Miller	Chargé d'Affaires	December 18, 1852	January 1854
4	John W. Dana	Chargé d'Affaires; Minister Resident	February 23, 1854	March 10, 1859
5	John Cotton Smith	Minister Resident	March 10, 1859	May 1, 1861
6	David K. Cartter	Minister Resident	July 28, 1861	March 10, 1863
7	Allen A. Hall	Minister Resident	September 4, 1863	May 18, 1867
8	John W. Caldwell	Minister Resident	November 2, 1868	July 25, 1869
9	Leopold Markbreit	Minister Resident	July 25, 1869	February 12, 1873
10	John T. Croxton	Minister Resident	April 9, 1873	April 16, 1874
11	Robert M. Reynolds	Minister Resident	January 30, 1875	October 11, 1876
12	Solomon Newton Pettis	Minister Resident; Consul General	June 2, 1879	October 30, 1879
13	Charles Adams	Minister Resident; Consul General	July 8, 1880	August 29, 1882
14	George Maney	Minister Resident; Consul General	November 4, 1882	June 1, 1883
15	Richard Gibbs	Minister Resident; Consul General	October 16, 1883	September 11, 1885
16	William A. Seay	Minister Resident; Consul General	September 19, 1885	April 12, 1887
17	S. S. Carlisle	Minister Resident; Consul General	January 17, 1888	December 16, 1889
18	Thomas H. Anderson	Minister Resident; Consul General; Envoy Extraordinary and Minister Plenipotentiary	December 16, 1889	November 22, 1892
19	Frederic J. Grant	Envoy Extraordinary and Minister Plenipotentiary	April 12, 1893	October 24, 1893
20	Thomas Moonlight	Envoy Extraordinary and Minister Plenipotentiary	April 14, 1894	January 8, 1898
21	George H. Bridgman	Envoy Extraordinary and Minister Plenipotentiary	July 4, 1898	January 13, 1902
22	William B. Sorsby	Envoy Extraordinary and Minister Plenipotentiary	October 4, 1902	March 16, 1908
23	James F. Stutesman	Envoy Extraordinary and Minister Plenipotentiary	September 8, 1908	April 15, 1910
24	Horace G. Knowles	Envoy Extraordinary and Minister Plenipotentiary	December 28, 1910	August 23, 1913
25	John D. O'Rear	Envoy Extraordinary and Minister Plenipotentiary	August 31, 1913	July 14, 1918
26	S. Abbot Maginnis	Envoy Extraordinary and Minister Plenipotentiary	January 14, 1920	December 5, 1921
27	Jesse S. Cottrell	Envoy Extraordinary and Minister Plenipotentiary	January 6, 1922	January 26, 1928
28	David E. Kaufman	Envoy Extraordinary and Minister Plenipotentiary	May 30, 1928	January 10, 1929
29	Edward F. Feely	Envoy Extraordinary and Minister Plenipotentiary	September 23, 1930	September 29, 1933
30	Fay A. Des Portes	Envoy Extraordinary and Minister Plenipotentiary	November 15, 1933	May 1, 1936
31	Raymond Henry Norweb	Envoy Extraordinary and Minister Plenipotentiary	August 10, 1936	June 15, 1937
32	Robert Granville Caldwell	Envoy Extraordinary and Minister Plenipotentiary	August 21, 1937	June 23, 1939
33	Douglas Jenkins	Envoy Extraordinary and Minister Plenipotentiary	October 26, 1939	October 3, 1941
34	Pierre de Lagarde Boal	Ambassador Extraordinary and Plenipotentiary	May 23, 1942	February 5, 1944 (Note: Normal relations interrupted on December 20, 1943. The new Government of Bolivia was still unrecognized by the United States when Boal left post on February 5, 1944.)
35	Walter C. Thurston	Ambassador Extraordinary and Plenipotentiary	November 16, 1944	January 3, 1946
36	Joseph Flack	Ambassador Extraordinary and Plenipotentiary	July 15, 1946	May 17, 1949
37	Irving Florman	Ambassador Extraordinary and Plenipotentiary	February 27, 1950	September 4, 1951
38	Edward J. Sparks	Ambassador Extraordinary and Plenipotentiary	June 13, 1952	October 29, 1954
	Gerald A. Drew	Ambassador Extraordinary and Plenipotentiary	December 8, 1954	April 6, 1957
	Philip Bonsal	Ambassador Extraordinary and Plenipotentiary	May 10, 1957	February 6, 1959
	Carl W. Strom	Ambassador Extraordinary and Plenipotentiary	May 4, 1959	May 8, 1961
	Ben S. Stephansky	Ambassador Extraordinary and Plenipotentiary	June 29, 1961	October 15, 1963
	Douglas Henderson	Ambassador Extraordinary and Plenipotentiary	December 7, 1963	August 6, 1968
	Raúl Héctor Castro	Ambassador Extraordinary and Plenipotentiary	September 3, 1968	November 3, 1969
	Ernest V. Siracusa	Ambassador Extraordinary and Plenipotentiary	December 5, 1969	July 30, 1973
	William Perry Stedman, Jr.	Ambassador Extraordinary and Plenipotentiary	October 3, 1973	June 23, 1977
	Paul H. Boeker	Ambassador Extraordinary and Plenipotentiary	October 26, 1977	February 17, 1980
	Marvin Weissman	Ambassador Extraordinary and Plenipotentiary	March 26, 1980	July 17, 1980
	Edwin G. Corr	Ambassador Extraordinary and Plenipotentiary	December 10, 1981	August 9, 1985
	Edward Morgan Rowell	Ambassador Extraordinary and Plenipotentiary	August 20, 1985	January 19, 1988
	Robert S. Gelbard	Ambassador Extraordinary and Plenipotentiary	October 11, 1988	July 20, 1991
	Charles R. Bowers	Ambassador Extraordinary and Plenipotentiary	August 23, 1991	October 7, 1994
	Curtis Warren Kamman	Ambassador Extraordinary and Plenipotentiary	November 16, 1994	November 26, 1997
	Donna Jean Hrinak	Ambassador Extraordinary and Plenipotentiary	January 14, 1998	July 17, 2000
	Manuel Rocha	Ambassador Extraordinary and Plenipotentiary	August 4, 2000	April 27, 2002
	David N. Greenlee	Ambassador Extraordinary and Plenipotentiary	January 17, 2003	May 10, 2006
	Philip S. Goldberg	Ambassador Extraordinary and Plenipotentiary	October 13, 2006	September 14, 2008
	Krishna R. Urs	Chargé d’Affaires a.i	September 15, 2008	June 25, 2009
	James Creagan	Chargé d’Affaires a.i	June 25, 2009	August 28, 2009
	John S. Creamer	Chargé d’Affaires a.i	August 28, 2009	July 13, 2012
	Larry L. Memmott	Chargé d’Affaires a.i	July 14, 2012	February 28, 2014
	Aruna Amirthanayagam	Chargé d’Affaires a.i	February 28, 2014	June 8, 2014
	Peter M. Brennan	Chargé d’Affaires	June 8, 2014	December 17, 2017
	Bruce Williamson	Chargé d’Affaires	December 20, 2017	August 26, 2020
	Charisse Phillips	Chargé d’Affaires	August 26, 2020	October 7, 2022
	Jarahn Hillsman	Chargé d’Affaires	October 7, 2022	June 24, 2023
	Marcos Mandojana	Chargé d’Affaires	June 25, 2023	July 17, 2023
	Joe Tordella	Chargé d’Affaires	July 18, 2023	September 14, 2023
	Debra Hevia	Chargé d’Affaires	September 14, 2023	June 17, 2026
	Erik Martini	Chargé d’Affaires	June 18, 2026	September 25, 2026
	Amanda Porter	Chargé d’Affaires	September 25, 2026	Present

== See also ==
- Bolivia – United States relations
- Foreign relations of Bolivia
- Ambassadors of the United States
