= Bruce Williamson (diplomat) =

American diplomat

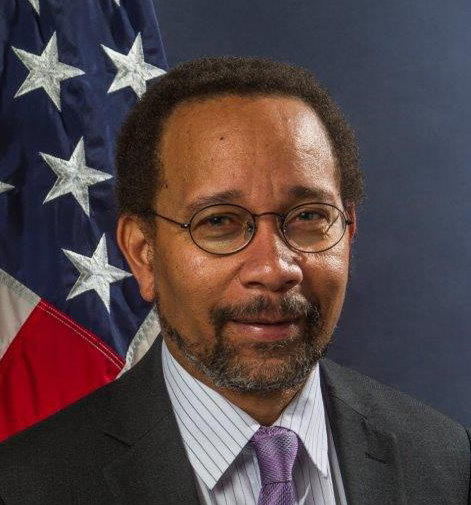

United States Chargé d'affaires to Bolivia
- In office December 20, 2017 – August 26, 2020
- President: Donald Trump
- Preceded by: Peter M. Brennan
- Succeeded by: Charisse Phillips

Personal details
- Born: Philadelphia, Pennsylvania, U.S.
- Children: 1
- Education: Yale University (BA); Harvard Law School (JD); National War College (MD)

Bruce Williamson is an American diplomat who served as the United States' Chargé d'affaires to Bolivia from 2017 to 2020.

== Early life ==
Bruce Williamson was born in Philadelphia, Pennsylvania. He graduated with a Bachelor of Arts from Yale University, a Juris Doctor from Harvard Law School, and a Master's degree from the National War College. He is married and has one child.

== Chargé d'affaires to Bolivia (2017–2020) ==
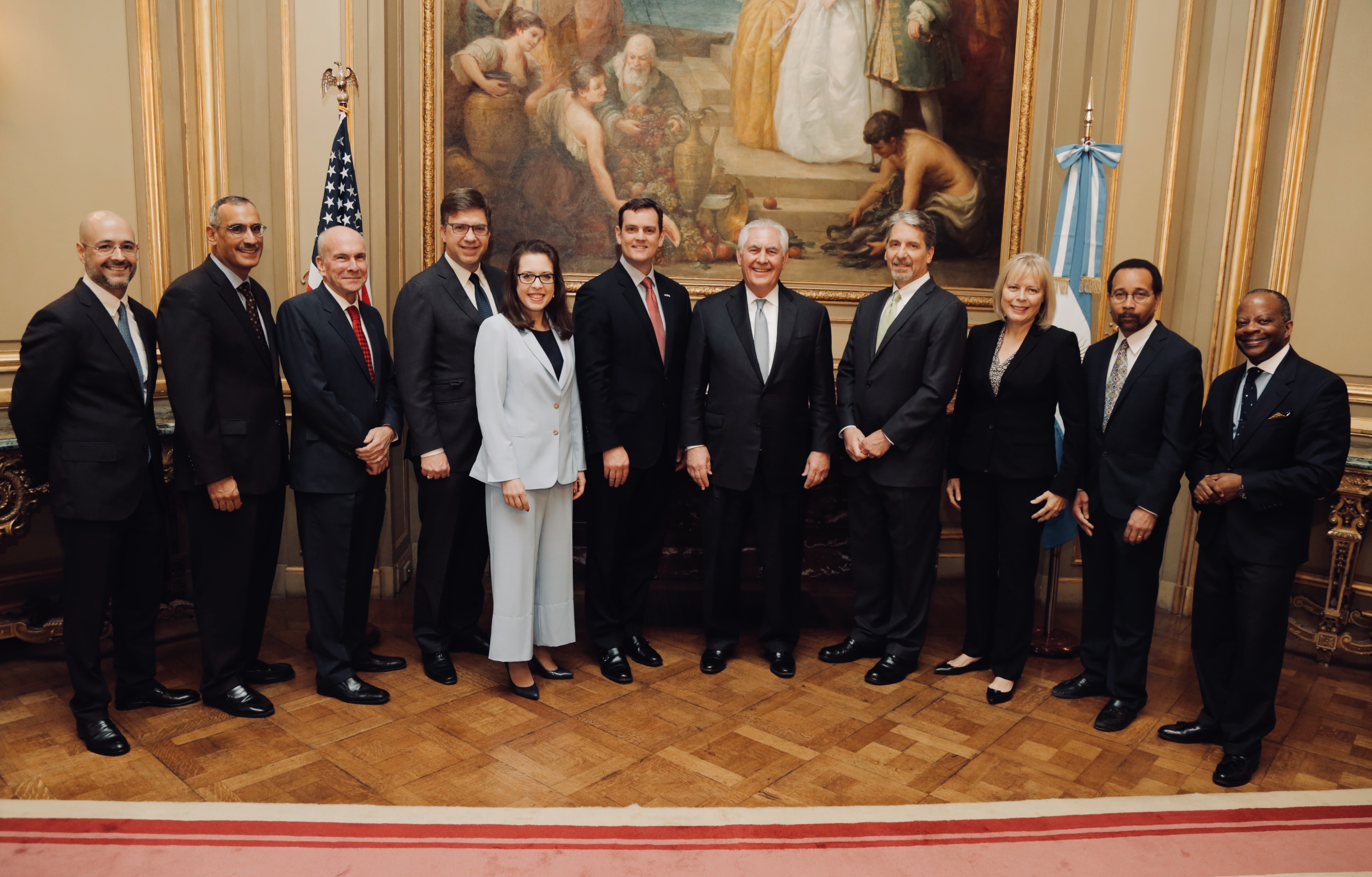
Williamson with Rex Tillerson, and other Ambassadors and Chargé d’Affaires

Williamson served as Deputy Chief of Mission and Chargé d'Affaires in Guatemala, Deputy Chief of Mission in Peru, and Principal Officer in Monterrey, Mexico. From December 2014 to September 2017, Williamson served as the Deputy Assistant Secretary in the Department of State's Bureau of Human Resources.

On December 20, 2017, he arrived in La Paz, Bolivia, and presented his credentials to take the position of the United States' Chargé d'affaires to Bolivia.

Diplomatic posts
Preceded by Peter M. Brennan	United States Chargé d'affaires to Bolivia; 2017-2020	Succeeded by Charisse Phillips
