= Ministry of Foreign Affairs (Bolivia) =

Government ministry of Bolivia

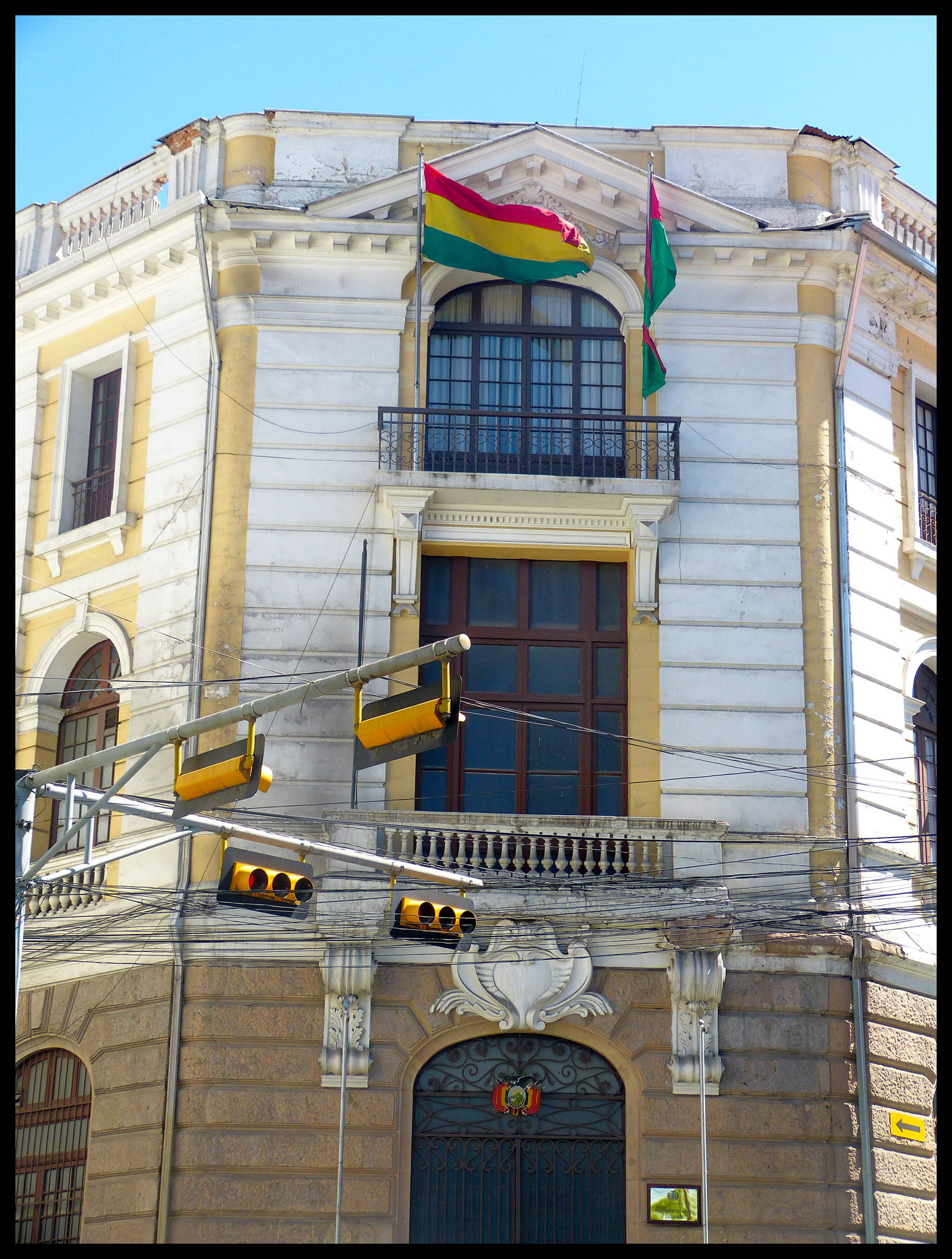
Office in La Paz

The Ministry of Foreign Affairs (Spanish: Ministerio de Relaciones Exteriores) is a Bolivian government ministry which oversees the foreign relations of Bolivia. The minister since 9 November 2025 is Fernando Hugo Aramayo Carrasco.

== Embassies ==
- Embassy of Bolivia, London in the United Kingdom
- Embassy of Bolivia, Paris in France
- Embassy of Bolivia, Washington, D.C. in the United States
