= Douglas Henderson =

Douglas Henderson may refer to:

- Douglas Henderson (SNP politician) (1935–2006), Scottish National Party politician
- Douglas Henderson (ambassador) (1914–2010), American diplomat
- Douglas Henderson (actor) (1919–1978), American actor
- Douglas Mackay Henderson (1927–2007), Scottish botanist
- Doug Henderson (Labour politician) (born 1949), British Labour Party politician
- Doug Henderson (artist) (born 1949), American illustrator and artist
- Doug Henderson (footballer) (1913–2002), English professional footballer
- Doug Henderson (musician) (born 1960), American musician and recording engineer
- Dougie Henderson, musician, member of Marmalade
- Jocko Henderson (Douglas Henderson, 1918–2000), American radio personality
