= Charisse Phillips =

American diplomat

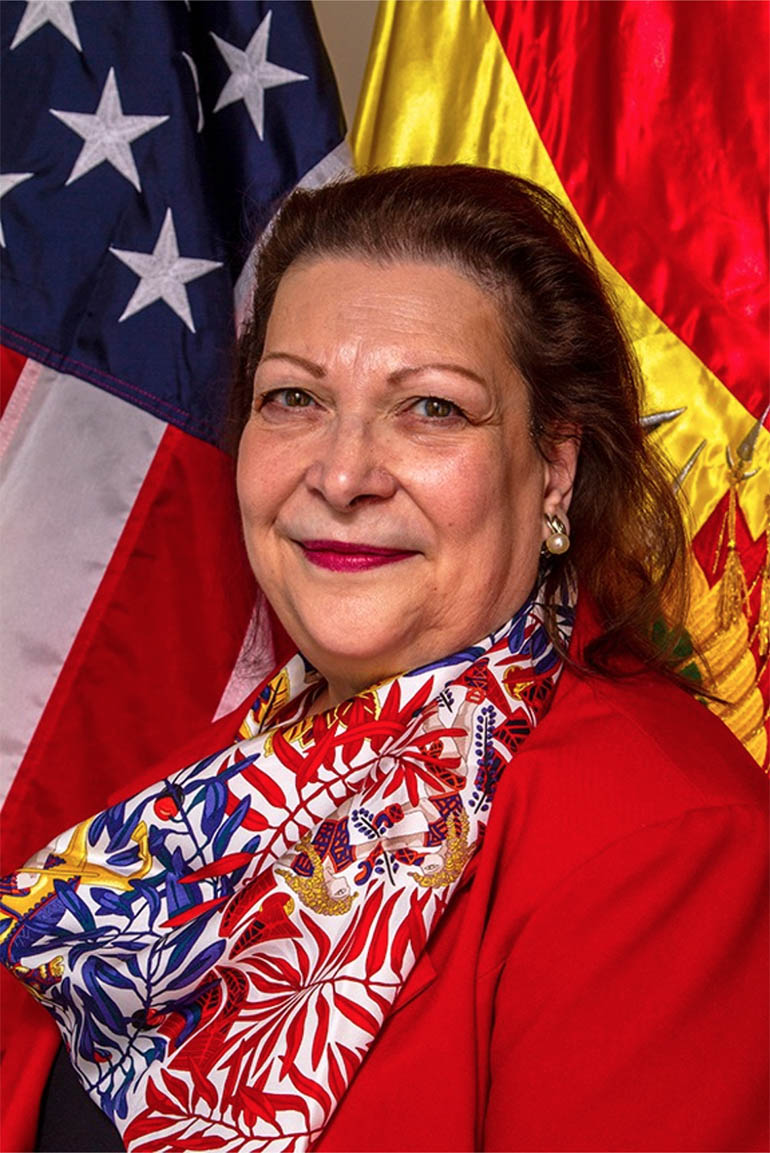

United States Chargé d'affaires to Bolivia
- In office August 26, 2020 – October 7, 2022
- President: Donald Trump; Joe Biden
- Preceded by: Bruce Williamson
- Succeeded by: Jarahn Hillsman

Personal details
- Born: Frankfurt, Germany
- Spouse: Gregory Phillips
- Children: 2
- Education: College of William and Mary; University of Virginia

Charisse Phillips is an American diplomat who served as the United States Chargé d'affaires to Bolivia from August 2020 to October 2022.

== Biography ==
Charisse Phillips was born in Frankfurt, Germany. Phillips holds a bachelor's degree in philosophy and government from the College of William & Mary and a Master of Arts in foreign affairs from the University of Virginia. She is married to retired Foreign Service Officer Gregory Phillips. They have two sons. Her primary foreign languages are German and Spanish.

== Chargé d'affaires to Bolivia (2020–2022) ==
Charisse Phillips joined the Foreign Service in 1986 after working at the U.S. Embassy in Mexico City, with her subsequent postings including Madrid, Spain; Hamburg, Germany; and San Salvador, El Salvador. Phillips completed an assignment as minister counselor for consular affairs in New Delhi, India. Before that, she served as senior advisor for hostage affairs in the Bureau of Consular Affairs at the United States Department of State. She served as deputy chief of mission at the embassy in Guatemala City from 2014 to 2017 and as the deputy principal officer in Frankfurt, Germany, from 2011 to 2014. Other postings include assessor in the Office of the Board of Examiners; consul general in Lima, Peru, and in Vienna, Austria; and director of the Office of Fraud Prevention Programs.

On August 26, 2020, she arrived in La Paz as the chargé d'affaires to Bolivia. She headed the Presidential Delegation to the inauguration of Luis Arce on November 8 and expressed optimism in bilateral relations with the Arce administration despite "differences." On December 10, 2020, Phillips met with Foreign Minister Rogelio Mayta and discussed rapprochement between the two countries and the building of a "respectful relationship between our countries and expanding business opportunities."

Diplomatic posts
Preceded by Bruce Williamson	United States Chargé d'affaires to Bolivia; 2020–2022	Succeeded by Jarahn Hillsman
