= David N. Greenlee =

American diplomat (born 1943)

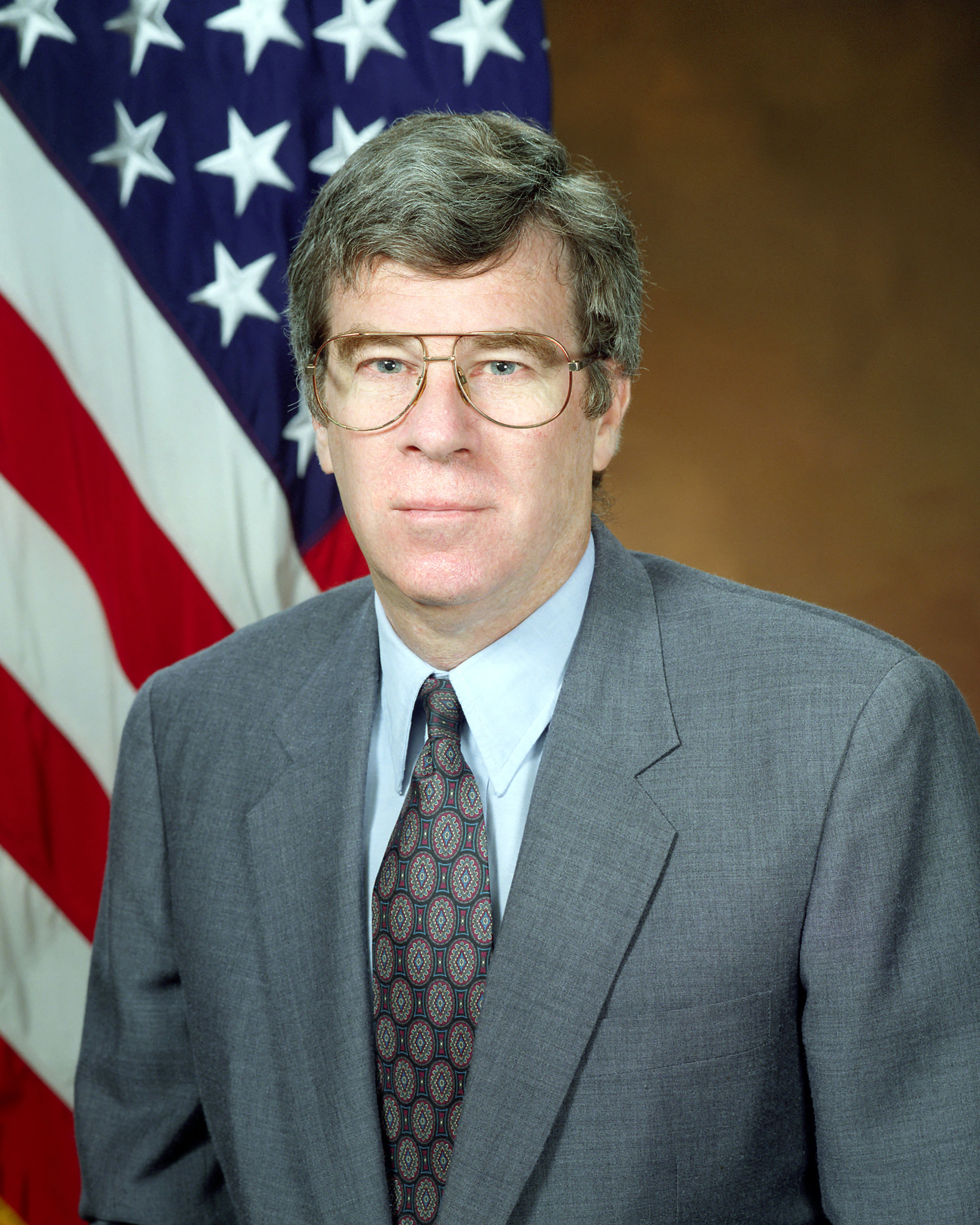
- Official portrait, 1995

United States Ambassador to Bolivia
- In office January 17, 2003 – May 10, 2006
- President: George W. Bush
- Preceded by: Manuel Rocha
- Succeeded by: Philip Goldberg

United States Ambassador to Paraguay
- In office July 19, 2000 – January 15, 2003
- President: Bill Clinton; George W. Bush
- Preceded by: Maura Harty
- Succeeded by: John F. Keane

Personal details
- Born: June 3, 1943 (age 82) White Plains, New York, U.S.
- Education: Yale University

Military service
- Allegiance: United States
- Branch/service: United States Army
- Years of service: 1968—1971
- Battles/wars: Vietnam War

David N. Greenlee (born June 3, 1943) is an American diplomat who served as the U.S. Ambassador to Paraguay between July 19, 2000, and January 15, 2003, and Ambassador to Bolivia between January 17, 2003, and May 10, 2006.

== Early life ==
David Nicol Greenlee was born on June 3, 1943, in White Plains, New York. Greenlee graduated from Yale University in 1965. Greenlee served in the Peace Corps between September 1965 and September 1967. Greenlee served in the United States Army between 1968 and 1971, with the rank of a First Lieutenant, being deployed to Vietnam between September 1969 and September 1970. Greenlee received the Bronze Star Medal and Vietnam Service Medal while serving in the army.

== Diplomatic career ==
Greenlee entered the United States Foreign Service in 1974. From 1987 to 1989, he served as Deputy chief of mission to Bolivia. From 1989 to 1992, he served as Deputy chief of mission to Chile. From 1992 to 1995, he served as Deputy chief of mission to Spain. From July 19, 2000, to January 15, 2003, Greenlee served as the United States Ambassador to Paraguay. From January 17, 2003, to May 10, 2006, Greenlee served as the United States Ambassador to Bolivia.

Diplomatic posts
Preceded by Maura Harty	United States Ambassador to Paraguay; 2001–2003	Succeeded by John F. Keane
Preceded by Manuel Rocha	United States Ambassador to Bolivia; 2003–2006	Succeeded by Philip Goldberg
