= Embassy of Bolivia, Washington, D.C. =

Diplomatic mission of Bolivia in the United States

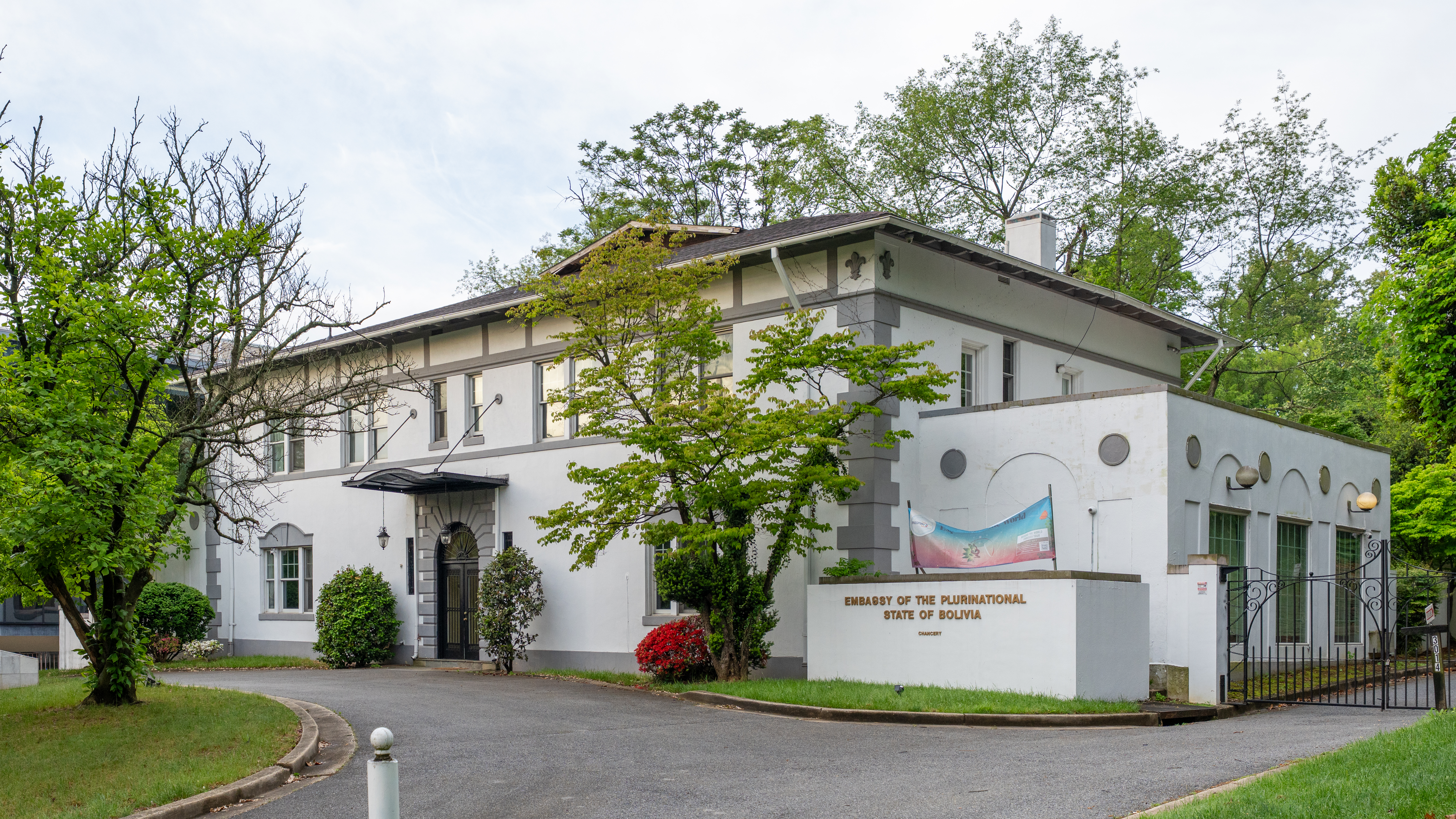
- Location: Washington, D.C.
- Address: 3014 Massachusetts Avenue, N.W.
- Coordinates: 38°55′9″N 77°3′39″W
- Ambassador: Henry Baldelomar Chávez

The Embassy of Bolivia in Washington, D.C. is the diplomatic mission of Bolivia to the United States. It is located at 3014 Massachusetts Avenue, Northwest, Washington, D.C., in the Embassy Row neighborhood.

The embassy also operates Consulates-General at 4420 Connecticut Avenue N.W., Suite #2 Washington, D.C., in Miami, Los Angeles, and New York City.

The current ambassador of Bolivia is chargés d'affaires Henry Baldelomar Chávez.

== History ==
The United States and Bolivia first established diplomatic relations in 1837, when the latter was part of the Peru–Bolivian Confederation, which dissolved two years later. Relations resumed in 1848, when John Appleton was appointed chargés d'affaires.

The legation was previously housed at 507 Massachusetts Avenue, later moving to 1633 16th Street NW in the Dupont Circle neighborhood of Washington, D.C. The latter was built in 1890 and designed by W. Bruce Gray, being part of Sixteenth Street Historic District.

The current building is located at Embassy Row. Additionally, Bolivia also has a Permanent Mission to the Organization of American States (OAS), located at 1929 19th Street NW, in the Adams Morgan neighborhood. The latter was built by John Nolan in 1908 for real estate developer Charles H. Davidson, with a design by Wood, Donn & Deming.

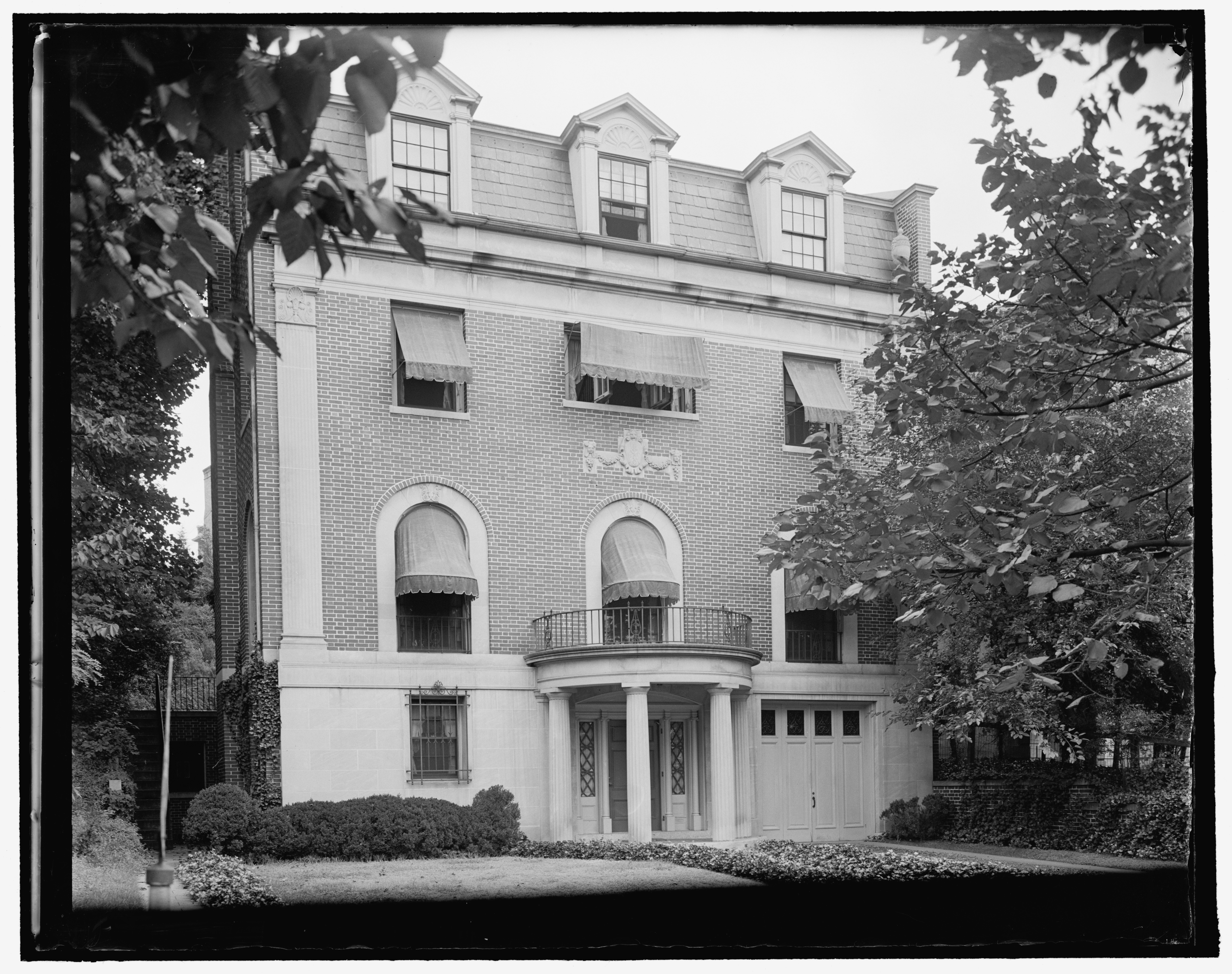
Legation at Massachusetts Avenue

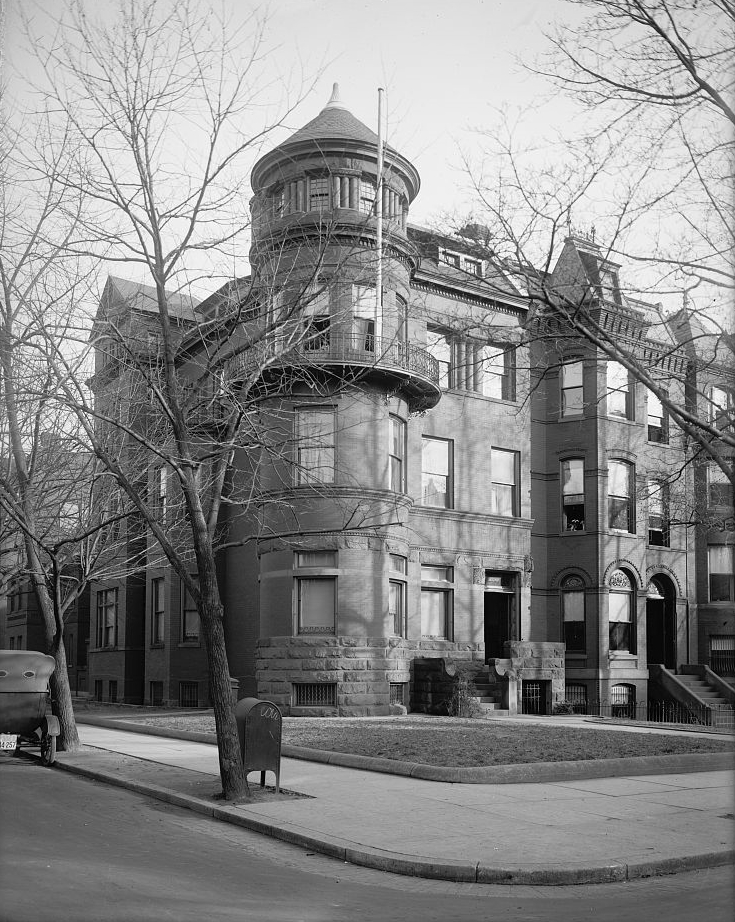
Former chancery at 16th Street

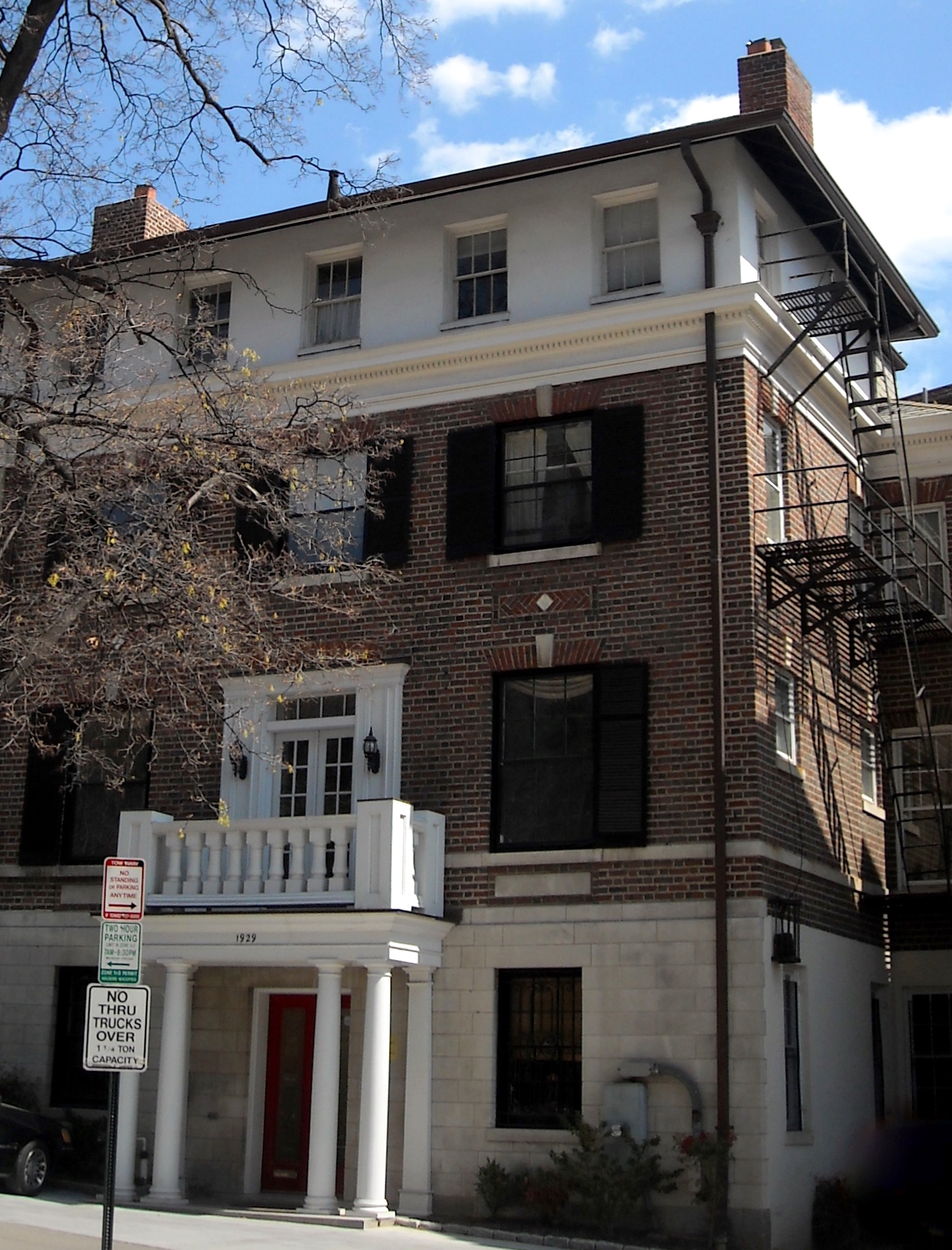
Bolivian mission to the OAS

== List of representatives ==
The Bolivian ambassador to the United States serves as Bolivia's foremost representative to the United States.

Name	Designated	Accredited	Term end	President	Notes
Juan Francisco Velarde Vaca	1889			Severo Fernández	
27 July 1897: Legation opened
Luís Paz Arce	July 27, 1897			Severo Fernández	
Fernando Eloy Guachalla	October 22, 1900			José Manuel Pando	
Jorge E. Zalles	May 1, 1904			José Manuel Pando	Chargé d'affaires (a.i.).
Ignacio Calderón	May 27, 1904			José Manuel Pando	
Alberto Gutiérrez	March 15, 1905			Ismael Montes	Chargé d'affaires (a.i.) (1863-1928).
Alberto Cortadellas	July 15, 1920			Bautista Saavedra	Chargé d'affaires (a.i.).
Adolfo Balllvian	July 14, 1921			Bautista Saavedra	
Ricardo Jaimes Freyre	October 8, 1923			Bautista Saavedra	
Eduardo Díez de Medina	February 10, 1928			Hernando Siles	
Luis Oruro Abelli	September 17, 1931			Daniel Salamanca	
Enrique Sanchez de Lozada	August 26, 1932			Daniel Salamanca	Chargé d'affaires (a.i.).
Enrique Finot	December 6, 1932			Daniel Salamanca	
Luis Fernando Guachalla	September 21, 1936	October 6, 1936		David Toro	
31 March 1942: Legation raised to embassy
Luis Fernando Guachalla	March 24, 1942	March 31, 1942	January 20, 1944	Enrique Peñaranda	
20 January – 23 June 1944: Relations severed
Carlos Dorado Chopitea	June 27, 1944			Gualberto Villarroel	Chargé d'affaires (a.i.).
Víctor Andrade Uzquiano	November 13, 1944	December 21, 1944	July 21, 1946	Gualberto Villarroel	
21 July – 12 August 1946: Relations severed
Raúl Diez de Medina	August 12, 1946	1946	1946	Néstor Guillén	Chargé d'affaires (a.i.).
Ricardo Martínez Vargas	September 5, 1946	September 13, 1946		Tomás Monje	
Víctor Andrade Uzquiano	July 29, 1952	August 11, 1952		Víctor Paz Estenssoro	
Manuel Barrau Peláez	October 9, 1958	October 31, 1958		Hernán Siles Zuazo	
Víctor Andrade Uzquiano	January 15, 1960	February 15, 1960		Hernán Siles Zuazo	
Emilio Sarmiento	November 19, 1962			Víctor Paz Estenssoro	Chargé d'affaires (a.i.).
Enrique Sanchez de Lozada	March 27, 1963	April 24, 1963		Víctor Paz Estenssoro	
Julio Sanjinés Goitia	April 22, 1965	May 5, 1965		René Barrientos	
Antonio Sanchez De Lozada	January 13, 1971	February 8, 1971	1971	Juan José Torres	
Edmundo Valencia Ibáñez	October 14, 1971	October 21, 1971		Hugo Banzer	
Juan José Loria	July 18, 1974			Hugo Banzer	Chargé d'affaires (a.i.).
Roberto Capriles Gutiérrez	January 17, 1975	January 29, 1975		Hugo Banzer	
Luis Arnal	January 31, 1976			Hugo Banzer	Chargé d'affaires (a.i.).
Alberto Crespo Gutierrez	March 31, 1976	May 21, 1976		Hugo Banzer	
Juan L. Cariaga	December 1, 1977			Hugo Banzer	Chargé d'affaires (a.i.).
Carlos Iturralde Ballivián	May 20, 1978	April 7, 1978		Hugo Banzer	
Roberto Arce Álvarez	February 20, 1979	March 30, 1979		David Padilla	
Julio Sanjinés Goitia	January 19, 1982	February 5, 1982		Celso Torrelio	
Luis Minaya	October 21, 1982			Hernán Siles Zuazo	
Mariano Baptista Gumucio	February 23, 1983	April 7, 1983		Hernán Siles Zuazo	
Fernando Illanes de la Riva	February 28, 1986	March 11, 1986		Víctor Paz Estenssoro	
Carlos Delius Evers	March 9, 1988	March 22, 1988		Víctor Paz Estenssoro	
Jorge Crespo-Velasco	November 17, 1989	December 20, 1989		Jaime Paz Zamora	
Andres Petricevic Raznatovic	November 15, 1993	December 9, 1993		Gonzalo Sánchez de Lozada	
Fernando Álvaro Cossio	November 13, 1995	February 6, 1996		Gonzalo Sánchez de Lozada	
Marcelo Pérez Monasterios	December 12, 1997	March 16, 1998		Hugo Banzer	
Marlene Fernández del Granado	February 3, 2000	June 14, 2000		Hugo Banzer	
Jaime Aparicio Otero	January 17, 2003	February 26, 2003		Gonzalo Sánchez de Lozada	
Mario Gustavo Guzmán Saldaña	September 8, 2006	September 12, 2006	2008	Evo Morales	
Erika Ángela Dueñas Loayza				Evo Morales	Chargé d'affaires (a.i.).
Freddy Bersatti Tudela	April 1, 2011			Evo Morales	Chargé d'affaires (a.i.).
Pablo Canedo Daroca	July 18, 2017		November 12, 2019	Evo Morales	Chargé d'affaires (a.i.).
Walter Óscar Serrate Cuellar	November 26, 2019			Jeanine Áñez	First ambassador since 2008.
Henry Baldelomar Chávez			Incumbent	Luis Arce	Chargé d'affaires (a.i.).

== See also ==
- Bolivia–United States relations
- List of ambassadors of the United States to Bolivia
