= Douglas Henderson (ambassador) =

United States Ambassador to Bolivia

Douglas Henderson (October 15, 1914 – July 14, 2010) was an American diplomat and government official. He was United States Ambassador to Bolivia during the 1964 Bolivian coup d'état and Che Guevara's ill-fated 1966-1967 insurgency.

== Early life and education ==
Douglas Henderson was born in Newton, Massachusetts on October 15, 1914. He was one of seven children and grew up in the nearby town of Weston, Massachusetts in a home built by his father, a professional carpenter. Henderson's family was struck hard by the Great Depression and following his graduation at age 16 from Weston High School in 1931 he worked various odd-jobs to support his family before he was able to obtain a scholarship to attend Boston University, graduating Phi Beta Kappa in 1940 with a bachelor's degree in economics.

The following year he went on to receive a master's degree in law and diplomacy from the Fletcher School at Tufts College in Medford, Massachusetts and participated in the Ph.D program there while also employed as an instructor of history. Following America's entry into World War II he left the university to pursue a diplomatic career, joining the United States Foreign Service in 1942. That same year he married Dorothy Frances Henderson, a dietician from Winthrop, Massachusetts.

== Early diplomatic career ==
Henderson's initial assignments with the US State Department saw him appointed to various consular posts in Latin America: Nogales, Mexico (1942–1943) Arica, Chile (1943) and Cochabamba, Bolivia (1943–1947). Henderson was next posted to the Department of Commerce in Washington, DC where he worked as a financial analyst for the American Republics Branch of the Office of International Economics (1947–1950). It was while serving in this position that he authored a significant section of President Harry S. Truman's 1949 inaugural address which laid the groundwork for the creation of the State Department's so-called Point Four Program, which was designed to increase the sharing of American scientific and industrial expertise with underdeveloped countries.

Following his service at the Commerce Department, Henderson was appointed First Secretary of the US Embassy in Bern, Switzerland (1950–1956). He returned to the United States after being named assistant director of the State Department's Economic Defense Administration (1956–1959). After completing the Foreign Service Institute's Senior Officers’ Training Course, Henderson was next assigned to the American embassy in Lima, Peru first as the Chief Economics Officer (1960–1962) and later promoted to the position of Chargé d'affaires (1962–1963). When the Peruvian military deposed the pro-American government of President Manuel Prado in a July 1962 coup, the administration of President John F. Kennedy responded by withdrawing its ambassador, leaving Henderson as the de facto chief of the US embassy in Lima.

His compotent service in the tumultuous months following the coup, during which US-Peruvian relations were severely strained, brought Henderson to the attention of his superiors in Washington. On November 8, 1963, Henderson was appointed to serve as United States Ambassador to Bolivia by President John F. Kennedy. His appointment was reconfirmed by President Lyndon B. Johnson following Kennedy's assassination later that same month, making him the first American graduate of the Fletcher School to achieve the rank of ambassador.

== U.S. Ambassador to Bolivia ==
When Henderson assumed his new post in the Bolivian capital of La Paz in December 1963 the nation was in a state of tremendous turmoil. The government of President Víctor Paz Estenssoro was moribund and subject to deep internal divisions. More alarming from the American perspective were the frequent clashes between government forces and militant tin miners protesting the government's plans to overhaul the mining industry. In the climate of the Cold War the weakness of the Paz government and the growing radicalism of Bolivia's miners aroused fears among many US policymakers that the nation was vulnerable to subversion by pro-communist elements, specifically those aligned with Cuban leader Fidel Castro.

In an effort to address these concerns Henderson sought to cultivate a close personal relationship with President Paz Estenssoro and to persuade him to confront Bolivia's problems more forcefully. He succeeded in the former case but the Paz government's internal weaknesses continually frustrated his larger goals. Matters changed drastically on November 4, 1964, when Paz Estenssoro was deposed in a military coup that installed General René Barrientos, the charismatic former commander of the Bolivian Air Force, as president.

Henderson, despite his serious misgivings about the ability of the Paz administration to govern Bolivia effectively, opposed the coup. This opposition also put him at odds with many in the Pentagon and Central Intelligence Agency (CIA), where Barrientos’ reputation as a staunch anti-communist and positive disposition toward American interests made him extremely popular. Henderson's disquiet notwithstanding, the new regime did implement many of the policies he had advocated but had been ignored by the previous government. Barrientos employed the army to swiftly pacify the rebellion amongst the tin miners and welcomed American efforts to modernize Bolivia's outmoded military.

What had previously been a relatively modest program of American aid to the Bolivian armed forces became a veritable flood under Barrientos. As the relationship between Bolivia and the U.S. grew closer, Henderson began to acquire a great deal of influence in La Paz, even becoming a regular attendee of President Barrientos' cabinet meetings. He also astutely pressured the regime to use some of the U.S. aid it was receiving to serve political ends, convincing Barrientos to employ civil action programs such as the building roads, bridges and schools as a means of improving the regime's image with the Bolivian public.

=== Che Guevara's Bolivian Campaign ===
The greatest challenge faced by Henderson during his time as United States Ambassador to Bolivia was the incipient guerrilla war organized by Cuban-supported insurgents under the leadership of the iconic Marxist revolutionary Ernesto "Che" Guevara. When fighting began in the nation's mountainous southeast during the early-spring of 1967, the guerrillas managed to stage numerous successful attacks against the Bolivian Army. However, their movement failed to gain traction politically among the membership of the Bolivian Communist Party in the urban areas of the country, while the expected popular support for the guerrillas among the campesinos, Bolivia's rural peasant farmers, also failed to materialize.

Nevertheless, the revelation of Guevara's presence in Bolivia caused panic within the nation's government and military. This was reflected in claims made to Henderson by President Barrientos that the guerrilla force comprised between 100 and 200 men, four times its actual size. Henderson was rightfully dubious and assessed that the Bolivians were exaggerating the strength of the guerrillas in an opportunistic effort to secure greater military aid from the U.S. The military priorities of the Bolivians clashed with those of Henderson who sought to limit direct American involvement in the guerrilla episode as much possible. Henderson counseled Barrientos to accept a more modest aid package, one which included a detachment of American Green Berets who would train a unit of Bolivian Army Rangers in counter-insurgency warfare.

Unbeknownst to Henderson, his successful efforts to curb US involvement undercut one of the major political goals of Guevara's overall plan, which was to provoke a substantial American military response to his presence in Bolivia that would enable the guerrillas to cast their struggle as resistance to US imperialism. Henderson also endeavored to soften the Barrientos regime's hard-line image following the capture in April 1967 of Régis Debray, a prominent French Marxist intellectual who had been arrested by Bolivian authorities after he was found to have been in contact with the guerrillas. The Bolivians initial intent was to summarily execute Debray as an enemy combatant, however Henderson (in response to an outpouring of international appeals on behalf of Debray, some of it from French president Charles de Gaulle and Nobel laureate Jean-Paul Sartre) used his influence to convince Barrientos to spare the Frenchman's life and instead have him stand trial. This incident proved hugely unpopular with the Bolivian military, an attitude that was compounded during Debray's subsequent trial in which he regularly used the court proceedings to publicly promote his Marxist beliefs.

These incidents likely played a major role in the events following Guevara's capture in October, 1967 by US-trained Bolivian counter-insurgency troops. Anxious to avoid a repeat of the Debray affair, Barrientos ordered Guevara's execution within 24 hours after he was taken into custody and did not fully inform Henderson of the details surrounding the incident, withholding official confirmation of Guevara's death until a week after the guerrilla leader had been executed by the army in the village of La Higuera. Henderson had in fact been previously directed by US National Security Advisor Walt Rostow to secure Guevara alive if possible, so that he might be brought to the US Panama Canal Zone and interrogated by the CIA.

== Later diplomatic career and retirement ==
When his wife Dorothy Frances became seriously ill during the aftermath of the guerrilla episode Henderson resigned as United States Ambassador to Bolivia in August 1968 and returned to the United States settling with his family in Washington, D.C. where his wife would die later that year. He continued his work for the State Department where his service in Bolivia had served to undercut Henderson's diplomatic career. This was in large part due to his unpopularity with the Pentagon and CIA stemming from his early opposition to the 1964 coup by Barrientos and his sometimes rocky relationships with US military officials who resented his efforts to rein in the influence and involvement of American forces during the Guevara insurgency.

Also harmful to Henderson's career was a British documentary film that had been made in Bolivia during the height of the insurgency in which Henderson had appeared and given an interview. The film depicted Henderson himself in an unflattering light and in addition was also highly critical of both the United States and the Barrientos regime. The film and Henderson's involvement in it proved a major embarrassment for both him and the State Department.

Henderson would go on to hold several mid-level bureaucratic posts in the State Department's Bureau of Inter-American Affairs before being appointed to a sub-ambassadorial post as the Deputy US Representative to the Organization of American States in charge of social and economic issues. It was during this time that he met his second wife Marion, whom he married in 1970. He retired from the State Department in 1975 and returned to his hometown of Weston, Massachusetts.

Following his retirement, Henderson continued to be active in public service, volunteering to serve on Weston's Sewer Committee. This body would establish "in-place cycling" of the town's sewage, a practice that was later adopted as federal policy by the Environmental Protection Agency (EPA). He was also involved with Land's Sake, Inc., a nonprofit group that he co-founded in 1980 to promote the benefits of small-scale land use in farming and educational programming.

He died at his home in Weston on July 14, 2010, at the age of 95 following a battle with prostate cancer.

Diplomatic posts
| Preceded by Ben S. Stephansky | United States Ambassador to Bolivia; December 1963–August 1968 | Succeeded by Raúl Héctor Castro |
