= Manuel Rocha =

American diplomat and Cuban spy (born 1950)

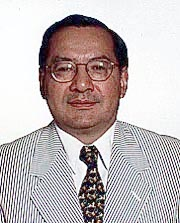

United States Ambassador to Bolivia
- In office August 4, 2000 – April 27, 2002
- President: Bill Clinton; George W. Bush
- Preceded by: Donna J. Hrinak
- Succeeded by: David N. Greenlee

United States Chargé d’affaires to Argentina
- In office October 1997 – July 3, 2000
- President: Bill Clinton
- Preceded by: Ronald D. Godard
- Succeeded by: James Donald Walsh

Personal details
- Born: Víctor Manuel Rocha; October 23, 1950 (age 75) Bogotá, Colombia
- Citizenship: Colombia; United States (since 1978); Dominican Republic (since 2014)
- Education: Yale University (BA); Harvard University (MPA); Georgetown University (MS)

Victor Manuel Rocha (born October 23, 1950) is a former American diplomat and United States Ambassador to Bolivia. Rocha was arrested by federal officials in December 2023 and admitted to acting as an illegal agent of Cuba for 40 years. He was sentenced to 15 years in federal prison.

== Background ==
Rocha was born on October 23, 1950, in Bogotá, Colombia, and grew up in the Morningside Heights housing projects in Harlem, New York City. He graduated from the Taft School in 1969, where he was captain of the soccer team, and he graduated from Yale University cum laude in 1973. He received a master's degree in public administration (MPA) from Harvard University in 1976 and a Master of Science in Foreign Service (MSc) from Georgetown University in 1978. He became a naturalized citizen of the United States in 1978.

In November 1981, Rocha began working for the U.S. Department of State, serving as a Political Officer in the Embassy of the United States, Santo Domingo, Dominican Republic, from December 1982 to January 1985. From February 1987 to February 1989, he worked as a Political-Military Affairs Officer in the U.S. Embassy in Tegucigalpa, Honduras. Rocha next served as First Secretary of the U.S. Embassy in Mexico City, Mexico from February 1989 to November 1991.

From November 1991 to July 1994, Rocha served as Deputy Chief of the U.S. Embassy in Santo Domingo, Dominican Republic. From July 1994 to July 1995, he worked as the Director of Inter-American Affairs on the U.S. National Security Council, influencing diplomacy with the Cuban government. Between 1995 and July 1997, Rocha operated as the Deputy Principal Officer of the U.S. Interests Section of the Embassy of Switzerland in Havana, Cuba, which was the de facto U.S. embassy in Havana until the 2015 Cuban thaw that normalized diplomatic relations between the United States and Cuba. Between July 1997 and November 1999, Rocha served as Deputy Chief of the U.S. Embassy in Buenos Aires, Argentina. He also served in Italy.

== Ambassadorship to Bolivia ==
President Bill Clinton appointed Rocha as U.S. Ambassador to Bolivia on June 14, 2000, and he was sworn in on July 14, 2000. He presented his credentials to the President of Bolivia on August 4, 2000, and served as ambassador until August 7, 2002. At the time of his appointment as ambassador, the State Department said that he and his wife, Karla Wittkop Rocha, had two children.

Rocha's off-the-cuff remark weeks before the 2002 Bolivian general election threatening to cut American aid to Bolivia over Evo Morales's support for the coca-growers movement has been credited with boosting Morales's Movement for Socialism party in the 2002 Bolivian general election — after that, Morales called Rocha his best "campaign manager".

== Career after leaving the foreign service ==
Rocha was a member of the Council on Foreign Relations in New York. He was also on the University of Miami's International Advisory Board. At one time, Rocha was also a member of Henry Kissinger's International Council on Terrorism and was on the advisory board of the Cuba Transition Project of the University of Miami. He served as a special advisor to the U.S. military commander of SOUTHCOM. He was Director of Government Relations for Arcos Dorados Holdings, the company that owns and manages most of the McDonald's restaurants in Latin America. He was a senior advisor on International Business for American law firm Foley & Lardner LLP, with his office in Miami, and president of Barrick Gold Corp. Pueblo Viejo, in the Dominican Republic.

The communications and marketing firm LLYC hired Rocha as a Senior International Business Advisor in September 2023. Upon learning of the U.S. government's criminal charges against Rocha for acting as an illegal foreign agent for Cuba, his employment was terminated.

== Foreign agent ==
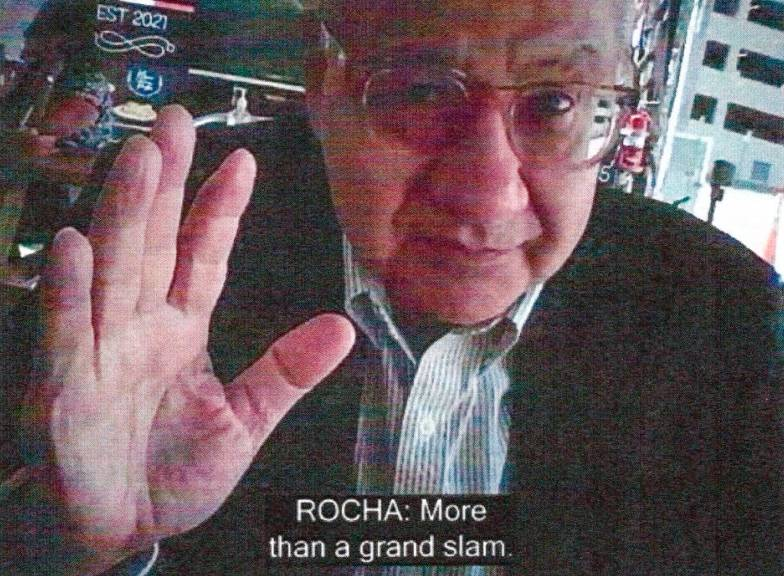
Rocha in a meeting with an undercover FBI agent (2023)

On December 1, 2023, Rocha was arrested in Miami, Florida, where he was living, and charged with acting as an illegal agent of the Cuban government.

According to the criminal complaint filed against Rocha in the U.S. District Court for Southern Florida, he has admitted to gathering intelligence for Cuba since 1981, despite the federal government's classification of the Cuban government as a sponsor of international terrorism. In a video recorded by an undercover agent, Rocha praised Fidel Castro, called the United States the "enemy", and boasted about spying for over 40 years.

Rocha allegedly described traveling in 2017 to meet his handlers in Havana by first flying to the Dominican Republic under his U.S. passport, then using his Dominican Republic passport to travel to Panama City, where he boarded his final flight to Cuba. On other occasions, Rocha flew directly to Cuba using his U.S. passport. Rocha reportedly became a citizen of the Dominican Republic through marriage in 2014.

According to the criminal complaint, Rocha said that he was instructed by Cuba to "lead a normal life", and created a fictitious persona of a "right-wing person". Rocha's $750 campaign donation to Republican Congresswoman María Elvira Salazar was returned after his arrest.

In April 2024, Rocha pleaded guilty to conspiring to act as an agent of a foreign government. He was subsequently sentenced to 15 years in prison and ordered to pay a $500,000 fine.

== See also ==
- Ana Montes
- Kendall Myers

== Links ==
- Federal Bureau of Prisons Inmate Locator for Inmate 12347-506

Diplomatic posts
Preceded by Ronald D. Godard	United States Chargé d’affaires in Argentina; 1997–2000	Succeeded by James Donald Walsh
Preceded by Donna J. Hrinak	United States Ambassador to Bolivia; 2000–2002	Succeeded by David N. Greenlee
