= Bolivia–United States relations =

- Bolivia: United States

Diplomatic mission
- Bolivian Embassy, Washington D.C.: United States Embassy, La Paz

Envoy
- General Henry Baldelomar Chávez: Charge d'Affaires Debra Heiva

Bolivia–United States relations were established in 1837 with the first ambassadorial visit from the United States to Peru–Bolivian Confederation. The Confederation dissolved in 1839, and bilateral relations did not occur until 1848 when the United States recognized Bolivia as a sovereign state and appointed John Appleton as the Chargé d'Affaires.

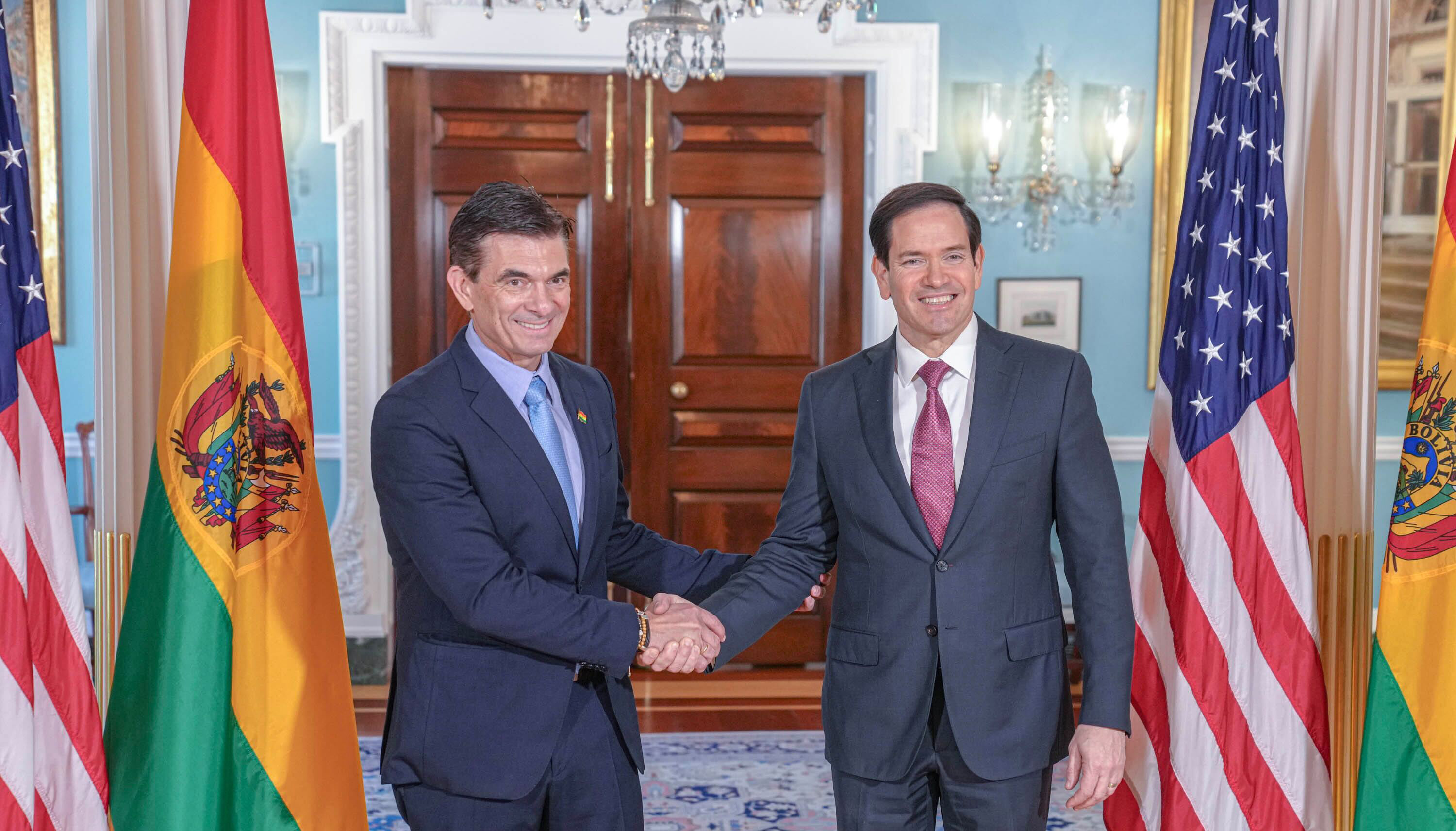
Bolivian president-elect Rodrigo Paz with U.S. Secretary of State Marco Rubio in October 2025

While opposed to other self-identified "revolutionary" governments, the United States engaged with the National Revolutionary Movement (MNR) following the country's 1952 Revolution in an effort to encourage to move its politics to the right. In 1971, the US government viewed President Juan Jose Torres as anti-American and funded military officers plotting to overthrow him. General Hugo Banzer took power later that year and had cooperative relations with the United States. However, under the Jimmy Carter administration, the United States supported a transition to democracy and opposed the 1979 and 1980 coups by Generals Alberto Natusch Busch and Luis García Meza, respectively. The United States supported the 1985 shift to neoliberal economic policies under the government of Víctor Paz Estenssoro, who had also led Bolivia after the 1952 Revolution.

From the 1980s onwards, the US became heavily concerned with stopping the growing and trafficking of coca leaves, a precursor to cocaine, in Bolivia. The US supplied training and equipment for an eradication campaign focused on the Chapare coca region. However, in 2005, coca grower leader Evo Morales was elected to the presidency as the leader of the Movement Towards Socialism. Morales was publicly critical of US policies and brought Bolivia closer to Venezuela, Cuba, Russia, and China. Morales severed diplomatic relations following the 2008 political crisis, and expelled the US Drug Enforcement Administration and USAID. Subsequent negotiations between the two governments were unsuccessful at restoring them. Following Morales' resignation in November 2019, under pressure from protests and the Bolivian military, the United States renewed USAID assistance. Following the 2025 Bolivian general election, relations between the two countries were reestablished.

According to the 2012 U.S. Global Leadership Report, 34% of Bolivians approve "the job performance of the leadership of the U.S.", with 26% disapproving and 40% uncertain. In a 2013 global opinion poll, 55% of Bolivians view the U.S. favorably, with 29% expressing an unfavorable view.

== History ==
=== Modern relations ===
The election of Evo Morales as president later in 2006 caused fresh tensions. The Morales platform includes programs to return land and power to the Aymara people of Bolivia, to nationalize key industries and to legalize use of coca, a traditional Aymara medicine. In September 2008, US president George W. Bush placed Bolivia on a counter-narcotics blacklist along with Venezuela. He said that Bolivia had "failed demonstrably" to meet commitments to combat the production and trafficking of illicit drugs, mainly cocaine. Speaking a week later, Evo Morales said the United States has tried to thwart his policies and had failed to condemn a pro-autonomy movement that uses terrorist tactics. He said that as a member of parliament in 2002, he was accused by the U.S. ambassador of being a narcotics trafficker and an assassin, and that later the ambassador had called him an Andean bin Laden and threatened to cut off aid if Bolivians voted for him. Morales accused the CIA of assisting the previous regime in Bolivia, and said that the U.S. military had supported illegal arms shipments to rebels.

In November 2010, Morales accused the U.S. of aiding coup attempts in Venezuela, Bolivia and Ecuador, as well as successful coup in Honduras, while also denouncing the U.S. attempts to define whom Bolivia should have foreign relations with, alluding to disagreements over possible talks between Iran and Bolivia.

In September 2018 at a United Nations Security Council meeting, Morales accused the U.S. of promoting torture. Morales also criticized US president Donald Trump face-to-face for threatening Venezuela and for its opposition to the International Criminal Court.

=== Morales plane incident ===
Relations between the United States and Bolivia deteriorated further in July 2013, when Bolivian President Evo Morales's plane, while returning to Bolivia from Russia, landed in Vienna, Austria after France, Spain, Portugal and Italy informed Bolivia that their airspace was closed to his plane due to unsubstantiated rumors that U.S. whistleblower Edward Snowden was on-board his aircraft. Morales said the United States pressured European countries to prevent his passage home. After arriving back in La Paz, Morales said he would potentially close the US Embassy in La Paz, stating "We do not need the embassy of the United States."

=== Áñez interim government and return of MAS under Luis Arce ===
In November 2019, after accusations of fraud in the general election and the ensuing political crisis, Evo Morales resigned as president and Senator Jeanine Áñez took power. After Morales ouster, Áñez steadily improved relations with the United States, which had been at a low point under Morales's administration and named a temporary ambassador to the United States for the first time in more than a decade.

After the general election of October 2020 and the victory of socialist candidate Luis Arce, relations worsened despite an attempt by Arce to improve ties with the United States. When Jeanine Áñez and several of her cabinet ministers were arrested in March 2021 and charged with criminal offences related to massacres that took place during the first days of her presidency, relations hit a new low, after remarks by U.S. Secretary of State Antony Blinken and called for Áñez's release. In response, the Arce administration stated the United States was interfering in Bolivia's internal affairs.

=== Rapprochement ===
In October 2025, Bolivia president-elect Rodrigo Paz Pereira stated that he seeks to restore Bolivia's relations with the United States. Christopher Landau, the U.S. Deputy Secretary of State, attended Paz's inauguration in November 2025, and he announced that both countries will reestablish relations at ambassador level

The government of Paz announced in December 2025 that American nationals could travel to Bolivia without visa. In February 2026, Bolivia revived anti-drug alliance with the United States Drug Enforcement Administration (DEA) after nearly 18-year break, meaning DEA was again present in Bolivia. In March 2026, President Rodrigo Paz met president Donald Trump at the "Shield of the Americas" summit in Miami, USA.

== US aid to Bolivia ==
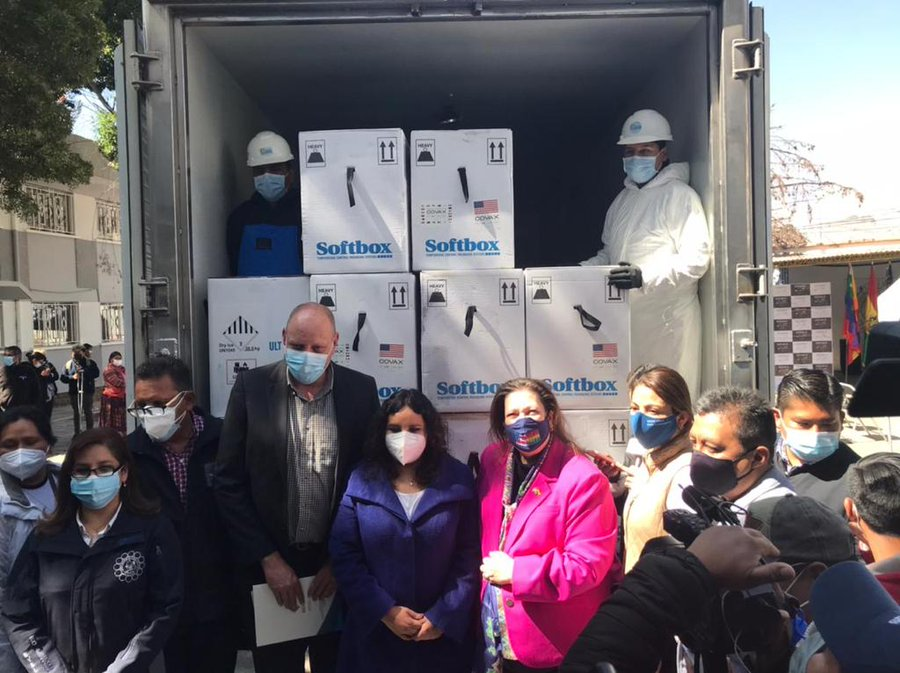
The US delivers Coronavirus vaccines to Bolivia through the COVAX program in 2021

The US State Department notes that the United States Government channels its development assistance to Bolivia through USAID. USAID is well known in Bolivia, especially in rural areas where thousands of projects have been implemented. USAID has been providing assistance to Bolivia since the 1960s and works with the Government of Bolivia, the private sector, and the Bolivian people to achieve equitable and sustainable development. USAID/Bolivia provides about $85 million annually in development assistance through bilateral agreements with the Bolivian Government and unilateral agreements with other organizations. USAID programs are implemented by non-governmental organizations (NGOs), the private sector, and the Bolivian Government. USAID's programs support Bolivia's National Development Plan and are designed to address key issues, such as poverty and the social exclusion of historically disadvantaged populations, focusing efforts on Bolivia's peri-urban and rural populations. USAID's programs in Bolivia strengthen democratic institutions; provide economic opportunities for disadvantaged populations through business development and trade; improve family health; promote sustainable use of natural resources and biodiversity conservation; provide farmers alternatives to illicit coca cultivation; and improve food security.

In August 2007, Bolivian Vice President Alvaro Garcia Linera said that the U.S. Embassy was using aid programs to fund the government's political opponents, trying to develop "ideological and political resistance." He cited USAID financing of Juan Carlos Urenda, author of a plan for Santa Cruz's secession from Bolivia. A State Department spokesman denied the accusation, and USAID officials said they provided support to all Bolivian governors, not just those in the opposition. In a decree issued by Bolivia's supreme court in October 2007, one article states that Bolivia will not accept money with political or ideological strings attached. Evo Morales declared "The imperialist project is to try to carve up Bolivia, and with that to carve up South America because it is the epicenter of great changes that are advancing on a world scale." On May 1, 2013, the Bolivian president Evo Morales expelled the USAID Program for allegedly attempting to undermine the government by supporting the opposition.

In January 2020, U.S. President Donald Trump determined to waive a restriction on United States assistance to Bolivia, following the resignation of Evo Morales and his government in November 2019.

== Bolivian criticism of U.S. government policy ==
The US State Department observes that Bolivian government hostility and provocations towards the United States strained bilateral relations in 2008, as the Bolivian government escalated verbal attacks against the U.S. Government and began to dismantle vital elements of the relationship. In June, the government endorsed the expulsion of USAID from Bolivia's largest coca growing region. In September, President Morales expelled Ambassador Philip S. Goldberg from Bolivia, declaring him "persona non grata." In November President Morales expelled the Drug Enforcement Administration (DEA) from the country on the grounds that "personnel from the DEA supported activities of the unsuccessful coup d'etat in Bolivia" ending a 35-year history of DEA activity in Bolivia. Morales said of Philip Goldberg that "he is conspiring against democracy and seeking the division of Bolivia."

Gustavo Guzman, the Bolivian ambassador to Washington, was expelled in retaliation. Guzman said "The U.S. embassy is historically used to calling the shots in Bolivia, violating our sovereignty, treating us like a banana republic." He claimed that the US was openly supporting autonomy-seeking Santa Cruz politicians including the mayor Percy Fernandez and the prefect Rubén Costas. Ambassador Goldberg met Costas in August 2008. Immediately after the visit, Costas assumed power, declared that Santa Cruz was autonomous and ordered the take-over of national government offices. The visit to Santa Cruz was the trigger for Goldberg's expulsion.

In the midst of the 2019 Venezuelan presidential crisis, Morales accused the United States government of xenophobia due to it not recognizing Nicolás Maduro as the legitimate President of Venezuela.

== Narcotics issues ==
After decades of rule under a military dictatorship, with only glimmers of moments when civilians governed, democratic rule was reestablished with the election of Hernan Suazo in 1982. Following Suazo's election, layoffs within the tin mining industry led to migration to Bolivia's Chapare region, where migrants relied upon coca farming for subsistence and organized its trade. The Six Coca Growers’ Federations, a unit composed of agrarian unions, governed and maintained the region in the absence of a state presence. As the Chapare region was being settled, the US reinstituted the aid that had been cut during the military coup of 1980. Included in the aid was funding for drug control as well as $4 million for the creation and maintenance of UMOPAR, a rural drug police unit.

Coca is a sacred medicine to the Aymara people of the Andes, who use coca tea as a stimulant to provide energy at high altitudes, to relieve headaches and to alleviate menstrual pain. This causes tension with the US, which is trying to solve their internal problems with cocaine abuse (cocaine is a highly concentrated form of an active ingredient of coca.) In June 2002, the United States ambassador Manuel Rocha condemned Evo Morales in a speech, warning Bolivian voters that if they elected someone who wanted Bolivia to become a major cocaine exporter again, the future of U.S. aid would be endangered. The speech was widely credited with generating a huge boost of more than ten points for Morales in the ensuing elections, who came within two points of winning the national presidential vote. Morales called Rocha his "campaign chief."

The US State Department points out that control of illegal narcotics is a major issue in the bilateral relationship. For centuries, Bolivian coca leaf has been chewed and used in traditional rituals, but in the 1970s and 1980s the emergence of the drug trade led to a rapid expansion of coca cultivation used to make cocaine, particularly in the tropical Chapare region in the Department of Cochabamba (not a traditional coca growing area). in 1986, the US used its own troops in Operation Blast Furnace, “the first major antidrug operation on foreign soil to publicly involve US military forces”). US officials claimed that such military action was needed to close cocaine laboratories, block cocaine trade routes, and seize cargo planes suspected of transporting cocaine. US presence in the country sparked protest against its violation of Bolivia's sovereignty. In 1988, a new law, Law 1008, recognized only 12,000 hectares in the Yungas as sufficient to meet the licit demand of coca. Law 1008 also explicitly stated that coca grown in the Chapare was not required to meet traditional demand for chewing or for tea, and the law called for the eradication, over time, of all "excess" coca.

To accomplish that goal, successive Bolivian governments instituted programs offering cash compensation to coca farmers who eradicated voluntarily, and the government began developing and promoting suitable alternative crops for peasants to grow. Beginning in 1997, the government launched a more effective policy of physically uprooting the illegal coca plants, and Bolivia's illegal coca production fell over the next 4 years by up to 90%. This plan, referred to as Plan Dignidad, was launched by President Hugo Banzer. Based on the concept of "shared responsibility with the international community, Plan Dignidad’s “four pillars of action” included “alternative development, prevention and rehabilitation, eradication, and interdiction”. Alternative development would have provided new opportunities for coca farmers so that they wouldn't depend on income made from coca crops and could stop cultivating it altogether.

This "forced" eradication remains controversial, however, and well-organized coca growers unions have blocked roads, harassed police eradicators, and occasionally used violence to protest the policy. In response, previous government security forces have used force. In 1998, the Joint Task Force (JTF), a combined unit of police and military, stationed members in the Chapare region. In 2001, the paramilitary Expeditionary Task Force (ETF) was created with funding from the US embassy. Although ETF troops were civilians, the commanding officers were Bolivian military officials. The use of security forces and the failure of government to negotiate and/or keep agreements with coca growers resulted in human rights abuses. Instead of being tried in civilian court under Bolivian constitutional law, human rights abuse cases were tried in military tribunals if they were tried at all. In some cases confrontations between security forces and coca growers or distributors have resulted in injuries and fatalities, raising human rights concerns. The Morales government has embarked on a policy of voluntary eradication and social control. Although violent confrontations between police and coca growers/distributors have decreased under the new approach, its long-term efficacy remains to be proven.

Bolivia plans to expand, at least for a limited time, legal coca production to 20,000 hectares and stresses development of legal commercial uses for coca leaf. Although the U.S. prefers long-term limits that track more closely with current estimated legal domestic demand of around 4,000 to 6,000 hectares, it will continues to support counter-narcotics efforts in Bolivia as the 20,000 hectare proposal is still significantly below current cultivation, which has oscillated between about 23,000 and 28,000 hectares since 2001.

The United States also heavily supports parallel efforts to interdict the smuggling of coca leaves, cocaine, and precursor chemicals. The U.S. Government has, in large measure, financed alternative development programs and the counter-narcotics police effort. The U.S. recertified Bolivia as not having "failed demonstrably" in 2007 to cooperate on counter-narcotics issues, finding Bolivia's interdiction efforts strongly positive, though against a backdrop of steadily rising production and trafficking of cocaine. Recent Bolivian governments have supported U.S. Government counter-narcotics programs.

The amount of Bolivian cocaine reaching the U.S. market is negligible. The New York Times speculates that U.S. aid for coca eradication may be designed more to give U.S. officials a rare window into Mr. Morales's government. However, even the limited cooperation between the two governments is under growing stress. Radical members of the Morales government have demanded expulsion of American aid workers. In June 2008, 20,000 protesters marched to the American Embassy in La Paz, clashing with the police and threatening to burn the building down. Evo Morales later praised the demonstrators.

In December 2024, Bolivia extradited its former anti-drugs director Maximiliano Dávila to the United States to face drug trafficking charges. He led the Bolivian Special Forces for the Fight Against Drug Trafficking (FELCN) during the presidency of Evo Morales.

== U.S. services to U.S. citizens in Bolivia ==
The US State Department notes that in addition to working closely with Bolivian Government officials to strengthen bilateral relations, the U.S. Embassy provides a wide range of services to U.S. citizens and businesses. Political and economic officers deal directly with the Bolivian Government in advancing U.S. interests, but are also available to provide information to American citizens on local economic and political conditions in the country. Commercial officers work closely with numerous U.S. companies that operate direct subsidiaries or have investments in Bolivia, providing information on Bolivian trade and industry regulations and administering several programs intended to aid U.S. companies starting or maintaining businesses in Bolivia.

The Consular Section of the Embassy and a consular agency in Santa Cruz, provide vital services to the estimated 13,000 American citizens resident in Bolivia. Some 40,000 U.S. citizens visit annually.

The Cochabamba Consulate was closed on December 19, 2014. Emergency Services will be handled from the La Paz Embassy.

== Principal U.S. embassy officials ==
- Chargé d'Affaires Debra Heiva
- Deputy Chief of Mission Joe Tordella

== Diplomatic missions ==
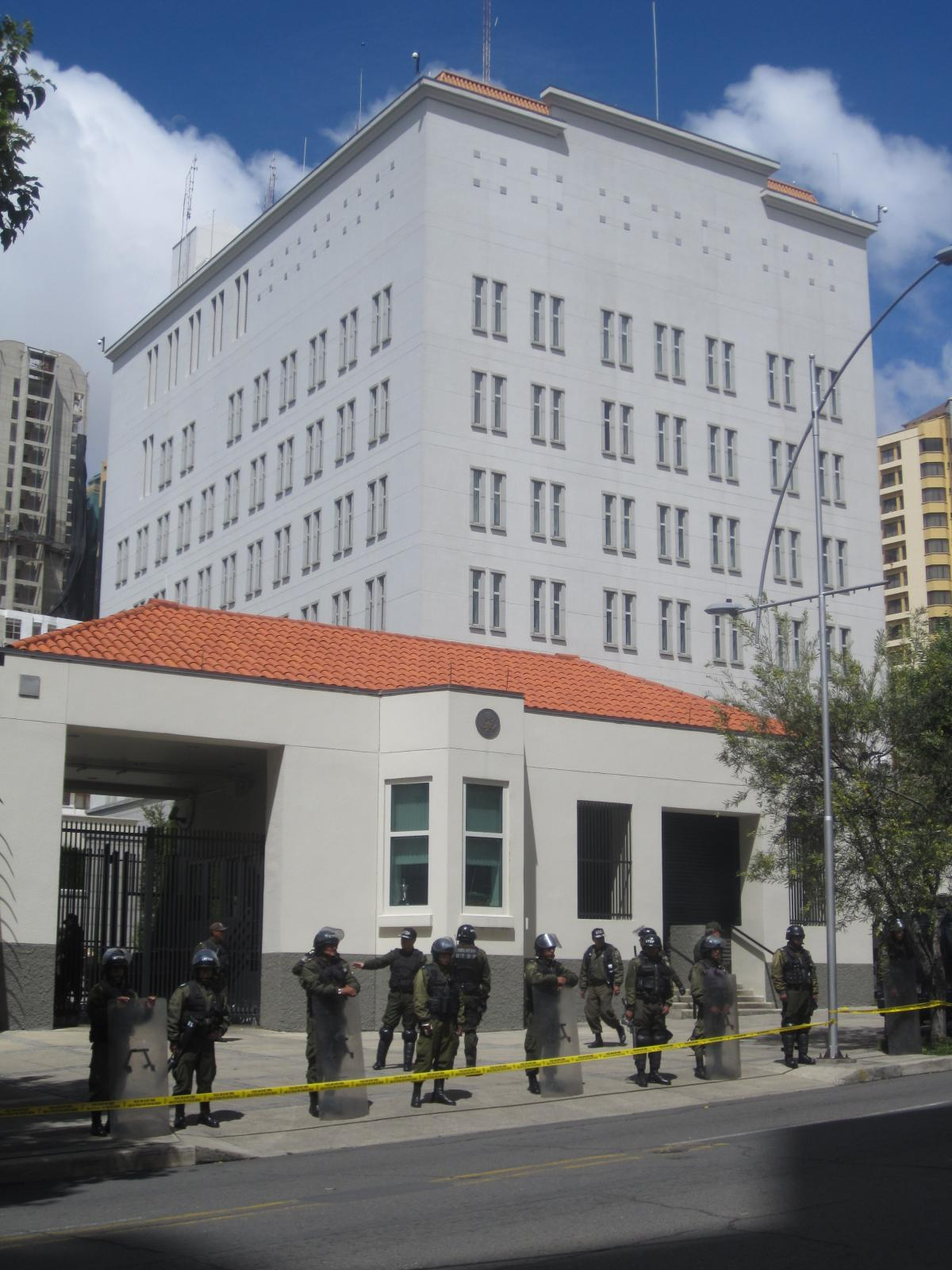
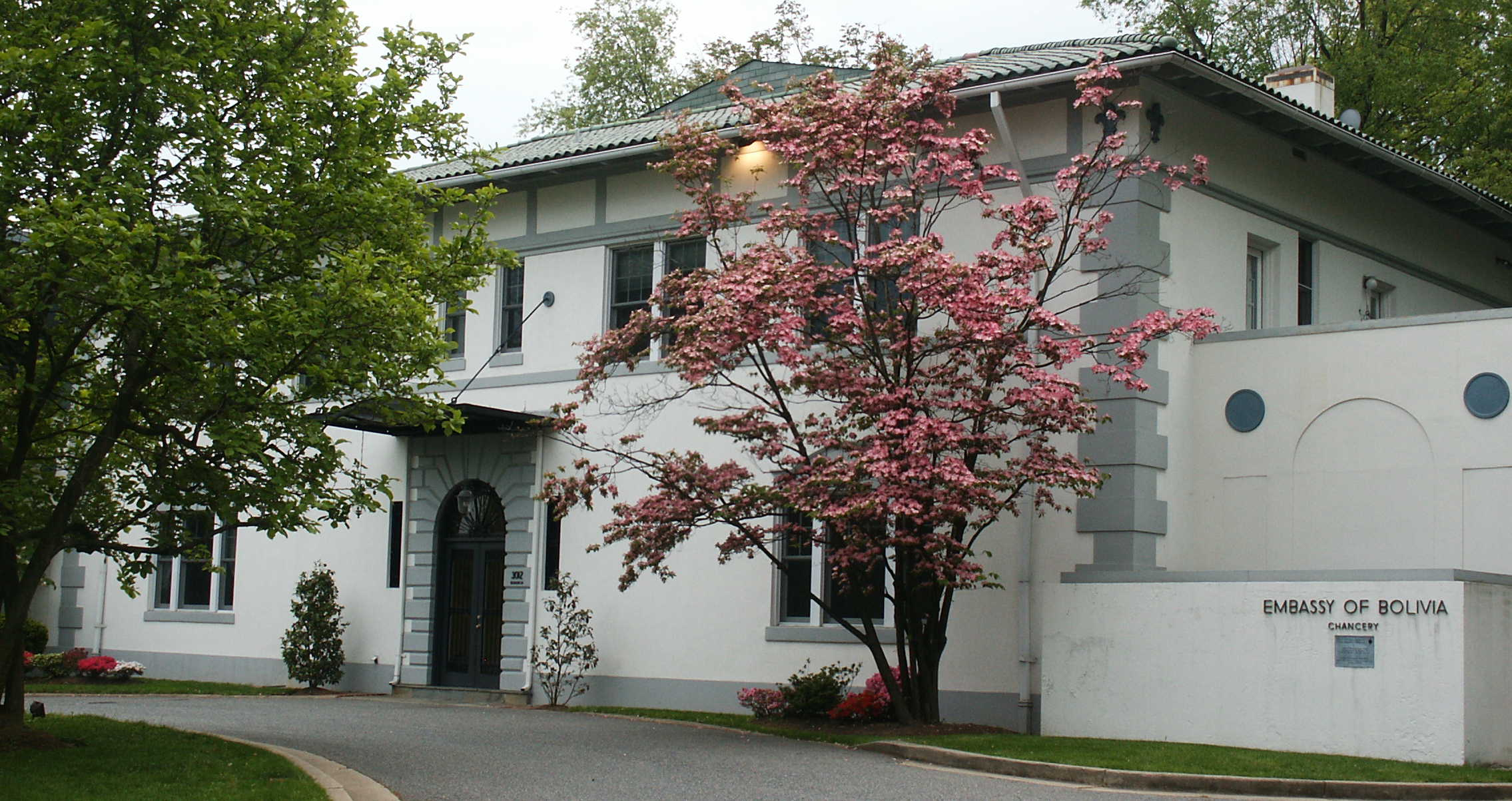
US Embassy in La Paz (left); Bolivian Embassy in Washington, D.C. (right)

The Embassy of Bolivia in Washington, D.C. is located at 3014 Massachusetts Avenue, Northwest, Washington, D.C., in the Embassy Row neighborhood.

The embassy also operates Consulates-General at 4420 Connecticut Avenue N.W., Suite #2 Washington, D.C., in Miami, Los Angeles, New York City and Houston. The Chargés d’affaires (acting ambassador) is Freddy Bersatti.

The Embassy of the United States in Bolivia is located in La Paz, with a consular agency in Santa Cruz de la Sierra.

== See also ==
- Bolivian Americans
