= Larry L. Memmott =

American diplomat

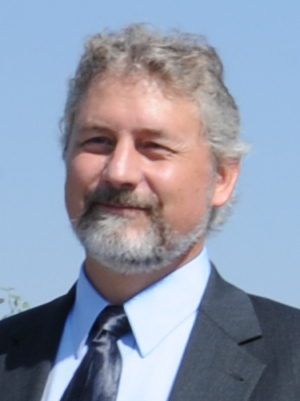
Charge d'Affaires Memmott

Larry L. Memmott (born 1960) is an American diplomat who had served Chargé d’Affaires of the U.S. Embassy in Bolivia, effective July 2012 until February 28, 2014. He found his biggest challenge in Bolivia to establish a relationship with the Bolivian government to be one based on trust. Memmott became Deputy Chief of Mission at the Embassy in Kuwait on September 10, 2018 and took over leadership of Embassy Kuwait as Chargé d'affaires a.i. on October 5, 2019.

== Bolivia ==
While there, the Bolivian President, in his speeches, spoke of the United States "always in a derogatory negative tone" and proceeded to order the expulsion of USAID without consultation. It was Memmott's responsibility to oversee their departure.

Memmott was considered a dove in U.S. Secret Services circles. Washington decided to make "a tactical shift" and replace all Embassy personnel before Jefferson Brown arrived as interim business attaché. The business attaché is "The highest ranking official present in the country since President Evo Morales expelled Ambassador Philip Golberg (sic) in 2008, for engaging in subversive activity in conjunction with hard-line opposition forces in the city of Santa Cruz. All indications point toward the replacement of the entire staff, giving greater weight to secret services and increasing efforts to destabilize the Morales government, within the framework of a regional counter-offensive."

== Education ==
Memmott began his Foreign Service career in 1987 with a Post in Bolivia. Memmott attended the University of Utah and earned a bachelor's degree in international political and economic relations. He completed graduate work in economics at the University of Chicago.
