= Ronald D. Godard =

American diplomat (born 1942)

Ronald Duane Godard (born July 8, 1942) is an American retired diplomat who was a career Foreign Service Officer with the grade of Minister Counselor. He was given the temporary rank of Ambassador in July 1998.

== Early life ==
Godard was born in Anadarko, Oklahoma on July 8, 1942. He moved around often as a child due to his father's work in the oil business and they moved to Odessa, Texas when he was in the ninth grade. After graduating from high school in Odessa, he went on to study at Odessa College. Godard was inspired by his history teacher Mary Jane Gentry and his plan was to study history and become a professor. He graduated from the University of Texas in Austin with a Bachelor of Arts degree in history and a Master of Arts degree in Latin American Studies.

== Career ==
On January 8, 2001, Godard was sworn-in as Ambassador to Guyana. Previous assignments included Deputy Permanent Representative to the Organization of American States (OAS) at the same time he served as Deputy Chief of Mission of the U.S. Mission to the OAS; Deputy Chief of Mission and then Acting Chief of Mission at the U.S. Embassy in Buenos Aires, Argentina and the same positions in Managua, Nicaragua. He was close to retiring from the Foreign Service in 2003 when he was assigned to be Diplomat-in-Residence to the University of Illinois at Chicago (UIC). For a year he was recruiting for the Department of State and taught an honors seminar on international affairs.

In October 2015, when the United Nations General Assembly took a vote on ending the Cuban Embargo, the US was one of only two countries to vote against lifting the embargo. At the time, Godard was the U.S. senior adviser for Western Hemisphere affairs and he said “Cuban leaders would be "mistaken" if they thought the vote would further efforts to improve relations between the two countries. He added that normalization of relations will take "years of persistence and dedication on both sides."”
