= Peter M. Brennan =

American diplomat

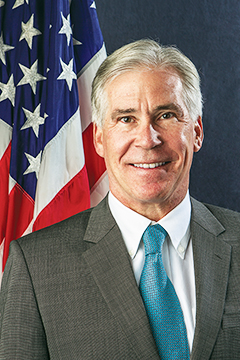
Peter M Brennan

Peter Brennan is an American diplomat who had served Chargé d'affaires to Bolivia.

== Career ==
While the American Chargé d'affaires to Bolivia, Peter M. Brennan was an object of an official complaint by the Bolivian government for having met with members of the opposition. Before this, he was accused of "conspiracy and interference in internal affairs." President Evo Morales had threatened to expel Brennan on more than one occasion, claiming "the US embassy planned to attack the government with accusations such as corruption and drug trafficking." He expelled Ambassador Philip Goldberg in 2008.

Brennan was appointed Chargé d'Affaires in June 2014. He was also Chargé d'Affaires to Costa Rica.

Brennan has been said to promote what are called "democratic initiatives" by the National Endowment for Democracy (NED) and United States Aid for International Development (USAID). While second in command in Nicaragua, in March 2003, he told Enrique Bolaños' Chief of Staff General Julio César Avilés that an estimated $2.3 million in military aid "was to be suspended until the government destroyed all missiles and defensive military capacity assembled by the Sandinistas over a 10 year period. He was one among those responsible for maintaining political stability in Pakistan and promoted trips for youth to the United States to learn about 'democratic initiatives.'" He engaged in "multiple subversive efforts in Cuba." He was one of four State Department officials who "took advantage of an official visit to discuss migratory issues to secretly meet with Cuban dissidents, whose subversive efforts are organized and financed by the U.S. government."

He graduated from Georgetown University's School of Foreign Service (BSFS, 1977) and did graduate work at both Georgetown and George Washington University.
