= Ben S. Stephansky =

American diplomat

Ben Solomon Stephansky (November 10, 1913 – April 17, 1999) was a Russian-born American diplomat. Referred to as “John F. Kennedy's Ambassador to Bolivia at a complex time in its history", he was Deputy United States Representative to the Organization of American States with the personal rank of Ambassador in 1967 and 1968.

Stephansky was born in Kiev on November 10, 1913, and came to the United States in 1915. He grew up in Milwaukee. He received a bachelor's degree from the University of Wisconsin in 1939, a master's degree and a Ph.D. in economics in 1950 from the University of Wisconsin-Madison. He died from lymphoma at his home in Washington, D.C., on April 17, 1999, at the age of 85.

== Bolivia ==
By the time Kennedy took office in 1961, Bolivia was in the 10th year of the Bolivian National Revolution (that followed a rebellion in 1952 touched off by the Nationalist Revolutionary Movement). Their leader Victor Paz Estenssoro became President for four years. He was re-elected in 1960.

In his book Bolivia: The Uncompleted Revolution, (Books on Demand, 1970)), political scientist, James M. Malloy, wrote that the Kennedy Administration had ”a positive aim to make Bolivia a showcase of guided 'democratic revolutionary' change.' ... Previously high aid commitments were increased and broadened and a pro-revolution Ambassador, Benjamin Stephansky, was sent to La Paz. ... Paz Estenssoro ... came to believe that Kennedy would be very generous in giving aid to Bolivia. ... Paz then decided to go all the way with the United States and to shape his regime in close accordance with the expectations of the Alliance for Progress, the aid program for Latin America that the Kennedy Administration began in 1961.”

The day before Stephansky's nomination, the White House announced Bolivia accepted nearly $10 million in immediate economic aid and relief. Also, a plan was approved whereby “the Inter-American Development Bank, the United States and West Germany would make capital and technical expertise available, and Bolivia would reduce and discipline its work force.”

In August 1963, the Bolivian Cabinet resigned. Stephansky had already announced he would be returning to the US at the end of the year due to his wife's health problems. In 1964, there was a junta and the Bolivian military seized power.
