= Members of the Council on Foreign Relations =

Membership in the Council on Foreign Relations comes in two types: Individual and Corporate. Individual memberships are further subdivided into two types: Life Membership and Term Membership, the latter of which is for a single period of five years and is available to those between the ages of 30 and 36 at the time of their application. Only U.S. citizens (native born or naturalized) and permanent residents who have applied for U.S. citizenship are eligible. A candidate for life membership must be nominated in writing by one Council member and seconded by a minimum of three others (strongly encouraged to be other CFR members).

Corporate membership (250 in total) is divided into three levels: "Founders" (US$100,000); "President's Circle" (US$60,000); and "Affiliates" (US$30,000). All corporate executive members have opportunities to hear distinguished speakers, such as overseas presidents and prime ministers, chairs and CEOs of multinational corporations, and U.S. officials and Congressmen. President's Circle and Founders are also entitled to other benefits, including attendance at small, private dinners or receptions with senior American officials and world leaders.

== Board of directors ==
The board of directors of the Council on Foreign Relations is composed of 36 directors and 14 officers. It also has an international advisory board (which has no role in CFR governance) consisting of distinguished individuals from across the world.

Office	Name
Chairman of the board	David Rubenstein
Vice chairman	Blair Effron
Vice chairman	Jami Miscik
President	Michael Froman
Board of directors	
Nicholas F. Beim	partner at Venrock, Dataminr and Rebellion Defense board
Afsaneh Mashayekhi Beschloss	founder and CEO of RockCreek, former treasurer and chief investment officer of the World Bank
Margaret Brennan
Sylvia Mathews Burwell	lecturer at American University, former HHS Secretary
Kenneth I. Chenault	chairman and managing director of General Catalyst
Tony Coles	executive chairman and CEO of Cerevel Therapeutics
Cesar Conde	chairman of NBCUniversal News Group
Michele Flournoy	partner, WestExec Advisors
Jane Fraser	CEO, Citigroup
Stephen C. Freidheim	CIO, founder, and managing partner of Cyrus Capital Partners
James P. Gorman	chairman and CEO of Morgan Stanley
Stephen Hadley	principal of Rice, Hadley, Gates and Manuel
Margaret Ann "Peggy" Hamburg	former U.S. FDA commissioner
William Hurd	
Charles R. Kaye	chairman Warburg Pincus
James Manyika	SVP Google, McKinsey Global Institute chairman and director emeritus
William H. McRaven	Professor of National Security at the LBJ School of Public Affairs at UT Austin, retired admiral formerly in charge of the U.S. Special Operations Command
Justin G. Muzinich	
Janet Napolitano	former DHS Secretary
Meghan O'Sullivan	Trilateral Commission North American chair, Harvard Kennedy School professor, former deputy national security adviser
Deven J. Parekh	managing director of Insight Partners
Charles Phillips	former chairman of Infor
Richard Plepler	founder and CEO of Eden Productions, former chairman and CEO of Home Box Office, Inc.
Ruth Porat	President, CFO, and Chief Investment Officer of Alphabet and Google
Laurene Powell Jobs	founder and president of Emerson Collective
L. Rafael Reif	president emeritus of MIT
Mariko Silver
James Taiclet	CEO, Lockheed Martin
Frances Townsend	CBS national security analyst, former Homeland Security Advisor
Tracey T. Travis	Estée Lauder Companies executive vice president and CFO
Fareed Zakaria	host, CNN
Amy Zegart

== Notable council members ==
- Gina Kay Abercrombie-Winstanley (chief diversity and inclusion officer for the U.S. State Department)
- John Abizaid (U.S. Army general, former head of Centcom)
- Elliott Abrams (lawyer, former State Department official)
- Stacey Abrams (Georgia representative and minority leader)
- Michael F. Adams (president of University of Georgia)
- Stephen J. Adler (Reuters editor-in-chief)
- Madeleine Albright (U.S. Secretary of State, 1997–2001, and UN Ambassador 1993–1997)
- Lamar Alexander (45th governor of Tennessee, U.S. senator, fifth United States Secretary of Education)
- David Altshuler (geneticist; Vertex Pharmaceuticals CEO)
- Anthony Clark Arend (lawyer; academic)
- Adam Aron (president and CEO of AMC Theatres)
- Erik Arroyo (politician and lawyer)
- Anders Åslund (former Atlantic Council senior fellow)
- Ken Auletta (The New Yorker media critic)
- Lloyd J. Austin III (U.S. Secretary of Defense, 2021–2025)
- Bruce Babbitt (governor of Arizona, 1978–1987; U.S. Secretary of the Interior, 1993–2001)
- James A. Baker III (U.S. Secretary of State, 1989–1992, U.S. Secretary of the Treasury, 1985–1988; White House Chief of Staff 1981–1985 and 1992–1993)
- Thurbert Baker (former Attorney General of Georgia)
- Michael D. Barnes (former U.S. congressman from Maryland)
- Kara Medoff Barnett (executive director of American Ballet Theatre; former director of Lincoln Center)
- Charlene Barshefsky (former U.S. Trade Representative)
- Edward H. Bastian (CEO of Delta Air Lines)
- Evan Bayh (former U.S. senator and 46th governor of Indiana)
- Warren Beatty (actor, producer, director, activist)
- Elizabeth Becker (author and journalist)
- Peter Beinart (academic; columnist)
- Robert A. Belfer (Enron investor)
- Peter Bergen (journalist and national security analyst for CNN)
- Nicolas Berggruen (founder, Berggruen Institute)
- Howard Berman (former U.S. congressman from California)
- Michael Beschloss (presidential scholar)
- Scott Bessent (U.S. Secretary of the Treasury, 2025–present; founder of Key Square Group)
- Richard E. Besser (Robert Wood Johnson Foundation president and CEO)
- Jeffrey Bewkes (president of Time Warner)
- Stephen Biddle (theorist setting U.S. counter-insurgency policy)
- Sanford Bishop (U.S. congressman from Georgia)
- Leon Black (Museum of Modern Art co-chair)
- Robert D. Blackwill (Henry A. Kissinger Senior Fellow for U.S. Foreign Policy
- Alan Blinken (former U.S. Ambassador to Belgium)
- Antony Blinken (U.S. Secretary of State, 2021–2025)
- Donald M. Blinken (former director of Warburg Pincus)
- Michael R. Bloomberg (mayor of New York City, 2002–2013; founder of Bloomberg L.P.)
- Lincoln P. Bloomfield Jr. (U.S. State Department official and defense expert)
- Lee Bollinger (19th president of Columbia University; former chair, Federal Reserve Bank of New York)
- Josh Bolten (22nd White House Chief of Staff)
- Max Boot (Washington Post journalist, military historian and foreign policy writer)
- Rudolph (Rudy) Boschwitz (U.S. senator from Minnesota, 1978–1991)
- danah boyd (professor; senior researcher at Microsoft)
- Bill Bradley (former U.S. senator from New Jersey, 1979–1997; NBA Hall of Fame New York Knicks player, 1967–1977)
- Lael Brainard (Federal Reserve Board member; former Treasury official)
- Marcus W. Brauchli (executive editor of The Washington Post, 2008–2012)
- L. Paul Bremer (diplomat)
- Ian Bremmer (Eurasia Group founder and president)
- Lanny A. Breuer (Covington & Burling vice chair, U.S. Assistant A.G. for the Criminal Division 2009–2013)
- James W. (Jim) Breyer (boards of Blackstone Group, Harvard Corporation, Walmart, Facebook, WEF)
- Stephen G. Breyer (former U.S. Supreme Court justice, Rhodes scholar)
- Steven Brill (CourtTV founder)
- Tom Brokaw (author, NBC News journalist)
- Edgar Bronfman Jr. (Seagram heir)
- Ethan Bronner (deputy foreign editor of The New York Times)
- Kate Brown (former governor of Oregon)
- Erin Burnett (CNN anchor, journalist)
- William J. Burns (8th Director of the CIA 2021–2025, Deputy Secretary of State 2011–2014, 5th U.S. Ambassador to Russia 2005–2008)
- Dan Burton (former U.S. congressman from Indiana)
- Sylvia Mathews Burwell (former president of American University, HHS Secretary 2014–2017
- Jonathan S. Bush (healthcare CEO)
- Craig Calhoun (president of Berggruen Institute, Director of the London School of Economics)
- Elizabeth Cameron (senior director for Global Health Security and Biodefense on the U.S. National Security Council)
- Kurt M. Campbell (State Dept. official)
- Jimmy Carter (39th president of the United States)
- Carey Cavanaugh (diplomat and professor)
- Gerald L. Chan (brother of Ronnie C. Chan, son of Harvard T.H. Chan School of Public Health namesake)
- Ronnie C. Chan (billionaire)
- Juju Chang (journalist/reporter for ABC News)
- Elaine Chao (former Secretary of Transportation and Secretary of Labor)
- Kenneth I. Chenault (former head of American Express 2001–2018)
- Henry Cisneros (10th U.S. HUD Secretary)
- Wesley Kanne Clark (Supreme Allied Commander Europe 1997–2000)
- Bill Clinton (42nd president of the United States)
- Chelsea Clinton (Clinton Foundation board member)
- George Clooney (actor, director, screenwriter, producer)
- David S. Cohen (5th and 8th Deputy Director of the CIA 2015–2017 and 2021– )
- Richard "Dick" Cohen (Washington Post columnist 1976–2019)
- Susan M. Collins (U.S. senator from Maine)
- Katie Couric (former CBS and NBC journalist)
- Edward F. Cox (attorney, chairman of the New York Republican Party)
- Michael Crow (president of Arizona State University)
- Kenneth Cukier (ex-Red Herring journalist)
- William M. Daley (White House chief of staff 2011–2012, U.S. Commerce Secretary 1997–2000)
- John J. "Jack" DeGioia (Georgetown University president 2001–present)
- John M. Deutch (Director of CIA 1995–1996)
- Jackson Diehl (Washington Post editorial page deputy editor)
- Jamie Dimon (chairman and CEO of JPMorgan Chase)
- Chris Dodd (U.S. senator from Connecticut 1981–2011)
- Eileen C. Donahoe (former U.S. Ambassador)
- Thomas R. Donahue (former Secretary-Treasurer of the AFL–CIO)
- William H. Donaldson (former chairman of the SEC)
- Joan Donovan (research director at Shorenstein Center)
- Michael Douglas (actor)
- James S. Doyle (journalist and activist)
- Kimberly Dozier (journalist for BBC, CBS, AP, CNN, Daily Beast)
- David Dreier (chairman of the Fallen Journalists Memorial Foundation, former chairman of Tribune Publishing, former U.S. congressman from California)
- Richard Dreyfuss (actor, writer)
- Kenneth Duberstein (13th White House chief of staff)
- Joseph Duffey (academic, educator)
- Regina Dugan (Wellcome Leap CEO 2020–, DARPA director 2009–2012)
- Peggy Dulany (heiress, philanthropist)
- Mervyn M. Dymally (former Democratic U.S. congressman from California)
- Jesse Dylan (film director)
- Esther Dyson (philanthropist, technology analyst)
- Jen Easterly (director, Cybersecurity and Infrastructure Security Agency)
- John Edwards (former U.S. senator from North Carolina)
- Blair Effron (CFR vice chair)
- Karl Eikenberry (U.S. Army general, former U.S. Ambassador to Afghanistan)
- Luigi R. Einaudi (former secretary-general of the OAS)
- Jessica Einhorn (ex-director of CFR, ex-managing director at World Bank, dean of SAIS)
- Christopher Elias (president of Bill & Melinda Gates Foundation Global Development Program 2011– )
- Keith Ellison (30th Attorney General of Minnesota, former U.S. congressman from Minnesota)
- Larry Ellison CEO of Oracle Corporation
- Ezekiel "Zeke" Emanuel (COVID-19 Advisory Board member)
- Richard Engel (NBC News foreign correspondent)
- Dianne Feinstein (U.S. senator from California 1992–2023, mayor of San Francisco 1978–1988)
- Martin Feldstein (economist, Harvard professor)
- Roger W. Ferguson Jr. (former vice chairman of the Federal Reserve)
- Bernard T. Ferrari (dean of Johns Hopkins University's Carey Business School)
- Laurence "Larry" Fink (BlackRock CEO 1988–)
- John B. Fitzgibbons (businessman and philanthropist)
- Michèle Angélique Flournoy (Under Secretary of Defense for Policy 2009–2012)
- Tom Foley (Speaker of the U.S. House of Representatives 1989–1995)
- Kristin Forbes, CBE (MIT professor)
- Abe Foxman (Anti-Defamation League national director emeritus)
- Donald M. Fraser (former U.S. congressman from Minnesota)
- Mikhail Fridman (Russian oligarch)
- Tom Frieden (16th director of the CDC 2009–2017)
- Thomas Friedman (columnist for The New York Times)
- Bill Frist (former U.S. Senate Majority Leader from Tennessee)
- Ann M. Fudge (board member, Bill & Melinda Gates Foundation)
- Francis Fukuyama (political scientist, former State Department official)
- James K. Galbraith (professor at LBJ School at UT Austin, Senior Scholar with Levy Economics Institute of Bard College)
- Peter W. Galbraith (U.S. Ambassador to Croatia 1993–1998)
- Pamela Gann (president of Claremont McKenna College, former dean of Duke University School of Law)
- Eric Garcetti (U.S. Ambassador to India, 2023–2025; Mayor of Los Angeles, 2013–2022)
- Lulu Garcia-Navarro (NPR host)
- Henry Louis Gates (PBS host, Harvard professor)
- Robert M. Gates (U.S. Secretary of Defense 2006–2011, Director of Central Intelligence 1991–1993)
- David Geffen (president of Universal Music Group)
- Timothy Geithner (U.S. Secretary of the Treasury 2009–2013 under Obama, President of the N.Y. Fed 2003–2009)
- Sam Gejdenson (former Democratic U.S. congressman from Connecticut)
- Barton Gellman (Washington Post journalist)
- Robert P. George (academic, professor at Princeton University, theologian, philosopher)
- Dick Gephardt (Majority Leader of the U.S. House of Representatives 1989–1995 from Missouri)
- Julie Gerberding (CDC director 2002–2009)
- David Gergen (Harvard Kennedy School professor, presidential advisor)
- James S. Gilmore III (governor of Virginia 1998–2002)
- Bonnie Glick (former Deputy Administrator of U.S. Agency for International Development 2019–2020)
- Peter C. Goldmark Jr. (CEO of the Port Authority of New York and New Jersey 1977–1985, president of Rockefeller Foundation 1988–1997, ex-publisher of International Herald Tribune)
- Bianna Golodryga (journalist)
- Roy M. Goodman (former New York State senator)
- Michael R. Gordon (national security correspondent for The Wall Street Journal)
- Al Gore - U.S. Senator and U.S. Vice President
- Jamie Gorelick (28th U.S. Deputy Attorney General)
- Porter Goss (former U.S. congressman from Florida, Director of CIA 2004–2006)
- Bob Graham (38th governor of Florida and U.S. senator)
- Elizabeth (Lally) Graham Weymouth (journalist, Washington Post editor)
- Evan G. Greenberg (Chubb Limited president and CEO 2004–)
- Maurice R. "Hank" Greenberg (CFR board member 1992–2002 and 2004–2009)
- Jonathan Greenblatt (director and CEO of ADL 2015–present)
- Alan Greenspan, KBE (chairman of the Federal Reserve 1987–2006)
- Janet G. Mullins Grissom (lobbyist, former U.S. State Department official)
- Tenzin Gyatso (14th Dalai Lama)
- Richard N. Haass (CFR president 2003–present, Director of Policy Planning at U.S. State Department 2001–2003 under George W. Bush, Rhodes scholar)
- Morton Halperin (Open Society Foundations senior adviser, Director of Policy Planning 1998–2001 under Clinton, formerly at Brookings Institution, Carnegie Endowment, ACLU, colleague of Kissinger at Harvard and NSC)
- Lee H. Hamilton (former Democratic U.S. congressman from Indiana, 9/11 Commission vice chair)
- Jane Harman (Wilson Center president emerita 2011–, Trilateral Commission member, Aspen Strategy Group)
- David Harris (director of the American Jewish Committee)
- Josh Harris (co-founder of Apollo Global Management and owner of several sports teams)
- Gary Hart (former Democratic U.S. senator from Colorado, Council for a Livable World chairman, advisory board member for the Partnership for a Secure America)
- Michael Hayden (U.S. Air Force general, 15th director of the National Security Agency, National Security Adviser under Clinton and 20th director of the CIA under George W. Bush)
- Katrina vanden Heuvel (editor of The Nation, wife of Stephen F. Cohen, daughter of William vanden Heuvel)
- William vanden Heuvel (diplomat and international lawyer, father of Katrina vanden Heuvel)
- Heather Higgins (women's advocate, chairman of the Independent Women's Forum, president of the Randolph Foundation)
- Fiona Hill (The Globalist writer, former Senior Director for Europe and Russia of the NSC under first Trump administration, Trilateral Commission member)
- Carla Anderson Hills (CFR co-chair 2007–2017, U.S. HUD Secretary 1975–1977 under Ford, U.S. Trade Representative 1989–1993 under George H. W. Bush, Trilateral Commission member)
- Leo Hindery (businessman, philanthropist)
- Deane R. Hinton (former diplomat)
- Mellody Hobson (president and co-CEO of Ariel Investments, chairwoman of Starbucks)
- Malcolm Hoenlein (vice chairman of the Conference of Presidents of Major American Jewish Organizations)
- Auren Hoffman (investor/entrepreneur)
- Reid Hoffman (founder of LinkedIn)
- Warren Hoge (former New York Times journalist)
- Kim Holmes (foreign policy and defense expert)
- Christopher B. Howard (Robert Morris University president, Harvard Board of Overseers, Rhodes scholar, Trilateral Commission, Aspen Strategy Group)
- Douglas Holtz-Eakin (economist)
- David A. Hunt (Democratic former Oregon House Speaker)
- Robert Hunter (former Ambassador to NATO) under Presidency of Bill Clinton 1993–1998))
- Will Hurd (GOP U.S. congressman from Texas 2015–2021, ex-CIA clandestine officer 2000–2009)
- Adi Ignatius (editor-in-chief of Harvard Business Review, former deputy managing editor for Time, brother of David Ignatius)
- David Ignatius (Washington Post journalist, Body of Lies author, Aspen Strategy Group, Trilateral Commission member)
- Martin Indyk (British-Australian CFR distinguished fellow, Brookings Institution executive vice president 2001–2018, U.S. Ambassador to Israel 1995–1997 and 2000–2001 under Clinton)
- Bobby Ray Inman (retired admiral, former NSA Director under Carter 1977–1981)
- Walter Isaacson (Tulane professor 2018–, Amanpour & Co. correspondent 2018–, Aspen Institute president and CEO 2003–2018, LRA vice chair, CNN chair and CEO 2001–2003, Time editor 1996–2001, Rhodes scholar, author of Code Breaker, Kissinger, etc.)
- Roberta S. Jacobson (former NSC "border czar" under Biden)
- James E. Johnson (NYC corporation counsel 2019–present, Under Secretary of the Treasury for Terrorism and Financial Intelligence 1998–2001, ex-SDNY Assistant U.S. Attorney)
- Jay L. Johnson (retired U.S. Navy admiral, 26th Chief of Naval Operations 1996–2000, ex-president and CEO of General Dynamics)
- Jeh Johnson (4th DHS Secretary 2013–2017 under Obama, former SDNY Assistant U.S. Attorney)
- Nancy Johnson (former GOP U.S. congresswoman from Connecticut)
- Sheila Johnson (businesswoman, president of the Washington Mystics)
- Robert Wood ("Woody") Johnson IV (investor, owner of the New York Jets, heir to Johnson & Johnson, ex-ambassador to the UK 2017–2021 under Trump)
- Angelina Jolie, DCMG (actor, producer, director, "UN Goodwill Ambassador")
- Alex S. Jones (Harvard Kennedy School's Shorenstein Center director 2000–2015)
- Boisfeuillet Jones Jr. (Washington Post ex-CEO and publisher, Rhodes scholar)
- Vernon Jordan (adviser to Clinton)
- Kenneth Juster (U.S. Ambassador to India 2021–present under Biden, Trilateral Commission ex-member)
- Robert P. Kadlec (HHS ASPR 2017–2021 under Trump, oversaw 2019 Crimson Contagion pandemic exercise)
- Joseph Kahn (managing editor of The New York Times)
- C.S. Eliot Kang (diplomat)
- Walter H. Kansteiner III (diplomat, founding principal of The Scowcroft Group)
- Jonathan Karl (ABC News journalist)
- Nancy Kassebaum (former GOP U.S. senator from Kansas, daughter of Alf Landon, and wife of Howard Baker)
- Rebecca Katz (director of the Center for Global Health Science & Security at Georgetown University Medical Center, CFR pandemic task force member)
- Peter J. Katzenstein, FBA (political scientist, Cornell academic)
- Thomas Kean (GOP politician, governor of New Jersey 1982–1990, and chair of the 9/11 Commission, 2002–2004)
- Raymond W. Kelly (37th and 41st police commissioner of NYC under Mayor Dinkins and Mayor Bloomberg, KBE)
- Frederick Kempe (Atlantic Council president and CEO)
- Muhtar Kent (ex-CEO and chairman of The Coca-Cola Company)
- John Forbes Kerry (1st "Climate Czar" under Biden, former Democratic U.S. senator from Massachusetts 1985–2013, 68th U.S. Secretary of State 2013–2017 under Obama, and Forbes family member whose electoral history includes 2004 presidential candidacy)
- Vanessa Kerry (M.D., director of the Program in Global Public Policy and Social Change at Harvard Medical School, liberal activist, daughter of John Kerry)
- Glenn Kessler ("Fact Checker" ex-columnist at The Washington Post)
- Zalmay Khalilzad (26th UN Ambassador under George W. Bush)
- Joe Klein (Time magazine columnist)
- Amy Klobuchar (Democratic U.S. senator from Minnesota, ex-prosecutor in Minneapolis)
- Richard Kogan (former CEO of Schering-Plough 1996–2003, board member of Colgate-Palmolive and The Bank of New York Mellon)
- Nicholas D. Kristof (New York Times columnist, Trilateral Commission, Aspen Strategy Group, Rhodes scholar)
- Paul R. Krugman (New York Times columnist, economist)
- Anil Kumar (businessman, former senior partner at McKinsey)
- Philip Lader (diplomat, chairman of WPP Group)
- Eric S. Lander (MIT scientist, director of the Office of Science and Technology Policy and Science Advisor to the President 2021– under Biden)
- Richard W. Lariviere (scholar, president of the University of Oregon)
- Leonard Lauder (elder brother of Ron Lauder, son of Estée Lauder)
- Ronald S. Lauder (World Jewish Congress president 2007– succeeding Edgar Bronfman Sr.)
- William P. Lauder (Estée Lauder Companies CEO, son of Leonard Lauder)
- Risa Lavizzo-Mourey (Robert Wood Johnson Foundation president and CEO 2003–2017)
- Jim Leach (former GOP U.S. congressman from Iowa, chairman of the NEH under Obama)
- Jim Lehrer (journalist, former anchor for PBS NewsHour)
- Jack Lew (76th U.S. Treasury Secretary and White House chief of staff under Obama, ex-COO at Citigroup 2006–2008)
- John Lewis (Democratic U.S. congressman from Georgia, civil rights leader)
- Mara Liasson (NPR national political correspondent)
- Joe Lieberman (former Democratic and Independent U.S. senator from Connecticut, Democratic candidate for U.S. Vice President in 2000 election)
- Lewis "Scooter" Libby (attorney, former chief of staff to Vice President Dick Cheney)
- Herbert London (academic, activist, ex-dean of NYU's Gallatin School, ex-president of Hudson Institute)
- Frank Luntz (GOP consultant, pollster)
- Nigel Lythgoe (ex-producer of American Idol, So You Think You Can Dance judge)
- Greg Maffei (president and CEO of Liberty Media, chairman of Live Nation Entertainment, SiriusXM and TripAdvisor, former CFO of Oracle and Microsoft)
- Katherine Maher (formerly at Wikimedia Foundation, WEF, World Bank, UNICEF, HSBC)
- Fred Malek (businessman, former president of Marriott Hotels and Northwest Airlines)
- David Malpass (economist, GOP politician)
- James Manyika (academic, business executive, SVP Google-Alphabet, Chair emeritus Mckinsey Global Institute)
- David A. Marcus (ex-president of PayPal, ex-head of Facebook Messenger)
- Rebecca Mark-Jusbasche (ex-head of Enron International, Azurix in Argentina water suit)
- Kati Marton (author/journalist)
- William F. Martin (6th Deputy Secretary of Energy and Executive Secretary of the National Security Council under Reagan)
- Alejandro Mayorkas (DHS Secretary 2021–present under Biden)
- Barry McCaffrey (retired U.S. Army general, analyst, "Drug Czar" 1996–2001 under Clinton)
- Stan McChrystal (retired U.S. Army general, JSOC commander 2003–2008 for Afghanistan, central figure in War Machine)
- David McCormick (CEO of Bridgewater Associates, Aspen Strategy Group)
- David McCourt (Irish-American entrepreneur with experience within the telecom and cable television industries)
- Cynthia McFadden (NBC News legal correspondent 2014–present, ABC News correspondent 1994–2014)
- Robert C. "Bud" McFarlane (national security advisor 1983–1985 under Reagan)
- Thomas F. "Mack" McLarty, III (White House chief of staff 1993–1994 under Clinton, ex-partner in Kissinger McLarty Associates)
- William H. McRaven (retired admiral, USSOC commander 2011–2014, JSOC commander 2008–2011 succeeding McChrystal)
- Christopher C. Miller (acting U.S. Defense Secretary 2020–2021 succeeding Mark Esper under Trump)
- Judith Miller (Pulitzer-winning New York Times ex-journalist known for Iraqi WMD and Plame stories, Aspen Strategy Group ex-member)
- William Green Miller (2nd U.S. Ambassador to Ukraine under Clinton)
- Judith A. "Jami" Miscik (CFR vice chairwoman of the board, CIA Deputy Director for Intelligence 2002–2005, Global Head of Sovereign Risk at Lehman Brothers 2005–2008, PIAB chair 2014–2017 under Obama, president and vice chairman of Kissinger Associates 2009–, Trilateral Commission member)
- Andrea Mitchell (NBC News journalist, spouse of Alan Greenspan KBE, Trilateral Commission member)
- George J. Mitchell GBE (CFR board 1995–2005, Senate Majority Leader 1989–1995 as a Democratic U.S. senator from Maine, Vice Chair of the 9/11 Commission Nov.–Dec. 2002, Walt Disney Company chairman 2004–2007)
- Lisa O. Monaco (U.S. Deputy Attorney General 2021– under Biden)
- Walter Mondale (VPOTUS 1977–1981 under Carter, Democratic presidential candidate for the 1984 election)
- Les Moonves (ex-president and CEO of CBS 2003–2018)
- Terry Moran (ABC News journalist)
- Robert Mosbacher Jr. (businessman, son of Robert Mosbacher)
- Langhorne A. Motley (former diplomat and U.S. State Department official)
- David Mulford (21st U.S. Ambassador to India under George W. Bush, ex-executive at Credit Suisse, Hoover Institution fellow)
- Rupert Murdoch (founder, chairman and CEO of News Corp and Fox News)
- Janet Napolitano (CFR board 2016–, 20th president of the University of California 2013–2020, 3rd U.S. DHS Secretary 2009–2013 under Obama, 21st governor of Arizona 2003–2009)
- John D. Negroponte (U.S. Deputy Secretary of State 2007–2009 under George W. Bush, UN Ambassador 2001–2004 under George W. Bush, 1st Director of National Intelligence 2005–2007 under George W. Bush, subject of The Ambassador, brother of MIT Media Lab founder Nicholas Negroponte, Trilateral Commission member)
- Diana Villiers Negroponte (lawyer, wife of John Negroponte)
- Eleanor Holmes Norton (delegate from the D.C. at-large district)
- Joseph S. Nye Jr. (Harvard Kennedy School academic, Assistant Secretary of Defense for International Security Affairs under Clinton, British Academy, Rhodes scholar, Trilateral Commission member)
- Stan O'Neal (former chairman and CEO of Merrill Lynch)
- Peter L. Osnos (Washington Post journalist 1966–1984, father of journalist Evan Osnos)
- Meghan O'Sullivan (board of CFR and Raytheon, Trilateral Commission North American chair)
- Tara O'Toole (Senior Fellow and executive vice president at In-Q-Tel, Under Secretary of Homeland Security for Science and Technology 2009–2013 under Obama, principal author and producer of Operation Dark Winter and Atlantic Storm bioterror scenarios)
- Robert Pastor (national security adviser, son-in-law to Robert McNamara)
- George Pataki (53rd governor of New York)
- Henry Paulson (74th U.S. Treasury Secretary under George W. Bush)
- Christina H. Paxson (19th president of Brown University)
- Federico Peña former Secretary of United States Department of Transportation under the Clinton Administration, former Mayor of Denver
- Peter G. Peterson (20th U.S. Commerce Secretary under Nixon)
- David Petraeus (retired U.S. Army general, former head of Centcom 2008–2010, 22nd director of the CIA 2011–2012 under Obama, Trilateral Commission, Aspen Strategy Group)
- Tom Petri (GOP U.S. congressman from Wisconsin)
- Steve Pieczenik (former U.S. State Department official)
- Kitty Pilgrim (journalist and anchor on CNN)
- Walter Pincus (Pulitzer-winning Washington Post national security correspondent 1975–2015, played role in Plame affair)
- Daniel Pipes (academic, writer, historian, son of Richard Pipes)
- Norman Podhoretz (former editor-in-chief of Commentary, senior fellow at the Hudson Institute, Project for the New American Century (PNAC) signatory)
- Steve Poizner (California businessman and GOP politician)
- Jared Polis current Governor of Colorado and retired congressman from Boulder
- Roman Popadiuk (1st U.S. Ambassador to Ukraine under George W. Bush and Clinton, Executive Director of the George Bush Presidential Library Foundation)
- Arturo C. Porzecanski (Wall Street economist and university professor)
- Maury Povich - News media, The Maury Povich Show
- Jerome Powell (16th chair of the Federal Reserve 2018– )
- Laurene Powell Jobs (CFR board member, founder of Emerson Collective that owns The Atlantic, widow of Steve Jobs)
- Charles Prince (former CEO of Citigroup)
- JB Pritzker - 43rd Governor of Illinois
- Penny Pritzker (Carnegie Endowment chairwoman, sister of 43rd governor of Illinois J. B. Pritzker, daughter of Hyatt Hotels co-founder Donald Pritzker, 38th U.S. Secretary of Commerce under Obama, Aspen Strategy Group)
- Thomas Pritzker (executive chairman of Hyatt Hotels, son of Hyatt co-founder Jay Pritzker, and cousin of Penny and J. B. Pritzker)
- Jennifer Raab (president of Hunter College)
- Gina M. Raimondo (U.S. Secretary of Commerce, 2021–2025; governor of Rhode Island, 2015–2021; Rhodes scholar)
- Dan Rather (journalist, former CBS anchor)
- Jack Reed (Democratic U.S. senator from Rhode Island 1997–present, Aspen Strategy Group)
- Edward Regan (former New York State Comptroller)
- L. Rafael Reif (president of MIT 2012–present, CFR board member)
- Janet Reno (U.S. Attorney General 1993–2001 succeeding Bill Barr under Clinton)
- Condoleezza Rice (U.S. Secretary of State 2005–2009 under George W. Bush, Aspen Strategy Group co-chair)
- Susan Rice (Domestic Policy Council director under Biden)
- Bill Richardson (senior managing director of Kissinger McLarty Associates, governor of New Mexico 2003–2010, UN Ambassador 1997–1998 and U.S. Energy Secretary 1998–2001 under Clinton, Chinese spy exposé source)
- Alice Rivlin (economist, former U.S. cabinet member)
- Chuck Robb (64th governor of Virginia, former Democratic U.S. senator from Virginia, son-in-law of Lyndon B. Johnson)
- David Rockefeller Jr. (son of former CFR chairman David Rockefeller, and father of Ariana Rockefeller)
- John D. "Jay" Rockefeller IV (Democratic U.S. senator from West Virginia 1985–2015, governor of West Virginia 1977–1985, husband of Sharon Rockefeller)
- Steven C. Rockefeller (Middlebury College professor emeritus, son of Mary Clark and Nelson Rockefeller)
- Susan Cohn Rockefeller (filmmaker, spouse of David Rockefeller Jr.)
- Valerie Rockefeller (daughter of CPB ex-chair Sharon Percy and Sen. Jay Rockefeller)
- Judith Rodin (Rockefeller Foundation president 2005–2017, University of Pennsylvania president 1994–2004)
- Charlie Rose (former journalist at CBS and PBS, host of The Charlie Rose Show 1991–2017)
- Jack Rosen (American Jewish Congress president)
- Jeffrey A. Rosen (former U.S. Deputy Attorney General 2019–2020 under Trump)
- Liz Rosenberg (novelist, poet, columnist for The Boston Globe)
- Gary N. Ross (energy economist)
- David J. Rothkopf (author, former managing director of Kissinger Associates, former Johns Hopkins Bloomberg School of Public Health advisory board member)
- Lynn Forester de Rothschild (businesswoman)
- Cecilia Elena Rouse (30th chair of the Council of Economic Advisers under Biden, former dean of the Woodrow Wilson School)
- David Rubenstein (CFR chair, Carlyle Group founder, namesake of HKS building, Trilateral Commission member, WEF trustee)
- Robert Rubin (70th U.S. Secretary of the Treasury under Clinton, former board co-chair of Goldman Sachs, Citigroup, spearheaded repeal of Glass-Steagall Act)
- Haim Saban (founder, Saban Capital Group)
- Jeffrey D. Sachs (economist, ex-director of The Earth Institute at Columbia University, Lancet COVID-19 Commission chair)
- Sheryl Sandberg (Facebook COO)
- David E. Sanger (New York Times White House and national security correspondent, Aspen Strategy Group member)
- Ruth Savord (CFR librarian)
- Diane Sawyer (journalist, ABC News)
- Anthony Scaramucci (SkyBridge Capital founder)
- Raj Shah (White House deputy press secretary 2017–2019 under Trump, Fox Corp. senior vice president 2019– )
- Rajiv J. (Raj) Shah (Rockefeller Foundation president 2017–, Trilateral Commission member)
- Bob Schieffer (author, CBS News journalist)
- Eric E. Schmidt (ex-CEO of Google, Trilateral Commission member)
- Eric P. Schmitt (Pulitzer-winning New York Times reporter of "Russia bounty" story)
- Michael N. Schmitt (G. Norman Lieber Distinguished Scholar at West Point)
- Kurt Schmoke (46th mayor of Baltimore, Rhodes scholar)
- Peter Schwartz (Global Business Network co-founder)
- Stephen M. Schwebel (jurist, former judge on the International Court of Justice)
- Dan Senor (former foreign policy advisor under George W. Bush, former Fox News foreign policy analyst)
- Donna Shalala (18th U.S. HHS Secretary under Clinton, President of the University of Miami)
- Wendy Sherman (21st U.S. Deputy Secretary of State under Biden, Trilateral Commission ex-member)
- Eduard Shevardnadze (2nd president of Georgia)
- Michael Shifter (academic, president of the Inter-American Dialogue)
- Eric Shinseki (7th U.S. Secretary of Veterans Affairs under Obama, 34th Chief of Staff of the U.S. Army under Clinton & George W. Bush)
- Amity Shlaes (Bloomberg News columnist, and historian)
- Timothy Shriver (chairman and CEO of the Special Olympics, brother of Maria Shriver, and son of Eunice Kennedy and Sargent Shriver)
- Laurence H. Silberman (U.S. circuit judge of the U.S. Court of Appeals for the D.C. Circuit 1985– )
- Adam Silver (Commissioner of the NBA 2014– succeeding David Stern, Rockefeller Foundation trustee)
- Robert Silvers (editor of New York Review of Books)
- Walter B. Slocombe (former Under Secretary of Defense for Policy)
- Joseph Sigelman (American-Philippine businessman)
- Bradford L. Smith (Microsoft president)
- Frederick W. Smith (CEO and founder of FedEx)
- Olympia Snowe (former GOP U.S. senator from Maine)
- Nancy Soderberg (alternate United Nations Ambassador under Clinton 1997–2001)
- Andrew Ross Sorkin (business journalist for The New York Times and CNBC)
- George Soros (CFR board 1995–2004, currency speculator, investor, businessman)
- Alexander Soros half-brother of Jonathan Soros, son of George Soros
- Jonathan Soros fund manager and son of George Soros
- John Spratt (former Democratic U.S. congressman from South Carolina)
- Lesley Stahl (CBS News journalist)
- James E. "Jes" Staley (Barclays ex-CEO)
- James Stavridis (Carlyle Group vice chair and managing director, Rockefeller Foundation chair 2021, co-author of 2034: A Novel of the Next World War)
- James B. Steinberg (U.S. Deputy Secretary of State 2009–2011 under Obama, Deputy National Security Advisor 1997–2001 under Clinton, Trilateral Commission, Aspen Strategy Group, Bilderberg attendee)
- David Stern (Commissioner of the NBA 1984–2014, succeeded by Adam Silver)
- Adlai Stevenson III (former Democratic U.S. senator from Illinois, son of Adlai Stevenson II)
- George Stephanopoulos (former White House press secretary under Clinton, GMA TV host, ABC News anchor, Rhodes scholar)
- Larry Summers (ex-cabinet secretary, ex-president of Harvard, Aspen Strategy Group)
- Mark Suzman (Bill & Melinda Gates Foundation CEO, Rhodes scholar)
- Paul Tagliabue (NFL Commissioner 1989–2006, Rhodes scholar)
- Jake Tapper (CNN journalist)
- Dina Temple-Raston (NPR news correspondent)
- George Tenet (CIA Director 1996–2004 under Clinton and George W. Bush)
- Linda Thomas-Greenfield (UN Ambassador 2021– under Biden)
- John L. Thornton (chairman of Brookings Institution, academic, former president of Goldman Sachs)
- Frances Townsend (U.S. Homeland Security Advisor 2004–2008 under George W. Bush)
- Kathleen Kennedy Townsend (Democratic lieutenant governor of Maryland 1995–2003, daughter of RFK and Ethel Kennedy)
- Laura Trevelyan (BBC America presenter)
- Cyrus Vance Jr. (Manhattan District Attorney 2010– )
- Tom Vilsack (U.S. Secretary of Agriculture 2009–2017 under Obama and 2021– under Biden, governor of Iowa 1999–2007)
- Kenneth Wainstein (U.S. Homeland Security Advisor 2008–2009 succeeded by John O. Brennan)
- Peter J. Wallison (White House Counsel 1986–1987 to Reagan, former lawyer to Nelson Rockefeller)
- Vicky Ward (British-born CNN journalist)
- Vin Weber (GOP U.S. congressman from Minnesota 1981–1993, Aspen Institute trustee)
- David Wehner (CFO of Facebook)
- Steven Weinberg (physicist)
- Susan Roosevelt Weld (educator and former professor)
- William Weld (governor of Massachusetts 1991–1997, DOJ Criminal Division head 1986–1988, 2020 GOP primary candidate, Rhodes scholar)
- Leana S. Wen (CNN medical analyst, Washington Post columnist, former president of Planned Parenthood, global health fellow at the W.H.O., Rhodes scholar)
- Christine Todd Whitman (50th governor of New Jersey, 9th EPA Administrator under George W. Bush)
- Shirley Williams, Baroness Williams of Crosby (British member of parliament, International Advisory Board member)
- Richard S. Williamson (diplomat, lawyer, former chairman of the Republican Party of Illinois)
- Timothy E. Wirth (ex-Democratic U.S. senator from Colorado 1987–1993, ex-congressman 1975–1987, Wirth chair namesake)
- Frank G. Wisner II (businessman and former diplomat)
- James D. Wolfensohn, KBE (9th president of the World Bank)
- Paul Wolfowitz (10th president of the World Bank, 28th U.S. Deputy Secretary of Defense under George W. Bush)
- Bob Woodruff (ABC News journalist)
- Judy Woodruff (PBS NewsHour journalist)
- R. James Woolsey (16th Director of Central Intelligence under Clinton, Rhodes scholar)
- Janet Yellen (U.S. Secretary of the Treasury 2021– under Biden, Fed chair 2014–2018)
- Glenn Youngkin (74th governor of Virginia 2022–, Carlyle Group 1995–2020, Carlyle co-CEO 2018–2020, McKinsey 1994–1995)
- Janine Zacharia (journalist at The Jerusalem Post, Bloomberg News and The Washington Post and lecturer in journalism at Stanford University)
- Paula Zahn (journalist, former anchor at Fox News and CNN)
- Fareed Zakaria (journalist at CNN and The Washington Post)
- Dov S. Zakheim (academic and Under Secretary of Defense (Comptroller) 2001–2004 under George W. Bush, Atlantic Council board)
- Philip D. Zelikow (9/11 Commission executive director and chair, Aspen Strategy Group)
- Jeffrey D. Zients ("Covid Czar" under Biden)
- Robert J. Zimmer (University of Chicago president 2006– )
- Robert B. Zoellick (president of the World Bank 2007–2012, Aspen Strategy Group)
- James Zogby (academic, political commentator and pollster)
- Mortimer B. Zuckerman (Canadian-born publisher/editor-in-chief of U.S. News & World Report, formerly owned New York Daily News, The Atlantic and Fast Company)

=== Current emeritus and honorary officers and directors ===
- Madeleine K. Albright (director emerita)
- Leslie H. Gelb (president emeritus)
- Maurice R. Greenberg (honorary vice chairman)
- Peter G. Peterson (chairman emeritus)
- David Rockefeller (honorary chairman)

== Notable historical members ==
- Morton I. Abramowitz (diplomat, former president of the Carnegie Endowment)
- Peter Ackerman (founder, International Center on Nonviolent Conflict)
- Herbert Agar (writer, editor of The Louisville Courier-Journal)
- Harold Agnew (physicist, director of Los Alamos National Laboratory)
- Umberto Agnelli (Italian industrialist, CEO of Fiat)
- Roger Ailes (former chairman and CEO of Fox News)
- Fouad Ajami (professor in Middle East Studies, Johns Hopkins University)
- John B. Anderson (former GOP and Independent U.S. congressman from Illinois, independent candidate in 1980 U.S. presidential election)
- Les Aspin (Democratic U.S. congressman from Wisconsin, 18th U.S. Secretary of Defense under Clinton, Rhodes scholar)
- Kenneth Bacon (journalist)
- Howard Baker (13th Senate Majority Leader as a GOP U.S. senator from Tennessee, 12th White House Chief of Staff under Ronald Reagan, husband of Nancy Kassebaum Baker)
- George Wildman Ball (diplomat)
- Sandy Berger (19th U.S. National Security Adviser under Clinton)
- Joe Biden (46th POTUS 2021–2025, 47th VPOTUS 2009–2017, Democratic U.S. senator from Delaware 1973–2009)
- Jonathan Bingham (Democratic U.S. congressman from New York, diplomat)
- Conrad Black, The Rt Hon Lord Black of Crossharbour, KCSG (Canadian-born British former newspaper publisher, International Advisory Board member)
- Shirley Temple Black (child star, U.S. Ambassador to Czechoslovakia 1989–1992, U.S. Ambassador to Ghana 1974–1976, wife of Charles Alden Black of Stanford Research Institute)
- Lincoln P. Bloomfield (U.S. State Department official and foreign policy expert)
- David Boren (former Democratic U.S. senator from Oklahoma and president of the University of Oklahoma)
- Rudy Boschwitz (former GOP U.S. senator from Minnesota)
- Robert R. Bowie (Foreign Policy Association, Director of Policy Planning 1953–1957; co-founder with Henry Kissinger of Harvard Center for International Affairs 1958, Counselor of the State Department 1966–1968, CIA Chief National Intelligence Officer 1977–1979, Trilateral Commission)
- Tom Braden (former CIA agent and liberal journalist on CNN)
- Spruille Braden (diplomat, businessman)
- Sir Richard Branson (Virgin Group head, The Bail Project partner)
- Bill Brock (chairman of the Republican Party 1977–1981, U.S. Trade Representative 1981–1985, U.S. Secretary of Labor under Reagan 1985–1987, GOP U.S. senator from Tennessee 1971–1977 succeeding Al Gore Sr.)
- Edgar Bronfman Sr. (Canadian-born Seagram heir, president 1979–2007 of the World Jewish Congress)
- Arthur Bronwell (president of Worcester Polytechnic Institute 1955–1962, dean of the University of Connecticut School of Engineering 1962–1970)
- Zbigniew Brzezinski (U.S. National Security Advisor 1977–1981 under Carter, academic at Columbia, organizer of The Trilateral Commission in 1973, father of Mika Brzezinski)
- William F. Buckley, Jr (commentator, publisher, founder of the National Review)
- McGeorge Bundy (National Security Advisor for Presidents JFK and LBJ)
- William Bundy (CIA officer, historian)
- George H. W. Bush (41st POTUS 1989–1993, 43rd VPOTUS 1981–1989, former Director of the CIA 1976–1977, Chief Liaison in Beijing 1974–1975 under Ford, UN Ambassador 1971–1973 under Nixon)
- Frank Carlucci (16th U.S. Secretary of Defense and 15th National Security Advisor under Reagan, 13th Deputy Director of the CIA under Carter)
- Dick Celeste President of Colorado College 2002-2011, 64th Governor of Ohio 1983-1991, Director of Peace Corps 1979-1981
- John Chafee (60th U.S. Secretary of the Navy under Nixon, and GOP U.S. senator from Rhode Island)
- Dick Cheney (46th VPOTUS 2001–2009, White House chief of staff under Ford 1975–1977 succeeding Donald Rumsfeld, husband of Lynne Cheney, father of Mary and Liz Cheney)
- Warren Christopher (63rd U.S. Secretary of State 1993–1997 under Clinton)
- Hillary Clinton (ex-FLOTUS 1993–2001, Democratic U.S. senator from New York 2001–2009, 67th U.S. Secretary of State 2009–2013 under Obama)
- Stephen F. Cohen (professor of Russian studies at NYU, husband of Katrina vanden Heuvel)
- Paul Cravath (lawyer, one of the founders of the CFR)
- Monica Crowley (former Richard Nixon aide, radio host, and columnist)
- Heidi Cruz (spouse of U.S. senator Ted Cruz, former director of the Latin America Office at the U.S. Treasury Department and managing director at Goldman Sachs)
- Mario Cuomo (Democratic politician, 52nd governor of New York 1983–1994, father of Andrew and Chris Cuomo)
- Kathryn Wasserman Davis (philanthropist)
- Thomas E. Dewey (47th governor of New York 1943–1954, GOP nominee for the Presidency in 1944 and 1948)
- C. Douglas Dillon (57th U.S. Treasury Secretary under JFK and LBJ, Under Secretary of State under Eisenhower)
- Michael Dukakis (65th and 67th governor of Massachusetts, Democratic presidential nominee for the 1988 election)
- Allen Welsh Dulles (CFR president 1946–1950, Director of Central Intelligence 1953–1961 under Eisenhower and JFK)
- John Foster Dulles (52nd U.S. Secretary of State 1953–1959 under Eisenhower, GOP U.S. senator from New York 1949, drafter of UN Charter preamble, older brother of Allen Dulles)
- Fred Dutton (lawyer, lobbyist, Democratic operative)
- Michael Raoul Duval (attorney for Richard Nixon & Gerald Ford)
- Paul A. Dyster (30th mayor of Niagara Falls, New York)
- Lawrence Eagleburger (62nd U.S. Secretary of State under George H. W. Bush)
- Jeffrey E. Epstein (convicted sex offender and financier)
- Rowland Evans (journalist)
- John Exter (economist)
- Noah Feldman (Harvard Law professor clerked for fellow Rhodes scholar David Souter at U.S. Supreme Court)
- Geraldine Ferraro (former Democratic U.S. congresswoman from New York, first woman on a major party presidential ticket in 1984 election)
- Gerald Ford (38th POTUS 1974–1977, Warren Commission member)
- Edwin Francis Gay (co-founder of the CFR and its first secretary and treasurer, 1921–1933; first dean of Harvard Business School)
- Leslie H. Gelb (former New York Times columnist, national security correspondent, editor of the op-ed page, former CFR president 1993–2003, president emeritus 2003–2019)
- Richard L. Gelb (CFR board 1979–1988, former chairman and CEO of Bristol Myers Squibb, N.Y. Fed board, The New York Times Company board, brother of Bruce Gelb, son of Lawrence M. Gelb)
- Murray Gell-Mann (co-founder of Santa Fe Institute)
- Newt Gingrich (58th Speaker of the House 1995–1999 as a GOP U.S. congressman from Georgia)
- Ruth Bader Ginsburg (U.S. Supreme Court Justice 1993–2020)
- Mikhail Gorbachev (former president of the USSR)
- Karenna Gore (daughter of Al Gore Jr., ex-wife of Jacob Schiff's great-great-grandson)
- Alexander Haig (U.S. Army general, 59th U.S. Secretary of State under Reagan)
- Sidney Harman (businessman, owner of Newsweek)
- Armand Hammer (business associate of V. I. Lenin and Al Gore Sr., and namesake of UWC whose ex-presidents include King Charles)
- W. Averell Harriman (48th governor of New York, diplomat, 11th U.S. Secretary of Commerce under Truman)
- H. John Heinz III (former GOP U.S. senator from Pennsylvania 1977–1991, first husband of Teresa Heinz Kerry)
- Frederick Samuel "Fred" Hiatt (Washington Post editorial page editor overseeing opinions page 2000–, son of Howard Hiatt)
- Richard Holbrooke (diplomat, investment banker, 22nd UN Ambassador under Clinton)
- Herbert Hoover (31st POTUS 1929–1933, appointed Eugene Meyer as Fed chair 1930–1933)
- Henry Hyde (former GOP U.S. congressman from Illinois)
- Robert Kagan (historian, Washington Post columnist, co-founder of PNAC, husband of Victoria Nuland, brother of Frederick Kagan, son of Donald Kagan)
- Sergei Karaganov (International Advisory Board member)
- Charles Krauthammer (columnist for The Washington Post and political commentator at Fox News)
- Irving Kristol (journalist, writer, "Godfather of Neoconservatism", father of Bill Kristol)
- Jack Kemp (Buffalo Bills ex-quarterback, former GOP U.S. congressman from New York, 9th HUD Secretary under George H. W. Bush, GOP vice presidential nominee for 1996 election)
- George Kennan (diplomat, historian)
- Jeane Kirkpatrick (diplomat, 16th UN Ambassador under Reagan)
- Henry Kissinger, KCMG (National Security Advisor 1969–1975 under Nixon, U.S. Secretary of State 1973–1977 under Nixon and Ford, 1st Chair of the 9/11 Commission Nov.–Dec. 2002, author of NSS Memo 200, subject of The Trials of Henry Kissinger,Trilateral Commission member, mentor of Klaus Schwab)
- Winston Lord (U.S. Ambassador to China 1985–1989, ex-president of CFR 1977–1985, drafter of 1972 Shanghai Communiqué, Kissinger associate)
- Ivy Lee ("father of public relations")
- Robert A. Lovett (4th U.S. Secretary of Defense under Truman)
- Robert Matsui (former Democratic U.S. congressman from California)
- John McCain (GOP U.S. senator from Arizona 1987–2018, GOP presidential nominee for the 2008 election)
- John J. McCloy (preceded David Rockefeller as chairman of the CFR 1954–1969, succeeded Eugene Meyer as 2nd World Bank President, Warren Commission member)
- Charles Peter McColough (businessman)
- George McGovern (former Democratic U.S. senator from South Dakota, Democratic presidential nominee for the 1972 election)
- Robert McNamara (8th Secretary of Defense under JFK and LBJ, 5th president of the World Bank)
- Bill Moyers (White House press secretary under LBJ, public commentator for PBS)
- Daniel Patrick Moynihan (diplomat, former Democratic U.S. senator from New York 1977–2001)
- Edmund Muskie (58th U.S. Secretary of State under Carter, U.S. senator from Maine, 64th governor of Maine, Democratic vice presidential candidate for the 1968 election)
- Reena Ninan (national mainstream media journalist, owner of Good Trouble Productions)
- Richard M. Nixon (37th POTUS 1969–1974, VPOTUS 1953–1961, GOP U.S. senator from California 1950–1953)
- Paul Nitze (Secretary of the Navy under LBJ)
- Sandra Day O'Connor (U.S. Supreme Court justice 1981–2006)
- Kevin Peraino (husband of Reena Ninan, former Newsweek reporter and author)
- Peter G. Peterson (Blackstone Group co-founder and CEO, Lehman Brothers CEO 1973–1984, CFR president 1985–2007)
- Richard Pipes (academic, father of founder and director of Middle East Forum Daniel Pipes)
- Colin Powell KCB (U.S. Secretary of State 2001–2005 under George W. Bush, U.S. National Security Advisor 1987–1989 under Reagan, chairman of the Joint Chiefs of Staff 1989–1993 under George H. W. Bush)
- Priscilla Presley (actress and former chairwoman of the board of Elvis Presley Enterprises)
- Charles Rangel (Democratic U.S. congressman from NYC 1971–2017)
- Abraham A. Ribicoff (former Democratic U.S. senator from Connecticut)
- David Rockefeller (chairman of the CFR 1970–1985, chairman and CEO of Chase Manhattan Bank 1969–1981)
- Nelson Rockefeller (41st VPOTUS 1974–1977 under Ford, 49th governor of New York 1959–1973)
- John D. Rockefeller III (founder of Population Council, brother of Abby, Nelson, Winthrop, Laurance and David Rockefeller)
- Felix Rohatyn (investment banker with Lazard, U.S. Ambassador to France under Clinton)
- Mark B. Rosenberg (president of Florida International University)
- Eugene Rostow (former dean of Yale Law School, legal scholar)
- Walt Rostow (7th National Security Advisor under LBJ)
- William V. Roth, Jr. (former GOP U.S. senator from Delaware)
- Dean Rusk (54th U.S. Secretary of State under JFK and LBJ)
- Carl Sagan (scientist)
- Arthur Schlesinger (historian, academic)
- Brent Scowcroft (U.S. National Security Advisor 1975–1977 and 1989–1993 under Presidents Ford and George H. W. Bush, Aspen Strategy Group founding co-chair 1984)
- Raymond P. Shafer (former GOP governor of Pennsylvania)
- George Shultz (U.S. Secretary of State 1982–1989 under Reagan, U.S. Secretary of the Treasury 1972–1974 and U.S. Labor Secretary 1969–1970 under Nixon)
- Ron Silver (actor, director, producer, co-founded One Jerusalem, played Alan Dershowitz in Reversal of Fortune, played Henry Kissinger in Kissinger and Nixon)
- Tony Snow (former press secretary under George W. Bush, journalist, radio talk-show host)
- Strobe Talbott (diplomat, chairman of Brookings Institution, journalist)
- Richard Thornburgh (76th U.S. Attorney General under Reagan and George H. W. Bush, 76th governor of Pennsylvania)
- Stansfield Turner (U.S. Navy admiral, 12th director of the CIA under Carter, Rhodes scholar)
- Sanford J. Ungar (president emeritus of Goucher College, All Things Considered host 1980–1982)
- Cyrus Vance (U.S. Secretary of State 1977–1980 under Carter, and father of Cyrus Vance Jr.)
- Paul Volcker (chairman of the Federal Reserve 1979–1987)
- Barbara Walters (TV journalist)
- Vernon A. Walters (U.S. Army general, 17th UN Ambassador under Reagan and George H. W. Bush)
- James Warburg (son of Paul Warburg, nephew of Jacob Schiff, promoter of Morgenthau Plan and "world government")
- Paul Warburg (banker, co-founder of Federal Reserve, CFR board member 1921–1932)
- Rick Warren (Christian leader, senior pastor of the Saddleback Church)
- Andrew C. Weber (former Assistant Secretary of Defense for Nuclear, Chemical & Biological Defense Programs)
- Caspar Weinberger (15th U.S. Secretary of Defense under Reagan)
- John Wheeler III (Vietnam veteran, military consultant, presidential aide, chairman of the Vietnam Veterans Memorial Fund)
- John C. Whitehead (9th U.S. Deputy Secretary of State under Reagan, chairman of the WTC Memorial Foundation, former Goldman Sachs chairman)
- Albert Wohlstetter (RAND Corporation analyst)
- Roberta Wohlstetter (RAND Corporation analyst)
- Tadataka "Tachi" Yamada, KBE (ex-partner of Frazier Healthcare Partners)

=== List of chairs ===
- Russell Cornell Leffingwell, 1946–1953
- John J. McCloy, 1953–1970
- David Rockefeller, 1970–1985
- Peter G. Peterson, 1985–2007
- Carla A. Hills, 2007–2017 (co-chair)
- Robert E. Rubin, 2007–2017 (co-chair)
- David Rubenstein, 2017–present

=== List of presidents ===
- John W. Davis, 1921–1933
- George W. Wickersham, 1933–1936
- Norman H. Davis, 1936–1944
- Russell Cornell Leffingwell, 1944–1946
- Allen Welsh Dulles, 1946–1950
- Henry Merritt Wriston, 1951–1964
- Grayson L. Kirk, 1964–1971
- Bayless Manning, 1971–1977
- Winston Lord, 1977–1985
- John Temple Swing, 1985–1986 (pro tempore)
- Peter Tarnoff, 1986–1993
- Alton Frye, 1993
- Leslie H. Gelb, 1993–2003
- Richard N. Haass, 2003–2023
- Michael Froman, 2023–present
