= Trilateral Commission =

International political and economic discussion group

The Trilateral Commission
- Founded: 1973
- Founders: David Rockefeller; Zbigniew Brzezinski
- Type: Annual conference
- Headquarters: Tokyo (Asia Pacific Group); Paris (European Group); Washington, D.C. (North American Group)
- Members: More than 390
- Chairman: Takeshi Niinami (Asia Pacific chairman); Jean-Claude Trichet (European chairman); Meghan O'Sullivan (North American chairman)
- Website: www.trilateral.org

The Trilateral Commission is a nongovernmental international organization aimed at fostering closer cooperation between Japan, Western Europe and North America. It was founded in July 1973, principally by the American banker and philanthropist David Rockefeller, an internationalist who sought to address the challenges posed by the growing economic and political interdependence between the U.S. and its allies in North America, Western Europe, and Japan. The leadership of the organization has since focused on returning to "our roots as a group of countries sharing common values and a commitment to the rule of law, open economies and societies, and democratic principles".

The Trilateral Commission is headed by an executive committee and three regional chairs representing Europe, North America, and the Asia-Pacific region, with headquarters in Paris, Washington, D.C., and Tokyo, respectively. Meetings are held annually at locations that rotate among the three regions; regional and national meetings are held throughout the year. Most gatherings focus on discussing reports and debating strategy to meet the commission's aims.

The Trilateral Commission represents influential commercial and political interests. As of 2021, there were roughly 400 members, including leading figures in politics, business, media, and academia. Each country within the three regions is assigned a quota of members reflecting its relative political and economic strength.

== History ==
=== Founding ===
The Trilateral Commission was formed in 1973 by private citizens of Japan, North American nations (the U.S. and Canada), and Western European nations to foster substantive political and economic dialogue across the world. The idea of the commission was developed in the early 1970s, a time of considerable discord among the United States and its allies in Western Europe, Japan, and Canada. To quote its founding declaration:

- "Growing interdependence is a fact of life of the contemporary world. It transcends and influences national systems... While it is important to develop greater cooperation among all the countries of the world, Japan, Western Europe, and North America, in view of their great weight in the world economy and their massive relations with one another, bear a special responsibility for developing effective cooperation, both in their own interests and in those of the rest of the world."
- "To be effective in meeting common problems, Japan, Western Europe, and North America will have to consult and cooperate more closely, on the basis of equality, to develop and carry out coordinated policies on matters affecting their common interests... refrain from unilateral actions incompatible with their interdependence and from actions detrimental to other regions... [and] take advantage of existing international and regional organizations and further enhance their role."
- "The Commission hopes to play a creative role as a channel of free exchange of opinions with other countries and regions. Further progress of the developing countries and greater improvement of East-West relations will be a major concern."

Zbigniew Brzezinski, a Rockefeller advisor who was a specialist on international affairs (and later President Jimmy Carter's National Security Advisor from 1977 to 1981), left Columbia University to organize the group, along with:

- Edwin Reischauer, professor at Harvard University and United States Ambassador to Japan, 1961–1966
- George S. Franklin, executive director of the Council on Foreign Relations 1953–1971
- Gerard C. Smith, SALT I negotiator and its first North American chairman
- Henry D. Owen, foreign policy studies director at the Brookings Institution
- Max Kohnstamm, European Policy Centre
- Robert R. Bowie, the Foreign Policy Association and director of the Harvard Center for International Affairs
- Marshall Hornblower, former partner at Wilmer, Cutler & Pickering
- Tadashi Yamamoto, Japan Center for International Exchange
- William Scranton, former governor of Pennsylvania

The organization's records are stored at the Rockefeller Archive Center in Sleepy Hollow, New York.

== Meetings ==
The Trilateral Commission initiated its biannual meetings in October 1973 in Tokyo, Japan. In May 1976 the first plenary meeting of all of the commission's regional groups took place in Kyoto, Japan. Since the ninth meeting in 1978, plenary meetings have taken place annually. Besides annual plenary meetings, regional meetings have also taken place in each of the Asia Pacific Group, the European Group and the North American Group. Since its founding, the discussion group has produced an official journal, Trialogue.

== Membership ==
Membership is divided into numbers proportionate to each of the think tank's three regional areas. North America is represented by 120 members: 20 Canadian, 13 Mexican and 87 American. The European group has reached its limit of 170 members from almost every country on the continent; the ceilings for individual countries are 20 for Germany, 18 for France, Italy and the United Kingdom, 12 for Spain and 1–6 for the rest. At first Asia and Oceania were represented only by Japan, but in 2000 the Japanese group of 85 members became the Pacific Asia group, comprising 117 members: 75 Japanese, 11 South Koreans, seven Australian and New Zealand citizens, and 15 members from the ASEAN nations (Indonesia, Malaysia, Philippines, Singapore and Thailand). The Pacific Asia group also included 9 members from China, Hong Kong and Taiwan. The commission now claims "more than 100" Pacific Asian members.

The Trilateral Commission's bylaws apparently deny membership to public officials. It draws its members from politics, business, and academia, and has three chairpersons, one from each region. The current chairs are former U.S. Assistant Secretary of Defense for International Security Affairs Joseph S. Nye, Jr., former head of the European Central Bank Jean-Claude Trichet, and Yasuchika Hasegawa, chair of Takeda Pharmaceutical Company.

=== Leadership ===
As of September 2021

Name	Position
Jean-Claude Trichet	European Chairman
Meghan O'Sullivan	North American Chairman
Akihiko Tanaka	Asia Pacific Chairman
Alexandra Papalexopoulou	European Deputy Chairman
Herminio Blanco Mendoza	North American Deputy Chairman
Barry Desker	Asia Pacific Deputy Chairman
Carl Bildt	European Deputy Chairman
Jeffrey Simpson	North American Deputy Chairman
Jin Roy Ryu	Asia Pacific Deputy Chairman
David Rockefeller (deceased)	Founder
Peter Sutherland (deceased)	Honorary European Chairman
Georges Berthoin (deceased)	European Honorary Chairman
Paul Volcker (deceased)	North American Honorary Chairman
Yasuchika Hasegawa	Asia Pacific Honorary Chairman
Paolo Magri	European Director
Richard Fontaine	North American Director
Hideko Katsumata	Asia Pacific Director

=== Notable members ===
- Graham Allison, Director of the Belfer Center for Science and International Affairs and Dean of the Harvard Kennedy School
- Alyssa Ayres, Dean of the Elliott School of International Affairs, George Washington University
- Catherine Bertini, Professor, Maxwell School of Citizenship and Public Affairs
- Antony Blinken, U.S. Secretary of State 2021–2025, son of Donald Mayer Blinken, stepson of Samuel Pisar
- Michael R. Bloomberg, founder/CEO of Bloomberg L.P., mayor of New York City 2002–2013, namesake of largest U.S. school of public health at Johns Hopkins
- Sophie Boissard, Chief Executive Officer, Korian
- Robert R. Bowie, Director of Policy Planning 1953–1957, Foreign Policy Association, co-founder with Henry Kissinger of Harvard Center for International Affairs 1958, Counselor of the State Department 1966–1968, CFR, CIA Chief National Intelligence Officer 1977–1979
- Lael Brainard, Chairman of the U.S. National Economic Council; member of U.S. Federal Reserve's Board of Governors; former Under Secretary U.S. Treasury
- Ian Bremmer, president of Eurasia Group and GZERO Media
- Nicola Brewer, British diplomat, British High Commissioner to South Africa, DCMG
- Esther Brimmer, executive director/CEO of NAFSA: Association of International Educators, Atlantic Council board; former Assistant Secretary of State for International Organization Affairs
- Mark Brzezinski, president and CEO of Brzezinski Strategies LLC, son of Zbigniew Brzezinski, and U.S. Ambassador to Sweden 2011–2015
- Zbigniew Brzezinski, U.S. National Security Advisor in Carter administration
- Steve Bunnell, partner in O'Melveny & Myers LLP, former General Counsel at DHS
- R. Nicholas Burns, U.S. Ambassador to China since 2021, professor and board member of the Belfer Center for Science and International Affairs at Harvard Kennedy School, director of the Aspen Strategy Group, senior counselor at The Cohen Group, board member of Entegris Inc., CFR member, the Rockefeller Brothers Fund, Fulbright scholar at Queen Mary University of London 2020, vice chair of the American Ditchley Foundation, senior advisor at Chatham House, Under Secretary of State for Political Affairs 2005–2008, Atlantic Council board
- George H. W. Bush, President of the United States 1989–1993, Vice President of the United States 1981-1989
- Richard Cannings (British Columbia politician) Canadian Member of Parliament
- Ash Carter, director of the Belfer Center for Science and International Affairs at Harvard Kennedy School, U.S. Secretary of Defense 2015–2017, CFR board, Aspen Strategy Group, Atlantic Council honorary director
- Jimmy Carter, President of the United States 1977–1981
- Jean Charest, partner in McCarthy Tétrault LLP, former Premier of Québec, member of the Queen's Privy Council for Canada
- Michael Chertoff, chairman/co-founder of The Chertoff Group, Secretary of Homeland Security 2005–2009, judge on the U.S. Court of Appeals for the 3rd Circuit 2001–2003, Assistant Attorney General for the DoJ Criminal Division 2003–2005, Atlantic Council board
- Raymond Chrétien, strategic adviser at Fasken, former chair of the Montréal Council on Foreign Relations, former Associate Under Secretary of State of External Affairs, former Canadian Ambassador to the Congo, Belgium, Mexico, the United States, and France, nephew of Jean Chrétien
- Heidi Crebo-Rediker, former Chief Economist, U.S. Department of State and Assistant Secretary of State; Senior Fellow, Council on Foreign Relations
- Helima Croft, Managing Director, RBC Capital Markets
- Lee Cullum, Journalist, PBS
- Caroline Daniel, British journalist, Financial Times
- John M. Deutch, Director of CIA 1995–1996, Aspen Strategy Group)
- Paula Dobriansky, Senior Fellow, Harvard Belfer Center; former U.S. Under Secretary of State for Global Affairs
- Wendy Dobson, Professor Emerita, Rotman School of Management, University of Toronto
- Hedley Donovan, former editor-in-chief of Time
- Nina Easton, Co-CEO, SellerEaston, former Washington Editor of Fortune
- Bülent Eczacıbaşı, Turkish businessman, Chairman of Eczacıbaşı Holding
- Jeffrey Epstein, former hedge fund manager convicted of sex trafficking in 2008, described as "an enthusiastic member of the Trilateral Commission" in 2002
- Dawn Farrell, president and CEO, TransAlta Corporation
- Diana Farrell, former CEO and President, JP Morgan Institute, former Head of McKinsey Global Institute, former Deputy Director, U.S. National Economic Council
- Laurence "Larry" Fink, CFR board member, BlackRock CEO since 1988, WEF trustee
- George S. Franklin, executive director of the Council on Foreign Relations 1953–1971
- Richard Gardner, Columbia law professor, U.S. Ambassador to Spain 1993–1997, U.S. Ambassador to Italy 1977–1981
- David Gergen, Harvard Kennedy School professor, adviser to Nixon, Ford, Reagan, Clinton, commentator for CNN
- Jamie S. Gorelick, partner at WilmerHale, U.S. Deputy Attorney General 1994–1997, General Counsel of DoD 1993–1994, defended BP after 2010 oil spill, 9/11 Commission member, Amazon board member
- Donald E. Graham, Graham Holdings chair since 2013, Washington Post publisher 1979–2000, Pulitzer Prize board 1999–2008, Facebook board 2009–2015, Bilderberg meeting attendee in 2009 and 2010
- Kelly Grier, former U.S. Chair and Managing Partner, EY
- Jane Harman, former Member, U.S. House of Representatives; President Emerita, Wilson Center
- Linda Hasenfratz, CEO, Linamar Corporation
- Anniken Hauglie, former Director General, Norwegian Oil and Gas Association, former Minister of Labour and Social Affairs, Norway
- Kerry Healey, President of the Milken Center for Advancing the American Dream; former Lieutenant Governor of Massachusetts
- Marillyn A. Hewson, Former Chairman, President and Chief Executive Officer, Lockheed Martin Corporation
- Fiona Hill, The Globalist writer, former Senior Director for Europe and Russia of the NSC
- Carla Anderson Hills, CFR co-chair 2007–2017, U.S. HUD Secretary 1975–1977, U.S. Trade Representative 1989–1993
- Melody Hobson, Co-CEO and President, Ariel Investments
- Gerda Holzinger-Burgstaller, Chief Executive Officer, Erste Bank, Austria
- Karen Elliott House, Former Publisher, The Wall Street Journal; former Senior Vice President, Dow Jones & Company.
- Christopher B. Howard, Robert Morris University president since 2016, CFR, Rhodes scholar, Harvard Board of Overseers, Aspen Strategy Group
- Vivian Hunt, British businesswoman and Managing Partner at McKinsey, London
- Samuel P. Huntington, former director of Harvard’s Center for International Affairs, former White House Coordinator of Security Planning for the U.S. National Security Council
- David Ignatius, Washington Post journalist, Body of Lies author, Aspen Strategy Group
- Ken Juster, U.S. Ambassador to India
- Juliette Kayyem, Lecturer in Public Policy, JFK School of Government, Harvard University; former Assistant Secretary, U.S. Department of Homeland Security
- John Kingman, British businessman and chairman at Legal & General
- Henry Kissinger KCMG, National Security Adviser 1969–1975, U.S. Secretary of State 1973–1977, first chair of the 9/11 Commission Nov.–Dec. 2002, author of NSS Memo 200, Bilderberg attendee, subject of The Trials of Henry Kissinger, mentor of Klaus Schwab, Atlantic Council board
- Max Kohnstamm, European Policy Centre
- Jovan Kovacic, East West Bridge founder and president
- Nicholas D. Kristof, New York Times columnist, Aspen Strategy Group member, Rhodes scholar
- Stephanie Kusie, Canadian Member of Parliament
- Monique Leroux, Former Chair of the Board and CEO, Desjardins Group
- Tove Lifvendahl, political editor-in-chief of Svenska Dagbladet
- Cecilia Malmstrom, former European Commissioner for Trade, European Commission
- Heather McPherson, Canadian Member of Parliament
- Judith A. "Jami" Miscik, CFR vice chair, CIA Deputy Director for Intelligence 2002–2005, Global Head of Sovereign Risk at Lehman Brothers 2005–2008, PIAB chair 2014–2017, president/vice-chair of Kissinger Associates since 2009
- Andrea Mitchell, Chief Foreign Affairs & Chief Washington Correspondent NBC News, Anchor Andrea Mitchell Reports, MSNBC; spouse of Alan Greenspan
- Susan Molinari, former Member, U.S. House of Representatives
- Walter Mondale, VPOTUS 1977–1981, candidate in 1984 presidential election
- Mario Monti, prime minister of Italy 2011–2013
- Heather Munroe-Blum, Chair, Canada Pension Plan Investment Board
- John Negroponte, U.S. Deputy Secretary of State 2007–2009, UN Ambassador 2001–2004, first Director of National Intelligence 2005–2007, subject of The Ambassador, brother of MIT Media Lab founder Nicholas Negroponte
- Michelle Nunn, President and CEO, CARE
- Joseph Nye, former U.S. Assistant Secretary of Defense for International Security Affairs, Atlantic Council board
- Claudia Olsson, founder and chair, Stellar Capacity
- Meghan O'Sullivan, Trilateral Commission North American chair, CFR board, Aspen Strategy Group
- Henry D. Owen, foreign policy studies director at the Brookings Institution
- Stephen Peel, British private equity investor
- Martin J. Munsch III, U.S. United Nations Deputy Communications Pakistan Mission Relations 2003-2010 under Bush, Clinton 2003 - 2010
- Edwin Reischauer, Harvard professor and U.S. Ambassador to Japan, 1961–1966
- Ginni Rometty, former president and CEO of IBM
- David Rubenstein, CFR chair, Carlyle Group founder, namesake of HKS building, WEF trustee, Aspen Strategy Group
- Güler Sabancı, Turkish businesswoman, chair of Sabancı Holding
- Indira Samarasekera, Bennett Jones, former president and former vice-chancellor of the University of Alberta
- David E. Sanger, New York Times White House correspondent, Aspen Strategy Group
- Eric E. Schmidt, ex-CEO of Google, Bilderberg attendee
- Susan C. Schwab, Former U.S. Trade Representative
- William Scranton, former governor of Pennsylvania
- Kristen Silverberg, President and COO, Business Roundtable; former U.S. Ambassador to the European Union
- Gerard C. Smith, lead SALT 1 negotiator
- Rajiv Shah, Rockefeller Foundation president, Atlantic Council board
- Wendy Sherman, U.S. Deputy Secretary of State since 2021; former professor of the practice of public leadership and director of the Center for Public Leadership at the Harvard Kennedy School; former Under Secretary of State for Political Affairs, U.S. Department of State
- Olympia Snowe, U.S. senator from Maine 1995–2013
- Keir Starmer, British Prime Minister and leader of the Labour Party
- James B. Steinberg, U.S. Deputy Secretary of State 2009–2011 under Obama, Deputy National Security Advisor 1997–2001 under Clinton, CFR member, Aspen Strategy Group, Bilderberg attendee
- Jake Sullivan, U.S. National Security Advisor since 2021
- Carole Taylor, former Chair CBC/Radio Canada, former Chair, Canadian Ports
- Frances Townsend, Homeland Security Advisor 2004–2008, CFR board, Aspen Strategy Group, Atlantic Council board
- Philip H. Trezise, Center for Law and Social Policy
- Levent Tuzun, Turkish economist, Principal Economist at the European Bank for Reconstruction and Development (EBRD)
- Cyrus Vance Sr., U.S. Secretary of State 1977–1980
- Jacob Wallenberg, Bilderberg attendee, "prince in Sweden's royal family of finance"
- Marcus "Husky" Wallenberg, Swedish banker formerly at Citibank, Deutsche Bank, S. G. Warburg & Co., Citicorp and the SEB Group
- Paul C. Warnke, Center for Law and Social Policy, Clifford, Warnke, Glass, McIlwain & Finney
- David Willetts, British Conservative Party peerage
- Tadashi Yamamoto, Japan Center for International Exchange
- Charles W. Yost, U.S. Ambassador to Syria, Morocco, the United Nations, CFR member, Cochair Americans for Salt II, President, National Committee on US-China Relations, Coordinator, Aspen Institute East-West, Iran and China Activities
- Robert Zoellick, World Bank president 2007–2012, CFR member, Bilderberg attendee
- Nigel Higgins, Chairman of Barclays Bank

== Assessments ==
Social critic and academic Noam Chomsky has criticized the commission as undemocratic, pointing to its key publication The Crisis of Democracy, which describes the strong popular interest in politics during the 1970s as an "excess of democracy". He has cited it as one of the most interesting and insightful books showing the modern democratic system not to really be a democracy at all, but controlled by elites who seek to keep the general public disengaged from genuine democratic participation by subtle and mostly non-violent methods and to redefine democracy itself in operative terms that enshrine their own interests as a tiny privileged minority. Chomsky adds that as it was an internal discussion, they felt free to "let their hair down" and to talk openly about the need for an increasingly active and defiant public to be reduced back to its proper state of apathy and obedience lest it continue to use democratic means to deprive them of their power.

Critics accuse the Commission of promoting a global consensus among the international ruling classes in order to manage international affairs in the interest of the financial and industrial elites under the Trilateral umbrella.

In his 1980 book With No Apologies, Republican Senator Barry Goldwater suggested that the discussion group was "a skillful, coordinated effort to seize control and consolidate the four centers of power: political, monetary, intellectual, and ecclesiastical ... [in] the creation of a worldwide economic power superior to the political governments of the nation-states involved".

== Conspiracy theories involving the Trilateral Commission ==
Some conspiracy theorists believe the organization to be a central plotter of a world government or synarchy. In his book Among the Truthers: A Journey Through America's Growing Conspiracist Underground, Jonathan Kay wrote that Luke Rudkowski interrupted a lecture by former Trilateral Commission director Zbigniew Brzezinski in April 2007 and accused the organization and a few others of having orchestrated the 9/11 attacks to initiate a new world order.

Economist Anthony C. Sutton was critical of the Trilateral Commission's goals and methods, characterizing them as a "rich man's club". Yet he also wrote: "The Trilateral Commission is not a conspiracy. Its membership list is completely public – it costs a postage stamp to get one" and characterized the group as "completely above ground" in promoting their agenda. Furthermore, Sutton noted he had debated a high-ranking member of the group on a radio broadcast and concluded: "Conspirators just don't appear on radio talk shows to debate their objectives."

Neo-conservative pundit Charles Krauthammer mockingly alluded to the conspiracy theories about the commission when he was asked in 2012 who makes up the "Republican establishment", saying: "Karl Rove is the president. We meet every month on the full moon ... [at] the Masonic Temple. We have the ritual: Karl brings the incense, I bring the live lamb and the long knife, and we began... with a pledge of allegiance to the Trilateral Commission."

== Publications ==
Books

- Crozier, Michel; Huntington, Samuel; Watanuki, Joji (1975). The Crisis of Democracy: Report on the Governability of Democracies to the Trilateral Commission. New York: New York University Press. ISBN 0-8147-1365-3.
- The Global Economic Crisis. Washington, D.C.: Brookings Institution. 2011. ISBN 978-0-930503-93-2.
- Nuclear Disarmament and Nonproliferation. Washington, D.C.: Brookings Institution. 2011. ISBN 978-0-930503-94-9.

== See also ==
- Bilderberg Group
- World Economic Forum
- Bohemian Grove
- Samuel Huntington (author of The Crisis of Democracy)
- Valdai Discussion Club
- Internationalism
