= Richard Kogan =

Richard Kogan may refer to:

- Richard Kogan (businessman) (born 1941), former president and chief executive officer of Schering-Plough
- Richard Kogan (physician) (born 1955), professor of psychiatry and concert pianist
- Richard Kogan (commentator), researcher and policy analyst, see Budget and Accounting Transparency Act of 2014
- Rick Kogan, Chicago newspaperman, radio personality and author
