= Stephen Biddle =

American writer and academic

- Born: January 19, 1959 (age 67); Wilmington, Delaware
- Education: Harvard University
- Occupations: Professor, author, historian, columnist, pundit, policy scholar
- Organization: School of International and Public Affairs, Columbia University

Stephen D. Biddle (born January 19, 1959) is an American author, military historian, policy analyst and columnist whose work concentrates on U.S. foreign policy. Currently, he is the Professor of International and Public Affairs at School of International and Public Affairs, Columbia University. He received recognition for his 2004 book Military Power: Explaining Victory and Defeat in Modern Battle, published through Princeton University Press. He also has worked in groups under Generals Stanley McChrystal and David Petraeus forming U.S. counter-insurgency policy.

== Background ==
=== Education and early career ===
Biddle was born and raised in Wilmington, Delaware, the son of Robert D. and Blanche V. Biddle. His parents frequently discussed politics, and they welcomed his input. Biddle later remarked that such debates took place "from almost as far back as I can remember" and that his father expressly encouraged him to think for himself. Biddle spent a lot of his childhood reading about military history and foreign affairs.

Biddle worked in internships in Washington D.C. that involved studying U.S. defense policy, but he remained skeptical as to whether he could (as he later put it) "actually make a living and pay the rent and eat regularly while doing this." Biddle earned a Bachelor's Degree in Fine Arts from Harvard, which had mostly involved reviewing art history, in 1981.

His first job after earning his degree was at a public policy think tank in the Washington, D.C. area that worked with the Office of the Secretary of Defense. He went on to operate 400,000-line Fortran models of combat scenarios outcomes between the Warsaw Pact and NATO from 1981 to 1983. Biddle's suspicions about the model's accuracy and about Defense Department statistical planning in general would later inspire the material in his first book, Military Power: Explaining Victory and Defeat in Modern Battle.

Biddle earned a Master's Degree in 1985 and then a Doctor of Philosophy in 1992, both of those degrees coming from Harvard and both focusing on American public policy. He later joked, "I got to know every bad restaurant in Harvard Square very well by the time I was done!" Biddle felt particularly inspired by mentor professors Albert Carnesale and Michael Nacht, political science experts who have since moved to U.C. Berkeley.

=== Later career ===
Biddle served as Professor of Political Science and International Affairs at the George Washington University's Elliott School of International Affairs before joining the faculty of School of International and Public Affairs, Columbia University in 2018. He joined the faculty there in August 2012, after serving as the Roger Hertog Senior Fellow for Defense Policy at the Council on Foreign Relations (CFR), which he joined in January 2006. He retains an affiliation with the Council as Adjunct Senior Fellow for Defense Policy. He formerly worked as an associate professor and Elihu Root chair of military studies at the U.S. Army War College's Strategic Studies Institute. His popular interest writings have appeared in multiple publications such as The New York Times, The Washington Post, The Wall Street Journal, The Boston Globe, The International Herald Tribune, and The Guardian.

Biddle's career has also included research and teaching posts at the University of North Carolina at Chapel Hill, the Institute for Defense Analyses (IDA), Harvard's Belfer Center for Science and International Affairs (BCSIA), and Harvard's Kennedy School of Government's Office of National Security Programs.

He published Military Power: Explaining Victory and Defeat in Modern Battle through Princeton University Press in 2004. The book has won multiple writing awards including CFR's Arthur Ross Award Silver Medal for 2005 and the 2005 Huntington Prize from the Olin Institute for Strategic Studies. Biddle extended his analysis to non-state actors in his 2021 book, Nonstate Warfare: The Military Methods of Guerrillas, Warlords, and Militias.

Biddle received the U.S. Army Superior Civilian Service Medal in 2003 and again in 2006. He received the U.S. Army Commander's Award for Public Service in 2007 as well. Within the U.S. military, he served on General Stanley McChrystal's Initial Strategic Assessment Team in Kabul in 2009, on General David Petraeus's Joint Strategic Assessment Team in Baghdad in 2007, and as a senior adviser to General Petraeus's Central Command Assessment Team in Washington in 2008–2009.

== Beliefs ==
Biddle stated in 2006 that the George W. Bush administration did not do "an adequate job" of establishing a grand strategy for the war on terror with specific aims and specifically defined enemies. He criticized the administration's approach as "quite vague". He called the Bush doctrine of 'rollback', in which the U.S. tries to end the root cause of terrorism by replacing failing autocracies in the Arab world with democracies, "a very demanding program" but a legitimate, if costly and risky, view.

He also remarked in 2006 that the War in Afghanistan had progressively grown more difficult for American forces since, at first, they fought untrained, amateur Taliban-related militants. Yet later on, according to Biddle, American forces began fighting well-trained foreign agents such as al-Qaeda operatives that incorporate Western-style infantry tactics. Biddle referred to the Afghan war in mid-2009 as "perhaps the most controversial and divisive issue in U.S. defense policy".

Biddle has argued generally about the U.S. military and its history,

Americans are a technology-obsessed people. I fancy myself a Luddite, and yet I have a Blackberry in my briefcase. Technology is all around us, it's everywhere, and Americans are just fascinated and intrigued with the stuff. So, when you deal with a society full of people who are fascinated with gadgets and gizmos, and then you ask them, "Now in war, do you think gadgets and gizmos matter?," most of us instinctively say, "Well, of course, they must." And the military, which comes out of this same society, is predisposed to expect that there's a great technological change right around the next bend in the road and it's going to change everything. People think that militaries are incredibly reactionary, conservative, resistant-to-change institutions, and yet the American military in particular has been—almost throughout its history, certainly since World War I—the exact opposite. They're way over-predisposed to expect that everything is going to change because of the next new gadget.

He has stated about U.S. power and prestige,

At the moment, we're in what political scientists describe as a unipolar world. There's one superpower, we overawe all other contestants, and that has a variety of advantages for the United States and some would argue for the world at large. But no condition of unipolarity is ever going to be permanent. Sooner or later—the Romans fell, the British Empire fell—sooner or later, there will be a contestant with the United States for this status, and an important responsibility of grand strategists and the American political elite is to delay, if we can, this condition of the rise of a rival power. Even if you think that the war on terror is our first priority, it remains at least an important responsibility to worry about the longer term future and what's going to happen if China, perhaps, or if India, or if some other rising power comes to challenge our current position in the world in ways that could create a risk of a much more serious military conflict at much higher levels of intensity with much higher levels of loss of life, and try and do what we can to postpone that day. It may be inevitable but it can be later rather than sooner.

== See also ==
- Members of the Council on Foreign Relations
- Max Boot
