= Friedrich Lohr =

German Ambassador to North Korea, Consul General to USA, diplomat to UN and China

Friedrich Lohr is a German diplomat and a scholar. Lohr served as Ambassador to North Korea from 2005 to 2007. Previously, he served as Deputy Chief of Mission (DCM) in Beijing, China, from 2002 to 2005.

== Career ==
Lohr has held several notable positions within the German Foreign Office, such as Minister-Counselor at the Department of Arms Control and Disarmament, Advisor at the Policy Planning Group of the Christian Democratic Parliamentary Group in the Bundestag, and Deputy Director of European Political Affairs at the Chancellor’s Office. His overseas assignments include serving as Chargé d’affaires in Nigeria, Deputy Chief of Mission in Algeria, Sudan, and Hungary, Consul in the Czech Republic, and Press Officer in Yugoslavia. Additionally, he has worked with the German Missions at the United Nations and the European Union. Lohr’s last diplomatic post was as German Consul General to the New England states, in the USA.

Lohr is currently a Professor of Practice at Northeastern University, a Visiting Professor of Government at Suffolk University, and a Fellow of the Weatherhead Center for International Affairs at Harvard University.
