= Claudia Olsson =

Swedish technology expert and business leader

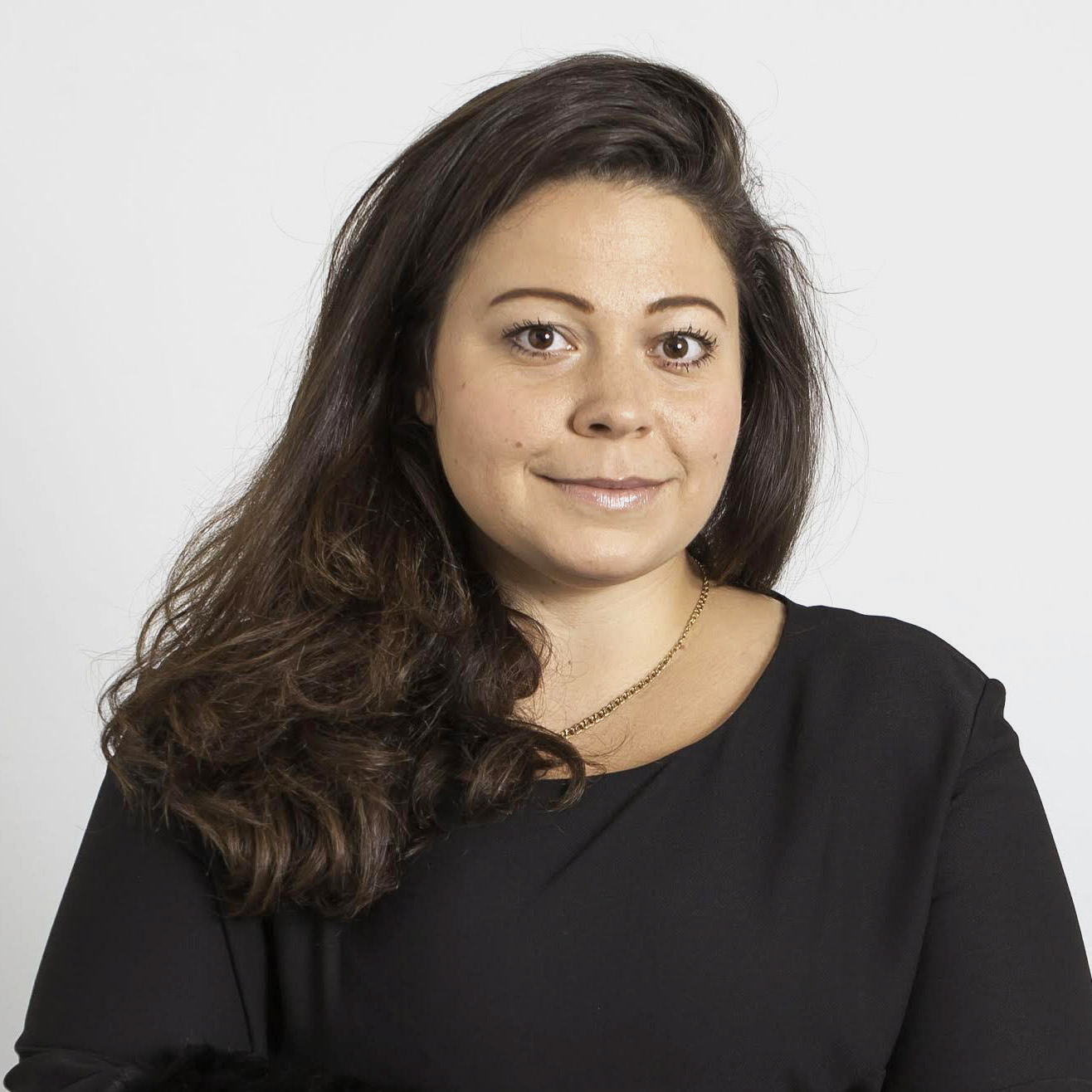
- Education: Stockholm School of Economics; Royal Institute of Technology; Wharton School
- Occupations: Entrepreneur, keynote speaker, AI expert
- Employer: Stellar Capacity
- Known for: Digital transformation, artificial intelligence, future skills
- Title: Founder and CEO of Stellar Capacity
- Board member of: Medicover
- Website: www.claudiaolsson.com

Claudia Olsson (born 27 December 1983) is a Swedish technology expert, business leader, and speaker with a background in engineering and economics. She is CEO and founder of Exponential AB, founder of Stellar Capacity AB, an Associate Faculty member at Singularity University, a David Rockefeller Fellow at the Trilateral Commission, as well as a Young Global Leader with the World Economic Forum.

== Education ==
Olsson studied International Economics and Business at Stockholm School of Economics as well as Industrial Engineering at KTH Royal Institute of Technology. She has also studied at INSA Lyon, France, and in Karlsruhe University, Germany. In 2001, she was among the 21 students selected to attend the inaugural program of the Raoul Wallenberg Academy. In 2009, Olsson was appointed the Energy Student of the Year in Sweden. In 2010, Olsson was the first Swedish participant to attend Singularity University's Graduate Studies Program. In 2017, she was selected for the Bucerius Summer School on Global Governance Claudia attended the Leadership at the Edge program with World Economic Forum at Said Business School, University of Oxford in 2019. In 2024, she graduated with an Executive MBA from The Wharton School of the University of Pennsylvania and was recognized as one of Poets & Quants' Best & Brightest Executive MBAs from the Wharton School.

== Career ==
Olsson started her career as Project Manager of the Stockholm International Youth Science Seminar for the Nobel Prize Committee and the Federation of Young Scientists. She then worked for the Swedish Trade Council in Warsaw and the United Nations Economic and Social Council (ECOSOC) in New York City. She set up and managed the policy think-tank ACCESS Health International in Singapore following her work for ACCESS in India. She then served as a senior advisor to the Office of Strategic Analysis at the Ministry for Foreign Affairs in Sweden. From 2010 to 2015, Olsson served as a board member of Project Playground, a Swedish non-profit organization aiming to improve the life opportunities of children and youth in South Africa. In 2014, Olsson founded Exponential AB, a global education company. Exponential has among other notable missions been tasked to author the Sweden 2030 Future Scenario for the Digitalization Commission of the Government of Sweden, a report released in 2016 focusing on the digital, integrated, smart and competitive society. Olsson also co-authored the report “Blockchain-Decentralized Trust” for the Entrepreneurship Forum. Also in 2014, Olsson founded Stellar Capacity AB, known as SpeakCharlie, a leading education company working to help professionals integrate in the Swedish society and to learn Swedish. The company has developed its own methodology leveraging new technologies and blended learning technique and aims to prepare citizens for a more globalized world. The same year, she became an Associate Faculty member at Singularity University following her engagement with the university as an advisor on Global Grand Challenges in 2013. In 2016, she was appointed a European David Rockefeller Fellow to the Trilateral Commission. In 2017, Olsson co-founded the executive program Decoding X at the Stockholm School of Economics. The same year, she began her engagement with the World Economic Forum in their Europe Policy Group. She also shares insights into technology and globalization through the editorial column of SvD. Claudia serves as member of the steering group at the Software Development Academy at the Royal Institute of Technology. In 2023, she was awarded the title of Sweden's Most Visionary Woman in Technology by the #addher awards.
