= Gerard C. Smith =

American attorney and defense expert (1913–1994)

Gerard Smith
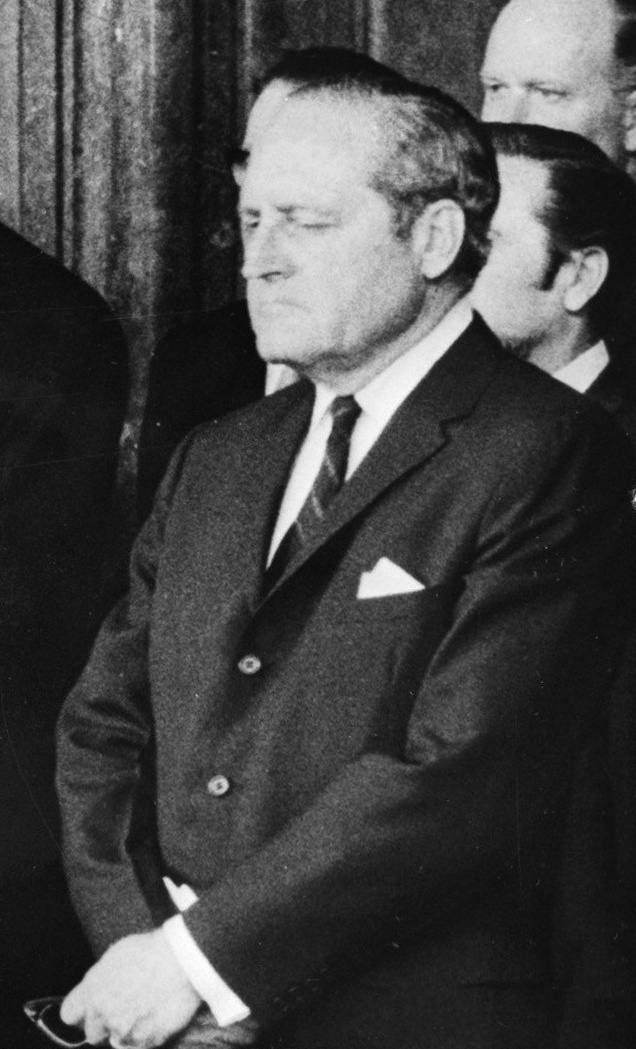

United States Ambassador to the International Atomic Energy Agency Special Representative for Nonproliferation Matters
- In office July 22, 1977 – November 10, 1980
- President: Jimmy Carter
- Preceded by: Gerald F. Tape
- Succeeded by: Richard T. Kennedy

Director of the Arms Control and Disarmament Agency
- In office February 7, 1969 – January 4, 1973
- President: Richard Nixon
- Preceded by: William Foster
- Succeeded by: Fred Iklé

4th Director of Policy Planning
- In office October 18, 1957 – January 20, 1961
- President: Dwight D. Eisenhower
- Preceded by: Robert R. Bowie
- Succeeded by: George C. McGhee

Personal details
- Born: Gerard Coad Smith; May 4, 1913 New York City, New York, U.S.
- Died: July 4, 1994 (aged 81) Easton, Maryland, U.S.
- Children: 4
- Education: Yale University (BA, LLB)
- Awards: Presidential Medal of Freedom (1981)

Military service
- Battles/wars: World War II

Gerard Coad Smith (May 4, 1914 – July 4, 1994) was an American attorney and defense expert who served as the chief U.S. delegate to the Strategic Arms Limitation Talks (SALT) in 1969 and the first U.S. Chairman of the Trilateral Commission. He was awarded the Presidential Medal of Freedom on January 16, 1981 by President Jimmy Carter.

== Early life and education ==
Smith was born in New York City. His father, John Thomas Smith, was a lawyer who served as general counsel of General Motors Corporation for many years. Gerard Smith graduated from Yale College in 1935 and Yale Law School in 1938.

He became a practicing attorney in New York City while maintaining a second home, Ratcliffe Manor, on Maryland's Eastern Shore. During World War II, he served as a procurement officer for the United States Department of the Navy in Washington, D.C.

== Career ==
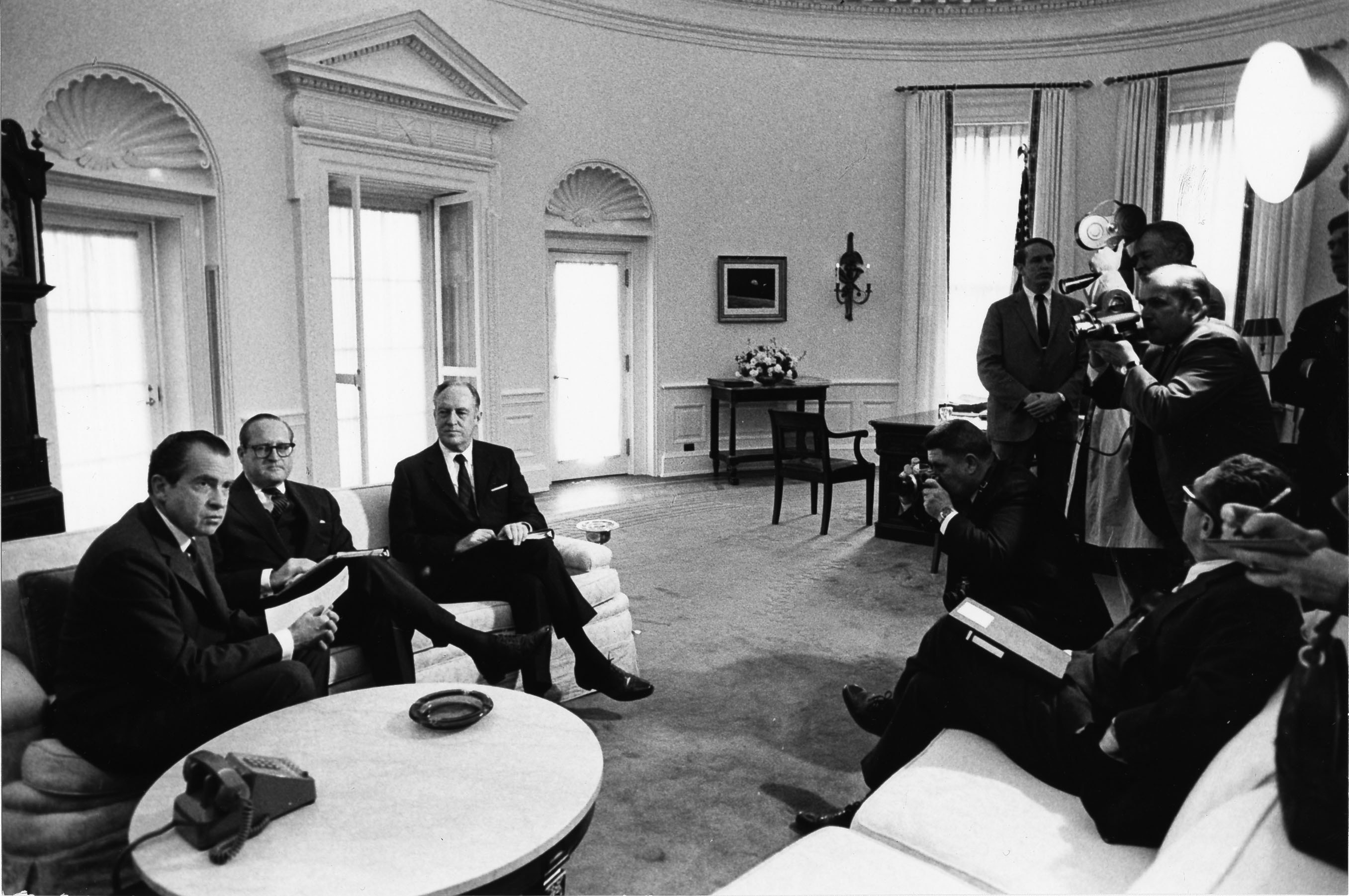
Smith with President Richard Nixon, Secretary of State William Rogers and Henry Kissinger on March 15, 1969.

In 1950, he returned to government service as a special assistant to Thomas E. Murray, a member of the Atomic Energy Commission. Smith became an expert in the international aspects of the use of nuclear energy and helped brief the members of the AEC on President Dwight D. Eisenhower’s Atoms for Peace proposal in 1953.

In 1954, Smith transferred to the Department of State and became a special assistant for atomic energy matters to Secretary of State John Foster Dulles. He continued to work on the international aspects of atomic energy and followed the disarmament negotiations between the U.S. and the Soviet Union which were being handled by Harold Stassen. In 1957, Smith was promoted to Director of Policy Planning, and became director of the policy planning staff. In this position, he was responsible for developing policy on a wide range of international matters, much of these related to sensitive areas of east-west relations. While in this role he proposed that a direct communications link between Moscow and Washington be established. President Kennedy would later credit Smith for the establishment of the so-called "hot line."

Smith returned to the private sector in 1961. He served as a consultant to a number of organizations and started his own magazine, Interplay, which promoted an internationalist viewpoint. During the John F. Kennedy and Lyndon B. Johnson administrations he also served as a special consultant to the Department of State on the Multilateral Force (MLF), an unsuccessful proposal to develop a military force in Western Europe.

At the start of the Nixon administration, Smith was appointed director of the Arms Control and Disarmament Agency (ACDA). He led the U.S. negotiating team during the Strategic Arms Limitation Talks (SALT) with the Soviet Union which resulted in the Antiballistic Missile (ABM) Treaty of 1972. Smith was North American Chairman of the Trilateral Commission from 1973 to 1977.

In 1973, following completion of the treaty, Smith again resigned from the government. David Rockefeller recruited him to help develop the Trilateral Commission, an organization which encouraged Japanese businessmen to become more active in American and European affairs. Smith served as chairman of the North American delegation to the Commission. In this position he became acquainted with Jimmy Carter, then the governor of Georgia, who was also active in the Commission.

In 1977, after Carter became president, he invited Smith to serve as a special presidential representative for non-proliferation matters. Smith traveled to a number of underdeveloped countries, including India, Pakistan, Brazil and South Africa, in an effort to discourage the countries from developing nuclear weapons. He also worked with the International Atomic Energy Agency (IAEA) to ensure that spent nuclear fuel was not diverted to weapons.

Smith resigned from the government for the last time in 1980. He organized a private consulting firm, the Consultants International Group, which specialized in advising companies on international investments. He also retained an interest in disarmament and was active in educational and lobbying organizations such as the Arms Control Association and the Washington Council on Non-Proliferation. He strongly opposed President Ronald Reagan’s proposed Strategic Defense Initiative (SDI; popularly known as “Star Wars”) which he felt violated the 1972 ABM Treaty, and together with George Kennan, McGeorge Bundy and Robert McNamara co-authored an article in Foreign Affairs calling upon the U.S. to declare a policy of "no first use" of nuclear weapons.

== Personal life ==
Smith and his wife, Bernice Latrobe Smith, had four children. He died in Easton, Maryland on July 4, 1994.

== Bibliography ==
- Gerard C. Smith, Disarming Diplomat: The Memoirs of Ambassador Gerard C. Smith, Arms Control Negotiator (1996; ISBN 1-56833-062-6)
- Gerard C. Smith, Doubletalk: The Story of the First Strategic Arms Limitation Talks (1980; ISBN 0-385-11444-3)
- Henry Owen, Gerard C. Smith, John Thomas Smith, Gerard C. Smith: a career in progress (1989; ISBN 0- 8191-7444-0)
- Gerard C. Smith, Kenneth W. Thompson, Gerard Smith on arms control (1989; ISBN 0-8191-6450-X)

Diplomatic posts
Preceded by Robert R. Bowie	Director of Policy Planning; 1957–1961	Succeeded by George C. McGhee
Preceded by William Foster	Director of the Arms Control and Disarmament Agency; 1969–1973	Succeeded by Fred Iklé
Preceded by Gerald F. Tape	United States Ambassador to the International Atomic Energy Agency; Special Representative for Nonproliferation Matters; 1977–1980	Succeeded by Richard T. Kennedy
