= Janine Zacharia =

American journalist

- Born: Janine Sherri Zacharia
- Occupation: Journalist

Janine Sherri Zacharia is an American journalist.

== Family ==
She is the daughter of Richard Zacharia, vice president of the Granada Sales Corporation in New York. She is married to Jeremy Bailenson, a Stanford University associate professor of communications.

== Personal ==
She graduated from Middlebury College in 1995 with a Bachelor of Arts degree in Literary Studies. During her time at Middlebury she served as president of the college chapter of Hillel International. She is a native of Long Island, New York.

== Career ==
She was appointed as the Middle East correspondent for The Washington Post in December 2009. She previously worked as a reporter for Reuters in Israel, the Washington bureau chief for The Jerusalem Post for five years and a diplomatic reporter for Bloomberg News from 2005 to 2009. She also writes for The New Republic and makes regular appearances on MSNBC, CNN, and PBS's Washington Week. From December 2009 through April 2011, she was Jerusalem Bureau Chief and Middle East Correspondent for The Washington Post. During her time there, she covered the West Bank and Gaza Strip and has reported from Egypt, Jordan, Lebanon, Iraq, Bahrain, Saudi Arabia, the UAE and Turkey. After leaving the Post, she was appointed Carlos Kelly McClatchy Visiting Lecturer in the Communication Department at Stanford University in May 2011. In 2021 Zacharia spoke in defence of Emily Wilder, a former student of hers, when Wilder was fired by the Associated Press following a campaign against her by conservatives highlighting pro-Palestinian statements she had made during her college years.

== Honors and awards ==
Zacharia was awarded a Knight Journalism Fellowship at Stanford University for the 2008–2009 academic year. She has been a member of the Council on Foreign Relations since 2013.
