= Robert R. Bowie =

American academic

3rd Director of Policy Planning
- In office May 28, 1953 – August 2, 1957
- President: Dwight D. Eisenhower
- Preceded by: Paul H. Nitze
- Succeeded by: Gerard C. Smith

15th Counselor of the United States Department of State
- In office September 21, 1966 – April 1, 1968
- President: Lyndon B. Johnson
- Preceded by: Walt Whitman Rostow
- Succeeded by: Richard F. Pedersen

Personal details
- Born: August 24, 1909 Baltimore, Maryland, U.S.
- Died: November 2, 2013 (aged 104) Towson, Maryland, U.S.
- Education: Princeton University; Harvard University

Robert Richardson Bowie (August 24, 1909 – November 2, 2013) was an American diplomat and scholar.

Bowie graduated from Princeton University in 1931 and received a law degree from Harvard University in 1934 and turned down offers to work as a corporate lawyer with New York's major law firms, returning to Baltimore to work in his father's law firm, Bowie and Burke. He served in the U.S. Army (1942–1946) as a commissioned officer with the Pentagon and in occupied Germany from 1945 until 1946. In 1946 he resigned as a lieutenant-colonel. He taught at Harvard from 1946-1955. The youngest professor of the school, he was a trusted confidant to John J. McCloy, the "unofficial chairman of the American establishment." During periods of leave from Harvard between 1950 and 1952 Bowie worked for McCloy as one of his legal advisers in West Germany.

He served as Director of Policy Planning from 1953–1957; co-founder, with Henry Kissinger, of Harvard's Center for International Affairs (1958); Counselor for the State Department from 1966-1968. He was a member of the Council on Foreign Relations, the Trilateral Commission, the American Law Institute, and the American Academy of Diplomacy. He is a recipient of the Legion of Merit and the Commander's Cross of the Order of Merit of the Federal Republic of Germany.

He served as CIA chief National Intelligence Officer from 1977-1979.

He died at the age of 104 in November 2013.

== Books ==
- Waging Peace: How Eisenhower Shaped an Enduring Cold War Strategy, by Robert R. Bowie and Richard H. Immerman, Oxford UP, 1998, ISBN 0-19-506264-7. Endnotes
- Suez, 1956, Oxford UP
- Shaping the Future: Foreign Policy in an Age of Transition, Columbia UP
