= Assistant to the President and Deputy National Security Advisor for Iraq and Afghanistan =

The assistant to the president and deputy national security advisor for Iraq and Afghanistan, known more informally as the war czar, was a position the George W. Bush administration created to oversee the wars in Iraq and Afghanistan with authority to issue directions to the Pentagon, the State Department, and other agencies.

Previous to the creation of the "war czar" position, deputy national security advisor Meghan O'Sullivan was primarily responsible for White House programs related to the war, under the direction of the national security advisor, Stephen J. Hadley, and without authority to issue interagency orders. O'Sullivan's resignation allowed the administration the opportunity to reorganize. The position was offered to three retired generals, John J. Sheehan, Jack Keane, and Joseph Ralston, before the appointment of Lieutenant General Douglas Lute in May 2007; Lute was confirmed by the Senate on June 28, 2007, and reported both to the President and the National Security Advisor with the rank of full assistant to the president. He continued to hold this position in the Barack Obama administration. Under President Obama, he then answered to the new national security advisor Thomas E. Donilon.

The positions were abolished after Lute's demitting from office.

== See also ==
- Czar (political term)
