= Russell Cornell Leffingwell =

American banker (1878–1960)

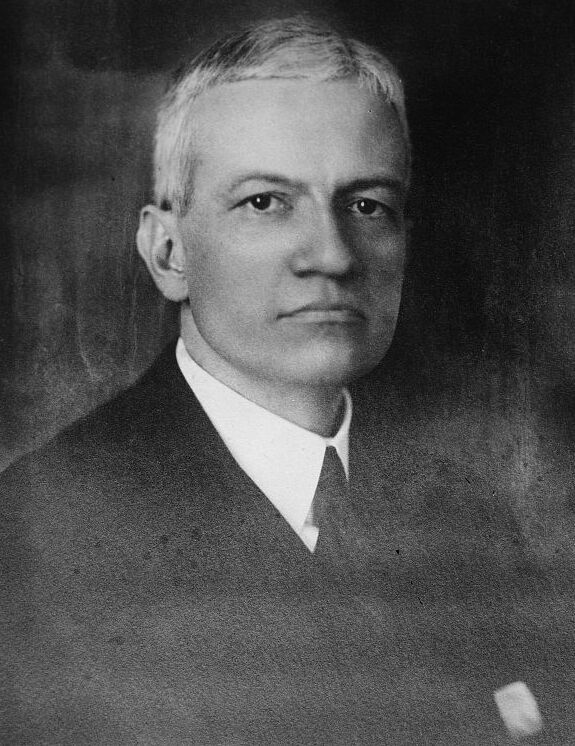
- Leffingwell circa 1913
- Born: September 10, 1878; United States
- Died: October 2, 1960 (aged 82)
- Occupation: Banker
- Known for: Former chairman of J.P. Morgan and led the US Council on Foreign Relations from 1944 until 1953

Russell Cornell Leffingwell (September 10, 1878 – October 2, 1960) was an American banker who led the Council on Foreign Relations from 1944 until 1953. From 1944 to 1946, he served as president of the Council, and from 1946 to 1953, he served as the organization's first chairman. He was also a trustee of Carnegie Corporation from 1923 to 1959. His banking career, which focused on international lending, started when he joined J.P. Morgan in 1923, and he retired as chairman of the company in 1950.

In reference to the economic problems of the early 1930s, he is reported to have said: "The remedy is for people to stop watching the ticker, listening to the radio, drinking bootleg gin, and dancing to jazz... and return to the old economics and prosperity based on saving and working."

Business positions
Preceded by Thomas W. Lamont	Chairman of J.P. Morgan & Co. 1948 – 1950	Succeeded by George Whitney
