= Meghan O'Sullivan =

Chairman of the Trilateral Commission North American

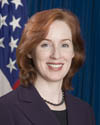

Deputy National Security Advisor for Iraq and Afghanistan
- In office July 12, 2004 – September 15, 2007
- President: George W. Bush
- Preceded by: Frank Taylor
- Succeeded by: Douglas Lute

Personal details
- Born: Lexington, Massachusetts, U.S.
- Party: Republican
- Education: Georgetown University (BA); Brasenose College, Oxford (MA, PhD)

Meghan L. O'Sullivan is a former deputy national security adviser on Iraq and Afghanistan. She is Jeane Kirkpatrick Professor of the Practice of International Affairs at Harvard Kennedy School and a board member of the Belfer Center for Science and International Affairs at Kennedy School. She is a member of the board of directors of the Council on Foreign Relations, and Raytheon, and the North American chair of the Trilateral Commission.

== Early life and education ==
O'Sullivan grew up in Lexington, Massachusetts.

She received her bachelor's degree from Georgetown University in 1991. O'Sullivan later received her master's degree in economics, and her D.Phil. in politics in 1999 from Brasenose College, Oxford. Her doctoral dissertation was entitled "Identity and institutions in ethnic conflict: the Muslims of Sri Lanka".

== Career ==
O'Sullivan was an aide to Sen. Daniel Patrick Moynihan, and between 1998 and 2001 a fellow at the Brookings Institution under Richard N. Haass.

Between November 2001 and March 2003, O'Sullivan served in the Office of Policy Planning at the State Department, where she assisted Colin Powell in developing the smart sanctions policy proposal.

Following the 2003 invasion of Iraq, she volunteered for the Office for Reconstruction and Humanitarian Assistance under Jay Garner. Defense Secretary Donald Rumsfeld told Jay Garner that he could not keep her (or Tom Warrick) on in Iraq, though Rumsfeld later relented. She was an assistant to Paul Bremer in the Coalition Provisional Authority. Starting July 2004, she was Senior Director for Iraq and Afghanistan at the United States National Security Council. O'Sullivan's last position at the White House was as the Special Assistant to the President and Deputy National Security Advisor for Iraq and Afghanistan from October 2005 to September 2007 where she frequently communicated via telephone with Fort Leavenworth's General David Petraeus on a new military strategy for Iraq.

During her time in Iraq, O'Sullivan was involved with many key decisions on the political front, including helping to negotiate the early transfer of sovereignty to the Iraqis and assisting the Iraqis in writing their interim constitution. She is remembered for driving herself around Baghdad to meet with Iraqis, and endured some harrowing experiences while in Iraq, including escaping from a terrorist attack by scaling a building ledge ten stories up.

On May 31, 2007, President Bush announced that O'Sullivan was returning to Baghdad:

to serve with Ambassador Crocker, to help the Iraqis – and to help the Embassy help the Iraqis – meet the benchmarks that the Congress and the President expect to get passed.

With Stephen Hadley, she is also credited as being one of the original advocates in the White House of the 2007 "surge" strategy. On September 15, 2007, she left the White House and began teaching at Harvard.

She was an advisor to Mitt Romney during his 2012 presidential campaign. In 2013, O'Sullivan was a signatory to an amicus curiae brief submitted to the Supreme Court in support of same-sex marriage during the Hollingsworth v. Perry case. During 2013, she acted as Vice-Chair to Richard Haass at talks between the political parties in Northern Ireland.

O'Sullivan is also a One Young World counsellor, speaking about "Peace & Conflict Resolution to a group of 1,300 young people in Dublin, Ireland in 2013. O'Sullivan is currently the Chairwoman of the North American branch of the Rockefeller Trilateral Commission.

== Controversy ==
Nonprofit and media reports have questioned whether O'Sullivan's academic work has been shaped by conflicts of interest. O'Sullivan, a noted climate scholar, has sat on the board of global oil corporation Hess. At the Harvard Kennedy School, she leads the Geopolitics of Energy initiative. According to a 2021 investigative report from student group Fossil Fuel Divest Harvard on funding Harvard research, this initiative has received funding from BP, and took steps to cover up this fact after becoming aware of investigatory efforts into the initiative's funding sources.

O'Sullivan was instrumental in the 2003 Invasion of Iraq. In April 2021, the Washington Post issued a correction to an op-ed by O'Sullivan after the original version failed to disclose her board membership at Raytheon Corp, one of the largest weapons manufacturers in the world.

== Published works ==
- Shrewd Sanctions: Statecraft and State Sponsors of Terrorism. Brookings Institution Press. 2003. ISBN 0-8157-0601-4.
- Windfall, Simon and Schuster (2017)
- Honey and Vinegar: Incentives, Sanctions, and Foreign Policy, edited with Richard N. Haass, Brookings Institution Press (2000), ISBN 0-8157-3355-0. [edit] By Meghan L. O'Sullivan
- Sanctioning 'Rogue' States: A Strategy in Decline?, Harvard International Review, Summer 2000.
- "Terms of Engagement: Alternatives to Punitive Policies" with Richard N. Haass, Survival, 42:2 (Summer 2000), The International Institute for Strategic Studies.
- "Iraq: Time for a Modified Approach", Brookings Institution (IraqWatch), February 2001.
- "Sanctions and U.S. Foreign Policy", with Raymond Tanter, Washington Institute for Near East Policy, March 13, 2001.
- "The Response to Terrorism: America Mobilizes", Brookings Institution Forum, September 21, 2002. Moderator: James B. Steinberg; Scholars: Thomas E. Mann, Michael E. O'Hanlon, and Meghan L. O'Sullivan.
- "The Politics of Dismantling Containment", The Washington Quarterly 27:1 (Winter 2001), pp. 67–76. Copyright 2000 by The Center for Strategic and International Studies, Massachusetts Institute of Technology.
- "The Problem with Obama's Decision to Leave Iraq," Foreign Affairs Magazine, October 28, 2011.
