= The Globalist =

Online magazine

- Website type: Online magazine
- Available in: English
- Creator: Stephan Richter
- Editor: Stephan Richter
- Website: theglobalist.com
- Launched: 2000

The Globalist is a daily online magazine that "focuses on the economics, politics and culture" of globalization. The Globalist "aims to provide current and up-to-date news analysis and perspectives on wide-ranging global issues that touch all global citizens". Notable columnists include Alexei Bayer & Richard Walker.

Its offices are in Washington, D.C., United States, and it began publishing on January 3, 2000. The Globalist was founded by Stephan Richter, who is also its publisher and editor-in-chief. The Globalist, in addition to its English-language flagship, also publishes German- and French-language editions.
