= Richard Kogan (businessman) =

American businessman (born 1941)

Richard Kogan (born 1941) is an American businessman. He served as the president and chief executive officer of Schering-Plough from 1996 to 2003, and its chairman from 1998 to 2002.

== Biography ==
=== Early life ===
He was born in 1941 in New York City. He graduated from the City College of New York and received an M.B.A. from the New York University Stern School of Business.

=== Career ===
He joined Schering-Plough as executive vice president for pharmaceutical operations in 1982. In 1986, he became president and chief operating officer. From 1996 to 2003, he served as president and CEO, and from 1998 to 2002 as chairman of the board.

He has served on the board of directors of Colgate-Palmolive and The Bank of New York Mellon. He also sits on the boards of trustees of the Saint Barnabas Medical Center and New York University, where he also sits on the board of overseers of the Stern School of Business. He is a member of the Council on Foreign Relations.
