= List of current honorary knights and dames of the Order of St Michael and St George =

This is a list of current honorary knights and dames of the Order of St Michael and St George.

== Honorary knights and dames ==
=== Grand cross (GCMG) ===
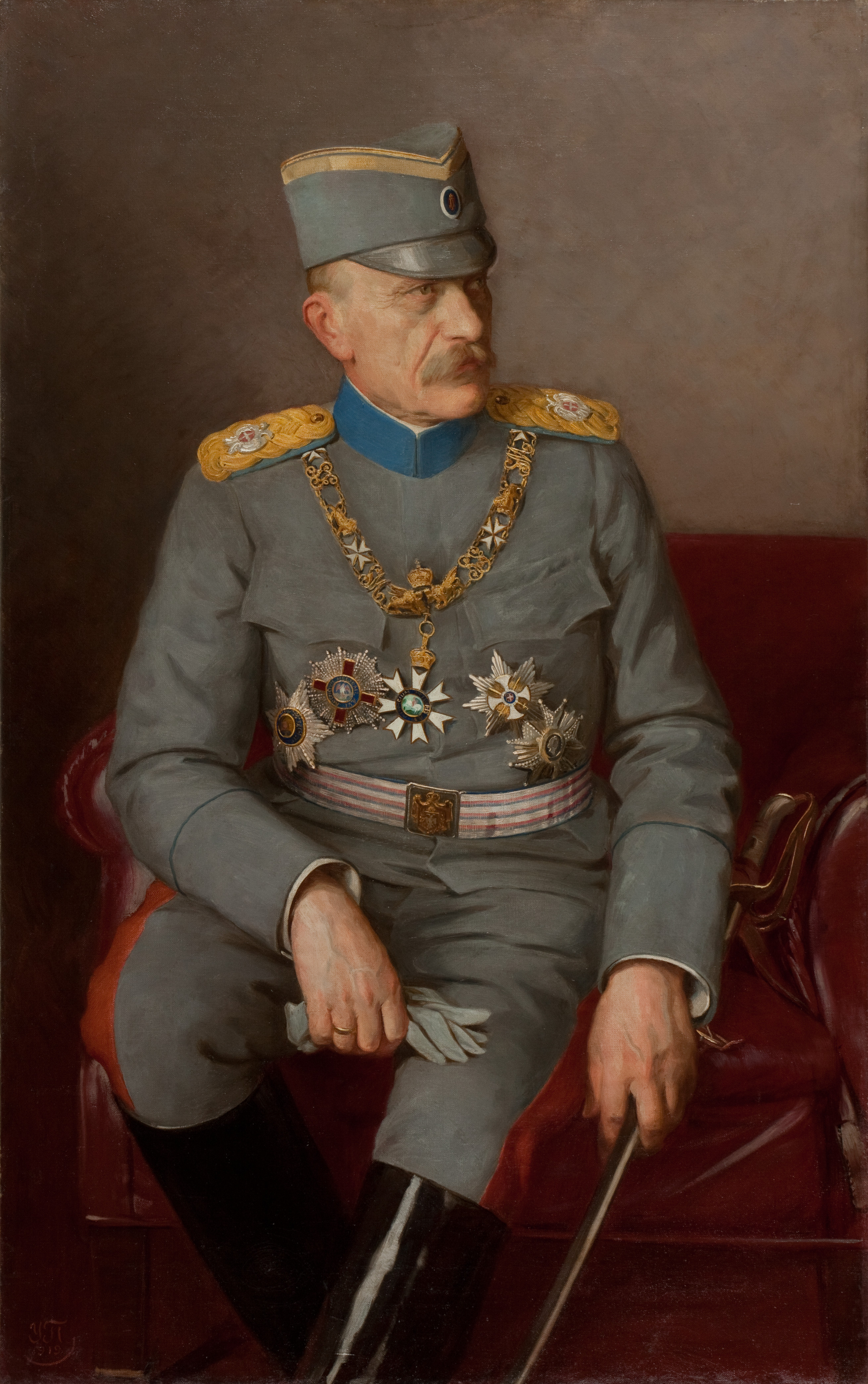
Star and collar of honorary GCMG worn by Serbian Field Marshal Živojin Mišić

Name	Post-nominals	Known for	Year appointed
(Iceland) Vigdís Finnbogadóttir	GCB GCMG	Former President of Iceland	1982
Sultan Hassanal Bolkiah of Brunei	GCB GCMG	Sultan of Brunei	1984
(Qatar) Abdelaziz bin Khalifa Al Thani	GCMG	Member of the Qatari royal family	1985
Gyanendra of Nepal	GCMG	Former King of Nepal	1986
(Poland) Aleksander Kwaśniewski	GCB GCMG	Former President of Poland	1996
(Maldives) Maumoon Abdul Gayoom	GCMG	Former President of the Maldives	1997
(Pakistan) Nawaz Sharif	GCMG	Former Prime Minister of Pakistan	1997
(Mexico) Ernesto Zedillo	GCMG	Former President of Mexico	1998
(Hungary) János Martonyi	GCMG	Former Minister of Foreign Affairs of Hungary	1999
Abdullah II of Jordan	GCB GCMG GCVO	King of Jordan	1999
(Denmark) Friis Arne Petersen	GCMG	Former Director of the Ministry of Foreign Affairs of Denmark	2000
(Italy) Giuliano Amato	GCMG	Former Prime Minister of Italy	2000
(Italy) Lamberto Dini	GCMG	Former Prime Minister of Italy	2000
(Italy) Umberto Vattani	GCMG	Former Secretary General of the Ministry of Foreign Affairs of Italy	2000
(Romania) Emil Constantinescu	GCMG	Former President of Romania	2000
(South Africa) Thabo Mbeki	GCB GCMG	Former President of South Africa	2000
(Kazakhstan) Nursultan Nazarbayev	GCMG	Former President of Kazakhstan	2000
(Croatia) Stjepan Mesić	GCMG	Former President of Croatia	2001
(Hong Kong) Anson Chan	GCMG CBE JP	Former Chief Secretary of Hong Kong	2002
(Mexico) Vicente Fox	GCMG	Former President of Mexico	2002
(Timor-Leste) Xanana Gusmão	GCMG CNZM	Prime Minister of East Timor	2003
(Islamic Republic of Afghanistan) Hamid Karzai	GCMG	Former President of Afghanistan	2003
(Albania) Alfred Moisiu	GCMG	Former President of Albania	2003
(Poland) Włodzimierz Cimoszewicz	GCMG	Former Prime Minister of Poland	2004
(Italy) Gianfranco Fini	GCMG	Former Deputy Prime Minister of Italy	2005
(United Arab Emirates) Mohammed bin Rashid Al Maktoum	GCMG GBE	Ruler of Dubai, Vice President and Prime Minister of the United Arab Emirates	2010
(United Arab Emirates) Mohamed bin Zayed Al Nahyan	GCMG	President of the United Arab Emirates	2010
(France) Manuel Valls	GCMG	Former Prime Minister of France	2014
(Malta) Marie Louise Coleiro Preca	GCMG	Former President of Malta	2015
(Oman) Haitham bin Tariq	GCB GCMG GCVO	Sultan of Oman	2021

=== Commander (KCMG/DCMG) ===
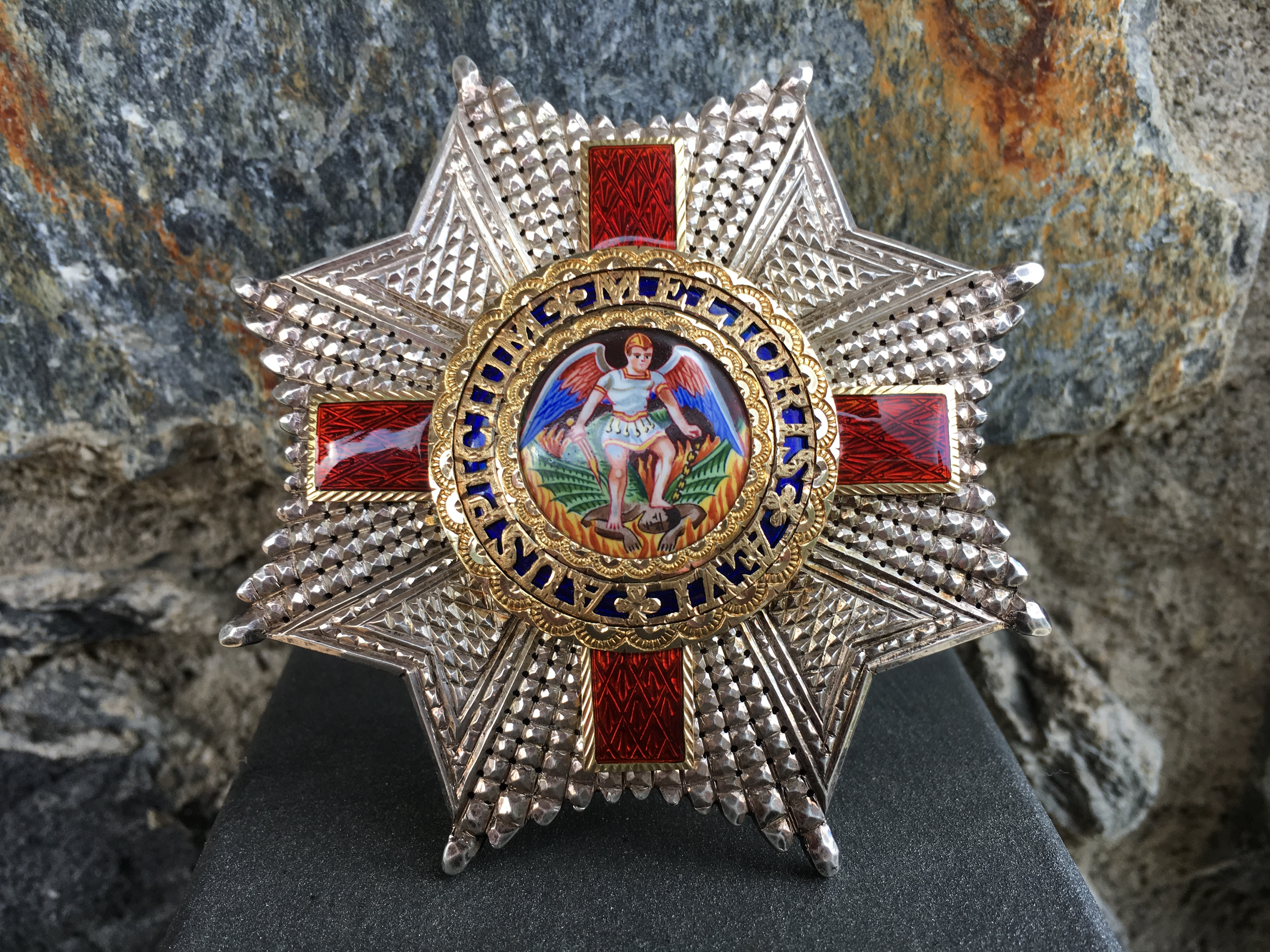
Knight Commander star of the Order of Saint Michael and Saint George

Name	Post-nominals	Known for	Year appointed
(Bahrain) Hamad bin Isa Al Khalifa	GCVO, KCMG	King of Bahrain	1979
(Brazil) Frederico Cezar de Araujo	KCMG	Brazilian diplomat	1997
(Brazil) Gelson Fonseca	KCMG	Brazilian diplomat	1997
(Brazil) Affonso Emilio de Alencastro Massot	KCMG	Brazilian diplomat	1997
(Japan) Takekazu Kawamura	KCMG	Japanese diplomat	1998
(Sweden) Carl Bildt	KCMG	Former Prime Minister of Sweden & High Representative for Bosnia	1998
(Hungary) József Szájer	KCMG	Former Chairman of the European Integration Select Committee	1999
(Italy) Carmela Decaro Bonella	DCMG	Former Deputy Director General and Director of the President of Italy's Office	2000
(Italy) Luigi Guidobono Cavalchini Garofoli	KCMG	Former Private Secretary to the Foreign Minister of Italy	2000
(Italy) Francesco Olivieri	KCMG	Former Diplomatic Adviser to the Prime Minister of Italy	2000
(Spain) Javier Solana	KCMG	Former Secretary General of NATO	2000
(Germany) Klaus Schwab	KCMG	World Economic Forum head	2006
(Netherlands) Jaap de Hoop Scheffer	KCMG	Former Secretary General of NATO	2010
(Greece) Efthymios Mitropoulos	KCMG	Former Secretary-General of International Maritime Organization	2012
(Indonesia) Marzuki Alie	KCMG	Former Speaker of the Indonesian House of Representatives	2012
(Indonesia) Irman Gusman	KCMG	Former Speaker of the Indonesian House of Regional Representatives	2012
(Indonesia) Marty Natalegawa	KCMG	Former Minister of Foreign Affairs of Indonesia	2012
(United Arab Emirates) Abdullah bin Zayed Al Nahyan	KCMG	Minister of Foreign Affairs of the UAE	2013
(South Korea) Yun Byung-se	KCMG	Former Minister of Foreign Affairs of South Korea	2013
(United States) Angelina Jolie	DCMG	American actress, filmmaker, humanitarian	2014
(France) Laurent Fabius	KCMG	Former Minister of Foreign Affairs of France	2014
(France) Laurent Stefanini	KCMG	Former Ambassador, Chief of Protocol to President Hollande	2014
(Singapore) Grace Fu	DCMG	Former Second Minister for Foreign Affairs of Singapore	2014
(Denmark) Anders Fogh Rasmussen	KCMG	Former Prime Minister of Denmark & Secretary General of NATO	2015
(Mexico) José Antonio Meade Kuribreña	KCMG	Former Secretary of Foreign Affairs of Mexico	2015
(Malta) Joseph Muscat	KCMG	Former Prime Minister of Malta	2015
(Malta) George Vella	KCMG	Former Minister of Foreign Affairs of Malta and President of Malta	2018
(Jordan) Zeid Raad Al Hussein	KCMG	Former United Nations High Commissioner for Human Rights	2019
(Kuwait) Khaled Al-Duwaisan	GCVO, KCMG	Kuwaiti diplomat	2022
(United States) John Kerry	KCMG	Former United States Secretary of State	2025
