= Belfer Center for Science and International Affairs =

Arms control and foreign policy research organization in the Kennedy School at Harvard

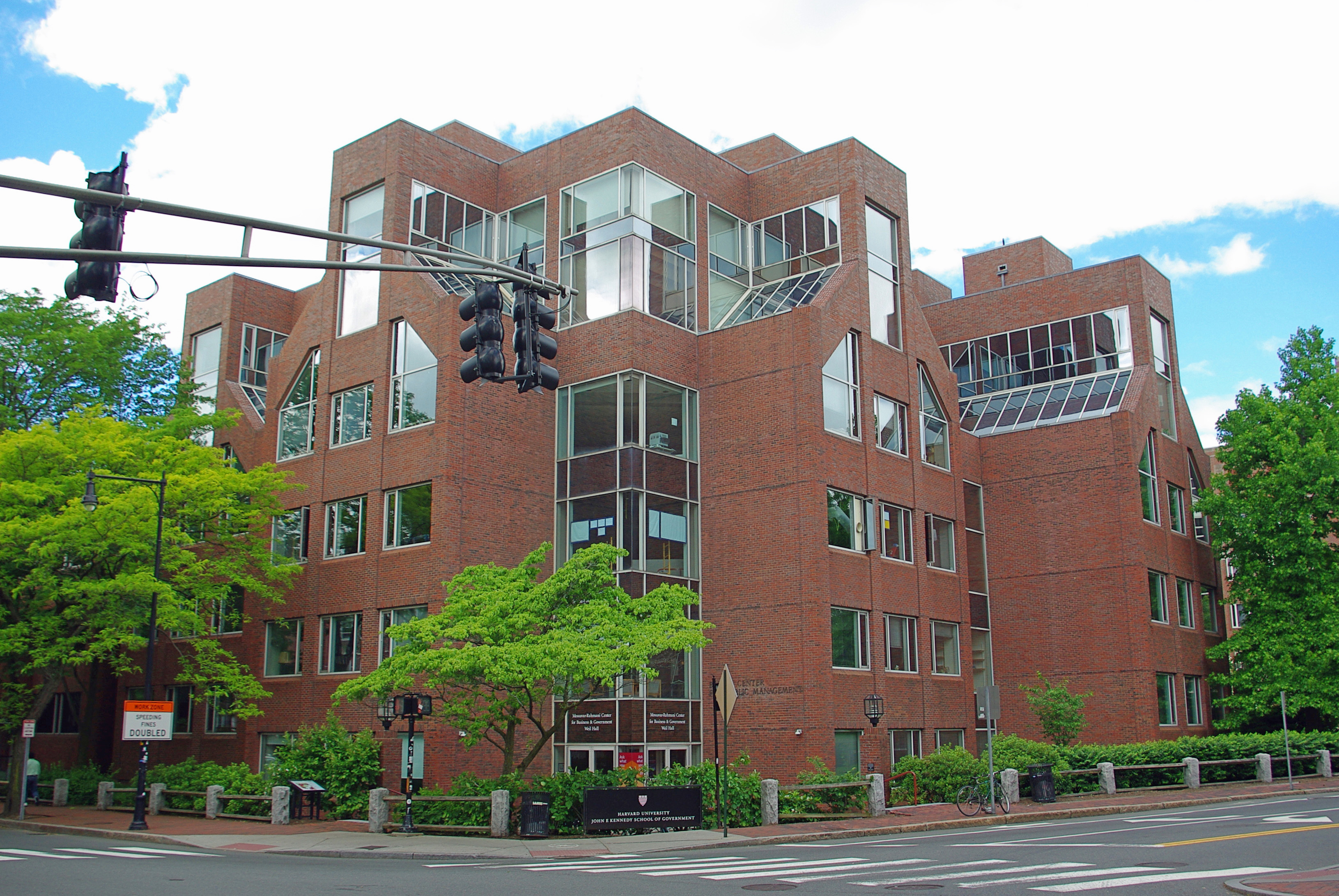
- The Belfer Center
- Named after: Robert A. Belfer
- Formation: 1973
- Type: Think tank
- Headquarters: 79 John F. Kennedy Street
- Location: Cambridge, Massachusetts, U.S.
- Director: Meghan O'Sullivan
- Parent organization: Harvard Kennedy School
- Website: belfercenter.org

The Robert and Renée Belfer Center for Science and International Affairs, also known as the Belfer Center, is a research center located at the Harvard Kennedy School at Harvard University in Cambridge, Massachusetts, in the United States.

From 2017 until his death in October 2022, the center was led by director Ash Carter, former U.S. Secretary of Defense and co-director Eric Rosenbach, a former U.S. Assistant Secretary of Defense. Its current executive director is Natalie Colbert. The current director is Meghan O'Sullivan.

== About ==
The Belfer Center for Science and International Affairs is the hub of Harvard Kennedy School's research, teaching, and training in international security and diplomacy, environmental and resource issues, and science and technology policy.

== History ==
During the Cold War, Paul M. Doty, a Harvard biochemist, was concerned about the US-USSR relations at the time. After realizing the lack of courses on arms control and international university in universities, Doty thought of a program in Harvard dedicated to these areas.

== Controversies ==
In 2012, the Stanton Foundation provided funds for a paid Wikipedian in residence at the Belfer Center. This became controversial due to links between the Belfer Center and the Stanton Foundation (the directors of each are a married couple) and public concerns about conflict-of-interest editing on Wikipedia. The center is organized into subgroups with specific areas of focus.

A 2021 investigative report by student group Fossil Fuel Divest Harvard found that many of the center's climate initiatives were funded in part by fossil fuel companies, and that the center had allegedly taken several steps to cover up that fact.
