= Aspen Strategy Group =

American foreign policy think tank

- Abbreviation: ASG
- Formation: 1984
- Type: Foreign Policy, National Security
- Headquarters: Washington, DC
- Location: Washington, DC
- Founders: Joseph Nye, William J. Perry, and Brent Scowcroft
- Co-Chairs: R. Nicholas Burns and Condoleezza Rice
- Executive Director: Anja Manuel
- Website: www.aspeninstitute.org/asg

The Aspen Strategy Group (ASG) is a policy program of the Aspen Institute, based in Washington D.C. The ASG convenes decision-makers and thought leaders in nonpartisan public and private forums to discuss the most pressing challenges in U.S. national security and foreign policy.

Notably, the ASG presents the Aspen Security Forum in Aspen, Colorado each summer and Washington, DC each winter. Its private convenings include the ASG Summer Workshop and Track II Strategic Dialogues. Additionally, the ASG Rising Leaders Program cultivates the next generation of leaders in national security and foreign policy.

== Aspen Strategy Group ==
Since its founding in 1984, the Aspen Strategy Group (ASG) has provided a nonpartisan forum to explore the preeminent national security and foreign policy challenges facing the United States.

The ASG meets annually with invited experts and decision-makers at the Summer Workshop to discuss and anticipate the most pressing issues in U.S. foreign policy and national security. Past sessions have focused on cybersecurity, artificial intelligence, U.S. grand strategy, nuclear proliferation, and much more. Additionally, the Aspen Strategy Group regularly brings together high-level delegations for Track II Strategic Dialogues with its partners in Europe and China.

Members of the Aspen Strategy Group include leaders from across the government, the military, academic institutions, the media, nonprofits, think tanks, and private industry.

== Aspen Security Forum ==
The Aspen Strategy Group’s flagship annual public program, the Aspen Security Forum, is the premier foreign policy and national security conference in North America. Held each summer in Aspen, Colorado since 2010, the Forum features discussions on the most pressing issues of our time, with speakers including U.S. and international government officials, business executives, leading academics, noted journalists, and more.

The Aspen Security Forum: DC Edition is held each winter in Washington, DC. The DC Forum is a smaller gathering of U.S. and international policymakers.

== Rising Leaders Program ==
The ASG founded the Rising Leaders Program in 2021 to formalize its commitment to fostering the next generation of leaders in national security and foreign policy. The year-long program brings together young leaders in the field to contribute to the conversation on critical foreign policy issues while honing their leadership skills.

== Leadership ==
- Nicholas Burns, Co-Chair
- Condoleezza Rice, Co-Chair
- Anja Manuel, Executive Director
- Niamh King, Director
