= National Security Study Memorandum 200 =

1974 American memo on population control

National Security Study Memorandum 200

National Security Study Memorandum 200: Implications of Worldwide Population Growth for U.S. Security and Overseas Interests (NSSM200), was a National Security Study requested by Richard Nixon on April 24th, 1974, in preparation for the United Nations Third World Population Conference.

The Conference was held between August 19-30 1974, in Bucharest, Romania. The conference was attended by 135 nations. The United States was one of dozens of nations who contributed to the final report.

A summary of recommendations from the NSSM200 was provided to President Ford on December 14th, 1974

The NSSM200, as well as the United Nations Third World Population Report, became the subject of numerous Neo-Malthusian conspiracy theories.

== Background ==
President Richard Nixon's order for the NSSM 200

The basic thesis of the report of the memorandum was that population growth in the least developed countries (LDCs) is a concern to US national security, because excess population growth, growth that exceeded local food, water, housing, waste handling and other humanitarian concerns would first cause local suffering would tend to risk civil unrest and political instability. The policy gives paramount importance to population growth planning measures and the promotion of contraception among 13 populous countries to stem rapid over population growth."

== Contents ==
In summary, the report of NSSM200 provides four main observations:

1. Population growth of LDCs if it outpaces economic development will likely create suffering and political instability – instability that may be detrimental to US interests.
2. The United States relies on many of these countries for many natural resources.
3. High birth rates may result in growth in younger individuals who come to oppose established governments if economic conditions do not support their livelihoods.
4. American foreign businesses investments will become vulnerable to interference by foreign governments struggling to provide basic humanitarian support for rapidly growing populations.

It recommends that US leadership influence national leaders and that improved world-wide support for population-related efforts should be sought through increased emphasis on mass media and other population education and motivation programs by the UN, USIA, and USAID.

=== Named countries ===
Thirteen countries are named in the report as particularly high growth rates and simultaneously problematic economic and political conditions to support that growth, and with respect to US security interests: India, Bangladesh, Pakistan, Indonesia, Thailand, the Philippines, Turkey, Nigeria, Egypt, Ethiopia, Mexico, Colombia, and Brazil. The countries were projected to create 47 percent of all world population growth.

=== General overview ===
The report from NSSM200 takes a look at worldwide demographic population trends as projected in 1974 by the United Nations.

It is well divided into two major sections: an analytical section and policy recommendations.

The policy recommendations is divided into two sections. A US population strategy and action to create conditions for decline in fertility growth. A major concern reiterated in the memo concerns the effect of population growth and economic development on famine and health.

"Growing populations will have a serious impact on the need for food especially in the poorest, fastest growing LDCs.[least developed countries] While under normal weather conditions and assuming food production growth in line with recent trends, total world agricultural production could expand faster than population, there will nevertheless be serious problems in food distribution and financing, making shortages, even at today's poor nutrition levels, probable in many of the larger more populous LDC regions. Even today 10 to 20 million people die each year due, directly or indirectly, to malnutrition. Even more serious is the consequence of major crop failures which are likely to occur from time to time.

"The most serious consequence for the short and middle term is the possibility of massive famines in certain parts of the world, especially the poorest regions. World needs for food will rise by 2.5 percent or more per year (making a modest allowance for improved diets and nutrition) at a time when readily available fertilizer and well-watered land is already largely being utilized. Therefore, additions to food production must come mainly from higher yields.

"Countries with large population growth cannot afford constantly growing imports, but for them to raise food output steadily by 2 to 4 percent over the next generation or two is a formidable challenge."

The report of the NSSM200 was used by USAID for population planning
