= Weatherhead Center for International Affairs =

Research center within Harvard University

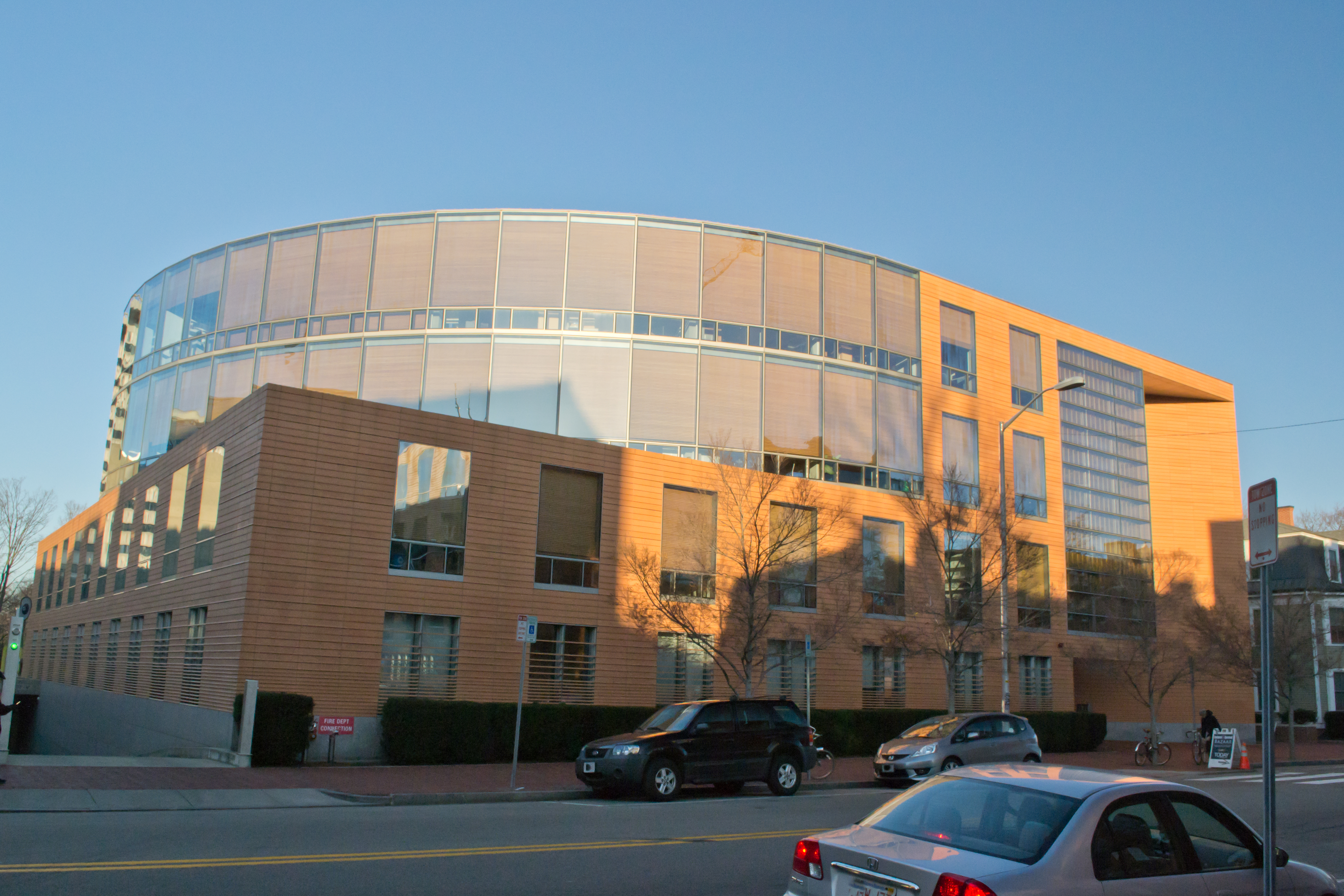
The CGIS Knafel building

The Weatherhead Center for International Affairs (WCFIA), formerly Center for International Affairs (CFIA) is a research center for international affairs and the largest international research center within Harvard University's Faculty of Arts and Sciences. It is sometimes referred to as the Harvard Center for International Affairs.

== History ==
The Center for International Affairs was founded in 1958 by Robert R. Bowie and Henry Kissinger, assuming its current name in 1998 following an endowment by Albert and Celia Weatherhead and the Weatherhead Foundation.

In 1970, a bomb was detonated in the Semitic Museum, which the center was located in at that time, due to the center's connection to Henry Kissinger and its research activities.

=== Program on Nonviolent Sanctions ===
In 1983 the center launched a research division known as the Program on Nonviolent Sanctions in Conflict and Defense (aka Program on Nonviolent Sanctions, or PNS), which operated as a research division under the framework and policies of the center. Its focus was the use of nonviolent sanctions as a substitute for violent interventions. It was founded by Gene Sharp, who also founded the independent non-profit Albert Einstein Institution (AEI) a few months later. PNS provided grants or fellowships for scholars in residence, as well as conducting seminars and conferences. For the first few years, the Program lobbied for its own funding, as well as obtaining some funding from the AEI; after 1987 policy changes were made to reduce confusion and the AEI became solely responsible for raising the funds to support the CFIA Program as well as its own activities.

Some years after Sharp's tenure as director, in 1995 PNS merged with Cultural Survival, a human rights non-profit at Harvard, creating the Program on Nonviolent Sanctions and Cultural Survival (PONSACS). PONSACS operated for ten years before closing in 2005.

== Aims ==
The aim of the center is to confront the world's problems, as diagnosed by its founders in their specification of The Program of the Center for International Affairs (Bowie and Kissinger, 1958):

Foreign affairs in our era pose unprecedented tasks…Today no region is isolated; none can be ignored; actions and events even in remote places may have immediate worldwide impact…vast forces are reshaping the world with headlong speed. Under the impact of wars, nationalism, technology, and communism, the old order has been shattered. Empires have crumbled; nations once dominant are forced to adapt to shrunken influence. New nations have emerged and are struggling to survive…Nowhere do traditional attitudes fit the new realities…Thus notions of sovereignty and independence need revision to apply to a world where a nation's level of life or survival may depend as much on the actions of other countries as on its own…

== Description ==
The center is the located within Harvard University's Center for Government and International Studies. Every year, it hosts approximately fifteen Fellows, at least three of whom are from the three major branches of the United States Armed Forces.

Since 2021, the center has been directed by Melani Cammett. Past directors include Robert R. Bowie (1957–1972), Raymond Vernon (1973–1978), Samuel P. Huntington (1978–1989), Joseph Nye (1989–1992), Robert D. Putnam (1993–1996), Jorge I. Domínguez (1996–2006), Beth A. Simmons (2006–2013), and Michèle Lamont (2015–2021). Simmons served as the center's first female director.

== Current and former scholars ==
- Graham T. Allison
- Robert R. Bowie
- Zbigniew Brzezinski
- Richard N. Cooper
- Robin Fontes
- David Galula (1919–1967) who specialized in the theory and practice of counterinsurgency warfare
- Samuel P. Huntington
- Abraham Katz (1926–2013), diplomat, United States Ambassador to the OECD
- Henry Kissinger
- Joseph Nye
- Robert D. Putnam
- Dani Rodrik
- Kenneth Rogoff
- Dr ALi Khalif Galaydh, former PM of Somalia
- Thomas Schelling
- Timothy Snyder
- Amartya Sen
- Gene Sharp
- Pasi Patokallio

== See also ==
- Harvard Institute for International Development
