= President's Intelligence Advisory Board =

American government office

Advisor overview
- Formed: January 1956
- Jurisdiction: United States
- Advisor executive: Devin Nunes, Chair
- Website: Official website

The President's Intelligence Advisory Board (PIAB) is an advisory body to the Executive Office of the President of the United States. According to its self-description, it "provides advice to the President concerning the quality and adequacy of intelligence collection, of analysis and estimates, of counterintelligence, and of other intelligence activities".

The PIAB, through its Intelligence Oversight Board (IOB), also advises the president on the legality of foreign intelligence activities.

== History ==
In January 1956, President Dwight D. Eisenhower created the agency, originally known as the President's Board of Consultants on Foreign Intelligence Activities (PBCFIA). The first board, under chair James Killian, included the following members:

- Richard Conolly
- Jimmy Doolittle
- Benjamin Fairless
- John Hull
- Joseph P. Kennedy
- Robert Lovett
- Edward Ryerson

In May 1961, President John F. Kennedy renamed it to the President's Foreign Intelligence Advisory Board (PFIAB).

The board exists at the pleasure of the President, who can change its size and portfolio so in 1977 President Jimmy Carter abolished the PFIAB, but President Ronald Reagan re-established it later.

On 29 February 2008, President George W. Bush renamed the agency to President's Intelligence Advisory Board, its present form.

Most of the board's work is classified, but one public investigation involved the loss of U.S. nuclear secrets to China from the Los Alamos National Laboratory during the 1990s.

=== Intelligence Oversight Board ===
President Gerald Ford created the IOB following a 1975–76 investigation by the US Congress into domestic spying, assassination operations, and other abuses by intelligence agencies. His executive order doing so went into effect on 1 March 1976. In 1993, the IOB became a committee of the PFIAB, under Executive Order #12863 of President Bill Clinton.

One of the IOB's functions is to examine violations of the laws and directives governing clandestine surveillance. The IOB received quarterly and annual reports from most US intelligence activities. Thirteen cases involving FBI actions between 2002 and 2004 were referred to the IOB for its review.

In an executive order issued on February 29, 2008, President George W. Bush terminated the IOB's authority to oversee the general counsel and inspector general of each U.S. intelligence agency, and erased the requirement that each inspector general file a report with the IOB every three months. The order also removed the IOB's authority to refer a matter to the Justice Department for a criminal investigation, and directed the IOB to notify the president of a problem only if other officials are not already "adequately" addressing that problem.

In August 2013 it was reported that the membership of the IOB had been reduced from 14 to 4 under President Barack Obama, possibly starting in early May at the beginning of the 2013 mass surveillance disclosures by Edward Snowden.

== Membership ==
During the administration of President George W. Bush, the PIAB had 16 members selected from among distinguished citizens outside the government who were qualified "on the basis of achievement, experience, independence, and integrity." The members were not paid.

PIAB membership is generally considered public information; for example, the Clinton Administration posted the names of the members on a PFIAB web page, and the Trump Administration issued a press release announcing the nominations of new members.

=== George W. Bush ===
In August 2002, Randy Deitering, the executive director of PFIAB, confirmed the membership list released by the White House press office in October 2001:

- Cresencio S. Arcos Jr., AT&T executive and former US ambassador
- Jim Barksdale, former head of the internet company Netscape
- Robert Addison Day, chairman of the TWC Group, a money management firm
- Stephen Friedman, past chairman of Goldman Sachs
- Rita Hauser, lawyer
- Ray Lee Hunt, scion of the Texas oil fortune
- David E. Jeremiah, retired admiral
- Arnold Kanter, national security official in the George H. W. Bush administration and a founding member of the Scowcroft Group
- James C. Langdon Jr., a power-lawyer in Texas
- Alfred Lerner, chief executive of MBNA
- Elisabeth Pate-Cornell, chair of Management Science and Engineering at Stanford University
- Brent Scowcroft, the chair
- John Harrison Streicker, real estate magnate
- Pete Wilson, former governor of California
- Philip Zelikow, National Security Council staffer during the George H.W. Bush administration and later a counselor to Secretary of State Condoleezza Rice

In 2003, there were indications of spying on members of the board by a foreign intelligence asset.

=== Barack Obama ===
The entire PIAB membership that served under the administration of George W. Bush resigned as part of an agreed-upon move in the presidential transition of Barack Obama.

President Obama appointed Chuck Hagel, former United States Senator from Nebraska, and former University of Oklahoma President David Boren as PIAB co-chairs.

The following other members were appointed to the board under President Obama:

- Roel Campos
- Richard Danzig appointed on December 1, 2010
- Lee H. Hamilton
- Rita Hauser
- Paul G. Kaminski
- Ellen Laipson, president and CEO of the Henry L. Stimson Center
- Les Lyles
- Daniel Meltzer appointed on December 1, 2010
- Jami Miscik appointed December 23, 2009
- Mona Sutphen appointed on September 6, 2011
- Tom Wheeler appointed on April 27, 2011
- Philip Zelikow appointed on September 6, 2011

In May 2013, the White House dismissed 10 members of the board. The four remaining members of the PIAB were:

- Richard Danzig
- Daniel Meltzer
- Jami Miscik
- Mona Sutphen

In August 2014, President Obama nominated six new members:

- James S. Crown
- Scott Davis
- Jamie Dos Santos
- Julius Genachowski
- Shirley Ann Jackson
- Neal Wolin

=== Donald Trump (first administration) ===
President Donald Trump named the following persons to the PIAB during his first term in office:

- Safra Catz
- Saxby Chambliss
- Jim Donovan
- Steve Feinberg, chair
- Kevin Hulbert
- Jeremy Katz
- Samantha Ravich, vice chair
- David Robertson

In February 2019, President Trump named three additional members:

- Charles E. Allen
- Daniel Hoffman
- John K. Hurley

In May 2019, President Trump named Ray Washburne as an additional member.

=== Joe Biden ===
In May 2022, President Joe Biden named the below persons to the PIAB.

- Gilman Louie
- Janet Napolitano
- Richard Verma
- Sandy Winnefeld

In June 2022, he named Evan Bayh to the PIAB.

In October 2022, he named Anne Finucane to the PIAB.

In November 2022, he named Mark Angelson to the PIAB.

In January 2023, he named Margaret Hamburg, Kim Cobb, and Kneeland Youngblood to the PIAB.

In March 2023, he named Hamilton E. James and Julia Santucci to the PIAB.

=== Donald Trump (second administration) ===
President Donald Trump named the following persons to the PIAB at the beginning of his second term in office on February 11, 2025:

- Wayne Berman
- Sander R. Gerber
- Scott Glabe
- Thomas Ollis Hicks Jr.
- Jeremy Katz
- Amaryllis Fox Kennedy
- Joshua Lobel
- Katie Miller
- Devin Nunes, chair
- Robert C. O'Brien
- Reince Priebus
- Brad Wenstrup

== PIAB chairs ==
PIAB chairpersons have been:

Officeholder	Term start	Term end	President
James Killian	January 13, 1956	March 1, 1958	Dwight Eisenhower
John Hull	March 1, 1958	January 20, 1961	Dwight Eisenhower
Vacant	January 20, 1961	May 4, 1961	John F. Kennedy
James Killian	May 4, 1961	April 23, 1963	John F. Kennedy
James Killian	May 4, 1961	April 23, 1963	John F. Kennedy Lyndon Johnson
Clark Clifford	April 23, 1963	February 29, 1968	John F. Kennedy Lyndon Johnson
Max Taylor	February 29, 1968	May 1, 1970	John F. Kennedy Lyndon Johnson
Max Taylor	February 29, 1968	May 1, 1970	Richard Nixon
George Anderson	May 1, 1970	March 11, 1976	Richard Nixon
George Anderson	May 1, 1970	March 11, 1976	Gerald Ford
Leo Cherne	March 11, 1976	May 4, 1977	Gerald Ford
Leo Cherne	March 11, 1976	May 4, 1977	Jimmy Carter
Board abolished	May 4, 1977	October 20, 1981	Jimmy Carter
Anne Armstrong	October 20, 1981	July 17, 1990	Ronald Reagan
Anne Armstrong	October 20, 1981	July 17, 1990	George H. W. Bush
John Tower	July 17, 1990	April 5, 1991	George H. W. Bush
Bobby Inman; Acting	April 5, 1991	January 20, 1993	George H. W. Bush
William Crowe	January 20, 1993	May 26, 1994	Bill Clinton
Les Aspin	May 26, 1994	May 21, 1995	Bill Clinton
Warren Rudman; Acting	May 21, 1995	January 16, 1996	Bill Clinton
Tom Foley	January 16, 1996	November 19, 1997	Bill Clinton
Warren Rudman; Acting: 1997–1998	November 19, 1997	October 5, 2001	Bill Clinton
Warren Rudman; Acting: 1997–1998	November 19, 1997	October 5, 2001	George W. Bush
Brent Scowcroft	October 5, 2001	February 25, 2005	George W. Bush
Jim Langdon	February 25, 2005	December 20, 2005	George W. Bush
Steve Friedman	December 20, 2005	October 28, 2009	George W. Bush
Steve Friedman	December 20, 2005	October 28, 2009	Barack Obama
David Boren; Chuck Hagel	October 28, 2009	February 27, 2013	Barack Obama
Vacant	February 27, 2013	August 29, 2014	Barack Obama
Shirley Ann Jackson; Jami Miscik	August 29, 2014	January 20, 2017	Barack Obama
Steve Feinberg	May 12, 2018	January 20, 2021	Donald Trump
Sandy Winnefeld	May 4, 2022	January 20, 2025	Joe Biden
Devin Nunes	January 20, 2025	Present	Donald Trump

== IOB chairs ==
These are chairs of the Advisory Board's committee of Intelligence Oversight Board

Officeholder	Term start	Term end	President
Robert Murphy	March 11, 1976	May 5, 1977	Gerald Ford
Robert Murphy	March 11, 1976	May 5, 1977	Jimmy Carter
Thomas Farmer	May 5, 1977	October 20, 1981	Jimmy Carter
Thomas Farmer	May 5, 1977	October 20, 1981	Ronald Reagan
Glenn Campbell	October 20, 1981	February 26, 1990	Ronald Reagan
Glenn Campbell	October 20, 1981	February 26, 1990	George H. W. Bush
Jim Thompson	February 26, 1990	January 20, 1993	George H. W. Bush
William Crowe	January 20, 1993	May 26, 1994	Bill Clinton
Anthony Harrington	May 26, 1994	February 8, 2000	Bill Clinton
Warren Rudman; Acting	February 8, 2000	October 5, 2001	Bill Clinton
Warren Rudman; Acting	February 8, 2000	October 5, 2001	George W. Bush
Brent Scowcroft	October 5, 2001	February 25, 2005	George W. Bush
Jim Langdon	February 25, 2005	December 20, 2005	George W. Bush
Steve Friedman	December 20, 2005	October 28, 2009	George W. Bush
Steve Friedman	December 20, 2005	October 28, 2009	Barack Obama
Chuck Hagel	October 28, 2009	February 27, 2013	Barack Obama
Dan Meltzer	February 27, 2013	May 24, 2015	Barack Obama
Neal Wolin	May 24, 2015	January 20, 2017	Barack Obama
Steve Feinberg	August 16, 2018	January 20, 2021	Donald Trump

== Board executive directors ==
- 1956–1959: John Cassidy
- 1959–1961, 1961–1970: Patrick Coyne
- 1970–1973: Gerard Burke
- 1973–1977: Wheaton Byers
- 1977: Lionel Olmer
- 1977–1981: Board abolished
- 1981–1983: Norman Wood
- 1983–1984: Fred Demech
- 1984–1988: Gary Schmitt
- 1988–1989: Fred Demech
- 1989–1991: Nina Stewart
- 1991–1992: Vacant
- 1992–1995: Eugene Yeates
- 1995–2003: Randy Deitering (Acting: 1995–1998)
- 2003–2005: Joan Dempsey
- 2005–2017: Stefanie Osburn

== Board members ==
- David Abshire: 1981–1983
- Stephen Ailes: 1976–1977 (IOB)
- Lew Allen: 1990–1999 (IOB)
- Brooke Anderson: 2015–present
- George Anderson: 1969–1970; 1976–1977
- Martin Anderson: 1982–1985
- Cresencio Arcos: 1999–2003
- Leslie Arends: 1976–1977
- Anne Legendre Armstrong: 1981–1990, Chairman
- Zoë Baird: 1993–2001
- Howard Baker: 1985–1987; 1988–1990
- William Baker: 1959–1961; 1961–1977; 1981–1990
- Jim Barksdale: 2001–2009
- Robert Barrow: 1984–1985
- Richard Bloch: 1996–1998
- Alfred Bloomingdale: 1981–1982
- David Boren: 2009–2013 (IOB)
- Frank Borman: 1981–1982
- Denis Bovin: 2006–2010
- Omar Bradley: 1956
- William Brody: 2002–2005
- David Bruce: 1956–1957
- Shelby Bryan: 1999–2001
- Zbigniew Brzezinski: 1988–1990
- Glenn Campbell: 1981–1990 (IOB)
- Roel Campos: 2009–2013
- Ann Caracristi: 1993–2001 (IOB)
- Bill Casey: 1976–1977
- Leo Cherne: 1973–1976 (IOB, 1976–1977); Vice Chair, 1981–1990
- Clark Clifford: 1961–1963
- John Connally: 1970–1971; 1972–1975; 1976–1977; 1981–1983
- Richard Conolly: 1956–1961
- Jim Crown: 2014–present
- Arthur Culvahouse: 2005–2010
- Richard Danzig: 2010–present (IOB, 2010–2015)
- Colgate Darden: 1957–1961
- Scott Davis: 2014–2015
- Robert Day: 2001–2005
- John Deutch: 1990–1993
- William DeWitt: 2005–2010
- Jimmy Doolittle: 1956–1961; 1961–1964
- Jamie Dos Santos: 2014–present
- Sidney Drell: 1993–2001
- Thomas Eagleton: 1993–2000
- James Ellis: 2005–2009
- Donald Evans: 2005–2009
- Martin Faga: 2005–2009
- Benjamin Fairless: 1956–1959
- Marty Feldstein: 2006–2009
- Michèle Flournoy: 2014–present
- John Foster: 1973–1977; 1981–1990
- Steve Friedman: 1999–2005; 2009–2010
- Bob Galvin: 1973–1977
- Julius Genachowski: 2014–present (IOB)
- Al Gore: 1977–1981 (IOB)
- Gordon Gray: 1961–1977
- Alan Greenspan: 1982–1985
- James Hamilton: 1995–1997
- Lee Hamilton: 2005–2013
- Anthony Harrington: 1993–2000 (IOB); Vice Chair, 1997–2000
- Rita Hauser: 2001–2004 (IOB, 2003–2004); 2009–2013
- Robert Hermann: 1993–2001
- John Hull: 1956–1958
- Ray Hunt: 2001–2009
- William Hyland: 1990–1993
- Bobby Inman: Vice Chair, 1990–1991
- Leon Jaworski: 1981–1982
- Shirley Jackson: 2014–present (IOB)
- David Jeremiah: 2001–2010 (IOB, 2003–2009)
- Amos Jordan: 1990–1993 (IOB, not PIAB)
- Paul Kaminski: 2009–2013
- Arnold Kanter: 2001–2005 (IOB, 2003–2005)
- Amaryllis Fox Kennedy: 2025–present
- Joe Kennedy: 1956
- James Killian: 1958–1960
- Jeane Kirkpatrick: 1985–1990
- Henry Kissinger: 1984–1990
- Ellen Laipson: 2009–2013
- Edwin Land: 1961–1977
- Jim Langdon: 2001–2005 (IOB, 2003–2005)
- William Langer: 1961–1969
- Tony Lapham: 1991–1993 (IOB; not PIAB)
- Lyman Lemnitzer: 1976–1977
- Al Lerner: 2001–2002
- Franklin Lincoln: 1969–1972
- Robert Lovett: 1956–1961
- Clare Luce: 1973–1977; 1981–1987
- Gordon Luce: 1988–1989
- Lester Lyles: 2009–2013 (IOB)
- Michael McConnell: 1988–1990 (IOB; not PIAB)
- Dan Meltzer: 2010–2015 (IOB)
- Charles Meyers: 1982–1988 (IOB; not PIAB)
- Jami Miscik: 2009–2015 (IOB)
- Thomas Moorer: 1981–1985
- Michael Morell: 2013–2014
- John Morrison: 2005–2010
- Franklin Murphy: 1969–1972
- Robert Murphy: 1961–1973; 1976–1977 (IOB)
- Kevin Nealer: 2014–present
- Peter O'Donnell: 1981–1985
- Frank Pace: 1961–1972
- Elisabeth Paté-Cornell: 2001–2010
- Ross Perot: 1981–1985
- William Perry: 1990–1993
- Hal Pote: 1993–1996 (IOB)
- Lois Rice: 1993–2001
- Chuck Robb: 2005–2009
- Nelson Rockefeller: 1969–1974
- Joe Rodgers: 1981–1985
- Eugene Rostow: 1982–1985
- Warren Rudman: Vice Chair, 1993–1994; Vice Chair, 1995–1998
- Edward Ryerson: 1956–1961
- Jack Schmitt: 1983–1985
- Bernie Schriever: 1985–1990
- Paul Seabury: 1981–1985
- Bill Scranton: 1977–1981 (IOB)
- George Shultz: 1974–1976
- Stanley Shuman: 1995–2001
- John Sides: 1965–1969
- Robert Six: 1981–1985
- William Smith: 1985–1990
- Maurice Sonnenberg: 1992–2000
- Frank Stella: 1981–1982 (IOB; not PIAB)
- Bobby Stein: 2015–present
- John Streicker: 2001–2005
- Mona Sutphen: 2011–present (IOB)
- Max Taylor: 1961; 1965–1968
- Edward Teller: 1971–1977
- John Tower: 1987–1990
- Fran Townsend: 2008–2009
- Charles Tyroler: 1981–1990 (IOB; not PIAB)
- Caspar Weinberger: 1988–1990
- Seymour Weiss: 1981–1985
- Brad Wenstrup: 2025-
- Tom Wheeler: 2011–2013
- Bud Wheelon: 1983–1988
- Ed Williams: 1976–1977; 1981–1985
- James Wilson: 1985–1990
- Pete Wilson: 2001–2005
- Albert Wohlstetter: 1985–1990
- Neal Wolin: 2014–present (IOB)
- Philip Zelikow: 2001–2003; 2011–2013
- Bud Zumwalt: 1996–2000

== See also ==
- Team B
- Privacy and Civil Liberties Oversight Board
- Civil Liberties Protection Officer (ODNI CLPO)
