= Stephen Friedman (economist) =

American businessman and politician (b. 1937)

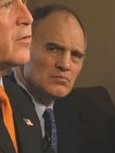

Chair of the President's Intelligence Advisory Board
- In office December 20, 2004 – October 28, 2009
- President: George W. Bush; Barack Obama
- Preceded by: Jim Langdon
- Succeeded by: Chuck Hagel; David Boren

5th Director of the National Economic Council
- In office December 12, 2002 – January 10, 2004
- President: George W. Bush
- Preceded by: Larry Lindsey
- Succeeded by: Al Hubbard

Personal details
- Born: December 21, 1937 (age 88) New York City, U.S.
- Party: Republican
- Spouse: Barbara Benioff
- Children: 3, including David
- Relatives: Amanda Peet (daughter-in-law)
- Education: Cornell University (BA); Columbia University (JD)

Stephen Friedman (born December 21, 1937) is an American economist. He is a former chairman of the U.S. President's Intelligence Advisory Board, the Federal Reserve Bank of New York, and Goldman Sachs. He was nominated on October 27, 2004, to replace Brent Scowcroft in the position. The Friedman Wrestling Center and the Friedman Strength and Conditioning Center at Cornell University are named after him.

== Early life and education ==
Friedman was born in New York City, to a Jewish family. He received his BA from Cornell University in 1959 and his Juris Doctor degree from Columbia University Law School in 1962. At Cornell he was a member of the Quill and Dagger society and champion wrestler. At Columbia he was on the Law Review.

== Career ==
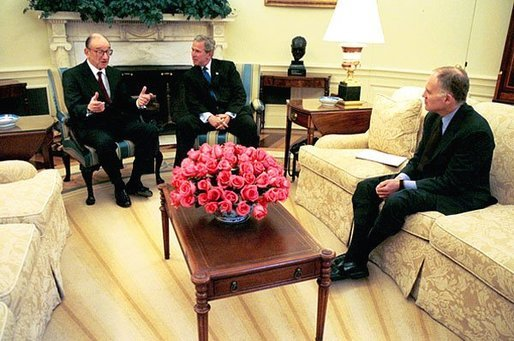
Friedman (right) with President George W. Bush and Alan Greenspan in 2004

In 1966, Friedman joined Goldman Sachs and became a partner in 1973. From 1987 until November 1990 he was the co-chief operating officer and either co-chairman or chairman between 1990 and 1994. Friedman re-joined the board of Goldman in April 2005, and stepped down from serving on the board on May 22, 2013.

In 1998, Friedman joined Stone Point Capital LLC. He also served as Senior Advisor at Crestview Partners, LP and a Special Limited Partner and Member of the Executive Advisory Board of Insight Partners.

From 1998 to 2002, he served as a senior principal of Marsh & McLennan Capital Corp. In March 1999 President Clinton announced his intention to appoint Friedman and Crescencio S. Arcos to serve as Members of the President's Intelligence Advisory Board.

From December 2002 to December 2004, Friedman was United States Assistant to President George W. Bush for Economic Policy as well as the director of the National Economic Council. On October 27, 2005 Friedman was asked to replace Brent Scowcroft as the Chairman of the President’s Foreign Intelligence Advisory Board.

== Chairman of New York Federal Reserve Bank ==
Friedman was the Chairman of the New York Federal Reserve Bank, a body which implements the Wall Street policies of the Federal Reserve, during a period of immense financial market upheaval, from January 2008 until May 7, 2009. When Goldman Sachs was converted to a bank holding company in September 2008 the bank then came under the regulatory authority of the New York Fed, which made Friedman’s position as a member of Goldman Sachs’ board a violation of Federal Reserve policy. At the time of the conversion Friedman requested a waiver from this violation, which was granted about 10 weeks later.

On May 7, 2009, Friedman resigned as Chairman of the Federal Reserve Bank of New York. In his letter of resignation Friedman explains why: ‘Last Fall, after Goldman Sachs Group, Inc. became a bank holding company, I agreed to remain on the Board, pursuant to the waiver authority of the Board of Governors of the Federal Reserve System, to provide continuity during a time of financial market instability. Today, although I have been in compliance with the rules, my public service motivated continuation on the Reserve Bank Board is being mis-characterized as improper. The Federal Reserve System has important work to do and does not need this distraction.’

Friedman was criticized for seemingly benefiting from his role as Chair of the New York Fed branch due to the federal government's aid to Goldman Sachs in recent months. He had "remain[ed] on the board of Goldman even as he was supposedly regulating [Goldman]; in order to rectify the problem, he applied for, and got, a conflict of interest waiver from the government. Friedman was also supposed to divest himself of his Goldman stock after Goldman became a bankholding company, but thanks to the waiver, he was allowed to go out and buy 52,000 additional shares in his old bank, leaving him $3 million richer," as one report put it. Friedman's resignation announcement came within an hour of the government's release of the 2009 stress tests for 19 U.S. financial institutions.

== Public service ==
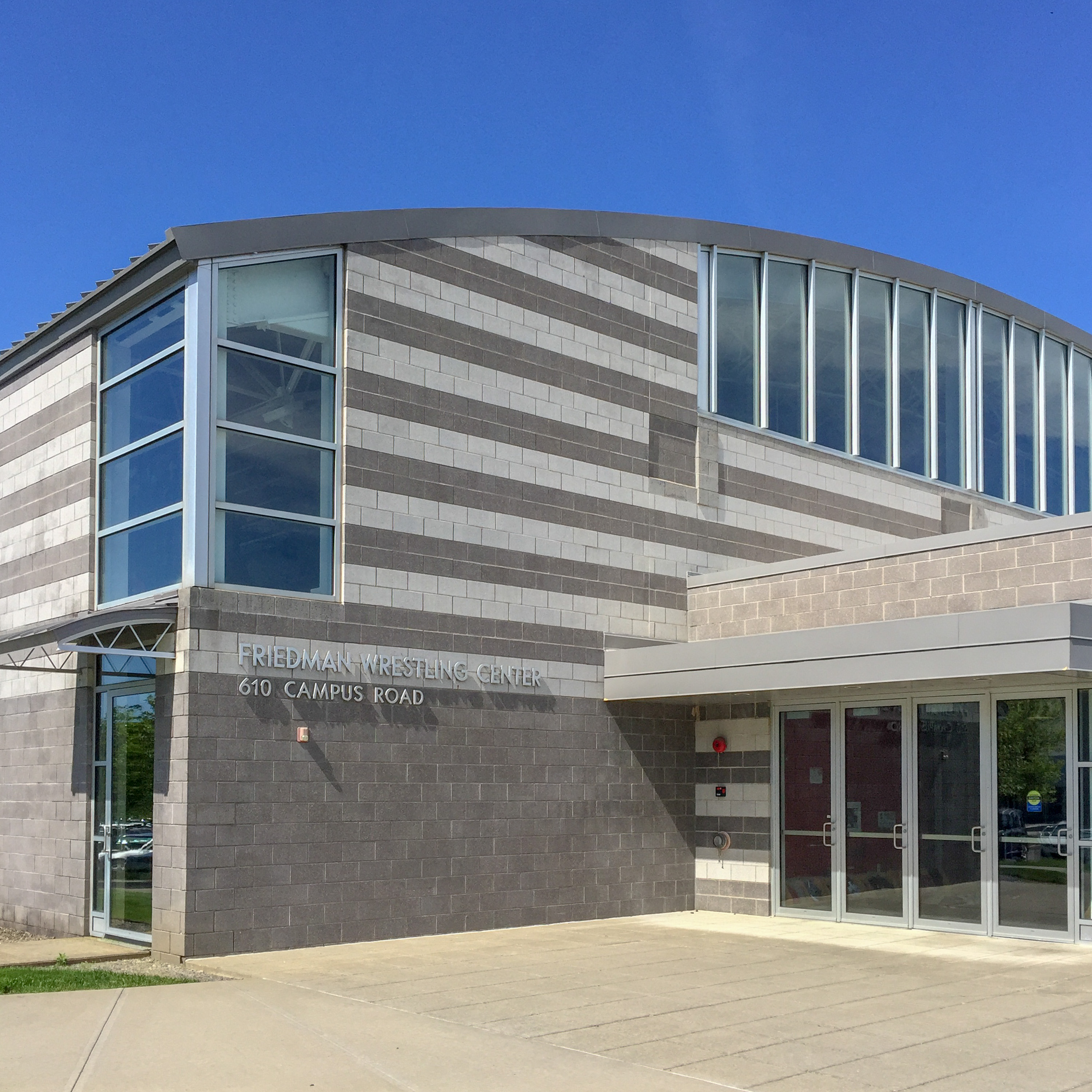
Friedman Wrestling Center at Cornell University

Friedman is involved in several public service activities, including Chairman Emeritus of the Board of Columbia University, Chairman Emeritus of the Executive Committee of the Brookings Institution, and a member of the Council on Foreign Relations. He is also a benefactor of his alma mater Cornell University, particularly its wrestling program as the college's wrestling building is known as the Friedman Center.

== Personal life ==
Stephen Friedman is married to Barbara Benioff, chairwoman of the board of governors of Hebrew Union College. The couple live on Fifth Avenue in Manhattan, and have three children: two daughters, Susan and Caroline, and a son, David Benioff. Benioff, who goes by his mother's maiden name, is a writer, screenwriter and adaptor of Game of Thrones. David is married to actress Amanda Peet.

Business positions
Preceded by Robert Rubin	Chair and Chief Executive Officer of Goldman Sachs; 1992–1994	Succeeded by Jon Corzine
Political offices
Preceded by Larry Lindsey	Director of the National Economic Council; 2002–2005	Succeeded by Al Hubbard
Government offices
Preceded by Jim Langdon	Chair of the President's Intelligence Advisory Board; 2005–2009	Succeeded by David Boren
Preceded by Jim Langdon	Chair of the President's Intelligence Advisory Board; 2005–2009	Succeeded by Chuck Hagel
Preceded by Jim Langdon	Chair of the Intelligence Oversight Board; 2005–2009	Succeeded by Chuck Hagel
