= Marc Sumerlin =

American economist

Personal details
- Born: January 29, 1970 (age 56)
- Party: Republican
- Spouse: Cassandra Hanley
- Children: 2
- Education: Georgetown University (BS); Duke University (MPP); Johns Hopkins University (MA)

Marc Sumerlin (born January 29, 1970) is an American economist. He was Deputy Assistant to the President for Economic Policy and Deputy Director of the National Economic Council under George W. Bush. He played a lead role in the development and passage of the Economic Growth and Tax Relief Reconciliation Act and the Sarbanes-Oxley Act, as well as the economic response to 9/11. He also worked as an economic policy advisor for the Bush for President campaign, after starting his career at the U.S. Senate Budget Committee.

In 2003, he co-founded the Lindsey Group with Lawrence Lindsey.

In 2009, he testified before the Congressional Oversight Panel on the origins of the 2008 financial crisis.

In 2013, he founded a global economic consulting firm Evenflow Macro, where he is the Managing Partner.

In 2018, he declined an approach to be President Trump's nominee to the Federal Reserve Board.

In August 2025, he was added to a list of candidates under consideration to succeed Jerome Powell as Chair of the Federal Reserve, and was subsequently interviewed by Treasury Secretary Scott Bessent for the role.

He serves on the Board of Governors at the Johns Hopkins Wilmer Eye Institute. Also, a member of Treasury's Financial Research Advisory Committee.

== Early life and education ==
Marc Sumerlin was born in New Orleans, Louisiana, and grew up in Houston, Texas. He graduated from Kinkaid High School in 1988. In 2008, he received Kinkaid's Distinguished Young Alumni award. He later graduated from Georgetown University with a Bachelor of Science in business administration (magna cum laude), Duke University with Master in Public Policy (Senator Jacob Javits Fellow), and from Johns Hopkins University with a Master in Applied Economics.

== Books ==
Co-author, What a President Should Know: An Insider's View on How to Succeed in the Oval Office (ISBN 9780742562226)
