= The Dark Path =

The Dark Path may refer to:

- The Dark Path (Hunt novel), a novel by Walter H. Hunt
- The Dark Path (McIntee novel), a novel by David A. McIntee, based on the television series Doctor Who

== See also ==
- Paths of Darkness, a series of novels
