= James Langdon =

James Langdon may refer to:

- James C. Langdon Jr. (born 1945), American attorney and former government official
- James Langdon Jr. (born 1938), member of the North Carolina General Assembly
