= Darkwing =

Darkwing may refer to:

- Darkwing (novel), a novel by Kenneth Oppel
- The Dark Wing, a 2001 science fiction novel by Walter H. Hunt
- Darkwing Duck, Disney cartoon character
- Darkwing, a fictional bat monster associated with Kamen Rider Knight
- Darkwing, a fictional superhero, member of the Guardians of the Globe in the Invincible franchise
- Darkwing, a character from The Transformers
