= Warren Rudman =

American politician (1930–2012)

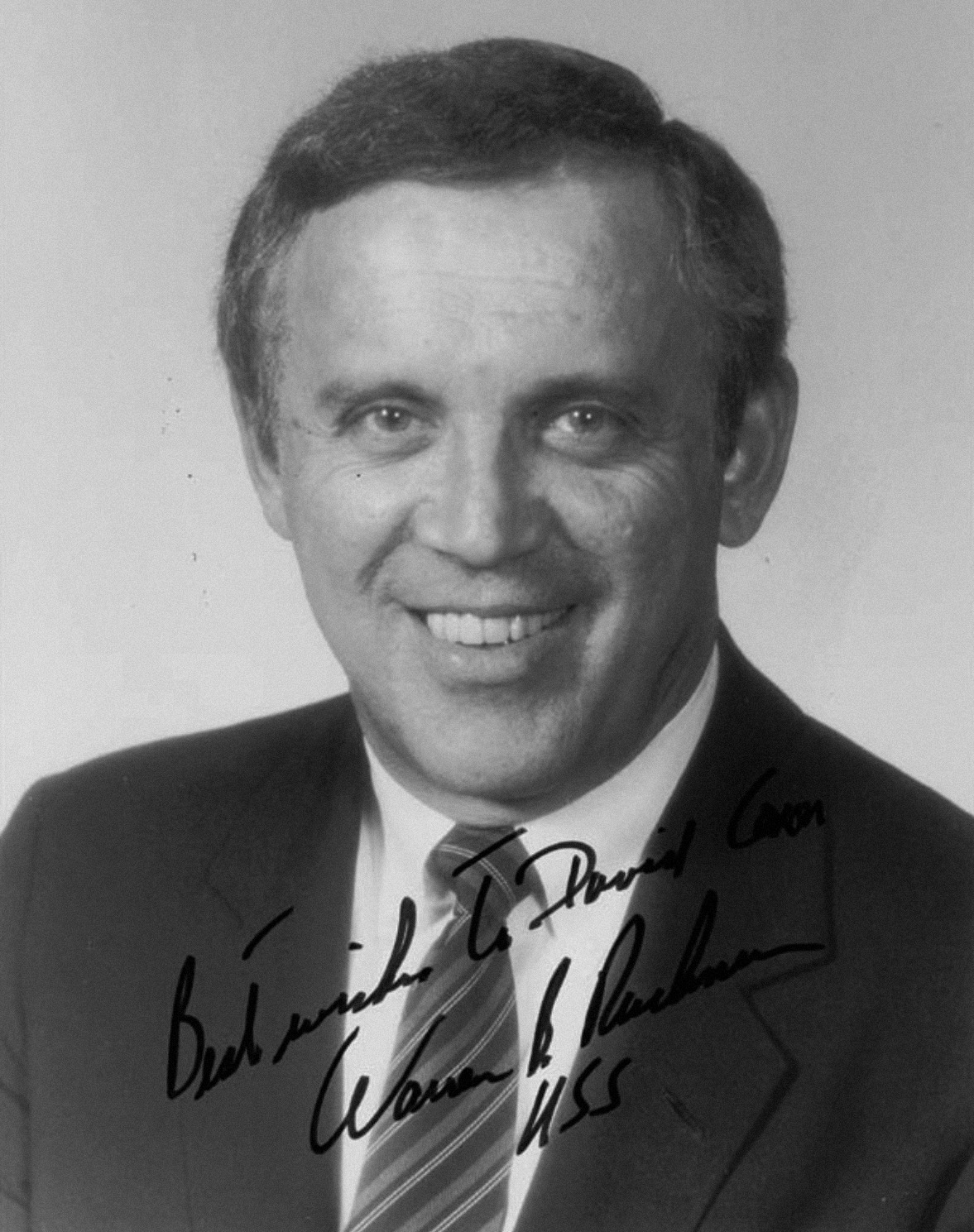
- Rudman in 1980

Chair of the Intelligence Oversight Board
- Acting; February 8, 2000 – October 5, 2001
- President: Bill Clinton; George W. Bush
- Preceded by: Anthony Harrington
- Succeeded by: Brent Scowcroft

Chair of the President's Intelligence Advisory Board
- In office February 18, 1998 – October 5, 2001; Acting: November 19, 1997 – February 18, 1998
- President: Bill Clinton; George W. Bush
- Preceded by: Tom Foley
- Succeeded by: Brent Scowcroft
- Acting; May 21, 1995 – January 16, 1996
- President: Bill Clinton
- Preceded by: Les Aspin
- Succeeded by: Tom Foley

United States Senator from New Hampshire
- In office December 29, 1980 – January 3, 1993
- Preceded by: John Durkin
- Succeeded by: Judd Gregg

19th Attorney General of New Hampshire
- In office December 3, 1970 – July 17, 1976
- Governor: Walter Peterson; Meldrim Thomson
- Preceded by: George S. Pappagianis
- Succeeded by: David Souter

Personal details
- Born: Warren Bruce Rudman; May 18, 1930 Boston, Massachusetts, U.S.
- Died: November 19, 2012 (aged 82) Washington, D.C., U.S.
- Party: Republican
- Spouse(s): Shirley Wahl (died 2010); Margaret Shean
- Children: 3
- Education: Syracuse University (BA); Boston College Law School (JD)

Military service
- Allegiance: United States
- Branch/service: United States Army
- Years of service: 1952–1954
- Rank: Captain
- Battles/wars: Korean War
- Awards: Bronze Star
- Warren Rudman's voice Rudman, as vice chairman of the Senate Iran–Contra Committee, delivers his opening statement on the first day of joint hearings Recorded May 5, 1987

Warren Bruce Rudman (May 18, 1930 – November 19, 2012) was an American attorney and politician who served as a United States senator from New Hampshire from 1980 to 1993. A member of the Republican Party, he was known as a moderate centrist, to such an extent that President Clinton approached him in 1994 about replacing departing Treasury Secretary Lloyd Bentsen in Clinton's cabinet, an offer that Rudman declined.

After two terms in office, Rudman chose not to run for re-election in 1992. At the time of his death, he was a co-chair of Albright Stonebridge Group, a retired partner in the international law firm Paul, Weiss, Rifkind, Wharton & Garrison, as well as an advisory board member of Promontory Financial Group. He previously sat on the board of directors of Raytheon, Collins & Aikman, Allied Waste, Boston Scientific and a number of funds in the Dreyfus Family of Funds.

== Early life and education ==
Rudman was born in Boston on May 18, 1930, the son of Theresa (née Levenson) and Edward G. Rudman. His family were Jewish immigrants from Germany, Poland, and Russia. He grew up in Nashua, New Hampshire, and lived his entire life in the state, with few exceptions. He attended the Valley Forge Military Academy boarding school in Wayne, Pennsylvania. He received his undergraduate degree from Syracuse University, and served in the United States Army during the Korean War. He received his J.D. degree from Boston College Law School in 1960, and was appointed Attorney General of New Hampshire in 1970; serving in that capacity until 1976.

== Career ==
From 2004 to 2006, Rudman led a team of attorneys that investigated accounting practices at Fannie Mae.

Prior to the September 11 attacks, Rudman had served on a now oft-cited national panel investigating the threat of international terrorism. He, along with fellow former Senator Gary Hart (D-CO), chaired the panel, and both Rudman and Hart have been lauded since September 11 for their prescient conclusions.

Rudman was an Advisory Board member and Co-Chair of the Partnership for a Secure America, a not-for-profit organization dedicated to recreating the bipartisan center in American national security and foreign policy.

Rudman was one of the few Jewish politicians elected in New Hampshire. He spent his final years as a resident of Hollis, New Hampshire, a suburb of Nashua.

He was the author of a memoir called Combat.

== United States Senator ==
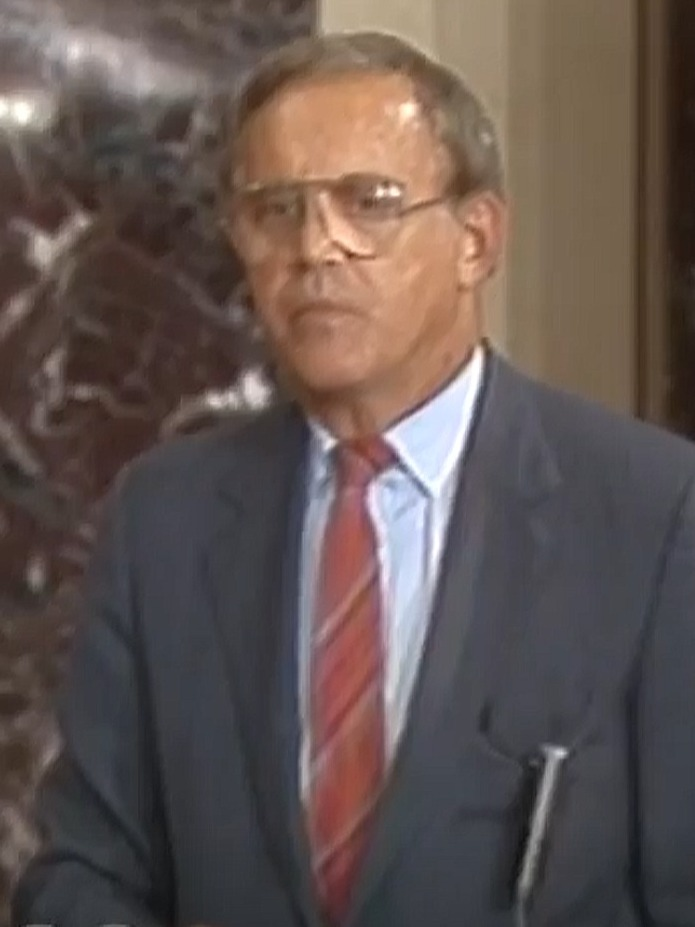
Rudman on the Senate floor, 1986

Rudman defeated Democratic incumbent John Durkin in the 1980 election, riding the wave of Ronald Reagan's landslide victory. Durkin resigned and Governor Hugh Gallen appointed Rudman to fill the vacancy in late December 1980. Rudman served on the Senate Appropriations Committee and the Ethics Committee. His best-known legislative effort was the Gramm-Rudman-Hollings Act.

A moderate Republican, Rudman was conservative on matters of fiscal and defense policy—favoring tax cuts, reduced domestic spending, and higher military spending, but liberal on social issues—supporting a woman's right to choose to have an abortion, gay rights, and opposing a constitutional amendment mandating voluntary school prayer. Rudman, along with John H. Sununu, was a key player in the appointment of Rudman's personal friend, Supreme Court Justice David Souter, to both the First Circuit Court of Appeals and the Supreme Court. The Wall Street Journal later editorialized about the appointment, saying: "Rudman, the man who helped put liberal jurist David Souter on the high court" and who in his "Yankee Republican liberalism" took "pride in recounting how he sold Mr. Souter to gullible White House chief of staff John Sununu as a confirmable conservative. Then they both sold the judge to President Bush, who wanted above all else to avoid a confirmation battle." Rudman wrote in his memoir that he had "suspected all along" that Souter would not "overturn activist liberal precedents." Sununu later said of Rudman, "In spite of it all, he's a good friend. But I've always known that he was more liberal than he liked the world to think he was."

=== Post-Senate years ===
After leaving the Senate, Rudman continued to practice law and be an active member in national politics. Senator John McCain asked Rudman to serve as his campaign chair during McCain's 2000 presidential campaign. On January 8, 2001, he was presented with the Presidential Citizens Medal by President Clinton.

He was twice considered as a possible vice presidential candidate on the ticket of two parties other than the GOP. In 1996, Ross Perot offered Rudman the slot to be his vice presidential running mate on the Reform Party ticket, but Rudman refused (as did former Democratic Senator David Boren of Oklahoma). Perot eventually selected Pat Choate. In 2004, Rudman was mentioned as possible running mate for Democratic nominee John Kerry. Kerry eventually selected John Edwards.

In 1999, a leaked report by the U.S. National Drug Intelligence Center (NDIC) stated that Carlos Hank González, a Mexican criminal, politician and influential businessman, and his two sons are so involved in drug trafficking and money laundering that they "pose a significant criminal threat to the United States." After the report was disclosed, the Hank family mobilized to rebut the allegations, hiring high-profile lawyers including Rudman. Rudman was an attorney with the law firm Paul, Weiss, Rifkind, Wharton & Garrison, and represented Hank Gonzalez's oldest son, Carlos Hank Rhon.

Rudman lobbied the government to disavow the report and in March 2000 Attorney General Janet Reno wrote a letter that said the report "was beyond the substantive expertise and area of responsibility of the NDIC.″ At Rudman's request, a copy of Reno's letter was sent to Federal Reserve Board Chairman Alan Greenspan because of the Hank family's banking interests in the United States. Carlos Hank Rhon was later fined $40 million to settle charges that he violated banking laws when he bought Laredo National Bancshares in Texas and failed to disclose the sale of a $20 million share in Laredo National to his father.

He was a co-chair, along with former Secretary of State Madeleine Albright and former National Security Advisor Sandy Berger, of Albright Stonebridge Group, a global business consulting and strategy firm based in Washington, D.C.

He died of lymphoma in Washington on November 19, 2012, only a month after Durkin. In a statement, President Barack Obama memorialized Rudman as "an early advocate for fiscal responsibility".

== See also ==
- U.S. Commission on National Security/21st Century (Hart-Rudman Commission)
- List of Jewish American jurists
- List of Jewish members of the United States Congress

Legal offices
Preceded by George Pappagiannis	Attorney General of New Hampshire; 1970–1976	Succeeded by David Souter
Party political offices
Preceded by Louis Wyman	Republican nominee for U.S. Senator from New Hampshire (Class 3); 1980, 1986	Succeeded by Judd Gregg
U.S. Senate
Preceded by John Durkin	United States Senator (Class 3) from New Hampshire; 1980–1993; Served alongside: Gordon Humphrey, Robert Smith	Succeeded by Judd Gregg
Preceded by Ted Stevens	Chair of the Senate Ethics Committee; 1985–1987	Succeeded by Howell Heflin
Political offices
Preceded by Les Aspin	Chair of the President's Intelligence Advisory Board; Acting; 1995–1996	Succeeded by Tom Foley
Preceded by Tom Foley	Chair of the President's Intelligence Advisory Board; 1997–2001	Succeeded by Brent Scowcroft
Preceded by Anthony Harrington	Chair of the Intelligence Oversight Board; Acting; 2000–2001	Succeeded by Brent Scowcroft
