= Jeremy Katz =

American public official

Jeremy L. Katz is an American public official who has held multiple roles in the U.S. government.

== Early life and education ==
Katz is a graduate of the University of Pennsylvania and the Stanford University School of Business.

== Career ==
From 2001 to 2004, Katz served in the George W. Bush administration at the U.S. Department of Commerce as a senior policy advisor. From 2005 to 2008 he worked in the Office of the White House Chief of Staff as a special assistant to the president for policy, working under Andrew Card and Joshua Bolten.

During the first Trump administration, Katz served on the President's Intelligence Advisory Board, reporting to the president on classified activies.

Katz joined a hedge fund as CEO in 2018. In 2022, he joined the advisory board for the Center for a New American Security (CNAS).

In 2025, President Trump again nominated Katz to the President's Intelligence Advisory Board.
