= Joshua Lobel =

Joshua "Josh" Lobel is an American businessman and Republican political donor. Since 2025 he has advised President Donald J. Trump on classified matters as a member of the President's Intelligence Advisory Board.

== Early life and education ==
Lobel graduated from the University of Pennsylvania.

== Career and political activity ==
Lobel is the CEO of M-Cor Holdings.

Lobel and his wife contributed more than $1.5 million to Trump-affiliated political groups in 2024.

In January 2025, Lobel donated $250,000 to MAGA, Inc, President Trump's political action committee. In February 2025, President Trump named Lobel to the President's Intelligence Advisory Board.

Lobel is on the board of directors of the CIA Officers Memorial Foundation. He is also an advisory board member for the Center for Global Risk and Security at RAND and serves on Wharton's Graduate Executive Board.
