= Daniel Meltzer =

American lawyer and law professor (1951-2015)

Dan Meltzer

Chair of the Intelligence Oversight Board
- In office February 27, 2013 – May 24, 2015
- President: Barack Obama
- Preceded by: Chuck Hagel
- Succeeded by: Neal Wolin

Personal details
- Born: December 17, 1951 Chicago, Illinois, U.S.
- Died: May 24, 2015 (aged 63) Boston, Massachusetts, U.S.
- Party: Democratic
- Education: Harvard University (BA, JD)

Daniel Julius Meltzer (December 17, 1951 – May 24, 2015) was an American lawyer and law professor who taught at Harvard Law School. He worked in the Obama Administration as Principal Deputy Counsel from January 2009 through June 1, 2010.

== Early life and education ==
Daniel Julius Meltzer was born in Chicago on December 17, 1951. His father was Bernard Meltzer, who served as a law professor at the University of Chicago and as a prosecutor at the Nuremberg trials. Daniel Meltzer's uncle was Edward H. Levi, who served as United States Attorney General under Gerald Ford and as president of the University of Chicago (1968–1975).

Meltzer received an A.B. in economics from Harvard University in 1972, and a J.D. from Harvard Law School, where he was president of the Harvard Law Review, in 1975.

== Legal career ==
Upon graduation, he clerked first for Judge Carl E. McGowan of the United States Court of Appeals for the District of Columbia Circuit, and then for Justice Potter Stewart of the United States Supreme Court. From 1977 to 1978, Meltzer was Special Assistant to the Secretary of the Department of Health, Education, and Welfare, Joseph Califano Jr. Thereafter he worked three years in private practice with the District of Columbia firm of Williams & Connolly.

Meltzer joined the Harvard Law School faculty in 1982 as assistant professor, was promoted to full professor in 1987, served as associate dean 1989–93, was named the Story Professor of Law in 1998, and the vice dean for physical planning in 2003.

Meltzer co-authored several books on the federal court system, habeas corpus, and other subjects with Richard Fallon and David L. Shapiro. Criminal procedure was another of his specializations.

In 1989, Meltzer was elected to the American Law Institute and was elected to the ALI Council in 1999. In January 2013, Meltzer was selected to succeed Lance Liebman as ALI Director. Meltzer later declined the appointment for health reasons.

== White House appointment ==
Meltzer was appointed Principal Deputy Counsel to President Barack Obama in January 2009, deputy to Counsel Greg Craig. Meltzer had originally agreed to serve in the position for one year but agreed to stay longer to help in the transition from Craig to Robert Bauer early in 2010. Returning to Harvard in mid-2010 allowed Meltzer to resume his faculty position within the preferred two-year leave tenure. At the time of his resignation, his service for the administration was noted for efforts to close the military prison at Guantanamo Bay, Cuba, related policies affecting terrorism detainees, anti-abortion issues in the health care reform debate, and preparation of Supreme Court Associate Justice Sonia Sotomayor in her 2009 confirmation hearings. Also noted was close work during his tenure with the acting leader of the Office of Legal Counsel, David J. Barron (also a fellow Harvard law professor), and with United States Associate Attorney General Thomas J. Perrelli, both in the Department of Justice.

== Personal life ==
Meltzer died on May 24, 2015, from cancer. Meltzer was married for 34 years to Ellen Semonoff, the Assistant City Manager of Human Services for the City of Cambridge, MA. They had two sons. Semonoff did not move to Washington during the 2009-2010 appointment, and Meltzer commuted to Cambridge during the period.

Meltzer's cousin was David F. Levi, dean of Duke Law School. His son, Jonathan Meltzer, was a 2014 Bristow Fellow and clerked for Justice Elena Kagan on the Supreme Court in 2015.

== See also ==
- List of law clerks for the eighth seat of the Supreme Court of the United States

Government offices
Preceded by Chuck Hagel	Chair of the Intelligence Oversight Board; 2013–2015	Succeeded by Neal Wolin
