= William J. Crowe =

American admiral and diplomat (1925–2007)

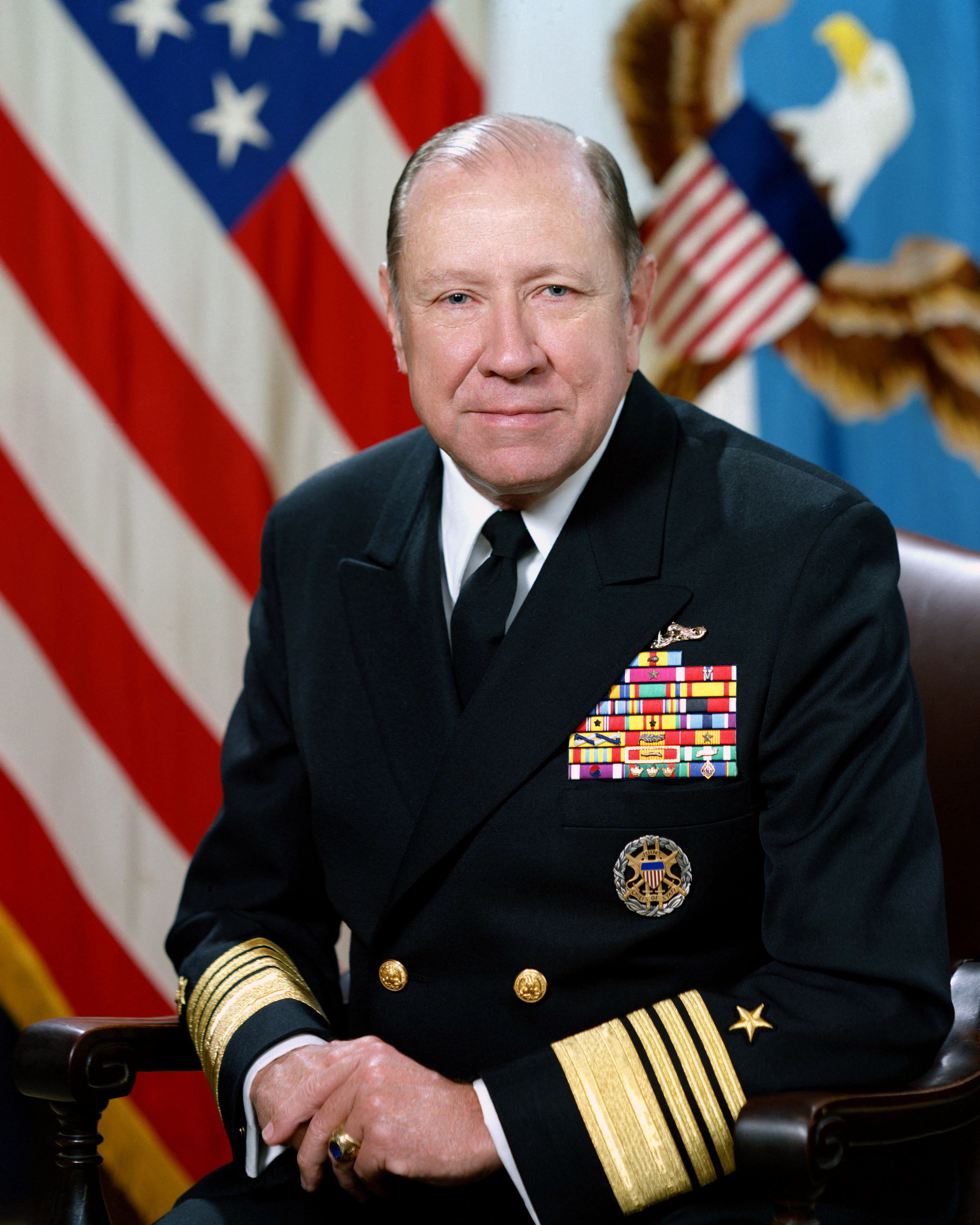
- Official portrait, 1985

60th United States Ambassador to the United Kingdom
- In office June 2, 1994 – September 20, 1997
- President: Bill Clinton
- Preceded by: Raymond G. H. Seitz
- Succeeded by: Philip Lader

10th Chair of the President's Intelligence Advisory Board
- In office January 20, 1993 – May 26, 1994
- President: Bill Clinton
- Preceded by: Bobby Ray Inman (acting)
- Succeeded by: Les Aspin

5th Chair of the Intelligence Oversight Board
- In office January 20, 1993 – May 26, 1994
- President: Bill Clinton
- Preceded by: James R. Thompson
- Succeeded by: Anthony S. Harrington

11th Chairman of the Joint Chiefs of Staff
- In office October 1, 1985 – September 30, 1989
- President: Ronald Reagan; George H. W. Bush
- Deputy: Robert T. Herres
- Preceded by: John William Vessey Jr.
- Succeeded by: Colin Powell

12th Commander of United States Pacific Command
- In office July 1, 1983 – September 18, 1985
- President: Ronald Reagan
- Preceded by: Robert L. J. Long
- Succeeded by: Ronald J. Hays

Personal details
- Born: January 2, 1925 La Grange, Kentucky, U.S.
- Died: October 18, 2007 (aged 82) Bethesda, Maryland, U.S.
- Party: Republican
- Education: United States Naval Academy (BS); Stanford University (MEd); Princeton University (MA, PhD)

Military service
- Allegiance: United States
- Branch/service: United States Navy
- Years of service: 1947–1989
- Rank: Admiral
- Commands: Chairman of the Joint Chiefs of Staff; United States Pacific Command; United States Naval Forces Europe; Allied Forces Southern Europe; Submarine Division 31; USS Trout (SS-566)
- Battles/wars: Vietnam War
- Awards: Defense Distinguished Service Medal (4); Navy Distinguished Service Medal (3); Army Distinguished Service Medal; Air Force Distinguished Service Medal; Coast Guard Distinguished Service Medal; Legion of Merit (3); Bronze Star Medal; Air Medal (7); Presidential Medal of Freedom

William James Crowe Jr. (January 2, 1925 – October 18, 2007) was a United States Navy admiral and diplomat who served as the 11th chairman of the Joint Chiefs of Staff under presidents Ronald Reagan and George H. W. Bush, and as the ambassador to the United Kingdom and Chair of the Intelligence Oversight Board under President Bill Clinton.

== Early life and education ==
Crowe was born in La Grange, Kentucky, on January 2, 1925. At the beginning of the Great Depression, Crowe's father moved the family to Oklahoma City. In June 1946, Crowe completed a war-accelerated course of study and graduated with the Class of 1947 from the United States Naval Academy in Annapolis, Maryland.

== Career ==
From 1954 to 1955, Crowe served as assistant to the naval aide of President Dwight D. Eisenhower. While serving in Eisenhower's White House in Spring of 1955, Crowe was tasked with figuring out a way to rid the White House lawn of squirrels, which were impacting the golfing greens Eisenhower had built on the lawn. From 1956 to 1958, Crowe served as executive officer of the submarine USS Wahoo (SS-565).

In 1958, he served as an aide to the Deputy Chief of Naval Operations. In 1960, Crowe took command of USS Trout (SS-566), homeported in Charleston, South Carolina, and served as commanding officer of that ship until 1962. From there, Crowe earned a master's degree in education at the Stanford Graduate School of Education. After turning down an invitation from Admiral Hyman G. Rickover to enter the Navy's nuclear power program, Crowe earned a Ph.D. in politics from Princeton University in 1965 after completing a doctoral dissertation titled "The policy roots of the modern Royal Navy 1946-1963."

During the Vietnam War he was the senior adviser to the Vietnamese Riverine Force. In 1969, he took command of Submarine Division 31, homeported in San Diego, California.

A long string of assignments followed:

- 1967 – Head of East Asia Pacific Branch, Politico-Military Division, Office of the Chief of Naval Operations
- 1970 – Senior adviser to the Vietnamese Navy Riverine Force
- 1973 – promoted to rear admiral and named Deputy Director, Strategic Plans, Policy, Nuclear Systems, and NSC Affairs Division, Office of the Chief of Naval Operations
- 1975 – Director, East Asia and Pacific Region, Office of the Secretary of Defense
- 1976 – Commander, Middle East Force (COMMIDEASTFOR)
- 1977 – promoted to vice admiral and named Deputy Chief of Naval Operations, Plans, Policy and Operations
- 1980 – promoted to admiral and named Commander-in-Chief, Allied Forces Southern Europe (CINCSOUTH)
- 1983 – as CINCSOUTH, named Commander-in-Chief, United States Naval Forces Europe (CINCUSNAVEUR)
- 1983 – Commander-in-Chief, United States Pacific Command (CINCPAC)

On July 10, 1985, Crowe was appointed by President Ronald Reagan to serve as Chairman of the Joint Chiefs of Staff (CJCS). He continued to serve as CJCS through the Bush administration until 1989, when he retired from active duty. He was the first Chairman of the Joint Chiefs of Staff to serve under the provisions of the Goldwater-Nichols Department of Defense Reorganization Act of 1986, where he as chairman became (not the collegial body of the Joint Chiefs of Staff), by statute, the principal military adviser to the president, the National Security Council, and the Secretary of Defense. On October 1, 1989, Army General Colin L. Powell succeeded him as CJCS.

== Later life and death ==
On March 16, 1989, he made a cameo appearance in the “Hot Rocks” episode of Cheers.

After he retired in October 1989, Crowe returned to the University of Oklahoma and William J. Crowe chair in geopolitics. Crowe surprised politicians when he endorsed Bill Clinton in the presidential election of 1992. President Clinton named Crowe chairman of the President's Foreign Intelligence Advisory Board in 1993. In 1994, Clinton appointed Crowe the United States Ambassador to the United Kingdom, and he served in that capacity until 1997.

Crowe sat on the boards of Texaco, Merrill Lynch, Pfizer, Norfolk Southern Corporation, and General Dynamics. He also served on the board of Emergent BioSolutions (then Bioport), a company that provided controversial anthrax vaccinations to the U.S. military in the 1990s. The deal was approved by the Clinton administration, with which Crowe had a previous relationship. At the time of his death, Crowe served as the chairman of the board of Global Options, Inc., an international risk-management and business solutions company headquartered in Washington, D.C.

As he did at the University of Oklahoma in 1990–91, Crowe taught a seminar class on national security at the United States Naval Academy from 2000 to 2007.

In 2004, Crowe was among 27 retired diplomats and military commanders called Diplomats and Military Commanders for Change who publicly said the administration of President George W. Bush did not understand the world and was unable to handle "in either style or substance" the responsibilities of global leadership.

On June 16, 2004, the former senior diplomats and military commanders issued a statement against the Iraq War.

== Death ==
Crowe died on October 18, 2007, at Bethesda Naval Hospital in Maryland at age 82 due to a heart condition.

His funeral was held on October 31, 2007, at the Naval Academy chapel; Bill Clinton spoke. Crowe is buried in the United States Naval Academy Cemetery.

As of 2016, he is one of only two deceased former Chairman of the Joint Chiefs to not be buried at Arlington National Cemetery. His immediate predecessor, John William Vessey Jr., died in 2016 and is buried in Minnesota State Veterans Cemetery, Little Falls, Minnesota.

== Legacy ==
In 2008, a fellowship was established in Crowe's honor at the University of Kentucky's Patterson School of Diplomacy and International Commerce to support a former member of the U.S. armed forces who – like Crowe – is shifting from military to diplomatic service.

In 2009, the International Programs Center at the University of Oklahoma established the Admiral William J. Crowe Jr. Award. This award is presented to an outstanding International and Area Studies (IAS) graduate every spring semester. The award recognizes an IAS student who has demonstrated high academic achievement, a commitment to public service, and a desire to pursue a career in global affairs. Also in 2009, the Xbox/ PS2 game, Heroes of the Pacific, was released. The main character's name is also William Crowe, though whether or not this was inspired by the real-life Crowe is unknown.

== Personal life ==
Crowe married Shirley Grennell in 1954. They had three children.

== Dates of rank ==
- Apprentice Seaman, United States Naval Reserve: December 4, 1942
- Midshipman, United States Naval Academy: June 23, 1943

Ensign	Lieutenant junior grade	Lieutenant	Lieutenant commander	Commander	Captain
O-1	O-2	O-3	O-4	O-5	O-6
June 5, 1946	June 5, 1949	June 1, 1952	January 1, 1958	July 1, 1962	July 1, 1967

Rear admiral (lower half)	Rear admiral (upper half)	Vice admiral	Admiral
O-7	O-8	O-9	O-10
N/A*
June 1, 1973	August 1, 1977	September 26, 1977	June 6, 1980

- At the time of Admiral Crowe's promotion, all rear admirals wore two stars, but the rank was divided into an "upper" and "lower half" for pay purposes

== Awards and recognition ==
Crowe was awarded Doctor of Laws (LL.D.) honorary degrees from numerous universities, including University of Liverpool, The George Washington University, and Knox College.

In 1986, he received the Golden Plate Award of the American Academy of Achievement presented by Awards Council member and Supreme Allied Commander Europe, General Bernard W. Rogers, USA.

In 1989, Crowe appeared in an episode of the television sitcom Cheers (Season 7, Episode 17 "Hot Rocks"), where he played himself, and was accused of stealing the General Manager Rebecca Howe's (Kirstie Alley) diamond earrings.

On 1990, he was the first recipient of the Distinguished Sea Service Award of Naval Order of the United States.

In 1993, Crowe published his memoirs in the book The Line of Fire: From Washington to the Gulf, the Politics and Battles of the New Military.

Crowe received four Defense Distinguished Service Medals and numerous military decorations from heads of state. In 1998, the American Atatürk Association honored Crowe with the "Atatürk Peace and Democracy Award". Following his retirement from the Navy, he was awarded a 2000 Presidential Medal of Freedom, the United States' highest civilian honor.

=== Awards and decorations ===
Badges
Submarine Warfare Insignia
Office of the Joint Chiefs of Staff Identification Badge

U.S. military decorations
Defense Distinguished Service Medal (with three Oak Leaf Clusters)
Navy Distinguished Service Medal (with two gold stars)
Army Distinguished Service Medal
Air Force Distinguished Service Medal
Coast Guard Distinguished Service Medal
Legion of Merit (with 2 gold award stars)
Bronze Star with Valor device
Air Medal with bronze award numeral 7 (strike/flight awards)
U.S. Unit Awards
Navy Unit Commendation
U.S. non-military decorations
Presidential Medal of Freedom
U.S. service and campaign awards
China Service Medal
American Campaign Medal
World War II Victory Medal
Navy Occupation Service Medal with Pacific clasp
National Defense Service Medal with bronze service star
Vietnam Service Medal with 1 campaign star
Humanitarian Service Medal
Foreign military decorations, unit and campaign awards
Knight Grand Cross of the Most Noble Order of the Crown of Thailand
Grand Cordon of the Order of the Rising Sun
Commander badge of the National Order of Legion of Honor
Knight Grand Cross of the Order of Merit
Knight of the Order of Naval Merit
Knight Grand Cross of the Order of Military Merit José María Córdova
Nishan-e-Pakistan (Pakistan)
Knight of the Grand Cross of the Order of Merit of the Italian Republic
Republic of Korea Order of the National Security Merit Tong-Il Medal
Republic of Vietnam Navy Distinguished Service Order 2nd Class
Republic of Vietnam Gallantry Cross with Palm and Bronze Star
Republic of Vietnam Gallantry Cross Unit Citation
Republic of Vietnam Civil Actions Unit Citation
Republic of Vietnam Armed Forces Honor Medal First Class
Republic of Vietnam Campaign Medal

Military offices
Preceded by Robert Long	Commander of United States Pacific Command; 1983–1985	Succeeded by Ronald Hays
Preceded by John Vessey	Chair of the Joint Chiefs of Staff; 1985–1989	Succeeded by Colin Powell
Government offices
Preceded by Bobby Inman; Acting	Chair of the President's Intelligence Advisory Board; 1993–1994	Succeeded by Les Aspin
Preceded by Jim Thompson	Chair of the Intelligence Oversight Board; 1993–1994	Succeeded by Anthony Harrington
Diplomatic posts
Preceded by Raymond Seitz	United States Ambassador to the United Kingdom; 1994–1997	Succeeded by Philip Lader
