= Walter H. Hunt =

American novelist

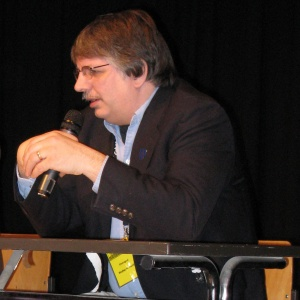
- Walter H. Hunt in 2009
- Born: 1959 (age 66–67)
- Education: Bowdoin College
- Occupations: Novelist, short story author
- Writing career
- Years active: 2001–present
- Genres: Alternate history, military science fiction, space opera
- Website: walterhunt.com

Walter H. Hunt (born 1959) is an American science fiction novelist from Massachusetts, United States.

== Career ==
Walter Hunt wrote a number of role-playing game books, including MechWarrior (1986) for FASA.

His writings currently include the Dark Wing series, a military science fiction space opera, as well as numerous role-playing scenarios for various gaming companies. He is a graduate of Bowdoin College and an alumnus of Alpha Rho Upsilon fraternity at Bowdoin.

Hunt's work experience has been as a software engineer and technical writer. He also has a deep interest in history (which he studied at college), in science fiction, which he has been reading since he watched Neil Armstrong walk on the Moon, and in baseball. His most recent book, A Song in Stone, explores the mystery of Rosslyn Chapel and the fall of the Templars.

He has also been a frequent contributor to Eric Flint's 1632-verse, most notably the 2015 novel 1636: The Cardinal Virtues which he co-wrote with Flint.

Hunt is a Freemason. He lives in eastern Massachusetts with his wife and daughter.

== Publications ==
=== Dark Wing series ===
- 2001: The Dark Wing. St Martin's Press. ISBN 0-7653-4069-0.
- 2003: The Dark Path. Tor Books. ISBN 0-7653-4564-1.
- 2004: The Dark Ascent. Tor Books. ISBN 0-7653-4982-5.
- 2005: The Dark Crusade. Tor Books. ISBN 0-7653-1117-8.

=== 1632 series ===
- 2011: "Les Ailes du Papillon (short story)". Ring of Fire III. Baen Books. 5 July 2011. ISBN 978-1-4391-3448-1.
- 2015: 1636: The Cardinal Virtues (with Eric Flint). Baen Books. 7 July 2015. ISBN 978-1476780610.
- 2020: 1636: The Atlantic Encounter (with Eric Flint). Baen Books. 4 August 2020. ISBN 978-1982124755.
- 2025: 1637: The French Correction (with Eric Flint). Baen Books. 4 March 2025. ISBN 978-1668072462.

=== Arcane America series ===
- 2019: Council of Fire (with Eric Flint). Baen Books. 5 November 2019. ISBN 978-1982124151.

=== Other works ===
- 2008: A Song in Stone. Wizards of the Coast. 2008. ISBN 978-0-7869-5067-6.
- 2018: Elements of Mind (reprint). WordFire Press. 3 July 2018. ISBN 978-1614756200.
- 2018: Harmony in Light. WordFire Press. 27 November 2018. ISBN 978-1614759393.
- 2019: City by the Bay: Stories of Novaya Rossiya. Eric Flint's Ring of Fire Press. 28 July 2019. ISBN 978-1948818452.
