= Alpha Rho Upsilon =

Fraternity at Bowdoin College, Maine, US (1946–1990)

- ΑΡΥ
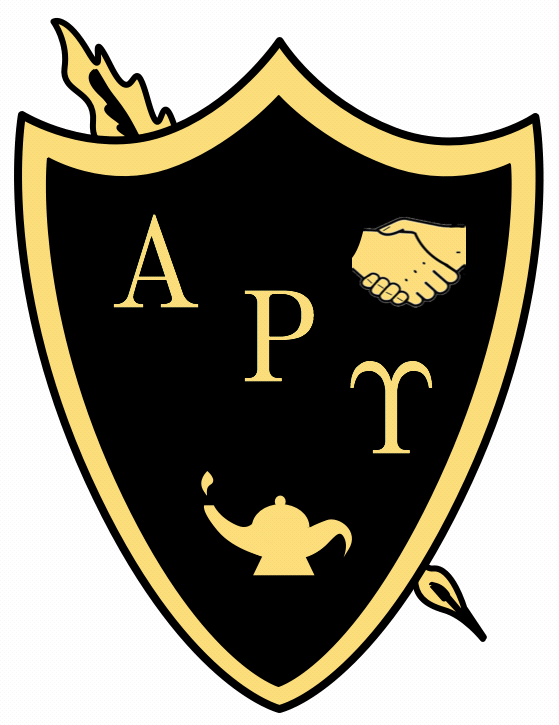
- Founded: January 1, 1946; 79 years ago Bowdoin College
- Type: Social
- Affiliation: Independent
- Status: Defunct
- Defunct date: 1990
- Emphasis: Religious and racial equality
- Scope: Local
- Motto: "All Races United"
- Colors: Black and Gold
- Chapters: 1
- Headquarters: 238 Maine Street; Brunswick, Maine 04011; United States

Alpha Rho Upsilon (ΑΡΥ in Greek, ARU in Latin/English; pronounced A-roo) was a local fraternity at Bowdoin College in Brunswick, Maine. It was established in 1946 and operated until the college closed all Greek letter organizations in 1990.

== History ==
Alpha Rho Upsilon formed from the Thorndike Club, a dining club established in 1937 for non-fraternity students at Bowdoin College. In January 1946, under the leadership of the club's faculty advisor Ernst Christian Helmreich and Moulton Union manager Donovan D. Lancaster, the club petitioned the university to become a fraternity called Alpha Rho Upsilon (ARU). The university recognized ARU on December 12, 1946. Its first president was Charles G. Chason. Psycholology professor Norman L. Munn became the fraternity's first advisor.

Alpha Rho Upsilon founding members were students who were World War II veterans. The fraternity was created in reaction to the exclusion of Jewish and African American students from the other campus fraternities and was founded as basis of religious and racial equality. It also disavowed the blackballing system of fraternities. The letters ARU stood for "All Races United".

The fraternity lived up to its name, admitting Black members and sponsoring its first Japanese member in 1951. Bowdoin first admitted women as exchange students in the 1960s. ARU voted to become co-ed immediately; Bowdoin's first woman graduate was a member of ARU. However, the campus newspaper, noted that the formation of ARU "enabled the other fraternities to continue engaging in anti-Semitic discrimination".

Arrears with the college forced ARU's closing in 1990, which initiated the conversion of all of Bowdoin's fraternities into a system of college-owned social houses, with entering students being assigned a "college house" as their first-year dormitory. Each house was renamed after a distinguished alumnus of the former fraternity; the ARU fraternity house was renamed Helmreich House after Ernst Christian Helmreich, the faculty adviser to the Thorndike Club from 1937 to 1946.

== Symbols ==
The Greek letters Alpha Rho Upsilon were selected to stand for "All Races United". The fraternity's motto was "All Races United". Its colors were black and gold.

== Chapter house ==
ARU initially resided in Moore Hall, one of Bowdoin's dormitories, then moved to a former faculty housing hall at 264 Maine Street. It purchased its 238 Maine Street home from the Sigma Nu fraternity in April 1952. An architectural hybrid of Colonial Revival and the Shingle Style featuring Palladian windows, gambrels, peaked dormers and a balconied front porch with Ionic columns, the ARU house was built between 1894 and 1900 as the residence of George Taylor and Edith Davis Files. An 1889 Bowdoin graduate, George Files was a German professor at the college until he died in 1919. In 1921, Mrs. Files endowed the George Taylor Files Professorship in Modern Languages at Bowdoin and sold their house to Sigma Nu, who in turn sold it to ARU in 1951 upon relocating to the college's present Hartley Cone Baxter House. The house accommodated 24 students. The "new wing" was added in the rear by 1965 with six double rooms and two bathrooms.

The house was transferred to the college in 1988.

== Governance ==
The ARU Executive Board, elected by popular vote of the fraternity members, comprised a president, vice president, recording secretary, treasurer, student council representative, historian, steward, and corresponding representative.

== Activities ==
ARU established a college-wide award, the James Bowdoin Cup, that was given annually to a distinguished scholar-athlete at the school.

== Notable members ==
Notable Alpha Rho Upsilon members include the following.

- Thomas Andrews (1975), United States House of Representatives
- Walter H. Hunt (1981), science fiction novelist
- Lawrence Lindsey (1976), economist and director of the National Economic Council
- Kurt Ollmann (1977), opera singer
- Berle M. Schiller (1965), senior United States district judge of the United States District Court for the Eastern District of Pennsylvania and judge of the Superior Court of Pennsylvania
