= Brent Scowcroft =

American general and official (1925–2020)

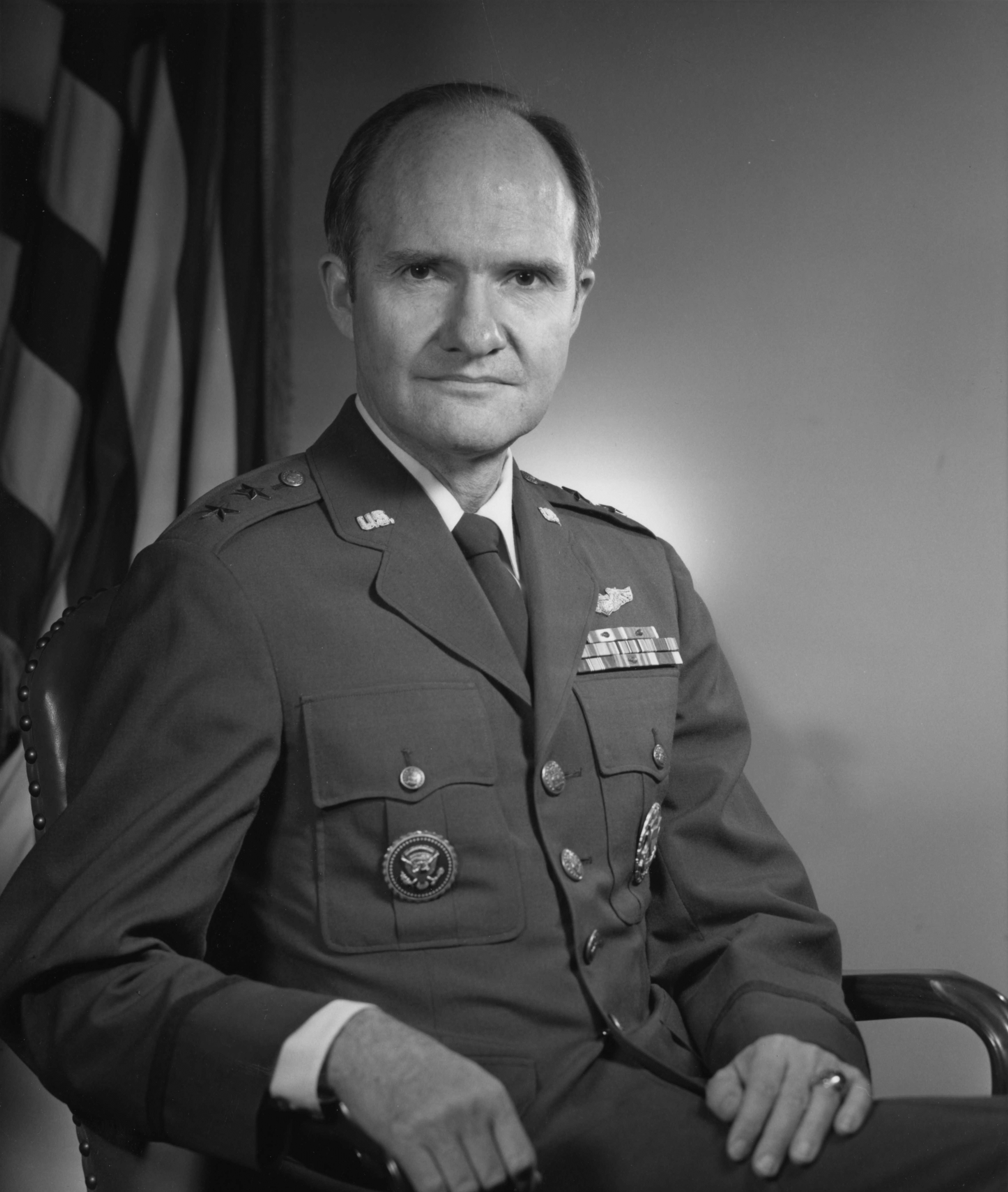
- Official portrait, 1973

Chair of the President's Intelligence Advisory Board
- In office October 5, 2001 – February 25, 2005
- President: George W. Bush
- Preceded by: Warren Rudman
- Succeeded by: Jim Langdon

Chair of the Intelligence Oversight Board
- In office January 20, 1993 – May 26, 1994
- President: Bill Clinton
- Preceded by: James R. Thompson
- Succeeded by: Anthony S. Harrington

8th and 16th United States National Security Advisor
- In office January 20, 1989 – January 20, 1993
- President: George H. W. Bush
- Deputy: Bob Gates; Jonathan Howe
- Preceded by: Colin Powell
- Succeeded by: Tony Lake
- In office November 3, 1975 – January 20, 1977
- President: Gerald Ford
- Deputy: William G. Hyland
- Preceded by: Henry Kissinger
- Succeeded by: Zbigniew Brzezinski

7th Deputy National Security Advisor
- In office January 4, 1973 – November 3, 1975
- President: Richard Nixon; Gerald Ford
- Preceded by: Alexander Haig
- Succeeded by: William G. Hyland

Personal details
- Born: March 19, 1925 Ogden, Utah, U.S.
- Died: August 6, 2020 (aged 95) Falls Church, Virginia, U.S.
- Resting place: Arlington National Cemetery
- Party: Republican
- Spouse: Marion Horner (m. 1951; died 1995)
- Children: 1 daughter
- Education: United States Military Academy (BS); Columbia University (MA, PhD)

Military service
- Allegiance: United States
- Branch/service: United States Air Force
- Years of service: 1947–1975
- Rank: Lieutenant General

Brent Scowcroft (/ˈskoʊkrɒft/; March 19, 1925 – August 6, 2020) was a United States Air Force officer, and a two-time United States National Security Advisor, first under U.S. President Gerald Ford and then under George H. W. Bush. He served as Military Assistant to President Richard Nixon and as Deputy Assistant to the President for National Security Affairs in the Nixon and Ford administrations. He served as Chairman of the President's Foreign Intelligence Advisory Board under President George W. Bush from 2001 to 2005, and advised President Barack Obama on choosing his national security team.

== Early life and education ==
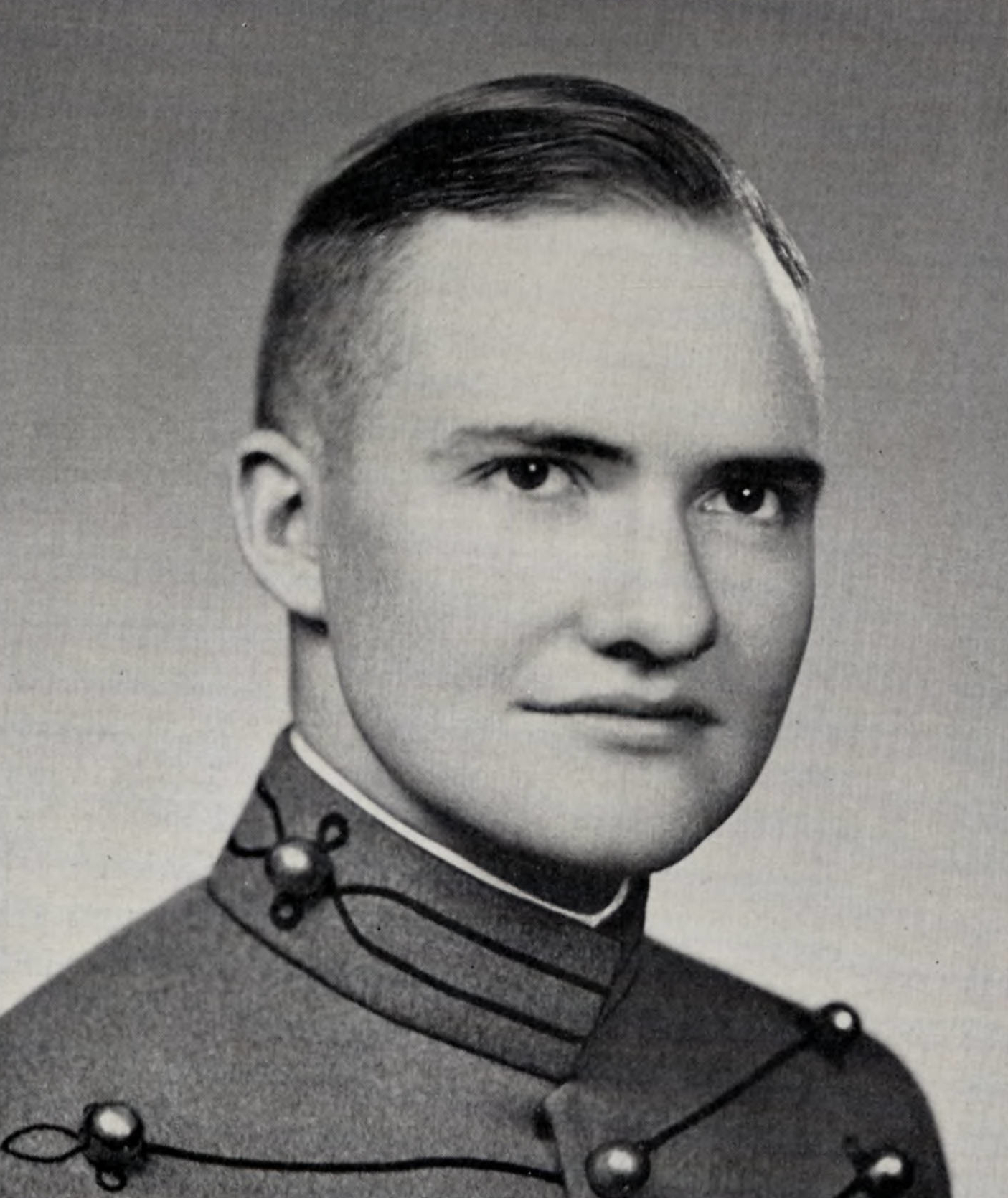
Scowcroft as a United States Military Academy cadet c. 1947

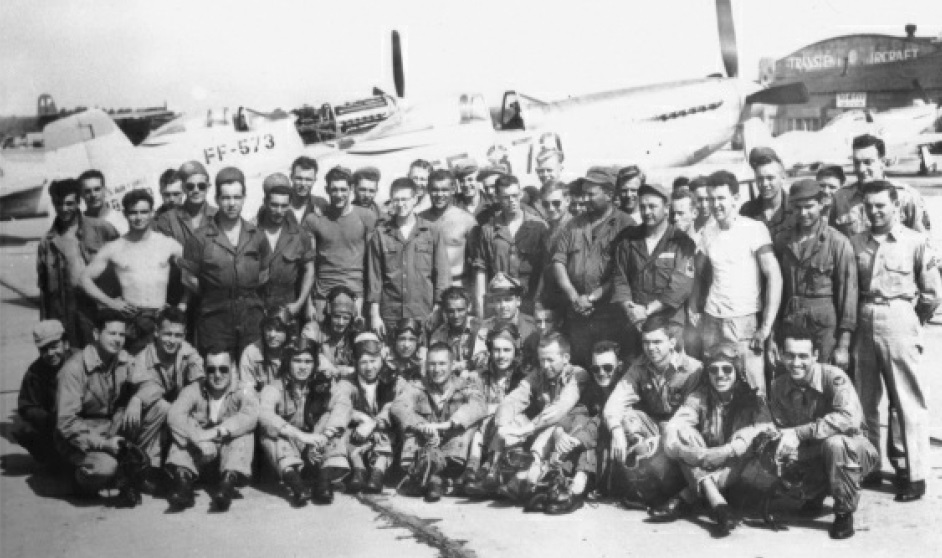
Lieutenant Brent Scowcroft (seated second from left) with other members of the 82nd Squadron at Grenier Airfield in 1948

Scowcroft was born March 19, 1925, in Ogden, Utah, the son of Lucile (née Ballantyne) and James Scowcroft, a grocer and business owner. He was a descendant of early 19th-century British immigrants from England and Scotland, along with immigrants from Denmark and Norway. He elaborated upon his relationship with the Church of Jesus Christ of Latter-day Saints in a 1999 oral history: "I have close personal ties to some of the church leadership. They would not consider me a good Mormon. I don't live by all of the rules the Mormons like—I like a glass of wine and a cup of coffee. But yes, I do consider myself a Mormon. It's part of a religious and a cultural heritage."

Scowcroft received his undergraduate degree and commission in the United States Army Air Forces from the United States Military Academy at West Point, New York, in June 1947. With the establishment of an independent United States Air Force in September 1947, his commission transferred to the USAF. Scowcroft subsequently earned an MA (1953) and PhD (1967) in international relations from Columbia University.

== Career ==
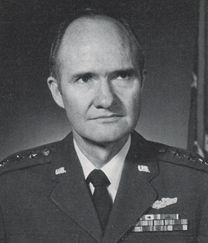
Brent Scowcroft upon receiving his third star as lieutenant general on August 17, 1974

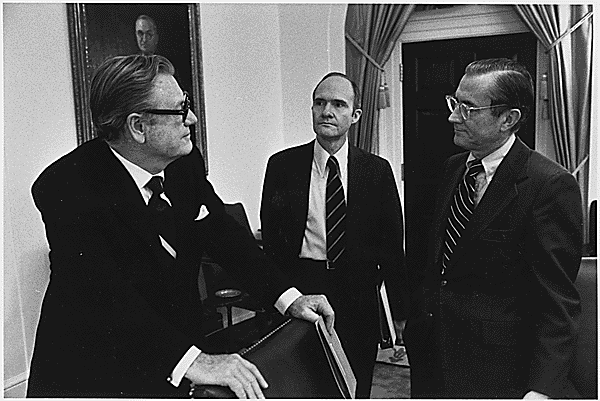
Deputy Assistant For National Security Affairs Brent Scowcroft discusses the Vietnam War with Vice President Nelson A. Rockefeller (l) and Central Intelligence Agency Director William Colby (r) during a break in a meeting of the National Security Council in April 1975.

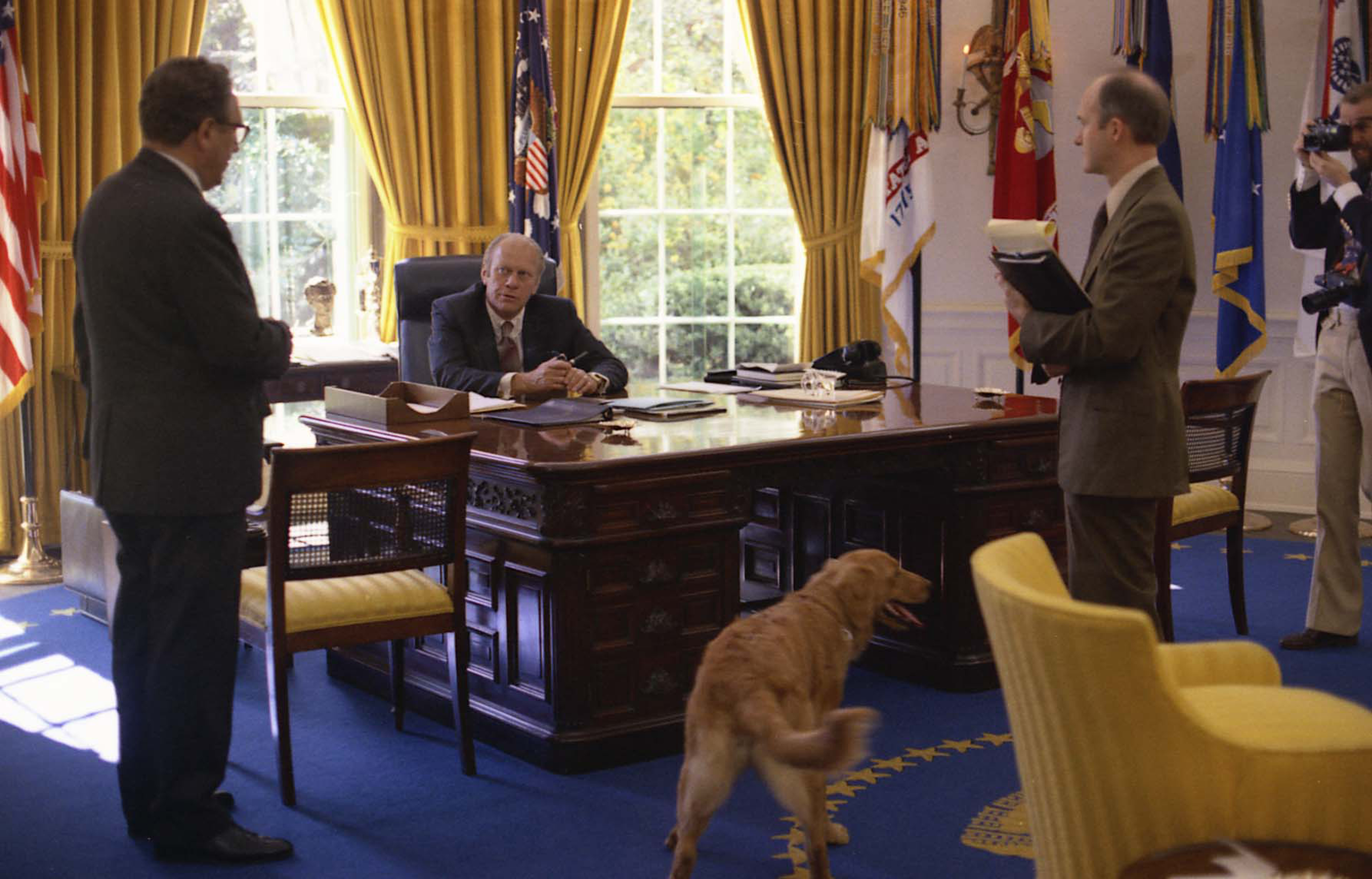
President Gerald Ford confers with Henry Kissinger and Scowcroft in October 1974.

Having envisioned life as a fighter pilot following World War II, Scowcroft completed his pilot training in October 1948 following his commissioning as an Air Force Second Lieutenant in 1947 and received his Air Force Command Pilot Wings. However, on January 6, 1949, while on flight training with a North American P-51 Mustang, his aircraft experienced engine trouble after taking-off from Grenier Army Airfield, causing the plane to crash-land. Although his injuries were not critical, Scowcroft assumed that he would never fly again and considered another career within the Air Force. He served in a variety of operational and administrative positions from 1948 to 1953. In the course of his military career, he held positions at the Joint Chiefs of Staff, headquarters of the United States Air Force, and the Office of the Assistant Secretary of Defense for International Security Affairs. His other assignments included: faculty positions at the United States Air Force Academy and the United States Military Academy, and Assistant Air Attaché in the American Embassy in Belgrade, Yugoslavia.

As a senior officer, General Scowcroft was assigned to Headquarters U.S. Air Force in the office of the Deputy Chief of Staff, Plans and Operations, and served in the Long Range Planning Division, Directorate of Doctrine, Concepts and Objectives from 1964 to 1966. He next attended the National War College at Fort McNair, followed by assignment in July 1968 to the Office of the Assistant Secretary of Defense for International Security Affairs. In September 1969, he was reassigned to Headquarters U.S. Air Force in the Directorate of Plans as Deputy Assistant for National Security Council Matters. In March 1970 he joined the Joint Chiefs of Staff organization and became the Special Assistant to the Director of the Joint Staff.

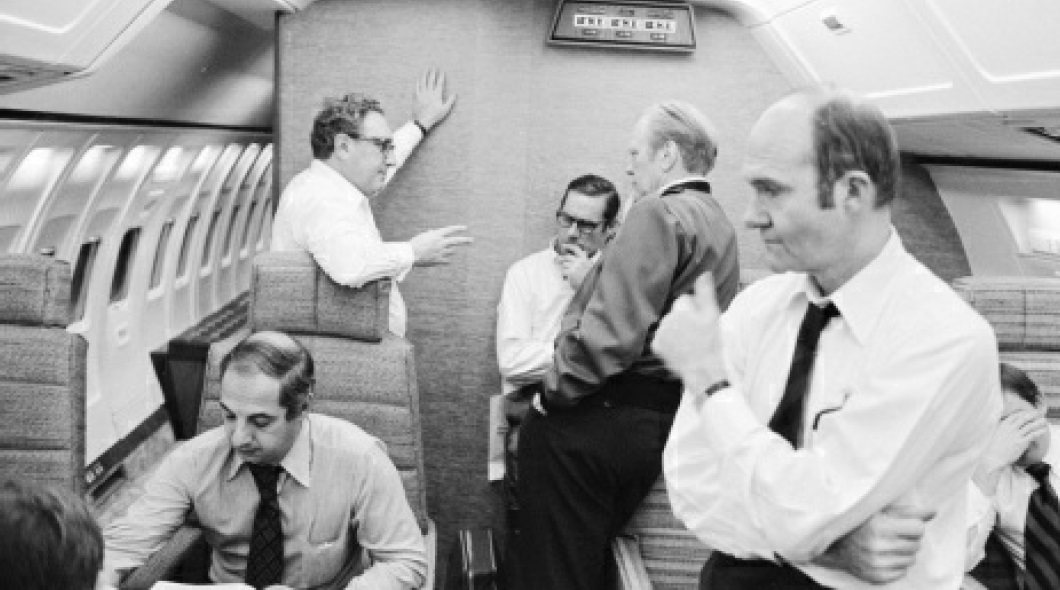
National Security Advisor Lieutenant General Brent Scowcroft with President Gerald Ford and Secretary of State Henry Kissinger on-board Air Force One on November 17, 1975

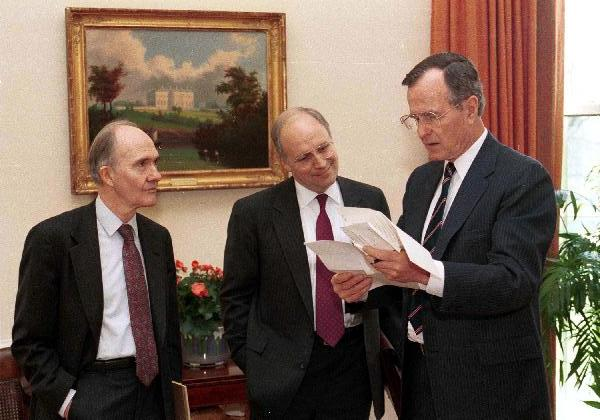
President George H. W. Bush examines papers with Dick Cheney and Scowcroft in April 1989.

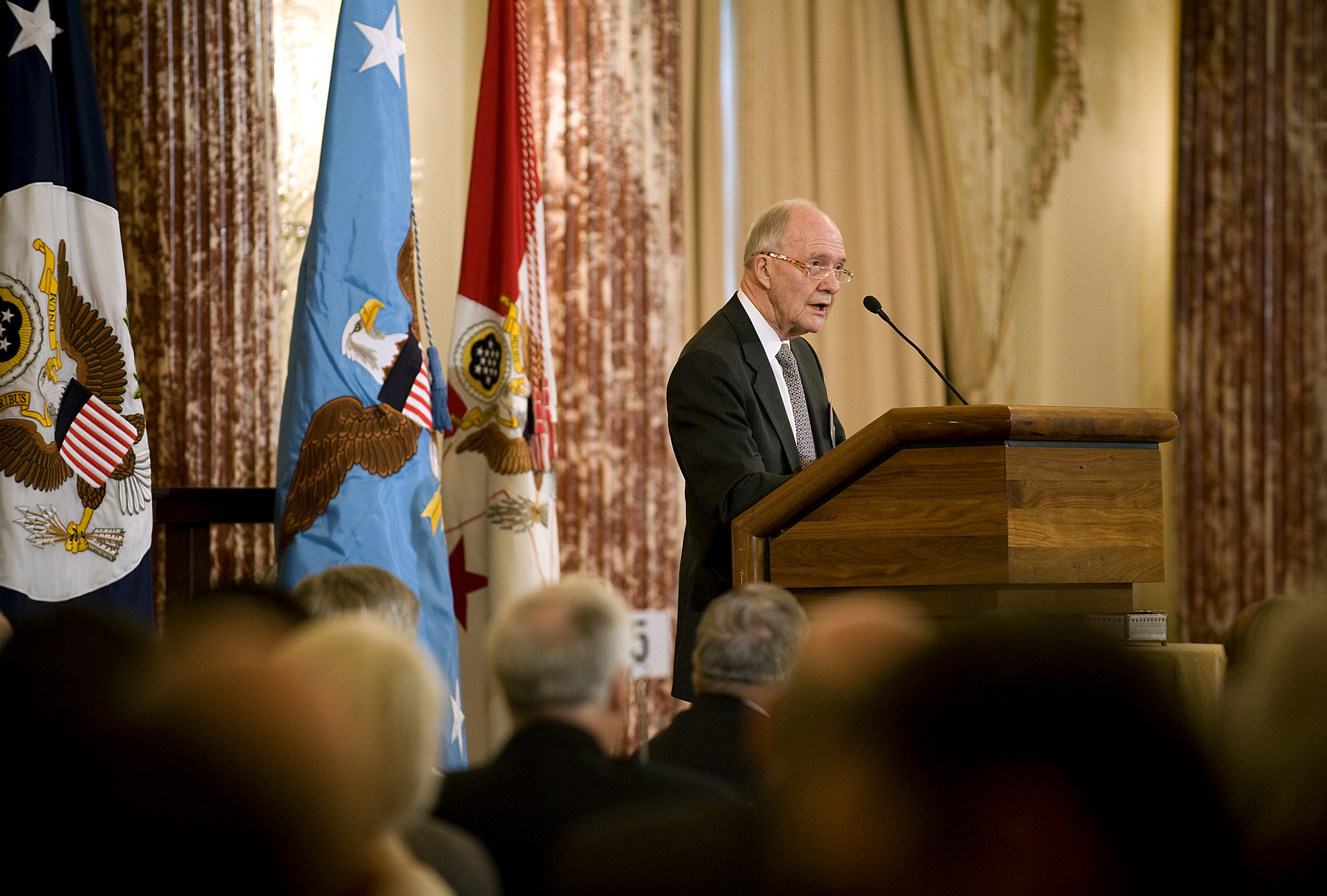
Scowcroft in October 2009, at the U.S. State Department in Washington, D.C.

External videos
- Booknotes interview with Scowcroft and George H. W. Bush on A World Transformed, October 4, 1998, C-SPAN
- After Words interview with Scowcroft and Zbigniew Brzezinski on America and the World, September 20, 2008, C-SPAN

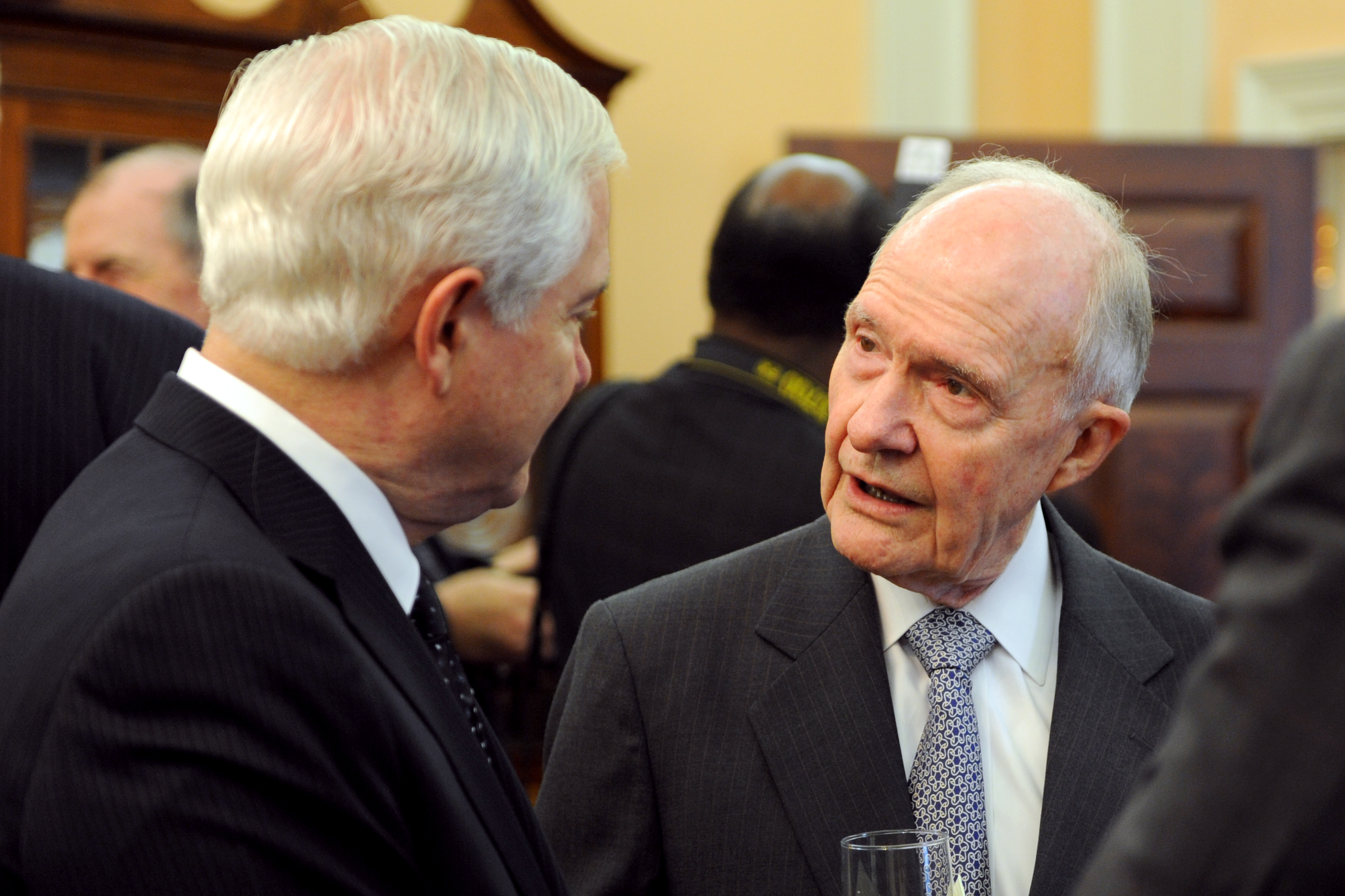
Scowcroft with Secretary of Defense Robert Gates

Scowcroft was appointed Military Assistant to the President in February 1972; and was reassigned as Deputy Assistant to the President for National Security Affairs in January 1973. He was promoted to lieutenant general on August 16, 1974, and retired from active duty at that rank on December 1, 1975. He had, just a month earlier, during the Halloween Massacre, become the United States National Security Advisor (for him, the first time), replacing Henry Kissinger. Scowcroft's continued service in the Air Force would have been contingent on reconfirmation of his rank by the Senate, a distinction that National Security Advisor H. R. McMaster elected to pursue in 2018.

His military decorations and awards included the Air Force Distinguished Service Medal, the Legion of Merit with oak leaf cluster and the Air Force Commendation Medal.

On the 24th anniversary of the USS Liberty incident (in 1991), approximately 50 Liberty survivors, including Captain William McGonagle, were invited to the White House to meet with President George H. W. Bush in a meeting set up by former Congressmen Paul Findley and Pete McCloskey. After waiting for over 2 hours, President Bush waved at them as he passed by in his limousine, but did not meet with them in person. Many of the survivors were reportedly disheartened and disappointed with this. Instead, Scowcroft and White House Chief of Staff John H. Sununu greeted them. Rear Admiral Thomas A. Brooks, who had spoken out in favor of Liberty survivors previously, presented them with a Presidential Unit Citation that had been signed by President Lyndon B. Johnson but never awarded. Former Chairman of the Joint Chiefs of Staff Admiral Thomas H. Moorer, a longtime Liberty advocate, was also in attendance. This meeting was objected to by the Anti-Defamation League.

Before joining the Bush administration, Scowcroft was vice chairman of Kissinger Associates. He had a long association with Henry Kissinger, having served as his assistant when Kissinger was the National Security Adviser under Richard Nixon, from 1969.

According to Bob Woodward in his 2026 memoir Secrets, Scowcroft was a confidential source who helped inform Woodward about Nixon's actions the night before he resigned from the Presidency.

Scowcroft was long sought after as a respected, professional and largely apolitical or nonpartisan expert (within the standards of fellow White House veterans) and chaired and served on a number of policy advisory councils, including the President's General Advisory Committee on Arms Control, the President's Commission on Strategic Forces, the President's Blue Ribbon Commission on Defense Management, the Defense Policy Board, and the President's Special Review Board (Tower Commission) investigating the Iran–Contra affair. He also served on the Guiding Coalition of the nonpartisan Project on National Security Reform. He was appointed Co-Chair of the Blue Ribbon Commission on America's Nuclear Future from 2010 to 2012 alongside Lee Hamilton.

On the morning of September 11, 2001, Scowcroft was in an E-4B aircraft, also known as the National Airborne Operations Command Center (NAOC), on the taxiway, waiting to takeoff for Offutt Air Force Base, when the first hijacked airliner hit the World Trade Center. Scowcroft's aircraft was en route to Offutt when a second hijacked airliner struck the other tower. Scowcroft was involved in observing the command and control operations of both President George W. Bush in Florida and Vice President Dick Cheney, who was at the White House.

Scowcroft was the founder and president of The Forum for International Policy, a think tank. He was also president of The Scowcroft Group, an international business consulting firm. He was co-chair, along with Joseph Nye, of the Aspen Strategy Group. He was a member of the Inter-American Dialogue, Trilateral Commission, and the Council on Foreign Relations and a board member of the Center for Strategic and International Studies and the Atlantic Council.

Scowcroft was a leading Republican critic of American policy towards Iraq before and after the 2003 invasion, which war critics in particular have seen as significant given Scowcroft's close ties to former President George H. W. Bush. He drew attention for reports of remarks critical of Bush – which he did not deny when reported by The Washington Post citing his view that "Bush is 'mesmerized' by Israeli Prime Minister Ariel Sharon, that Iraq was a 'failing venture' and that the administration's unilateralist approach has harmed relations between Europe and the United States." Despite his public criticism of the decision to invade, Scowcroft continued to describe himself as "a friend" of the Bush administration. He also strongly opposed a precipitous withdrawal, arguing that a pull-out from Iraq before the country was able to govern, sustain, and defend itself "would be a strategic defeat for American interests, with potentially catastrophic consequences both in the region and beyond". Scowcroft went on to stress that the U.S. must "secure the support of the countries of the region themselves. It is greatly in their self-interest to give that support.. unfortunately, in recent years they have come to see it as dangerous to identify with the United States, and so they have largely stood on the sidelines." The New York Times noted that Scowcroft was "a traditionalist, who believed that the nation should work with allies and international organizations, as opposed to a 'transformationalist,' like the second President Bush, who argued that America should fight terrorism by spreading democracy in the world."

External videos
- HBO History Makers Series: A Conversation with Brent Scowcroft, October 3, 2007, Council on Foreign Relations

He backed the invasion of Afghanistan as a "direct response" to 9/11 terrorism, a war that would go on to last about 20 years.

President George H. W. Bush presented him with the Presidential Medal of Freedom in 1991. In 1993, he was created an Honorary Knight Commander of the Order of the British Empire by Queen Elizabeth II at Buckingham Palace. In 1988, he received the Golden Plate Award of the American Academy of Achievement. In 2005, Scowcroft was awarded the William Oliver Baker Award by the Intelligence and National Security Alliance.

In 1998, he co-wrote A World Transformed with George H. W. Bush. This book described what it was like to be in the White House during the end of the Cold War, as the Soviet Union collapsed in the early 1990s. Notably, both figures explained why they didn't go on to Baghdad in 1991: "Had we gone the invasion route, the United States could conceivably still be an occupying power in a bitterly hostile land." In 1994, Scowcroft co-authored the opinion-editorial "The Time for Temporizing is Over" urging President Bill Clinton to order a preemptive strike on North Korea's Yongbyon nuclear facility unless it readmitted International Atomic Energy Agency inspectors.

His discussions of foreign policy with Zbigniew Brzezinski, led by journalist David Ignatius, were published in a 2008 book titled America and the World: Conversations on the Future of American Foreign Policy.

Scowcroft was a member of the Honorary Council of Advisors for U.S.-Azerbaijan Chamber of Commerce (USACC). Critics have suggested that Scowcroft was unethical in his lobbying for the Turkish and Azeri governments because of his ties to Lockheed Martin and other defense contractors that do significant business with Turkey. He was also a member of the board of directors of the International Republican Institute, and served on the Advisory Board for Columbia University's School of International and Public Affairs and for America Abroad Media.

Scowcroft endorsed Hillary Clinton in the run-up for the 2016 United States presidential election.

In 1989, he was sent to Beijing by President George H.W. Bush for a sensitive China-related mission following the Tiananmen Square massacre.

== Evaluation ==
Scholarly evaluations of Scowcroft's performance have been generally favorable. For example Ivo Daalder and I. M. Destler quoting other scholars, conclude:

"Brent Scowcroft was in many ways the ideal national security adviser—indeed, he offers a model for how the job should be done." His "winning formula" consisted of gaining the trust of the key principals of U.S. foreign policymaking, establishing "a cooperative policy process at all levels," one both transparent and collegial, and keeping an "unbreakable relationship with the president," thanks to their close friendship and mutual respect. The result was that Scowcroft "proved to be an extraordinarily effective national security adviser" in comparison with others who have held the office, particularly in light of the difficult and transformative period in which he held office.

Other evaluations from colleagues and national security veterans in both parties echo similar points.

In a largely laudatory obituary, The New York Times noted "his appeal for public service was a classic reminder of a less partisan age, when presidents often reached out to experienced talent, regardless of party loyalties."

The Atlantic Council provided an assessment, with quotes from several experts after Scowcroft's death, that noted "Looking back on his time working with Scowcroft in the Nixon administration, former US Secretary of State Henry Kissinger explained that 'in a period when America was tearing itself apart,' Scowcroft’s 'steadiness had a calming influence then as did his faith in his country’s ultimate purposes.' Former US Secretary of Defense Robert Gates argued that what 'set Brent apart as National Security Advisor was that he played fair…he did not take advantage of his close relationship with the president to disadvantage others.' John Deutch, former Director of Central Intelligence, recalled that “Brent had the ideal temperament to lead the country. He was smart, deceptively articulate with a calm demeanor that often masked his strategic thinking.'"

== Scowcroft award ==
Scowcroft was the inspiration and namesake for a special presidential award begun under the George H. W. Bush administration. According to Gates, the award is given to the official "who most ostentatiously falls asleep in a meeting with the president". According to Gates, the president "evaluated candidates on three criteria. First, duration—how long did they sleep? Second, the depth of the sleep. Snoring always got you extra points. And third, the quality of recovery. Did one just quietly open one's eyes and return to the meeting, or did you jolt awake and maybe spill something hot in the process?" According to Bush himself, the award "gives extra points for he/she who totally craters, eyes tightly closed, in the midst of meetings, but in fairness a lot of credit is given for sleeping soundly while all about you are doing their thing." Scowcroft had gained a reputation for doing such things during meetings to the extent that it became a running gag. Scowcroft fell into a deep sleep so often, that Bush once took an airhorn out from his desk and blasted it in Scowcroft’s direction to awaken him, much to the amusement of everyone present.

== Personal life ==
Scowcroft married Marian Horner in 1951. His wife, a Pennsylvania native, was trained as a nurse at St. Francis School of Nursing in Pittsburgh and graduated from Columbia University. They had one daughter, Karen Scowcroft. Marian Horner Scowcroft, a diabetic, died on July 17, 1995, at George Washington University Hospital.

In March 1993, when Scowcroft was given an honorary KBE by Queen Elizabeth II, his daughter was also received by the Queen.

=== Death ===
On August 6, 2020, Scowcroft died at his home in Falls Church, Virginia, at age 95. On January 29, 2021, Scowcroft was buried at Arlington National Cemetery.

== Honors ==
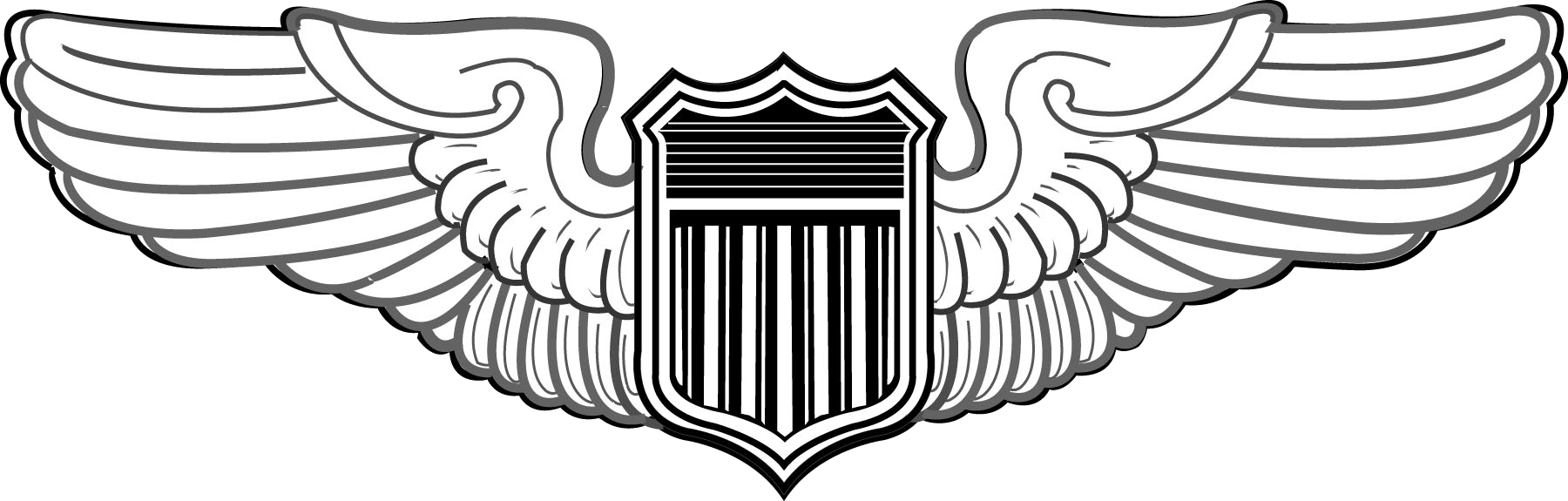
- Air Force Pilot Badge
- Office of the Joint Chiefs of Staff Identification Badge
- Presidential Service Badge
- Air Force Distinguished Service Medal with three bronze oak leaf cluster
- Legion of Merit with oak leaf cluster
- Presidential Medal of Freedom (1991)
- Department of Defense Medal for Distinguished Public Service (2016)
- Honorary Knight Commander of the Order of the British Empire, Military version (KBE) (1993)
- Order of the Cross of Terra Mariana, 3rd Class (2006)
- Grand Cross of the Order of Merit of the Federal Republic of Germany (2009)
- Grand Cordon of the Order of the Rising Sun (2016)

== Honorary degrees ==
Location	Date	School	Degree
District of Columbia	1989	George Washington University	Doctor of Laws (LL.D)
Utah	April 24, 1992	Brigham Young University	Doctor of Public Service (DPS)
Virginia	2000	College of William & Mary	Doctor of Humane Letters (DHL)
New York	May 18, 2005	Columbia University	Doctor of Laws (LL.D)
Utah	December 10, 2010	Weber State University	Doctor of Humane Letters (DHL)

== See also ==
- History of the United States National Security Council 1989–1992

Political offices
Preceded by Alexander Haig	Deputy National Security Advisor; 1973–1975	Succeeded by William Hyland
Preceded by Henry Kissinger	National Security Advisor; 1975–1977	Succeeded by Zbigniew Brzezinski
Preceded by Colin Powell	National Security Advisor; 1989–1993	Succeeded by Tony Lake
Government offices
Preceded by Warren Rudman	Chair of the President's Intelligence Advisory Board; 2005–2009	Succeeded by Jim Langdon
Preceded by Warren Rudman	Chair of the Intelligence Oversight Board; 2005–2009	Succeeded by Jim Langdon
