= Neal S. Wolin =

American politician and lawyer (born 1961)

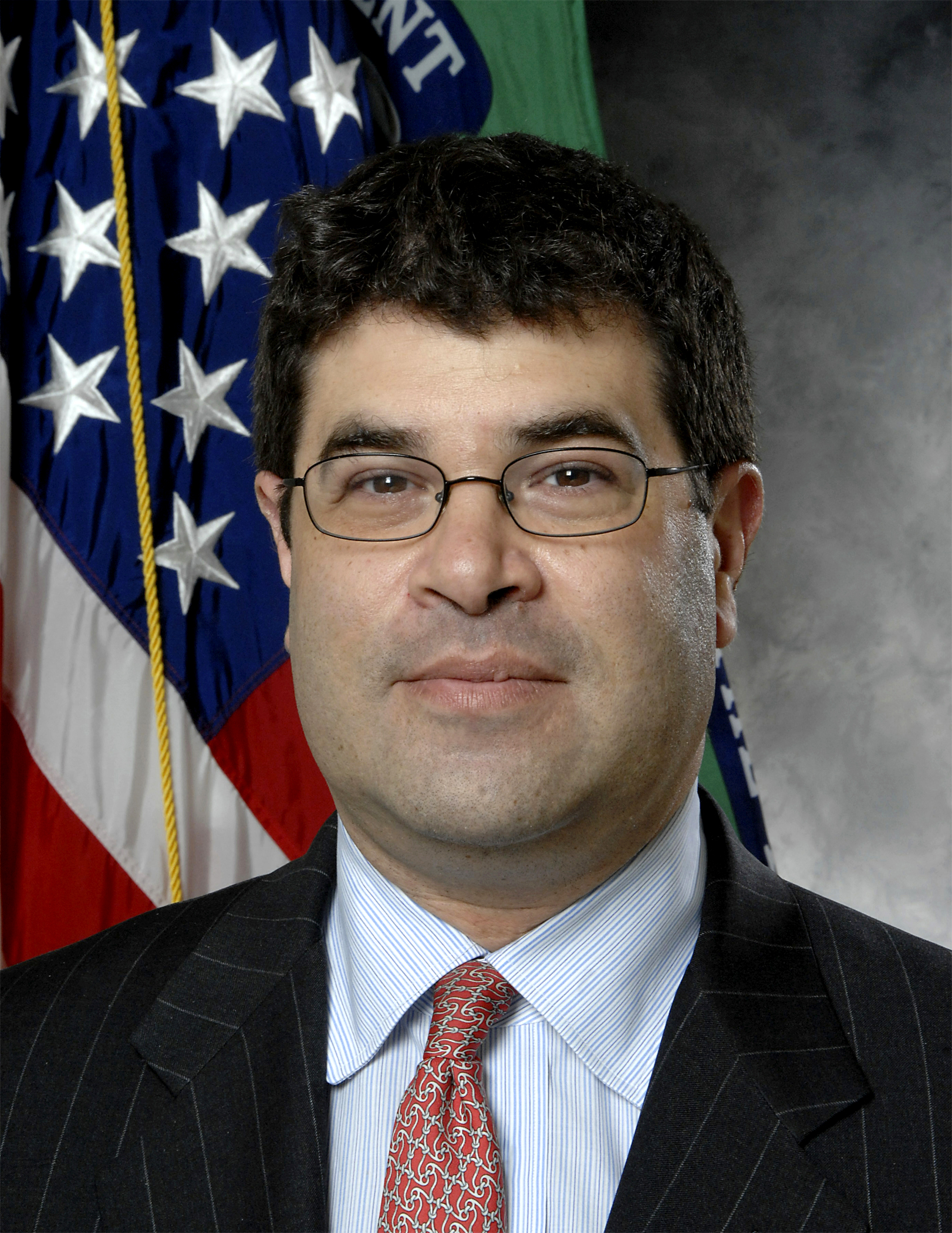
- Official portrait, 2009

Member of the President's Intelligence Advisory Board, Chair of the Intelligence Oversight Board
- In office May 24, 2015 – January 20, 2017
- President: Barack Obama
- Preceded by: Daniel Meltzer
- Succeeded by: Steve Feinberg

United States Secretary of the Treasury
- Acting; January 25, 2013 – February 28, 2013
- President: Barack Obama
- Preceded by: Timothy Geithner
- Succeeded by: Jack Lew

United States Deputy Secretary of the Treasury
- In office May 18, 2009 – August 31, 2013
- President: Barack Obama
- Preceded by: Robert M. Kimmitt
- Succeeded by: Mary J. Miller (Acting)

Personal details
- Born: December 9, 1961 (age 64) Evanston, Illinois, U.S.
- Party: Democratic
- Education: Yale University (BA, JD); Balliol College, Oxford (MSc)

Neal Steven Wolin (born December 9, 1961) is an American lawyer. He is a vice chairman of the corporate advisory firm Brunswick Group, an equity partner of Data Collective, a board partner of Social Capital, and a limited partner advisor of Nyca Partners. He was the longest-serving Deputy Secretary of the U.S. Department of the Treasury and also served as Acting Secretary of the Treasury in early 2013.

In 2009, following eight years with The Hartford Financial Services Group, Wolin was appointed Deputy Secretary of the U.S. Department of the Treasury by President Barack Obama, where he led the U.S. government's financial reform plan during the Great Recession, including the Dodd-Frank Wall Street Reform and Consumer Protection Act. He resigned as Deputy Secretary in August 2013.

Wolin also served during the Clinton administration for eight years as general counsel, Deputy General Counsel of the Treasury, and as a staff member of the United States National Security Council.

== Early life and education ==
Wolin was born and raised in Evanston, Illinois, where he graduated from Evanston Township High School in 1979. His father, Harry S. Wolin, was a lawyer; and his mother, Doris Wolin, was a former public school teacher.

Wolin graduated summa cum laude with a B.A. in history from Yale University, where he served as president of the Yale Political Union. He then received a M.S. in Development Economics from Balliol College, Oxford, as a Charles and Julia Henry Fellow; and subsequently earned a J.D. from Yale University, where he was a Coker Teaching Fellow in Constitutional Law.

== Career ==
Following law school, Wolin served as a law clerk to U.S. District Judge Eugene Nickerson in Brooklyn, New York, and taught as an adjunct professor of law at Brooklyn Law School. Wolin also worked at the Washington, D.C. law firm of Wilmer, Cutler & Pickering.

From 1990 to 1993, Wolin served as Special Assistant to three Directors of Central Intelligence: William H. Webster, Robert Gates, and R. James Woolsey, Jr.

=== Clinton administration ===
From 1993 to 1994, Wolin served as Deputy Legal Advisor to the National Security Council.

In 1994, Wolin became executive assistant to National Security Advisor Anthony Lake and Deputy National Security Advisor Sandy Berger.

From 1995 to 1999, he served as the Deputy General Counsel of the Department of the Treasury, under Secretary Robert Rubin. For part of 1999, he also served as the department's Acting General Counsel.

In November 1998, he was appointed to the President's Commission on Holocaust Assets in the United States.

From September 15, 1999 to January 20, 2001, Wolin served as General Counsel of the U.S. Department of the Treasury, under Secretary Lawrence Summers.

In January 2001, Secretary Summers presented Wolin the Alexander Hamilton Award, the highest honor awarded to a Treasury official.

In early 2001, Wolin was also visiting fellow in economic studies at the Brookings Institution, and an adjunct assistant professor at Harvard Kennedy School at Harvard University.

=== The Hartford ===
In March 2001, Wolin joined The Hartford Financial Services Group as executive vice-president and general counsel, overseeing the company's legal and tax departments, government affairs, communications, and marketing functions. In 2007, he became president and COO of the company's property and casualty insurance subsidiaries.

=== Obama administration ===
In February 2009, shortly after Barack Obama took office, Wolin returned to Washington, D.C. as Deputy Assistant to the President and Deputy Counsel to the President for Economic Policy.

In March 2009, he was nominated as Deputy Secretary of the United States Department of the Treasury by President Obama, then confirmed by the senate on May 18, 2009. Wolin served as United States Acting Secretary of the Treasury from January 25 to February 28, 2013, prior to the confirmation of Jack Lew, who was nominated by Obama to succeed Secretary Timothy Geithner.

Wolin was a "key architect" of U.S. financial reforms during the Great Recession, and was instrumental to the development and implementation of the Dodd-Frank Wall Street Reform and Consumer Protection Act. The Act aimed to upgrade "the foundation for a stronger financial system – closing regulatory gaps, increasing transparency for consumers, and strengthening prudential requirements,” including an annual “stress-test” by the Federal Reserve of the 33 banks designated as being “systemically important” to the U.S. economy.

From early 2009 until late 2013, during his tenure as Deputy Treasury Secretary, Wolin also chaired the Committee on Foreign Investment in the United States (CFIUS), which reviews, for national security reasons, any transaction that would result in a foreign entity having control over a U.S. asset.

In July 2011, Wolin was appointed to the Government Accountability and Transparency Board.

In January 2013, Wolin was awarded a second Alexander Hamilton Award by Secretary Timothy Geithner.

On July 22, 2013, President Obama officially announced Wolin’s retirement as Deputy Secretary at the end of August 2013, stating that “His deep knowledge and excellent judgment helped us prevent a second Great Depression, pass tough new Wall Street reform, strengthen our financial system, foster growth here at home, and promote economic development around the world.”

In August 2014, he was appointed to the President's Intelligence Advisory Board, from which he later resigned on January 20, 2017.

=== Brunswick Group ===
In February 2018, Wolin was appointed as CEO of the global corporate advisory firm Brunswick Group. During 2024, Wolin became a vice chairman.

== Board memberships and professional affiliations ==
Wolin has served on numerous boards of directors, and is a member of the Council on Foreign Relations, and of the bars of Illinois, Connecticut, and the District of Columbia. Current affiliations include:

Trustee, Yale University

Member, Board of Overseers, RAND Institute for Civil Justice.

Board partner, Social Capital

Equity partner, Data Collective

Limited Partner Advisor, Nyca Partners

Board member, Treliant

Board member, Partnership for Public Service

Board member, Atlantic Council

Board Member, Jupiter Intelligence

Board Member, Results for America

== Personal life ==
In July 2001, he met Nicole Louise Elkon, who had also been on staff at the White House during the Clinton administration; the couple married in East Hampton, New York. They have three children.

Political offices
Preceded by Robert Kimmitt	United States Deputy Secretary of the Treasury; 2009–2013	Succeeded by Mary Miller; Acting
Preceded by Timothy Geithner	United States Secretary of the Treasury; Acting; 2013	Succeeded by Jack Lew
Government offices
Preceded by Dan Meltzer	Chair of the Intelligence Oversight Board; 2015–2017	Succeeded by Steve Feinberg
