= The Dark Path (Hunt novel) =

2003 science fiction novel by Walter H. Hunt

- Author: Walter H. Hunt
- Genre: Science fiction
- Publication date: March 1, 2003
- ISBN: 0-765-30606-9
- Preceded by: The Dark Wing
- Followed by: The Dark Ascent

The Dark Path is a 2002 science fiction novel by Walter H. Hunt. It is the sequel to The Dark Wing (2001) and is set 70 years later. The series also includes The Dark Ascent (2004) and The Dark Crusade (2005).

== Plot summary ==
Most of the characters in The Dark Path are new and did not appear in The Dark Wing.

The novel takes place 70 years after the events of The Dark Wing. Humans and Zor are at peace, with Sergei having taken on the mantle of gyaryu'har. The gyaryu falls into the hands of a new race with telepathic powers, whose name is shortened to the 'vuhl.' Jacqueline Laperriere, the commander of one of the first territories to be attacked by the vuhl, evacuates, saving the lives of everyone but Sergei. She eventually becomes the new gyaryu'har.

== Reception ==
A writer for Publishers Weekly reviewed The Dark Path positively, writing "Hunt does a better job of depicting character and handling zor mythology and interspecies relations than in his debut novel."

A review in Kirkus Reviews predicted that the novel would elicit mixed reactions from user's writing, "What with the psychic-warrior complications, more Star Wars than Honor Harrington: some fans will relish the exploration of zor culture; others will grow impatient with the lack of action."

The book has been reviewed in Vector and Analog Science Fiction and Fact.
