= The Dark Wing =

2001 novel by Walter H. Hunt

- Author: Walter H. Hunt
- Language: English
- Publication date: 2001

The Dark Wing is a 2001 military science fiction novel by Walter H. Hunt and part one of a 4-part series. It features an ongoing war between humanity and birdlike mystical aliens known as the Zor. The two species have been at war for over sixty years, punctuated by numerous truces, each broken by the Zor. Every time this occurs, humanity wins territory from the Zor. However, humanity has little understanding of the Zor and fails to understand why the Zor continually engage in these wars. Lord Ivan Marais, with the assistance of Mr. Stone, collects information on the Zor during diplomatic missions and writes a book on them, stating the only way to win the war was to exterminate the Zor, as their religion dictates that their main deity, esLi, has granted the entire universe for the use of the Zor, and any other sentient species is an affront to their religion that must be removed.

The Zor launch a surprise attack; now-Admiral Mairas is given command of the campaign and he attempts to exterminate the Zor. However his second in command Stone is not what he seems.

There are three sequels:

- 2003: The Dark Path. Tor Books. August 2004. ISBN 0-7653-4564-1.
- 2004: The Dark Ascent. Tor Books. August 2005. ISBN 0-7653-4982-5.
- 2005: The Dark Crusade. Tor Books. August 2005. ISBN 0-7653-1117-8.

== Reception ==
The book has been reviewed in Escape Pod and Analog Science Fiction and Fact.
