= Jim Langdon =

American lawyer

Chair of the President's Intelligence Advisory Board
- In office February 25, 2005 – December 20, 2005
- President: George W. Bush
- Preceded by: Brent Scowcroft
- Succeeded by: Steve Friedman

Personal details
- Born: September 20, 1945 (age 80) Los Angeles, California, U.S.
- Party: Republican
- Education: University of Texas at Austin (BBA, JD)

James Calhoun Langdon Jr. (born September 20, 1945 in Los Angeles, California) is an American attorney and former government official. He served as a member (2001-2005) and briefly chair (February 2005-December 20, 2005) of the President's Foreign Intelligence Advisory Board under George W. Bush. Langdon, a partner in the Akin Gump law firm, was one of Bush's "Pioneer" fundraisers.

He earned a B.B.A. at the University of Texas at Austin in 1967 and a J.D. at the University of Texas School of Law in 1970.

In December 2025, Langdon was fined $1.1 million by the U.S. Department of the Treasury for Office of Foreign Assets Control sanctions violations over management of Heritage Trust, which Treasury determined to be vehicle for Russian oligarch Suleiman Kerimov to evade U.S. sanctions. OFAC said Langdon provided "substantial cooperation" in the investigation. OFAC did not name Langdon but Bloomberg reported he was the subject of the action. A representative for Langdon, who retired from Akin Gump in 2019, told Bloomberg he "believed at all times that the activities and operation of the trust were entirely compliant with applicable laws and regulations."

Government offices
Preceded by Brent Scowcroft	Chair of the President's Intelligence Advisory Board; 2005	Succeeded by Steve Friedman
Preceded by Brent Scowcroft	Chair of the Intelligence Oversight Board; 2005	Succeeded by Steve Friedman
