= Anthony Stephen Harrington =

American lawyer

Anthony Stephen Harrington is a lawyer and retired government official. He served as United States ambassador to Brazil from 1999 to 2001 under President Bill Clinton. As of 2020, Harrington is chair of Albright Stonebridge Group's (ASG) managing board and co-leads the firm's Americas practice. He also was CEO.

== Education ==
Harrington was a Morehead Scholar at the University of North Carolina at Chapel Hill where he earned a B.A. and earned a J.D. from the Duke University School of Law Class of 1966.

== Career ==
He is chair of the advisory council of the Brazil Institute at the Woodrow Wilson Center. Harrington was a longtime partner at Hogan & Hartson (now Hogan Lovells) in Washington, D.C.

Government offices
Preceded by William J. Crowe	Chair of the Intelligence Oversight Board; 1994–2000	Succeeded by Warren Rudman; Acting
Diplomatic posts
Preceded by Melvyn Levitsky	United States Ambassador to Brazil; 2000–2001	Succeeded by Cristobal R. Orozco; Acting
