= Ellen Laipson =

- Education: Cornell University (BA); Johns Hopkins University (MA)

Ellen Laipson is a Distinguished Fellow and President Emeritus of The Stimson Center. She is a member of the council of the International Institute for Strategic Studies. She was previously Vice Chair of the National Intelligence Council (1997–2002) and Special Assistant to the US Permanent Representative to the United Nations (1995–97). She was a member of President Barack Obama's Intelligence Advisory Board for 2009 to 2013, and on the U.S. Secretary of State's Foreign Affairs Policy Board from 2011 to 2014. She also serves as a professor at the George Mason University - Schar School of Policy and Government.
