= Lawrence Lindsey =

American economist and government official (born 1954)

Larry Lindsey
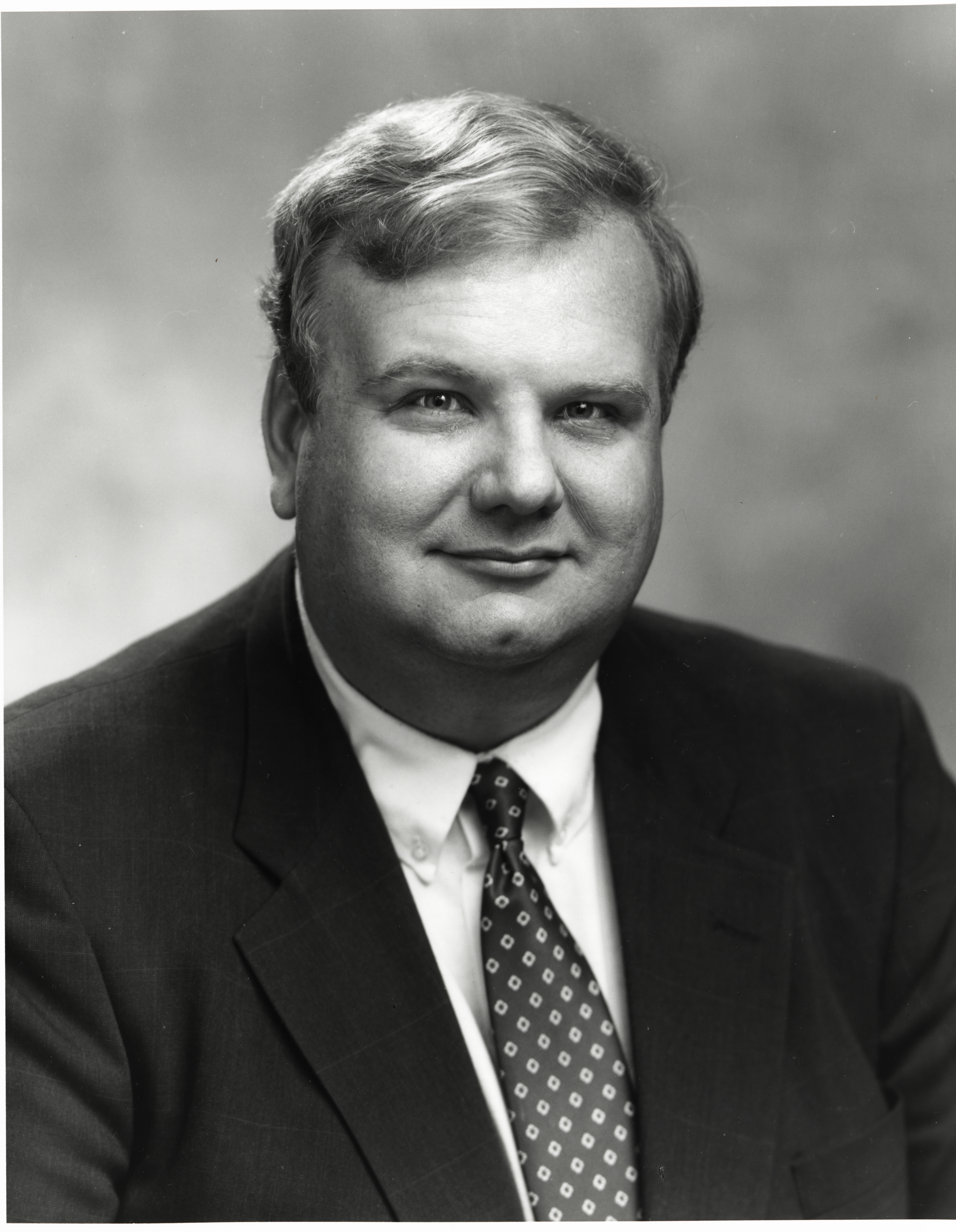

4th Director of the National Economic Council
- In office January 20, 2001 – December 12, 2002
- President: George W. Bush
- Preceded by: Gene Sperling
- Succeeded by: Steve Friedman

Member of the Federal Reserve Board of Governors
- In office November 26, 1991 – February 5, 1997
- President: George H. W. Bush; Bill Clinton
- Preceded by: Manuel H. Johnson
- Succeeded by: Roger W. Ferguson Jr.

Personal details
- Born: July 18, 1954 (age 71) Peekskill, New York, U.S.
- Party: Republican
- Spouse: Susan Lindsey (m. 2013, divorced)
- Children: 3
- Education: Bowdoin College (BA); Harvard University (MA, PhD)

Lawrence B. Lindsey (born July 18, 1954) is an American economist and author. He was director of the National Economic Council (2001–2002), and the assistant to the president on economic policy for George W. Bush. Lindsey previously served as a member of the Federal Reserve Board of Governors from 1991 to 1997, nominated to position by President George H. W. Bush. During his time with George W. Bush administration he played a leading role in formulating President Bush's $1.35 trillion tax cut plan, convincing candidate Bush that he needed an "insurance policy" against an economic downturn. He left the White House in December 2002 and was replaced by Stephen Friedman after a dispute over the projected cost of the Iraq War. Lindsey estimated the cost of the Iraq War could reach $200 billion, while Defense Secretary Donald Rumsfeld estimated that it would cost less than $50 billion. The overall cost of the Iraq War has been estimated by the Congressional Budget Office to be approximately $2.4 trillion.

== Biography and achievements ==
Lindsey was born on July 18, 1954, in Peekskill, New York. He graduated from Lakeland Senior High School in Shrub Oak, New York, in 1972. An alumnus of Alpha Rho Upsilon fraternity at Bowdoin College, he received his A.B. magna cum laude and Phi Beta Kappa from Bowdoin and his A.M. and Ph.D. in economics from Harvard University.

During the Reagan administration, he served three years on the staff of the Council of Economic Advisers as senior staff economist for tax policy. He then served as special assistant to the president for policy development during the first Bush administration.

Lindsey served as a member of the Board of Governors of the Federal Reserve System for five years from November 1991 to February 1997. Additionally, Lindsey was chairman of the board of the Neighborhood Reinvestment Corporation, a national public/private community redevelopment organization, from 1993 until his departure from the Federal Reserve.

From 1997 to January 2001, Lindsey was a resident scholar and holder of the Arthur F. Burns Chair in Economics at the American Enterprise Institute in Washington, D.C. He was also managing director of Economic Strategies, an economic advisory service based in New York City. During 1999 and throughout 2000 he served as then-Governor George W. Bush's chief economic advisor for his presidential campaign. He is a former associate professor of economics at Harvard University.

Lindsey is chief executive officer of the Lindsey Group, which he runs with a former colleague from the National Economic Council and writes for The Wall Street Journal and other publications. He was a visiting scholar at the American Enterprise Institute.

== Writings ==
Lindsey is the author of four non-fiction books covering a variety of topics on economics and politics. In 2021, he released his first novel, Currency War, which postulates an economic war between the United States and China.

He has also contributed numerous articles to professional publications. His honors and awards include the Distinguished Public Service Award of the Boston Bar Association, 1994; an honorary degree from Bowdoin College, 1993; selection as a Citicorp/Wriston Fellow for Economic Research, 1988; and the Outstanding Doctoral Dissertation Award from the National Tax Association, 1985.

=== Nonfiction ===
- The Growth Experiment: How the New Tax Policy is Transforming the U.S. Economy (Basic Books, New York, 1990, ISBN 978-0465050703)
- Economic Puppetmasters: Lessons from the Halls of Power (AEI Press, Washington, D.C., 1999, ISBN 978-0844740812)
- What A President Should Know ...but most learn too late: An Insiders View On How To Succeed In The Oval Office (Rowman & Littlefield Publishers, Inc., Maryland, 2008, ISBN 978-0742562226)
- Conspiracies of the Ruling Class: How to Break Their Grip Forever (Simon & Schuster, 2016, ISBN 978-1501144233).

=== Fiction ===
- Currency War (Forefront Books, Nashville TN, 2021, ISBN 978-1637630013)

== Views ==
Lindsey is famous for spotting the emergence of the late 1990s U.S. stock market bubble back in 1996 while a Governor of the Federal Reserve. According to the meeting transcripts for September of that year, Lindsey challenged the expectation that corporate earnings would grow 11 1/2 percent a year continually. He said, "Readers of this transcript five years from now can check this fearless prediction: profits will fall short of this expectation." According to the Bureau of Economic Analysis, corporate profits as a share of national income eroded from 1997 until 2001. Stock prices eventually collapsed, starting their decline in March 2000, though the S&P500 remained above its 1996 level, casting doubt on the assertion that there was a stock market bubble in 1996.

In contrast to Chairman Greenspan, Lindsey argued that the Federal Reserve had an obligation to prevent the stock market bubble from growing out of control. He argued that "the long term costs of a bubble to the economy and society are potentially great.... As in the United States in the late 1920s and Japan in the late 1980s, the case for a central bank ultimately to burst that bubble becomes overwhelming. I think it is far better that we do so while the bubble still resembles surface froth and before the bubble carries the economy to stratospheric heights." During the 2000 Presidential campaign, Governor Bush was criticized for picking an economic advisor who had sold all of his stock in 1998.

According to The Washington Post, Lindsey was on an advisory board to Enron along with Paul Krugman before joining the White House. Lindsey and his colleagues warned Enron that the economic environment was riskier than they perceived.

=== Cost of the Iraq War ===
On September 15, 2002, in an interview with The Wall Street Journal, Lindsey estimated the high limit on the cost of the Bush administration's plan in 2002 of invasion and regime change in Iraq to be 1–2% of GNP, or about $100–$200 billion. Mitch Daniels, Director of the Office of Management and Budget, discounted this estimate as "very, very high" and Defense Secretary Donald Rumsfeld stated that the costs would be under $50 billion. Rumsfeld called Lindsey's estimate "baloney".

As of 2007 the cost of the invasion and occupation of Iraq exceeded $400 billion, and the Congressional Budget Office in August 2007 estimated that appropriations would eventually reach $1 trillion or more.

In October 2007, the Congressional Budget Office estimated that by 2017, the total costs of the wars in Iraq and Afghanistan could reach $2.4 trillion. In response, Democratic Representative Allen Boyd criticized the administration for firing Lindsey, saying "They found him a job outside the administration."

== Presidential campaign leadership ==
Lindsey has been a senior advisor to several Republican campaigns. He led the economic team for then Governor George W. Bush's successful presidential campaign in 2000, earning the trust of the future President who said at the time "I am very fond of Larry Lindsey and I value his advice". During the 2008 Presidential election, Lindsey served as Fred Thompson's Senior Economic Advisor. In 2012, Lindsey predicted on election day that Republican Mitt Romney would defeat President Obama. In April 2016, Lindsey endorsed Ted Cruz's campaign in the Republican presidential primary over his only remaining opponent, Donald Trump. Lindsey explained that Cruz was the best candidate because he had an economic program deserving of the "top grade".

Government offices
Preceded by Manuel H. Johnson	Member of the Federal Reserve Board of Governors; 1991–1997	Succeeded by Roger W. Ferguson Jr.
Political offices
Preceded by Gene Sperling	Director of the National Economic Council; 2001–2002	Succeeded by Steve Friedman
