= Committee on the Present Danger =

Series of US foreign policy interest groups

The Committee on the Present Danger (CPD) is the name used by a succession of American anti-communist foreign policy interest groups. Throughout its four iterations—in the 1950s, the 1970s, the 2000s, and 2019—it has influenced foreign policy since the administration of Harry S. Truman. Its first iteration disbanded as its leading members joined the Dwight Eisenhower administration, leading for it to be reformed in 1976 to counter the Soviet Union during the Cold War. This iteration achieved notable success during the Reagan administration. The third iteration was formed by veterans of the Cold War in 2004 in support of the war on terror. The fourth iteration, the Committee on the Present Danger: China (CPDC) returned the group to its anti-communist roots with a focus on the threat posed to the United States by the Chinese Communist Party.

== Overview ==
The committee first met in 1950, founded by Tracy Voorhees, to promote the plans proposed in NSC 68 by Paul Nitze and Dean Acheson. It lobbied the government directly and sought to influence public opinion through a publicity campaign, notably a weekly radio broadcast on the Mutual Broadcasting System throughout 1951. This iteration was effectively disbanded after 1952, following the appointment of Voorhees and others to senior positions in the administration.

It was privately revived in March 1976 to try to influence the presidential candidates and their advisors. After Jimmy Carter won the election, CPD went public again and spent the next four years lobbying, particularly against détente and the SALT II agreement. Its hawkish conclusions influenced the CIA's future reporting on the Soviet threat. This iteration of the CPD provided 33 officials to the Ronald Reagan administration, plus Reagan himself.

== History ==
=== First CPD (1950s) ===
On December 12, 1950, James Conant, Tracy Voorhees and Vannevar Bush announced the creation of the committee on the Present Danger. The group was formed in order to support the Truman Administration's remilitarization plans contained within NSC 68. The 'present danger' to which the group's title referred was "the aggressive designs of the Soviet Union", the CPD announced.

==== Members of the First CPD ====
- James B. Conant
- Tracy S. Voorhees
- Julius Ochs Adler
- Raymond B. Allen
- Frank Altschul
- Dillon Anderson
- James Phinney Baxter, III
- Laird Bell
- Barry Bingham
- Harry A. Bullis
- Vannevar Bush
- William L. Clayton
- Robert Cutler
- E.L. DeGolyer
- Harold Willis Dodds
- William J. Donovan
- David Dubinsky
- Leonard K. Firestone
- Truman K. Gibson Jr.
- Arthur J. Goldberg
- Samuel Goldwyn
- Paul G. Hoffman
- Stanley Marcus
- William C. Menninger
- Frederick A. Middlebush
- James L. Morrill
- Edward R. Murrow
- John Lord O'Brian
- Floyd B. Odlum
- J. Robert Oppenheimer
- Robert P. Patterson
- Howard C. Petersen
- Daniel A. Poling
- Stanley Resor
- Samuel Rosenman
- Theodore W. Schultz
- Robert E. Sherwood
- Robert G. Sproul
- Edmund A. Walsh, S.J.
- Henry M. Wriston
- J. D. Zellerbach

=== Second CPD (1970s) ===
On November 11, 1976, the second iteration was announced. The name of this version of the committee was "borrow[ed]" from the 1950s version, and was not a direct successor.

Some of its members lobbied for, and were members of, the 1976 Team B, providing an opposing view to the CIA's Team A.

Thirty-three officials of the Reagan administration were CPD members, including Director of Central Intelligence William Casey, National Security Advisor Richard V. Allen, United States Ambassador to the United Nations Jeane Kirkpatrick, Secretary of the Navy John Lehman, Secretary of State George Shultz, and Assistant Secretary of Defense Richard Perle. Reagan himself was a member in 1979.

==== Founding members of the second CPD ====
- Achilles, Theodore C.
- Allen, Richard V.
- Allison, John M.
- Anderson, Eugenie
- Beam, Jacob D.
- Bellow, Saul
- Bendetsen, Karl R.
- Burgess, W. Randolph
- Cabot, John M.
- Casey, William J,
- Chaikin, Sol C.
- Cline, Ray S.
- Colby, William E.
- Connally, John B.
- Connor, John T.
- Darden, Colgate W. Jr.
- Dean, Arthur H.
- Dillon, C. Douglas
- Dogole, S. Harrison
- Dominick, Peter H.
- Dowling, Walter
- DuBrow, Evelyn
- Farrell, James T.
- Fellman, David
- Fowler, Henry H.
- Frelinghuysen, Peter H. B.
- Glazer, Nathan
- Goodpaster, Andrew J.
- Grace, J. Peter
- Gray, Gordon
- Handlin, Oscar
- Hauser, Rita E.
- Hurewitz, J. C.
- Johnson, Chalmers
- Jordan, David C.
- Kampelman, Max M.
- Kemp, Geoffrey
- Keyserling, Leon H.
- Kirkland, Lane
- Kirkpatrick, Jeanne J.
- Kohler Foy D.
- Krogh, Peter
- Lefever, Ernest W.
- Lemnitzer, Lyman L.
- Libby, W. F.
- Lipset, Seymour Martin
- Lovestone, Jay
- Luce, Clare Boothe
- Martin, William McChesney Jr.
- McCabe, Edward A.
- McGhee, George C.
- McNair, Robert E.
- Morse, Joshua M.
- Muller, Steven
- Mulliken, Robert S.
- Myerson, Bess
- Nitze, Paul H.
- Olmsted, George
- Packard, David
- Podhoretz, Midge Decter
- Podhoretz, Norman
- Ramey, Estelle R.
- Ramsey, Paul
- Ridgway, Matthew B.
- Rostow, Eugene V.
- Rusk, Dean
- Rustin, Bayard
- Saltzman, Charles E.
- Scaife, Richard M.
- Schifter, Richard
- Seabury, Paul
- Shanker, Albert
- Tanham, George K.
- Taylor, Maxwell D.
- Teller, Edward
- Tyroler, Charles, II.
- Van Cleave, William R.
- Walker, Charls E.
- Wigner, Eugene P.
- Wilcox, Francis O.
- Wolfe, Bertram D.
- Zumwalt, Elmo R.

=== Third CPD (2004) ===
Logo of the third incarnation of the Committee on the Present Danger

In June 2004, The Hill reported that a third incarnation of CPD was being planned, to address the war on terrorism. This incarnation of the committee was still active as of 2008. The head of the 2004 CPD, PR pro and former Reagan adviser Peter D. Hannaford, explained, "we saw a parallel" between the Soviet threat and the threat from terrorism. The message that CPD will convey through lobbying, media work and conferences is that the war on terror needs to be won, he said.

Members of the 2004 CPD included Vice President for Policy Larry Haas, Senator Joseph I. Lieberman, former CIA director R. James Woolsey Jr., former National Security Advisor to Ronald Reagan, Robert C. McFarlane, and Reagan administration official and 1976 Committee founder Max Kampelman. At the July 20, 2004, launching of the 2004 CPD, Lieberman and Senator Jon Kyl were identified as the honorary co-chairs.

=== Fourth CPD (2019) ===
Logo of the Committee on the Present Danger: China

The fourth iteration of the Committee on the Present Danger was unveiled on March 25, 2019. The revived CPDC was focused on education and advocacy on a perceived existential and ideological threat posed by Communist China to the United States.

The relaunched organization was announced with Frank Gaffney, a former White House official under Ronald Reagan, playing a key role. Its stated aim is to "educate and inform American citizens and policymakers about the existential threats presented from the People's Republic of China under the misrule of the Chinese Communist Party". Between 2000 and 2023, there were 224 reported instances of Chinese espionage directed at the United States. The CPDC takes the view that there is "no hope of coexistence with China as long as the Communist Party governs the country". In a statement on the launch of the committee, the Population Research Institute stated: "The United States is in a new cold war. The Chinese Communist Party poses the greatest threat to both the United States and the world since the fall of the Soviet Union. Then, as now, the threat of a totalitarian regime with an evil ideology – one that is willing to kill 400 million of its own unborn children – must be stopped."

==== Members ====
The Committee on the Present Danger: China lists a variety of members including the former politicians and national security professionals, White House officials, business leaders, and others:

- Frank Gaffney
- Greg Autry
- Steve Bannon
- J. Kyle Bass
- William Bennett
- William G. Boykin
- Robert Charles
- Kenneth DeGraffenreid
- Paula DeSutter
- Nicholas Eftimiades
- Kevin Freeman
- Bob Fu
- Richard Fisher
- Mark Helprin
- Rosemary Gibson
- Steven L. Kwast
- Tidal McCoy
- Robert McEwen
- Thomas McInerney
- Steven W. Mosher
- Jay Lucas
- Scott Perry
- Benedict Peters
- Miles Prentice
- Suzanne Scholte
- Arthur Waldron
- Frank Wolf
- R. James Woolsey Jr.
- Yang Jianli

==== Criticisms ====
The CPDC has been criticized as promoting a revival of Red Scare politics in the United States, and for the involvement of Frank Gaffney and activist Steve Bannon. David Skidmore, writing for The Diplomat, described it as the latest instance of "what was once referred to as the 'military-industrial complex'" influencing policy. Charles W. Freeman Jr. at the Watson Institute called the CPDC "a Who's Who of contemporary wing-nuts, very few of whom have any expertise at all about China and most of whom represent ideological causes only peripherally connected to it."

== See also ==
- Citizens for a Free Kuwait
- Coalition for a Democratic Majority
- Committee for Peace and Security in the Gulf
- Committee for the Liberation of Iraq
- Foreign policy interest group
- Institute on Religion and Democracy
- Neoconservatism
- Red Scare
