= Dangerous Capabilities =

Book by David Callahan

Dangerous Capabilities: Paul Nitze and the Cold War
- Author: David Callahan
- Language: English
- Genre: Non-fiction
- Publisher: HarperCollins
- Publication date: 1990
- Publication place: United States
- Media type: Print
- Pages: 572
- ISBN: 978-0-06-016266-5
- OCLC: 21043635
- Followed by: Kindred Spirits: Harvard Business School's Extraordinary Class of 1949 and How They Transformed American Business (2002)

Dangerous Capabilities: Paul Nitze and the Cold War is a biography of Paul Nitze, the Cold War strategist and diplomat. It was published by HarperCollins in 1990 and written by David Callahan.

== Synopsis ==
Dangerous Capabilities offers a critical account of Nitze's role in debates within the United States government on policy toward the Soviet Union, nuclear weapons, and other national security issues. Nitze held a variety of high-level positions under eight different presidents, including Director of the State Department's Policy Planning Staff, Assistant Secretary of Defense for International Security Affairs, Secretary of the Navy, and Deputy Secretary of Defense. He also was a U.S. negotiator on the Strategic Arms Limitation Talks (SALT) and Intermediate-Range Nuclear Force (INF) talks.

Callahan faults Nitze for using his influence to accelerate the nuclear arms race and worsen relations with the Soviet Union. Callahan is particularly critical of Nitze's role in drafting NSC 68, an influential strategy document that Callahan says offered an inflated view of the Soviet threat unsupported by expert analysis of Soviet intentions. Callahan also faults Nitze for his central role in the 1958 Gaither Committee, which helped fuel erroneous fears of a "missile gap" that favored the Soviet Union. As well, Callahan provides a critical account of Nitze's role in Team-B, a competitive intelligence analysis to analyze threats posed by the Soviet Union, and his leadership in the Committee on the Present Danger, which warned of a Soviet edge in the Cold War competition.

Callahan offers a more positive account of Nitze's years as an arms control negotiator, where he worked hard to reach agreements with the Soviet Union to regulate and stabilize the nuclear arms race. In addition, Callahan notes Nitze's positive role in enacting the Marshall Plan to aid Western Europe after World War II.

== Reception ==
Dangerous Capabilities was published in September 1990 and widely reviewed. Larry Tool, writing in the San Francisco Chronicle said that "Dangerous Capabilities is not only the best book on Nitze, it is also one of the most searching and accessible accounts of American Cold War planning...The strength of Callahan's book is in its critical stance. He gives Nitze his due as a virtuoso bureaucrat, but confronts him at each stage of his career with the hard questions of his numerous critics." Former Pentagon official Lawrence Korb, writing in the Naval War College Review, said "Judged by even the most rigorous standards, Callahan has produced a remarkable book. In Dangerous Capabilities, he has given us a sweeping, authoritative, and readable history of the men, the ideas, and politics which formed American national security policy for the last fifty years." Joseph Nye, writing in the New York Times Book Review, called Dangerous Capabilities "An immensely readable account of a critical figure in the history of American foreign policy over the past 40 years."
