= War and Peace in the Nuclear Age =

1998 television series

War and Peace in the Nuclear Age is a 1989 PBS television series focusing on the effect of nuclear weapons development on international relations and warfare during the Cold War. The 13-part series was funded by the Annenberg/CPB Project and produced by WGBH in Boston in association with NHK and Central Independent Television. The New York Times called it "public television's equivalent of a nuclear explosion," praising it as "intelligently conceived and fastidiously balanced."

== Episodes ==
No.	Title	Air date	Description	Topics
1	"Dawn"	January 23, 1989	Scientists worldwide race to create nuclear weapons and be the first to use them in World War II.	Fascism, World War II, The Manhattan Project, The Blitz, Strategic bombing, Victory in Europe Day, Victory over Japan Day, Trinity (nuclear test), Atomic bombings of Hiroshima and Nagasaki
2	"The Weapon of Choice"	January 30, 1989	The United States and the Soviet Union, once allies, become Cold War adversaries.	Soviet atomic bomb project, Operation Crossroads, Greek Civil War, Marshall Plan, Operation Sandstone, 1948 Czechoslovak coup d'etat, Berlin Blockade, RDS-1, Thermonuclear weapon, Julius and Ethen Rosenberg, McCarthyism, Klaus Fuchs, Chinese Communist Revolution, Korean War
3	A Bigger Bang for the Buck	February 6, 1989	In the 1950s the United States begins to rely heavily on nuclear weapons for defense after the launch of the Soviet satellite Sputnik sparks fears of a "missile gap."	Presidency of Dwight D. Eisenhower, Tactical nuclear weapon, Massive retaliation, Lockheed U-2, Sputnik 1, Ballistic missile, 1960 U-2 Incident
4	Europe Goes Nuclear	February 13, 1989	France and England race to acquire nuclear weapons during the 1950s and 1960s; NATO worries about defending Europe from the threat from the East.	Atomic Energy Act of 1946, Atomic Energy Research Establishment, Operation Hurricane, French Indochina, Suez Crisis, Operation Grapple, Campaign for Nuclear Disarmament, May 1958 crisis in France, Gerboise Bleue, Canopus, Warsaw Pact, Hungarian Revolution of 1956
5	At the Brink	February 20, 1989	During the 1962 Cuban Missile Crisis, America and the Soviet Union are each close to initiating nuclear war.	Cuban Missile Crisis, Cuba/Soviet Union Relations, Bay of Pigs Invasion, Berlin Wall, Tsar Bomba
6	The Education of Robert McNamara	February 27, 1989	Robert S. McNamara confronts the spectre of nuclear war during his tenure as Secretary of Defense (1961-1968).	Strategic Rocket Forces, SM-62 Snark, SM-65 Atlas, North American XB-70 Valkyrie, Convair B-58 Hustler, LGM-30 Minuteman, Berlin Blockade, Flexible response, Counterforce, Nuclear triad, Assassination of John F. Kennedy, Nike Zeus, Nike-X, LIM-49 Spartan, Sprint, Anti-ballistic missile, 41 for Freedom, Yankee-class submarine
7	One Step Forward	March 6, 1989	As the U.S. and Soviet nuclear arsenals reach a rough parity, SALT I, the first arms control agreement, is negotiated.	Stanley R. Mickelsen Safeguard Complex, Strategic Arms Limitation Talks, Detente, Vietnam War, Linkage, Anti-ballistic missile, Safeguard program, MIRV, 1972 visit by Richard Nixon to China
8	The Haves and the Have Nots	March 13, 1989	A case study of the dynamics of nuclear proliferation—China, India and Pakistan race to acquire atomic weapons.	Nuclear weapons of Israel, Operation Opera, Nuclear proliferation, Atoms for Peace, India and weapons of mass destruction, International Atomic Energy Agency, China and weapons of mass destruction, Partial Nuclear Test Ban Treaty, Sino-Indian War, Indo-Pakistani War of 1971, 1973 Oil Crisis, Nuclear Non-Proliferation Act of 1978, Soviet-Afghan War
9	Carter's New World	March 20, 1989	Jimmy Carter's goals for his presidency include the reduction of nuclear weapons and improving America's relations with the Soviet Union.	Rockwell B-1 Lancer, Strategic Arms Limitation Talks, R-36 missile, First Strike (1979 film), LGM-118 Peacekeeper, Ogaden War, Visit by Den Xiaoping to the United States, Iran hostage crisis, Soviet-Afghan War
10	Zero Hour	March 27, 1989	Soviet leader Gorbachev accepts President Reagan's proposal for both sides to dismantle certain missiles.	MGM-31 Pershing, RSD-10 Pioneer, Neutron bomb, NATO Double-Track Decision, Cruise missile, Protect and Survive, Anti-nuclear protests, Strategic Defense Initiative, Intermediate-Range Nuclear Forces Treaty
11	Missile Experimental	April 3, 1989	Supporters and critics of the MX missile discuss its role and how it could best be used.	LGM-118 Peacekeeper, SM-65 Atlas, LGM-30 Minuteman, Launch on Warning, Peacekeeper Rail Garrison, Air-launched ballistic missile, Strategic Arms Limitation Talks, Dense Pack, Nuclear Triad, MGM-134 Midgetman
12	Reagan's Shield	April 10, 1989	President Reagan supports the Strategic Defense Initiative as a means of eliminating the threat of nuclear attack.	Strategic Defense Initiative, Railgun, Nuclear Freeze Campaign, Safeguard Program, Korean Air Lines Flight 007, Moscow Summit (1988), Airborne Laser, Evil Empire Speech
13	Visions of War & Peace	April 17, 1989	Nations face the challenge of resolving disputes without nuclear weapons or physical force.	Early-warning radar, Glasnost, Mikhail Gorbachev, First Strike (nuclear strategy), Nuclear proliferation

== Interviews ==
The program features interviews throughout with the following individuals.

Abdul Sattar	George Whelan Anderson, Jr.	Petra Kelly
Agha Shahi	Georgy Arbatov	Phillip Morrison
Albert Carnesale	Gerald E. Miller	Pierre Marie Gallois
Albert Wohlstetter	Gerd Schmuckle	Pierre Messmer
Aleksandr Bovin	Glenn T. Seaborg	Raja Ramanna
Alexander Alexeyev	Han Xu	Randall Forsberg
Alun Gwynne Jones, Baron Chalfont	Hans Apel	Ray S. Cline
Andrei Gromyko	Hans Bethe	Raymond L. Garthoff
Andrew Goodpaster	Harold Brown	Richard C. Hottelet
Ash Carter	Harry Rowen	Richard Nixon
Bernard T. Feld	Helmut Schmidt	Richard Perle
Bernard W. Rogers	Henry Kissinger	Richard Pipes
Bertrand Goldschmidt	Henry M. Jackson	Roald Sagdeev
Carl Friedrich von Weizsacker	Herbert York	Robert McNamara
Caspar Weinberger	Homi Sethna	Robert R. Bowie
Chester Victor Clifton, Jr.	Isidor Isaac Rabi	Roger Hilsman
Clark Clifford	Jack Ruina	Roger Makins, 1st Baron Sherfield
Cyrus Vance	James A. Abrahamson	Roswell Gilpatric
David L. Aaron	James Callaghan	Royal B. Allison
David M. Jones	James R. Schlesinger	Rudolf Peierls
David Owen	Jerome Wiesner	Russell E. Dougherty
David Powers	Jimmy Carter	Sergey Kapitsa
Dean Rusk	John Eisenhower	Sidney Drell
Denis Healey	Joseph Nye	Subramanian Swamy
Donald Soper	K. Subrahmanyam	Ted Sorensen
E. P. Thompson	Kenneth Nichols	Thomas Hinman Moorer
Edward Teller	Lakshmi Kant Jha	Valentin Falin
Egon Bahr	Leslie H. Gelb	Victor Weisskopf
Eugene Carroll	Lew Allen	Vladimir Lomeiko
Evgeny Velikhov	Lynn E. Davis	Vladimir Semyonov
Frank A. Camm	Maurice Schumann	Wilhelm Grewe
Frank Roberts	McGeorge Bundy	William Kaufmann
Gennadi Gerasimov	Morarji Desai	William T. Fairbourn
George A. Keyworth II	Norman Cousins	William Van Cleave
George Ball	Norris Bradbury	Wolf Graf von Baudissin
George Bunn	Paul Nitze	Zbigniew Brzezinski
George Shultz	Paul Warnke	
