= Tyroler =

Tyroler is a surname. Notable people with the surname include:

- Alexandru Tyroler (1891–1973), Hungarian-Romanian chess master
- Charles Tyroler II (1915–1995), American politician
