= John Newhouse =

American journalist and author

- Born: February 6, 1929; East Orange, New Jersey
- Died: December 10, 2016 (aged 87); Washington, D.C.
- Occupation: Journalist
- Known for: War and Peace in the Nuclear Age (book – related to PBS television series)

Wilfred John Newhouse (February 6, 1929 – December 10, 2016) was an American journalist and author. He was best known as the author of the book War and Peace in the Nuclear Age, published in 1989 as companion to a PBS television series.

== Early life ==
Newhouse graduated from Duke University in 1950, after which he served two years in the United States Air Force. After his discharge, Newhouse took a job as a copy boy for the United Press wire service in New York. He lived in Paris in the 50s and 60s.

== Career ==
Newhouse was an American journalist, an author of nine books and a civil servant whose work spanned over fifty years. He worked for Collier's magazine, a popular weekly in the 1950s; authored numerous books on diplomacy, history, and later the airline industry. As Collier’s ceased publication in 1957, Newhouse worked in broadcast journalism with ABC News and was sent in 1958 to Beirut to cover the military operation of the U.S. Marines. He is considered the preeminent historian on SALT I, the strategic arms limitation talks that took place between 1969 and 1972 and resulted in the Anti-Ballistic Missile Treaty, for his book Cold Dawn.

In 1980, Newhouse joined the staff of the New Yorker where he wrote about diplomacy, arms control, and current affairs as well as profiles of prominent figures including Hussein, King of Jordan, and former U.S. Senator Alan K. Simpson. During his career in journalism, Newhouse also wrote about the influence of foreign lobbies on us politics for Foreign Affairs magazine. He also had a second career as a government official with the United States Senate Committee on Foreign Relations, the Arms Control and Disarmament Agency and the United States State Department. At this department, he was a negotiator of the Strategic Arms Limitation Talks (SALT) II. After five years on the committee, the Ford Foundation offered Newhouse a grant to live, study and write in Paris about European issues.

== Publications ==
=== Books ===
- US Troops in Europe: Issues, Costs and Choices. (1972).
- Cold Dawn – The Story of Salt. (1973). John Newhouse.
- The Nuclear Age: From Hiroshima to Star Wars. (1989).
- Imperial America: The Bush Assault on World Order. (September 14, 2004).
- De Gaulle and the Anglo-Saxons. (De Gaulle and the Anglo-Saxons). (April 29, 1970)
- Europe Adrift. (1997).
- War And Peace In The Nuclear Age. (1989).
- The Sporty Game: The High-Risk Competitive Business of Making and Selling Commercial Airliners. (1982).
- Boeing versus Airbus: The Inside Story of the Greatest International Competition in Business. (2008).
