= Richard Pipes =

American historian (1923–2018)

- Ryszard Pipes
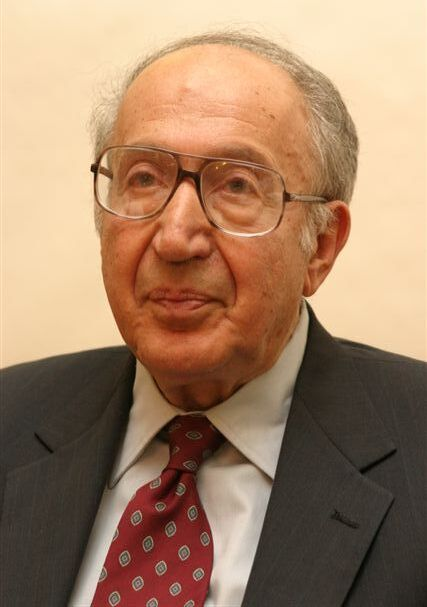
- Pipes in 2004
- Born: Richard Edgar Pipes; July 11, 1923; Cieszyn, Poland
- Died: May 17, 2018 (aged 94); Cambridge, Massachusetts, U.S.
- Citizenship: Poland (1923–1943); United States (after 1943)
- Occupation: Historian
- Spouse: Irene Eugenia Roth (m. 1946)
- Children: 2, including Daniel
- Awards: National Humanities Medal

Academic background
- Education: Muskingum College; Cornell University; Harvard University
- Doctoral advisor: Michael Karpovich

Academic work
- Sub-discipline: Russian history
- Doctoral students: John V. A. Fine, Anna Geifman, Abbott Gleason, Edward L. Keenan, Peter Kenez, Eric Lohr, Michael Stanislawski, Richard Stites, Lee In-ho

Richard Edgar Pipes (Polish: Ryszard Pipes; July 11, 1923 – May 17, 2018) was an American historian and Sovietologist who specialized in Russian and Soviet history. Pipes was a frequent interviewee in the press on the matters of Soviet history and foreign affairs. His writings also appear in Commentary, The New York Times, and The Times Literary Supplement.

At Harvard University, Pipes taught large courses on Imperial Russia as well as the Russian Revolution and guided over 80 graduate students to their PhDs. In 1976, he headed Team B, a team of analysts organized by the Central Intelligence Agency (CIA), which analyzed the strategic capacities and goals of the Soviet military and political leadership. From 1981 to 1982, he served as an advisor on Eastern Bloc matters to President Ronald Reagan. Pipes is the father of American historian Daniel Pipes.

== Early life and education ==
Richard Pipes was born in Cieszyn, Poland to an assimilated Jewish family (whose name had originally been spelled "Piepes" in German spelling, which in pronunciation is the same as the Polish spelling "Pipes" [ˈpipɛs]). His father Marek Pipes was a businessman and a Polish legionnaire during World War I. He was a co-owner of the chocolate factory Dea in Cieszyn, before he moved to Warsaw in 1929. During the time Pipes attended the Synagoga Ahawat Tora on Michejda Street. By Pipes's own account, during his childhood and youth, he never thought about the Soviet Union; the major cultural influences on him were Polish and German.

Aged sixteen, Pipes saw Adolf Hitler at Marszałkowska Street in Warsaw during Hitler's victory tour after the Invasion of Poland. The Pipes family fled occupied Poland in October 1939 and arrived in the United States in July 1940, after seven months passing through Italy.

Pipes became a naturalized citizen of the United States in 1943 while serving in the United States Army Air Corps. He was educated at Muskingum College, Cornell University, and Harvard University. In October 1944, Pipes was sent to Camp Ritchie, Maryland, to receive training in psychological warfare.

== Career ==
Pipes taught at Harvard University from 1958 until his retirement in 1996. He was the director of Harvard's Russian Research Center from 1968 to 1973 and later Baird Professor Emeritus of History at Harvard University. In 1962 he delivered a series of lectures on Russian intellectual history at Leningrad State University. He acted as senior consultant at the Stanford Research Institute from 1973 to 1978. During the 1970s, he was an advisor to Washington Senator Henry M. Jackson. In 1981 and 1982 he served as a member of the National Security Council, holding the post of Director of East European and Soviet Affairs under President Ronald Reagan. He also became head of the Nationalities Working Group. Pipes was a member of the Committee on the Present Danger from 1977 until 1992 and belonged to the Council of Foreign Relations. He also attended two Bilderberg Meetings, at both of which he lectured. In the 1970s, Pipes was a leading critic of détente, which he described as "inspired by intellectual indolence and based on ignorance of one's antagonist and therefore inherently inept".

=== Team B ===
Pipes was head of the 1976 Team B, composed of civilian experts and retired military officers and agreed to by then-CIA director George H. W. Bush at the urging of the president's Foreign Intelligence Advisory Board (PFIAB) as a competitive analysis exercise. Team B was created at the instigation of then Secretary of Defense Donald Rumsfeld as an antagonist force to a group of CIA intelligence officials known as Team A. His hope was that it would produce a much more aggressive assessment of Soviet Union military capabilities. Unsurprisingly, it argued that the National Intelligence Estimate on the Soviet Union, generated yearly by the CIA, underestimated both Soviet military strategy and ambition and misinterpreted Soviet strategic intentions.

Team B faced criticism. The international relations journalist Fred Kaplan writes that Team B "turns out to have been wrong on nearly every point." Pipes's group insisted that the Soviet Union, as of 1976, maintained "a large and expanding Gross National Product," and argued that the CIA belief that economic chaos hindered the USSR's defenses was a ruse on the part of the USSR. One CIA employee called Team B "a kangaroo court".

Pipes called Team B's evidence "soft." Team B came to the conclusion that the Soviets had developed several new weapons, featuring a nuclear-armed submarine fleet that used a system that did not depend on active sonar, and was thus undetectable by existing technology.

According to Pipes, "Team B was appointed to look at the evidence and to see if we could conclude that the actual Soviet strategy is different from ours, i.e. the strategy of Mutual Assured Destruction (MAD). It has now been demonstrated totally that it was". In 1986, Pipes maintained that Team B contributed to creating more realistic defense estimates.

In what was meant to be an "off-the-record" interview, Pipes told Reuters in March 1981 that "Soviet leaders would have to choose between peacefully changing their Communist system in the direction followed by the West or going to war. There is no other alternative and it could go either way – Détente is dead." Pipes also stated in the interview that Foreign Minister Hans-Dietrich Genscher of West Germany was susceptible to pressure from the Russians. It was learned independently that Pipes was the official who spoke to Reuters. This potentially jeopardized Pipes' job. The White House and the "incensed" State Department issued statements repudiating Pipes' comments.

=== Writings on Russian history ===
Pipes wrote many books on Russian history, including Russia under the Old Regime (1974), The Russian Revolution (1990), and Russia Under the Bolshevik Regime (1994), and was a frequent interviewee in the press on the matters of Soviet history and foreign affairs. His writings also appear in Commentary, The New York Times, and The Times Literary Supplement. At Harvard, he taught large courses on Imperial Russia as well as the Russian Revolution and guided over 80 graduate students to their PhDs.

Pipes is known for arguing that the origins of the Soviet Union can be traced to the separate path taken by 15th-century Muscovy, in a Russian version of the Sonderweg thesis. In Pipes' opinion, Muscovy differed from every other State in Europe in that it had no concept of private property, and that everything was regarded as the property of the Grand Duke/Tsar. In Pipes' view, this separate path undertaken by Russia (possibly under Mongol influence) ensured that Russia would be an autocratic state with values fundamentally dissimilar from those of Western civilization. Pipes argued that this "patrimonialism" of Imperial Russia started to break down when Russian leaders attempted to modernize in the 19th century, without seeking to change the basic "patrimonial" structure of Russian society. In Pipes's opinion, this separate course undertaken by Russia over the centuries made Russia uniquely open to revolution in 1917. Pipes strongly criticized the values of the radical intelligentsia of late Imperial Russia for what he sees as their fanaticism and inability to accept reality. Pipes stressed that the Soviet Union was an expansionist, totalitarian state bent on world conquest. He is also known for the thesis that, contrary to many traditional histories of the Soviet Union at the time, the October Revolution was, rather than a popular general uprising, a coup under false slogans foisted upon the majority of the Russians by a tiny segment of the population driven by a select group of radical intellectuals, who subsequently established a one-party dictatorship that was intolerant and repressive from the start.

In 1992, Pipes served as an expert witness in the Constitutional Court of Russia's trial of the Communist Party of the Soviet Union.

== Reception ==
His writing has provoked discussions in the academic community, for example in The Russian Review among several others. Among members of this school, Lynne Viola and Sheila Fitzpatrick write that Pipes focused too narrowly on intellectuals as causal agents. Peter Kenez, a former PhD student of Pipes', argued that Pipes approached Soviet history as a prosecutor, intent solely on proving the criminal intent of the defendant, to the exclusion of anything else, and described Pipes as a researcher of "great reputation" but with passionate anti-communist views.

Other critics have written that Pipes wrote at length about what Pipes described as Vladimir Lenin's unspoken assumptions and conclusions while neglecting what Lenin actually said. Alexander Rabinowitch writes that whenever a document can serve Pipes' long-standing crusade to demonize Lenin, Pipes commented on it at length; if the document allows Lenin to be seen in a less negative light, Pipes passed over it without comment. Pipes' critics argued that his historical writings perpetuated the Soviet Union as "evil empire" narrative in an attempt "to put the clock back a few decades to the times when Cold War demonology was the norm." Diane P. Koenker described The Russian Revolution as having a "fundamentally reactionary" perspective that presents a sympathetic view of imperial forces and depicted Lenin as a "single-minded, ruthless and cowardly intellectual".

Following the demise of the USSR, Pipes charged the revisionists with skewing their research, by means of statistics, to support their preconceived ideological interpretation of events, which made the results of their research "as unreadable as they were irrelevant for the understanding of the subject," to provide intellectual cover for Soviet terror and acting as simpletons and/or communist dupes. He also stated that their attempt at "history from below" only obfuscated the fact that "Soviet citizens were the helpless victims of a totalitarian regime driven primarily by a lust for power."

== Honors ==
Pipes had an extensive list of honors, including: Honorary Consul of the Republic of Georgia, Foreign Member of the Polish Academy of Learning (PAU), Commander's Cross of Merit of the Republic of Poland, Honorary DHL at Adelphi College, Honorary LLD at Muskingum College, Doctor Honoris Causa from the University of Silesia, Szczecin University, and the University of Warsaw. Honorary Doctor of Political Science from the Tbilisi (Georgia) School of Political Studies. Annual Spring Lecturer of the Norwegian Nobel Peace Institute, Walter Channing Cabot Fellow of Harvard University, Fellow of the American Academy of Arts and Sciences, Fellow of the Center for Advanced Study in the Behavioral Sciences, Guggenheim Fellow (twice), Fellow of the American Council of Learned Societies and recipient of the George Louis Beer Prize of the American Historical Association. He was a member of the Board of Advisors of the National Committee on American Foreign Policy. He served on a number of editorial boards including that of the International Journal of Intelligence and CounterIntelligence. He received one of the 2007 National Humanities Medals and in 2009 he was awarded both the Truman-Reagan Medal of Freedom by the Victims of Communism Memorial Foundation and the Brigham–Kanner Property Rights Prize by the William & Mary Law School. In 2010, Pipes received the medal "Bene Merito" awarded by the Polish Minister of Foreign Affairs. From 2010 to 2014, he participated in the annual Valdai Discussion Club.

He was a member of the advisory council of the Victims of Communism Memorial Foundation.

== Personal life ==
Pipes married Irene Eugenia Roth in 1946; the couple had two children, Daniel and Steven. Their son Daniel Pipes is a scholar of Middle Eastern affairs.

Pipes died in Cambridge, Massachusetts on May 17, 2018, at the age of 94.

== Works ==
External videos
- "Russia: The More Things Change, The More They Stay the Same." Interview on The Open Mind, 1990.
- Presentation by Pipes on The Unknown Lenin, November 22, 1996, C-SPAN
- Presentation by Pipes on Property and Freedom, December 13, 1999, C-SPAN
- Interview with Pipes, conducted by William F. Buckley Jr., on Communism: A History, November 1, 2001, C-SPAN
- Booknotes interview with Pipes on Vixi: Memoirs of a Non-Belonger, December 7, 2003, C-SPAN

Author

- The Formation of the Soviet Union, Communism and Nationalism, 1917–1923 (1954)
- Social Democracy and the St. Petersburg Labor Movement, 1885–1897 (1963)
- Struve, Liberal on the Left (1970)
- Europe Since 1815 (1970)
- Europe Since 1500 (1971) With J.H. Hexter and A. Molho
- Russia Under the Old Regime (1974)
- Soviet Strategy in Europe (1976)
- Struve, Liberal on the Right, 1905–1944 (1980)
- U.S.-Soviet Relations in the Era of Détente: a Tragedy of Errors (1981)
- Survival is Not Enough: Soviet Realities and America's Future (1984)
- Russia Observed: Collected Essays on Russian and Soviet History (1989)
- The Russian Revolution (1990) (Audiobook)
- Russia Under the Bolshevik Regime: 1919–1924 (1993)
- Communism, the Vanished Specter (1994)
- A Concise History of the Russian Revolution (1995)
- The Three "Whys" of the Russian Revolution (1995)
- Property and Freedom (1999)
- Communism: A History (2001) (Audiobook)
- Vixi: Memoirs of a Non-Belonger (2003)
- The Degaev Affair: Terror and Treason in Tsarist Russia (2003)
- Russian Conservatism and Its Critics (2006)
- Scattered Thoughts (2010)
- Russia's Itinerant Painters (2011)
- Uvarov: A Life (2013) (In Russian)
- Alexander Yakovlev: The Man Whose Ideas Delivered Russia from Communism (2015)

Editor

- The Russian Intelligentsia (1961)
- Revolutionary Russia (1968)
- The Unknown Lenin: From the Secret Archive (1996)

Contributor

- "The National Problem in Russia." In: Readings in Russian Civilization (1969)
- "The Communist System." In: The Soviet System: From Crisis to Collapse (1995)

Essays

- "The Russian Military Colonies, 1810–1831." The Journal of Modern History, Vol. 22, No. 3, September 1950, pp. 205–219. JSTOR 1871751.
- "The First Experiment in Soviet National Policy: The Bashkir Republic, 1917–1920." The Russian Review, Vol. 9, No. 4, October 1950, pp. 303–319. doi:10.2307/125989. JSTOR 125989.
- "The Trial of Vera Z." Russian History, Vol. 37, No. 1, 2010, pp. v, vii–x, 1–3, 5–31, 33–49, 51–82. JSTOR 24664570.

== Filmography ==
- War and Peace in the Nuclear Age (documentary mini-series). Episode 12: “Reagan Reagan’s Shield”. WGBH, 1989.
- History’s Mysteries (documentary series). “Killer Submarine”. History Channel, 2001.
- Beyond the Movie – The Lord of the Rings: Return of the King. National Geographic, 2003.
- The Power of Nightmares: The Rise of the Politics of Fear (documentary mini-series). Episode 1: “Baby It’s Cold Outside”. Written and directed by Adam Curtis. 2004.
