= Kenneth E. deGraffenreid =

American academic

Kenneth E. deGraffenreid is a former American national security officer and academic who is an expert on U.S. intelligence activities. He was professor of intelligence studies at The Institute of World Politics from 1992 to 2012 when he retired to emeritus status in 2012. deGraffenreid has worked in the highest echelons of the United States Intelligence Community with The New Yorker reporting in 2004 that he was responsible for all the Department of Defense's Special Access Programs (SAPs).

He is a leading authority in intelligence, foreign propaganda, information warfare, and counterintelligence. He was an early pioneer in the academic sub-discipline of intelligence studies which was in its nascency when he began teaching in 1992.

== Education ==
deGraffenreid graduated from Purdue University in 1967, and earned an M.A. in National Security Studies and International Relations from the Catholic University of America in 1967. He started, but did not finish, work for a PhD degree. However, he did receive an honorary doctorate from the Institute of World Politics in Washington, DC in 2014.

== Career ==
deGraffenreid served in the U.S. Navy as a naval aviator and intelligence officer for 10 years before retiring as a captain in the Naval Reserve. At retirement, he was assigned to the executive panel of the Chief of Naval Operations. He then served as a Special Project Director with the National Strategy Information Center, a public policy institution dedicated to improving educational efforts in the field of national security.

For four years, deGraffenreid served on the professional minority staff of the Senate Select Committee on Intelligence where he had responsibilities related to national intelligence activities and programs. He did legislative work and conducted a study of the security implications of Soviet intelligence activities directed at U.S. arms control monitoring capabilities. Following the election of Ronald Reagan in 1980, he participated on the Central Intelligence Agency transition team and in drafting the new administration's program for intelligence reform.

deGraffenreid was Senior Director of Intelligence Programs at the National Security Council from 1981 to 1987. On January 23, 1984, he was additionally named a special assistant to the president for national security affairs. He assisted the National Security Advisor in evaluating and coordinating intelligence, counterintelligence, security countermeasures, space policy, arms control, strategic nuclear, and command, control and communication issues coming before the president and the National Security Council. In this capacity, he became an expert in the case of Vladimir Vetrov. In 1988, a report he contributed to at the Consortium for the Study of Intelligence, part of the National Strategic Information Center, called for reform and modernization of American intelligence capabilities.

For three years he was a senior vice president with JAYCOR, a California-based research, development, and systems engineering firm. At the firm's Vienna, Virginia office he led the Strategic Programs and Analysis Group, a 180-person group working in the areas of intelligence, security, verification, counter-proliferation, strategic offensive and defensive analysis, operations security, and special operations.

From 1994 to 1999 deGraffenreid was senior associate and then vice president of National Security Research, Inc., where he was responsible for national-level U.S. intelligence and counterintelligence policies and programs, and security programs for protecting U.S. Government and commercial strategic information and operations.

For two years he was also vice president of policy-analysis firm National Security Concepts based in the Washington, D.C., area. He directed intelligence and defense policy and program analysis in projects ranging from missile defense support to information warfare to specialized security programs.

From 2001 to 2004 deGraffenreid was the Deputy Under Secretary of Defense for Policy Support in the Department of Defense and, from 2004 to 2005, he served as Deputy National Counterintelligence Executive to the NCIX Michelle van Cleave (who also lectured at The Institute of World Politics for many years). He was part of the foreign policy and national security team for the Newt Gingrich 2012 presidential campaign.

He was also a senior fellow at the International Assessment and Strategy Center.

At the Institute of World Politics, he taught a number of courses during his tenure (1992–2012) including: Strategic Information Warfare (which was one of the first unclassified courses to be taught on this subject on any American campus when he first offered it in 1996), American Counterintelligence and Security for the 21st Century, American Intelligence and Protective Security: An Advanced Seminar, Intelligence and Policy, Intelligence Collection, and Introduction to Intelligence. He was also one of the founding faculty members and board members of the institute.

deGraffenreid served on the board of directors of the OPSEC Professionals Society and Center for Security Policy in Washington, D.C., and on the advisory board for the master's degree in Intelligence offered by the New York Institute of Technology.

He has contributed op-eds to various newspapers including The Washington Post, and chapters to various books, including Intelligence Requirements in the 1990s, and he edited the public version of the Cox Report concerning espionage by the People's Republic of China. He was also a frequent guest commentator on television programs including ABC's Nightline, PBS's MacNeil-Lehrer Newshour, CNN's Crossfire, and the Fox News Channel.

He is a member of the Committee on the Present Danger (China). He has been awarded the Distinguished Civilian Service Award and the Exceptional Meritorious Civilian Service Medal by the Department of Defense.

== Personal life ==
A native of the Chicago area, deGraffenreid is the father of two children and lived near Annapolis, Maryland until his retirement move to Maine.
