= International Assessment and Strategy Center =

US-based think tank

- Formation: 2004
- Type: 501(c)(3) organization
- Tax ID no.: 20-1175831
- Headquarters: Alexandria, Virginia
- Official language: English
- Revenue: $144,727 (2014)
- Expenses: $264,549 (2014)
- Website: www.strategycenter.net

The International Assessment and Strategy Center is a United States–based think tank whose declared purpose is to analyze "medium and long-term security issues and their impact on the security of the United States and her key interests and allies." Headquartered in Alexandria, Virginia, the Center undertakes both open source and classified work on behalf of United States government agencies, and non-governmental organizations. Officially non-partisan, the Center's policy orientation has been generally geared toward a "robust national security posture".

== Current and former staff ==
- Jeffrey Breinholt
- Kenneth E. deGraffenreid
- Douglas Farah
- Arthur Waldron
- Glenn R. Simpson
