= Paul Seabury =

American historian

- Born: May 6, 1923; Hempstead, New York, U.S.
- Died: October 17, 1990 (aged 67); Pinole, California, U.S.
- Education: Swarthmore College; Columbia University (PhD)
- Occupations: Political scientist; foreign policy consultant
- Awards: Bancroft Prize (1964)

Paul Seabury (May 6, 1923 – October 17, 1990) was an American political scientist and foreign policy consultant.

== Life ==
Born in Hempstead, Long Island, Seabury was a native New Yorker. He graduated from Swarthmore College in 1946, and from Columbia University with a Ph.D. He taught at the University of California, Berkeley starting in 1953. Once a national official of the liberal Americans for Democratic Action, after the tumultuous era of student revolt at Berkeley, he became a leading spokesman for the first American neo-conservatives. He was part of the Consortium for the Study of Intelligence, which fostered intelligence studies in American universities.

In 1984, Seabury edited and contributed to "The Grenada Papers," an analysis that praised the United States invasion of Grenada and argued for U.S. action against Nicaragua and guerrilla movements in El Salvador and Guatemala. He served on the President's Foreign Intelligence Advisory Board during the Reagan Administration. Seabury sat on the Board of Directors of the Committee on the Present Danger.

He married Marie-Anne Phelps; they had two sons. His papers are held at the Hoover Institution. He died in Pinole, California. Seabury was a great player of croquet, and edited a book on the game for Abercrombie and Fitch.

== Awards ==
- 1964 Bancroft Prize
- 1961-62 Guggenheim Fellowship

== Works ==
- "The Banality of Liberalism", The New York Review of Books, November 11, 1965
- Michael Curtis, ed. (1986). "Reviewing the United Nations". The Middle East reader. Transaction Publishers. ISBN 978-0-88738-101-0.
- "Trendier than thou: the many temptations of the Episcopal Church", Harper's Magazine, 1978
- The Wilhelmstrasse, University of California Press, 1954
- Power, Freedom, and Diplomacy, Random House, 1963
- The Balance of Power, Chandler Pub. Co., 1965
- The Rise and Decline of the Cold War, Basic Books, 1967
- Edward Friedland; Paul Seabury; Aaron B. Wildavsky (1975). The Great Detente Disaster: Oil and the Decline of American Foreign Policy. Basic Books. ISBN 978-0-465-02707-1.
- Paul Seabury; Walter A. McDougall (1984). The Grenada Papers. Institute for Contemporary Studies. ISBN 978-0-917616-67-9.
- Angelo Codevilla; Paul Seabury (1989). War: Ends and Means. Basic Books. ISBN 978-0-465-09067-9. (2nd edition Brassey's, 2006, ISBN 978-1-57488-610-8)
