= Team B =

CIA group that analyzed the strategic goals of the USSR

Team B was a competitive analysis exercise commissioned by the Central Intelligence Agency (CIA) to analyze threats the Soviet Union posed to the security of the United States. It was created, in part, due to a 1974 publication by Albert Wohlstetter, who accused the CIA of chronically underestimating Soviet military capability. Years of National Intelligence Estimates (NIE) that were later demonstrated to be very wrong were another motivating factor.

President Gerald Ford began the Team B project in May 1976, inviting a group of outside experts to evaluate classified intelligence on the Soviet Union. Team B, approved by then-director of Central Intelligence George H. W. Bush, was composed of "outside experts" who attempted to counter the arguments of intelligence officials within the CIA. The intelligence community was in the process of putting together its own assessment at the same time.

United States and Soviet Union/Russia nuclear stockpiles. The Soviets strove for "nuclear superiority", especially in terms of numbers of ICBMs beginning in the 1970s, which in an oral history project conducted years later, was intended to overtake Washington.

Team B concluded that the NIE on the Soviet Union, compiled and produced annually by the CIA, chronically underestimated Soviet military power and misinterpreted Soviet strategic intentions. Its findings were leaked to the press shortly after Jimmy Carter's 1976 presidential election win in an attempt to appeal to staunch anticommunists in both parties and also not to appear partisan. The Team B reports became the intellectual foundation for the idea of "the window of vulnerability" and of the massive arms buildup that began toward the end of the Carter administration and accelerated under President Ronald Reagan.

Some scholars and policy-makers, including Anne Hessing Cahn of the Arms Control and Disarmament Agency, later criticized the Team B project's findings. Many of these experts argued that the findings were grossly inaccurate.

== Creation ==
A number of conservative foreign policy intellectuals worried that the U.S. was sacrificing strategic position in the early 1970s by embracing détente. In response, Albert Wohlstetter, a professor at the University of Chicago, accused the CIA of systematically underestimating Soviet missile deployment in his 1974 Foreign Policy article, "Is There a Strategic Arms Race?" Wohlstetter concluded that the United States was allowing the Soviet Union to achieve military superiority by not closing a perceived missile gap. Many conservatives then began concerted attacks on the CIA's annual assessment of the Soviet threat.

President Ford's Chief of Staff Donald Rumsfeld started making speeches arguing that the Soviets were ignoring Secretary of State Henry Kissinger's treaties and secretly building up their weapons so that they could eventually attack the United States. Rumsfeld used his influence to persuade Ford to set up an independent inquiry. Rumsfeld and Paul Wolfowitz wanted to create a much less charitable picture of the Soviet Union, its intentions, and its views about fighting and winning a nuclear war. The organization chosen by the Ford administration to challenge the CIA's analysis was the President's Foreign Intelligence Advisory Board (PFIAB).

In 1975, PFIAB members asked CIA Director William Colby to approve a project that would result in comparative assessments of the Soviet threat. Colby refused, stating it was hard "to envisage how an ad hoc independent group of analysts could prepare a more thorough, comprehensive assessment of Soviet strategic capabilities than could the intelligence community." Colby was removed from his position in the November 1975 Halloween Massacre; Ford has stated that he had made the decision alone, but the historiography of the "Halloween Massacre" appears to support the allegations that Rumsfeld had successfully lobbied for this.

When George H. W. Bush became the Director of Central Intelligence in 1976, the PFIAB renewed its request for comparative threat assessments. Although his top analysts argued against such an undertaking, Bush checked with the White House, obtained a go-ahead, and by May 26 had signed off on the experiment. A team of 16 "outside experts" were to take an independent look at highly classified data used by the intelligence community to assess Soviet strategic forces in the yearly National Intelligence Estimates.

There were three teams:

- One studied Soviet low-altitude air defense capabilities,
- Another examined Soviet intercontinental ballistic missile (ICBM) accuracy, and
- The third investigated Soviet strategic policy and objectives.

It was the third team, chaired by Harvard University professor Richard Pipes, that ultimately received the most publicity. It is now referred to as Team B.

=== Members ===
PFIAB's Team B was headed by Richard Pipes, a Harvard historian and specialist in Russian history. Team B's members included Daniel O. Graham, Thomas Wolf, John Vogt, and William Van Cleave. Advisers included Foy D. Kohler, Seymour Weiss, Jasper Welch, Paul Wolfowitz, and Paul Nitze, who had been instrumental in the creation of the Committee on the Present Danger (CPD) in 1950. Its objectives were to raise awareness about the Soviets' alleged nuclear dominance and to pressure American leaders to close the missile gap.

Team B's work continued into the 1990s, with an influential report led by Michael D. Griffin being published by the Heritage Foundation. The report proposed a space-based ballistic missile shield and recommended the U.S. terminate the Anti-Ballistic Missile Treaty. George W. Bush left the ABMT in 2001, and other recommendations were put into practice with Griffin's Space Development Agency and the Golden Dome (missile defense system).

=== Detailed sections ===
==== Part One ====
- Judgments of Soviet Strategic Objectives Underlying NIE's and their Shortcomings

The first section of the report dealt with the team's criticisms of the NIE's assessment of Soviet strategic objectives. It was the conclusion of the report, that the NIE was mostly wrong to view Soviet strategic actions as primarily a response to its history of being invaded and that the NIE ignored or misinterpreted evidence that most Soviet strategic actions were offensive rather than defensive in nature. The report also rejected the NIE's conclusion that as the Soviet Union grew more powerful and capable its foreign policy would also become less aggressive.

==== Part Two ====
- A critique of the NIE interpretation of certain Soviet Strategic Developments

The second section of the report was primarily a criticism of the NIE's conclusions regarding Soviet strategic weapons programs, and how they are integrated into conventional Soviet forces and what impacts they have on Soviet strategic goals and plans. The report argued that the NIE underestimated the threat posed by Soviet strategic weapons programs, and that the development and deployment of several new weapons platforms and advancements in existing technologies would drastically alter the advantages that the United States and NATO had over the Warsaw Pact. The report cited these specific areas to reinforce its assessment:

- Soviet ICBM and SLBM Programs: The report cited the recent development of Soviet MIRV missile technology, coupled with a rapid modernization of ICBM and SLBM targeting capabilities to argue that the NIE was underestimating the impact of the sophistication, effectiveness and threat of numerical superiority that the Soviet strategic missile program was posing.
- Economic Factors: The NIE viewed Soviet military expenditures as being limited to economic activity in a similar manner as in the west. The report also took exception to this conclusion, arguing that, in retrospect, prior estimates of Soviet military budgets were far from accurate. They cited the 1970 NIE's estimate of the Soviet military budget as being only half of its actual value, and that this number was still being used as a baseline for current estimates. Using these numbers, the report concluded, greatly underestimated the resources available to the Soviet military and consequentially, underestimated potential capability, The report argued that the Soviets did not have the same financial constraints as the West, Guns vs. Butter, because as a dictatorship, the Soviet Union was less accountable for its budget.
- Civil Defense: Both the NIE and the Team B report noted that the level of sophistication, scope and expansion of nuclear civil defense was unmatched. And although the Soviet hardening of military and governmental facilities was covered by the NIE the report argued that this was a significant factor in their determination that the Soviets strategic planning was more focused on an offensive nuclear war rather than a defensive stance or deterrence.
- Mobile Missiles: The report also complained that the NIE did not adequately address the issues surrounding the planned Soviet deployment of the SS-X-16 mobile missile system. The SS-X-16, deployed as the SS-16 was the first mobile intercontinental ballistic missile deployed by the Soviet Union. Because it was built off the SS-20 platform (an intermediate range nuclear missile), it was argued that the SS-20 could be quickly and covertly converted into the longer range SS-16 in times of crisis, and would be a backdoor around the SALT I Treaty.
- Backfire Bomber: The recent deployment, and capabilities of the Tupolev Tu-22M, designated the "Backfire" by NATO, was also addressed. As with the mobile ICBMs, the NIE was said to have underestimated the current and potential performance of the Backfire, and as such, designated it as a short range bomber similar to the F-111, in capabilities. The report argued that the potential of the bomber, both in range and armaments, meant that it was more appropriate to classify the bomber as a long-range strategic platform, thereby impacting the total Soviet strategic nuclear threat.
- Anti Satellite Capability: The report argued that there was stronger evidence than presented by the NIE of a Soviet intent to develop Anti Satellite Capability and that despite the NIE judgment contrary, the Soviets were combining directed energy research to this end.
- Anti-Submarine Warfare: The report argued that despite the NIE's assessment in its 10-year forecast that the Soviet Navy was not aggressively developing more accurate ASW detection tools and would not be able to deploy new more advanced ASW capabilities in the next 10 years, the evidence in the NIE suggested that they had significantly ramped up ASW R&D, including non acoustic methods of detection. The report cautioned that to determine the real extent of Soviet ASW development would require significantly more research and access to classified materials, as the US Navy would not release its data to either Team B, or the CIA, they stressed that the probability of advanced Soviet ASW research was greater than zero, as the NIE implied it was.
- Anti-Ballistic Missiles: Although the Anti-Ballistic Missile Treaty of 1972 put a halt to further development and deployment of most ABM technology, there were exceptions for ABM systems surrounding Moscow and the Grand Forks Air Force Base in North Dakota. The report argued that since the NIE conceded that Soviet ABM research and development was continuing at a pace similar in size and scope it was before the ABM Treaty in 1972, it was likely that Soviet ABM technology was greater than the NIE concluded it was.

== Criticism ==
Team B concluded that the Soviet Union did not adhere to the doctrine of mutual assured destruction, but rather believed it could win a nuclear war outright. Pipes—in his Commentary article—argued that CIA suffered from "mirror-imaging" (i.e., from assuming that the other side had to—and did—think and evaluate exactly the same way); Pipes further wrote that Team B showed Soviet thinking to be based on winning a nuclear war (i.e., not avoiding such war due to MAD, because, he wrote, the Soviets were building MIRV'd nuclear missiles of high yield and high accuracy—appropriate for attacking hardened missile silos, but not needed for such large and vulnerable 'hostage' sites as cities). This was shocking to many at the time, but Pipes argues that later, after the collapse of the Soviet Union, it was proven to be true.

Fareed Zakaria notes, however, that the specific conclusions of the report

were wildly off the mark. Describing the Soviet Union, in 1976, as having 'a large and expanding Gross National Product,' it predicted that it would modernize and expand its military at an awesome pace. For example, it predicted that the Backfire bomber 'probably will be produced in substantial numbers, with perhaps 500 aircraft off the line by early 1984.' In fact, the Soviets had 235 in 1984.

According to Anne Hessing Cahn (Arms Control and Disarmament Agency, 1977–1980), Team B's analysis of weapons systems was later proven to be false. "I would say that all of it was fantasy. ... if you go through most of Team B's specific allegations about weapons systems, and you just examine them one by one, they were all wrong." The CIA director at the time, George H. W. Bush, concluded that the Team B approach set "in motion a process that lends itself to manipulation for purposes other than estimative accuracy." Brookings Institution Scholar Raymond Garthoff concurred, writing that in "retrospect, and with the Team B report and records now largely declassified, it is possible to see that virtually all of Team B's criticisms... proved to be wrong. On several important specific points it wrongly criticized and 'corrected' the official estimates, always in the direction of enlarging the impression of danger and threat." A top CIA analyst called Team B "a kangaroo court of outside critics all picked from one point of view."

Joshua Rovner, Associate Professor at the U.S. Naval War College, argues that the Team B exercise made sense in theory because scrutiny from outside of the intelligence bureaucracy can pressure analysts to be forthright regarding their assumptions and methodology. Providing Team B the opportunity to create an alternative assessment could have shed light on any institutional baggage, group-think, and inefficiency. "The competition turned ugly, however, when Team B turned its attention away from Moscow and leveled a blistering attack on the NIE process itself." It excoriated intelligence agencies for "persistent flaws" in past estimates and took it upon itself to "determine what methodological misperceptions cause their most serious errors of judgment." The intelligence community was furious, Rovner maintains, because they believed that the exercise was motivated by an ideological desire to frame the Soviet Union as more belligerent than the intelligence community was leading on. The NIE that emerged from the debacle was strongly influenced by Team B's contributions. Rovner believes that Team B was a case of indirect politicization. "The administration did not try to determine the membership of Team B nor the process of the exercise, but it gave de facto control over these pivotal issues to a group of outspoken critics of détente who argued publicly that the United States was seriously underestimating the Soviet threat."

Richard K. Betts, the Arnold Saltzman Professor of War and Peace Studies at Columbia University argues that the underlying problem was confusion about what level of analysis was at issue—an implicit blurring together of Soviet political objectives and military strategy.

At the level of what might be called strategic intent (how to approach war if it came), Soviet military doctrine was indeed clearly offensive and aimed at securing maximum advantage. Virtually no one challenged this point. Team B and Harvard University's Richard Pipes focused on this but did not distinguish the military strategic orientation clearly from political intent (objectives to be achieved), on which there were many more indications of Soviet commitment to avoiding nuclear war at nearly all costs. Team A and Raymond Garthoff of the Brookings Institution focused on this point. Pipes compared apples and oranges—American political intent with Soviet strategic intent, and American public rhetoric (emphasizing mutual assured destruction) with Soviet operational doctrine.

Paul Warnke, an official at the Arms Control and Disarmament Agency (ACDA) at the time of the Team B, wrote:

Whatever might be said for evaluation of strategic capabilities by a group of outside experts, the impracticality of achieving useful results by 'independent' analysis of strategic objectives should have been self-evident. Moreover, the futility of the Team B enterprise was assured by the selection of the panel's members. Rather than including a diversity of views ... the Strategic Objectives Panel was composed entirely of individuals who made careers of viewing the Soviet menace with alarm.

Richard Pipes has defended the project, and in 2003 said:

We dealt with one problem only: What is the Soviet strategy for nuclear weapons? Team B was appointed to look at the evidence and to see if we could conclude that the actual Soviet strategy is different from ours. It's now demonstrated totally, completely, that it was.

Also in 2003, Edward Jay Epstein offered that Team B had been a useful exercise in competitive analysis.

Derek Leebaert, professor of government at Georgetown University, supported Team B in his 2002 book The Fifty Year Wound: How America's Cold War Victory Shapes Our World. Although he agrees that "Team B's alternative National Intelligence Estimate contained its own mistakes", he claims that "Russian sources now show that the Team B analysts were fundamentally correct on all the key issues." He further says that when Team B and the CIA debated their reports in 1976, the CIA "conceded all essential points on Soviet nuclear war strategy to its harshest critics."

Jason Vest assessed the lasting implications of Team B:

Despite Kissinger's condemnation of Team B's assessment, Rumsfeld was effusive in promoting it as a credible study—and thereby undermining arms control efforts for the next four years. Two days before Jimmy Carter's inauguration, Rumsfeld fired parting shots at Kissinger and other disarmament advocates, saying that "no doubt exists about the capabilities of the Soviet armed forces" and that those capabilities "indicate a tendency toward war fighting ... rather than the more modish Western models of deterrence through mutual vulnerability." Team B's efforts not only were effective in undermining the incoming Carter administration's disarmament efforts but also laid the foundation for the unnecessary explosion of the defense budget in the Reagan years. And it was during those years that virtually all of Rumsfeld's compatriots were elevated to positions of power in the executive branch.

== See also ==
- Office of Special Plans
