= Glenn R. Simpson =

American journalist (born 1964)

- Born: 1964 or 1965 (age 61–62)
- Education: George Washington University (BA)
- Occupations: Journalist and author
- Known for: Co-founder, Fusion GPS
- Spouse: Mary Jacoby

Glenn Richard Simpson (born 1964) is an American former journalist who worked for The Wall Street Journal until 2009, and then co-founded the Washington-based research business Fusion GPS. He was also a senior fellow at the International Assessment and Strategy Center.

He is the co-author of Dirty Little Secrets: The Persistence of Corruption in American Politics written with political scientist Larry Sabato and published in 1996. A New York Times book review called the book's approach "fiercely bipartisan".

== Early life ==
Simpson graduated from Conestoga High School in 1982, then went to George Washington University, where his neck was broken in a car crash.

== Career ==
Before Simpson worked for The Wall Street Journal, he was a reporter for Roll Call, where he broke stories on GOPAC, a political action committee headed by House Speaker Newt Gingrich.

Simpson left journalism in part to earn more money. Explaining why he left journalism, he quipped: "We don't use the word 'sold out.' We use the word 'cashed in.'"

=== Trump opposition research ===
From September 2015 to May 2016, Simpson was retained by a conservative newspaper, the Washington Free Beacon, to collect information on many of the Republican presidential candidates, including Donald Trump.

In April 2016, the Democratic National Committee and the Hillary Clinton campaign's law firm, Perkins Coie, retained Simpson's company Fusion GPS. From April 2016 into early May, the Washington Free Beacon and the Clinton Campaign/DNC were independently both clients of Fusion GPS. In June 2016, Fusion GPS hired Christopher Steele, a former MI6 agent, to obtain information on Trump. Steele used his "old contacts and farmed out other research to native Russian speakers who made phone calls on his behalf". After November 2016, funding from the Democratic Party ceased, and Simpson reportedly spent his own money to fund further work on the dossier.

=== Congressional testimony ===
In 2017 during Congressional inquiries into Russian interference in the 2016 United States elections, Simpson testified before the House Intelligence Committee that Roger Stone, Steve Bannon, and Ted Malloch, a "significant figure" in the Brexit campaign, had ties to each other.

On August 22, 2017, Simpson was questioned for 10 hours by the Senate Judiciary Committee in a closed-door meeting. The Committee did not release a transcript of the hearing. Simpson reportedly did not reveal the identities of his clients. The transcript was unilaterally released by Senator Dianne Feinstein on January 9, 2018.

== Publications ==
External videos
- Booknotes interview with Simpson on Dirty Little Secrets, June 30, 1996, C-SPAN
- Interview with Simpson on Crime in Progress, December 11, 2019, C-SPAN

- Glenn Simpson and Larry Sabato, Dirty Little Secrets: The Persistence of Corruption in American Politics, 1996.
- Glenn Simpson and Peter Fritsch, Crime in Progress: Inside the Steele Dossier and the Fusion GPS Investigation of Donald Trump, 2019.
