= Committee for Peace and Security in the Gulf =

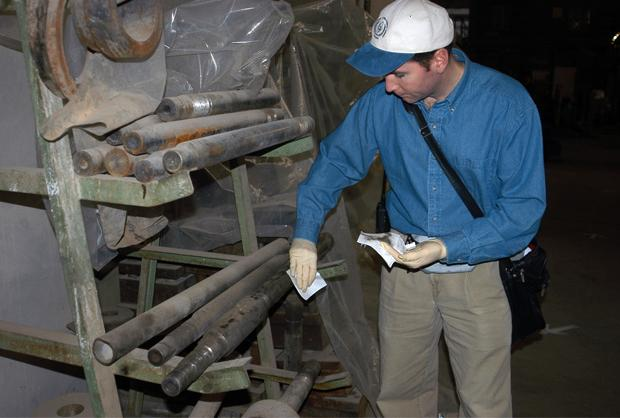
A UN weapons inspector in Iraq.

The Committee for Peace and Security in the Gulf (CPSG), formed in 1990 to support president George H. W. Bush’s campaign to drive Saddam Hussein out of Kuwait, was a bipartisan group whose members were active in U.S. foreign-policy circles. "The 39-member group…[included] former U.S. Rep. Stephen Solarz of New York, who was a member of the House Foreign Affairs Committee and Richard Perle, a former assistant defense secretary for international security policy."

Other members included Tony Coelho, Ann Lewis, Robert G. Torricelli, Richard G. Lugar, Howard H. Baker Jr., Frank C. Carlucci, and Jeane J. Kirkpatrick.

== Open Letter to President Clinton ==
At a Washington, DC news conference in February 1998, Solarz read a letter from the CPSG addressed to president Bill Clinton, urging more decisive action against Iraqi president Saddam Hussein. "Despite his defeat in the Gulf War, continuing sanctions, and the determined effort of UN inspectors to fetter out and destroy his weapons of mass destruction", read the open letter, "Saddam Hussein has been able to develop biological and chemical munitions". The letter continued, "the United States has tried to remove Saddam by encouraging coups and internal conspiracies. These attempts have all failed. Saddam is more wily, brutal and conspiratorial than any likely conspiracy the United States might mobilize against him. Saddam must be overpowered; he will not be brought down by a coup d'etat. But Saddam has an Achilles’ heel: lacking popular support, he rules by terror [and is] hated by his own people and the rank and file of his military. Iraq today is ripe for a broad-based insurrection. We must exploit this opportunity."

Detailing a plan of action, the letter urged Clinton to recognize a provisional government based on the Iraqi National Congress with a restored safe haven in northern Iraq — financed by release of frozen Iraqi assets "to the control of the provisional government to fund its insurrection". It further urged Clinton to "launch a systematic air campaign against the pillars of Saddam’s power — the Republican Guard divisions which prop him up and the military infrastructure that sustains him", and to "position U.S. ground force equipment in the region so that, as a last resort, we have the capacity to protect and assist the anti-Saddam forces in the northern and southern parts of Iraq".

In a report on the news conference and open letter, CNN correspondent John King asserted that "U.S. law and international opposition to such a plan would make it unlikely."

== See also ==
- Citizens for a Free Kuwait
- Committee for the Liberation of Iraq
- Committee on the Present Danger
- Institute for Religion and Democracy
- Project for the New American Century
