= Arthur Waldron =

American historian (born 1948)

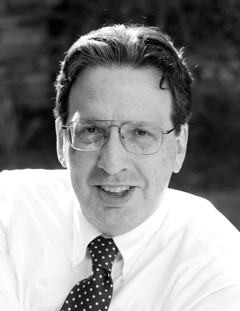
- Waldron in 2014
- Born: Arthur Nelson Waldron; 13 December 1948 (age 77); Boston, Massachusetts, U.S.
- Education: Harvard University (BA, PhD)
- Known for: The Great Wall of China: From History to Myth
- Spouse: Xiaowei Yu (1988-present)
- Scientific career
- Fields: Chinese history, comparative nationalism, integrative history, military history, international relations, Russian history
- Workplaces: University of Pennsylvania; Naval War College; Brown University; Princeton University
- Doctoral advisor: Philip A. Kuhn, Joseph F. Fletcher Jr.
- Other academic advisors: Yingshih Yü, Frederick Mote, Richard Pipes

Arthur Waldron (born December 13, 1948) is an American historian. Since 1997, Waldron has been the Lauder Professor of International Relations in the department of history at the University of Pennsylvania. He works chiefly on Asia, China in particular, often with a focus on the origins and development of nationalism, and the study of war and violence in general.

== Early life and education ==
Waldron was born in Boston, Massachusetts, on December 13, 1948. Waldron studied at the Taft School in Watertown, Connecticut, and Winchester College in England. He attended Harvard College from which he graduated summa cum laude in 1971, receiving the Sophia Freund Prize, given to the student ranked academically highest in his class. In 1981 he received a Ph.D. in history, also from Harvard.

== Career ==
Waldron is a founder and vice president of the International Assessment and Strategy Center in Washington, D.C. He is a former director of Asian studies with the American Enterprise Institute, a director of the American Association of Chinese Studies, a member of the board of the Jamestown Foundation, Washington, D.C., and a member of the Council on Foreign Relations. Prior to arriving at the University of Pennsylvania, Waldron taught at, the U.S. Naval War College, and Princeton University, and as adjunct professor of East Asian Studies at Brown University. In 2003–2004 he was visiting professor of history, at the Katholieke Universiteit Leuven, Belgium.

Waldron has lived and studied in China, Japan, Taiwan, France, England, and the former Soviet Union, where he earned a certificate in Russian language proficiency. He occasionally consults for the U.S. government, and was a founding member of the Congressional US-China Economic and Security Review Commission (2000-) as well as one of twelve outside experts on the top-secret Tilelli Commission (2000–2001) which evaluated the CIA's China operations. He has represented the United States in “track two” meetings with Korea, Taiwan, China, Japan and Russia.

== Research ==
Waldron studied Ming Dynasty (1368–1644) history at Harvard, during which he focused on why the relationship between the sedentary Ming and the nomadic Mongols who lived to the north often turned hostile. This led him to study the two debates over the recovery of the northwest loop of the Yellow River, known as the Ordos Loop. The debates are called in Chinese fu tao yi (復套議) and were the topic of his PhD dissertation. After additional research, mostly undertaken at Princeton, this thesis culminated in his first book, The Great Wall of China: From History to Myth, which drew upon extensive documentary research to show that although multiple walls had been built at various times, the Ming Wall had given rise to the idea of the "Great Wall"—which turned out to be a constantly evolving compound of fact and myth, as well in recent times as a potent patriotic symbol. According to Waldron's book, actual wall building was best understood as an aspect of larger frontier strategy, never a single grand project in itself.

Also while at Princeton Waldron began working on the history and diplomacy of the early Republican (pre-Nationalist) period in China. A major source was the papers of John Van Antwerp MacMurray, who served as U.S. minister to China in the 1920s until his 1929 resignation. In 1992, Waldron published MacMurray's memorandum of 1935, which foresaw the coming of conflict between the United States and Japan and was greatly esteemed by such later diplomats as George F. Kennan, with introduction and notes.

Parallel research on China during the same period—that of the "Warlords" or junfa (軍閥), a term often taken as indigenous but that Waldron has demonstrated is borrowed from Japanese Marxist writings —produced his third book, From War to Nationalism, in 1995. This presents a novel argument showing how the large-scale but almost entirely unstudied Second Zhili-Fengtian War of 1924 (his was the first book in any language, Chinese included, to analyze the conflict) so utterly disrupted the existing political and power structures of China as to create a vacuum, along with the conditions for the emergence, in the following year, of the radical nationalist May Thirtieth Movement. That war brought the demise of much that had been standard in Chinese politics and international relations, often since the nineteenth century, while opening the way for the mass, strongly leftist, and nationalist politics (the phrase "Chinese nationalism" dramatically enters the English vocabulary in 1925) that becomes increasingly strong thereafter, ultimately bringing Communist rule in 1949.

Building on his War College experience, Waldron has continued at the University of Pennsylvania to research and teach comparative warfare and strategic analysis, ranging the world and recorded history, while also, in keeping with Sinological training, offering seemingly more conventional courses on Asian and Chinese history and culture, often dealing with the complex webs of causes that produce nationalism and related phenomena. His most recent publications have dealt with issues of Chinese patriotism, national identity, and military tactics in the Second World War. Waldron's research interests include twentieth century Chinese history, China's policies toward and conflicts with her neighbors, and Asian international relations. He is currently working on a study of the attempts to create a constitutional order in the aftermath of the Qing Dynasty.

== Political views ==
Waldron is a frequent commentator and critic of the Chinese government and American foreign policy towards China. He has called American China policy since 1978 "[o]ur greatest foreign policy failure." In 2000, he "oppose[d] the grant of permanent normal trade relations for the People’s Republic of China." He recommends that "[r]ather than search pointlessly for understanding, win-win propositions, etc....it is time to hammer them in private on rights and military behavior." He co-signed an open letter to Donald Trump in support of the Trump Administration's China policy. He has compared China's foreign policy with that of Germany leading up to World War I, calling it a "Griff nach der Weltmacht, with Chinese characteristics." Waldron has claimed that in China "[t]he pollution might kill your infants; the hospitals are terrible, the food is adulterated, the system corrupt and unpredictable" and that the "disintegration of the People’s Republic of China is now under way.” During the COVID-19 pandemic, he suggested the possibility that the virus originated at the Wuhan Institute of Virology.

As a deterrent against China, in 2021 he proposed the nuclear armament of China's neighbors: "I believe just as Britain and France have a nuclear deterrent independent of the U.S., so should Japan, Australia and perhaps Taiwan and South Korea, which also face direct nuclear threats."

== Personal life ==
Waldron is married; he and his wife have two sons.

== Bibliography ==
- The Great Wall of China: from History to Myth (1989); ebook edition
- The Modernization of Inner Asia (Ed.)(1991)
- Zhong-Xi wenhua yu jiaohui daxue 中西文化與教會大學 [Chinese and Western Culture and Denominational Colleges in China] (Ed.) (1991)
- How the Peace Was Lost: The 1935 Memorandum “Developments Affecting American Policy in the Far East” (1992)
- From War to Nationalism: China’s Turning Point 1924-1925 (1995); 2003 pbk edition
- Zhongguo jiaohui daxue shi luncong 中國教會大學史論叢 [Essays on the History of Denominational Colleges in China](Ed.)(1995)
- The People in Arms: Military Myth and National Mobilization since the French Revolution (Ed.) (2003); 2006 pbk edition
- The Chinese (forthcoming)
