= Roberta Wohlstetter =

American academic (1912–2007)

Wohlstetter in 1985

Roberta Morgan Wohlstetter (August 22, 1912 – January 6, 2007) was an American historian of U.S. military intelligence. In 1962 she authored Pearl Harbor: Warning and Decision. The book was based on a several-year study of the Japanese attack on Pearl Harbor in December 1941 and is still considered the foundational study of military surprises. President Ronald Reagan awarded her the Presidential Medal of Freedom in 1985.

== Early life and education ==
Wohlstetter was born Roberta Mary Morgan, in 1912 in Duluth, Minnesota. Her mother Elsie Morgan, and her father Edmund Morris Morgan, a professor at Harvard Law School helped simplify the federal rules of civil procedure and update the U.S. code of military justice. Her brother, Edmund Morgan, was a Pulitzer Prize-winning historian.

Wohlstetter received her bachelor's degree from Vassar College, New York State in 1933. She earned two master's degrees from Columbia University in psychology in 1936 and from Radcliffe College in comparative literature in 1937.

== Career ==
Wohlstetter worked from 1948 to 1965 for the RAND Institute, an American research institute that advises governments in shaping public policy processes, She continued to serve as a consultant to the institute until 2002.

In 1963, Columbia University awarded her the Bancroft Prize in American History.

Wohlstetter taught at the University of Chicago, Barnard College and Howard University and lectured at many other colleges. She was a member of the Council on Foreign Relations, the International Institute for Strategic Studies, the Defense Science Council and the Advisory Council of the National Center for Intelligence Studies. She served as a consultant to the Assistant Secretary of Defense for International Security Affairs, and to the General Research Corporation in Santa Barbara, California. Wohlstetter was called to advise President John F. Kennedy during the Cuban Missile Crisis.

=== Pearl Harbor: Warning and Decision ===
President Ronald Reagan presents Albert and Roberta Wohlstetter and Paul Nitze with the Presidential Medal of Freedom. The East Room of the White House, Washington, D.C., 7 November 1985. Photograph by Peter J. Souza, courtesy of the Ronald Reagan Presidential Library.

As part of her work at the RAND Corporation, she carried out research that was published in 1962 in the book Pearl Harbor: Warning and Decision, a book that discusses the reasons for the US intelligence failures that led to the surprise attack on Pearl Harbor by the Japanese Empire in 1941.

The research for the book was based on the hearings held in the American Congress following the Japanese attack on Pearl Harbor and published in 1946. Her research was also based on the published memoirs of Japanese and American statesmen and military commanders. In addition, it was based on interviews of people who participated in the invasion from the US Navy and US Army.

President Ronald Reagan presents Wohlstetter with the Presidential Medal of Freedom. in the East Room of the White House, November 1985. (photograph courtesy of Ronald Reagan Presidential Library)

Her book Pearl Harbor: Warning and Decision attempts to explain the causes of the U.S. intelligence failures that led to Imperial Japan's 1941 surprise attack. In the years preceding the attack, U.S. code breakers were routinely reading much of the Japanese military and diplomatic traffic. However, a Japanese attack came as both a strategic and a tactical surprise. On the strategic level, U.S. intelligence analysts viewed the attack as unlikely because Japan could not expect to win the subsequent war (as it happens, Japanese planners had never completed a thorough strategic assessment. They were unwilling to abandon their expansion in east Asia and viewed the attack as the best way to start the inevitable confrontation). Furthermore, on several occasions during 1940-41 U.S. forces were put on high alert but no attack came, leading to fatigue. Finally, it was believed that the logical place for a Japanese attack would be in the Philippines. The book argues, in part, that intelligence failures are to be expected because of the difficulty identifying "signals" from the background "noise" of raw facts, regardless of the quantity of the latter.

On a tactical level, the attack came as a surprise because warning mechanisms - radar stations and patrol planes - were not deployed, although senior officers came to believe they were.

==== Influence of the book ====
The book has been praised for its high degree of scholarship. Military history writer Eugene Rasor wrote in 1998 that the book is "the best and most comprehensive study of the intelligence failure that led to the surprise attack".

The book was brought up again during discussions about the intelligence failures that led to the al-Qaeda attacks on the World Trade Center and the Pentagon on 9/11. Former Secretary of Defense Donald Rumsfeld, who was in office at the time of the September 11 attacks, was greatly influenced by the book and required his assistants to read it even before these events.

The book's findings and implications for modern intelligence analysts were updated in 2013 in another volume published by Stanford University Press, Constructing Cassandra, Reframing Intelligence Failure at the CIA, 1947-2001. That volume outlines how the hypotheses that Wohlstetter identifies as the mechanism by which intelligence "signals" are sorted from background "noise" are neither uniform, entirely rational or random, but are instead functions of the culture and identity of the analytic unit.

== Presidential Medal of Freedom ==
She and her husband were jointly awarded the Presidential Medal of Freedom by President Ronald Reagan in 1985. Reagan said:

Roberta Wohlstetter, a generation ahead of her time, asserted her influence in areas dominated by and, in some cases, reserved for men. She rose above all obstacles and has had a profound influence. Her inquiries went to the heart of the system of our society, focusing on essential questions. Her analysis of the problems of terrorism, intelligence, and warning and, with Albert [Wohlstetter], the problem of nuclear deterrence broke new ground and opened new alternatives for policymakers. I daresay that she has blankly enjoyed posing the same penetrating questions to her husband that she has to the intellectual and political leaders of the country. And that is certainly one explanation for the clarity and persuasiveness of his own voluminous words on strategy, politics, and world affairs.

== Personal life ==
In 1939, Wohlstetter married the mathematician and nuclear strategist Albert Wohlstetter. She had one daughter, Joan Wollstetter-Hall.

Wohlstetter died on January 6, 2007, at New York Hospital in New York City at age 94.

== Publications ==
- Pearl Harbor: Warning and Decision. Stanford, Calif.: Stanford University Press (1962). ISBN 0804705984, 978-1503620698. doi:10.1515/9781503620698.
- Cuba and Pearl Harbor: Hindsight and Foresight. Santa Monica, Calif.: RAND Corporation (Apr. 1965).
- International Terrorism: Kidnapping to Win Friends and Influence People (1974).

=== Collected works ===
- Zarate, Robert, and Henry D. Sokolski, eds. (Jan. 26, 2009). Nuclear Heuristics: Selected Writings of Albert and Roberta Wohlstetter. Carlisle Barracks, Penn.: Strategic Studies Institute. With commentary by Henry S. Rowen, Alain C. Enthoven, Richard Perle, Stephen J. Lukasik and Andrew W. Marshall.
