= The Treatment Trap =

The Treatment Trap: How the Overuse of Medical Care is Wrecking Your Health and What You Can Do to Prevent It
- Author: Rosemary Gibson and Janardan Prasad Singh
- Subject: Unnecessary health care
- Publisher: Ivan R. Dee, an imprint of Rowman & Littlefield
- Publication date: 2010
- Publication place: United States
- Pages: 237
- ISBN: 978-1-56663-842-5
- OCLC: 430192281

The Treatment Trap: How the Overuse of Medical Care is Wrecking Your Health and What You Can Do to Prevent It is a 2010 book by Rosemary Gibson and Janardan Prasad Singh.

== Reviews ==
A reviewer for Oncology Times said that the book was "beautifully written—clear and direct, filled with facts bookended by stories". AARP described the book as an exploration of "the reasons why many physicians are overly cautious, incompetent, or under great pressure to produce revenues in a health care system that seems to encourage these practices". A magazine review said that the message of the book was that "When it comes to health care, more is not always better."

== Books by the same author ==
Gibson co-authored the 2018 non-fiction, China Rx : exposing the risks of America's dependence on China for medicine with Janardan Prasad Singh
