= William Van Cleave =

American political scientist and advisor

William Robert Van Cleave (August 27, 1935 – March 15, 2013) was an American political scientist and an advisor to President Ronald Reagan, the United States Department of Defense, and Department of State as well as Emeritus Professor, former head, and the founder of Missouri State University's Department of Defense and Strategic Studies (DSS). The DSS program is now located in Arlington, Virginia, close to Washington D.C. He was also advisory council member of the Center for Security Policy, board advisor of the American Center for Democracy, and National Institute for Public Policy. As a strategic thinker, he is remembered as a leading Cold Warrior and long-standing hawkish policy advocate.

== Academic background and military service ==
Van Cleave received a B.A. in political science from the California State University, Long Beach as well as his M.A. and Ph.D. (1967) from the Claremont Graduate School (now Claremont Graduate University). His dissertation was titled "Nuclear Proliferation: The Interaction of Politics and Technology," and supervised by Harold W. Rood. He was Senior Research Fellow in National Security Affairs at the Hoover Institution on War, Revolution and Peace at Stanford University.

Van Cleave was Professor and Director of the Defense and Strategic Studies Program at the University of Southern California from 1967-87. Under his leadership, the DSS program started in 1971 in the School of International Relations at USC. The primary objective of the program was to provide graduate level education and training for students planning careers in national and international security affairs, policy-making, and teaching at the university-level. The program moved to Southwest Missouri State University (now MSU) in 1987 where DSS became a Department offering specialized Master of Science degree. In 2005, the University moved the Department physically to Fairfax, Virginia, to take advantage of the many opportunities that are available to the Washington metropolitan area.

=== Military service ===
Van Cleave enlisted in the United States Marine Corps at the age of 17, and became a Marine Security Guard at the American embassy in Vienna during the time of the Allied-occupied Austria following World War II. In 1957, he transferred to the Marine Reserves, and became an officer.

== Governmental and Professional Services ==
Van Cleave's past professional experience included being a member of the U.S. Delegation to the Strategic Arms Limitation Talks with the USSR, Chairman-Designate of General Advisory Committee on Arms Control and Disarmament Agency, Special Assistant for Strategic Policy and Planning in the Office of the Secretary of Defense, member of the Team B effort to review national intelligence on the USSR and to produce a competitive National Intelligence Estimate. From 1979 to 1981 he was Senior Advisor and Defense Policy Coordinator to Ronald Reagan and Director of the Department of Defense Transition Team between the administrations of President Carter and President Reagan. He was also a former officer at the U.S. Marine Corps.

He was the Director of the Division for Research in Strategy at the Institute for Advanced Strategic and Political Studies (IASPS) Trustee member of the International Institute of Strategic Studies, and Board Member of the Committee on the Present Danger.

Professor Van Cleave has approximately 200 professional publications, and has received numerous awards for his outstanding work as a teacher and faculty member. He was the 1979 Claremont Graduate University Distinguished Alumni Award Recipient.

Professor Van Cleave died on March 15, 2013 and is buried in Hemet, California.

== See also ==
- Center for Security Policy
- Committee on the Present Danger
- Institute for Advanced Strategic and Political Studies
- Arms Control and Disarmament Agency
- Strategic Arms Limitation Talks
- Claremont Graduate University
- Hoover Institution
