= Anne Hessing Cahn =

American political writer (died 2024)

Anne Hessing Cahn (c. 1930 – December 8, 2024) was a German-born American political author and arms control expert. She held a doctorate in political science from MIT and was notable for her criticism of the CIA among other U.S. agencies and leaders, particularly Team B and other aspects of the last days of the Cold War.

== Biography ==
Cahn was born c. 1930 in Mönchengladbach, Germany, the daughter of Ernest and Herta Hessing. She fled from Nazi Germany with her family, first to France, then to California. She met physicist John W. Cahn while they were attending the University of California, Berkeley, and they married in 1950.

Cahn was Scholar in Residence at The American University. She served the US Government as Chief of the Social Impact Staff at the Arms Control and Disarmament Agency (1977–81), Special Assistant to the Deputy Assistant Secretary of Defense (1980–81), and president and executive director of the Committee for National Security (1982–88). In 2001, she chaired the board of directors, for 20/20 Vision, a private organization founded to "increase citizen participation in public policy decisions on energy, security and the environment." She was also on the board of directors for the United States Institute of Peace or USIP, established in 1984, which is an independent, nonpartisan, national institution established and funded by the United States Congress.

John W. Cahn died in 2016. The couple had three children, Martin Cahn, a physician in Seattle; Andy Cahn, a science teacher in Kenmore, Washington; and Lorie Cahn, an environmental scientist in Jackson, Wyoming. Anne Hessing Cahn died in Seattle, Washington, on December 8, 2024.

== Selected works ==
- Cahn, Anne Hessing (1971). Eggheads and Warheads: Scientists and the ABM (Ph.D. thesis). Massachusetts Institute of Technology.
- Tsipsis, Kosta; Cahn, Anne H.; Feld, Bernard T., eds. (1973). The Future of the Sea-Based Deterrent. The MIT Press. ISBN 978-0-262-06049-3.
- Cahn, Anne Hessing (1974). Congress, Military Affairs, and (a Bit of) Information. SAGE Publications. ISBN 978-0-8039-0460-6.
- Cahn, Anne Hessing (April 1975). "Have Arms, Will Sell: Quantity is up and so is the quality". Bulletin of the Atomic Scientists. 31 (4): 10–12. doi:10.1080/00963402.1975.11458223.
- Cahn, Anne Hessing (1975). "Determinants of the Nuclear Option: The Case of Iran". In Marwah, Onkar S.; Schulz, Ann (eds.). Nuclear Proliferation and the Near-Nuclear Countries. Ballinger. pp. 185–204. ISBN 978-0-88410-605-0.
- Cahn, Anne H. (1975). Lasers: For War and Peace. Center for the Study of Armament and Disarmament, California State University.
- Cahn, Anne Hessing; Kruzel, Joseph J.; Dawkins, Peter M.; Huntzinger, Jacques (1977). Controlling Future Arms Trade. McGraw-Hill Book Company. ISBN 978-0-07-009589-2.
- Cahn, Anne Hessing (April 1993). "Team B: The Trillion Dollar Experiment". Bulletin of the Atomic Scientists. 49 (3): 22–31. doi:10.1080/00963402.1993.11456328.
- Cahn, Anne Hessing (1998). Killing Detente: The Right Attacks the CIA. The Pennsylvania State University Press. ISBN 978-0-585-23019-1.
