= Evelyn Dubrow =

American lobbyist (1911–2006)

Evelyn "Evy" Dubrow (March 6, 1911 – June 20, 2006) was an American labor lobbyist for the International Ladies Garment Workers' Union.

== Early life ==
Dubrow was born on March 6, 1911, in Passaic, New Jersey. Her father was Isadore DuBrow, a union member and carpenter, and her mother was Catherine Cahan, both of whom were Jewish immigrants who had moved from Belarus to the United States. She had four siblings: Mary, Fannie, Lillian and Jacob. Her eldest sister was a militant suffragist who was involved with the National Woman's Party and the passage of the 19th amendment, which impacted Dubrow's interest in activism.

During the Spanish Civil War, Dubrow began her labor activism by handing out fliers in New York's Union Square. She attended New York University, where she studied journalism. After graduation, she began working at the Paterson Morning Call, where she assisted a friend who was a reporter with the paper. While there, she joined her first union, the Newspaper Guild.

== Later life ==
She received the Presidential Medal of Freedom from President Bill Clinton in 1999. She died on June 20, 2006, of a heart attack at George Washington University Hospital in Washington, D.C. She was 95.

== See also ==
- Lobbying in the United States
