= Lee In-ho =

South Korean historian (born 1936)

Lee In-ho (Korean: 이인호; born 19 May 1936) is a South Korean historian specializing in Russian history and a professor emeritus of Seoul National University. She is a former South Korean ambassador to Finland and Russia, and South Korea's first female ambassador, appointed in 1996.

Lee was born and raised in Seoul, and studied at Seoul National University before moving to the United States in 1956. She received a B.A. in history from Wellesley College, an A.M. from Radcliffe College, and a PhD in history from Harvard University.
