= Albert Wohlstetter =

American political scientist

- Wohlstetter in 1985
- Born: December 19, 1913; New York, New York, U.S.
- Died: January 10, 1997 (aged 83); Los Angeles, U.S.
- Education: City College of New York; Columbia University
- Occupations: Military strategist; Systems theorist
- Known for: The Delicate Balance of Terror
- Spouse: Roberta Wohlstetter (née Morgan)
- Children: Joan Wohlstetter-Hall

Albert James Wohlstetter (December 19, 1913 – January 10, 1997) was an American political scientist noted for his influence on U.S. nuclear strategy during the Cold War. He and his wife Roberta Wohlstetter, an accomplished historian and intelligence expert, received the Presidential Medal of Freedom from Ronald Reagan on November 7, 1985.

== Early life and education ==
Albert Wohlstetter was born on 19 December 1913, the fourth and youngest child of Philip Wohlstetter and Nellie (née Friedman). His paternal grandparents were cosmopolitan Jews who immigrated to the United States from the Austro-Hungarian Empire in the latter half of the nineteenth century. Albert's father, Philip, was born in the United States about twenty years later. Albert's older siblings were William (1902–1967), Helene (1906–1974) and Charles (1910–1995). Albert's brother Charles was an accomplished businessman who would help Albert get his start as a young man. Charles also employed Helene at one of his companies, ConTel, where she was killed in a shooting by a disgruntled employee in 1974.

The Wohlstetters lived in the Washington Heights neighborhood of Manhattan. After attending the City College of New York, Philip Wohlstetter became an attorney and served as chief counsel to the Metropolitan Opera. In 1912, he founded one of the early phonograph companies, the Rex Talking Machine Corporation. Luminaries of the performance world were regular guests in the Wohlstetter home. The Rex company was taken over and its Wilmington, Delaware factory converted to war production during World War I. Philip died of a heart attack in 1918 when Albert was four years old.

=== City College of New York ===
Wohlstetter started at City College of New York in 1931 through a scholarship in modern dance, earning a B.A. in 1934. At the time he was involved in radical politics, and was a member of the League for a Revolutionary Workers Party, a Trotskyist splinter group, in the mid-1930s.

=== Columbia University ===
Wohlstetter started at Columbia Law School on a fellowship in 1934. It was in a class there that he met Roberta Morgan. Wohlstetter was bored by law school and left the program after only one year. He stayed at Columbia to pursue a Ph.D. in mathematical logic and the philosophy of science where he studied under Abraham Wald and was a peer of Jacob Wolfowitz. After a thesis titled Language and Empiricism earned him an M.A. in June 1937, several fellowships allowed him to work on his dissertation. He had a fellowship with the Social Science Research Council on a project to incorporate modern mathematical methods into economics and business cycle research. From 1941 to 1942 he was a research associate at the National Bureau of Economic Research.

In August 1942 the Wohlstetters vacationed with Dwight Macdonald, one of the editors of Partisan Review, and his wife, Nancy in Nantucket.

He left Columbia's graduate program to work for the U.S. government on war planning during World War II and never completed his doctorate.

== Early career ==
During the Second World War, Wohlstetter worked on problems of war production for the Planning Committee of the War Production Board. It is unclear how he ended up there. In an interview, Wohlstetter says that while on the Carnegie associateship with NBER, Simon Kuznets was hired by Robert R. Nathan and it was Kuznets who hired Wohlstetter. Albert's brother Charles recounts that it was Arthur F. Burns who gave Albert the job.

Later he worked at Atlas Aircraft Products Company.

After the war, Wohlstetter worked briefly in business in New York. He moved back to Washington, D.C. to serve as the Director of Programs for the National Housing Agency (USHA) in 1946 and 1947, the only time in his career he was a federal employee. At the USHA Wohlstetter worked with Paul Weidlinger, an engineer who had worked during the war for an aircraft company owned by Albert's brother, Charles, designing modular buildings such as airplane hangars that could be assembled quickly. At the USHA Wohlstetter and Weidlinger worked on applying such principles to domestic residential buildings.

During the 1937–1938 school year, Roberta had worked as a teaching assistant at the University of Southern California, during which time she became enamored with the California lifestyle. At her urging, and with his brother Charles helping to secure a job for Albert, the Wohlstetters moved to Santa Monica in 1947. Albert went to work for the General Panel Corporation to "tool up" their industrial plant. General Panel Corporation was a company founded by Walter Gropius and Konrad Wachsmann, two important figures in the Bauhaus movement.

== RAND Corporation ==
While on a walk, Albert and Roberta ran into Abe Girschick, Olaf Helmer and Chen McKinsey on the street in Santa Monica. Albert knew the three from his days as a student and in government service. The three mathematicians "... were overjoyed to see us. Mathematical logic was a very, very small world. There were only a little over a dozen mathematical logicians before the war in the United States ..." Girschick, Helmer and McKinsey were working at the recently formed RAND Corporation. With their help, Hans Speier, the head of the RAND social science division, hired Roberta, initially to write book abstracts for circulation to the RAND staff. When General Panel Corporation finally went out of business in 1951, Albert wanted to return to academia in the east, but Roberta was intent on remaining in California. She set up a meeting between Albert and Charles J. Hitch, the head of the RAND economics department. The two hit it off and Wohlstetter was brought on as a consultant to the Mathematics Department.

Wohlstetter remained a consultant with RAND for the first few years. It was not until June or July 1953, a few months after he began briefing Selection and Use of Strategic Air Bases to the Air Force that Hitch finally insisted that his consultant status was "absurd" and that he join the permanent staff.

At RAND, he researched how to posture and operate U.S. strategic nuclear forces to deter plausible forms of Soviet nuclear-armed aggression in way that was credible, cost-effective and controllable.

Wohlstetter's The Delicate Balance of Terror (1958) was highly influential in shaping the thinking of the Washington foreign policy establishment, particularly in its emphasis on the looming threat of Soviet attack.

During this period, Wohlstetter's relationship with fellow RAND strategist Bernard Brodie grew increasingly acrimonious. In 1963, Brodie accused Wohlstetter of a security violation and financial malfeasance. Wohlstetter had shared a draft RAND paper by Constantin Melnik with Henry Rowen, then one of the Whiz Kids working as the Deputy Assistant Secretary of Defense for International Security Affairs under Robert McNamara. Brodie also claimed that Wohlstetter was extravagant in wining and dining clients and colleagues using RAND funds. Wohlstetter defended himself by pointing out that the Melnik paper was only a "D" designated document, RAND's lowest level classification, and as a former RAND employee who had collaborated extensively with Wohlstetter on some of his most important studies, Rowen was authorized to receive the paper. Nevertheless, RAND Director Frank Collbohm demanded that Wohlstetter submit his resignation. When Wohlstetter refused, Collbohm fired him, but agreed to let Wohlstetter stay on at RAND long enough to find another job.

== University of Chicago ==
At the suggestion of Hans Morgenthau and with his help, Wohlstetter secured a position as a professor of political science at the University of Chicago.

In the 1960s and 1970s, he expanded the scope of his research to include alliance policy and nuclear nonproliferation, ballistic missile defense, innovation in military technology, peacetime military competitions, and military potential and economics of civil nuclear energy.

In the 1980s, Wohlstetter frequently criticized proponents of mutual assured destruction who supported targeting of nuclear weapons on civilians and cities instead over enemy combatants and military forces.

Wohlstetter and his wife, Roberta Wohlstetter, also counseled both Democratic and Republican administrations, including advisers to President John F. Kennedy during the Cuban Missile Crisis in 1962. They received the Presidential Medal of Freedom from Ronald Reagan on November 7, 1985.

During his long career, Wohlstetter also taught at UCLA and the University of California, Berkeley, in the early 1960s. From 1964 to 1980, he taught in the political science department of the University of Chicago, and chaired the dissertation committees of Paul Wolfowitz, Efraim Inbar and Zalmay Khalilzad. He is often credited with influencing a number of prominent members of the neoconservative movement, including Richard Perle (who, as a teenager, dated Wohlstetter's daughter Joan). He is the uncle of John Wohlstetter, author of Sleepwalking with the Bomb and The Long War Ahead and The Short War Upon Us.

The Commission on Integrated Long-Term Strategy meets with President Reagan to discuss their report, Discriminate Deterrence. Members of the commission on the left side of the table (clockwise from the bottom of the photograph to the top): Gen. Bernard Schriever, former Commander, Air Force Systems Command; Judge William P. Clark, former National Security Adviser; Ambassador Anne Armstrong, chairperson, President's Foreign Intelligence Advisory Board; Gen. John Vessey, former Chairman of Joint Chiefs of Staff; Albert Wohlstetter; Fred Iklé, former Under Secretary of Defense for Policy; Zbigniew Brzezinski, former National Security Adviser; Gen. Andrew J. Goodpaster, former NATO Supreme Allied Commander; W. Graham Claytor, Jr., former Secretary of the Navy and Deputy Secretary of Defense; Samuel P. Huntington, Director, Center for International Affairs, Harvard University; Admiral James L. Holloway III, former Chief of Naval Operations (Commission members not present: Henry A. Kissinger, former National Security Adviser and Secretary of State; Joshua Lederberg, Professor of molecular genetics and informatics and President of Rockefeller University). The President and staff, right side of table, (top to bottom): National Security Adviser Colin Powell; President Ronald Reagan; Secretary of Defense Frank Carlucci (obstructed); Chief of Staff Howard Baker. White House Cabinet Room, Washington, D.C., 12 January 1988. Photograph by William Fitz-Patrick, courtesy of the Ronald Reagan Presidential Library. The Commission held a press briefing later that day at the Pentagon which is available via C-SPAN.

== Death ==
On 16 December 1996, his 83rd birthday, Wohlstetter was not feeling well. He and Roberta thought he was just ill or having an asthma attack. Over the telephone from New York their daughter Joan reviewed the symptoms for a heart attack and told Roberta to call an ambulance. Albert made a fuss, not wanting to go to the emergency room. At the hospital he was diagnosed as having had a serious heart attack and was discharged home with around-the-clock nursing care. In the living room he set up a makeshift chair that allowed him to partially recline so he could continue to work. A month later, on 10 January 1997, Wohlstetter died at his Laurel Canyon home.

A memorial was held at the office of the RAND Corporation and a month later Senator Jon Kyl and special guest Richard Perle conducted a brief remembrance in the Senate chamber. Albert Wohlstetter is buried at Westwood Village Memorial Park Cemetery in Los Angeles. Roberta Wolstetter died on 6 January 2007.

== Awards ==
President Ronald Reagan presents Albert and Roberta Wohlstetter and Paul Nitze with the Presidential Medal of Freedom. The East Room of the White House, Washington, D.C., 7 November 1985. Photograph by Peter J. Souza, courtesy of the Ronald Reagan Presidential Library.

He was twice awarded the Department of Defense Medal for Distinguished Public Service, first by Robert McNamara in February 1965 and again by Donald Rumsfeld in November 1976. He is the first recipient not employed by the Department of Defense and the first person awarded it twice.

On 7 November 1985 President Reagan awarded Albert Wohlstetter, along with his wife Roberta Wohlstetter and Paul Nitze, the Presidential Medal of Freedom.

== Legacy ==
The Albert J. and Roberta Wohlstetter Papers are available at the Hoover Institution Archives at Stanford University.

== In popular culture ==
Wohlstetter served as one of the inspirations for Stanley Kubrick's film, Dr. Strangelove or: How I Learned to Stop Worrying and Love the Bomb. In 1962, Kubrick was looking for his next project after Lolita and started reading intensively on nuclear issues. One of Kubrick's early ideas was to make a realistic thriller, titled after Wohlstetter's "Delicate Balance of Terror". But Kubrick could not conceive of a realistic scenario for an accidental nuclear war, so turned instead to the idea of making a comedy. The character of Dr. Strangelove is a composite of numerous people associated with RAND that besides Wohlstetter included Herman Kahn, John von Neumann, Wernher von Braun, and Edward Teller.

== Bibliography ==
=== Works by Wohlstetter ===
For a more complete list of the works of Albert Wohlstetter, see the Albert Wohlstetter Bibliography at the Nonproliferation Policy Education Center's AlbertWohlstetter.com website.

Government and research institute reports

- Wohlstetter, Albert J.; Hoffman, Fred S.; Lutz, R. J.; Rowen, Henry S. (April 1954). R-266: Selection and Use of Strategic Air Bases (Report). Santa Monica, Calif.: The RAND Corporation.
- Wohlstetter, Albert J.; Hoffman, Fred S.; Rowen, Henry S. (1 September 1956). R-290: Protecting U.S. Power to Strike Back in the 1950s and 1960s (PDF) (Report). Santa Monica, Calif.: The RAND Corporation.
- Wohlstetter, Albert (6 November 1958). P-1472: The Delicate Balance of Terror (Report) (Revised December 1958 ed.). Santa Monica, Calif.: RAND.
- Wohlstetter, Albert; Rowen, Henry (1 May 1959). RM-2373: Objectives of the United States Military Posture (PDF) (Report). Santa Monica, Calif.: The RAND Corporation.
- Dean, Acheson (March 1961). A Review of North Atlantic Problems for the Future (Report). Papers of John F. Kennedy. Presidential Papers. National Security Files. Meetings and Memoranda. John F. Kennedy Presidential Library and Museum. JFKNSF-329-015.
- Wohlstetter, Albert; Coleman, Sinclair (October 1970). Race Differences in Income: A Report Prepared for the Office of Economic Opportunity (R-578-OEO) (PDF) (Report). Santa Monica, Calif.: The Rand Corporation.
- Wohlstetter, Albert; Brown, Thomas; Jones, Gregory; McGarvey, David; Raab, Robert; Steiner, Arthur; Wohlstetter, Roberta; Wurtele, Zivia (14 January 1975). The Strategic Competition: Perceptions and Response; Final Report for the Director of Defense Research and Engineering (Net Technical Assessment) (Report). Los Angeles, Calif.: PAN Heuristics. DAHC 15-73-C-0137.
- Paolucci, D.A. (7 February 1975). Summary Report of the Long Range Research and Development Planning Program (Report). Defense Advanced Research Projects Agency and Defense Nuclear Agency. DNA-75-03055.
- Commission on Integrated Long-Term Strategy (January 1988). Discriminate Deterrence: Report of the Commission on Integrated Long-Term Strategy (Report). Washington, D.C.: United States Government Printing Office. OCLC 614499698.

Essays

- Wohlstetter, Albert (April 1936). "The Structure of the Proposition and the Fact". Philosophy of Science. 3 (2): 167–184. doi:10.1086/286411. JSTOR 184344. S2CID 119746272.
- Wohlstetter, Albert; White, Morton Gabriel (Fall 1939). "Who Are the Friends of Semantics?". Partisan Review. 6 (5): 50–57.
- Wohlstetter, Albert (January 1959). "The Delicate Balance of Terror". Foreign Affairs. 37 (2): 211–234. doi:10.2307/20029345. JSTOR 20029345.
- Wohlstetter, Albert (April 1961). "Nuclear Sharing: NATO and the N+1 Country". Foreign Affairs. 39 (3): 355–387. doi:10.2307/20029495. JSTOR 20029495.
- Wohlstetter, Albert (April 1963). "Scientists, Seers and Strategy". Foreign Affairs. 41 (3): 466–478. doi:10.2307/20029633. JSTOR 20029633.
- Wohlstetter, Albert (1964). "Analysis and Design of Conflict Systems". In Quade, Edward S. (ed.). Analysis for Military Decisions. Chicago, Ill.: Rand McNally & Co. pp. 103–148. OCLC 299738722.
- Wohlstetter, Albert (1964). "Strategy and the Natural Scientists". In Gilpin, Robert; Wright, Christopher (eds.). Scientists and National Policy-Making. Columbia University Press. pp. 174–239. OCLC 769999212.
- Wohlstetter, Albert; Wohlstetter, Roberta (April 1965), Controlling the Risks in Cuba, Adelphi Papers, vol. 5, London: Institute for Strategic Studies, pp. 3–24, doi:10.1080/05679326508457156
- Wohlstetter, Albert (January 1968). "Illusions of Distance". Foreign Affairs. 46 (2): 242–255. doi:10.2307/20039298. JSTOR 20039298.
- Wohlstetter, Albert (September 1968). "Theory and Opposed-Systems Design". The Journal of Conflict Resolution. 12 (3): 302–331. doi:10.1177/002200276801200303. S2CID 143992487.
- Wohlstetter, Albert (Summer 1974). "Is There a Strategic Arms Race?". Foreign Policy (15): 3–20. doi:10.2307/1147927. JSTOR 1147927.
- Wohlstetter, Albert (Autumn 1974). "Is There a Strategic Arms Race? (II): Rivals but No "Race"". Foreign Policy (16): 48–92. doi:10.2307/1147844. JSTOR 1147844.
- Wohlstetter, Albert (24 September 1974). "Clocking the Strategic Arms Race". The Wall Street Journal. New York.
- Wohlstetter, Albert (Fall 1974). "Legends of the Strategic Arms Race, Part I: The Driving Engine". Strategic Review. 2 (1): 67–92.
- Wohlstetter, Albert (Autumn 1975). "Optimal Ways to Confuse Ourselves". Foreign Policy (20): 170–198. doi:10.2307/1148133. JSTOR 1148133.
- Wohlstetter, Albert (Winter 1975). "Legends of the Strategic Arms Race, Part II: The Uncontrolled Upward Spiral". Strategic Review. 3 (1): 71–86.
- Wohlstetter, Albert (Summer–Autumn 1976). "Racing Forward? Or Ambling Back?". Survey. 22 (3/4): 163–217.
- Wohlstetter, Albert (June 1983). "Bishops, Statesmen, and Other Strategists on the Bombing of Innocents". Commentary. 75 (6): 15–35.
- Wohlstetter, Albert (Summer 1985). "Between an Unfree World and None: Increasing Our Choices". Foreign Affairs. 63 (5): 962–994. doi:10.2307/20042364. JSTOR 20042364.
- Wohlstetter, Albert (1987). "Political and Military Aims of Offensive and Defensive Innovation". In Hoffman, Fred S.; Wohlstetter, Albert; Yost, David S. (eds.). Swords and Shields: NATO, The USSR, and New Choices for Long-Range Offense and Defense. Lexington, Mass.: Lexington Books. pp. 3–36. ISBN 0-669-14249-2.
- Brzezinski, Zbigniew; Kissinger, Henry; Iklé, Fred; Wohlstetter, Albert (24 February 1988). "Discriminate Deterrence Would Not Leave Europe Dangling". International Herald Tribune.
- Wohlstetter, Albert (Fall–Winter 1988). "Overseas Reactions to Discriminate Deterrence". Atlantic Community Quarterly. 26 (3): 234–269.
- Wohlstetter, Albert; Prowse, Stephen (1988), "Stability in a World with More than Two Countries", Beyond START?, La Jolla, Calif.: University of California Institute on Global Conflict and Cooperation (IGCC), pp. 46–54

Interviews

- Wohlstetter, Albert (July 5, 1985). "The Development of Strategic Thinking at RAND, 1948–1963: A Mathematical Logician's View — an Interview with Albert Wohlstetter" (Interview). Interviewed by James Digby and Joan Goldhammer. transcribed by Dana Bursk. Santa Monica, Calif.: RAND Corporation (published 1997).
- Wohlstetter, Albert (30 January 1986). "Oral History Interview with Professor Albert Wohlstetter" (PDF) (Interview). Interviewed by Maurice Matloff. Washington, D.C.: Office of the Secretary of Defense, Historical Office.
- Wohlstetter, Albert (29 July 1987). "RAND History Project Interviews: Albert Wohlstetter" (Interview). Interviewed by Martin Collins and Joseph Tatarewicz. Washington, D.C.: Archives Division, National Air and Space Museum, Smithsonian Institution. Acc. 1999-0037. Archived from the original on 2017-04-27.

Collected works

- Zarate, Robert; Sokolski, Henry, eds. (2009). Nuclear Heuristics: Selected Writings of Albert and Roberta Wohlstetter (PDF). With commentaries by Henry S. Rowen, Alain C. Enthoven, Richard Perle, Stephen J. Lukasik and Andrew W. Marshall. Carlisle, Pa.: Strategic Studies Institute. ISBN 978-1-58487-370-9.

=== Additional Sources ===
- Abella, Alex (2008). Soldiers of Reason: The RAND Corporation and the Rise of the American Empire. Orlando, Fla.: Harcourt. ISBN 978-0-15-101081-3.
- Basrur, Rajesh (15 April 2014), Nuclear Deterrence: The Wohlstetter-Blackett Debate Re-visited, Singapore: S. Rajaratnam School of International Studies
- Beecher, William (1 October 1971). "Report on Safeguard ABM Testimony Finds Unprofessional and Misleading Comments on Both Sides". The New York Times. New York, N.Y.
- Braseth, Timothy (Summer 2011). "Josef Van der Kar: Building Architectural Bridges" (PDF). Modernism. pp. 44–53.
- Cahn, Anne Hessing (1998). Killing Detente: The Right Attacks the CIA. University Park, Pa.: Pennsylvania State University Press. ISBN 0-271-01790-2.
- Cushman, John H. Jr. (17 December 1986). "Applying Military Brain to Military Brawn, Again". New York Times. New York.
- Davis, Lynn Etheridge; Schilling, Warner R. (June 1973). "All You Ever Wanted To Know About MIRV and ICBM Calculations But Were Not Cleared To Ask". Journal of Conflict Resolution. 12 (2): 207–242. doi:10.1177/002200277301700203. S2CID 146307933.
- Heeger, Susan (8 July 2001). "Through The Looking Glass; The transparent walls of a photographer's retreat blur the lines between a classic modern structure and its tranquil and timeless garden". Los Angeles Times Magazine. Photographs by Dominique Vorillon. Los Angeles, Calif.
- Herken, Gregg (1985). Counsels of War. New York: Alfred A. Knopf. ISBN 0-394-52735-6.
- Kaplan, Fred (1983). The Wizards of Armageddon. New York: Simon and Schuster. ISBN 0-671-42444-0.
- Kennedy, Paul (12 May 1988). "Not So Grand Strategy". New York Review of Books. 35 (8): 5–8.
- Kubbig, Bernd W. (June 1999). Experts on Trial: The Wohlstetter / Rathjens Controversy, the Making of the ABM Treaty, and Lessons for the Current Debate about Missile Defense (Report). translated by Gerard Holden. Frankfurt am Main: Peace Research Institute Frankfurt. OCLC 264157548.
- Kyl, Jon; Perle, Richard (6 February 1997). "Remembering Albert Wohlstetter" (PDF). Congressional Record—Senate. Vol. 143, no. 14 (105th Congress, 1st Session ed.). Washington, D.C.: Government Printing Office. pp. S1112–S1113.
- Lee, Pamela M. (Fall 2011). "Aesthetic Strategist: Albert Wohlstetter, the Cold War, and a Theory of Mid-Century Modernism". October. 138: 15–36. doi:10.1162/OCTO_a_00064. JSTOR 41417904. S2CID 57561035.
- Marshall, Andrew W.; Martin, James John; Rowen, Henry S., eds. (1991). On Not Confusing Ourselves: Essays on National Security Strategy in Honor of Albert and Roberta Wohlstetter. Boulder, Colo.: Westview Press. ISBN 0-813-31195-0. OCLC 494218492.
- Menand, Louis (27 June 2005). "Fat Man: Herman Kahn and the Nuclear Age". The New Yorker. New York: Condé Nast.
- Mukherjee, Aparna; Jacobs, David; Porfirenko, Natalia; Bulatoff, Ronald (2001), A Register of the Albert J. and Roberta Wohlstetter Papers (Revised 2007 ed.), Stanford, Calif.: Hoover Institution Archives, Stanford University
- Pace, Eric (14 January 1997). "Albert Wohlstetter, 83, Expert On U.S. Nuclear Strategy, Dies". New York Times.
- Podvig, Pavel (Summer 2008). "The Window of Vulnerability That Wasn't: Soviet Military Buildup in the 1970s — A Research Note". International Security. 33 (1): 118–138. doi:10.1162/isec.2008.33.1.118. JSTOR 40207103. S2CID 57568873.
- Prowse, Stephen D.; Bertram, Christoph; Lellouche, Pierre; Martin, Laurence (Summer 1988). "The Iklé-Wohlstetter Report". The National Interest (12): 11–22. JSTOR 42894563.
- Richardson, Robert L. Jr. (2009). Neoconservatism: Origins and Evolution, 1945–1980 (Ph.D.). Department of History, University of North Carolina. OCLC 950539179.
- Robin, Ron (2016). The Cold World They Made: The Strategic Legacy of Roberta and Albert Wohlstetter. Cambridge, Mass.: Harvard University Press. ISBN 978-0-674-04657-3.
- Rosecrance, Richard (1991). "Albert Wohlstetter". In Baylis, John; Garnett, John (eds.). Makers of Nuclear Strategy. St. Martin's Press. pp. 57–69. ISBN 0-312-07555-3.
- Security Resources Panel of the Science Advisory Committee (7 November 1957). Deterrence and Survival in the Nuclear Age (PDF) (Report). Washington, D.C.: Executive Office of the President, Office of Defense Mobilization.
- Swidey, Neil (18 May 2003). "The Analyst". The Boston Globe. Boston, Mass.
- Wilson, George C. (10 January 1988). "Precise Non-Nuclear Arms Urged". The Washington Post. Washington, D.C.
- Wohlstetter, Charles (1997). The Right Time, The Right Place. New York: Applause Books. ISBN 1-55783-310-9.
- Zarate, Robert (2009). "Introduction: Albert and Roberta Wohlstetter on Nuclear-Age Strategy". In Zarate, Robert; Sokolski, Henry (eds.). Nuclear Heuristics: Selected Writings of Albert and Roberta Wohlstetter (PDF). Carlisle, Pa.: Strategic Studies Institute. pp. 1–90. ISBN 978-1-58487-370-9.
