= Charles Tyroler II =

American political strategist

Charles Tyroler II (January 2, 1915 – March 13, 1995) was a member of the President's Intelligence Oversight Board during the Reagan and first Bush administrations and a longtime United States Democratic Party strategist.

He managed the 1956 vice-presidential campaign of Senator Estes Kefauver, Democrat from Tennessee. He then served as the director of the Democratic Advisory Council from 1957 to 1960. He was also active in the presidential campaigns of John F. Kennedy (1960), Lyndon B. Johnson (1964), and Hubert H. Humphrey (1968).

He owned one of the very early 1952 Nash Healey convertibles (factory equipped with a McCulloch supercharger), that he subsequently replaced with a Chevy 348 engine that he bought directly from the factory in 1957. The car was a white convertible with a maroonish interior.
