= Farmer's Delight =

Historic house in Virginia, United States

- U.S. National Register of Historic Places
- Virginia Landmarks Register
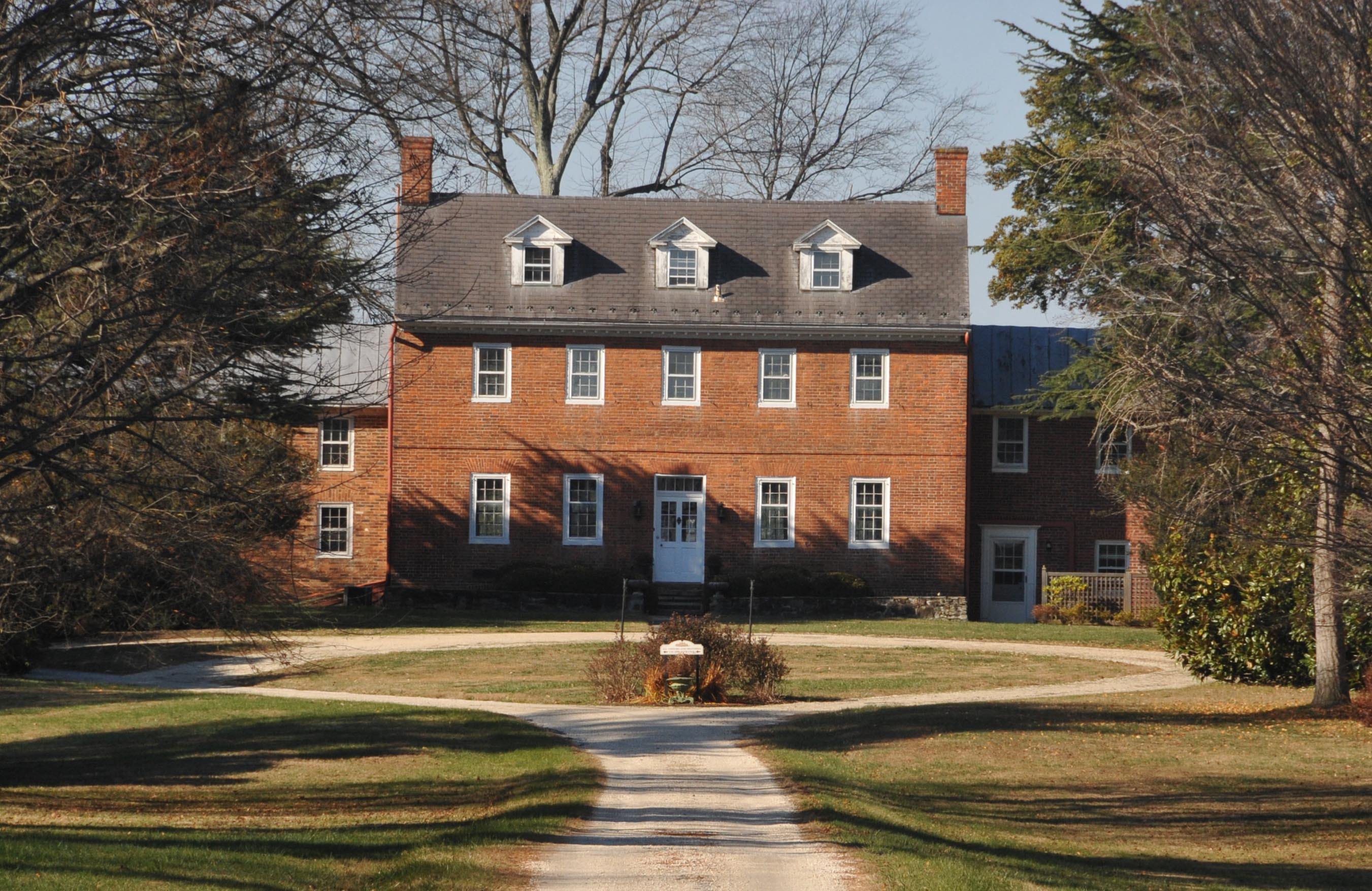

- Location within Northern Virginia Location within Virginia Location within the United States
- Location: About 3 miles (4.8 km) north of Middleburg off Rte. 745 Leithtown, Virginia
- Coordinates: 39°1′10.84″N 77°45′22.33″W
- Area: 320 acres (130 ha)
- Built: 1791
- Architectural style: Federal
- NRHP reference No.: 73002033
- VLR No.: 053-0121

Significant dates
- Added to NRHP: June 2, 1973
- Designated VLR: April 17, 1973; June 18, 2009

Farmer's Delight was built in Loudoun County, Virginia in 1791 by Colonel Joseph Flavius Lane. The Federal style brick plantation house incorporates elements of Georgian architecture. The house is now closely associated with American oilman and diplomat George C. McGhee, who owned the property after 1948. The house is maintained by the McGhee Foundation and is listed on the National Register of Historic Places.

== History ==
Lane, a member of the Virginia General Assembly in 1792–1793, was a colonel in the U.S. Army during the Whiskey Rebellion, and had been a member of the Continental Army during the American Revolution. Lane and his wife Katharine had eight children. The family operated their property as a plantation, using slave labor, and named it "Farmer's Delight." Although Lane died in 1803, the plantation stayed in the Lane family until 1856, when it was sold to the Leith family. At this time it was known as the Gregg Farm, after Lane descendant Emily Craig Gregg, who had inherited the property. The Leiths held the property until 1919, lending their name to the nearby community of Leithtown, when the property was sold to Henry W. Frost, Jr., who renamed the farm "Frostfields," expanded the house and operated racing and hunting stables. In 1948 the house was bought by diplomat George C. McGhee, who restored its original name and renovated the house, adding wings and gardens. McGhee obtained a set of stone columns for a trellised grape arbor from a Benedictine abbey at Samaron in France that were originally brought to the United States by William Randolph Hearst to be used at the Hearst Castle in San Simeon, California. The house was the scene of receptions for foreign dignitaries and American politicians, including President Lyndon B. Johnson.

== Description ==
The original house is about 23 feet (7.0 m) by 43 feet (13 m) in two stories with five bays, with two-story additions to the north of three bays and two bays to the south. Another large wing extends to the southwest, with an additional wing to the west beyond. The original brickwork and north wing are in Flemish bond, while other wings are American bond. The original plan is a center hall with a room to each side, with a steep, narrow stairway in the center hall. The house is claimed to closely resemble the George Wythe House in Williamsburg, Virginia. It is one of the earliest examples of brick construction in Loudoun County.

The property includes fifteen buildings on about 90 acres (36 ha). Gardens cover 20 acres (8.1 ha). The McGhee Library is housed in a structure reputed to be the oldest on the property, built about 1750. The bank barn-like structure was first used as a children's playroom, then converted to a library. A garage, built by the McGhees, houses an archive and research facility. Other structures include seven barns and agricultural buildings, two of which have been made into museums for McGhee's collections of artifacts from Africa, South America, the Middle East, southern Asia and the Pacific. A tenant house, built between 1880 and 1920, remains a residence for the farm supervisor. A small log cabin was relocated from its original location near The Plains. A small stone chapel is a replica of a chapel that the McGhees had admired in Bonn while McGhee was ambassador to West Germany.

McGhee altered the grounds extensively to resemble an informal English garden, primarily using conifers, with 162 trees of 122 species. Four terraces were designed for the garden by Washington landscape architect Boris Timochenko, of which three were built. The garden includes a boxwood maze. The front of the property is landscaped as an open, informal English park.

Farmer's Delight was listed on the National Register of Historic Places on June 2, 1973. The property is administered by the McGhee Foundation and is used for private and public events.
