= Walt Rostow =

American economist, political theorist and government official (1916–2003)

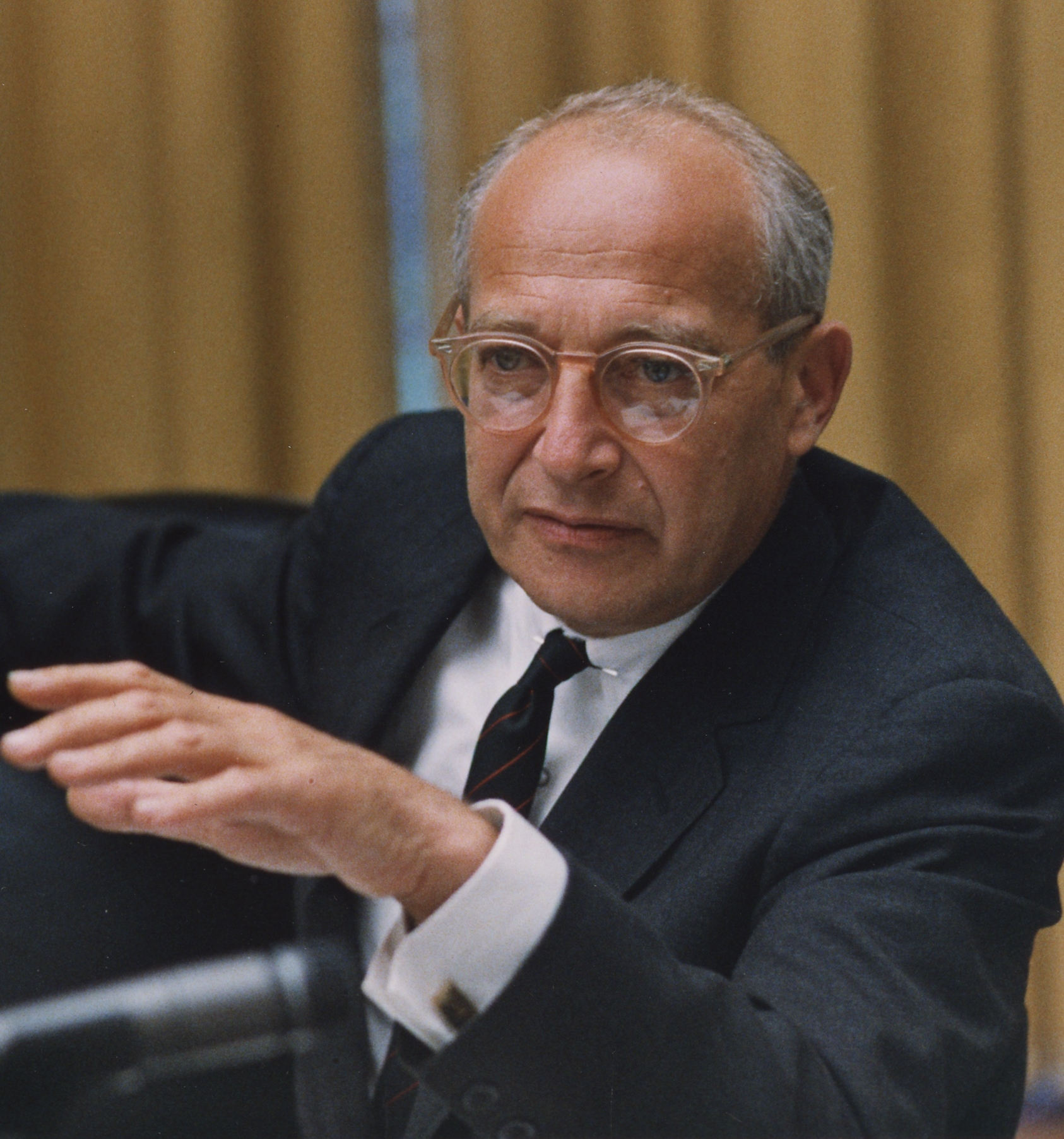
- Rostow in 1968

6th United States National Security Advisor
- In office April 1, 1966 – January 20, 1969
- President: Lyndon B. Johnson
- Deputy: Francis Bator
- Preceded by: Mac Bundy
- Succeeded by: Henry Kissinger

14th Counselor of the United States Department of State
- In office December 4, 1961 – March 31, 1966
- President: John F. Kennedy; Lyndon Johnson
- Preceded by: George McGhee
- Succeeded by: Robert Bowie

6th Director of Policy Planning
- In office December 4, 1961 – March 31, 1966
- President: John F. Kennedy; Lyndon Johnson
- Preceded by: George McGhee
- Succeeded by: Henry Owen

1st Deputy National Security Advisor
- In office January 20, 1961 – December 4, 1961
- President: John F. Kennedy
- Preceded by: Position established
- Succeeded by: Carl Kaysen

Personal details
- Born: Walt Whitman Rostow; October 7, 1916 New York City, U.S.
- Died: February 13, 2003 (aged 86) Austin, Texas, U.S.
- Party: Democratic
- Spouse: Elspeth Davies
- Children: 2
- Education: Yale University (BA, MA, PhD); Balliol College, Oxford (BLitt)

Walt Whitman Rostow OBE (rahs-TOU; October 7, 1916 – February 13, 2003) was an American economist, professor and political theorist who served as national security advisor to president of the United States Lyndon B. Johnson from 1966 to 1969.

Rostow worked in the Office of Strategic Services during World War II and later was a foreign policy adviser and speechwriter for presidential candidate and then President John F. Kennedy; he is often credited with writing Kennedy's famous "New Frontier" speech. Prominent for his role in shaping US foreign policy in Southeast Asia during the 1960s, he was a staunch anti-communist, noted for a belief in the efficacy of capitalism and free enterprise, and strongly supported US involvement in the Vietnam War.

Rostow is known for his book The Stages of Economic Growth: A Non-Communist Manifesto (1960), which was used in several fields of social science. Rostow's theories were embraced by many officials in both the Kennedy and Johnson administrations as a possible counter to the increasing popularity of communism in Asia, Africa and Latin America.

== Early life ==
Rostow was born in Manhattan, New York City, to a Russian Jewish immigrant family. His parents, Lillian (Helman) and Victor Rostow, were active socialists, and named Walt after the poet Walt Whitman. His elder brother Eugene also held a number of high government foreign policy posts.

Rostow's father, Victor Rostowsky, was born in the town of Orekhov near Odessa in 1886, and was involved in the Russian socialist movement as a teenager, publishing a left-wing newspaper in the basement of his parents' house calling for the overthrow of the Emperor Nicholas II. In 1904, at the age of 18, Victor Rostowsky boarded a ship that took him from Odessa to Glasgow and another ship that took him to New York. Upon arriving in the United States, Rostowsky "Americanized" his surname to Rostow. On 22 October 1912, he married Lillian Helman, the intellectually gifted daughter of Russian Jewish immigrants who longed to go to college, but as her family was too poor to afford higher education, she instead encouraged her sons to attain the higher education she wanted for herself. Like the Rostowskys, the Helmans were Ashkenazim (Yiddish-speaking Jews). The Rostows were described as being very "idealistic" immigrants who deeply loved their adopted country and named their three sons after the three men they considered to be the greatest Americans, namely Eugene V. Debs, Walt Whitman and Ralph Waldo Emerson.

Unlike many other Ashkenazi Jewish immigrants, Victor Rostow always spoke to his children in English rather than Yiddish as he felt this would improve their chances in life. Rostow's brother Eugene, who was named for Socialist Party of America leader Eugene V. Debs, became a legal scholar, and his brother Ralph, a department store manager. The American journalist Stanley Karnow described Rostow as extremely intelligent with a "brilliant" academic record that saw him graduate from high school at the age of 15. Rostow described his childhood as mostly happy with the only dark spots being that sometimes his classmates called him and his brothers "dirty Jews".

Rostow's parents closely followed events in Russia and Rostow later recalled a defining moment of his life, which occurred when, as a teenager, his parents invited for dinner a group of fellow Jewish socialists, together with a man who was serving as a purchasing agent for the Russian Soviet Federative Socialist Republic. After the dinner, Rostow remembered that his father said: "These communists took over the Tsarist police and made them worse. The Tsarist police persecuted the political opposition but never touched their families. These people touch families too. Nothing good will come of it."

Rostow entered Yale University at the age of 15 on a full scholarship and graduated at 19. He then won a Rhodes Scholarship to study at Balliol College, Oxford, where he completed a B.Litt. degree. At Oxford, Rostow became friends with future British politicians Edward Heath and Roy Jenkins, being especially close to the latter. In 1936, during the Edward VIII abdication crisis, he assisted broadcaster Alistair Cooke, who reported on the events for the NBC Radio Network. After returning to Yale University, completing his PhD in 1940, he started teaching economics at Columbia University.

== Professional and academic career ==
During World War II, Rostow served in the Office of Strategic Services under William Joseph Donovan. Among other tasks, he participated in selecting targets for US bombardment. Attorney General Nicholas Katzenbach later joked: "I finally understand the difference between Walt and me [...] I was the navigator who was shot down and spent two years in a German prison camp, and Walt was the guy picking my targets." In September 1942, Rostow arrived in London to serve as an intelligence analyst with the Enemy Objectives Unit, serving until the spring of 1945.

In January 1943, Rostow was given the task of identifying the key industries that supported the German war economy. As an intelligence analyst, Rostow became convinced in 1943 that oil was Germany's Achilles heel, and if the United States Army Air Force were to target the Romanian oil fields together with the plants for making artificial oil and oil storage facilities within Germany itself, then the war would be won, a strategy known as the "Oil Plan". By early 1944, Rostow had finally won over General Carl Spaatz to the merits of the "Oil Plan". In early 1944, there was much debate about the merits of the "Oil Plan" vs. the "Transportation Plan" of targeting the German and French railroad system. The "Transportation Plan" was implemented first as part of the run-up to Operation Overlord.

The "Oil Plan" began to be implemented as a strategy by the Army Air Force in May 1944, which Rostow later called a disastrous error, claiming if the "Oil Plan" had been adopted earlier, the war would have been won far earlier. He also claimed that the United States would have entered into the Cold War in a far stronger position as he always maintained that if "Oil Plan" had been adopted earlier it would have allowed the U.S. Armed Forces to push deeper into Central Europe and even into Eastern Europe. Based on his World War II experiences, Rostow became a convinced advocate of strategic bombing, arguing that it was the bombing campaign against Germany's cities that had won the war. For his work with the Enemy Objectives Unit during the war, Rostow was awarded an OBE.

== Postwar ==
In 1945, immediately after the war, Rostow became assistant chief of the German-Austrian Economic Division in the United States Department of State in Washington, D.C. Rostow was invited to part in the United States Strategic Bombing Survey (USSBS), an assessment of the effects of the strategic bombing campaign on Germany's economy, but he declined. Several of Rostow's future foes in the 1960s such as George Ball, John Kenneth Galbraith and Arthur M. Schlesinger Jr. did take part in the USSBS, and came away convinced that the strategic bombing campaign did not cripple the German economy as its advocates had promised, an experience that led these men to doubt the efficacy of bombing North Vietnam. Though the "Oil Plan" did indeed work as Rostow had promised, those taking part in the USSBS also noted that German industrial production peaked in December 1944, which led them to doubt the effects of strategic bombing as a way of breaking a nation's economy. In 1946, he returned to Oxford as the Harold Vyvyan Harmsworth Professor of American History.

In 1947, he became the assistant to the Executive Secretary of the Economic Commission for Europe, and was involved in the development of the Marshall Plan. One of Rostow's colleagues recalled: "In early 1946, Walt Rostow had a revelation that the unity of Germany could not be achieved without the unity of Europe, and that the unity of Europe could best be approached crabwise through technical cooperation in economic matters, rather than bluntly in diplomatic negotiations." Rostow's writings on the subject of European economic unity attracted the attention of Undersecretary of State Dean Acheson, and ultimately Jean Monnet, the French diplomat regarded as the "father" of the European Coal and Steel Community of 1951 that became the European Economic Community in 1957.

Rostow spent a year at Cambridge University as the Pitt Professor of American History and Institutions. He was professor of economic history at the Massachusetts Institute of Technology (MIT) from 1950 to 1961, and a staff member at the Center for International Studies (CIS) at the MIT from 1951 to 1961. The North Korean invasion of South Korea decisively altered Rostow's thinking about the Soviet Union. Until the Korean War, Rostow had believed that the Soviet system would ultimately "mellow" on its own accord and he had also viewed the Cold War as a largely diplomatic conflict as opposed to a military struggle. The North Korean aggression against South Korea convinced him that the Cold War required a more militarized foreign policy as he called for greater defense spending in a speech in the fall of 1950 so a "larger full mobilization could be carried out quickly." To pay for the higher amount of defense spending, Rostow urged the American people to accept the need for a "very high level of taxation appropriated equally".

From late 1951 to August 1952, Rostow headed the Soviet Vulnerabilities Project. The project, which was sponsored by the CIS and received significant support from the U.S. government, sought to identify Soviet vulnerabilities with regard to political/psychological warfare, and it received contributions from top Sovietologist and psychological warfare specialists. In June 1955, Rostow headed a group of stalwart cold warriors who were called the Quantico Vulnerabilities Panel which issued a report that advocated nuclear coercion of the Soviet Union. Although the experts were invited by Nelson Rockefeller, their proposal ran contrary to the policy of the Eisenhower administration.

In 1954, Rostow advised President Dwight Eisenhower on economic and foreign policy, and in 1958 he became a speechwriter for him. In May 1954, Rostow was deeply shocked when he heard of the French Union defeat at the Battle of Dien Bien Phu, expressing his disgust that French leaders had failed to create a political alignment which would "effectively rally the Vietnamese against the Communists". Rostow believed the Communist Viet Minh fighting for independence from France were a small, radical terrorist minority entirely unrepresentative of the Vietnamese people, the majority of whom he believed supported the French-dominated, but nominally independent State of Vietnam created in 1950. At the same time, he lashed out at Eisenhower for "refusing to involve American units in combat" as a plan had been drafted code-named Operation Vulture calling for the American intervention in the First Indochina War with tactical nuclear weapons. Eisenhower had Operation Vulture contingent upon British involvement, and when the British predictably refused to become involved, used that as an excuse not to execute Operation Vulture.

In August 1954, Rostow and fellow CIA-connected MIT economics professor Max F. Millikan convinced Eisenhower to massively increase US foreign aid for development as part of a policy of spreading what he saw as "American-style" economic growth in Asia and elsewhere, backed by the military. Unlike many of the first generation of "Cold Warriors" who saw the Cold War in essentially Euro-centric terms, Rostow viewed the Cold War as a global struggle in which the Third World was its most important battlefield. Rostow often accused people such as George F. Kennan and Dean Acheson of being racists because they viewed Europe as being far more important than Asia.

On 26 February 1958, Rostow first met Senator John F. Kennedy, who was impressed with the academic who understood power. On 27 February 1958, Rostow appeared as a witness before the Senate Foreign Relations Committee, where as prearranged, Kennedy asked him a question about American economic aid to India, which led to the reply the "present aid program, which amounts to about $290 million this year, is grossly inadequate". The purpose of the testimony was to embarrass Eisenhower whom both men believed was neglecting the Third World. Rostow wrote two speeches for Kennedy, which he delivered on the Senate floor, attacking the Eisenhower administration for ignoring India, while the Soviet Union was not, and led ultimately India being granted $150 million in exchange credits from the Import-Export Bank later that year. In September 1958, Rostow left to take a professorship at Cambridge University, where he started writing his magnum opus, a book intended to debunk Marxism as a theory that became The Stages of Economic Growth. At a time when Nikita Khrushchev was boasting that the Soviet Union with its Five Year Plans would soon surpass the United States as the world's dominant economic power because what he interpreted as Marxist theory explained both the past and the future, there was much desire in the American political and intellectual establishments to assess its ideological dimensions.

== The Stages of Economic Growth ==
In 1960, Rostow published The Stages of Economic Growth: A Non-Communist Manifesto, which proposed the Rostovian take-off model of economic growth, one of the major historical models of economic growth, which argues that economic modernization occurs in five basic stages of varying length: traditional society, preconditions for take-off, take-off, drive to maturity, and high mass consumption. This became one of the important concepts in the theory of modernization in social evolutionism. A product of its time and place, the book argued that one of the central problems of the Cold War as understood by American decision-makers, namely that there were millions of people living in poverty in the Third World whom Communism appealed to, could be solved by a policy of modernization to be fostered by American economic aid and growth. The book was highly influential, bringing modernization theory to prominence.

Rostow began the book with the question about where the world was going, asking "Is it taking us to Communism, or the affluent suburbs, nicely rounded out with social overhead capital; to destruction; to the moon; or where?" Using the Industrial Revolution in Britain as his case study, Rostow sought to rebut Karl Marx's construction of history, arguing that Marx's reading of British history, which he based much of his theories upon, was defective. The book was essentially a call for greater American involvement in the Third World as Rostow wrote that much of the Third World was struck in the "traditional stage" or "preconditions for take-off" stage, but with a little help from the US could reach the "take-off" stage. The Stages concluded: "We must demonstrate that the underdeveloped nations ... can move successfully through the preconditions into a well established take-off within the orbit of the democratic world, resisting the blandishments and temptations of Communism. This is, I believe, the most important item on the Western agenda.".

Guy Ortolano argues that as an alternative to Marxist class-oriented analysis Rostow replaced class with nation as the agent of history. British history then became the base for comparisons. However Rostow never explicitly offered the British case as the ideal model for nations to copy. Many commentators assumed that was his goal and attention turned to issues of American exceptionalism, and the argument that Britain created the modern economy.

Rostow's thesis was criticized at the time and subsequently as universalizing a model of Western development that could not be replicated in places like Latin America or sub-Saharan Africa. Another line of criticism was his thesis that societies based upon "mass production" and "mass consumption" like those of the West were the ideal society that everyone in the world wanted to emulate. At the time, critical reception was extremely favourable with a book review by Harry Schwarz in The New York Times speaking of Rostow's "impressive achievement" of writing "one of the most influential economic books of the twentieth century". In a review in The Christian Science Monitor wrote: "There is a sharp intelligence at work, producing paragraphs and pages which seem to distill events to an almost unbearable simplicity. This is the special quality of the writer and the book." Adlai E. Stevenson II wrote in a letter to Rostow: "Is the future Rostowism vs. Marxism? If so, I am ready to vote now."

Much of the success of The Stages at the time was due to the fact that it addressed seminal issues in a style that was easy to understand but was sufficiently intellectual enough not to be dismissed as facile and shallow. Like the various theories of Marxism that he had hoped to debunk, Rostow offered up a grand theory, in this case, the "modernization theory" that explained the past and predicted the future. The Swiss scholar Gilbert Rist wrote of "Rostow's marvelous fresco of humanity marching towards greater happiness" and his theories as "Marxism without Marx" as Rostow asserted that capitalism was inevitably destined to triumph because, in his view, it was the superior system. The American historian Michael Shafer wrote about the modernization theory as "a logical construct, deduced from a set of universal axioms abstracted from the realm of human and temporal contingencies."

In South Korea, at the time a Third World nation, much interest in Rostow's book was expressed by both economists and policy-makers. Rostow's concept of "economic take-off" especially appealed to the South Korean president, General Park Chung Hee, who often used that phrase in his speeches calling for South Koreans to work harder so that their nation could rise up to a First World economy. Park, who seized power in a 1961 coup d'état, starting in 1962 inaugurated a policy of five year plans under which the South Korean chaebol had to meet certain targets set by the government as part of the push to reach the "economic take-off" stage. A 1969 book Theory and Condition of Korean Economic Development published by the government had 17 essays by leading economists, of which half described sought to apply the theories set out in The Stages of Economic Growth to South Korea.

== Service under the Kennedy and Johnson administrations ==
The Stages of Economic Growth impressed presidential candidate John F. Kennedy, who appointed Rostow as one of his political advisers and sought his advice. After attempting unsuccessfully to be appointed to a major post under the Eisenhower administration, Rostow had decided to try his luck with Kennedy in 1960. During the 1960 presidential election, Rostow served as a speech-writer and adviser for the Kennedy campaign, where he became known as an "effervescent idea man". Rostow wrote the speech calling for a "New Frontier", which Kennedy gave at the 1960 Democratic National Convention. The favorable reception to the "New Frontier" speech led Kennedy to promise Rostow a senior position if he won the election. Rostow also coined the slogan of Kennedy's 1960 campaign, "Let's Get the Country Moving Again". Initially, Kennedy wanted to give Rostow a major post in his administration. Rostow wrote a policy paper in December 1960 outlining the incoming Kennedy administration's "flexible response" nuclear posture, which was to replace the Eisenhower administration's "massive retaliation" nuclear doctrine, in which he stressed that the United States should be willing to use nuclear weapons in Southeast Asia to counter a "possible breakout" by China. Dean Rusk, whom Kennedy had nominated to serve as his secretary of state, vetoed Rostow's appointment.

=== Deputy National Security Advisor ===
When Kennedy became president in 1961, he appointed Rostow as deputy to his national security assistant McGeorge Bundy. Though Rostow was Bundy's deputy, in practice he served as an equal. On 6 January 1961, just before Kennedy's inauguration as president, the Soviet leader, Nikita Khrushchev, delivered a speech in Moscow declaring that the Soviet Union was able and willing to support any "war of national liberation" anywhere in the Third World. Khrushchev's speech was largely a response to the Sino-Soviet split of 1960, during which Mao Zedong had accused him of "revisionism" and denounced the Soviet Union for not supporting Third World anticolonial and nationalist movements. Mao announced that he regarded himself as the proper leader of the world Communist movement, causing Khrushchev to strike back with his speech in Moscow. Missing the context of Sino-Soviet rivalry, Kennedy and his advisers regarded Khrushchev's speech as a bold new Soviet gambit for world domination, making the subject of the Third World a key concern for him. The first meeting of the National Security Council under Kennedy on 28 January 1961 was entirely devoted to the subject of the Third World; the president read out excerpts of Khrushchev's "wars of national liberation speech" to underline the danger posed to US interests by the USSR. Rostow, who always saw the Third World as the main "battlefield" of the Cold War, enjoyed much influence with the new president at first. As the apostle of modernization, Rostow laid out policies to counter Communism in the Third World.

Rostow supported the Bay of Pigs invasion, albeit with reservations, arguing that the existence of a Communist government in Cuba was unacceptable as otherwise the rest of Latin America might be "infected" with Communism. Along the same lines, Rostow was the main inspiration for the Alliance for Progress, a $20 billion aid program for Latin America launched with great fanfare by Kennedy in 1961. In a speech written by Rostow, Kennedy said that the Alliance for Progress would allow Latin America to reach the "economic take-off" stage of growth by having an annual growth rate of 2.5% (a target chosen by Rostow), which would end the appeal of Communism in Latin America forever. Rostow was also instrumental in persuading Kennedy that the best way to fight Communism in the Third World in general, not just in Latin America, was to increase aid, and in 1961 American aid to the rest of the Third World went up to $4.5 billion from $2.5 billion in 1960. In a speech written by Rostow, Kennedy announced that the 1960s would be the "Decade of Development", saying that the United States was willing and able to furnish sufficient foreign aid to allow the Third World nations to reach the "economic take-off" stage.

Rostow annoyed Kennedy as an "idea-a-minute man"; he complained that Rostow had too many ideas for his own good and was unable to focus on what was really important. Kennedy's main complaint was that Rostow would offer up a deluge of rapid-fire ideas, which made him hard to follow. Kennedy had come into the White House in January 1961 as a confirmed hawk, who during the 1960 election had criticized Eisenhower as "soft on Communism" for not overthrowing Fidel Castro, but the disaster of the Bay of Pigs invasion in April had cooled his martial ardor. After the Bay of Pigs invasion, he came to distrust the hawkish advice he received from the Central Intelligence Agency and the Joint Chiefs of Staff. Kennedy also rejected the hawkish advice he received from Rostow, charging that the experts had all told him the Bay of Pigs invasion could not possibly fail. Just after the Bay of Pigs invasion, Kennedy rejected advice from Rostow to send U.S. troops to intervene in the Laotian Civil War. The economist John Kenneth Galbraith advised his friend Kennedy that Laos was not worth a war, and Kennedy himself noted that supplying forces in Laos would present severe logistical problems. Finally remembering how the approach of American forces upon the Yalu river had led to Chinese intervention in the Korean War, the president was concerned that intervening in Laos would cause a war with China that he did not want. Instead, Kennedy sent the diplomat W. Averell Harriman to negotiate an agreement to "neutralize" Laos, which marked the beginning of the feud between Rostow and Harriman, as the former started to see the latter as an appeaser.

Kennedy also claimed that Rostow was too fixated on Vietnam, saying he seemed to have an obsession with it. Rostow believed in the "Domino Theory", predicting that if South Vietnam fell, the rest of Southeast Asia and ultimately India would fall as well. As early as June 1961, Rostow was advising Kennedy to bomb North Vietnam. During the Berlin crisis of 1961, Rostow advised Kennedy: "We must find ways of putting pressure on Khrushchev's side of the line with conventional forces or other means ... We must begin now to present Khrushchev with the risk that if he heightens the Berlin crisis, we and the West Germans may take action that will cause East Germany to come unstuck." The particular action that Rostow advised Kennedy to take was to "take and hold a piece of territory in East Germany that Khrushchev may not wish to lose (for example, Magdeburg)". Kennedy rejected this advice as too dangerous, stating that having U.S. forces seize part of East Germany would almost certainly cause a nuclear war with the Soviet Union.

=== Director of Policy Planning ===
Later in 1961, Rostow became Director of the State Department's Policy Planning Staff. At the time, Kennedy commented: "Walt is a fountain of ideas; perhaps one in ten of them is absolutely brilliant. Unfortunately six or seven are not merely unsound, but dangerously so. I admire his creativity, but it will be more comfortable to have him creating at some remove from the White House."

Kennedy told Rostow that his being demoted from the White House to the State Department was because: "Over here in the White House we have to play with a very narrow range of choices...We can't do long-range planning; it has to be done over there. I want you to go over there and catch hold of the process at the level where it counts". Appealing to Kennedy's Catholicism, Rostow complained that: "I am going from being a priest in Rome to being a bishop in the provinces."

In October 1961, Rostow went on a fact-finding mission with General Maxwell Taylor to South Vietnam and he returned full of enthusiasm for greater American involvement in what he stated "might be the last great confrontation" with Communism. The report that Taylor and Rostow wrote advocated that Kennedy send between 6,000 and 8,000 U.S Army troops to fight in South Vietnam under the guise of being "flood relief workers". Kennedy rejected the Taylor-Rostow report's recommendation that he send troops to fight in South Vietnam, but accepted the report's other recommendations calling for more military and economic aid to South Vietnam. Karnow described Rostow as a man who "seemed to revel in the war" as it appeared that he wanted to prove that a short, bald, bespectacled New York intellectual could be just as hard, tough and macho as the idealized World War II veteran that Hollywood kept portraying in action films at the time. Rostow had served in World War II as an intelligence analyst with the task of selecting bombing targets in Germany, an important, but comfortable "desk job" that ensured he never saw combat, a point about which he was very sensitive.

In February 1962, President Ngo Dinh Diem introduced the strategic hamlet program of forcibly relocating peasants to strategic hamlets as a way of severing the population from the Viet Cong guerrillas. Though impetus for the Strategic Hamlet Program came from Diem, Rostow supported the program as a way of breaking down the "traditional person", arguing that the strategic hamlets would be agents of modernization. He remained baffled as to why the strategic hamlets were so unpopular with South Vietnamese peasants. In 1962, Rostow drafted the statement of Basic National Security Policy (BNSP), a 284-page document meant to outline the foreign policy of the Kennedy administration. Reflecting his interest in the modernization theory, Rostow identified the Third World, especially "the arc from Iran to Korea" as the most important "battlefield" of the Cold War. Through to some extent based upon the theory of "containment" as argued by George F. Kennan in the 1940s, Rostow's BNSP argued for the United States to promote economic growth in the Third World and for the creation of "a wider community of free nations, embracing Latin America, Africa, Asia and the Middle East". Kennan, who was serving as the US ambassador in Belgrade at the time, reviewed the BNSP and vigorously criticized the document. Kennan attacked Rostow's advocacy of a winnable nuclear war, writing he would "rather see my children dead" than live in a world devastated by nuclear war. Kennan also criticized Rostow's optimism about progress in the Third World, writing that the Third World was hopelessly backward and might be a danger to the US if allowed to progress. However, some of the statements in Kennan's critique, where he argued that a First World standard of living was "peculiar to peoples who have had their origins on or near the shores of the North Sea" or to nations descended from such peoples like the United States allowed Rostow to accuse Kennan with some justification of racism.

During the Cuban Missile Crisis, Rostow was mostly excluded from the decision-making process, having only one meeting with Kennedy during the crisis where he advised him to stop Soviet ships carrying oil to Cuba, advice that was not taken. Unaware that Kennedy had promised not to invade Cuba and to pull American missiles out of Turkey as part of the resolution, Rostow saw the Cuban Missile Crisis as a triumph, which proved the superior power of the United States. Inspired by the Cuban Missile crisis, Rostow on 28 November 1962 called in a memo for the bombing of North Vietnam, writing: "The whole lesson of the Cold War including the recent Cuba crisis is that Communists do not escalate in response to our actions". In 1962, Rostow started to advocate what became known in Washington as the "Rostow Thesis", namely if the United States bombed North Vietnam along the same lines that Germany and Japan were bombed in World War II, then the North Vietnamese would have to cease trying to overthrow the government of South Vietnam.

In 1963, Rostow first advocated invading North Vietnam, arguing for American and South Vietnamese landings on the coast of North Vietnam as the prelude for reuniting Vietnam under the Saigon government. In a policy paper addressed to the Assistant Secretary of State for Asian Affairs, W. Averell Harriman, dated 2 February 1963, that began with the sentence: "Before you decide your old and respectful friend has gone off his rocker...", Rostow advocated invading North Vietnam. As the approach of U.S. troops to the Yalu River in 1950 led to the Chinese intervention in the Korean War, it was generally accepted within Washington that invading North Vietnam would likewise lead to a war with China. For this reason, Harriman was not impressed with Rostow's paper and advised Kennedy to send Rostow back to his perch in academia, saying that Rostow was far too blasé about the possibility of a nuclear war with China. The Chinese nuclear program was well advanced by 1963, and in 1964 China exploded its first atomic bomb, followed by its first hydrogen bomb in 1967. Rostow underlined this consideration in a paper written in July 1963, stating it would be best to invade North Vietnam before the Chinese "blow a nuclear device". Harriman was one of the richest men in the United States, who was very generous in donating to the Democratic Party, and as such served as a friend and adviser to every Democratic president from Roosevelt to Johnson. The persistence which Rostow advocated invading North Vietnam even after the first Chinese nuclear test in 1964 worried Harriman, and he consistently sought to curtail Rostow's influence, making him into one of Rostow's main enemies in Washington.

After Kennedy's assassination, his successor Lyndon B. Johnson promoted Rostow to McGeorge Bundy's job after he wrote Johnson's first State of the Union speech. Kennedy had generally ignored Rostow's advice, but Johnson started to pay attention to him after he wrote a paper in February 1964 stating a strategic bombing campaign against North Vietnam would be enough to win the war. When the American ambassador to Laos, William H. Sullivan, wrote in February 1964 he did not believe a strategic bombing campaign would be decisive as the Viet Cong had a "sustaining strength of their own", Rostow was ferocious, arguing the Viet Cong had no real basis of support in South Vietnam and only existed because North Vietnam was supporting them. The idea that Communism had an appeal to least some of South Vietnam's people was anathema to Rostow, who insisted that there was no civil war in South Vietnam and there was only a struggle between North Vietnam and South Vietnam.

The papers Rostow wrote urged a policy of "graduated" pressure as the United States would steadily increase the level of bombing to such a point that it would ultimately lead to the destruction of North Vietnam's nascent industry. Unlike most American decision-makers, who knew nothing of Vietnam's history, Rostow had done much reading on the subject and had learned that over the centuries that Chinese elites considered Vietnam a lost province which they would one day reclaim (Vietnam had been a Chinese province from 111 BC to 938 AD), leading to a long series of Vietnamese-Chinese wars as successive Vietnamese emperors fought off attempts by the emperors of China to incorporate Vietnam into the middle kingdom. Knowing of the full depth of the Sino-Vietnamese enmity, Rostow reached the conclusion that Ho Chi Minh would not want his nation to draw too close to China, and as such, could not risk the destruction of North Vietnam's industry, which would leave North Vietnam entirely dependent upon China. One of Rostow's opponents, George Ball, argued that Ho's Vietnamese nationalism would make him an Asian version of Josip Broz Tito of Yugoslavia, a communist leader who wanted his nation to be independent of both Moscow and Beijing. Ball argued that South Vietnam was a poor and politically unstable ally that contributed little to American national security, and allowing Ho to reunify Vietnam would pose no danger to the United States. Rostow, by contrast, argued that South Vietnam was crucial to American national security, and to allow the first "domino" to fall would cause the other "dominoes" in Southeast Asia. In his mind, losing any nation to communism, even it was of the Titoist type was unacceptable.

Rostow championed the idea of Congress giving President Johnson the power to wage war in Southeast Asia, an idea that he first suggested in February 1964. Rostow pointed out in a memo to the president that the degree of escalation in the Vietnam war envisioned by the administration would pose constitutional and legal problems as the constitution gave Congress, not the president, the right to declare war; and the level of escalation envisioned would be a war in everything but name. Rostow's solution to this problem was for Congress to pass a resolution giving the president the legal power to essentially wage a war in Vietnam.

When Congress passed the Gulf of Tonkin Resolution on 10 August 1964, which was the closest thing to a declaration of war that the United States had in Vietnam, Rostow was well pleased. About the Gulf of Tonkin incident that led to the resolution, Rostow later said: "We don't know what happened, but it had the desired effect". In the context of the 1964 election, Johnson found the idea of a gradual process of escalating American involvement in Vietnam appealing as it allowed him to present both as a "tough" president while also less extreme than the Republican opponent, Senator Barry Goldwater. Rostow's consistent advocacy of strategic bombing against North Vietnam as the decisive way to win the war endeared him to Johnson as it promised a "cheap" victory that would not cost too many American lives. In November 1964, Rostow advised Johnson to commit U.S. ground forces to Vietnam to prove that "we are prepared to face down any form of escalation" and to send "massive" naval and air forces to strike North Vietnam and, if necessary, China as well. In a memo to Johnson, Rostow wrote: "They [the Vietnamese Communists] will not actually accept a setback until they are sure that we mean it" and needed to know that "they now confront a LBJ who has made up his mind".

Political scientist Charles King writes of Rostow's tenure in the Kennedy and Johnson administrations,

nearly every strategic move Rostow advocated turned out to be wrong, from escalating the commitment of U.S. combat troops for South Vietnam to rejecting peace talks with the North Vietnamese. Since he continued to defend those positions after most other people had concluded they were mistakes, his name became a byword for a specific kind of Washington virtue: offering terrible advice but at least doing so consistently.

== National Security Advisor ==
=== Vietnam War ===
As national security advisor beginning on 1 April 1966, Rostow was responsible for developing the government's policy in Vietnam, and he was convinced that the war could be won, becoming Johnson's main war hawk and playing an important role in bringing Johnson's presidency to an end. Rostow was extremely close to Johnson, later recalling:

Johnson took me into his house as well as his staff, into his family; took my family in as well. It was an open-hearted, human relationship. I came to hold the greatest possible affection for him, love for him, as well as respect for the job. I had an enormous compassion for what he was bearing during those years, for what the family was bearing.

At the time the appointment of Rostow as National Security Advisor was well received by almost all of the American media, praising Johnson for appointing such an eminent economist and historian to advise him. In an editorial The New York Times wrote that Rostow was:

a scholar with an original mind as well as an experienced official and policy planner ... one of the architects of John F. Kennedy's foreign policy ... Mr. Rostow, of course, will be only one of the President's principal advisers, and Mr. Johnson will make his own decisions. But the appointment places beside the President an independent and cultivated mind that, as in the Bundy era, should assure comprehension both of the intricacies of world problems and of the options among which the White House must choose. No President could ask for more.

Johnson stated at the time that: "I'm getting Walt Rostow as my intellectual. He's not your intellectual. He's not Bundy's intellectual. He's not Schlesinger's intellectual. He's not Galbraith's intellectual. He's going to be my Goddamn intellectual!" Johnson, because of his origins as a man from the impoverished, harsh world of Texas who spoke his English with a heavy Texas twang and who had rather crude manners, always felt a certain sense of inferiority when dealing with patrician Ivy League intellectuals such as McGeorge Bundy, Arthur Schlesinger and John Kenneth Galbraith, who all served under Kennedy. Kennedy and his closest advisers always regarded Johnson as "white trash" from Texas, a vulgar man whose company had to be endured rather than enjoyed. Johnson felt that Rostow's status as a Jewish intellectual from New York who likewise worked his way up from poverty made him into a kindred soul in a way that "Kennedy's intellectuals" never could be for him. One of Johnson's favorite advisers, Jack Valenti, recommended Rostow to the president.

Johnson's background growing up poor on a farm in Texas left him with a sympathy for the underprivileged, and he was very interested in Rostow's plans for Third World development. Rostow later recalled about Johnson: "he was always for the underdog". Although Johnson believed that Africa was a hopeless disaster, he had great hopes for developing Latin America and Asia, remembering how the New Deal infrastructure projects of the 1930s had transformed Texas, until then a very backward state. As Rostow's specialization was the subject of the economic modernization of the Third World, his area of expertise appealed to the president, who often talked grandly of his plans to bring electricity to the rural areas of South Vietnam as the necessary prelude to ending poverty in South Vietnam. Finally, Rostow's consistently optimistic appraisal of the Vietnam war appealed to Johnson while his reputation as a hardliner was meant to signal that Johnson was prepared to do whatever it took to win the war. The abrasive Johnson, who was notorious within Washington for mistreating his staff, "initiated" Rostow by humiliating him by first leaking news of his appointment to the press, and then calling up to accuse him of being the leak. After unleashing a torrent of obscenities and screaming at him, the president hung up the phone without giving Rostow a chance to reply. Johnson always "initiated" his staff by humiliating them in some way to assert his dominance, and Rostow seems not to have taken it personally.

Rostow consistently argued to Johnson that any effort at a peaceful resolution to the Vietnam War would be "capitulation". In his reports to Johnson, Rostow always put the emphasis on information that portrayed the United States as winning, becoming Johnson's favourite adviser on foreign affairs. The optimistic reports that the hawkish Rostow wrote were much preferred by the president to the more pessimistic reports written by the "doves" in the administration. A typical memo from Rostow on 25 June 1966 read: "Mr. President, you can smell it all over. Hanoi's operation, backed by the Chicoms [Chinese Communists], is no longer being regarded as the wave of the future out there. U.S. power is beginning to be felt". The Ambassador-At-Large W. Averell Harriman called Rostow "America's Rasputin" as he considered him to have a sinister power over Johnson's mind, as he always pressed the president to take a harder line on Vietnam against the advice of his more dovish staff, Harriman included. Johnson was not enthusiastic about the Vietnam War, later telling his biographer Doris Kearns in a very gendered language that the Great Society was "the woman I really loved" while the Vietnam War was "that bitch of a war on the other side of the world". As a president, Johnson had often in private complained that he much rather focus on his "Great Society" program intended to end poverty and racism in America and that the Vietnam War was an unwanted distraction. Given these views, Harriman found it mystifying that Johnson should shun his advice about finding a way for the United States to gracefully exit Vietnam while accepting the counsel of Rostow.

Johnson remembered how the "Loss of China" in 1949 had badly damaged the Democratic administration of Harry S. Truman who was excoriated by the Republicans as "soft on communism" and criminally negligent in allowing the "loss of China", attacks that resonated with the American people at the time. Johnson once told a reporter Joseph Kraft, in an "off-the-record" conversation:

I knew that Harry Truman and Dean Acheson had lost their effectiveness from the day the Communists took over China. I believe that the loss of China had played a large role in the rise of Joe McCarthy. And I knew that all these problems, taken together, were chickenshit compared with what might happen if we lost Vietnam ... I don't give a damn about these little pinkos on the campuses, they're just waving their diapers and bellyaching because they don't want to fight. The great black beast for us is the right wing. If we don't give this war over soon they'll put enormous pressure on us to turn it into an Armageddon and wreck all our other programs.

Johnson was fearful that if he allowed the "loss of Vietnam", it would cause a similar right-wing backlash that would allow a "reactionary" Republican to win the presidency and for the GOP to take control of Congress, and together they would end his Great Society program along with the rest of Johnson's civil rights legislation. Much of Rostow's influence on Johnson was due to his insistence that to protect his domestic achievements that Johnson had to fight the Vietnam war, and moreover that the war was eminently winnable provided that the correct policies were followed. For Johnson, Rostow offered him a way out of an unpleasant situation of fighting a war in Vietnam that he rather not fight to protect the Great Society by promising him what Rostow insisted was a path to victory, as Rostow noted that presidents who win wars were usually also popular presidents.

In particular, Rostow persistently argued to the president that a programme of sustained bombing would force North Vietnam to cease its support of the Viet Cong and thus win the war. Rostow believed that strategic bombing alone would be enough to force North Vietnam to capitulate, and became the main advocate in the White House of Operation Rolling Thunder, the bombing offensive launched against North Vietnam in February 1965. Initially, Rostow believed in only bombing certain targets as a way of warning Hanoi to cease supporting the Viet Cong, but he changed his mind, coming to favour an all-out bombing offensive that would completely destroy the economy of North Vietnam. Reflecting the lessons of the Oil Plan, Rostow in particular believed that the destruction of the North Vietnamese oil storage facilities and the hydroelectric grid would so economically cripple North Vietnam that the war would be won, and he pressed Johnson to end the restrictions on bombing oil shortage tanks and hydro plants. Rostow was opposed by Harriman, who like him had spent much of World War II living in England; however, Harriman had first-hand observed how German bombing of British cities had hardened the will of the British public, and he now argued that American bombing on North Vietnam was having the same effect on the North Vietnamese public.

The fact that Rostow had arrived in London in fall of 1942, when the worst of the German bombing was over, while Harriman as a special envoy for President Franklin D. Roosevelt had witnessed first-hand the "Blitz" against London and other British cities in the winter of 1940–41 contributed to their differing assessments of the effects of bombing. Based on his experiences in wartime, Harriman called the Rostow Thesis "the stick without the carrot".

The first crisis that confronted Johnson and Rostow was the Buddhist Uprising of 1966 in South Vietnam where an attempt by Air Marshal Nguyễn Cao Kỳ to dismiss General Nguyễn Chánh Thi led to a civil war within the civil war as units of the Army of the Republic of Vietnam fought one another, much to the consternation of Johnson who could not believe that America's allies in South Vietnam were fighting each other. Rostow for his part advised the president to fully support Kỳ, charging that the Buddhist Struggle Movement which had rallied behind Thi was being used by the Communists. Rostow told Johnson: "We are faced with the classic revolutionary situation-like Paris in 1789 and St. Petersburg in 1917". Rostow claimed that the Buddhists were just being used by the Viet Cong just as Lenin used Kerensky to take power in 1917, but fortunately American forces were there to save the day. Rostow concluded: "In the face of defeat in the field and Kerensky's weaknesses, Lenin took over in November. This is about what would happen in Saigon if we were not there, but we are there". As the civil war within the civil war between Kỳ and Thi greatly disturbed Johnson, Rostow's advice to side with Kỳ was decisive. The fact that Kỳ expressed much admiration for Hitler, who in his own words was his "only hero" apparently did not offend Rostow. One of Rostow's aides later wrote "Rostow was like Rasputin to a tsar under siege". Rostow's opponent, George Ball wrote about Rostow's influence: "He played to Johnson's weaker side, always creating an image of Johnson standing against the forces of evil. He used to tell him how Lincoln was abused by everybody when he was at a certain stage of the Civil War...He spent a great deal of time creating a kind of fantasy for the president". In August 1966, Harriman warned Rostow against escalating the war to the brink of a nuclear war with China to best preserve life on plant Earth, only to be told "it is only in extreme crises that such settlements will come".

At one point in 1966–67, the hawkish Rostow advocated that the United States invade North Vietnam, even if it meant war with China, a course of action that McNamara rejected as likely to cause a nuclear war. Rostow always maintained that had his advice to the president to invade North Vietnam been taken in 1966 or 1967, the war would have been won, telling Karnow in an interview in 1981 that he was disappointed that Johnson rejected his advice to invade North Vietnam. Johnson remembered how the approach of American forces upon the Yalu river in 1950 led to China intervening in the Korean War, and he was very fearful that an American invasion of North Vietnam would once again lead to a war with China, which now had nuclear weapons. For this reason, Johnson was always against invading North Vietnam as the risks of a nuclear war with China were too awful for him to consider. Through Rostow was disappointed that Johnson rejected his advice to invade North Vietnam, he knew better than to stridently press that idea as that would annoy the president, and instead he brought up the idea of invading North Vietnam every so often a couple of months after Johnson last rejected it. Rostow also chaired a secret "psychological strategy committee" whose purpose was to supply "correct facts" about the Vietnam war to Congress, the media, and the American people in general.

=== Janusz Lewandowski peace proposal ===
In June 1966, Janusz Lewandowski, the Polish delegate to the International Control Commission, which was supposed to police the Geneva Accords of 1954, contacted Giovanni D'Orlandi, the Italian ambassador to South Vietnam, with a peace offer. Lewandowski stated he just spoken with Ho Chi Minh, whom he claimed wanted a "political compromise" to end the war and would go "quite a long way" for such a settlement. Lewandowski reported that Ho was willing to drop his demand that the government of South Vietnam be overthrown, though he preferred that somebody else other than Air Marshal Nguyen Cao Ky serve as premier; asked only the National Liberation Front (better known as the Viet Cong) "take part" in negotiations, instead of serving in the government; and were willing to accept a "reasonable calendar" for the withdrawal of American forces instead demanding their immediate pull-out. The Ambassador-at-Large Harriman and his deputy, the former CIA agent Chester Cooper, were intrigued by the Polish offer, which was backed by the Soviet Union. Ever since 1960, Mao Zedong had been accusing the Soviet Union of capitulating to capitalism and abandoning its principles, and a Sino-Soviet competition had broken out about which of the two states was most willing to support North Vietnam. Lewandowski stated that the Soviets were tired of this economically exhausting competition because every time China increased its support for North Vietnam, the Soviets had to increase their support on an even greater scale just to rebut the Chinese claim that they were "selling out".

D'Orlandi was able to arrange for Lewandowski to meet Henry Cabot Lodge Jr, the U.S. ambassador in Saigon, and the talks went well. By November 1966, it was arranged that John Gronouski, the American ambassador in Warsaw, would meet with North Vietnamese diplomats the next month for peace talks in what was code-named Operation Marigold. By December 1966, United States Air Force aircraft bombed oil facilities and railroad yards in Hanoi, which led the Poles to warn if the U.S. continued to bomb Hanoi, the talks would be aborted. Rostow told the president that he believed that Operation Marigold was a "trap" and the North Vietnamese demand that Hanoi not be bombed anymore showed the bombing campaign was indeed working as he promised it would. On December 6, 1966, Johnson refused Harriman's request to cease bombing Hanoi and a week later, the planned talks in Warsaw were cancelled as the North Vietnamese announced that there would be no peace talks as long as North Vietnam was being bombed. In January 1967, Rostow reported to Johnson that the Viet Cong were "disintegrating" under the American pressure, writing optimistically that the major problem for the Americans in the coming year would be to find the best way to integrate those Viet Cong guerrillas who had surrendered back into civilian life. In a further hopeful sign he reported to the president in the same month that the bloody chaos of the Cultural Revolution had pushed China to the brink of civil war as "Mao's own prestige has been seriously, perhaps irretrievably, tarnished in this yet unavailing fracas". With China collapsing into chaos, he believed that the Chinese would be limited in their ability to support North Vietnam for some time to come. In fact, Mao continued to support North Vietnam during the war with the war serving as a foreign policy counterpart to the Cultural Revolution as the "Great Helmsman" believed that extreme violence was necessary to maintain Communist "purity". The fact that some of Mao's targets in the Cultural Revolution such as Liu Shaoqi and Deng Xiaoping were opposed to increased aid to North Vietnam, preferring that the money be spent on Chinese development instead, gave him an additional reason to support North Vietnam.

=== Operation Sunflower ===
In February 1967, the Soviet Premier Alexei Kosygin visited London, and the British Prime Minister Harold Wilson tried to act as a mediator to end the Vietnam war, offering to serve as an honest broker. Wilson had been asked in 1965 to send a British contingent to fight in Vietnam, but as his Labour Party was stoutly opposed to Britain fighting in Vietnam, he had refused, a move that the normally Anglophile Secretary of State Dean Rusk called a "betrayal". To end a running sore in Anglo-American relations as Wilson was caught between the Americans who were pressuring him to send British forces to Vietnam and his own party who were pressuring not to, the prime minister was keen to end the Vietnam war. Kosygin told Wilson that Soviet influence in North Vietnam was limited as the North Vietnamese sought to play the Soviet Union off against China, but if the Americans were willing to cease their bombing of North Vietnam, the Soviet government would indeed pressure Ho Chi Minh to open peace talks. Speaking on what he thought was a secure telephone line from the Soviet embassy in London to the Kremlin, Kosygin told the Soviet leader Leonid Brezhnev that there was a "great opportunity for peace", through in the same call he admitted that the militant, ultra-leftwing line taken by China would pose problems. Unknown to Kosygin, MI5 had tapped the telephone line and a translated transcript of his call to Brezhnev was forwarded to Wilson. The transcript convinced Wilson that Kosygin was negotiating in good faith, and the prime minister then contracted the Americans.

American decision-makers tended to exaggerate Soviet influence over North Vietnam, and Wilson's message that Kosygin was willing to apply pressure on North Vietnam was seen by Johnson as potentially opening the door for peace. Johnson directed David K. E. Bruce, the U.S. ambassador to the court of St James together with Harriman's deputy Chester Cooper to work alongside Wilson in what was code-named Operation Sunflower. Rostow reminded Johnson of Wilson's "betrayal" in not sending British forces to Vietnam and advised the president not to trust him. Rostow was extremely negative about Operation Sunflower, called Wilson a vain and dishonest man who was working to end the Vietnam war on terms unfavorable to the United States, and did his best to fan Johnson's already strong dislike of Wilson. Johnson only approved of Operation Sunflower because it would be too politically embarrassing to turn an opportunity outright.

Working closely with Bruce and Cooper, Wilson presented a ceasefire offer to Kosygin on 11 February 1967 on behalf of the United States, which Kosygin promised would be passed on to Ho. A few hours later, Cooper left his hotel to attend a performance of Fiddler on the Roof while informing the hotel staff that he would be at the theater if any phone calls came in for him. Cooper was at the theater when an usherette told him that there was an urgent call from Washington, saying that a Mr Rostow wanted to speak with him at once. In his telephone call, Rostow attacked Cooper for the conciliatory tone of Wilson's letter, which he called appeasement, and demanding it be rewritten to make it much tougher, a gesture that Cooper felt was meant to sabotage Operation Sunflower. As demanded by Rostow, a new letter with a considerably more confrontational tone was given to Kosygin, which led him to accuse the British and Americans of negotiating in bad faith.

Wilson in a telephone call to Johnson complained that the letter as rewritten by Rostow had ruined the peace talks and caused "a hell of a situation". Wilson charged that Kosygin had taken a major risk for peace in Vietnam that could have exposed him to criticism within the Politburo and certainly would have exposed him to criticism from the Chinese who constantly accused the Soviets of not doing enough to support North Vietnam, and he felt an opportunity for peace had been gratuitously squandered. Anxious to salvage something from Operation Sunflower, Wilson, Bruce and Cooper put forward a new offer to Kosygin on 12 February that the United States would cease the bombing of North Vietnam in exchange for no more North Vietnamese troops going down the Ho Chi Minh Trail. Johnson added in the condition that North Vietnam had to respond to the offer by noon the next day, a deadline that Bruce called "ridiculous" and Kosygin left London the next day with nothing to show for his peace-making efforts.

Wilson blamed Rostow for the failure of Operation Sunflower, telling his Foreign Secretary George Brown: "I suspect that Rostow himself was largely responsible for the misunderstandings during the Kosygin visit and may well have reported to the president in the light of responsibility." Karnow wrote it is no means certain that Wilson's claim that a "historic opportunity" to end the war in Vietnam in 1967 had been squandered as all Kosygin was promising was to pressure Ho to accept a ceasefire and as he himself noted that when the Soviets pressured the North Vietnamese to do something that they did not want to do, they just drew closer to China. Soviet pressure on North Vietnam tended to most effective in conjugation with China, and in 1967 the Chinese were attacking the Soviets in the most violent terms, accusing them of abandoning true communism, making any possibility of Sino-Soviet pressure on North Vietnam most unlikely. Karnow wrote at most Operation Sunflower offered was a chance to begin negotiations to end the war, and Johnson and Rostow shunned that chance.

=== Martin Luther King Jr's opposition to the Vietnam War ===
In April 1967, the civil rights leader Martin Luther King Jr. came out against the Vietnam War with a speech in New York denouncing the "immoral war" whose burden he charged fall disproportionately heavily on black men who more likely to be drafted to fight in Vietnam. King's speech increased the sense of siege in the White House, and hence Rostow's influence. In July 1967, allegations of police brutality led to race riots in Detroit and Newark. In response to the race riots, conservative Republicans and Democrats accused the Johnson administration's civil rights reforms as being the root reason for the riots. Johnson ordered Rostow to collect "such evidence as there is on external involvement in the violent radical community of the Negro community in the U.S". Johnson was apparently hoping that Rostow would find evidence that the Soviet Union and/or China were behind the riots in Detroit and Newark, but his national security adviser was unable to produce any such evidence. The fact that Rostow was ordered to investigate an essentially domestic matter showed that the president thought very highly of him. As the anti-war protests increased, Rostow was able to reassure Johnson that history will vindicate him, leading the president to remark he was "a man of conviction who doesn't try to play president".

=== Final escalations in Vietnam ===
On 27 April 1967, General William Westmoreland asked for another 200,000 troops for South Vietnam, a request that was supported by Rostow. Rostow went further than Westmoreland by asking Johnson to invade North Vietnam, saying that the American people wanted their president "do something big and hopefully decisive rather than small". At the meeting of the National Security Council, Rostow paced back and forth before a map of Vietnam with a pointer, showing the best way to invade while the Defense Secretary, Robert McNamara, countered him point by point, stating that the dangers of Chinese intervention were far too great. Rostow was so disappointed that Johnson was more influenced by McNamara than himself that he almost resigned in protest, before deciding as he put it to "stay with Johnson until the last day, while steadily, but quietly opposed to the way the war was being fought".

Rostow was finally able to persuade Johnson in June 1967 to bomb North Vietnamese oil storage facilities and hydroelectric plants, arguing that this would cause the collapse of North Vietnam's economy and win the war. By contrast, McNamara reported to the president in the summer of 1967 that even though American bombers by destroying hydroelectric plants had reduced North Vietnam's capacity to generate electricity by 85%, it had failed to impact meaningfully on the war. McNamara argued to Johnson that Rostow did not understand the differences between Germany, an advanced, industrialized First World nation vs. North Vietnam, a backward, rural Third World nation, and that paradoxically that North Vietnam's very backwardness was a form of strength. McNamara noted that even before the American bombing, the total annual hydroelectric production of North Vietnam amounted only to a fifth of the annual hydroelectric production produced by the Potomac Electric Power Company's plant in Alexandria, Virginia. For this reason, McNamara stated that knocking out North Vietnam's hydroelectric plants did not have the same catastrophic effect on the North Vietnamese economy that knocking out America's hydroelectric plants would have had on the American economy. Likewise, North Vietnam imported all of its oil from the Soviet Union, and the North Vietnamese loaded drums of oil from Soviet tankers at sea to sampans, which then entered North Vietnam via that country's intricate network of rivers and canals. For this reason, the destruction of North Vietnam's oil storage tanks by American bombers in 1967 did not affect North Vietnam's capacity to wage war. The North Vietnamese developed a system of hiding the oil drums underground all across the country. Despite all of the devastation caused by the American bombing between 1965 and 1967 with ports destroyed and oil storage tanks left burning, North Vietnam doubled its imports of Soviet oil, reaching an annual total of 1.4 million tons by 1967. The North Vietnamese built some 30,000 miles of tunnels and underground storage areas during the war to escape the bombing. Rostow believed that the bombing tied down North Vietnamese men who might otherwise fight in the war by forcing them to engage in reconstruction work, but the North Vietnamese government had proclaimed a "total war", mobilized the entire population for the war, and put women to work reconstructing the damage done by American bombers. Additionally, some 320,000 Chinese People's Liberation Army soldiers served in North Vietnam between 1965 and 1968 to operate anti-aircraft guns and the SAMs (surface to air missiles) while rebuilding roads and bridges.

=== Israel ===
While working as national security advisor, Rostow became involved in setting the United States' posture towards Israel.

In November 1966, the Israeli Defense Force raided the village of Samu' in the Jordanian-occupied West Bank, a move which angered Rostow as he told the Israeli ambassador Abba Eban that King Hussein of Jordan was an American ally and Johnson very strongly disapproved of the raid. Rostow stated: "Israel for some Machiavellian reason, wanted a leftist regime on the Left bank [of Jordan] so that it could then have a polarized situation in which the Russians would be backing the Arabs and the U.S. backing Israel, and that Israel would not be in an embarrassing position where one of its friends among the Great Powers would also be a friend of an Arab country".

Concerns about Israel's nuclear program were tabled by the United States during the build-up to the Six-Day War and its aftermath. Although he supported military and economic assistance to Israel, Rostow believed that increased public alignment between the two states could run counter to US diplomatic and oil interests in the region. Rostow considered President Gamal Abdel Nasser of Egypt to be a moderating force who through he talked belligerently of war, in fact kept the Arab-Israeli dispute "in the icebox". Rostow wrote in a memo advocating American economic aid to Egypt: "While no one likes the idea of paying off a bully, Nasser is still the most powerful figure in the Middle East...and has restrained wilder Arabs who have for a disastrous Arab-Israeli showdown". After reviewing the May 1967 report from the Atomic Energy Commission team that had inspected Dimona along with other intelligence, Rostow informed President Johnson that, though the team found no evidence of a nuclear weapons program, "there are enough unanswered questions to make us want to avoid getting locked in too closely with Israel. When Egypt remilitarized the Sinai in May 1967, Rostow did not support an Israeli strike against Egypt, instead writing "We sympathize with Eshkol's need to stop these [Palestinian] raids and reluctantly admit that a limited attack on Syria may be his only answer". About the Egyptian remilitarization, Rostow wrote that goals of American policy must be "(a) prevent Israel from being destroyed (b) stop aggression, and (c) to keep U Thant out in front and stiffen his spine". In this regard, Rostow wrote it was essential to persuade the Israeli Prime Minister Levi Eshkol "not to put a match to this fuse". On 22 May 1967, Nasser further escalated the crisis by closing the Straits of Tiran to Israeli shipping, which was a provocation as Israel had always stated that they would go to war to keep the Straits of Tiran open.

When the Israelis claimed that Eisenhower had given Israel a security "guarantee" in 1957 to keep open the Straits of Tiran, a claim that mystified the Americans who had never heard of this "guarantee", Rostow was tasked by Johnson to investigate. The answer was soon found; Eisenhower had written a letter to the Israeli Prime Minister David Ben-Gurion in 1957 committing the United States to "guarantee" that the Straits of Tiran would be kept open to Israeli shipping by the United States. Rostow had to inform the Israelis that only treaties ratified by Congress are binding on the United States, and presidential promises represent only a moral, not a legal commitment on the part of the United States. However, he was later to state: "From the moment Eisenhower made clear that a commitment had been made, Johnson had no doubt that he had to reopen the Straits". Rostow backed the Regatta plan under which a group of various nations would sail their ships through the Strait of Tiran as a show of support for Israel. Rostow believed that the free passage of Israeli ships via the Straits of Tiran was a "naked principle" the United States should uphold even it meant a war with Egypt. As more and more nations backed out of the Regatta plan, Rostow came to take a more hawkish stance, saying to Johnson that Israel should move "like a sheriff in High Noon", using violence "necessary to achieve not merely self-respect, but respect in the region". However, Johnson did not favor war to resolve the crisis, but as he appeared to be backtracking from the Regatta plan, Eshkol wrote Johnson a letter noting that he had not invaded Egypt per American requests, but still the Straits of Tiran were closed to Israeli shipping. Johnson in his reply stated he only promised to use all of his constitutional powers to reopen the Straits of Tiran, noting that because of the Vietnam war, he could not risk getting involving in another war at present, telling Rostow to make that point clear to the Israelis. Rostow told the Israeli envoy Ephraim Evron sent to Washington that Johnson disliked the Israeli "pressure tactics" and needed more time to study the issues. Rostow informed Evron: "You have known President Johnson for a long time and have a right to make your own assessment". Evron predicated that Israel would probably go to war if nothing was done to reopen the Straits of Tiran, telling Rostow that were "about ten days" of peace left.

Though Rostow, Johnson, and Secretary of State Dean Rusk tried to convince Israel not to resort to military force, they supported Israel once the war began. Rostow told the Egyptian ambassador, Mustafa Kamel just before the war: "Your adversaries believe that a surprise attack by Egypt and Syria is imminent. We know this is unthinkable. We cannot believe the government of the UAR [United Arab Republic] would be so reckless. Such a course would obviously have the most serious possible consequences". Rostow added that Israel had also been given a similar "friendly warning" not to escalate. Shortly before the war began, Johnson asked Rostow what he thought Israel was going to do, leading Rostow to reply "they're going to hit". At about 4:35 am on 6 June 1967, Rostow phoned Johnson to tell him that Israel had just attacked Egypt with the Israeli Air Force striking Egyptian Air Force bases all over Egypt. On the first day of the Six Day War, Rostow submitted a report to Johnson about the destruction of the Egyptian Air Force that began: "Herewith the account, with a map, of the first day's turkey shoot". Later that day, Rostow in a memo to the president wrote "we should begin...talking with the Russians and, if possible, with others about the terms of a settlement....A ceasefire will not answer the fundamental questions in the minds of Israelis until they have acquired so much real estate and destroyed so many Egyptian planes and tanks that they are absolutely sure of their bargaining position".

Once the war began, Rostow saw an opportunity for the United States, writing that the issue "was whether the settlement of this war shall be on the basis of armistice agreements, which leave the Arabs in the posture of hostilities towards Israel, keeping alive the Israeli issue in Arab political life as a unifying force, and affording the Soviet Union a handle on the Arab world; or whether a settlement emerges in which Israel is accepted as a Middle Eastern state". Rostow believed that the possibility of Israel gaining territory would allow a "land for peace" deal which might finally end the Arab-Israeli dispute, which led him to advocate no ceasefire to end the war until Israel captured the Golan Heights from Syria as he maintained the Syrians would never make peace until an initiative was provided. Rostow favored having a peace plan calling for "land for peace" deal to be issued by the United Nations, with the negotiations to be mediated by the United States. Rostow made it clear that he did not envision Israel permanently occupying the Gaza Strip, the West Bank, East Jerusalem, the Golan Heights and the Sinai, believing that an occupation would ensure that the Arab-Israeli conflict would never end. By the third day of the Six Day War, Israeli officials were starting to hint that they were not willing to give up some of their recent territorial gains, especially East Jerusalem. In October 1967, Rostow advised Johnson that with Israel "we lean against them just enough to keep their thinking from becoming too quickly set in the concrete of their current extended territorial possessions". When the nuclear issue resurfaced in January 1968, just prior to Prime Minister Levi Eshkol's visit to the United States, Rostow recommended that the president make it clear that the United States expected Israel to sign the NPT.

=== Operation Pennsylvania ===
In September–October 1967, Operation Pennsylvania peace initiative was launched, when a professor of political science at Harvard, Henry Kissinger, got into contact with a French biologist, Herbert Marcovich, who in turns was friends with the French Resistance hero, Raymond Aubrac who was a friend of Ho Chi Minh. Aubrac and Marchovich visited Hanoi to meet Ho to discuss peace. Rostow was opposed to Operation Pennsylvania plan, and turn his best to turn Johnson against it. Under Rostow's influence, Johnson sent a message to Kissinger: "I'm going to give it one more try and if it doesn't work I'm going to come up to Cambridge and cut off your balls!" Kissinger contacted Rostow to urge that the U.S. pause the bombing to give Operation Pennsylvania a chance, only to be rebuffed. Kissinger was later to call Rostow a "fool".

=== Tet Offensive ===
During the siege of Khe Sanh in January 1968, Rostow reported to President Johnson that the North Vietnamese were sending their forces to "re-enact a new Dienbienphu", predicating that Khe Sanh would be the decisive battle in 1968 and the United States must commit all of its forces to prevent the fall of Khe Sahn. In this, Rostow was playing into North Vietnamese hands as the intention by Hanoi was to draw away American forces from the main cities of South Vietnam as the prelude for the Tet Offensive. During the Tet Offensive in 1968, Rostow in a report stated that a Vietcong attack against a remote village in South Vietnam had been timed to coincide with a debate in Congress about appropriations for the war, leading Karnow to sarcastically write "as if tacticians in Hanoi consulted the Congressional Record before deploying their units". During the Tet offensive, Rostow urged Johnson to give a "war leader speech" in preference to a "peace leader speech". In February 1968, Rostow clashed repeatedly with the CIA director, Richard Helms, who accused him of distorting intelligence to present a more optimistic picture of the war than was warranted.

During the debate in Washington in the aftermath of the Tet Offensive about whether to send more troops to South Vietnam or not, Rostow argued that firmness in Vietnam was needed to deter "aggression...in the Middle East, elsewhere in Asia and perhaps even in Europe" and recommended that U.S. ground forces enter North Vietnam and Laos to sever the Ho Chi Minh Trail. Rostow urged Johnson that "it is time for a war leader speech instead of a peace-seeker speech". In the aftermath of the Tet Offensive, Rostow argued that now was the time to finish off the Vietnamese Communists and urged Johnson to send 206,000 more American troops to South Vietnam to join the half-million already there and to bomb North Vietnam even harder. During the debates, the out-going Defense Secretary Robert McNamara, who had been repeatedly bested in debates by Rostow, snapped in fury: "What then? This goddamned bombing campaign, it's worth nothing, it's done nothing, they dropped more bombs than on all of Europe in all of World War II and it hasn't done a fucking thing!" At that point, McNamara, who had become disillusioned with the war he had once supported, broke down in tears, asking Johnson plaintively to stop listening to Rostow and saying the war could not be won. Rostow had supported Johnson's decision to appoint Clark Clifford as Defense Secretary as he was known to be a hawk, and was greatly dismayed when the new defense secretary turned out to be more of a dove than McNamara was.

Johnson was badly spooked by his near-defeat in the New Hampshire Democratic primary, which he won by only 300 votes against the anti-war Senator Eugene McCarthy, a politician whom many people did not take seriously. Even worryingly for Johnson, inspired by this display of presidential weakness in New Hampshire, Senator Robert F. Kennedy, a politician whom many people did take seriously, entered the Democratic primaries on an anti-war platform on 16 March 1968. For the Wisconsin Democratic primary scheduled for 2 April 1968, the polls in March 1968 showed Kennedy in the lead, McCarthy coming in second and Johnson humiliatingly coming in third. Faced with a situation where there was a real possibility of him losing the Democratic nomination to be his party's candidate in the 1968 election, Johnson decided to consider a political as opposed to a military solution to the Vietnam war. Clifford had despite expectations turned out to be more dovish in office, and pressed the president to find an "honorable way out" of Vietnam. Johnson sought the advice of the so-called "wise men", a group of elder statesmen who advised him to find a way to end the war. The leader of the "Wise Men", the former Secretary of State Dean Acheson, told Rostow "tell the president—and you tell him in precisely these words—that he can take Vietnam and stick it up his ass". On 25 March, when Johnson met the "Wise Men", he was informed that "we must take steps to disengage". Johnson's highest level of education had been at the Southwest Texas Teacher's College, and throughout his life, he had much respect for those with university degrees from the "Eastern Establishment". Of the 14 "Wise Men", only General Omar Bradley, Supreme Court Justice Abe Fortas, the diplomat Robert Murphy and General Maxwell Taylor favored fighting on with the other ten favoring disengagement.

=== Paris peace talks ===
During the 1968 election, Rostow did his best to sabotage the peace talks going on Paris as the American delegation led by his old enemy Harriman negotiated with the North Vietnamese in Paris. By this point, Rostow was consumed with hatred for Harriman, and he missed an opportunity to disparage to Johnson. On 3 April 1968, Rostow stated that Harriman should not head the American peace delegation to Paris because "he lacks—and always lacked—an understanding and sympathy with the South Vietnamese". Through Johnson was sympathetic, he argued that Harriman's record as a distinguished diplomat going back to World War II qualified him to head the delegation. Rostow attached to the peace delegation a staffer from the National Security Council, William Jorden, with orders "to keep an eye on those bastards and make sure that they didn't give away the family jewels".

Rostow changed his opinions to suit the president's changed mood in the summer of 1968 and now advised Johnson to limit the bombing raids against North Vietnam. By the time of the Democratic convention in Chicago in August 1968, Rostow approved of the compromise campaign plank of the man who won the Democratic nomination, Vice President Hubert Humphrey, which called for an end of the U.S. bombing of North Vietnam, as by this point he feared that the Republican candidate, Richard Nixon, would win the election. By August 1968, the Democratic Party was tearing itself apart, divisions that were all too apparent at the Democratic convention where anti-war and pro-war Democrats vehemently debated on the convention floor about whatever the United States should continue fighting in Vietnam or not. Given the disarray in the Democratic ranks, it was widely felt if the party did not find a way of unifying itself, Nixon would win. When Humphrey asked for Rostow's help with campaign slogans, Rostow came up with the awkward "We're not going to let a handful of white and black punks turn this country over to Wallace, Strom Thurmond, and those who base their campaigns on their support". By this, Rostow meant that a divided Democratic Party might allow people like George Wallace, the outspoken white supremacist former governor of Alabama who was running for president as a third-party candidate, or Senator Strom Thurmond, a Democrat who turned Republican out of his opposition to civil rights for Afro-Americans, would come to power.

Based upon information provided by the National Security Agency, which broken the South Vietnamese diplomatic codes, senior Johnson administration officials learned that Anna Chennault, the chairwoman of the Republican Women for Nixon group had met the South Vietnamese ambassador, Bùi Diễm, to tell him that South Vietnam should sabotage Paris peace talks to improve the chances of Nixon winning the election. On 29 October 1968, Rostow told Johnson he now had information "on how certain Republicans may have inflamed the South Vietnamese to behave as they have been behaving". Rostow also advised Johnson not to go public with this information, saying he should instead tell Nixon in private to keep away from Chennault, advice which was taken. By the fall of 1968, Rostow had come to feel that it was better if Nixon won the election rather than the "defeatist" Humphrey who on the campaign trail had become increasingly critical of the war. In one of his memos to Johnson, Rostow, who was still unhappy about Johnson's decision not to invade North Vietnam, wrote he should say if asked about civilian-military relations: "Generally speaking, the military has wanted us to use more power, earlier and faster. They may have been right. But the president had other considerations to think of". It was a mark of Rostow's influence that Johnson, who was well known for being abrasive towards subordinates, did not explode in rage as he would have if anyone else wrote such a memo. After the Watergate scandal, Rostow expressed regret for not outing the Nixon campaign for the Chennault Affair and expressed his belief that their success emboldened the Nixon administration to commit worse offenses during the 1972 presidential election.

== Public intellectual ==
When Richard Nixon became president in 1969, Rostow left office, and over the next thirty years taught economics at the Lyndon B. Johnson School of Public Affairs at the University of Texas at Austin with his wife Elspeth Rostow, who later became dean of the school. In 1969, he was told that because of his support for the Vietnam War that he was not welcome to resume teaching at MIT, forcing him to take up a position at the University of Texas. By 1968 the general consensus amongst the liberal American intelligentsia was that the Vietnam War was a horrific mistake of epic proportions and when Rostow left government service in January 1969, he found himself an unpopular figure with the liberal intelligentsia, making it impossible for him to return to MIT. Rostow's biographer, the British historian David Milne, wrote: "In 1969, Rostow's notoriety was such that none of America's elite universities were willing to offer him a job". For a man who had previously held professorships at Harvard, Oxford, Cambridge, and MIT, it was considered within academic circles to be a real comedown for him to teach at the University of Texas at Austin.

He wrote extensively in defense of neoliberal economics, particularly in developing nations. Rostow's successor as National Security Adviser, the Harvard professor, Henry Kissinger, was obsessed with the fear of becoming "this administration's Walt Rostow". Kissinger wanted to resume his professorship at Harvard as he did not want to end up teaching at an "unacceptable" institution like the University of Texas as Rostow did.

Rostow himself noted that the University of Texas campus was ultra-modern as the Texas government had used its oil wealth to create a gleaming, modernistic campus, but complained that the university administration was more interested in supporting the football team, the Longhorns, than in research and teaching. From 1969 to 1971, Rostow served as one of the ghostwriters on Johnson's memoir, The Vantage Point, writing all of the chapters dealing with foreign affairs. As the teaching load at the University of Texas was very light, Rostow had much time for research and between 1969 and 2003 wrote 21 books, mostly on world economic history with a particular focus on economic modernization. In his own memoir, The Diffusion of Power, Rostow argued for the justice of the Vietnam War and lashed out at Kennedy for ignoring his advice in 1962 to invade North Vietnam, writing that this "was the greatest single error of U.S foreign policy in the 1960s". Reflecting his friendship with Johnson, Rostow was less harsh towards him in his memoir, but still he charged that Johnson was too worried about the possibility of a nuclear war with China and should have taken his advice to invade North Vietnam, arguing that the risk of a nuclear war with China was acceptable. The main villain in The Diffusion of Power was McNamara, who Rostow accused of being a defeatist from 1966 onward, charging that it was his weakness and doubts about the war that caused Johnson to hold back and not invade North Vietnam.

In the 1980s, Rostow visited South Korea, whose economy had greatly industrialized under the rule of General Park. During his visit, Rostow praised South Korea as the best example of the theories he set out in The Stages of Economic Growth, arguing that General Park's policies had indeed pushed South Korea into an "industrial take-off". In 1998, Rostow told the South Korean economist Park Taey-Gyun that the experience of South Korea proved the correctness of The Stages of Economic Growth and expressed the wish that more Third World leaders had been like General Park; though the economist Park noted that General Park's policy of Five Year Plans did not reflect Rostow's ideas.

In 1986, a book by Rostow The United States and the Regional Organization of Asia and the Pacific, 1965–1985 was published. In this book, Rostow advanced the thesis that the United States had actually "won" the Vietnam War, as he contended the war had "brought time" for the rest of Southeast Asia to economically advance and escape Communism. Rostow based his argument along the contention that based on the ways things were going in South Vietnam in 1965 that the country would have fallen to the Communists that year, and the American intervention, which though it failed to save South Vietnam in the end, gave an extra ten years to allow the rest of Southeast Asia to economically advance, ensuring that the other "dominoes" did not fall. Rostow argued that the economic success of most of the members of the Association of Southeast Asian Nations, which comprised Indonesia, Malaysia, Singapore, Brunei, Thailand, and the Philippines, was due to the Vietnam War "buying time" for them, as none of those nations ended up being communist and with the exception of the Philippines, all of them were "Asian tigers" (i.e. rapidly growing economies).

In 1995, McNamara published his memoir In Retrospect when he famously declared about the Vietnam War "we were wrong, terribly wrong". On 9 June 1995 in The Times Literary Supplement, Rostow wrote a scathing review of In Retrospect under the title "The Case for the War", where he accused McNamara of insulting all of the families of Americans who died in Vietnam and argued that the United States had in fact "won" the Vietnam War as the non-communist states of Southeast Asia "had quadrupled their real GNP between 1960 and 1981", which Rostow argued would not have happened had the United States not fought in Vietnam. The review in The Times Literacy Supplement reflected the intense feud between McNamara and Rostow; the latter made much of the fact that McNamara often suffered from depression and suggested that his "defeatism" was due to an unsound mind. Rostow believed that McNamara had suffered a nervous breakdown in 1966 and his "defeatism" about Vietnam was due to the fact he had "cracked" under the strain of war. Milne wrote that it is indeed correct that McNamara suffered from bouts of depression, but there is nothing to support Rostow's claim he had lost his mind as Defense Secretary. Milne also wrote that Rostow's assertion that high economic growth rates in Southeast Asia justified the Vietnam War was callous towards the families of all the Americans and Vietnamese who died in the war.

== Honors and awards ==
Rostow received the Order of the British Empire (1945), the Legion of Merit (1945), and the Presidential Medal of Freedom (1969). He was a member of both the American Academy of Arts and Sciences (1957) and the American Philosophical Society (1983).

== Works ==
- Investment and the Great Depression, 1938, Econ History Review
- Essays on the British Economy of the Nineteenth Century, 1948.
- The Terms of Trade in Theory and Practice, 1950, Econ History Review
- The Historical Analysis of Terms of Trade, 1951, Econ History Review
- The Process of Economic Growth, 1952.
- Growth and Fluctuations in the British Economy, 1790–1850: An Historical, Statistical, and Theoretical Study of Britain's Economic Development, with Arthur Gayer and Anna Schwartz, 1953 ISBN 0-06-492344-4
- The Dynamics of Soviet Society (with others), Norton and Co. 1953, slight update Anchor edition 1954.
- "Trends in the Allocation of Resources in Secular Growth, 1955, in Dupriez, editor, Economic Progress
- An American Policy in Asia, with R.W. Hatch, 1955.
- The Take-Off into Self-Sustained Growth, 1956, EJ
- A Proposal: Key to an effective foreign policy, with Max Millikan, 1957.
- The Stages of Economic Growth, 1959, Econ History Review
- The Stages of Economic Growth: A non-communist manifesto, 1960.
- The United States in the World Arena: An Essay in Recent History (American Project Series), 1960, 568 pages.
- Politics and the Stages of Growth, 1971.
- How it All Began: Origins of the modern economy, 1975.
- The World Economy: History and prospect, 1978.
- Why the Poor Get Richer and the Rich Slow Down: Essays in the Marshallian long period, 1980.
- Eisenhower, Kennedy, and foreign aid, 1985.
- Theorists of Economic Growth from David Hume to the Present, 1990.
- The Great Population Spike and After, 1998

== See also ==
- The Best and the Brightest by David Halberstam
- Hearts and Minds (film)

Political offices
New office	Deputy National Security Advisor; 1961	Succeeded by Carl Kaysen
Preceded by George McGhee	Counselor of the United States Department of State; 1961–1966	Succeeded by Robert Bowie
Preceded by George McGhee	Director of Policy Planning; 1961–1966	Succeeded by Henry Owen
Preceded by Mac Bundy	National Security Advisor; 1966–1969	Succeeded by Henry Kissinger
