= McGhee Center for Eastern Mediterranean Studies =

Academic center operated by Georgetown University

- Formation: 1989
- Type: Academic center
- Location: Alanya, Turkey
- Coordinates: 36°32′1.4″N 31°59′45″E
- Director: Dr. Kay Ebel
- Parent organization: Georgetown University
- Affiliations: Koç University
- Website: mcgheecenter.georgetown.edu

The McGhee Center for Eastern Mediterranean Studies was an overseas academic center operated by Georgetown University, in Alanya, Turkey. The McGhee Center was founded in 1989 after Ambassador George Crews McGhee, former United States Ambassador to Turkey and West Germany, donated his Mediterranean villa to Georgetown University to create a center for the study of the history and culture of Turkey and the Eastern Mediterranean. The McGhee Center was academically affiliated with Koç University and offered three types of programming: semester abroad, the Summer Institute in Intensive Turkish Language, and study tours and short programs. Student programming at the McGhee Center was suspended in Fall 2016.

== The McGhee Villa and Student Residence ==
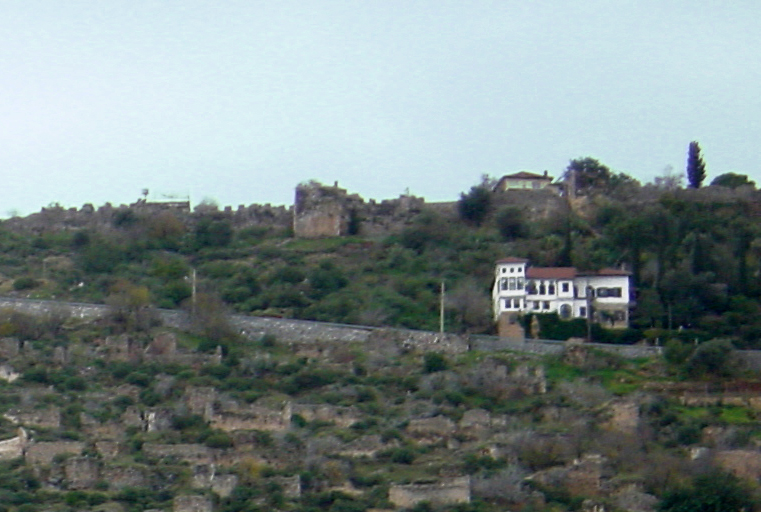
The Villa was built in the 1830s.

The principal facility of the McGhee Center is the 'McGhee Villa', an Ottoman-era mansion located in the historic district of Alanya, within the old walled city overlooking the harbor. The villa was built in the early nineteenth century by a local Orthodox Christian merchant who specialized in the export of timber to Egypt. After World War I and the collapse of the Ottoman Empire, Alanya’s trade routes were severed and its Christian community departed for Greece. The villa, like many of Alanya’s grand old Ottoman homes, fell into disrepair and was gradually abandoned as more and more families came to prefer the comfort and convenience of modern apartment buildings. The villa was noticed by George McGhee and his wife Cecilia on a visit to Alanya during his tenure as U.S. Ambassador to Turkey in the 1950s. McGhee purchased the property in 1968 and renovated it for his family’s use. In 1989, he donated the villa to Georgetown University to be used as a center of learning and scholarship.

The villa housed a library, study areas, kitchen, faculty and staff offices, and space for visiting lecturers. Students at the McGhee Center were lodged in a student residence, an apartment building located halfway between the villa and downtown Alanya.
