= Elspeth Rostow =

American academic (1917-2007)

- Born: Elspeth Vaughan Davies; October 20, 1917; New York, New York, U.S.
- Died: December 10, 2007 (aged 90); Austin, Texas, U.S.
- Education: Barnard College (BA); Radcliffe College (MA); Cambridge University (MA)
- Spouse: Walt Whitman Rostow
- Children: Peter Rostow, Ann Rostow

Elspeth Rostow (born Elspeth Vaughan Davies; October 20, 1917 – December 10, 2007) was Dean of the LBJ School of Public Affairs at the University of Texas at Austin from 1977 to 1983.

== Early life and education ==
Elspeth Vaughan Davies was born October 20, 1917. She graduated from Barnard College in 1938. She received a master's degree in history from Radcliffe College in 1939 and a master's degree from University of Cambridge in 1949.

== World War II ==
While teaching at Barnard in 1939, she was among the founders of American studies as an academic discipline and later authored the book, European Economic Reconstruction (1948). During World War II, she worked for the Office of Strategic Services in Washington, analyzing dispatches from the French Resistance. She had met Walt Whitman Rostow at a Paris seminar in 1937. After their marriage a decade later, the couple lived in Geneva for three years.

== Massachusetts Institute of Technology ==
When she was being considered as MIT's first female tenured professor in the early 1950s, the MIT Faculty Club remained an all-male enclave. When she went to the Provost and asked to be admitted, he denied her request, at which point she retorted, "well then you can just build me my own Faculty Club." The policy was changed that same day.

== University of Texas ==
She brought to the University of Texas impressive academic credentials and internationally recognized expertise in the area of public policy. Among her other presidential appointments, President Ronald Reagan appointed her to the board of the U.S. Institute of Peace, which she later chaired.

Rostow was a force at University of Texas from 1969 until her death. She was initially drawn to Austin, Texas with her husband, Walt, by the research value of Lyndon B. Johnson’s presidential papers. (Walt had served in the Kennedy and Johnson administrations and was writing a book.) She served as dean of both the LBJ School of Public Affairs and University of Texas' Division of General and Comparative Studies.

As dean, she recruited professors such as Barbara Jordan. Despite her administrative ability, she considered herself first to be a teacher, eventually working as a professor for over half a century. She had remarked, "I enjoy the simple act of teaching. It's not transmitting information, it's enticing people into the world of ideas."

== 1990s ==
In 1991, she co-founded The Austin Project, a comprehensive community investment program in children and young people. Her husband once said, "She's extraordinarily concerned with other people. She is an administrator with a green thumb. When she runs something, it flourishes."

In 1996, The Alcalde described Rostow as having "never a hair nor a thread nor a word out of place. She is quietly intense, notoriously elegant, eloquent, proper, and continually self-deprecating."

== Death ==
She died, aged 90, following a heart attack, in 2007, survived by her two children, Ann and Peter, and a granddaughter, Diana Rostow.
