= Max Millikan =

American economist (1913–1969)

- Born: Max Franklin Millikan; December 12, 1913; Chicago, Illinois, U.S.
- Died: December 14, 1969 (aged 56); California, U.S.
- Education: California Institute of Technology, Yale University, Cambridge University, Massachusetts Institute of Technology
- Scientific career
- Fields: Economist

Max Franklin Millikan (December 12, 1913 – December 14, 1969) was an American economist, Professor of Economics at MIT, assistant director of the Office of Research and Reports at the CIA, and director of the MIT Center for International Studies.

== Biography ==
Millikan was born and raised in Chicago, Illinois. He was a son of the physicist Robert Millikan. He started his studies at the California Institute of Technology from 1931 to 1933, and then moved to Yale University, where he obtained his BS in physics in 1935. In the year 1935–36, he was student at Cambridge University. Back at Yale in 1941, he obtained his PhD in economics.

In 1938, Millikan had started his academic career as instructor in economics at Yale University. In 1941, he was appointed assistant professor, and in 1942 Research Associate. In 1942, he joined the US Office of Price Administration as Senior Business Specialist, and the War Shipping Administration as Principal Economist, where he was assistant director of the Division of Ship Requirements from 1944 to 1946. In 1946, he joined the United States Department of State as Chief Economist in the Intelligence Bureau Division, Research for Europe. In 1947, he served in the President's Commission on Foreign Aid as Assistant Executive Secretary, and was consultant to the United States House of Representatives.

In 1949, he returned to the academic world to the Massachusetts Institute of Technology (M.I.T.), where he was appointed associate professor. In the year 1951–52, he took a year leave to serve as assistant director of the Central Intelligence Agency. Upon his he return at MIT, he was appointed Professor of Economics, where he served until his death in 1969. From 1952 to 1969, he was also Director of the MIT Center for International Studies, from 1956 to 1969 he was President of the World Peace Foundation.

== Work ==
=== US foreign aid for development ===
In 1954, Millikan and Walt Whitman Rostow made important recommendations to President Dwight Eisenhower regarding US foreign aid for development. In the beginning of that year Rostow had started advising President Dwight Eisenhower on economic and foreign policy, and in 1958 would become a speechwriter for him. In August 1954, Rostow and Millikan convinced Eisenhower to massively increase US foreign aid for development as part of a policy of spreading American-style capitalist economic growth in Asia and elsewhere, backed by the military.

=== Peace Corps ===
In 1960, Millikan had also advised President John F. Kennedy on the foundation of the Peace Corps. Kennedy was the first to announce the idea for such an organization during the 1960 presidential campaign, at a late-night speech at the University of Michigan in Ann Arbor, October 14, 1960, on the steps of the Michigan Union. He later dubbed the proposed organization the "Peace Corps". A brass marker commemorates the place where Kennedy stood. In the weeks after the 1960 election, the study group at Colorado State University, released their feasibility a few days before Kennedy's Presidential Inauguration in January 1961.

Critics opposed the program. Kennedy's opponent, Richard M. Nixon, predicted it would become a "cult of escapism" and "a haven for draft dodgers".

Others doubted whether recent graduates had the necessary skills and maturity for such a task. The idea was popular among students, however, and Kennedy pursued it, asking respected academics such as Millikan and Chester Bowles to help him outline the organization and its goals.

=== Developmentalism ===
In the 1960s, Millikan made some contribution the emerging theory of developmentalism, the attempts to codify the ways in which development is discussed on an international level. Through developmentalism, it is thought by its advocates that discussions about the economic development of the 'Third World' can be redesigned in such a way that everyone will use the same vocabulary to discuss the various phenomena of development.

This way, societies can be discussed comparatively without the impediments associated with placing developmental disparities across nations in completely different categories of speech and thought. This increased uniformity of language would increase understanding and appreciation for the studies about development from different fields in the social sciences and allow freer and more productive communication about these studies.

Before its decline in the 1970s, scholars had been optimistic that developmentalism could break down the barriers between the disciplines of social sciences when discussing the complexities of development. This school of thought produced such works as Talcott Parsons and Edward Shils's Toward A General Theory of Action; Clifford Geertz's Old Societies and New States; and Donald L.M. Blackmer and Millikan's The Emerging Nations.

=== National economic planning, 1967 ===
In the introduction to the 1967 publication, entitled National Economic Planning, edited by Millikan, he gave a perspective on the conception on national economic planning in the first part of the 20th century. He explained:

Fashions among economists are almost as fickle as among dress designers. It would have been inconceivable for a conference volume with this title [National Economic Planning] to have appeared thirty-five years ago. Twenty-five years ago it would have been assumed that it was a volume about economic policy in the Soviet Union, which was the only country then regarded as having a "planned economy." Fifteen years ago the assumption would have been that it was a book about the planned development of the so-called underdeveloped countries, where the idea of national economic planning was beginning to gain wide popularity as a necessary and even sometimes sufficient condition for economic growth. Within the last ten years the term has become so popular and has been applied to so many different kinds of activities that it could now refer to almost any kind of economic analysis or policy thinking in almost any country in the world. Whereas before World War II the term economic planning frequently carried, for many people in both professional and popular discourse, unfavorable connotations of centralization and autocratic control ...

According to Millikan in those days national Economic Planning as by then "widely regarded as a good thing which should be practiced in one form or another by all governments."

== Selected publications ==
- Rostow, Walt Whitman, Alfred Levin, and Max F. Millikan. The dynamics of Soviet society. Vol. 1. New American Library, 1954.
- Millikan, Max F., and Walt Whitman Rostow. A proposal: Key to an effective foreign policy. Harper & Bros., 1957.
- Millikan, Max F., and Donald LM Blackmer. The emerging nations: their growth and United States policy. Boston: Little, Brown (1961).
- Malenbaum, Wilfred, and Max F. Millikan. Prospects for Indian development. Allen & Unwin, 1962.
- Millikan, Max F. (ed.). National economic planning: a conference of the Universities-National Bureau Committee for Economic Research. National Bureau of Economic Research, 1967.

Article (selection)

- Millikan, Max F. "Introduction to" National Economic Planning". National Economic Planning. NBER, 1967. 3–11.
- Gardner, Richard N., and Max F. Millikan. "The global partnership. International agencies and economic development". The global partnership. International agencies and economic development. (1968).
