= George C. McGhee =

American diplomat

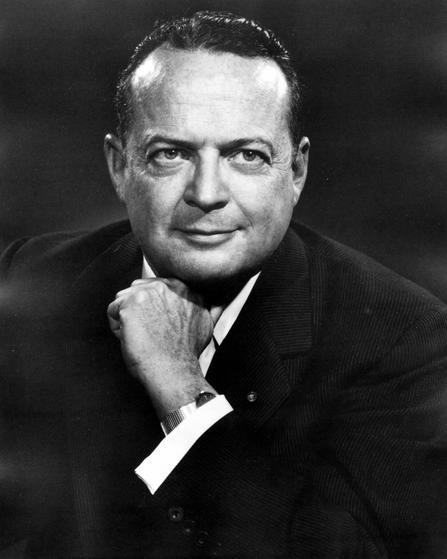

13th Counselor of the United States Department of State
- In office February 16, 1961 – December 3, 1961
- President: John F. Kennedy
- Preceded by: Theodore Achilles
- Succeeded by: Walt Whitman Rostow

5th Director of Policy Planning
- In office February 13, 1961 – November 29, 1961
- President: John F. Kennedy
- Preceded by: Gerard C. Smith
- Succeeded by: Walt Whitman Rostow

3rd Under Secretary of State for Political Affairs
- In office December 4, 1961 – March 27, 1963
- President: John F. Kennedy
- Preceded by: Livingston T. Merchant
- Succeeded by: W. Averell Harriman

1st Assistant Secretary of State for Near Eastern, South Asian, and African Affairs
- In office June 28, 1949 – December 19, 1951
- President: Harry S. Truman
- Preceded by: Position established
- Succeeded by: Henry A. Byroade

8th United States Ambassador to Turkey
- In office January 15, 1952 – June 19, 1953
- President: Harry S. Truman; Dwight D. Eisenhower
- Preceded by: George Wadsworth
- Succeeded by: Avra M. Warren

4th United States Ambassador to West Germany
- In office May 18, 1963 – May 21, 1968
- President: John F. Kennedy; Lyndon B. Johnson
- Preceded by: Walter C. Dowling
- Succeeded by: Henry Cabot Lodge Jr.

Personal details
- Born: March 10, 1912 Waco, Texas, U.S.
- Died: July 4, 2005 (aged 93) Leesburg, Virginia, U.S.
- Spouse: Cecelia DeGolyer
- Profession: Oilman, Diplomat

George Crews McGhee (March 10, 1912 – July 4, 2005) was an American oilman and a career diplomat in the United States foreign service.

== Early life ==
McGhee was born on March 10, 1912, in Waco, Texas, the son of a Waco banker. He studied at the University of Oklahoma, graduating with a degree in geology in 1933. He was initiated into the Oklahoma Kappa chapter of Sigma Alpha Epsilon fraternity at OU. For a time McGhee worked for Conoco, on a crew that made the first oil discovery on the Gulf Coast using reflection seismology. He was awarded a Rhodes scholarship, and earned a doctorate in physical sciences from Oxford University in 1937. Back in the United States he became vice president of the National Geophysical Company, where he managed reflection seismology surveys in Cuba. On his return to Texas, McGhee found employment with Everette Lee DeGolyer's oil services company DeGolyer and MacNaughton, scouting oilfields and marrying DeGolyer's daughter Cecilia. McGhee described Cecilia as "the most beautiful and richest girl in Texas." In 1940 McGhee established his own company, the McGhee Production Company, and soon discovered a major oil field at Lake Charles, Louisiana, which made his fortune.

== Wartime service ==
At the beginning of World War II McGhee was a member of the staff of the Office of Production Management and a member of the War Production Board. Commissioned into the U.S. Navy, McGhee served as a naval air intelligence officer on the staff of Army Air Force General Curtis E. LeMay, for which he was awarded the Legion of Merit.

== Diplomatic career ==
Following the war he was recruited to the U.S. State Department by then-Undersecretary of State William L. Clayton, joining in 1946. McGhee initially traveled on behalf of the State Department to disburse a fund of $400 million in economic and military aid to Greece and Turkey, as well as other economic aid in Africa and the Middle East. He served as U.S. Ambassador to Turkey in 1952–1953, where he supported their successful bid for NATO membership. While in Turkey, the McGhees lived in Alanya in an Ottoman-era villa they named "Turkish Delight."

McGhee was instrumental in dealings with the Republic of the Congo and the Dominican Republic in the early 1960s. From November 1961 to April 1963, he served as the third ever Under Secretary of State for Political Affairs, during the Kennedy Administration (later to be replaced by W. Averell Harriman). President Kennedy had left this office vacant since January 1961 until McGhee was persuaded to take the position. Following that position, he was again named Ambassador to West Germany from 1963 to 1968.

== Retirement ==
After retiring in 1969, McGhee served on corporate boards of Mobil, Procter and Gamble and Trans World Airlines.

From 1970 to 1974, McGhee was head of the Federal City Council, a group of business, civic, education, and other leaders interested in economic development in Washington, D.C.

McGhee was elected to the American Philosophical Society in 1993.

In retirement McGhee wrote a semi-autobiographical novel, entitled The Dance of the Billions: A Novel About Texas, Houston, and Oil (1990), whose lack of success was attributed by his family to its puritanical tone. His 2001 memoir was entitled I Did It This Way.

In 1989, McGhee donated his villa in Alanya, Turkey to Georgetown University. It was known as the McGhee Center for Eastern Mediterranean Studies, and welcomed students each spring. His estate, Farmer's Delight in Loudoun County, Virginia, is operated by the McGhee Foundation as a museum, research center and meeting facility. It is listed on the National Register of Historic Places.

McGhee died of pneumonia on July 4, 2005, at the age of 93 at Loudoun Hospital Center in Leesburg, Virginia.

Government offices
Preceded by New office	Assistant Secretary of State for Near Eastern, South Asian, and African Affairs; June 28, 1949 – December 19, 1951	Succeeded by Henry A. Byroade
Preceded by Gerard C. Smith	Director of Policy Planning; 1961 – November 1961	Succeeded by Walt Whitman Rostow
Preceded by Livingston T. Merchant	Under Secretary of State for Political Affairs; November 1961 – April 1963	Succeeded by W. Averell Harriman
Diplomatic posts
Preceded by George Wadsworth	U.S. Ambassador to Turkey; 1952–1953	Succeeded by Avra M. Warren
Preceded by Walter C. Dowling	U.S. Ambassador to West Germany; 1963–1968	Succeeded by Henry Cabot Lodge Jr.
