= Leithtown, Virginia =

Unincorporated community in Virginia, United States

- Unincorporated village
- Location within Northern Virginia Location within Virginia Location within the United States
- Coordinates: 39°0′48″N 77°45′32″W
- Country: United States
- State: Virginia
- County: Loudoun
- Time zone: UTC−5 (Eastern (EST))
  - Summer (DST): UTC−4 (EDT)

Leithtown is an unincorporated village in Loudoun County, Virginia, United States. Leithtown lies to the west of Goose Creek at the crossroads of Foxcroft, Pot House, and Mountville roads. It is the home of the Foxcroft School and saw cavalry action in the Battle of Middleburg and Battle of Upperville in 1863.
