= Matthew Brzezinski =

American writer and journalist

- Born: October 7, 1965 (age 60); Canada
- Occupations: Writer, journalist
- Relatives: Zbigniew Brzezinski (uncle); Ian Brzezinski (cousin); Mark Brzezinski (cousin); Mika Brzezinski (cousin)

Matthew Brzezinski (born October 7, 1965) is an American writer and journalist.

== Biography ==
Brzezinski was born in Canada and is of Polish heritage. He graduated from McGill University in 1991. Brzezinski began working as a journalist in the early 1990s in Warsaw, writing for publications including The New York Times, The Economist, and The Guardian (UK). He was a Wall Street Journal staff reporter in Moscow and Kyiv in the late 1990s. Relocating to the US, he became a contributing writer for The New York Times Magazine, covering counterterrorism in the aftermath of 9/11. His work has also appeared in many other publications including The Washington Post Magazine, the Los Angeles Times, and Mother Jones.

Brzezinski is the nephew of former National Security Adviser Zbigniew Brzezinski and his wife Emilie Anna Benešová. Brzezinski is the cousin of television anchor Mika Brzezinski, military affairs expert Ian Joseph Brzezinski and U.S. Ambassador to Poland Mark Brzezinski.

Brzezinski lives in Manchester-by-the-sea, Massachusetts with his three children.

Brzezinski is the author of four non-fiction books. His first book, Casino Moscow (Free Press, 2001) is a first-person account of the "Wild East" atmosphere prevailing in Russia in the 1990s. His second book, Fortress America (Bantam, 2004) addresses the new technology, laws, tactics, and persistent vulnerabilities of the post-9/11 era. Brzezinski's third book, Red Moon Rising (Holt, 2007) is a work of narrative nonfiction that tells the story of the race to space culminating in the Sputnik launch by the USSR on October 4, 1957, drawing on previously classified Soviet documents. Red Moon Rising is now in development to become a miniseries. Brzezinski's fourth book, Isaac's Army (Random House, 2012) is set in World War II. A work of narrative nonfiction, Isaac's Army tells the story of a group of young Polish Jews and the Polish Jewish underground, from its earliest acts of defiance in 1939 to the survivors' exodus to Palestine in 1946. The book draws on interviews with surviving Resistance members and unpublished memoirs, as well as Polish-language sources and established academic works on the subject of the Warsaw Ghetto Uprising. "Isaac's Army" was named as a 2012 finalist for the National Jewish Book Awards.
