= Mika Brzezinski =

American television host (born 1967)

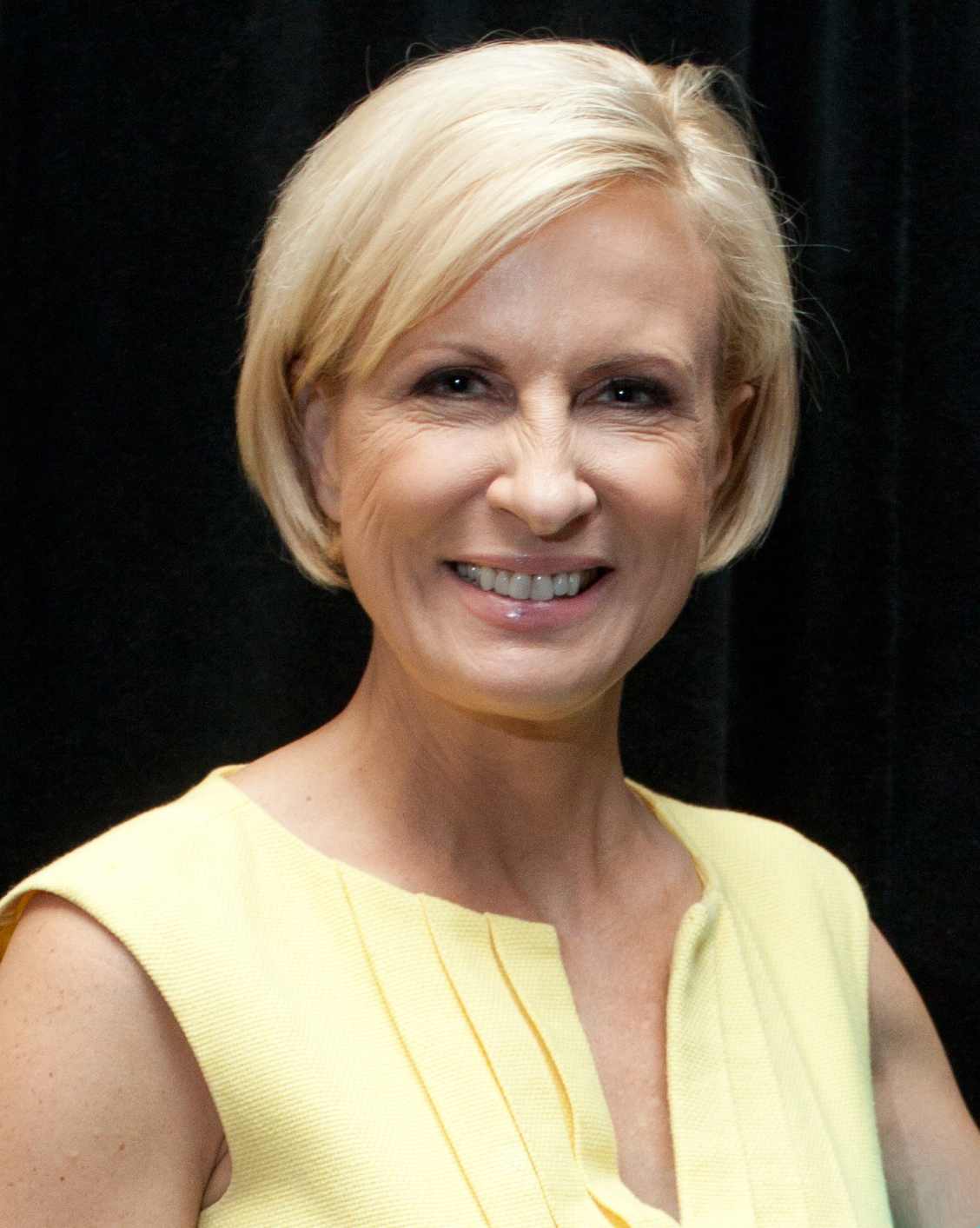
- Brzezinski in 2011
- Born: Mika Emilie Leonia Brzezinski; May 2, 1967 (age 59); New York City, U.S.
- Education: Williams College (BA)
- Occupations: Television host, author
- Employer: Versant
- Television: Morning Joe (co-host)
- Political party: Democratic
- Spouses: James Hoffer (m. 1993; div. 2016); Joe Scarborough (m. 2018)
- Children: 2
- Parent(s): Zbigniew Brzezinski (father); Emilie Benešová (mother)
- Relatives: Ian Brzezinski (brother); Mark Brzezinski (brother); Matthew Brzezinski (cousin)

Mika Emilie Leonia Brzezinski Scarborough (/ˈmiːkə brəˈzɪnski/; née Brzezinski; born May 2, 1967) is an American talk show host who co-hosts MS NOW's weekday morning broadcast show Morning Joe alongside her husband Joe Scarborough. She was formerly a CBS News correspondent, and was their principal "Ground Zero" reporter during the morning of the September 11 attacks. In 2007, she joined MSNBC as an occasional anchor, and was subsequently chosen as co-host of Morning Joe.

Brzezinski is the daughter of diplomat and political scientist Zbigniew Brzezinski, who served as a counselor to President Lyndon B. Johnson and as the National Security Advisor to President Jimmy Carter. Brzezinski is a visiting fellow at the Harvard Institute of Politics. Her main political interest is in wage equality for women. She is the author of six books.

== Early life ==
Brzezinski was born in New York City on May 2, 1967, the daughter of Polish-born foreign policy expert and former National Security Advisor Zbigniew Brzeziński and Swiss-born sculptor Emilie Anna Benešová. Her mother, of Czech descent, is a grandniece of Czechoslovakia's former president Edvard Beneš. Her father was teaching at Columbia University when she was born. The family moved to McLean, Virginia, near Washington, D.C., in late 1976, when Zbigniew was named National Security Advisor by newly elected President Jimmy Carter. Her brother, Mark Brzezinski, an American diplomat, was the United States Ambassador to Sweden from 2011 to 2015 and from 2022 to 2025, the United States Ambassador to Poland. Her second brother is military expert Ian Brzezinski. She is a first cousin of the author Matthew Brzezinski.

Brzezinski attended the Madeira School and then attended Georgetown University for two years before transferring to Williams College, where she graduated with a Bachelor of Arts degree in English in 1989.

== Career ==
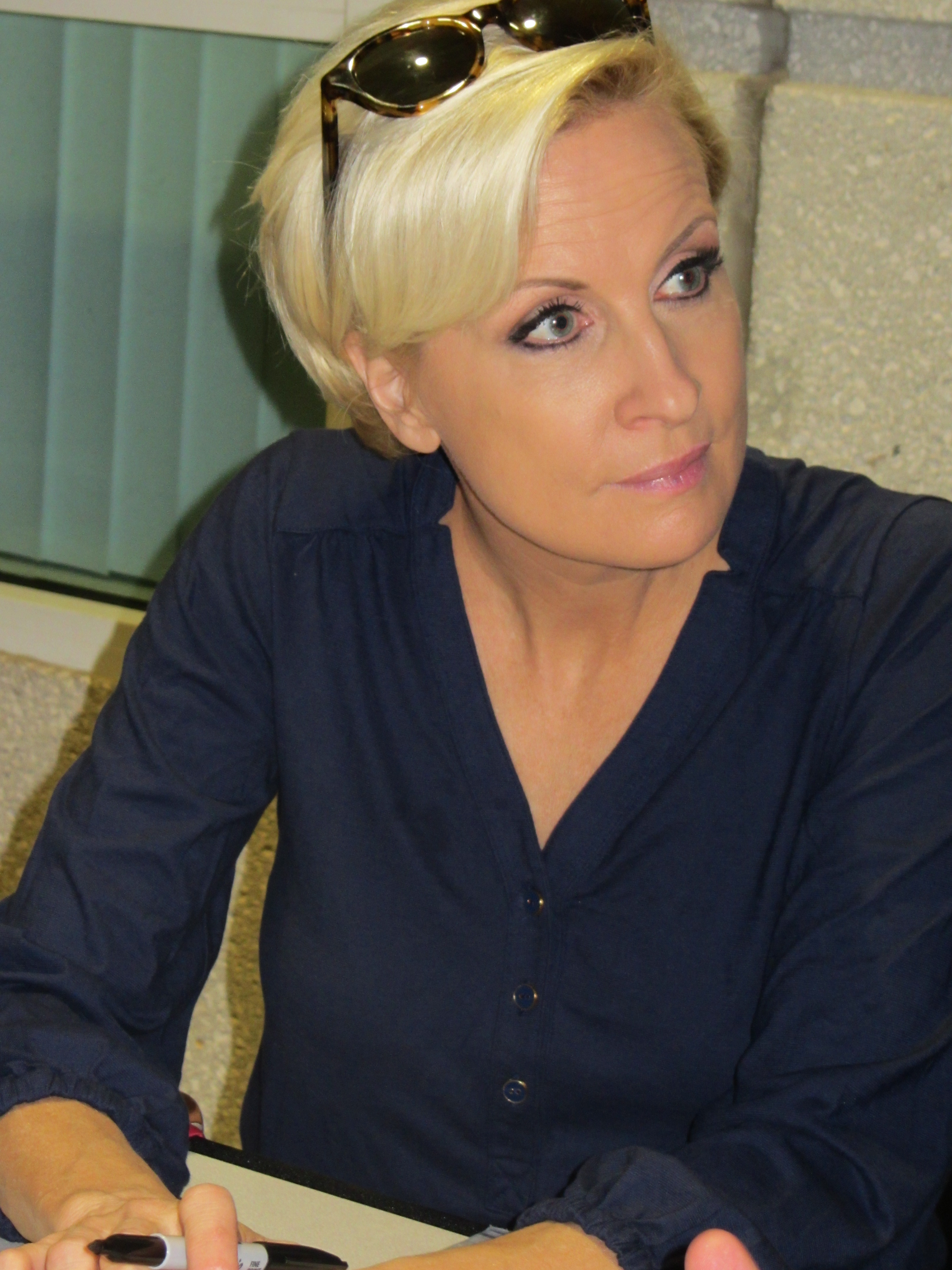
Brzezinski at the Miami Book Fair International 2013

Brzezinski began her career in journalism as an assistant at ABC's World News This Morning in 1990. A year later, she moved to Tribune-owned Fox affiliate WTIC-TV/WTIC-DT in Hartford, Connecticut. There, she progressed from assignment and features editor to general assignments reporter. In 1992, she joined CBS affiliate WFSB-TV/WFSB-DT in Hartford and quickly progressed through the ranks to become its weekday morning anchor in 1995. In 1997, she left that role to join CBS News, where she served as a correspondent and as anchor for the overnight Up to the Minute news program. In 2001, Brzezinski began a short hiatus from CBS News, during which she worked for rival MSNBC on the weekday afternoon show, HomePage, with co-anchors Gina Gaston and Ashleigh Banfield. Entertainment Weekly described the trio as "the Powerpuff Girls of journalism".

=== 9/11 correspondent ===
She returned to CBS News as a desk correspondent in September 2001, a move that thrust her into the limelight as a principal "Ground Zero" reporter for the September 11, 2001, attacks. Brzezinski was broadcasting live from the scene when the South Tower collapsed. In her last position at CBS News, Brzezinski served as a CBS News correspondent, substitute anchor, and segment anchor for breaking news segments and routine updates. During this period she became an occasional contributor to CBS Sunday Morning and 60 Minutes.

=== MSNBC ===
Brzezinski returned to MSNBC on January 26, 2007, doing the evening "Up to the Minute" news updates. Then she worked primetime newsbreaks during the week. She also filed occasional reports for NBC Nightly News and appeared as an occasional anchor on Weekend Today. Brzezinski resigned from both shows on the eve of a renewal option, said Brzezinski, when Scarborough selected her to co-host on Morning Joe.

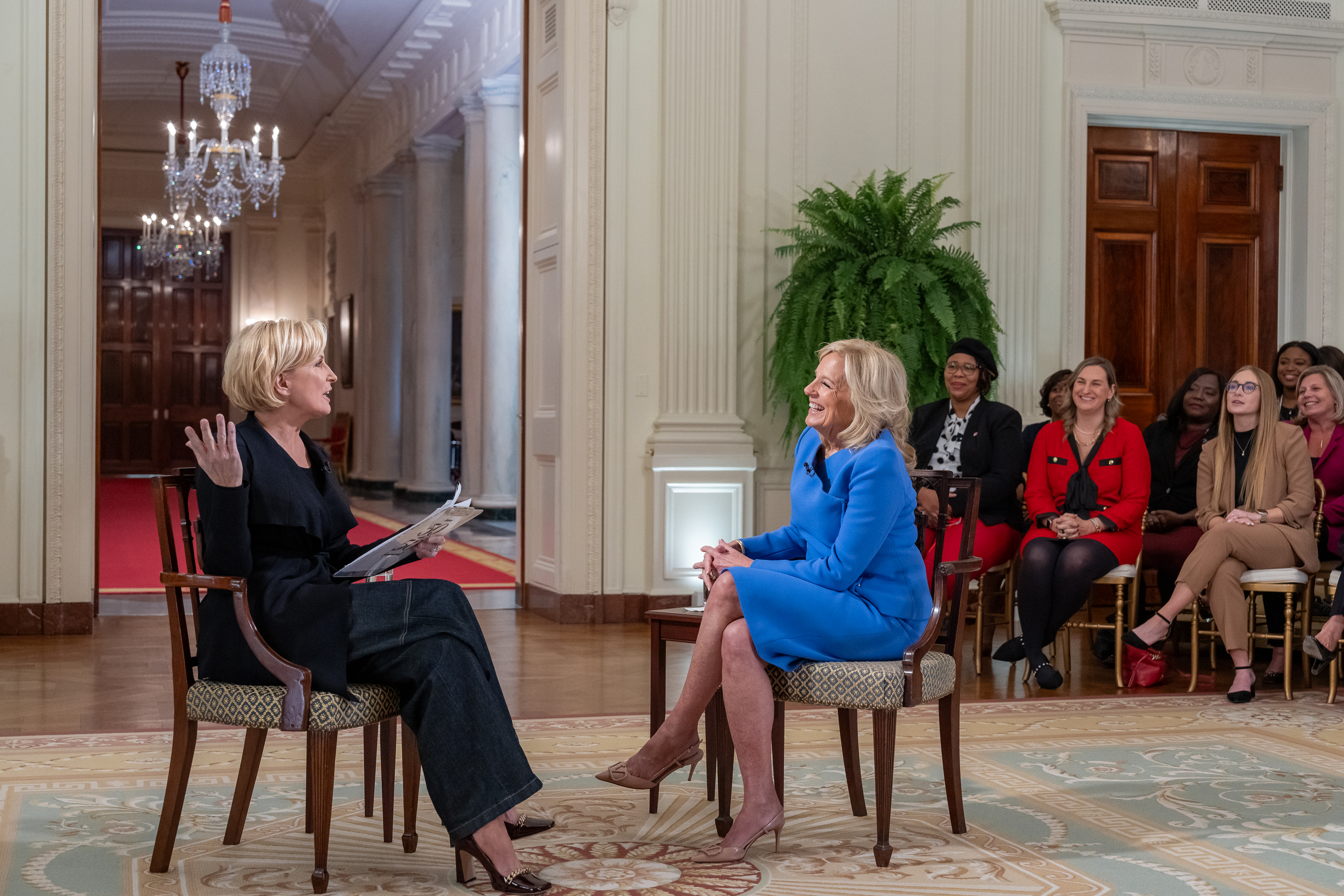
Brzezinski interviewing Jill Biden at the White House in January 2024

Since the program's inception, Brzezinski appeared as co-host and news reader on MSNBC's morning program Morning Joe, alongside Joe Scarborough and Willie Geist.

In December 2017, Brzezinski complained on her show that women who had accused her friend and former colleague Mark Halperin of sexual harassment would not meet with him so he could apologize. Ten of Halperin's accusers released a statement criticizing Brzezinski's comments.

On December 12, 2018, Brzezinski called Trump's Secretary of State Mike Pompeo "a wannabe dictator's butt-boy", referring to Saudi Crown Prince Mohammed bin Salman, during a live MSNBC broadcast. She apologized later that day and also the next day after her remarks were criticized as homophobic.

=== Campaign against trivial journalism ===
On June 26, 2007, near the beginning of Morning Joe, Brzezinski refused to read a report about Paris Hilton's release from jail. One hour later during another news break segment, her producer Andy Jones again pushed the story as the lead, ranking it over Indiana's Republican Senator Richard Lugar's break with President Bush on the Iraq War, which Brzezinski considered more important. After several sarcastic remarks from host Scarborough, she attempted to set the story's script on fire on the air, but was physically prevented from doing so by co-host Geist. She then tore up the script, and one hour later, got up and ran another copy of the script through a paper shredder retrieved from Dan Abrams's office. The incident was quickly popularized on the Internet, and in the days that followed, Brzezinski received large quantities of fan mail supporting her on-air protest as a commentary on the tension between "hard news" and "entertainment news". Similarly, on July 7, 2010, she objected on-air to pressure to report on Lindsay Lohan and Levi Johnston. Eventually, Geist and Pat Buchanan reported the stories with the caption, then popularized, "News You Can't Use".

Erik Wemple of The Washington Post criticized Brzezinski and co-host Scarborough for frequent phone interviews with Donald Trump during the 2016 Presidential campaign.

=== Democratic National Committee email leak ===
The 2016 Democratic National Committee email leak revealed that Debbie Wasserman Schultz, chairperson of the Democratic National Committee, had emailed Chuck Todd, the Political Director of NBC News and host of Meet the Press, to demand that he "stop" Brzezinski from criticizing the DNC's treatment of Bernie Sanders. In December 2016, after Clinton had lost, Brzezinski suggested the Clinton campaign had tried to silence her by calling executives at NBC and telling them she "needed to be pulled off the air".

=== Refusal of Kellyanne Conway interviews ===
On February 15, 2017, Brzezinski banned Trump spokesperson Kellyanne Conway from future appearances on her show. Brzezinski said, "We know for a fact that [Conway] tries to book herself on this show. I won't do it. Because I don't believe in fake news, or information that is not true... every time I've ever seen her on television, something's askew, off or incorrect". Her co-host Joe Scarborough said the decision to ban Conway from future appearances was based on her being "out of the loop" and "in none of the key meetings". "She's not briefed. She's just saying things just to get in front of the TV to prove her relevance".

On February 15, 2017, Washington Post columnist Jennifer Rubin agreed that Conway should be banned from future television appearances. "In recent days, George Stephanopoulos and Matt Lauer blasted her directly, essentially calling her a fabulist. Given all that, it would be irresponsible for any news show to put her out there, suggesting she really does not know what is going on at any given moment", Rubin wrote. According to both Scarborough and Brzezinski, Conway is privately "disgusted" by her job and Donald Trump, and her words do not reflect her actual beliefs—though Conway disputed the claim.

=== Conflict with Donald Trump ===
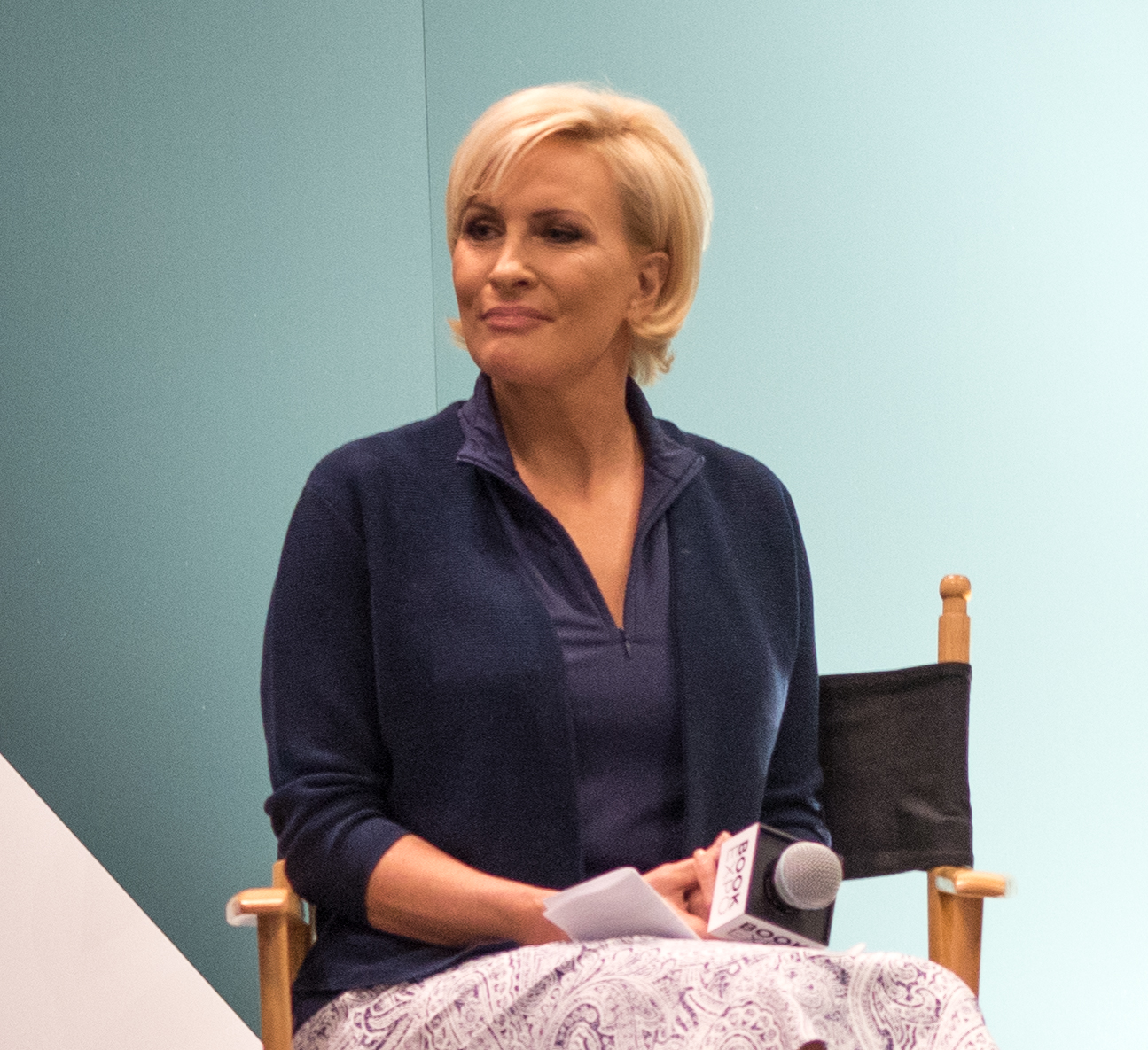
Brzezinski being interviewed at BookExpo America in 2018

During the 2016 presidential campaign, then-presidential candidate Donald Trump tweeted several times criticizing both Brzezinski and Scarborough. In March 2017, Brzezinski called Trump's presidency "fake and failed", and soon thereafter Trump unfollowed Brzezinski and Scarborough on Twitter.

In late June 2017, Brzezinski was again the target of Trump's tweets in which he called her "low I.Q. Crazy Mika" and asserted that she was "bleeding badly from a face-lift".

Brzezinski and Scarborough then accused the White House of threatening to blackmail them with an exposé in a tabloid magazine unless the pair apologized publicly to the President.

On May 20, 2020, while hosting Morning Joe, Brzezinski spoke out against Trump for tweeting a conspiracy theory that her husband was involved in the death of Lori Klausutis, an intern in Scarborough's Florida office in 2001, while he was in Congress. Trump labelled Klausutis' death a "cold case" in his tweet. Klausutis was found dead at her desk in July 2001. An autopsy revealed an undiagnosed heart problem that caused her to lose consciousness and hit her head when she fell. During a live segment on Morning Joe, Brzezinski stated "Donald, you're a sick person. You're a sick person, to put this [Klausutis'] family through this, to put her husband through this, to do this just because you're mad at Joe, because Joe got you again today. Because he speaks the truth, and he speaks plainly about your lack of interest and empathy in others and your lack of ability to handle this massive human catastrophe (COVID-19), the fact that you have made it worse and you make it worse every day. And that you won't even wear a mask to protect people from your germs". Brzezinski later announced in a tweet that she would be contacting Twitter about Trump's tweet, which she said violated their policies, and urged the platform to stop allowing their policies "to be abused by the day", citing Trump's tweet as libel, and further announced a call with the company was being arranged.

On May 26, 2020, The New York Times published an op-ed, containing a letter in which the widower of Lori Klausutis, Timothy Klausutis demanded Trump stop exploiting his late wife and urged Twitter to take down the tweets. Klausutis wrote to Twitter CEO Jack Dorsey asking him to intervene and claimed Trump has violated Twitter's terms of service and "has taken something that does not belong to him-the memory of my dead wife-and perverted it for perceived political gain". Later, the same day, Trump posted two tweets seemingly addressing the letter, writing: "The opening of a Cold Case against Psycho Joe Scarborough was not a Donald Trump original thought, this has been going on for years, long before I joined the chorus. In 2016 when Joe & his wacky future ex-wife, Mika, would endlessly interview me, I would always be thinking .... about whether or not Joe could have done such a horrible thing? [...]".

In November 2024, following the 2024 United States presidential election, Brzezinski and Scarborough met with Trump at Mar-a-Lago.

== Personal life ==
On October 23, 1993, Brzezinski married TV news reporter James Patrick Hoffer, now of WABC-TV. They met when both worked at WTIC-TV. They have two daughters. Hoffer and Brzezinski divorced in 2016.

In early 2017, Brzezinski became engaged to her co-host Joe Scarborough, and they were married on November 24, 2018, in Washington, D.C., with Rep. Elijah Cummings serving as the officiant. The couple spends their summers at Brzezinski's family home in Northeast Harbor, Maine.

== Awards and honors ==
Brzezinski was selected for the inaugural 2021 Forbes 50 Over 50; made up of entrepreneurs, leaders, scientists and creators who are over the age of 50.

In August 2022, Brzezinski was awarded an honorary doctorate by SWPS University.

== Works ==
In January 2010, Brzezinski published a memoir entitled All Things at Once. According to The New York Times, the book "follows Brzezinski through her professional chutes and ladders — the freelance gigs, the graveyard shifts, the drama (covering 9/11), the dreariness (puff segments on shoes) — the only constant being the precariousness of her employment". The News-Times says that Brzezinski uses "the roller-coaster model of her own career to advise people" who have become unemployed, which she sees as a "reset" that can be "cleansing and liberating in ways you never knew." Her inspiration for the book came in part from talking to young women who did not believe they could have kids before establishing a career.

Knowing Your Value: Women, Money and Getting What You're Worth, published in 2011, discusses women and financial negotiations. It includes tips for negotiating salaries and compensation packages. In 2018 this was revised, updated, and was released as Know Your Value. Her third book, Obsessed: America's Food Addiction and My Own, was published in 2012. In 2021, Forbes partnered with Brzezinski and her "Know Your Value" initiative, to shine a light on 50 diverse women over the age of 50 who have achieved significant success later in life, often by overcoming formidable odds or barriers.

== See also ==
- Cable news in the United States
- New Yorkers in journalism

Media offices
Preceded by Nanette Hansen	Anchor of Up to the Minute; 1998–2000	Succeeded by Melissa McDermott
New title	Co-host of Morning Joe; 2007–present Served alongside: John Ridley, Willie Geist, Joe Scarborough	Incumbent
