= Zbigniew Brzezinski =

Polish-American diplomat and political scientist (1928–2017)

Zbigniew Brzeziński
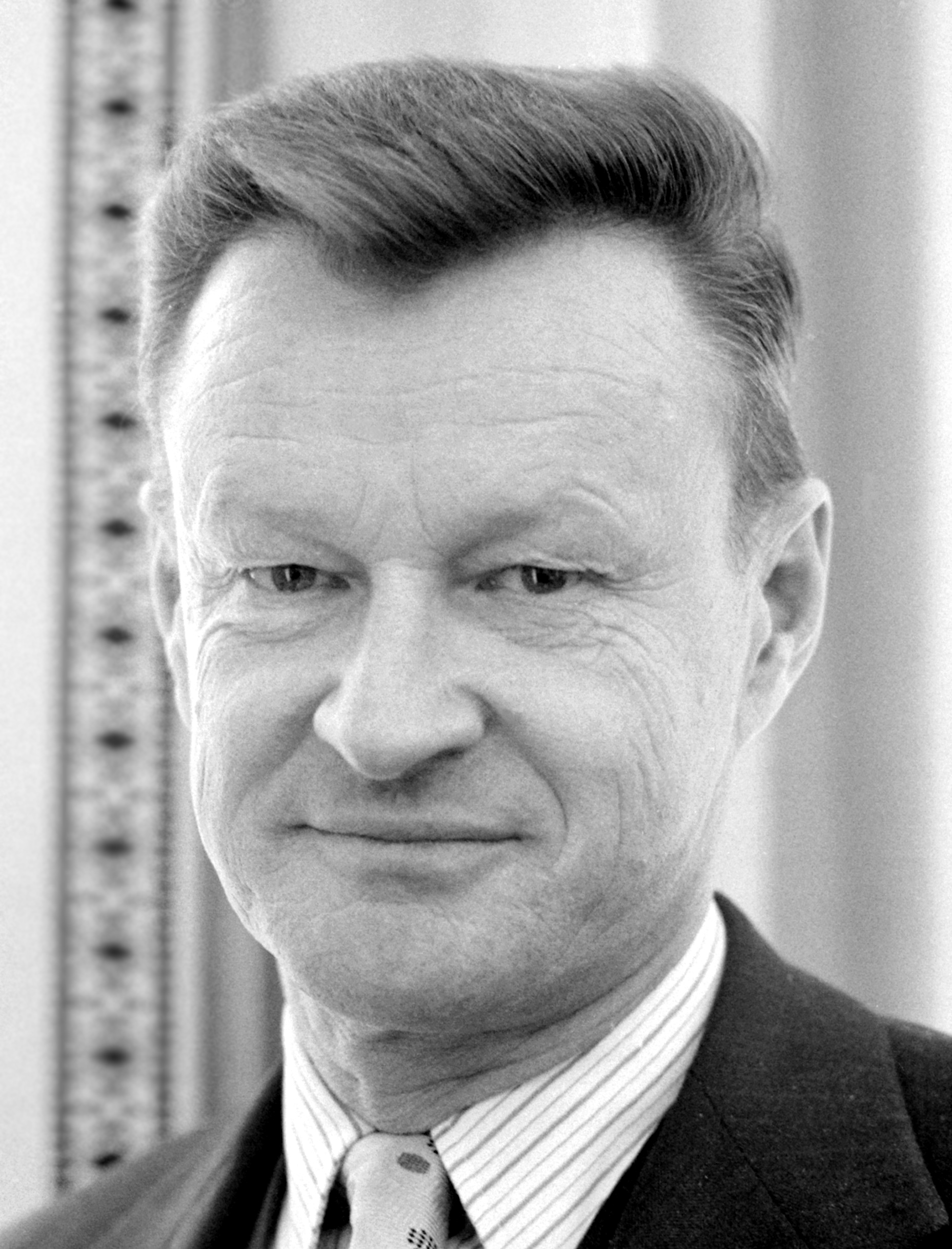
- Official portrait, 1977

9th United States National Security Advisor
- In office January 20, 1977 – January 20, 1981
- President: Jimmy Carter
- Deputy: David L. Aaron
- Preceded by: Brent Scowcroft
- Succeeded by: Richard V. Allen

Personal details
- Born: Zbigniew Kazimierz Brzeziński; March 28, 1928 Warsaw, Poland
- Died: May 26, 2017 (aged 89) Falls Church, Virginia, U.S.
- Party: Democratic
- Spouse: Emilie Benešová (m. 1961)
- Children: Ian; Mark; Mika
- Parent: Tadeusz Brzeziński (father)
- Relatives: Matthew Brzeziński (nephew)
- Education: McGill University (BA, MA); Harvard University (PhD)

Zbigniew Kazimierz "Zbig" Brzeziński (Note: /ˈzbɪɡnjɛf brəˈzɪnski/, Polish: [ˈzbiɡɲɛf kaˈʑimjɛʐ‿bʐɛˈʑij̃skʲi]) (March 28, 1928 – May 26, 2017) was a Polish-American diplomat and political scientist. He served as a counselor to Lyndon B. Johnson from 1966 to 1968 and was Jimmy Carter's National Security Advisor from 1977 to 1981. As a scholar, Brzeziński belonged to the realist school of international relations, standing in the geopolitical tradition of Halford Mackinder and Nicholas J. Spykman, while elements of liberal idealism have also been identified in his outlook. Brzeziński was the primary organizer of the Trilateral Commission.

Major foreign policy events during his time in office included the normalization of relations with the People's Republic of China (and the severing of ties with the Republic of China on Taiwan); the signing of the second Strategic Arms Limitation Treaty (SALT II) with the Soviet Union; the brokering of the Camp David Accords between Egypt and Israel; the overthrow of the US-friendly Mohammad Reza Pahlavi and the start of the Iranian Revolution; the United States' encouragement of dissidents in Eastern Europe and championing of human rights in order to undermine the influence of the Soviet Union; supporting the Afghan mujahideen against the Soviet-backed Democratic Republic of Afghanistan and, ultimately, Soviet troops during the Soviet–Afghan War; and the signing of the Torrijos–Carter Treaties relinquishing U.S. control of the Panama Canal after 1999.

Zbigniew Brzeziński's personal views have been described as "progressive", "international," politically liberal, and strongly anti-communist. He was an advocate for anti-Soviet containment, for human rights organizations, and for "cultivating a strong West." He has been praised for his ability to see "the big picture." Critics described him as hawkish or a "foreign policy hardliner" on some issues, such as Poland–Russia relations.

Zbigniew Brzeziński served as the Robert E. Osgood Professor of American Foreign Policy at Johns Hopkins University's School of Advanced International Studies, a scholar at the Center for Strategic and International Studies, and a member of various boards and councils. He frequently appeared as an expert on the PBS program The NewsHour with Jim Lehrer, ABC News' This Week with Christiane Amanpour, and MSNBC's Morning Joe, where his daughter, Mika Brzeziński, is co-anchor. He supported the Prague Process. His elder son, Ian, is a foreign policy expert, and his younger son, Mark, was the United States Ambassador to Poland from 2022 to 2025 and the United States Ambassador to Sweden from 2011 to 2015.

== Early years ==
Zbigniew Brzeziński was born in Warsaw, Poland, on March 28, 1928 into a Roman Catholic szlachta family bearing the Trąby coat of arms, originally from Brzeżany, Tarnopol Voivodeship (then part of Poland, currently in Ukraine). The town of Brzeżany is thought to be the source of the family name. Brzeziński's parents were Leonia (née Roman) Brzeziński and Tadeusz Brzeziński, a Polish diplomat who was posted to Germany from 1931 to 1935; Zbigniew Brzeziński thus spent some of his earliest years witnessing the rise of the Nazis. From 1936 to 1938, Tadeusz Brzeziński was posted to the Soviet Union during Joseph Stalin's Great Purge, and was later praised by Israel for his work helping Jews escape from the Nazis.

In 1938, Tadeusz Brzeziński was posted to Montreal as a consul general. The Brzeziński family lived near the Polish Consulate-General, on Stanley Street. In 1939, the Molotov–Ribbentrop Pact was agreed to by Nazi Germany and the Soviet Union; subsequently the two powers and Slovakia invaded Poland. The 1945 Yalta Conference among the Allies allotted Poland to the Soviet sphere of influence. The Second World War had a profound effect on Brzeziński, who stated in an interview: "The extraordinary violence that was perpetrated against Poland did affect my perception of the world, and made me much more sensitive to the fact that a great deal of world politics is a fundamental struggle."

== Academia ==
After attending Loyola College in Montreal, Brzeziński entered McGill University in 1945 to obtain both his Bachelor and Master of Arts degrees (received in 1949 and 1950 respectively). His Master's thesis focused on the various nationalities within the Soviet Union. Brzeziński's plan for pursuing further studies in the United Kingdom in preparation for a diplomatic career in Canada fell through, principally because he was ruled ineligible for a scholarship he had won that was only open to British subjects. Brzeziński then attended Harvard University to work on a doctorate with Merle Fainsod, focusing on the Soviet Union and the relationship between the October Revolution, Vladimir Lenin's state, and the actions of Joseph Stalin. He received his Ph.D. in 1953; the same year, he traveled to Munich and met Jan Nowak-Jeziorański, head of the Polish desk of Radio Free Europe. He later collaborated with Carl J. Friedrich to develop the concept of totalitarianism as a way to characterize more accurately and powerfully, and to criticize the Soviets in 1956.

Brzeziński was on the faculty of Harvard University from 1953 to 1960, and of Columbia University from 1960 to 1972 where he headed the Research Institute on Communist Affairs. He was Senior Research Professor of International Relations at the Paul H. Nitze School of Advanced International Studies at Johns Hopkins University in Washington, D.C.

For historical background on major events during this period, see:

- History of Poland: Gomułka's road to socialism (1956–1970), and
- 1956 Hungarian Revolution.

As a Harvard professor, he argued against Dwight Eisenhower's and John Foster Dulles's policy of rollback, saying that antagonism would push Eastern Europe further toward the Soviets. The Polish protests followed by the Polish October and the Hungarian Revolution in 1956 lent some support to Brzeziński's idea that the Eastern Europeans could gradually counter Soviet domination. In 1957, he visited Poland for the first time since he left as a child, and his visit reaffirmed his judgement that splits within the Eastern bloc were profound. He developed ideas that he called "peaceful engagement". Brzeziński became a naturalized American citizen in 1958.

Very soon after Harvard awarded an associate professorship in 1959 to Henry Kissinger instead of to him, Brzeziński moved to New York City to teach at Columbia University. There he wrote Soviet Bloc: Unity and Conflict, which focused on Eastern Europe since the beginning of the Cold War. He also taught future Secretary of State Madeleine Albright, who like Brzeziński's wife Emilie was of Czech descent, and whom he also mentored during her early years in Washington. He also became a member of the Council on Foreign Relations in New York and joined the Bilderberg Group.

During the 1960 U.S. presidential elections, Brzeziński was an advisor to the John F. Kennedy campaign, urging a non-antagonistic policy toward Eastern European governments. Seeing the Soviet Union as having entered a period of stagnation, both economic and political, Brzeziński predicted a future breakup of the Soviet Union along lines of nationality (expanding on his master's thesis).

As a scholar, he developed his thoughts over the years, fashioning fundamental theories on international relations and geostrategy. During the 1950s he worked on the theory of totalitarianism. His thought in the 1960s focused on wider Western understanding of disunity in the Soviet Bloc, as well as developing the thesis of intensified degeneration of the Soviet Union. During the 1970s he proposed that the Soviet system was incapable of evolving beyond the industrial phase into the "technetronic" age.

Brzeziński continued to argue for and support détente for the next few years, publishing "Peaceful Engagement in Eastern Europe" in Foreign Affairs, and he continued to support non-antagonistic policies after the Cuban Missile Crisis on the grounds that such policies might disabuse Eastern European nations of their fear of an aggressive Germany, and pacify Western Europeans fearful of a superpower compromise along the lines of the Yalta Conference. In a 1962 book Brzeziński argued against the possibility of a Sino-Soviet split, saying their alignment was "not splitting and is not likely to split."

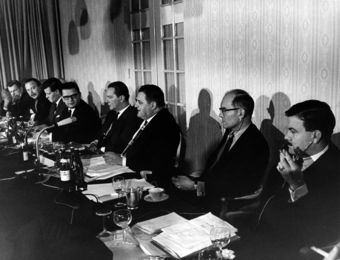
The conference venue at the Hotel Regina during the second Wehrkunde-Begegnung in 1964. Pictured are, among others, Zbigniew Brzeziński (far left) as well as Ewald von Kleist and Franz Josef Strauss (center).

In 1964, Brzeziński supported Lyndon Johnson's presidential campaign and the Great Society and civil rights policies, while on the other hand he saw Soviet leadership as having been purged of any creativity following the ousting of Khrushchev. Through Jan Nowak-Jezioranski, Brzeziński met with Adam Michnik, future Polish Solidarity activist.

Brzeziński continued to support engagement with Eastern European governments, while warning against De Gaulle's vision of a "Europe from the Atlantic to the Urals." He also supported the Vietnam War. In 1966, Brzeziński was appointed to the Policy Planning Council of the U.S. Department of State (President Johnson's October 7, 1966, "Bridge Building" speech was a product of Brzeziński's influence). In 1968, Brzeziński resigned from the council in protest of President Johnson's expansion of the war. Next, he became a foreign policy advisor to Vice President Hubert Humphrey.

For historical background on events during this period, see:

- Six-Day War;
- Prague Spring, and
- Socialism with a human face;
- Tet Offensive.

The Soviet invasion of Czechoslovakia further reinforced Brzeziński's criticisms of the right's aggressive stance toward Eastern European governments. His service to the Johnson administration, and his fact-finding trip to Vietnam, made him an enemy of the New Left.

For the 1968 U.S. presidential campaign, Brzeziński was chairman of the Humphrey's Foreign Policy Task Force.

Brzeziński called for a pan-European conference, an idea that would eventually find fruition in 1973 as the Conference for Security and Co-operation in Europe. Meanwhile, he became a leading critic of both the Nixon–Kissinger détente condominium, as well as George McGovern's pacifism.

== The Trilateral Commission ==
The Trilateral Commission emblem

In his 1970 piece Between Two Ages: America's Role in the Technetronic Era, Brzeziński argued that a coordinated policy among developed nations was necessary in order to counter global instability erupting from increasing economic inequality. Out of this thesis, Brzeziński co-founded the Trilateral Commission with David Rockefeller, serving as director from 1973 to 1976. The Trilateral Commission is a group of prominent political and business leaders and academics primarily from the United States, Western Europe and Japan. Its purpose was to strengthen relations among the three most industrially advanced regions of the capitalist world. In 1974, Brzeziński selected Georgia Governor Jimmy Carter as a member.

== Advisor to President Carter ==
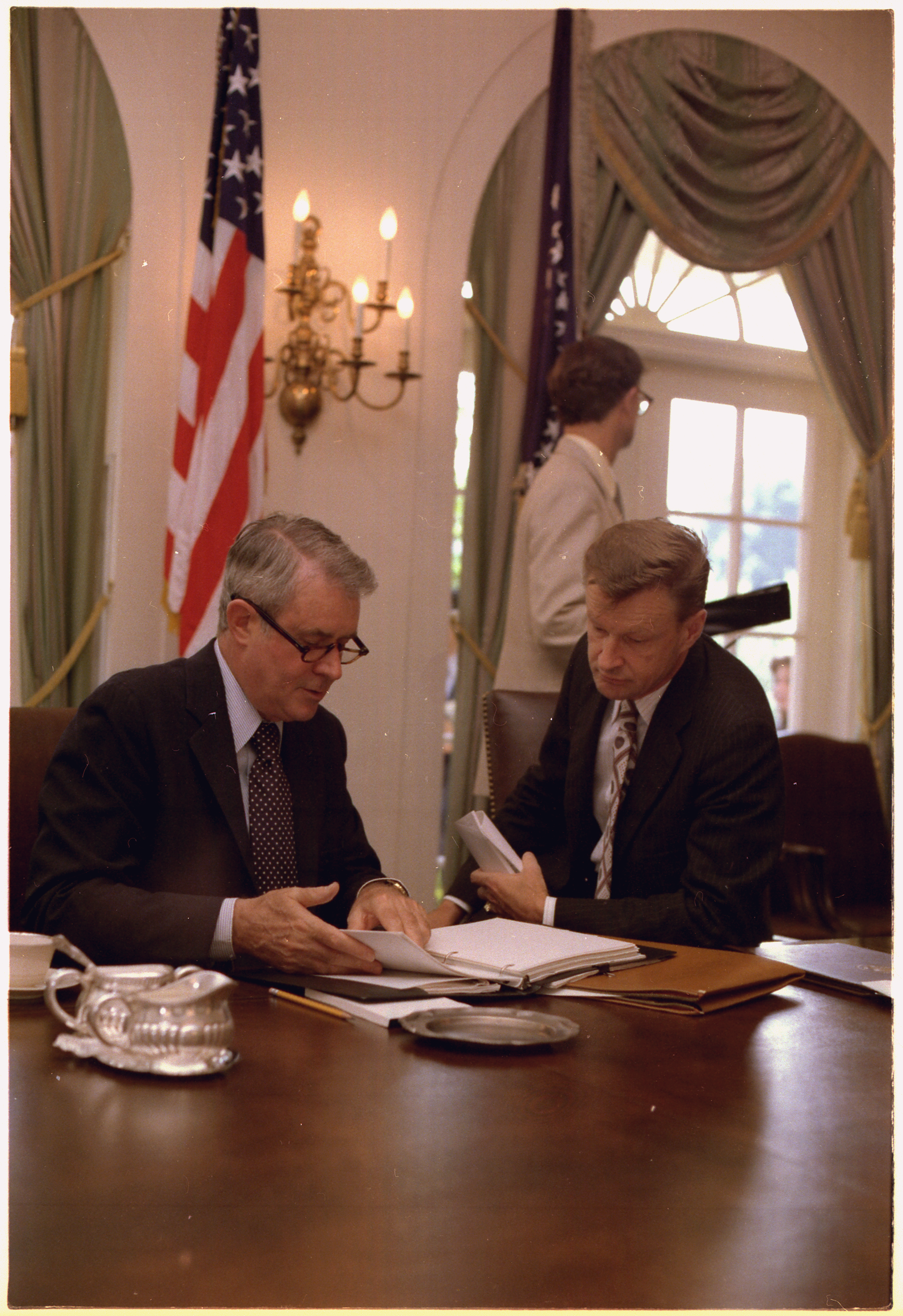
Secretary of State Cyrus Vance and National Security Council Advisor Zbigniew Brzeziński (1977)

Carter announced his candidacy for the 1976 presidential campaign to a skeptical media and proclaimed himself an "eager student" of Brzeziński. Brzeziński became Carter's principal foreign policy advisor by late 1975. He became an outspoken critic of the Nixon-Kissinger over-reliance on détente, a situation preferred by the Soviet Union, favoring the Helsinki process instead, which focused on human rights, international law and peaceful engagement in Eastern Europe. Brzeziński was considered to be the Democrats' response to Republican Henry Kissinger. Carter engaged his incumbent opponent for the presidency, Gerald Ford, in foreign policy debates by contrasting the Trilateral vision with Ford's détente.

After his victory in 1976, Carter made Brzeziński National Security Advisor. Earlier that year, major labor riots broke out in Poland, laying the foundations for Solidarity. Brzeziński began by emphasizing the "Basket III" human rights in the Helsinki Final Act, which inspired Charter 77 in Czechoslovakia shortly thereafter.

Brzeziński assisted with writing parts of Carter's inaugural address, and this served his purpose of sending a positive message to Soviet dissidents. The Soviet Union and Western European leaders both complained that this kind of rhetoric ran against the "code of détente" that Nixon and Kissinger had established. Brzeziński ran up against members of his own Democratic Party who disagreed with this interpretation of détente, including Secretary of State Cyrus Vance. Vance argued for less emphasis on human rights in order to gain Soviet agreement to Strategic Arms Limitation Talks (SALT), whereas Brzeziński favored doing both at the same time. Brzeziński then ordered Radio Free Europe transmitters to increase the power and area of their broadcasts, a provocative reversal of Nixon-Kissinger policies. West German chancellor Helmut Schmidt objected to Brzeziński's agenda, even calling for the removal of Radio Free Europe from German soil.

The State Department was alarmed by Brzeziński's support for dissidents in East Germany and objected to his suggestion that Carter's first overseas visit be to Poland. He visited Warsaw and met with Cardinal Stefan Wyszyński (against the objection of the U.S. Ambassador to Poland), recognizing the Catholic Church as the legitimate opposition to communist rule in Poland.

By 1978, Brzeziński and Vance were more and more at odds over the direction of Carter's foreign policy. Vance sought to continue the style of détente engineered by Nixon-Kissinger, with a focus on arms control. Brzeziński believed that détente emboldened the Soviets in Angola and the Middle East, and so he argued for increased military strength and an emphasis on human rights. Vance, the State Department, and the media criticized Brzeziński publicly as seeking to revive the Cold War. Brzeziński advised Carter in 1978 to engage the People's Republic of China and traveled to Beijing to lay the groundwork for the normalization of relations between the two countries. This also resulted in the severing of ties with the United States' longtime anti-Communist ally the Republic of China (Taiwan).

Brzeziński's influence over President Carter persuaded the latter to, despite the misgivings of his own Department of State, also pursue a more belligerent policy towards Cuba with regards to its role in Africa, which he perceived to be part of a wider Soviet plot to destabilise and dominate the continent. Carter denounced the Cuban government's support of the regime of Mengistu Haile Mariam in Ethiopia during the Ogaden War.

For historical background on this period of history, see:
- Iranian Revolution;
- Soviet invasion of Afghanistan; and
- Solidarity.

The year 1979 saw two major strategically important events: the overthrow of U.S. ally the Shah of Iran, and the Soviet invasion of Afghanistan. The Iranian Revolution precipitated the Iran hostage crisis, which would last for the rest of Carter's presidency. Brzeziński anticipated the Soviet invasion, and, with the support of Saudi Arabia, Pakistan, and the People's Republic of China, he created a strategy to undermine the Soviet presence. Using this atmosphere of insecurity, Brzeziński led the United States toward a new arms buildup and the development of the Rapid Deployment Forces—policies that are both more generally associated with Reagan's presidency now.

In 1979, the Soviets intervened in the Second Yemenite War. The Soviet backing of South Yemen constituted a "smaller shock", in tandem with tensions that were rising due to the Iranian Revolution. This played a role in shifting Carter's viewpoint on the Soviet Union to a more assertive one, a shift that finalized with the Soviet-Afghan War.

Brzeziński constantly urged either the restoration of the Shah of Iran to power or a military takeover, whatever the short-term costs in terms of values.

On November 9, 1979, Brzeziński was awakened at 3 am by a phone call with a startling message: The Soviets had just launched 250 nuclear weapons at the United States. Minutes later, Brzeziński received another call: The early-warning system actually showed 2,000 missiles heading toward the United States. As Brzeziński prepared to phone President Jimmy Carter to plan a full-scale response, he received a third call: It was a false alarm. An early warning training tape generating indications of a large-scale Soviet nuclear attack had somehow transferred to the actual early warning network, which triggered an all-too-real scramble.

Brzeziński, acting under a lame duck Carter presidency—but encouraged that Solidarity in Poland had vindicated his style of engagement with Eastern Europe—took a hard-line stance against what seemed like an imminent Soviet invasion of Poland. He even made a midnight phone call to Pope John Paul II (whose visit to Poland in 1979 had foreshadowed the emergence of Solidarity) warning him in advance. The U.S. stance was a significant change from previous reactions to Soviet repression in Hungary in 1956 and Czechoslovakia in 1968.

Brzeziński developed the Carter Doctrine, which committed the U.S. to use military force in defense of the Persian Gulf. In 1981 President Carter presented Brzeziński with the Presidential Medal of Freedom.

== National Security Advisor ==
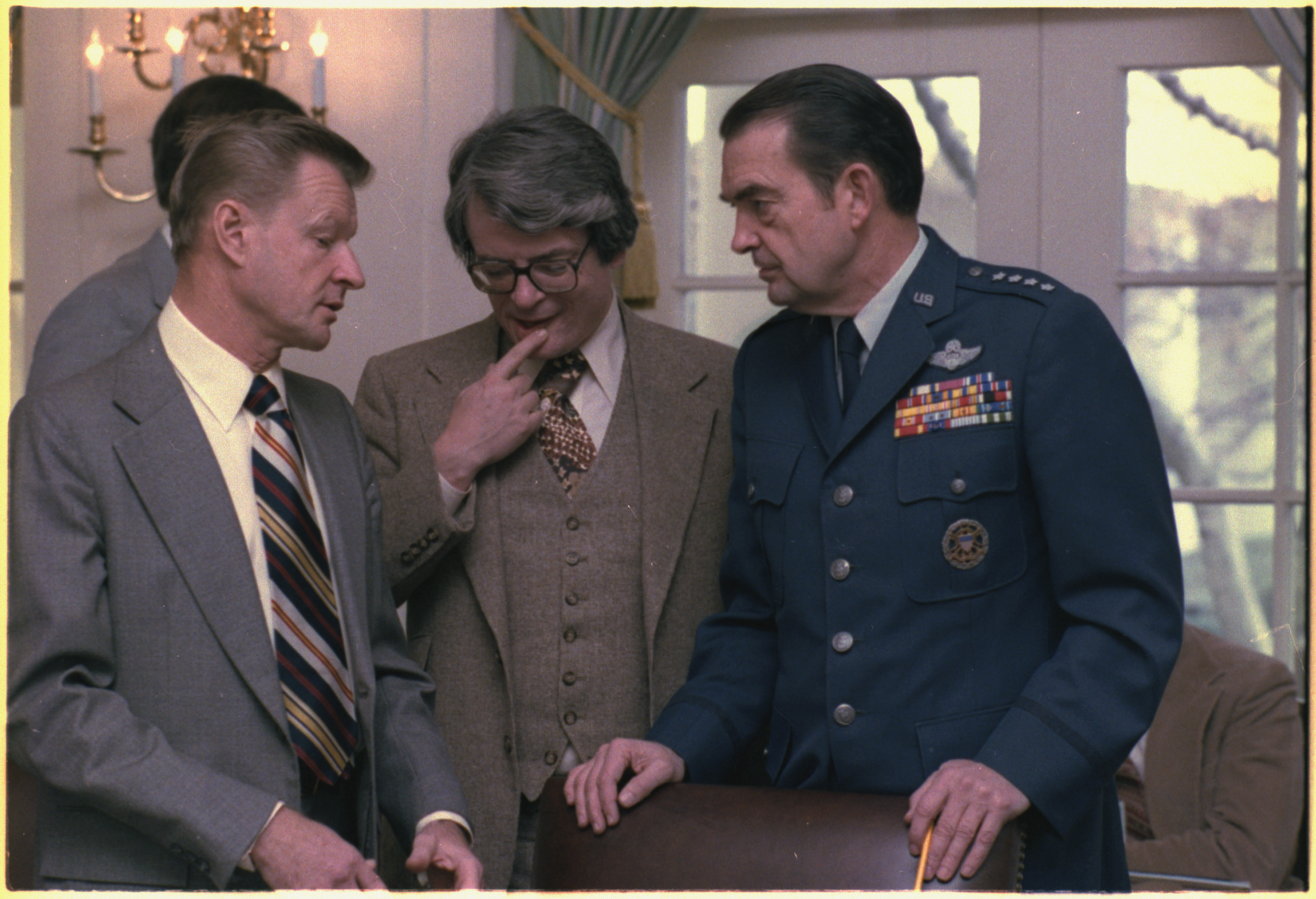
National Security Advisor Zbigniew Brzeziński with Chairman of The Joint Chiefs of Staff General David C. Jones and Deputy National Security Advisor David L. Aaron, following National Security Council meeting at The White House, December 20, 1978

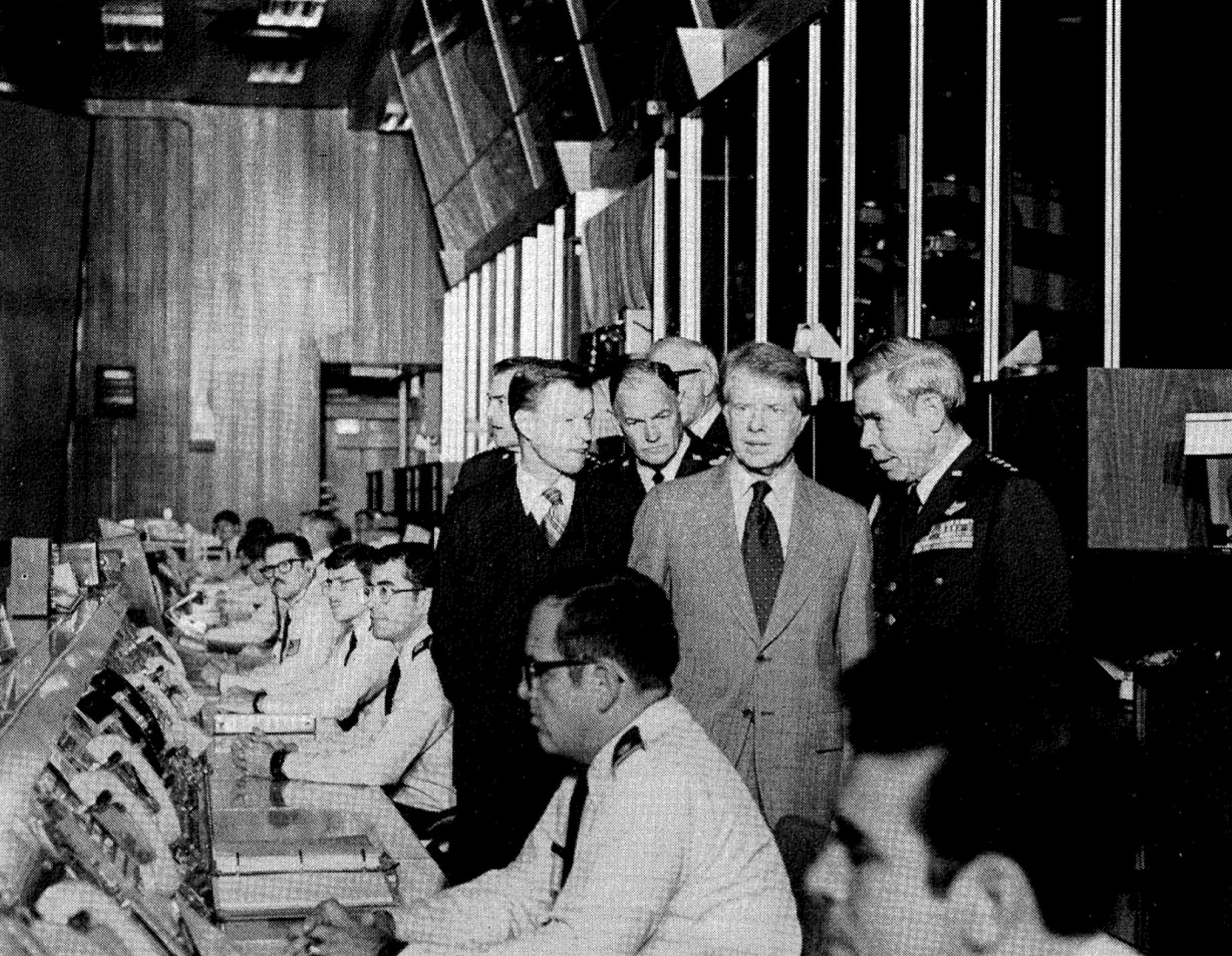
National Security Advisor Zbigniew Brzeziński accompanying President Jimmy Carter during a visit to Strategic Air Command's Headquarters in Offutt Air Force Base, Nebraska

President Carter chose Brzeziński for the position of National Security Adviser (NSA) because he wanted an assertive intellectual at his side to provide him with day-to-day advice and guidance on foreign policy decisions. Brzeziński would preside over a reorganized National Security Council (NSC) structure, fashioned to ensure that the NSA would be only one of many players in the foreign policy process.

Initially, Carter reduced the NSC staff by one-half, and decreased the number of standing NSC committees from eight to two. All issues referred to the NSC were reviewed by one of the two new committees, either the Policy Review Committee (PRC) or the Special Coordinating Committee (SCC). The PRC focused on specific issues, and its chairmanship rotated. The SCC was always chaired by Brzeziński, a circumstance he had to negotiate with Carter to achieve. Carter believed that by making the NSA chairman of only one of the two committees, he would prevent the NSC from being the overwhelming influence on foreign policy decisions it had been under Kissinger's chairmanship during the Nixon administration.

The SCC was charged with considering issues that cut across several departments, including oversight of intelligence activities, arms control evaluation, and crisis management. Much of the SCC's time during the Carter years was spent on SALT issues. The Council held few formal meetings, convening only 10 times, compared with 125 meetings during the eight years of the Nixon and Ford administrations. Instead, Carter used frequent, informal meetings as a decision-making device—typically his Friday breakfasts—usually attended by the Vice President, the secretaries of State and Defense, Brzeziński, and the chief domestic adviser.

No agendas were prepared and no formal records were kept of these meetings, sometimes resulting in differing interpretations of the decisions actually agreed upon. Brzeziński was careful, in managing his own weekly luncheons with secretaries Vance and Brown in preparation for NSC discussions, to maintain a complete set of notes. Brzeziński also sent weekly reports to the President on major foreign policy undertakings and problems, with recommendations for courses of action. President Carter enjoyed these reports and frequently annotated them with his own views. Brzeziński and the NSC used these presidential notes (159 of them) as the basis for NSC actions.

From the beginning, Brzeziński made sure that the new NSC institutional relationships would assure him a major voice in the shaping of foreign policy. While he knew that Carter would not want him to be another Kissinger, Brzeziński also felt confident that the President did not want Secretary of State Vance to become another Dulles and would want his own input on key foreign policy decisions. Brzeziński's power gradually expanded into the operational area during the Carter Presidency. He increasingly assumed the role of a presidential emissary. In 1978, for example, Brzeziński traveled to Beijing to lay the groundwork for normalizing U.S.–PRC relations.

Like Kissinger before him, Brzeziński maintained his own personal relationship with Soviet Ambassador to the United States Anatoly Dobrynin. Brzeziński had NSC staffers monitor State Department cable traffic through the Situation Room and call back to the State Department if the President preferred to revise or take issue with outgoing State Department instructions. He also appointed his own press spokesman, and his frequent press briefings and appearances on television interview shows made him a prominent public figure, although perhaps not nearly as much as Kissinger had been under Nixon.

The Soviet military invasion of Afghanistan in December 1979 significantly damaged the already tenuous relationship between Vance and Brzeziński. Vance felt that Brzeziński's linkage of SALT to other Soviet activities and the MX, together with the growing domestic criticisms in the United States of the SALT II Accord, convinced Brezhnev to decide on military intervention in Afghanistan. Brzeziński, however, later recounted that he advanced proposals to maintain Afghanistan's independence but was frustrated by the Department of State's opposition. An NSC working group on Afghanistan wrote several reports on the deteriorating situation in 1979, but Carter ignored them until the Soviet intervention destroyed his illusions. Only then did he decide to abandon SALT II ratification and pursue the anti-Soviet policies that Brzeziński proposed.

The Iranian revolution was the last straw for the disintegrating relationship between Vance and Brzeziński. As the upheaval developed, the two advanced fundamentally different positions. Brzeziński wanted to control the revolution and increasingly suggested military action to prevent Ayatollah Khomeini from coming to power, while Vance wanted to come to terms with the new Islamic Republic of Iran. As a consequence, Carter failed to develop a coherent approach to the Iranian situation. Vance's resignation following the unsuccessful mission to rescue the American hostages in March 1980, undertaken over his objections, was the final result of the deep disagreement between Brzeziński and Vance.

=== Major policies ===
During the 1960s, Brzeziński articulated the strategy of peaceful engagement for undermining the Soviet bloc, and while serving on the State Department Policy Planning Council, persuaded President Lyndon B. Johnson to adopt (in October 1966) peaceful engagement as U.S. strategy, placing détente ahead of German reunification and thus reversing prior U.S. priorities.

During the 1970s and 1980s, at the height of his political involvement, Brzeziński participated in the formation of the Trilateral Commission in order to more closely cement U.S.–Japanese–European relations. As the three most economically advanced sectors of the world, the people of the three regions could be brought together in cooperation that would give them a more cohesive stance against the communist world.

While serving in the White House, Brzeziński emphasized the centrality of human rights as a means of placing the Soviet Union on the ideological defensive. With Jimmy Carter in Camp David, he assisted in the attainment of the Egypt–Israel peace treaty.

==== Afghanistan ====
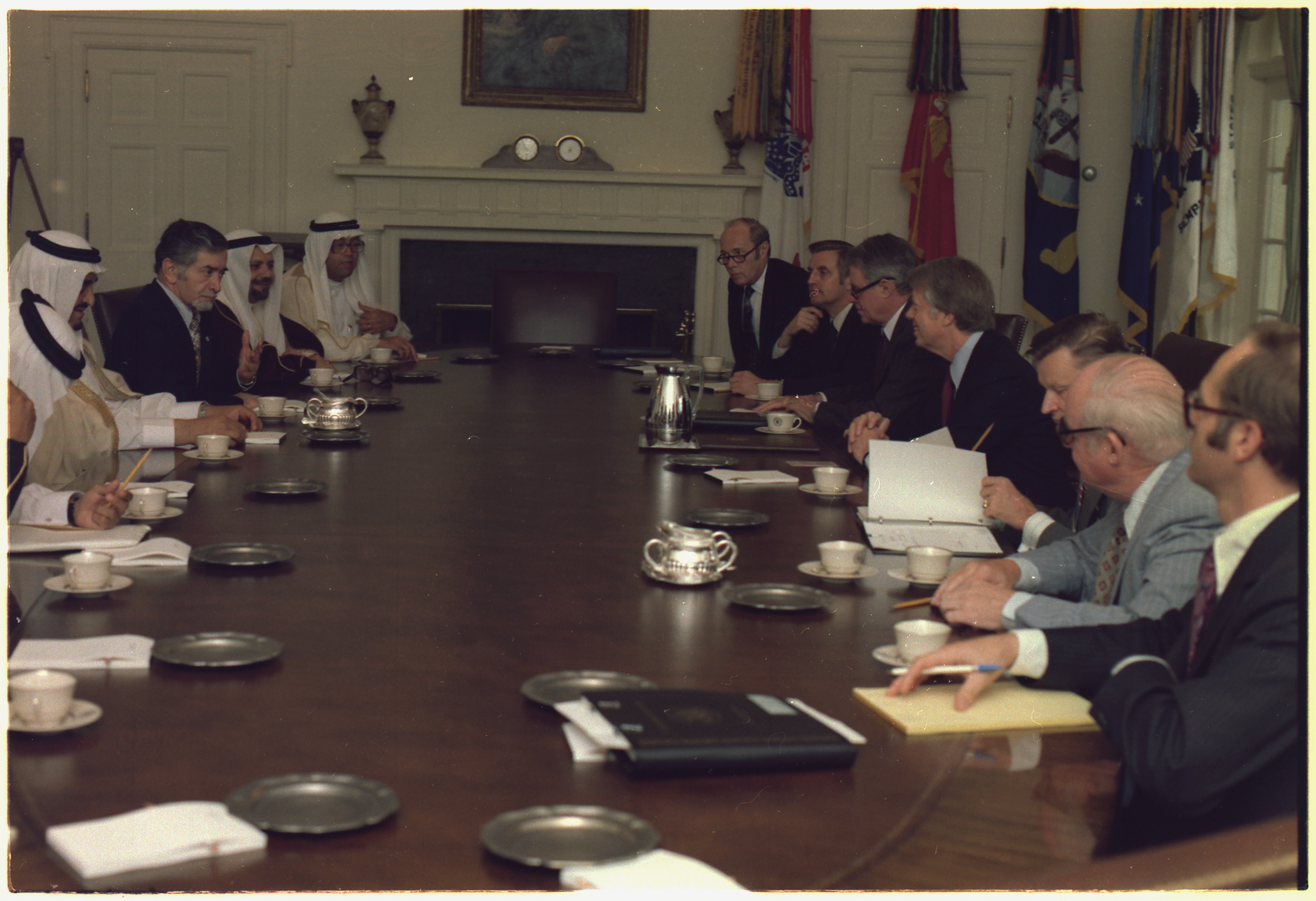
Carter, Brzeziński and Prince Fahd of Saudi Arabia

Communists under the leadership of Nur Muhammad Taraki seized power in Afghanistan on April 27, 1978. The new regime—divided between Taraki's extremist Khalq faction and the more moderate Parcham—signed a treaty of friendship with the Soviet Union in December of that year. Taraki's efforts to improve secular education and redistribute land were accompanied by mass executions (including of many conservative religious leaders) and political oppression unprecedented in Afghan history, igniting a revolt by mujahideen rebels.

Following a general uprising in April 1979, Taraki was deposed by Khalq rival Hafizullah Amin in September. Amin was considered a "brutal psychopath" by foreign observers; even the Soviets were alarmed by the brutality of the Afghan communists, and suspected Amin of being an agent of the U.S. Central Intelligence Agency (CIA), although that was not the case. By December, Amin's government had lost control of much of the country, prompting the Soviet Union to invade Afghanistan, execute Amin, and install Parcham leader Babrak Karmal as president.

President Carter was surprised by the invasion, as the consensus of the U.S. intelligence community during 1978 and 1979—reiterated as late as September 29, 1979—was that "Moscow would not intervene in force even if it appeared likely that the Khalq government was about to collapse." Indeed, Carter's diary entries from November 1979 until the Soviet invasion in late December contain only two short references to Afghanistan, and are instead preoccupied with the ongoing hostage crisis in Iran. In the West, the Soviet invasion of Afghanistan was considered a threat to global security and the oil supplies of the Persian Gulf.

Moreover, the failure to accurately predict Soviet intentions caused American officials to reappraise the Soviet threat to both Iran and Pakistan, although it is now known that those fears were overblown. For example, U.S. intelligence closely followed Soviet exercises for an invasion of Iran throughout 1980, while an earlier warning from Brzeziński that "if the Soviets came to dominate Afghanistan, they could promote a separate Baluchistan ... [thus] dismembering Pakistan and Iran" took on new urgency.

These concerns were a major factor in the unrequited efforts of both the Carter and Reagan administrations to improve relations with Iran, and resulted in massive aid to Pakistan's Muhammad Zia-ul-Haq. Zia's ties with the U.S. had been strained during Carter's presidency due to Pakistan's nuclear program and the execution of Zulfikar Ali Bhutto in April 1979, but Carter told Brzeziński and Secretary of State Cyrus Vance as early as January 1979 that it was vital to "repair our relationships with Pakistan" in light of the unrest in Iran.

One initiative Carter authorized to achieve this goal was a collaboration between the CIA and Pakistan's Inter-Services Intelligence (ISI); through the ISI, the CIA began providing some $695,000 worth of non-lethal assistance to the mujahideen on July 3, 1979—several months prior to the Soviet invasion. The modest scope of this early collaboration was likely influenced by the understanding, later recounted by CIA official Robert Gates, "that a substantial U.S. covert aid program" might have "raise[d] the stakes" thereby causing "the Soviets to intervene more directly and vigorously than otherwise intended". The first shipment of U.S. weapons intended for the mujahideen reached Pakistan on January 10, 1980, shortly following the Soviet invasion.

In the aftermath of the invasion, Carter was determined to respond vigorously to what he considered a dangerous provocation. In a televised speech, he announced sanctions on the Soviet Union, promised renewed aid to Pakistan, and committed the U.S. to the Persian Gulf's defense. The thrust of U.S. policy for the duration of the war was determined by Carter in early 1980: Carter initiated a program to arm the mujahideen through Pakistan's ISI and secured a pledge from Saudi Arabia to match U.S. funding for this purpose. U.S. support for the mujahideen accelerated under Carter's successor, Ronald Reagan, at a final cost to U.S. taxpayers of some $3 billion. The Soviets were unable to quell the insurgency and withdrew from Afghanistan in 1989, precipitating the dissolution of the Soviet Union itself.

However, the decision to route U.S. aid through Pakistan led to massive fraud, as weapons sent to Karachi were frequently sold on the local market rather than delivered to the Afghan rebels; Karachi soon "became one of the most violent cities in the world". Pakistan also controlled which rebels received assistance: of the seven mujahideen groups supported by Zia's government, four espoused Islamic fundamentalist beliefs—and these fundamentalists received most of the funding. Years later, in a 1997 CNN/National Security Archive interview, Brzeziński detailed the strategy taken by the Carter administration against the Soviets in 1979:

We immediately launched a twofold process when we heard that the Soviets had entered Afghanistan. The first involved direct reactions and sanctions focused on the Soviet Union, and both the State Department and the National Security Council prepared long lists of sanctions to be adopted, of steps to be taken to increase the international costs to the Soviet Union of their actions. And the second course of action led to my going to Pakistan a month or so after the Soviet invasion of Afghanistan, for the purpose of coordinating with the Pakistanis a joint response, the purpose of which would be to make the Soviets bleed for as much and as long as is possible; and we engaged in that effort in a collaborative sense with the Saudis, the Egyptians, the British, the Chinese, and we started providing weapons to the Mujaheddin, from various sources again—for example, some Soviet arms from the Egyptians and the Chinese. We even got Soviet arms from the Czechoslovak communist government, since it was obviously susceptible to material incentives; and at some point we started buying arms for the Mujaheddin from the Soviet army in Afghanistan, because that army was increasingly corrupt.

===== "Afghan Trap" theory =====
Following the September 11 attacks, a theory that Brzeziński intentionally provoked the Soviet invasion of Afghanistan in December 1979 was widely repeated. Some adherents of this theory thus blamed Brzeziński (and the Carter administration) for events subsequent to the Soviet invasion, including the decades-long Afghanistan conflict (1978–present) and the September 11 attacks. A 2020 review of declassified U.S. documents by Conor Tobin in the journal Diplomatic History contends that this theory—referred to as the "Afghan Trap" theory by the author—is a misrepresentation of the historical record based almost entirely on a "caricature" of Brzeziński as an anti-communist fanatic, a disputed statement attributed to Brzeziński by a Le Nouvel Observateur journalist in 1998 (which was "repeatedly den[ied]" by Brzeziński himself), "and the circumstantial fact that U.S. support antedated the invasion." In addition to Tobin, several academic or journalistic sources have questioned the veracity of aspects of the "Afghan Trap" theory, as have at least two former high-ranking Carter administration officials.

While it is true that the March 1979 Herat uprising in Afghanistan and a desire to rebuild strained U.S. relations with Pakistani leader Muhammad Zia-ul-Haq in light of the Iranian Revolution prompted Carter to sign presidential findings in July 1979 permitting the CIA to spend $695,000 on non-military assistance (e.g., "cash, medical equipment, and radio transmitters") to Afghan mujahideen insurgents (and on a propaganda campaign targeting the Soviet-backed leadership of the Democratic Republic of Afghanistan or DRA), internal deliberations show that "U.S. policies were almost wholly reactive ... to the Soviets' escalating military presence" with policymakers rejecting "a substantial covert aid program" (including lethal provisions) "to avoid provoking Moscow." (The Soviet military and political presence in Afghanistan steadily increased throughout 1979, including "tens of millions of dollars in military aid provided by Moscow to the DRA.")

According to Tobin, Brzeziński went to considerable lengths to dissuade the Soviets from invading Afghanistan, urging the Carter administration to publicize information regarding the growing Soviet military role in Afghanistan's nascent civil war and to explicitly warn the Soviets of severe sanctions in the event of an invasion; when his warnings were watered-down by the State Department under the leadership of Secretary of State Cyrus Vance, Brzeziński leaked information to a journalist, resulting in an August 1979 article in The New York Times headlined "U.S. Is Indirectly Pressing Russians to Halt Afghanistan Intervention." (Ironically, Soviet general Valentin Varennikov complained in 1995 that American officials had never made Afghanistan's strategic significance clear to their Soviet counterparts prior to December 1979, speculating—in line with the "Afghan Trap" theory—that this omission may have been deliberate as the U.S. "had an interest in us getting stuck in Afghanistan, and paying the greatest possible price for that.") Furthermore, Brzeziński attempted to discretely negotiate a withdrawal of Soviet troops with Soviet ambassador Anatoly Dobrynin during 1980, privately conceding that the country would likely remain within the Soviet sphere of influence following a diplomatic settlement, as he had little confidence in the mujahideen's ability to inflict a military defeat on the Red Army.

Carter administration officials Robert Gates and Vice President Walter Mondale criticized the "Afghan Trap" theory between 2010 and 2012, the former stating that it had "no basis in fact" and the latter calling it "a huge, unwarranted leap". Tobin concludes: "The small-scale covert program that developed in response to the increasing Soviet influence was part of a contingency plan if the Soviets did intervene militarily, as Washington would be in a better position to make it difficult for them to consolidate their position, but not designed to induce an intervention." Historian Robert Rakove wrote, the notion of a U.S. effort to entrap the Soviet Union in Afghanistan has been "methodically and effectively refuted by Conor Tobin". Steve Coll had previously stated in 2004 that "[c]ontemporary memos—particularly those written in the first days after the Soviet invasion—make clear that while Brzeziński was determined to confront the Soviets in Afghanistan through covert action, he was also very worried the Soviets would prevail. ... Given this evidence and the enormous political and security costs that the invasion imposed on the Carter administration, any claim that Brzeziński lured the Soviets into Afghanistan warrants deep skepticism." Coll's "specific debunking of the Brzeziński Nouvel Observateur interview" was cited by the National Security Archive in 2019. In 2016, Justin Vaïsse referred to "[t]he thesis according to which a trap was set having been dismissed" as "[s]uch a position would not be compatible with the archives". Elisabeth Leake, writing in 2022, agreed that "the original provision was certainly inadequate to force a Soviet armed intervention. Instead it adhered to broader US practices of providing limited covert support to anti-communist forces worldwide."

==== Iran ====
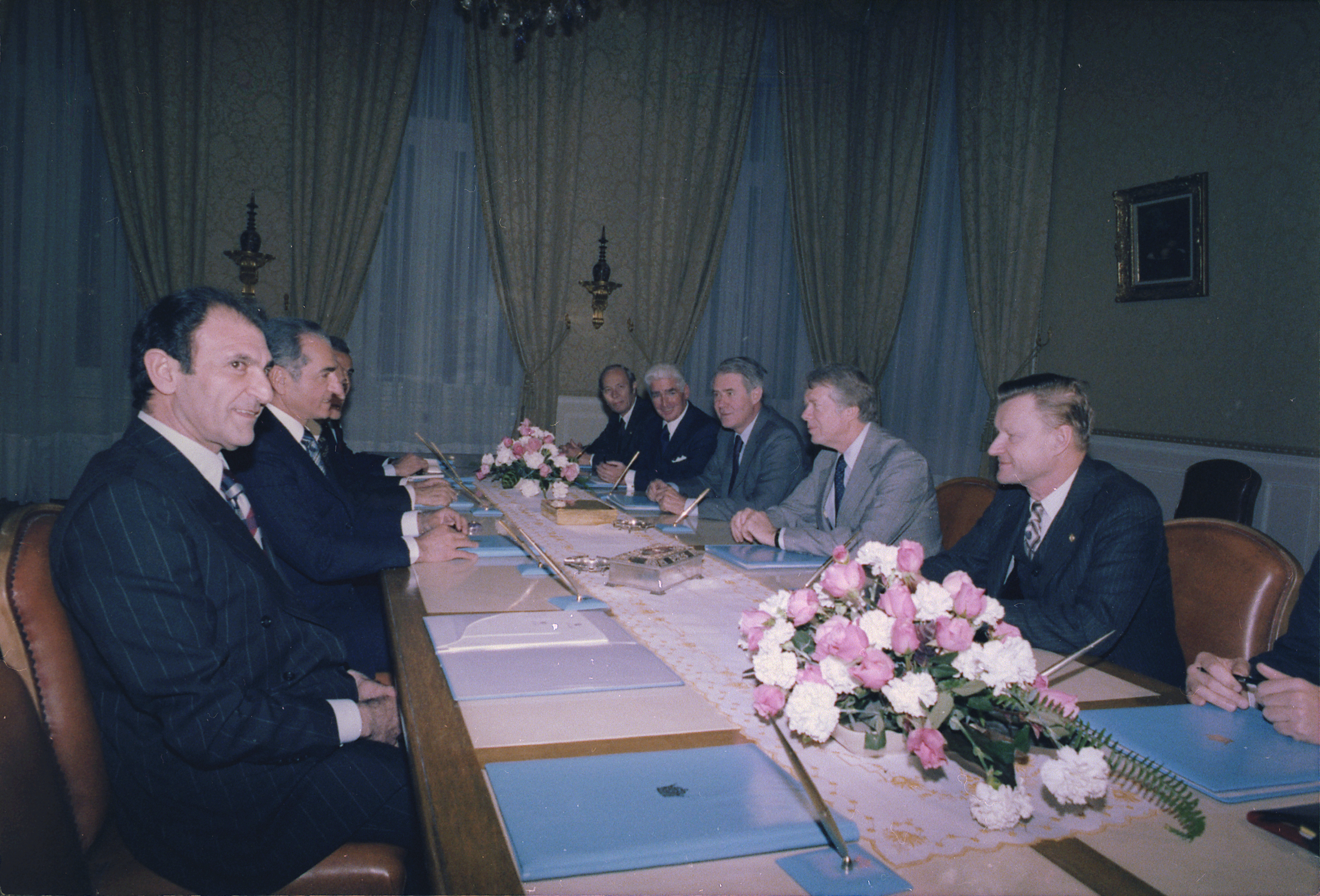
The Iranian Shah, Mohammad Reza Pahlavi, meeting with Alfred Atherton, William H. Sullivan, Cyrus Vance, President Jimmy Carter, and Zbigniew Brzeziński, in 1977

In November 1979, revolutionary students stormed the Embassy of the United States, Tehran and took American diplomats hostage. Brzeziński argued against Secretary of State Cyrus Vance's proposed diplomatic solutions to the Iran hostage crisis, insisting they "would deliver Iran to the Soviets." Vance, struggling with gout, went to Florida on Thursday, April 10, 1980, for a long weekend.

On Friday, Brzeziński held a newly scheduled meeting of the National Security Council and authorized Operation Eagle Claw, a military expedition into Tehran to rescue the hostages. Deputy Secretary Warren Christopher, who attended the meeting in Vance's place, did not inform Vance. Furious, Vance handed in his resignation on principle, calling Brzeziński "evil".

President Carter aborted the operation after three of the eight helicopters he had sent into the Dasht-e Kavir desert crashed, and a fourth then collided with a transport plane, causing a fire that killed eight servicemen. The hostages were ultimately released on the day of the first inauguration of Ronald Reagan, after 444 days in captivity.

Along with Kissinger and David Rockefeller, Brzeziński played a role in convincing Carter to admit the exiled Shah into the U.S.

Brzeziński has compared complaints by US officials about Iran's alleged nuclear ambitions to similar statements made before the Iraq war began: "I think the administration, the President and the Vice President particularly, are trying to hype the atmosphere, and that is reminiscent of what preceded the war in Iraq."

==== China ====
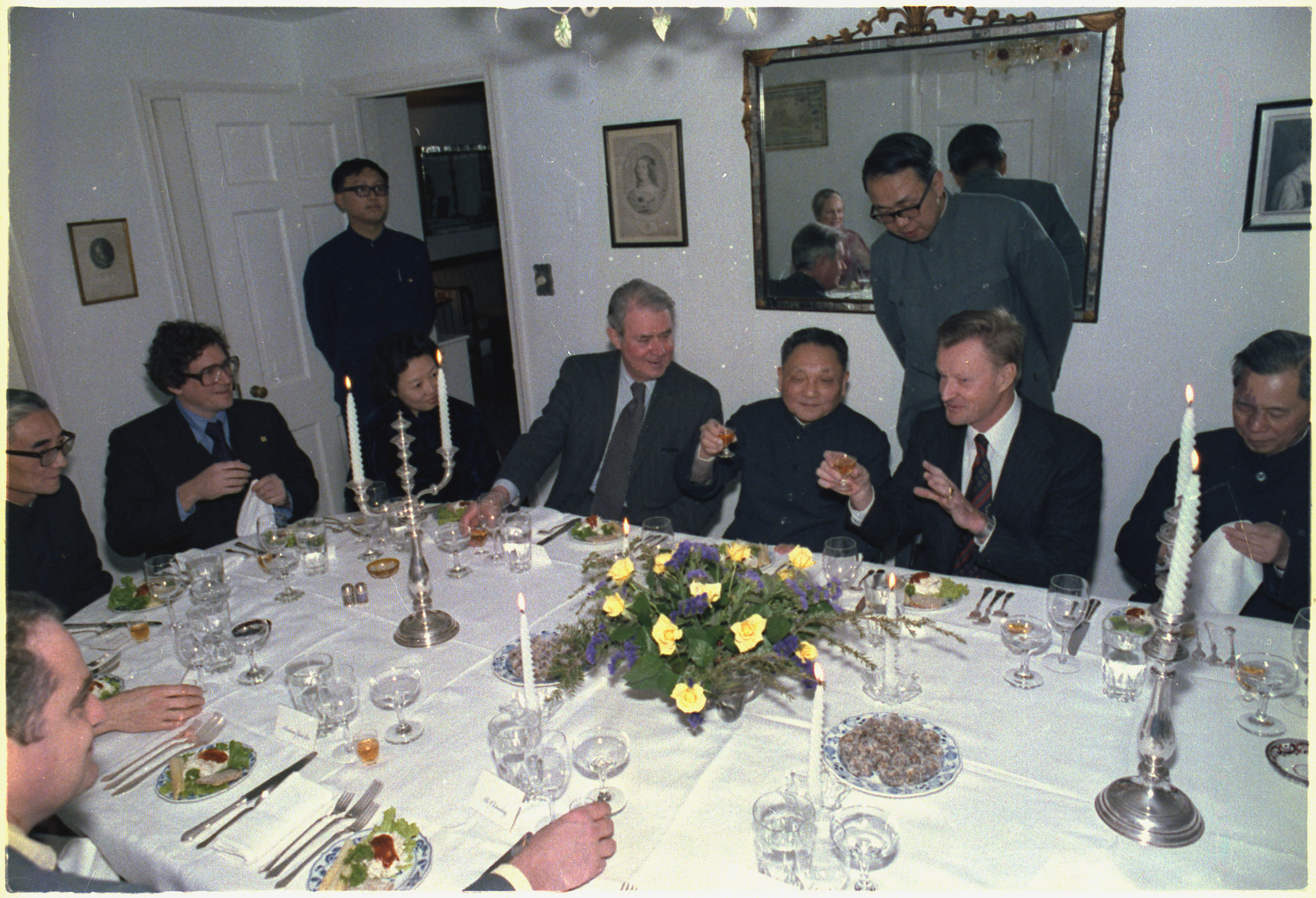
Zbigniew Brzeziński hosts a dinner for Chinese Communist leader Deng Xiaoping in 1979.

Shortly after taking office in 1977, President Carter again reaffirmed the United States' position of upholding the Shanghai Communiqué. In May 1978, Brzeziński overcame concerns from the State Department and traveled to Beijing, where he began talks that seven months later led to full diplomatic relations. The United States and People's Republic of China announced on December 15, 1978, that the two governments would establish diplomatic relations on January 1, 1979. This required that the United States sever relations with the Republic of China on Taiwan. Consolidating U.S. gains in befriending Communist China was a major priority stressed by Brzeziński during his time as National Security Advisor.

Brzeziński "denied reports that he encouraged China to support the genocidal dictator Pol Pot in Cambodia, because Pol Pot's Khmer Rouge were the enemies of communist Vietnam." However, following the Vietnamese invasion of Cambodia which toppled the Khmer Rouge, Brzeziński prevailed in having the administration refuse to recognize the new Cambodian government due to its support by the Soviet Union.

The most important strategic aspect of the new U.S.–Chinese relationship was in its effect on the Cold War. China was no longer considered part of a larger Sino-Soviet bloc but instead a third pole of power due to the Sino-Soviet Split, helping the United States against the Soviet Union.

In the Joint Communiqué on the Establishment of Diplomatic Relations dated January 1, 1979, the United States transferred diplomatic recognition from Taipei to Beijing. The United States reiterated the Shanghai Communiqué's acknowledgment of the PRC position that there is only one China and that Taiwan is a part of China; Beijing acknowledged that the United States would continue to carry on commercial, cultural, and other unofficial contacts with Taiwan. The Taiwan Relations Act made the necessary changes in U.S. law to permit unofficial relations with Taiwan to continue.

In addition the severing relations with the Republic of China, the Carter administration also agreed to unilaterally pull out of the Sino-American Mutual Defense Treaty, withdraw U.S. military personnel from Taiwan, and gradually reduce arms sales to the Republic of China. There was widespread opposition in Congress, notably from Republicans, due to the Republic of China's status as an anti-Communist ally in the Cold War. In Goldwater v. Carter, Barry Goldwater made a failed attempt to stop Carter from terminating the mutual defense treaty.

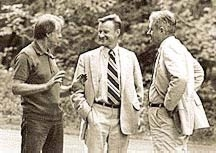
U.S. President Jimmy Carter with Zbigniew Brzeziński and Cyrus Vance at Camp David in 1977

==== Arab-Israeli conflict ====
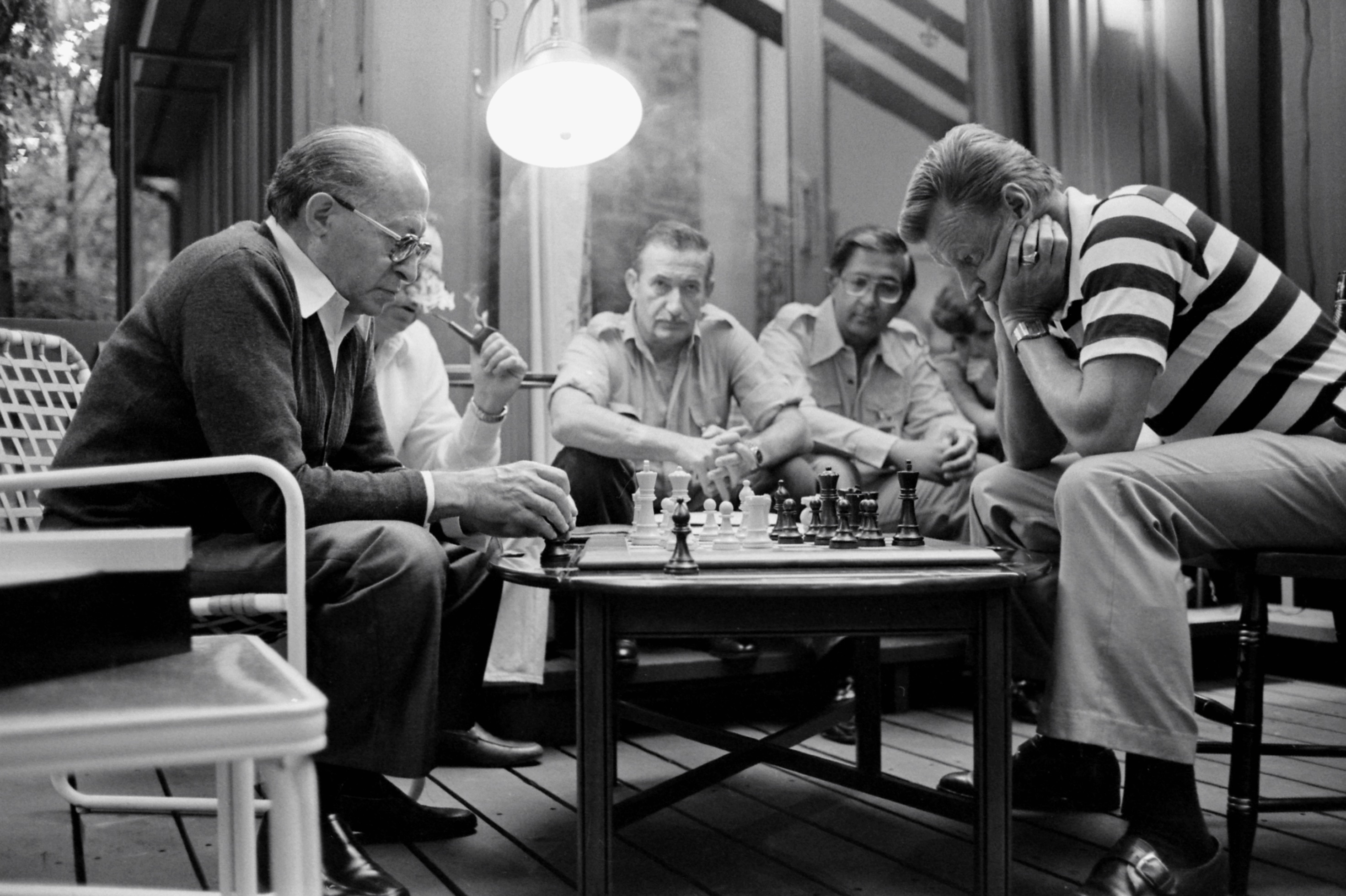
Israeli Prime Minister Menachem Begin engages Zbigniew Brzeziński in a game of chess at Camp David.

On October 10, 2007, Brzeziński along with other influential signatories sent a letter to President George W. Bush and Secretary of State Condoleezza Rice titled "Failure Risks Devastating Consequences." The letter was partly an advice and a warning of the failure of an upcoming U.S.-sponsored Middle East conference scheduled for November 2007 between representatives of Israelis and Palestinians. The letter also suggested to engage in "a genuine dialogue with Hamas" rather than to isolate it further.

==== Ending Soviet détente ====
Presidential Directive 18 on U.S. National Security, signed early in Carter's term, signaled a fundamental reassessment of the value of détente, and set the United States on a course to quietly end Kissinger's strategy.

Zbigniew Brzeziński played a major role in organizing Jimmy Carter's policies on the Soviet Union as a grand strategy. Brzeziński was a liberal Democrat and a committed anti-communist, favoring social justice while seeing world events in substantially Cold War terms. Additionally, according to Foreign Policy, "Brzeziński's outlook was anti-Soviet, but he also insisted, like George Kennan before him, on the necessity of cultivating a strong West."

Brzeziński stated that human rights could be used to put the Soviet Union ideologically on the defensive:

I felt strongly that in the U.S.-Soviet competition the appeal of America as a free society could become an important asset, and I saw in human rights an opportunity to put the Soviet Union ideologically on the defensive....by actively pursuing this' commitment we could mobilize far greater global support and focus global attention on the glaring internal weaknesses of the Soviet system.

Brzeziński's policy on Iran was thoroughly connected to the Soviet Union, because it was observed that each coup and revolution in 1979 had advanced Soviet power towards the Persian Gulf. Brzeziński advised President Carter that the United States's "greatest vulnerability" lay on an arc "stretching from Chittagong through Islamabad to Aden." This played a role in the Carter Doctrine.

==== Nuclear strategy ====
Presidential Directive 59, "Nuclear Employment Policy", dramatically changed U.S. targeting of nuclear weapons aimed at the Soviet Union. Implemented with the aid of Defense Secretary Harold Brown, this directive officially set the United States on a countervailing strategy.

==== Arms control ====
Zbigniew Brzeziński utilized the United States' need to stability and progress in political relations with the Soviet Union to spur on the call for a new strategic arms treaty. On April 5, 1979, Brzeziński made a speech at the Chicago Council on Foreign Relations where he stated that competition between the two powers and the nuclear arms race would not simply end because of the accord. According to him, the projected strategic arms treaty that would intend to impose limits on power such as missiles and bombers through the year 1989, would be what contributes to the progress and confidence in Soviet-American relations.

He aimed to frame his arms control policy in a way that portrayed it as favorable to create, ensure, and maintain Soviet-American relations. Leading up to the presidential election in 1980, the Carter administration set sight on confronting Ronald Reagan on arms control agreements with Moscow. On this issue, Brzeziński believed that to continue moving safely ahead with talks to control atomic arms with Moscow, despite Soviet troops holding position in Afghanistan, the United States needed to remain firm in containing Soviet expansionism.

Overall, Zbigniew Brzeziński's arms control views leaned skeptical and mistrusting of Soviet motives in general and emphasized the central importance of the East–West competition. On the other hand, other officials such as the Secretary of State Cyrus Vance worked to pave a way for a wider US-Soviet relationship. Arms control in Brzeziński's terms would take any opportunity to halt or reduce the momentum of the Soviet buildup.

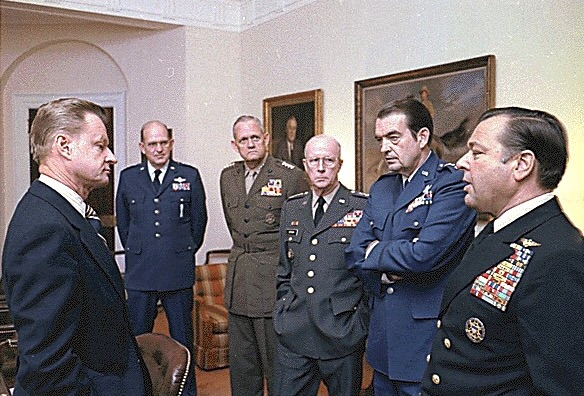
Chairman of the Joint Chiefs of Staff with National Security Advisor Zbigniew Brzeziński and the other members of Joint Chiefs of Staff during a National Security Council Meeting at The White House on October 5, 1978

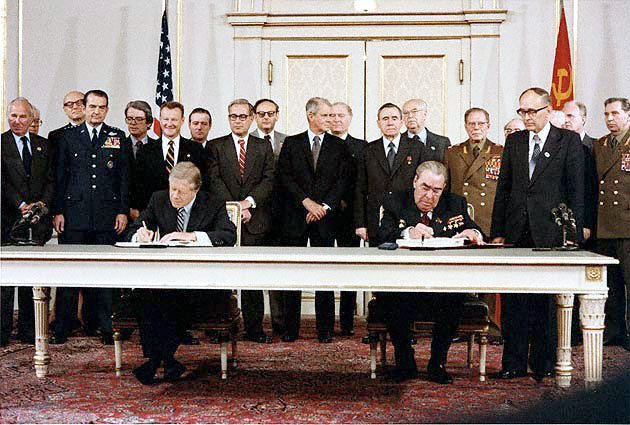
President Jimmy Carter and Soviet General Secretary Leonid Brezhnev sign the Strategic Arms Limitation Talks (SALT II) treaty, June 18, 1979, in Vienna (Austria). Zbigniew Brzeziński is directly behind President Carter.

== After power ==
Brzeziński left office concerned about the internal division within the Democratic party, arguing that the dovish McGovernite wing would send the Democrats into permanent minority. Ronald Reagan invited him to stay on as his National Security Adviser, but Brzeziński declined, feeling that the new president needed a fresh perspective on which to build his foreign policy. He had mixed relations with the Reagan administration. On the one hand, he supported it as an alternative to the Democrats' pacifism. On the other hand, he also criticized it as seeing foreign policy in overly black-and-white terms.

By the 1980s, Brzeziński argued that the general crisis of the Soviet Union foreshadowed communism's end.

He remained involved in Polish affairs, critical of the imposition of martial law in Poland in 1981, and more so of the Western European acquiescence to its imposition in the name of stability. Brzeziński briefed U.S. vice president George H. W. Bush before his 1987 trip to Poland that aided in the revival of the Solidarity movement.

In 1985, under the Reagan administration, Brzeziński served as a member of the President's Chemical Warfare Commission. From 1987 to 1988, he worked on the U.S. National Security Council–Defense Department Commission on Integrated Long-Term Strategy. From 1987 to 1989 he also served on the President's Foreign Intelligence Advisory Board.

In 1988, Brzeziński was co-chairman of the Bush National Security Advisory Task Force, endorsing Bush for president, and breaking with the Democratic party. Brzeziński published The Grand Failure the same year, predicting the failure of Soviet President Mikhail Gorbachev's reforms, and the collapse of the Soviet Union in a few more decades. He said there were five possibilities for the Soviet Union: successful pluralization, protracted crisis, renewed stagnation, coup (by the KGB or Soviet military), or the explicit collapse of the Communist regime. He called collapse "at this stage a much more remote possibility" than protracted crisis.

He also predicted that the chance of some form of communism existing in the Soviet Union in 2017 was a little more than 50% and that when the end did come it would be "most likely turbulent". Conflicts such as Nagorno-Karabakh crisis and Soviet attempts to reinstate its authority in Lithuania and other republics were much less violent than Brzeziński and other observers anticipated. In the event, the Soviet system collapsed totally after the abortive August coup of 1991 launched against Gorbachev failed.

In 1989, the Communists failed to mobilize support in Poland, and Solidarity swept the general elections. Later the same year, Brzeziński toured Russia and visited a memorial to the Katyn massacre. This served as an opportunity for him to ask the Soviet government to acknowledge the truth about the event, for which he received a standing ovation in the Soviet Academy of Sciences. Ten days later, the Berlin Wall fell, and Soviet-supported governments in Eastern Europe began to totter. Strobe Talbott, one of Brzeziński's long-time critics, conducted an interview with him for TIME magazine entitled "Vindication of a Hardliner".

In 1990, Brzeziński warned against post–Cold War euphoria. He publicly opposed the Gulf War, arguing that the United States would squander the international goodwill it had accumulated by defeating the Soviet Union, and that it could trigger wide resentment throughout the Arab world. He expanded upon these views in his 1992 work Out of Control.

Brzeziński was prominently critical of the Clinton administration's hesitation to intervene against the Serb forces in the Bosnian war. He also began to speak out against Russia's First Chechen War, forming the American Committee for Peace in Chechnya. Wary of a move toward the reinvigoration of Russian power, Brzeziński negatively viewed the succession of former KGB agent Vladimir Putin after Boris Yeltsin. In this vein, he became one of the foremost advocates of NATO expansion. He wrote in 1998 that "Without Ukraine, Russia ceases to be a Eurasian empire." In 1997 he advocated for a "loosely confederated Russia — composed of a European Russia, a Siberian Republic, and a Far Eastern Republic" as a "decentralized Russia would be less susceptible to imperial mobilization". He later came out in support of the 1999 NATO bombing of Serbia during the Kosovo war.

== Later years ==
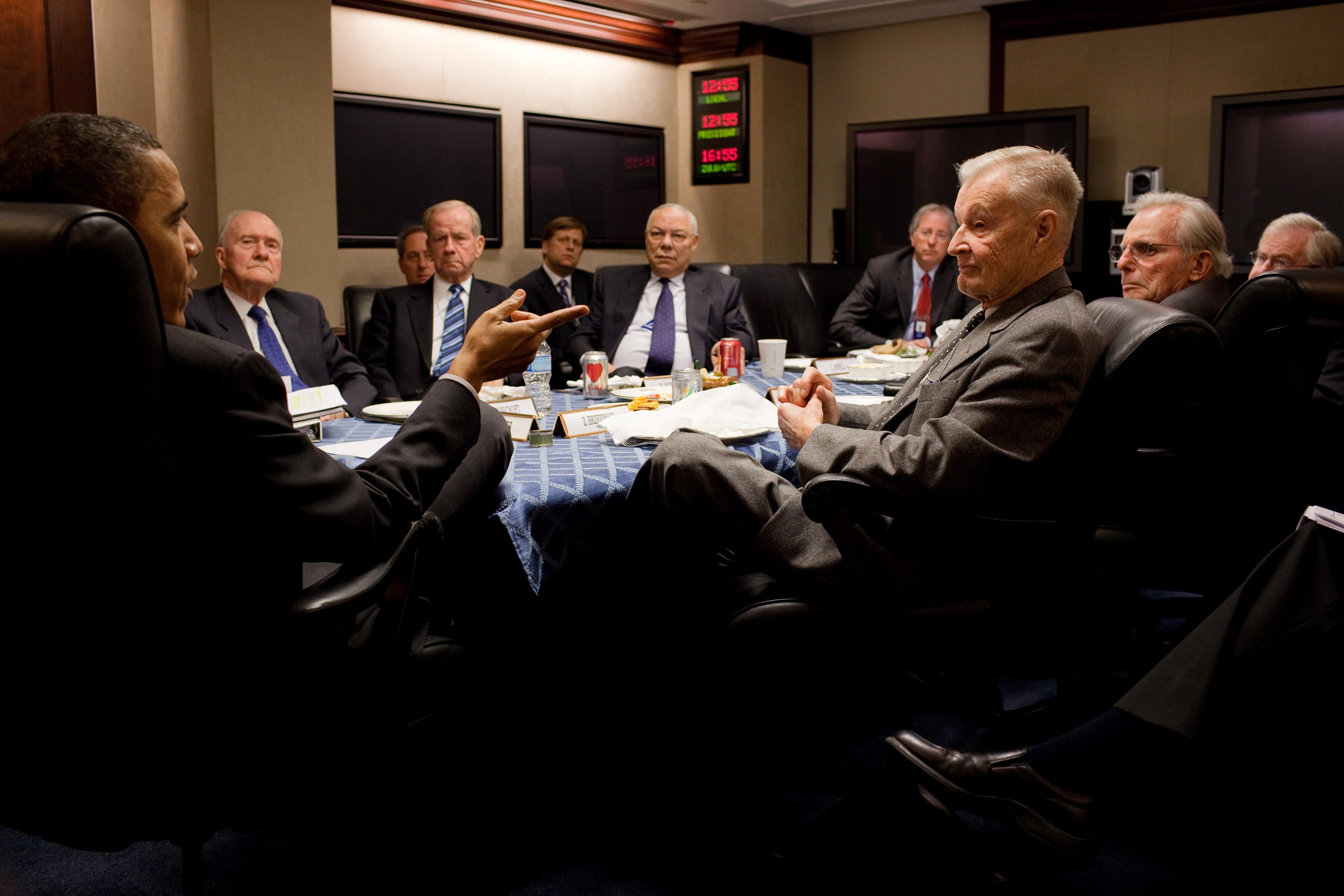
Former National Security Advisers meet with President Barack Obama in 2010. Seated at the table, from left, are Brent Scowcroft, Bud McFarlane, Colin Powell, Dennis Ross, Sandy Berger, Frank Carlucci, and Zbigniew Brzeziński.

After his role as National Security Adviser came to a close, Brzeziński returned to teaching, but remained an influential voice in international relations. Polish politician Radosław Sikorski wrote that to Poles, Brzeziński was considered "our statesman" and his was one of the most revered voices in Poland: "During the decades when Poland was stuck against her will behind the Iron Curtain, he and the Polish pope were the two most important voices for a free Poland abroad. After liberation, he acted as an adviser and champion of the new democracies on their way to rejoining Western institutions."

Though he rose to national prominence as a member of the Carter administration, Brzeziński avoided partisan politics and sometimes later voted Republican. In the 1988 election, he endorsed George H. W. Bush for president over Democrat Michael Dukakis.

Brzeziński argued against the 2003 invasion of Iraq and was outspoken in the then-unpopular opinion that the invasion would be a mistake. As recalled by David Ignatius, "Brzeziński paid a cost in the insular, self-reinforcing world of Washington foreign policy opinion, until it became clear to nearly everyone that he (joined in this Iraq War opposition by Scowcroft) had been right." He later called President George W. Bush's foreign policy "catastrophic."

Brzeziński was a leading critic of the George W. Bush administration's conduct of the war on terror. In 2004, Brzeziński wrote The Choice, which expanded upon his earlier work,The Grand Chessboard (1997), and sharply criticized George W. Bush's foreign policy. In 2007, in a column in The Washington Post, Brzeziński excoriated the Bush administration, arguing that their post-9/11 actions had damaged the reputation of the United States "infinitely greater than any wild dreams entertained by the fanatical perpetrators of the 9/11 attacks" and destroyed any chance of uniting the world to defeat extremism and terrorism. He later stated that he had "visceral contempt" for British Prime Minister Tony Blair, who supported Bush's actions in Iraq. In 2006, he defended John Mearsheimer and Stephen Walt after their arguments about the Israel lobby attracted intense criticism.

In August 2007, Brzeziński endorsed Democratic presidential candidate Barack Obama. He stated that Obama "recognizes that the challenge is a new face, a new sense of direction, a new definition of America's role in the world" and that "What makes Obama attractive to me is that he understands that we live in a very different world where we have to relate to a variety of cultures and people." In September 2007 during a speech on the Iraq war, Obama introduced Brzeziński as "one of our most outstanding thinkers", but some pro-Israel commentators questioned his criticism of the Israel lobby in the United States.

In a September 2009 interview with The Daily Beast, Brzeziński replied to a question about how aggressive President Obama should be in insisting Israel not conduct an air strike on Iran, saying: "We are not exactly impotent little babies. They have to fly over our airspace in Iraq. Are we just going to sit there and watch?" This was interpreted by some supporters of Israel as supporting the downing of Israeli jets by the United States in order to prevent an attack on Iran.

On October 1, 2009, Brzeziński delivered the Waldo Family Lecture on International Relations at Old Dominion University in Norfolk, Virginia. In 2011, Brzeziński supported the NATO intervention against the forces of Muammar Gaddafi in the Libyan Civil War, calling non-intervention "morally dubious" and "politically questionable".

In early 2012, Brzeziński expressed disappointment and said he was confused by some of Obama's actions, such as the decision to send 2,500 U.S. troops to Australia, but supported him for re-election.

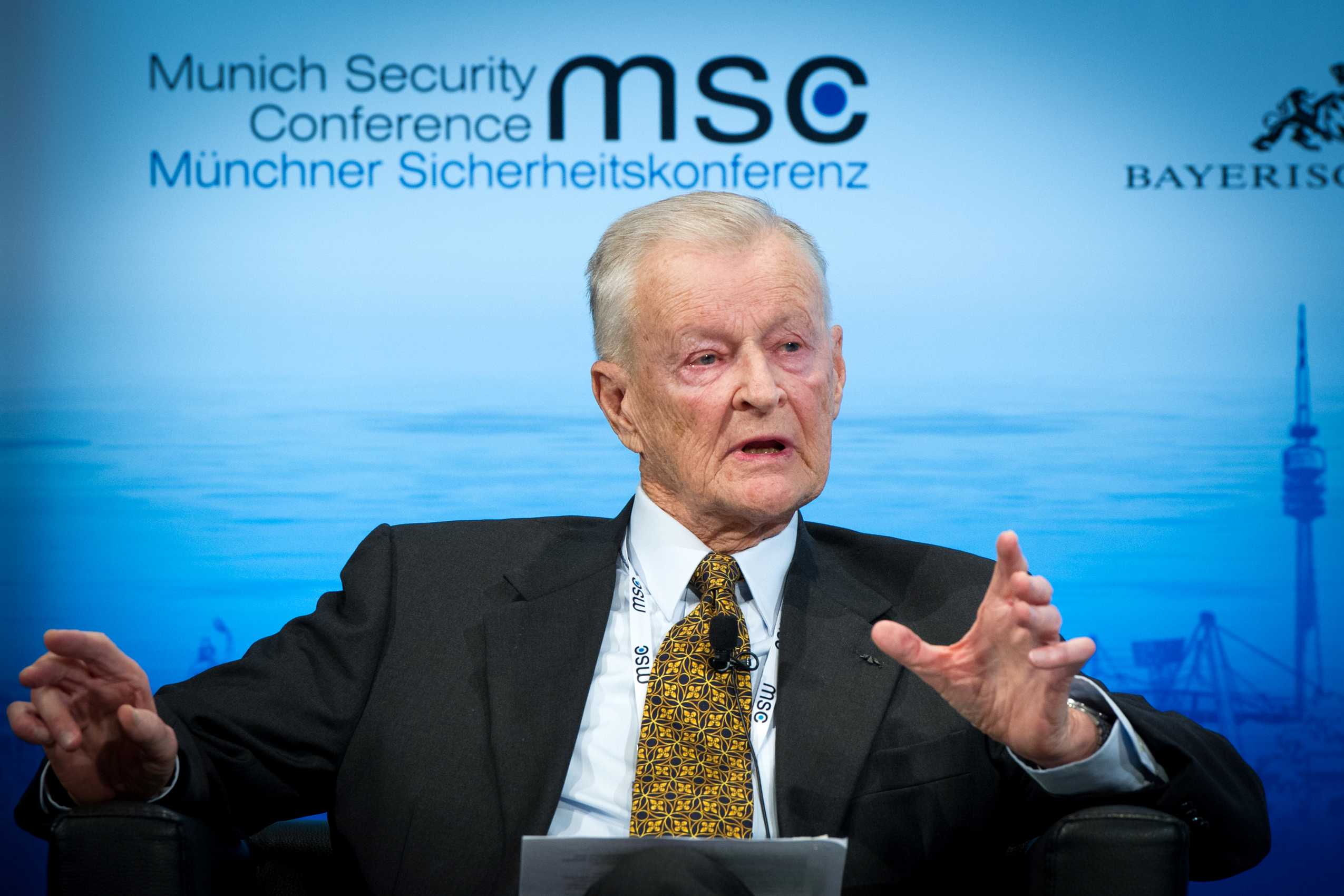
Zbigniew Brzeziński at the Munich Security Conference, 2014

On March 3, 2014, between the February 22 ousting of Ukraine President Viktor Yanukovych and the March 16, Crimean referendum, Brzeziński authored an op-ed piece for The Washington Post entitled "What is to be done? Putin's aggression in Ukraine needs a response." He led with a link on Russian aggression; he compared Russian President Vladimir Putin's "thuggish tactics in seizing Crimea" and "thinly camouflaged invasion" to Adolf Hitler's occupation of the Sudetenland in 1938, and characterized Putin as a cartoon Benito Mussolini, but stopped well short of advocating that the U.S. go to war. Rather, he suggested that NATO should be put on high alert and recommended "to avert miscalculations". He explicitly stated that reassurances be given to "Russia that it is not seeking to draw Ukraine into NATO."

According to Ignatius and Sikorski, Brzeziński was "deeply troubled" by the election of Donald Trump as president of the United States and worried over the future. Two days after the election, on November 10, 2016, Brzeziński warned of "coming turmoil in the nation and the world" in a brief speech after he was awarded the Medal for Distinguished Public Service from the Department of Defense. On May 4, 2017, he sent out his final Tweet, saying, "Sophisticated US leadership is the sine qua non of a stable world order. However, we lack the former while the latter is getting worse."

Piotr Pietrzak argued that "Brzeziński never trusted Putin and saw him as the post-Soviet man, a product of Soviet imperialist indoctrination, who felt deeply humiliated by how the Soviet Union and the Warsaw Pact collapsed, but he predicted the escalation of the situation in the East long before Putin took power and much earlier than most of us, possibly because his geopolitical insights were strongly influenced by the work of Alfred Thayer Mahan, Halford J. Mackinder, Nickolas J. Spykman, and Friedrich Ratzel.".

Pietrzak also suggested that "Although Zbigniew Brzeziński is dead, his work is very much alive; the Biden administration follows Brzeziński's geostrategic blueprint, which supports Ukraine militarily, logistically, diplomatically, and politically. Zbigniew Brzeziński's son Mark Brzeziński serves as the United States Ambassador to Poland and helps his superiors implement his father's geostrategic vision on the ground thanks to which the Ukrainian army is still standing and is capable of not only repelling the Russian offensive but actually launching a successful counter-offensive. The question is what constitutes the Brzeziński Doctrine today? Would Brzeziński see Ukraine as a potential NATO member or a frozen buffer zone between the transatlantic community and an increasingly assertive, hawkish, and unpredictable Russian giant?".

== Personal life ==
Zbigniew Brzeziński was married to Czech-American sculptor Emilie Benešová (grand-niece of the second Czechoslovak president, Edvard Beneš), with whom he had three children. His elder son, Ian (b. 1963), is a Senior Fellow in the International Security Program and is on the Atlantic Council's Strategic Advisors Group. Ian also served as Deputy Assistant Secretary of Defense for Europe and NATO (2001–2005) and was a principal at Booz Allen Hamilton. His younger son, Mark (b. 1965), is a lawyer who served on President Clinton's National Security Council as an expert on Russia and Southeastern Europe, and has served as the U.S. ambassador to Sweden (2011–2015) and Poland (2022–2025). His daughter, Mika (b. 1967), is a television news presenter and co-host of the weekday morning program, Morning Joe, where she provides regular commentary and reads the news headlines for the program.

He was deeply Roman Catholic.

== Public life ==
Zbigniew Brzeziński was a member of the Atlantic Council and the National Endowment for Democracy. At the time of his death, he was a member of the Council on Foreign Relations and the International Honorary Council of the European Academy of Diplomacy.

He was also referred to by the nickname "Zbig".

== Film appearances ==
Zbigniew Brzeziński appeared as himself in several documentary films and TV series, such as: the 1997 film Eternal Memory: Voices from the Great Terror, directed by David Pultz; Episodes 17 (Good Guys, Bad Guys), 19 (Freeze) and 20 (Soldiers of God) of the 1998 CNN series Cold War produced by Jeremy Isaacs; the 2009 documentary Back Door Channels: The Price of Peace; and the 2014 Polish biographical film Strateg (The Strategist) directed by Katarzyna Kolenda-Zaleska and produced by TVN. The 2014 Polish film Jack Strong features Krzysztof Pieczyński as Zbigniew Brzeziński.

== Death ==
Zbigniew Brzeziński died at Inova Fairfax Hospital in Falls Church, Virginia, on May 26, 2017, at the age of 89. His funeral was held June 9 at the Cathedral of St. Matthew in Washington, D.C. Former President Carter and former Secretary of State Madeleine Albright were among those who gave eulogies, while attendees included international diplomats and emissaries; journalists Carl Bernstein, Chuck Todd and David Ignatius; 100-year-old Gen. Edward Rowny; former National Security Adviser Susan E. Rice; and former National Security Advisor, Lt. Gen. H. R. McMaster.

"If I could choose my seatmate, it would be Dr. Zbigniew Brzeziński", Carter said of his international flights on Air Force One. Former National Security Advisor Henry Kissinger, aged 94, was unable to attend, but a note he sent during the eulogy said: "The world is an emptier place without Zbigniew Brzeziński pushing the limits of his insights."

== Honors ==
- (United States) Presidential Medal of Freedom, 1981
- (Czech Republic) Grand Cross of the Order of Tomáš Garrigue Masaryk, 1998
- (Poland) Order of the White Eagle, 1995
- (Slovakia) Second Class of the Cross of the President of the Slovak Republic, 2002
- Grand Officer of the Order of the Star of Romania, 2006
- (Poland) Honorary citizenship of the City of Gdańsk, 2002
- (Latvia) Grand Officer of the Order of the Three Stars, 2007

=== Honorary degrees ===
Location	Date	School	Degree
New York (state)	1979	Fordham University	Doctorate
Massachusetts	June 9, 1986	Williams College	Doctor of Law (LL.D)
Poland	1990	John Paul II Catholic University of Lublin	Doctorate
Lithuania	1998	Vilnius University	Doctorate
Azerbaijan	November 7, 2003	Baku State University	Doctorate

== Works ==
=== Major works by Brzezinski ===
- The Permanent Purge: Politics in Soviet Totalitarianism. Cambridge: Harvard University Press, 1956. ISBN 978-0674732674.
- Soviet Bloc: Unity and Conflict. Cambridge: Harvard University Press, 1967. ISBN 978-0674825451.
- Between Two Ages: America's Role in the Technetronic Era. New York: Viking Press, 1970. ISBN 978-0313234989.
- Power and Principle: Memoirs of the National Security Adviser, 1977–1981. New York: Farrar, Straus, Giroux, 1983. ISBN 978-0374236632.
- Game Plan: A Geostrategic Framework for the Conduct of the U.S.-Soviet Contest. Boston: Atlantic Monthly Press, 1986. ISBN 978-0871130846.
- Grand Failure: The Birth and Death of Communism in the Twentieth Century. New York: Collier Books, 1990. ISBN 978-0020307303.
- Out of Control: Global Turmoil on the Eve of the 21st Century. New York: Collier Books, 1993. ISBN 978-0684826363.
- The Grand Chessboard: American Primacy and Its Geostrategic Imperatives. New York: Basic Books, 1997. ISBN 0465027253. Translated and published in nineteen languages.
- The Choice: Global Domination or Global Leadership. New York: Basic Books, 2004. ISBN 978-0465008001.
- Second Chance: Three Presidents and the Crisis of American Superpower. New York: Basic Books, 2007. ISBN 978-0465002528.
- America and the World: Conversations on the Future of American Foreign Policy. New York: Basic Books, 2008. ISBN 978-0465015016.
- Strategic Vision: America and the Crisis of Global Power. New York: Basic Books, 2012. ISBN 978-0465029549.

=== Other books and monographs ===
- Russo-Soviet Nationalism (thesis). Montreal, Quebec: McGill University (1950).
- Political Control in the Soviet Army: A Study on Reports by Former Soviet Officers. Studies on the USSR, no. 6. New York: Research Program on the USSR (1954). OCLC 1743232.
- Totalitarian Dictatorship and Autocracy, with Carl J. Friedrich. Cambridge: Harvard University Press (1956). OCLC 654233383.
- Ideology and Power in Soviet Politics. New York: Praeger (1962).
- Political Power: USA/USSR, with Samuel Huntington. New York: Viking Press (April 1963). ISBN 0670563188.
- Alternative to Partition: For a Broader Conception of America's Role in Europe. Atlantic Policy Studies, New York: McGraw-Hill (1965).
- International Politics in the Technetronic Era. Volume 1 of Research Papers series, Tokyo Jōchi Daigaku Institute of International Relations. Sofia University Press (1971). 34 p.
- The Fragile Blossom: Crisis and Change in Japan. New York: Harper and Row (1972). ISBN 0060104686.
- American Security in an Interdependent World, with P. Edward Haley. Rowman & Littlefield (September 1988). ISBN 0819170844.
- In Quest of National Security, with Marin Strmecki. Boulder, Colorado: Westview Press (September 1988). ISBN 0813305756.
- The Soviet Political System: Transformation or Degeneration. Irvington Publishers (August 1993). ISBN 0829035729.
- Zbigniew Brzeziński, Bibliografia i Rysunki [Zbigniew Brzeziński, Bibliography and Drawings]. Łódź: Correspondance des arts (1993).
- Russia and the Commonwealth of Independent States: Documents, Data, and Analysis, with Paige Sullivan. Armonk: M. E. Sharpe (1996). ISBN 1563246376.
- The Geostrategic Triad: Living with China, Europe, and Russia. Washington, D.C.: Center for Strategic & International Studies (December 2000). ISBN 089206384X.

=== Book contributions ===
- "After Srebrenica." (August 7, 1995). In: The Black Book of Bosnia: The Consequences of Appeasement, by the writers and editors of The New Republic. Edited by Nader Mousavizadeh. Afterword by Leon Wieseltier. New York: BasicBooks (1996), pp. 153–157. ISBN 978-0465098354.

=== Selected articles and essays ===
- "Peaceful Engagement in Eastern Europe", with William Griffith. Foreign Affairs, vol. 39, no. 4 (Spring 1961), p. 647. doi:10.2307/20029518. JSTOR 20029518.
- "Cincinnatus and the Apparatchik", with Samuel P. Huntington. World Politics, vol. 16, no. 1 (October 1963), pp. 52–78. doi:10.2307/2009251. JSTOR 2009251.
- "The Implications of Change for United States Foreign Policy." Department of State Bulletin, vol. LVII (57), no. 1462 [8255] (July 3, 1967), pp. 19–23. U.S. Department of State.
- "U.S. Foreign Policy: The Search for Focus." Foreign Affairs, vol. 51, no. 4 (July 1973), pp. 708–727. doi:10.2307/20038014. JSTOR 20038014.
- "A Geostrategy for Eurasia." Foreign Affairs, vol. 76, no. 5 (September/October 1997), pp. 50–64.
- "Russia Would Gain by Losing Chechnya." New York Times (November 1999), p. A35.
- "Balancing the East, Upgrading the West; U.S. Grand Strategy in an Age of Upheaval." Foreign Affairs, vol. 91, no. 1 (January/February 2012), pp. 97–104.
- "Toward a Global Realignment." American Interest, vol. 11, no. 6 (July/August 2016). Full issue.

=== Reports ===
- Democracy Must Work: A Trilateral Agenda for the Decade, with David Owen, Michael Stewart, Carol Hansen, and Saburo Okita. Trilateral Commission (June 1984). ISBN 0814761615.
- Differentiated Containment: U.S. Policy Toward Iran and Iraq, with Brent Scowcroft and Richard W. Murphy. Council on Foreign Relations Press (July 1997). ISBN 0876092024.
- The United States and the Persian Gulf, with Anthony Lake, F. Gregory, and III Gause. Council on Foreign Relations Press (December 2001). ISBN 0876092911.
- Iran: Time for a New Approach, with Robert M. Gates. Council on Foreign Relations Press (February 2003). ISBN 0876093454.

== Citations ==
Political offices
Preceded by Brent Scowcroft	National Security Advisor; 1977–1981	Succeeded by Richard Allen
