= Ian Brzezinski =

US foreign policy and military affairs expert (b. 1963)

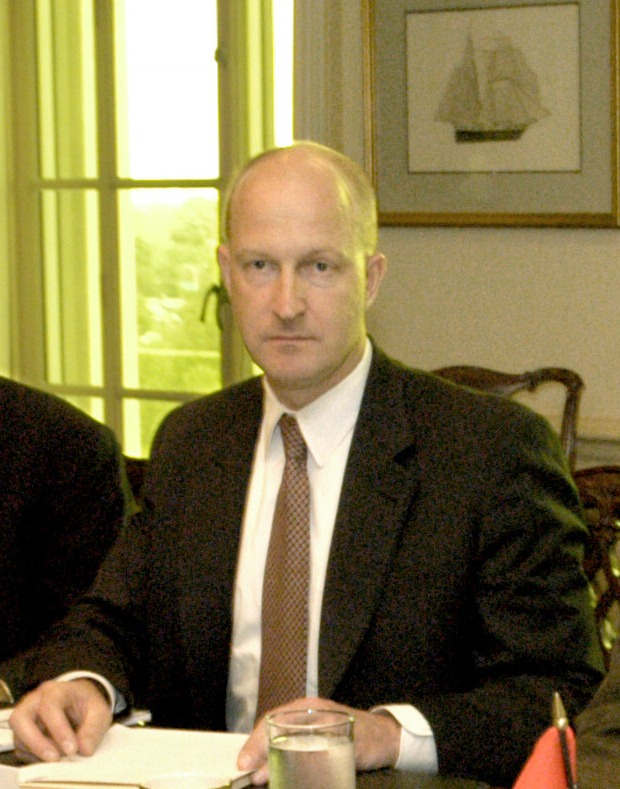
- Brzezinski in 2004
- Born: Ian Joseph Brzezinski; December 23, 1963 (age 62)
- Education: Williams College
- Occupation: Foreign policy expert
- Political party: Republican
- Spouse: Ginny Flynn-Brzezinski
- Children: 2
- Parents: Zbigniew Brzezinski (father); Emilie Benes (mother)
- Relatives: Mark Brzezinski (brother); Mika Brzezinski (sister); Matthew Brzezinski (cousin)

Ian Joseph Brzezinski (born December 23, 1963) is an American foreign policy and military affairs expert.

He served as Deputy Assistant Secretary of Defense for Europe and NATO Policy from 14 May 2001 to 20 January 2005, under President George W. Bush.

== Biography ==
Ian Brzezinski attended Langley High School in McLean, Virginia and in 1986 graduated from Williams College. He was a Support Analyst/Information Assistant at the National Security Council in 1986–1987.

He served as a member of the Policy Planning Staff in the Department of Defense in 1991–1993, and was also a consultant to the Center for Naval Analysis in 1991–1992.

In 1993–1994, Brzezinski became a volunteer advisor to the government of Ukraine, where he assisted Ukraine's National Security Council, Foreign Ministry, Defense Ministry and Parliament.

He returned to the United States in 1995, and became Legislative Assistant for National Security Affairs to Senator William Roth. In 2000, he became a Senior Professional Staff Member for the U.S. Senate Committee on Foreign Relations.

He served as Deputy Assistant Secretary of Defense for Europe and NATO Policy in 2001–2005.

After leaving the Defense Department, Brzezinski became a Principal at the consulting firm Booz Allen Hamilton, Inc., providing policy and technical advice to U.S. combatant commands and foreign clients. He left Booz Allen Hamilton after five years, and now heads the Brzezinski Group, which provides similar services: " ... a strategic advisory firm serving U.S. and international commercial clients in the financial, energy, and defense sectors. The Brzezinski Group assists them navigate geopolitical developments, develop and execute market entry and opportunity capture strategies, and manage relationships with government entities."

He is also a member of the Strategic Advisors Group at the Atlantic Council; in 2010 he was named a Senior Fellow in the council's Brent Scowcroft Center on International Security.

Brzezinski is a frequent contributor to the American press on foreign policy issues.

== Honors ==
For his public service, Brzezinski has been awarded

- Department of Defense Medal for Distinguished Public Service
- Order of the Lithuanian Grand Duke Gediminas
- Award of Ministry of Defence of Latvia
- Romanian Medal for National Service, Order of Commander
- Order of Merit, Republic of Poland, Officer Class.

== Family ==
Ian Brzezinski is the son of foreign-policy expert Zbigniew Brzezinski and sculptor Emilie Benes Brzezinski, and the brother of American lawyer and foreign policy expert Mark Brzezinski and American television news journalist Mika Brzezinski. He is first cousin of Matthew Brzezinski. Brzezinski's maternal grandfather was Edvard Beneš, who served as president and prime minister of Czechoslovakia.

He is married to Ginny Flynn-Brzezinski and has two children.

== Publications ==
- U.S. Policy Toward Northeastern Europe: Report of an Independent Task Force. Council on Foreign Relations Press, April 1999. ISBN 0-87609-259-8
