= Second Chance (Brzezinski book) =

2007 non-fiction book

Second Chance: Three Presidents and the Crisis of American Superpower
- Author: Zbigniew Brzezinski
- Language: English
- Subject: United States -- Foreign relations -- 1989-
- Publisher: Basic Books
- Publication date: May 5, 2007
- Media type: Print (hardcover)
- Pages: 240 pp (first edition)
- ISBN: 0-465-00252-8
- OCLC: 76871416
- Dewey Decimal: 327.73 22
- LC Class: JZ1480 .B69 2007

Second Chance: Three Presidents and the Crisis of American Superpower is a 2007 book by Zbigniew Brzezinski, who was President Carter's National Security advisor and a scholar of American foreign policy as a professor at the School of Advanced International Studies at Johns Hopkins University. The book discusses the 15 years of American foreign policy where the U.S., emerging as the "victor" in the Cold War, has been the lone "superpower." Brzezinski writes about how United States presidents George H. W. Bush, Bill Clinton, and George W. Bush have demonstrated leadership and wielded power throughout a decade and a half as the leaders of a virtually unchallenged world power.

== Synopsis ==
Brzezinski sets the book up by giving his history of the Cold War, and how it was a combination of presidents, not just Ronald Reagan, and international events that lead to the demise of the Soviet system. He describes the two emerging views of the world as the "Globalization" view and the "Neoconservative" view. In each of the next three chapters, he describes the president, his foreign policy team, and the events and people which shaped that president's foreign policy. He focuses on three main factors, the "Atlantic Alliance," nuclear non-proliferation, and the Israeli/Palestinian conflict, but discusses other foreign policy issues (e.g. the environment, emerging South American nationalism, and the rise of China and India).

In the middle three chapters, "The Original Sin" (Bush I), "The Impotence of Good Intentions" (Clinton), and "Catastrophic Leadership" (Bush II), he compares the presidents and the decisions made or not made by their foreign policy teams. He is equally critical of Bush I and Clinton and rates them nearly the same, but with different strengths and weaknesses. He is harshest on the Bush II administration, particularly with regard to its treatment of the Atlantic Alliance, the Middle East, and the environment.

In the chapter titled "After 2008," Dr. Brzezinski suggests the next president must strengthen the Atlantic Alliance; reform lobbying; demonstrate leadership in the Middle East, particularly with regard to Israel/Palestine; foster consensus on the environment; and formulate a better strategy with regard to the emergence of China both as a world power and a force in the Middle East. He warns that America will have a second chance after 2008, but there definitely won't be a third chance.
