= Mark Brzezinski =

American lawyer and diplomat (born 1965)

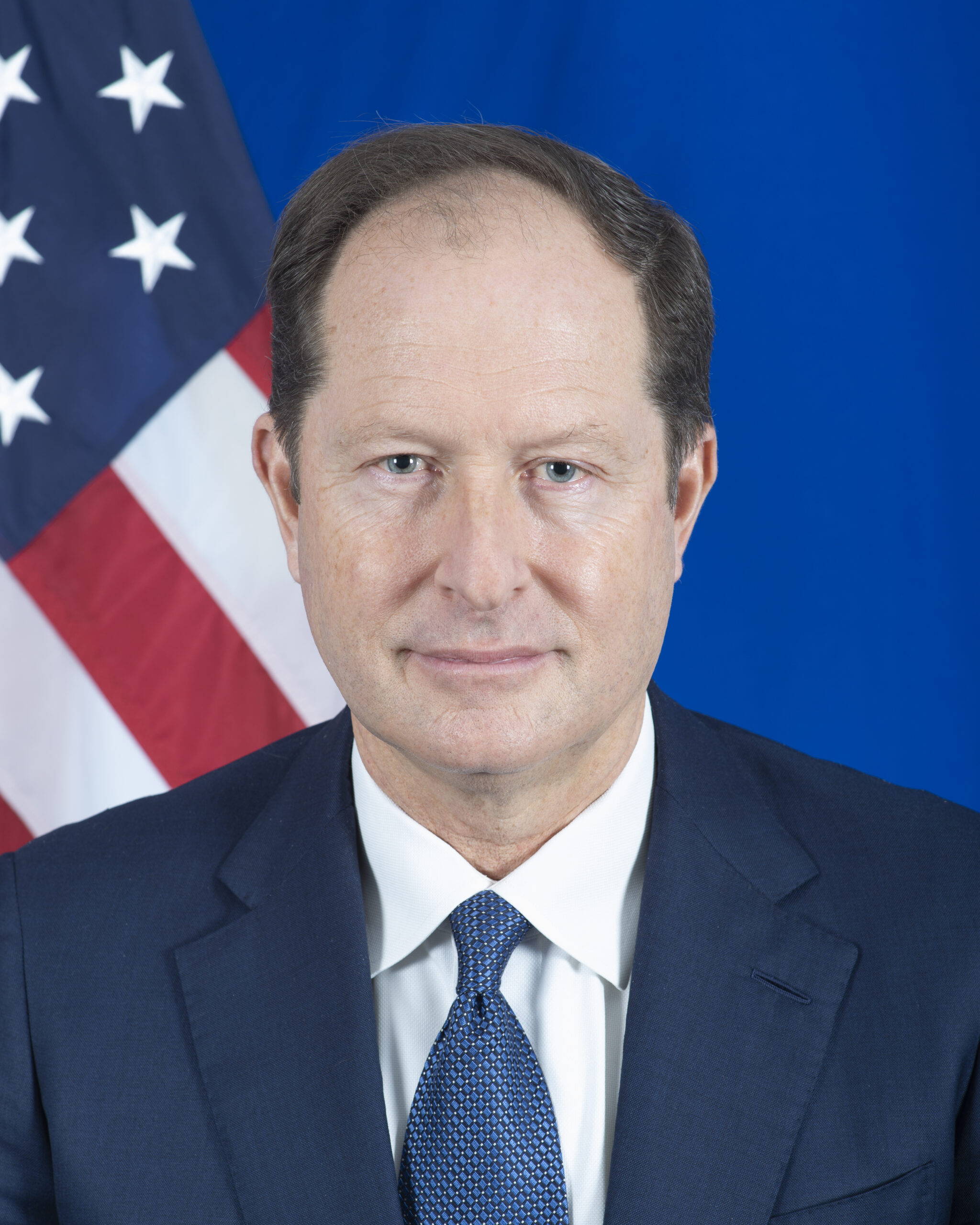
- Official portrait, 2022

United States Ambassador to Poland
- In office February 22, 2022 – January 20, 2025
- President: Joe Biden
- Preceded by: Georgette Mosbacher
- Succeeded by: Tom Rose

United States Ambassador to Sweden
- In office November 24, 2011 – July 1, 2015
- President: Barack Obama
- Preceded by: Matthew Barzun
- Succeeded by: Azita Raji

Personal details
- Born: Mark Francis Brzezinski; April 7, 1965 (age 61)
- Party: Democratic
- Spouse(s): Carolyn M. Campbell (div.); Natalia Brzezinski (div.)
- Parent(s): Zbigniew Brzezinski; Emilie Benes Brzezinski
- Relatives: Ian Brzezinski (brother); Mika Brzezinski (sister); Matthew Brzezinski (cousin); Joe Scarborough (brother-in-law)
- Education: Dartmouth College (BA); University of Virginia (JD); St Antony's College, Oxford (DPhil)
- Awards: Officer's Cross of the Order of Merit of the Republic of Poland, Order of the Polar Star, Commander 1st Class

Mark Francis Brzezinski (born April 7, 1965) is an American lawyer who served as the United States Ambassador to Poland from 2022 to 2025. He previously served as the United States Ambassador to Sweden from 2011 to 2015 under President Barack Obama.

The son of Zbigniew Brzezinski, former US National Security Advisor to President Jimmy Carter, Brzezinski attended Dartmouth College, the University of Virginia Law School, and St. Antony's College, Oxford.

== Early life and education ==
Brzezinski is the son of Emilie Benes Brzezinski and Polish-born former National Security Advisor Zbigniew Brzezinski, and the grandson of Polish diplomat Tadeusz Brzeziński. His mother is the grandniece of former Czechoslovak president Edvard Beneš. His sister is Mika Brzezinski, co-host of the morning talk show Morning Joe, and his brother is military expert Ian Brzezinski. He is also first cousin of author Matthew Brzezinski.

Brzezinski graduated from Dartmouth College with a Bachelor of Arts in government, earned a Juris Doctor from the University of Virginia Law School, and holds a Doctor of Philosophy in political science from Oxford University. He also earned a Fulbright Scholarship to study the Constitutional Tribunal of the Republic of Poland.

== Career ==
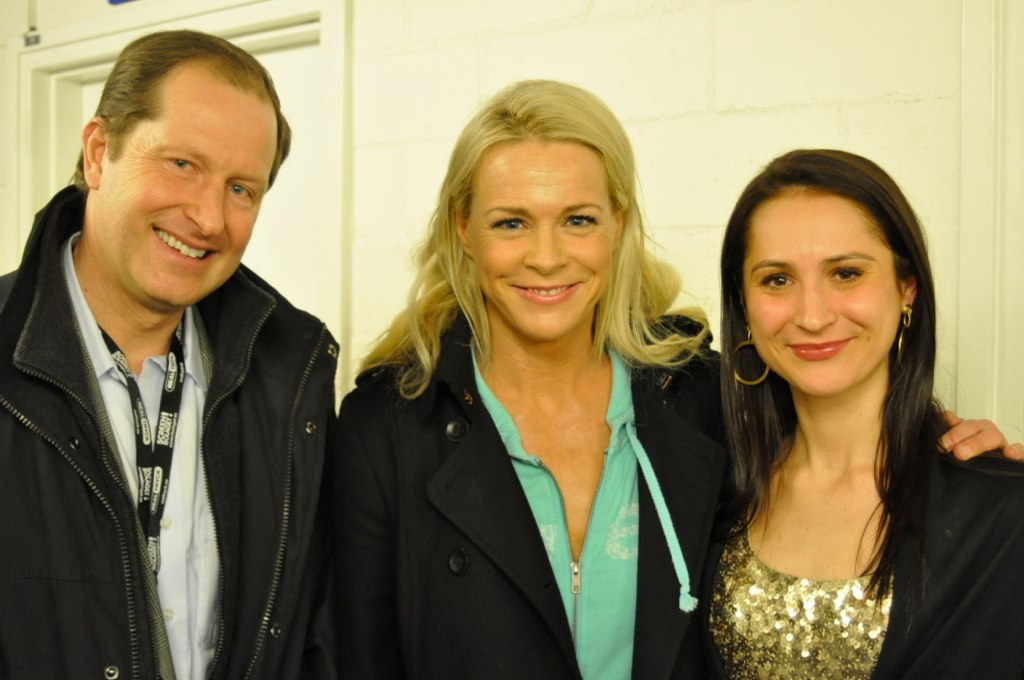
Ambassador Brzezinski (left) and his then wife Natalia Brzezinski (right) with Swedish opera singer Malena Ernman (center)

Brzezinski was a corporate and securities associate at Hogan & Hartson LLP in Washington, D.C. from 1996-1999. From 1999-2001, Brzezinski served in the Clinton administration as a director of Russian/Eurasian affairs and director of Southeast European affairs of the National Security Council at the White House. In that capacity, he was White House coordinator for U.S. democracy and rule of law assistance programs for the region.

Brzezinski was a foreign policy advisor to the presidential campaign of Barack Obama, and was later appointed Ambassador to Sweden by Obama.

=== Ambassador to Poland ===
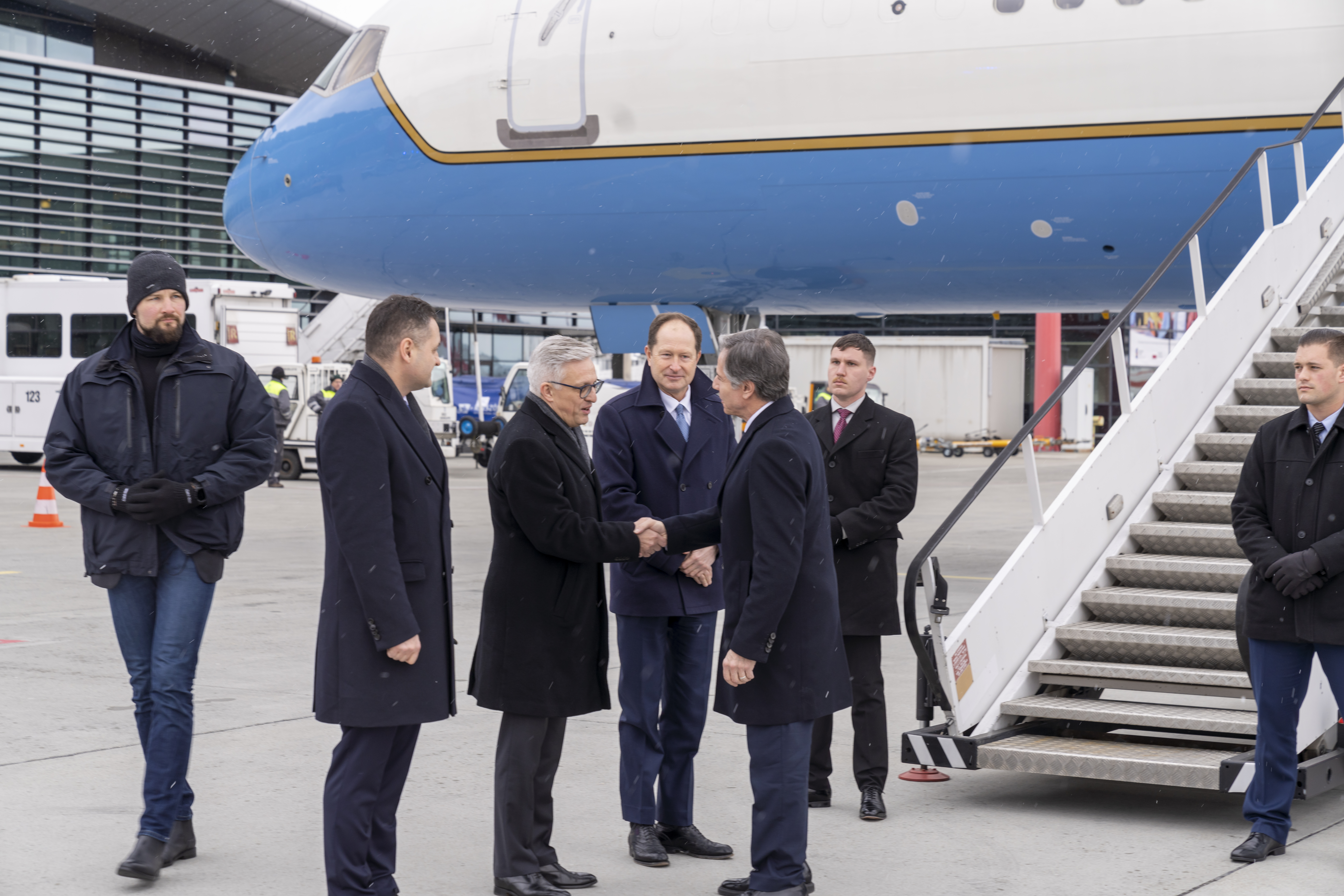
Brzezinski greets U.S. Secretary of State Antony Blinken in Rzeszów, Poland on March 5, 2022

On May 26, 2021, The New York Times reported that President Joe Biden was considering nominating Brzezinski to be the United States Ambassador to Poland. Brzezinski was officially nominated on August 4. On August 9, 2021, his nomination was sent to the Senate. Hearings on his nomination were held before the Senate Foreign Relations Committee on December 1, 2021. His nomination was favorably reported by the committee on December 15, 2021, and was confirmed by the Senate on December 18, 2021 by voice vote.

Brzezinski was sworn in as the United States Ambassador to Poland on January 19, 2022 by Vice President Kamala Harris. He presented his credentials to President Andrzej Duda on February 22, 2022.

=== Career after diplomatic service ===
After the end of his tenure as U.S. ambassador to Poland in January 2025, Brzezinski co-founded Brzezinski Global Strategies, a Washington, D.C.-based firm providing geopolitical and strategic advisory services with a focus on transatlantic relations and Central, Eastern, and Northern Europe. He serves as the firm's president and chief executive officer.

On February 1, 2025, Brzezinski joined the supervisory board of Pelion S.A., a Polish company operating in pharmaceutical distribution and healthcare services.

On April 14, 2025, he joined the Board of Strategic Advisors of UNIMOT, a Polish energy group. The advisory board addresses issues including energy security, geopolitics, strategic management and international expansion.

== Awards ==
In 2007 President of Poland Lech Kaczyński decorated him with Officer's Cross of the Order of Merit of the Republic of Poland. The order was awarded "for outstanding contributions to the development of Polish-American relations and for promoting a positive image of Poland in the world".

In 2018, he received the Order of the Polar Star, Commander 1st Class.

== Personal life ==
He is currently divorced. His first wife was Carolyn M. Campbell, a lawyer. His second wife, from 2008 until 2022, was Natalia Brzezinski, née Lopatniuk.

Diplomatic posts
Preceded by Matthew Barzun	United States Ambassador to Sweden; 2011–2015	Succeeded by Azita Raji
Preceded by Georgette Mosbacher	United States Ambassador to Poland; 2022–2025	Succeeded by Tom Rose
