= All Things at Once =

2010 memoir

All Things at Once is a 2010 memoir by American television host Mika Brzezinski with American journalist Daniel Paisner, published by Berkley Prime Crime.It describes Brzezinski's time as a journalist. She decided to write the book upon seeing astonishment after advising women in early portions of their career paths that they should have children as soon as they can.

In January 2010, the book became a New York Times Best Seller.

== Reception ==
Kirkus Reviews described the book as "intriguing".

Publishers Weekly stated that Brzezinski's advice to female readers in regards to career and children is "a refreshingly pragmatic approach".
