= Emilie Beneš Brzezinski =

Czech-American sculptor (1932–2022)

Emilie Benešová–Brzezińska
- Born: Emilie Anna Benešová; January 21, 1932; Geneva, Switzerland
- Died: July 22, 2022 (aged 90); Jupiter, Florida, U.S.
- Education: Wellesley College, Massachusetts
- Known for: Sculpture
- Spouse: Zbigniew Brzeziński (m. 1961; died 2017)
- Children: Ian; Mark; Mika

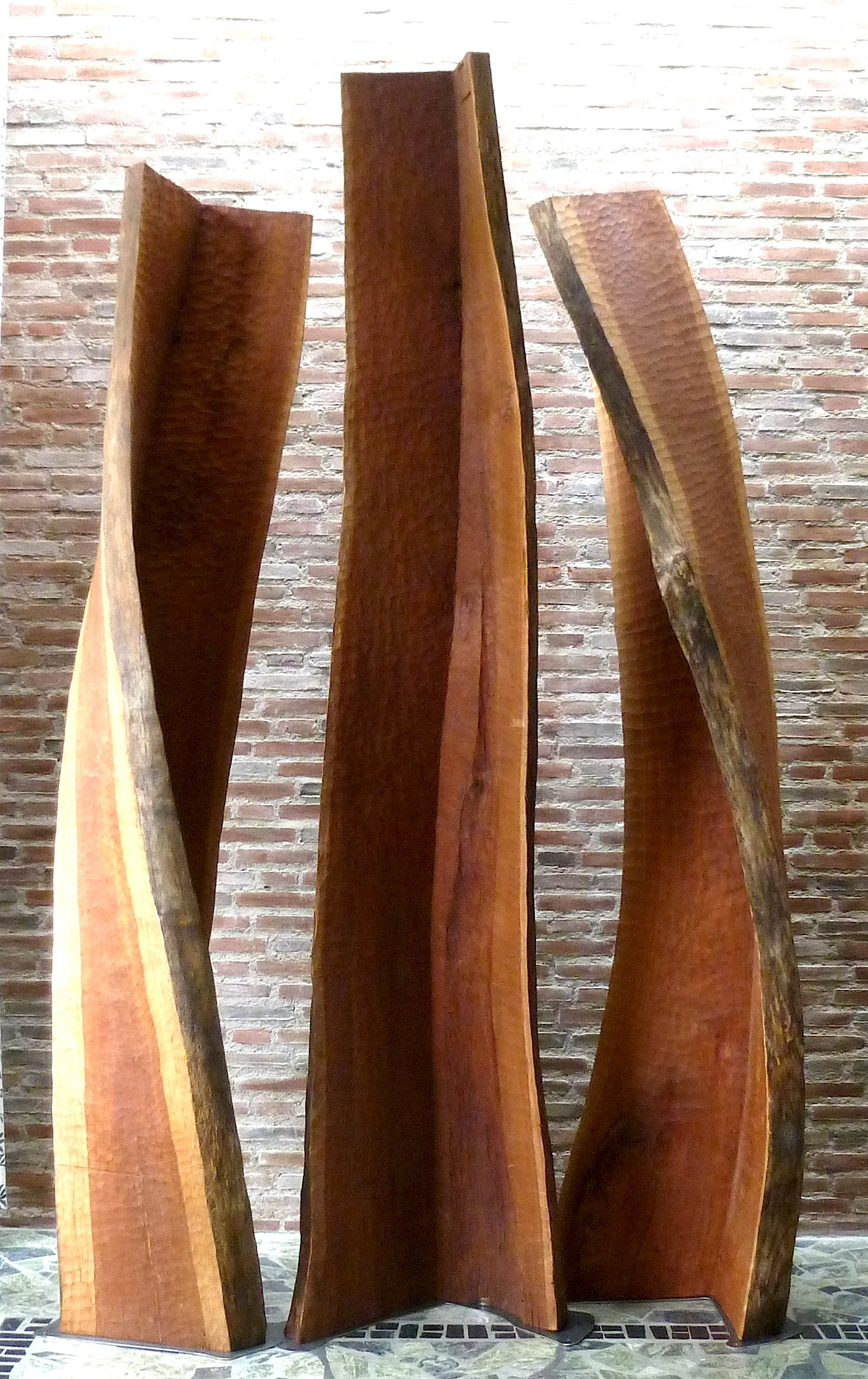
Cherry Pantomime

Emilie Benešová–Brzezińska (born Emilie Anna Benešová; January 21, 1932 – July 22, 2022) was a Swiss-American sculptor and the wife of Zbigniew Brzeziński.

== Education and career ==
Emilie Benešová was born in Geneva, Switzerland. She earned a fine arts degree at Wellesley College in Massachusetts, United States. After marrying, she sculpted for 25 years while raising a family, then had her first solo show in 1981 in Washington, D.C.

From the 1980s on, most of her works were in wood. Her monumental 1993 work Lintel, constructed from cut cherry trees and then cast in bronze, is in the collection of Grounds for Sculpture, a 35-acre (140,000 m^{2}) sculpture park and museum in New Jersey. She exhibited in the 2003 Florence Biennale and participated by invitation in the 2005 Vancouver International Sculpture Biennale. The Kreeger Museum had an exhibition of her work in 2014.

== Personal life ==
Václav Edvard Beneš, a mathematician, was her brother. Shortly after graduating from Wellesley, Emilie Benešová, herself a relative of Czechoslovakia's former president Edvard Beneš, married Polish-born emigrant turned naturalized citizen Zbigniew Brzeziński, a political scientist who served as an adviser to Jimmy Carter while US president. The Brzeziński's had three children. Their oldest son, Ian Brzeziński, served as Deputy Assistant Secretary of Defense for Europe and NATO Policy in 2001–2005. Their second son, Mark Brzeziński, was the U.S. Ambassador to Poland from 2022 to 2025. Their youngest child, Mika Brzezińska, is a co-host of Morning Joe on MSNBC.

Emilie Benešová–Brzezińska died on July 22, 2022, at the age of 90.
