= List of active non-governmental organizations of national minorities, indigenous and diasporas =

This is a list of notable active non-governmental organizations of national minorities, indigenous and diasporas.

== International ==
- Assembly of French Citizens Abroad
- Inuit Circumpolar Council
- World Jewish Congress

== Africa ==
- Agoro Community Development Association, Uganda
- Heal The World Movement Nigeria
- Unified Technology & Agricultural Program (UTAPAFRICA)

== Asia ==
=== Israel ===
- A New Dawn in the Negev
- Adalah – The Legal Center for Arab Minority Rights in Israel

=== India ===
- All India Muslim Personal Law Board
- All India Muslim Personal Law Board

=== Pakistan ===
- Hare Rama Foundation Pakistan

== Europe ==
=== Continental ===
- European Centre for Minority Issues
- European Jewish Congress
- High Commissioner on National Minorities
- Minority Rights Group International

=== Austria ===
- The World Congress of the Nations of Georgia

=== Belarus ===
- Union of Poles in Belarus
- Yad Yisroel

=== Belgium ===
- European Roma Information Office

=== Bulgaria ===
- NGO Roma Together

=== Croatia ===
- Alliance of Roma in the Republic of Croatia "Kali Sara"
- Association for Serbian language and literature in the Republic of Croatia
- Serb Democratic Forum
- Serb National Council
- Privrednik
- Prosvjeta

=== Czech Republic ===
- Congress of Poles in the Czech Republic
- International Romani Union

=== France ===
- Conseil Représentatif des Institutions juives de France

=== Germany ===
- Central Council of Jews in Germany
- Congress of Polonia in Germany
- Union of Poles in Germany

=== Hungary ===
- European Roma Rights Centre

=== Lithuania ===
- Association of Poles in Lithuania
- Kaunas Cultural Centre of Various Nations

=== Poland ===
- Kashubian-Pomeranian Association
- Kaszëbskô Jednota

=== Macedonia ===
- Nansen Dialogue Centre Skopje

=== Romania ===
- Romani CRISS

=== Russia ===
- Congress of the Jewish Religious Organizations and Associations in Russia
- Federation of Jewish Communities of Russia
- Federation of Jewish Communities of the CIS
- Russian Jewish Congress

=== Serbia ===
- Bosniac National Council
- Croat National Council
- Department for culture of Croats of Vojvodina

=== Slovakia ===
- Forum Minority Research Institute

=== Ukraine ===
- Association of Polish Culture of the Lviv Land
- Russian Cultural Centre (Lviv)

=== United Kingdom ===
- Board of Deputies of British Jews
- British Tamil Association
- Federation of Poles in Great Britain
- Jewish Community Centre for London
- Jewish Lads' and Girls' Brigade
- Jewish Leadership Council
- London Jewish Forum
- Russian Cultural Centre (London)
- Scottish Council of Jewish Communities
- Worldwide Somali Students & Professionals

== North America ==
=== Canada ===
- Assembly of First Nations
- Association of United Ukrainian Canadians
- Bavarian Schuhplattlers of Edmonton
- Canadian Polish Congress
- Congress of Aboriginal Peoples
- National Congress of Italian Canadians

=== United States ===
- Albanian American Civic League
- Alpha Phi Alpha fraternity
- Alpha Kappa Alpha
- American Polish Advisory Council
- Anti-Defamation League
- Armenian Youth Federation
- Armenian National Institute
- Chechnya Advocacy Network
- Croatian Fraternal Union
- Cultural Survival
- German-American Heritage Foundation of the USA
- German American National Congress
- Irish American Cultural Institute
- Mexican American Political Association
- Mexicans Without Borders
- National Association of Arab-Americans
- National Congress of American Indians
- National Iranian American Council
- National Latino Congreso
- National Pan-Hellenic Council
- Organization of Istanbul Armenians
- Polish American Association
- Polish American Catholic Heritage Committee
- Polish Culture Society of Edmonton
- Polish National Alliance
- Polish Women's Alliance
- Serbian Unity Congress
- Ugandan North American Association (UNAA)
- Ukrainian Congress Committee of America
- Voice of Roma
- Zeta Phi Beta

== South America ==
=== Bolivia ===
- Confederation of Indigenous Peoples of Bolivia

=== Brazil ===
- Coordination of the Indigenous Organizations of the Brazilian Amazon

=== Ecuador ===
- Confederation of Indigenous Nationalities of Ecuador
- Confederation of Indigenous Nationalities of the Ecuadorian Amazon

=== Peru ===
- Coordinator of Indigenous Organizations of the Amazon River Basin
- Interethnic Association for the Development of the Peruvian Rainforest

== Australia and Oceania ==
=== Australia ===
- Executive Council of Australian Jewry
