= CAN =

CAN may refer to:

== Organizations ==
- Andean Community of Nations, a South American trade bloc with Bolivia, Colombia, Ecuador and Peru
- Campus Antiwar Network, an American network of students opposing the occupation of Iraq
- Caja Navarra, a former savings banks in Navarre, Spain
- Chechnya Advocacy Network, an American non-government organization for Chechnya advocacy
- Christian Association of Nigeria, an umbrella organization containing numerous Christian denominations in Nigeria
- Climate Action Network, an international non-governmental network to limit human-induced climate change
- Corporate Angel Network, an American non-profit organization that arranges free air travel for cancer patients
- Cricket Association of Nepal, governing body of Nepali cricket
- Cult Awareness Network, an American anti-cult organization
- Cure Autism Now, a former American organization for autism advocacy
- Cycling Action Network, a New Zealand cycling advocacy group

== Science and medicine ==
- CAN (gene), a human gene
- Calcium ammonium nitrate, a fertilizer
- Ceric ammonium nitrate, an inorganic compound
- Chronic allograft nephropathy, the leading cause of kidney transplant failure

== Computing ==
- Campus area network or corporate area network, a computer network in a limited geographical area
- Cancel character, a precision control character in the C0 control code set
- CAN bus, controller area network bus, a type of microcontroller bus designed for vehicles
- Computer-assisted notetaking, or electronic notetaking
- Content-addressable network, a distributed hash table for P2P
- Copper access node, a network device to provide xDSL signals on telephone lines, a.k.a. DSLAM

== Other uses ==
- Canada (ISO country code, IOC code), a country in North America
- Coupe d'Afrique des Nations (CAN) or Africa Cup of Nations, an association football competition in Africa
- Guangzhou Baiyun International Airport (IATA airport code), the main airport in Guangzhou, Guangdong, China
- Can (band), a German experimental rock band
- Canadian Hot 100, a Billboard chart with the shortcut "CAN"

== See also ==
- Can (disambiguation)
- CANS (disambiguation)
