= Ukrainian Russian =

Ukrainian Russian may refer to:

- Russians in Ukraine
  - Russian language in Ukraine
- Ukrainians in Russia
