= CANS =

CANS may refer to:

- Childhood acute neuropsychiatric symptoms
- Complaints of the arm, neck, and shoulder

== See also ==
- Cans (disambiguation)
- CAN (disambiguation)
