= Can =

Can may refer to:

== Containers ==
- Canning of food and drink
  - Aluminum can
  - Drink can
  - Steel and tin cans
- Trash can
- Oil can
- Petrol can

== Music ==
- Can (band), West Germany, 1968
  - Can (album), 1979
- Can (South Korean band)

== Other uses ==
- Can (name), Turkish and Circassian given name and surname
- can (verb), the modal of possibility in English
- River Can, Essex, England
- Canada (Can.), North America
- Cantoris (can.), side of a church or choir
- Tomato can (sports idiom)

== See also ==
- CAN (disambiguation)
- Cann (disambiguation)
- Cans (disambiguation)
- Kan (disambiguation)
- Can-can (disambiguation)
