= Russians in Ukraine =

Ethnic minority group

Total population
- In the 2001 Ukrainian census, 8,334,100 identified themselves as ethnic Russians (17.3% of the population of Ukraine).

Regions with significant populations
- Donbas; Crimea
- Donetsk Oblast: 1,844,399 (2001)
- Crimea (excluding Sevastopol): 1,180,441 (2001)
- Luhansk Oblast: 991,825 (2001)
- Kharkiv Oblast: 742,025 (2001)
- Dnipropetrovsk Oblast: 627,531 (2001)
- Odesa Oblast: 508,537 (2001)
- Zaporizhzhia Oblast: 476,748 (2001)
- Kyiv: 337,323 (2001)
- Sevastopol: 269,953 (2001)
- Other regions of Ukraine: 1,355,359 (2001)

Languages
- Russian (95.9%, 2001); Ukrainian (54.8%, 2001)

Related ethnic groups
- Slavic people (East Slavs, West Slavs, South Slavs)

Russians constitute the country's largest ethnic minority in Ukraine. This community forms the largest single Russian community outside of Russia in the world. In the 2001 Ukrainian census, 8,334,100 identified themselves as ethnic Russians (17.3% of the population of Ukraine); this is the combined figure for persons originating from outside of Ukraine and the Ukrainian-born population declaring Russian ethnicity.

== Language ==
Russian is the most common first language in the Donbas and Crimea regions of Ukraine and the cities of Kharkiv and Odesa, and a main language in large cities in the eastern and southern portions of the country. The usage and status of the language is the subject of political disputes. Ukrainian is the country's sole state language since the adoption of the 1996 Constitution, which prohibits an official bilingual system at state level but also guarantees the free development, use and protection of Russian and other languages of national minorities. In 2017 a new Law on Education was passed which restricted the use of Russian as a language of instruction. Almost a decade later in 2026, Ukraine has removed Russian from the list of languages to which the provisions of the European Charter for Regional or Minority Languages apply.

== Geography ==
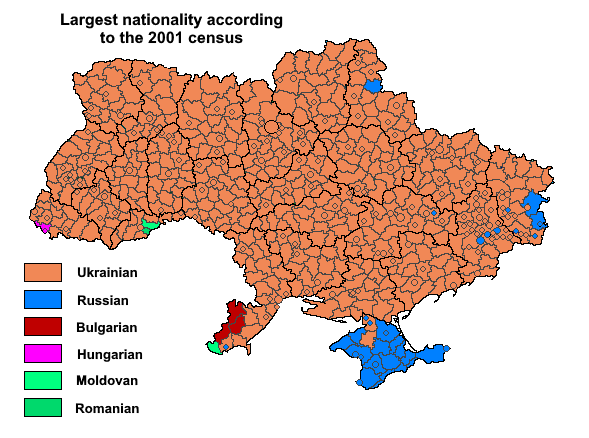
Largest ethnicities in Ukraine's cities and raions, according to the 2001 census. Russians are in blue

Ethnic Russians live throughout Ukraine. They form a notable fraction of the overall population in the east and south, a significant minority in the center, and a smaller minority in the west.

The west and the center of the country feature a higher percentage of Russians in cities and industrial centers and a much smaller percentage in the overwhelmingly Ukrainophone rural areas. Due to the concentration of the Russians in the cities, as well as for historic reasons, most of the largest cities in the center and the south-east of the country (including Kyiv where Russians amount to 13.1% of the population) remained largely Russophone as of 2003. Russians constitute the majority in Crimea (71.7% in Sevastopol and 58.5% in the Autonomous republic of Crimea).

Outside of Crimea, Russians are the largest ethnic group in Donetsk (48.2%) and Makiivka (50.8%) in Donetsk Oblast, Ternivka (52.9%) in Dnipropetrovsk Oblast, Krasnodon (63.3%) and Sverdlovsk (Dovzhansk) (58.7%) and Krasnodon Raion (51.7%) and Stanytsia-Luhanska Raion (61.1%) in Luhansk Oblast, Izmail (43.7%) in Odesa Oblast, Putyvl Raion (51.6%) in Sumy Oblast.

There are two notable sub-ethnic groups of Russians in Ukraine: the Goryuns around Putyvl, and the Lipovans (a group of Old Believers) around Vylkove.

== History ==
=== Early history ===
One of the most prominent Russians in Medieval Ukraine (at that time the Polish–Lithuanian Commonwealth) was Ivan Fyodorov, who published the Ostrog Bible and called himself a Muscovite.

In 1599, Tsar Boris Godunov ordered the construction of Tsareborisov on the banks of Oskol River, the first city and the first fortress in Eastern Ukraine. To defend the territory from Tatar raids the Russians built the Belgorod defensive line (1635–1658), and Ukrainians started fleeing to be under its defense.

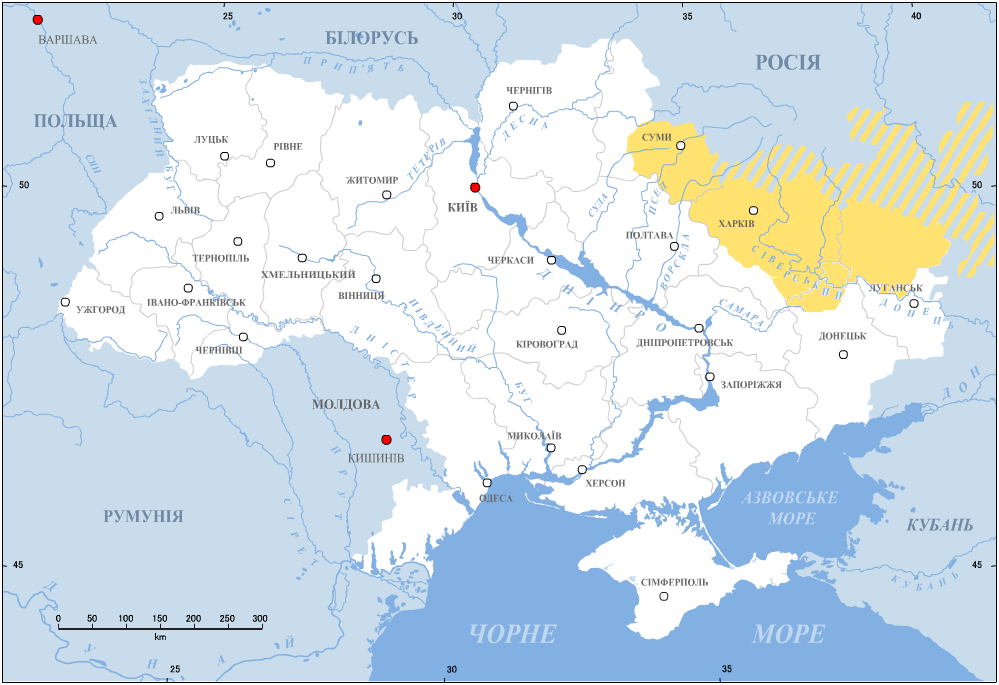
Sloboda Ukraine

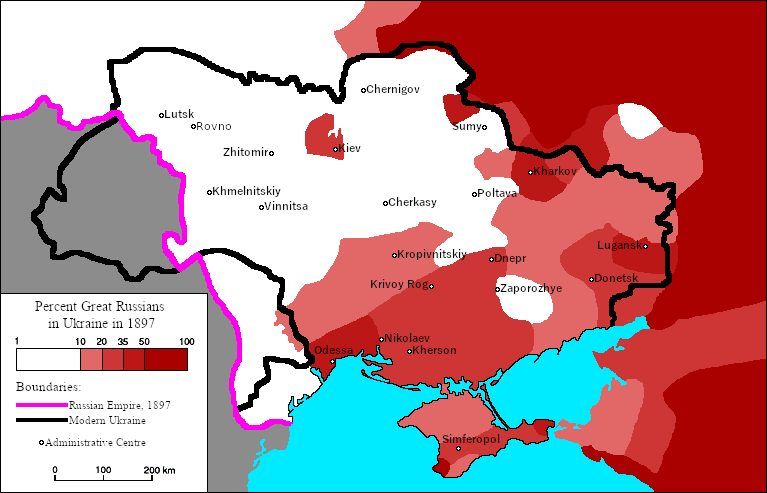
The regional concentration of the ethnic Russian population of Ukraine in 1897

More Russian speakers appeared in northern, central and eastern Ukrainian territories during the late 17th century, following the Cossack Rebellion led by Bohdan Khmelnytsky. The uprising led to a massive movement of Ukrainian settlers to the Sloboda Ukraine region, which converted it from a sparsely inhabited frontier area to one of the major populated regions of the Tsardom of Russia. Following the Treaty of Pereyaslav, Ukrainian Cossacks lands, including the modern northern and eastern parts of Ukraine, became a protectorate of the Tsardom of Russia. This brought the first significant, but still small, wave of Russian settlers into central Ukraine (primarily several thousand soldiers stationed in garrisons, out of a population of approximately 1.2 million non-Russians).

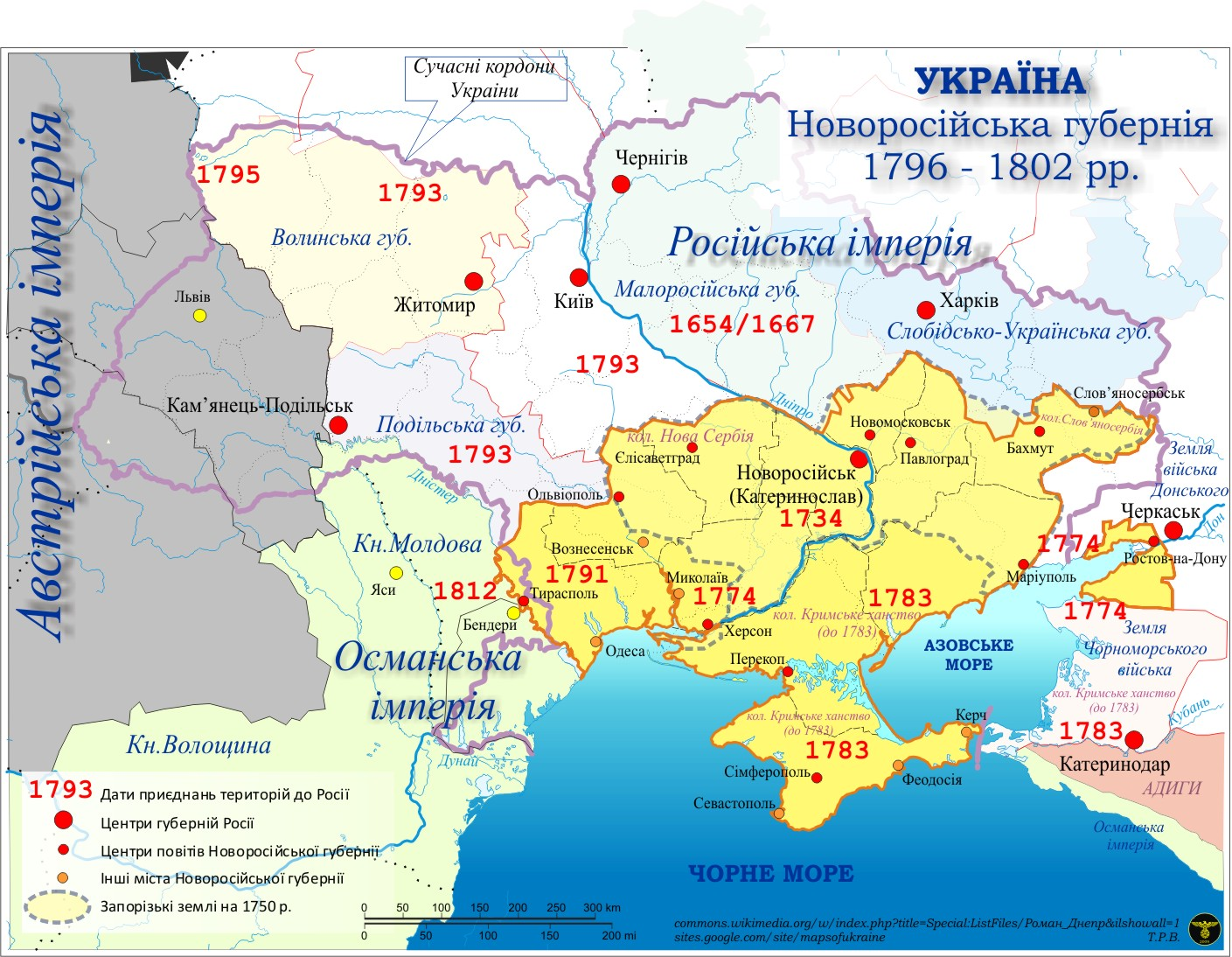
A map of what was known as Novorossiya (New Russia) during the Russian Empire (in yellow). Includes territories of modern Ukraine, Russia and Moldova

At the end of the 18th century, the Russian Empire captured large uninhabited steppe territories from the former Crimean Khanate. The systematic colonization of lands in what became known as Novorossiya (mainly Crimea, Taurida and around Odesa) began. Migrants from many ethnic groups (predominantly Ukrainians and Russians from Russia proper) came to the area. At the same time, the discovery of coal in the Donets Basin also marked the commencement of a large-scale industrialization and an influx of workers from other parts of the Russian Empire.

Nearly all of the major cities of southern and eastern Ukraine were established or developed in this period: Aleksandrovsk (now Zaporizhzhia; 1770), Yekaterinoslav (now Dnipro; 1776), Kherson and Mariupol (1778), Sevastopol (1783), Simferopol and Novoaleksandrovka (Melitopol) (1784), Nikolayev (Mykolaiv; 1789), Odessa (Odesa; 1794), Lugansk (Luhansk; foundation of Luhansk plant in 1795).

Both Russians and Ukrainians made up the bulk of the migrants – 31.8% and 42.0% respectively. The population of Novorossiya eventually became intermixed, and with Russification being the state policy, the Russian identity dominated in mixed families and communities. The Russian Empire officially regarded Ukrainians, Russians and Belarusians as Little, Great and White Russians, which, according to the theory officially accepted in the Imperial Russia, belonged to a single Russian nation, the descendants of the people of Kievan Rus.

In the beginning of the 20th century, Russians were the largest ethnic group in the following cities: Kiev (54.2%), Kharkov (63.1%), Odessa (49.09%), Nikolayev (66.33%), Mariupol (63.22%), Lugansk (68.16%), Berdyansk (66.05%), Kherson (47.21%), Melitopol (42.8%), Yekaterinoslav (41.78%), Yelizavetgrad (34.64%), Pavlograd (34.36%), Simferopol (45.64%), Feodosiya (46.84%), Yalta (66.17%), Kerch (57.8%), Sevastopol (63.46%), Chuguev (86%).

=== Russian Civil War in Ukraine ===
The first Russian Empire Census, conducted in 1897, showed extensive usage (and in some cases dominance) of the Little Russian, a contemporary term for the Ukrainian language, in the nine south-western Governorates and Kuban. Thus, when the Central Rada officials were outlining the future borders of the new Ukrainian state they took the results of the census in regards to the language and religion as determining factors. The ethnographic borders of Ukraine thus turned out to be almost twice as large as the original Bohdan Khmelnytsky State incorporated into the Russian Empire during the 17-18th centuries.

During World War I, a strong national movement managed to obtain some autonomous rights from the Russian government in Saint Petersburg. However, the October Revolution brought big changes for the new Russian Republic. Ukraine became a battleground between the two main Russian war factions during the Russian Civil War (1918–1922), the Communist Reds (Red Army) and the Anti-Bolshevik Whites (Volunteer Army).

The October Revolution also found its echo amongst the extensive working class, and several Soviet Republics were formed by the Bolsheviks in Ukraine: the Ukrainian People's Republic of Soviets, Soviet Socialist Republic of Taurida, Odessa Soviet Republic and the Donetsk-Krivoy Rog Republic.

The Russian SFSR government supported military intervention against the Ukrainian People's Republic, which at different periods controlled most of the territory of present-day Ukraine with the exception of Crimea and Western Ukraine. Although there were differences between Ukrainian Bolsheviks initially, which resulted in the proclamation of several Soviet Republics in 1917, later, due in large part to pressure from Vladimir Lenin and other Bolshevik leaders, one Ukrainian Soviet Socialist Republic was proclaimed.

The Ukrainian SSR was de jure a separate state until the formation of the USSR in 1922 and survived until the breakup of the Soviet Union in 1991. Lenin insisted that ignoring the national question in Ukraine would endanger the support of the Revolution among the Ukrainian population and thus new borders of Soviet Ukraine were established to the extent that the Ukrainian People's Republic was claiming in 1918. The new borders completely included Novorossiya (including the short-lived Donetsk-Krivoy Rog Soviet Republic) and other neighboring provinces, which contained a substantial number of ethnic Russians.

=== Ukrainization in Early Soviet times ===
In his 1923 speech devoted to the national and ethnic issues in the party and state affairs, Joseph Stalin identified several obstacles in implementing the national program of the party. Those were the "dominant-nation chauvinism", "economic and cultural inequality" of the nationalities and the "survivals of nationalism among a number of nations which have borne the heavy yoke of national oppression".

In Ukraine's case, both threats came, respectively, from the south and the east: Novorossiya with its historically strong Russian cultural influence, and the traditional Ukrainian center and west. These considerations brought about a policy of Ukrainization, to simultaneously break the remains of the Great Russian attitude and to gain popularity among the Ukrainian population, thus recognizing their dominance of the republic. The Ukrainian language was mandatory for most jobs, and its teaching became compulsory in all schools.

By the early 1930s attitudes towards the policy of Ukrainization had changed within the Soviet leadership. In 1933 Stalin declared that local nationalism was the main threat to Soviet unity. Consequently, many changes introduced during the Ukrainization period were reversed: Russian language schools, libraries and newspapers were restored and even increased in number. Changes were brought territorially as well, forcing the Ukrainian SSR to cede some territories to the RSFSR. Thousands of ethnic Ukrainians were deported to the far east of the Soviet Union, numerous villages with Ukrainian majority were eliminated with Holodomor, while remaining Ukrainians were subjected to discrimination. During this period parents in the Ukrainian SSR could choose to send their children whose native language was not Ukrainian to schools with Russian as the primary language of instruction.

=== Later Soviet times ===
The territory of Ukraine was one of the main battlefields during World War II, and its population, including Russians, significantly decreased. The infrastructure was heavily damaged and it required human and capital resources to be rebuilt. This compounded with depopulation caused by two famines of 1931–1932 and a third in 1947 to leave the territory with a greatly reduced population. A large portion of the wave of new migrants to industrialize, integrate and Sovietize the recently acquired western Ukrainian territories were ethnic Russians who mostly settled around industrial centers and military garrisons. This increased the proportion of the Russian speaking population.

Near the end of the War, the entire population of Crimean Tatars (numbering up to a quarter of a million) was expelled from their homeland in Crimea to Central Asia, under accusations of collaborations with Germans. The Crimea was repopulated by the new wave of Russian and Ukrainian settlers and the Russian proportion of the population of Crimea went up significantly (from 47.7% in 1937 to 61.6% in 1993) and the Ukrainian proportion doubled (12.8% in 1937 and 23.6% in 1993).

The Ukrainian language remained a mandatory subject of study in all Russian schools, but in many government offices preference was given to the Russian language that gave an additional impetus to the advancement of Russification. The 1979 census showed that only one third of ethnic Russians spoke the Ukrainian language fluently.

In 1954, the Presidium of the Supreme Soviet of the USSR issued the decree on the transfer of the Crimean Oblast from the Russian SFSR to the Ukrainian SSR. This action increased the ethnic Russian population of Ukraine by almost a million people. Many Russian politicians considered the transfer to be controversial. Controversies and legality of the transfer remained a sore point in relations between Ukraine and Russia for a few years, and in particular in the internal politics in Crimea. However, in a 1997 treaty between the Russian Federation and Ukraine, Russia recognized Ukraine's borders and accepted Ukraine's sovereignty over Crimea.

=== Ukraine after the dissolution of the Soviet Union ===
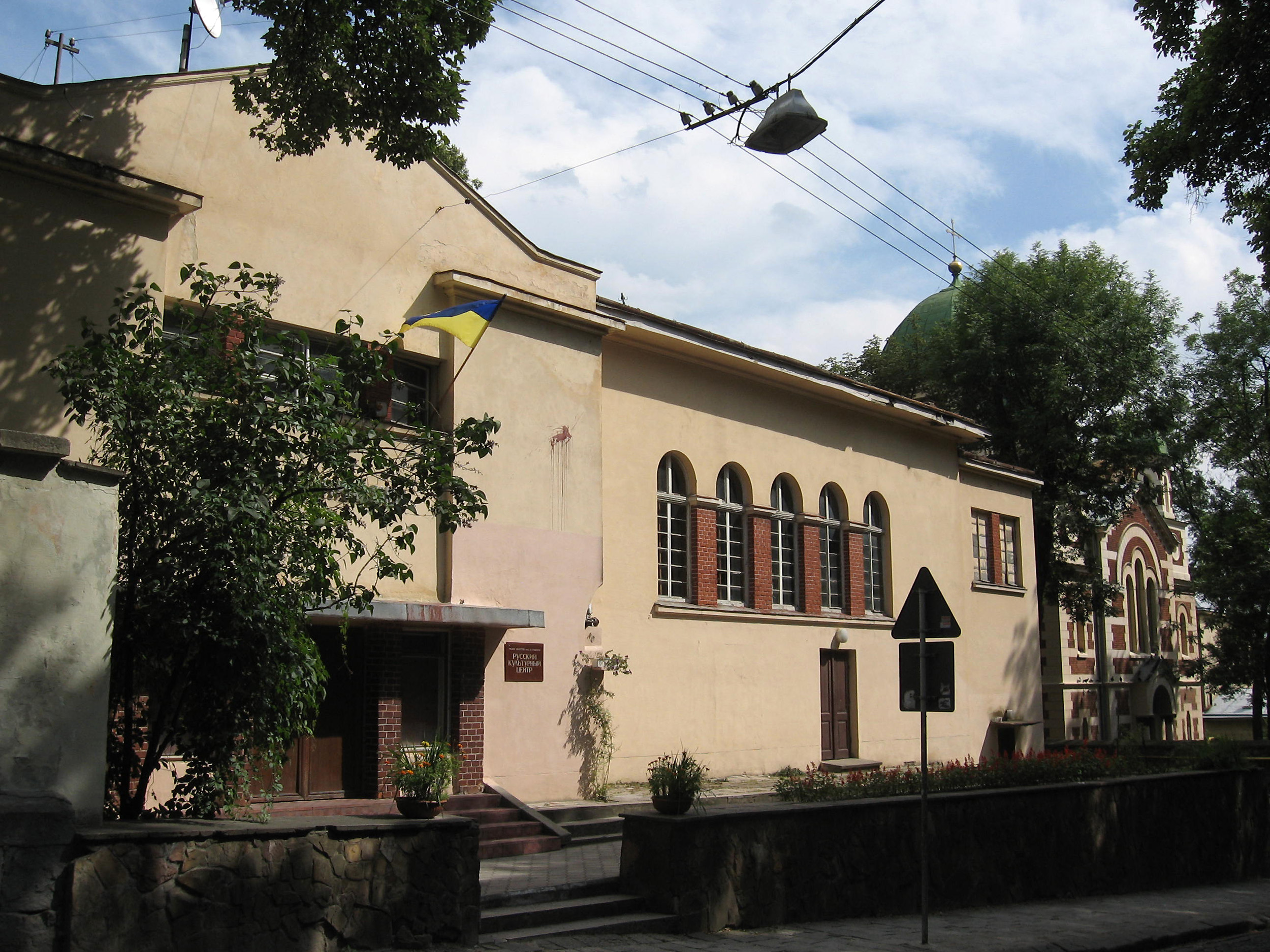
The Russian Cultural Center in Lviv has been attacked and vandalized on several occasions. On January 22, 1992, it was raided by UNA-UNSO led by a member of the Lviv Oblast Council.

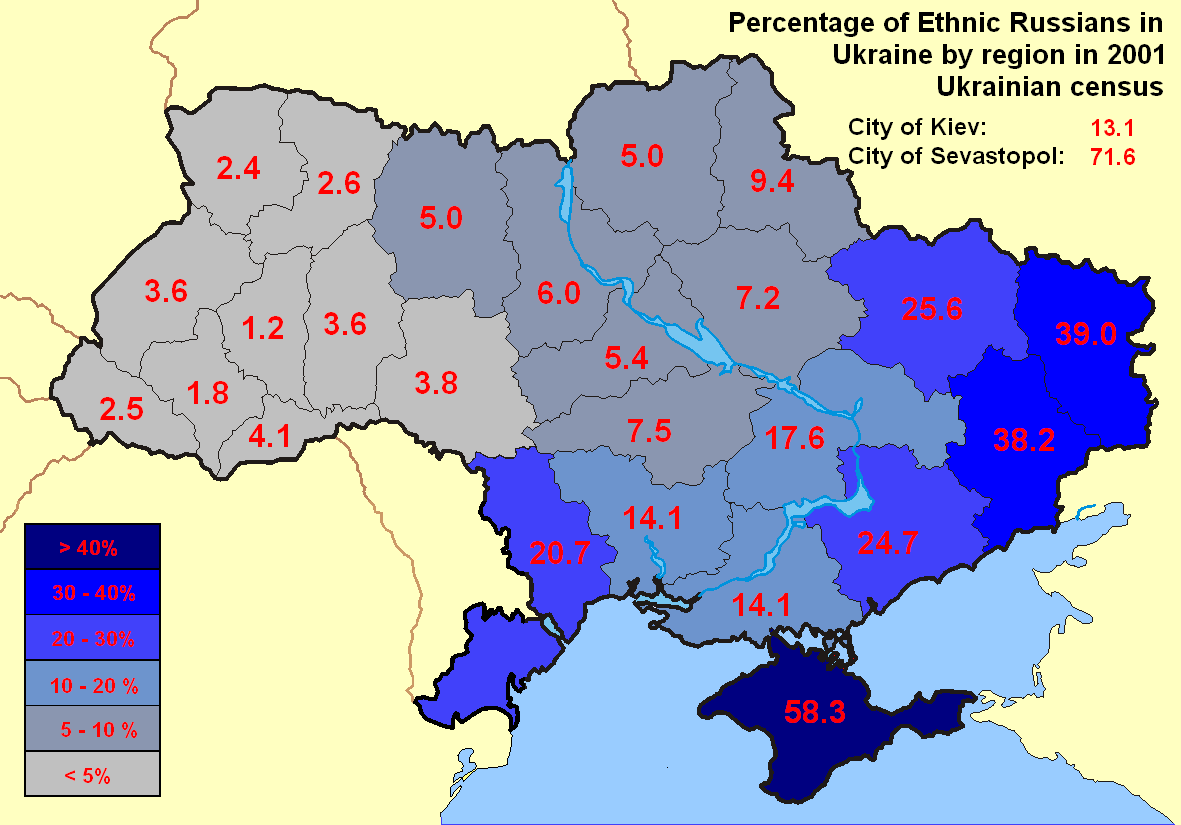
According to the 2001 Ukrainian Census the percentage of Russian population tends to be higher in the east and south in the country.

Following the dissolution of the Soviet Union, Ukraine became an independent state. This independence was supported by the referendum in all regions of Ukrainian SSR, including those with large Russian populations. A study of the National Academy of Sciences of Ukraine found that in 1991, 75% of ethnic Russians in Ukraine no longer identified themselves with the Russian nation. In the December 1991 Ukrainian independence referendum 55% of the ethnic Russians in Ukraine voted for independence.

The return of Crimean Tatars has resulted in high-profile clashes over land ownership and employment rights.

In 1994 a referendum took place in the Donetsk Oblast and the Luhansk Oblast, with around 90% supporting the Russian language gaining status of an official language alongside Ukrainian, and for the Russian language to be an official language on a regional level. The referendum was annulled by the Kyiv government.

The reduction of schools with Russian as their main language of instruction has been controversial. In 1989, there were 4,633 schools with Russian as the main instruction language, and by 2001 this number had decreased to 2,001 schools or 11.8% of the total in the country. A number of these Russian schools were converted into schools in with both Russian and Ukrainian language classes. By 2007, 20% of pupils in public schools studied in Russian classes.

Some regions such as Rivne Oblast have no schools with Russian-only instruction left, but only Russian classes provided in the mixed Russian-Ukrainian schools. As of May 2007, there were seven schools with Russian as the main language of instruction in Kyiv, with 17 more mixed language schools (totaling 8,000 pupils)—the remaining pupils attended schools with Ukrainian being the only language of instruction. Of these, 45,700 studied Russian as a separate subject, in a largely Russophone Ukrainian capital. An estimated 70 percent of Ukraine's population nationwide considered that both Russian and Ukrainian should be taught at secondary schools.

On 22 January 1992, the Russian Cultural Center in Lviv was raided by UNA-UNSO, led by the member of Lviv Oblast Council. UNA-UNSO members searched the building, destroyed archives and pushed people outside, declaring that everything in Ukraine belonged to the Ukrainians, so the Russians and the Jews were not allowed to reside or have property there. The building was vandalized during the Papal Visit to Lviv in 2001, and on multiple occasions between 2003 and 2006.

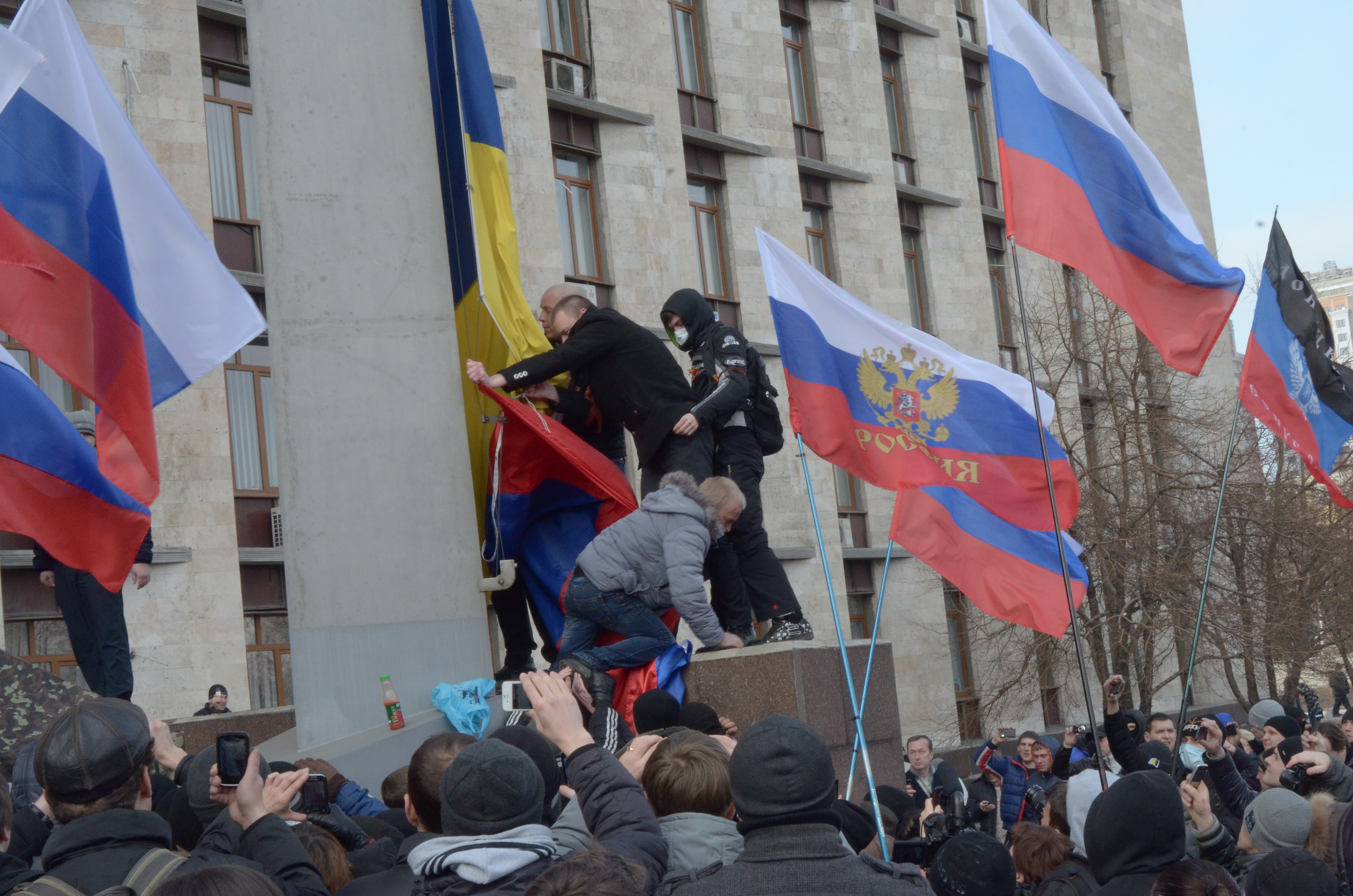
Pro-Russian protesters remove a Ukrainian flag and replace it with a Russian flag in front of the Donetsk Oblast Regional State Administration building during the 2014 pro-Russian conflict in Ukraine.

After the Euromaidan events, regions with a large ethnic Russian populations became the scene of Anti-Maidan protests and Russian-backed separatist activity. After being seized by Russian unmarked troops, the Supreme Council of Crimea announced the 2014 Crimean referendum, and sent a request to Russia to send military forces into the Crimea to "protect" the local population from Euromaidan protesters, which marked the beginning of the Russian annexation of Crimea. After the elected regional parliament of the Donetsk Oblast refused to comply with the demands of the pro-Russian protesters, the secessionists decided to create their own council consisting of unelected separatist individuals, which in its first session voted to conduct a referendum on deciding the future of the region.

On 3 March, Russian nationals with "clear Russian accents" and others, who referred to themselves as "tourists", started storming the regional administration building in Donetsk, waving Russian flags and shouting ″Russia!″ and ″Berkut are heroes!″. The police was not able to offer much resistance, and was quickly overrun by the crowd. The regional council in Luhansk, in which the party of ousted pro-Russian president Viktor Yanukovich held an absolute majority, voted to demand granting the Russian language the status as second official language, stopping ″the persecution of Berkut fighters″, disarming Maidan self-defense units and banning a number far-right political organizations like Svoboda and UNA-UNSO. If the authorities failed to comply with the demands, the Oblast council reserved itself the ″right to ask for help from the brotherly people of the Russian Federation.″

The pro-Russian protests in Donetsk and Luhansk oblasts of the 2014 pro-Russian conflict in Ukraine escalated into an armed separatist insurgency, which was backed by Russian special and regular forces. This led the Ukrainian government to launch a military counter-offensive against the insurgents in April 2014. During this war, Luhansk and Donetsk have been shelled. According to the United Nations, 730,000 refugees from the Donetsk and Luhansk oblasts have fled to Russia since the beginning of 2014. Approximately 14,200 people, including 3,404 civilians, have died from 2014 to 2022 because of the war.

Ruslan Stefanchuk, the Chairman of the Verkhovna Rada, said that there is no "Russian ethnic minority" in Ukraine and that "if these people show aggression rather than respect towards Ukraine, then their rights should be correspondingly suppressed."

==== Discrimination ====
According to a 2007 national survey by the Institute of Sociology, 0.5% of respondents described themselves as belonging to a group that faces discrimination by language. In an October 2008 poll, 42.8% of the Ukrainian respondents said they regard Russia as "very good" while 44.9% said their attitude was "good" (87% positive).

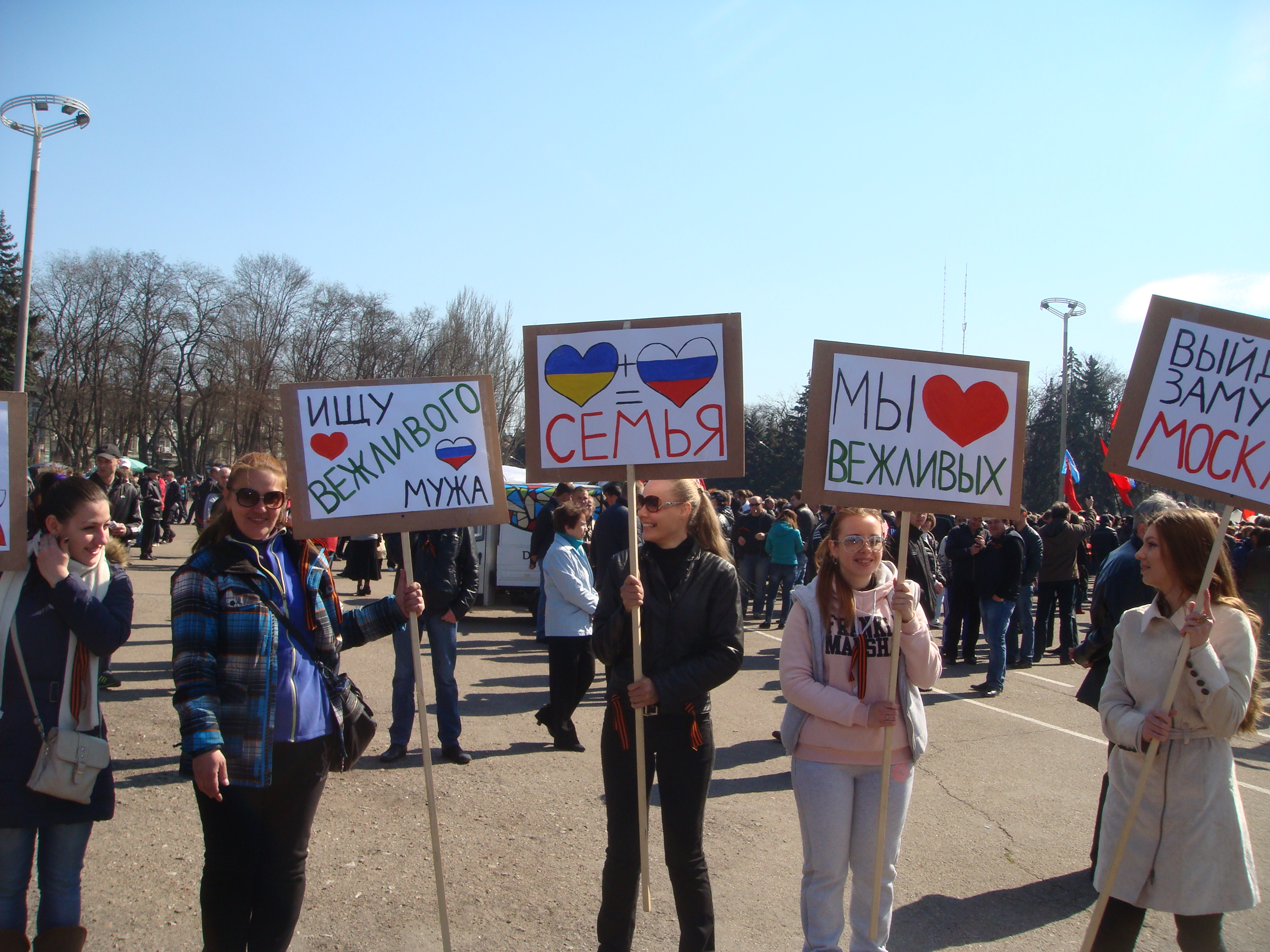
Pro-Russian activists in Odesa, March 2014

According to Institute of Sociology surveys conducted annually between 1995 and 2005, the percentage of respondents who have encountered cases of ethnic-based discrimination against Russians during the preceding year has consistently been low (mostly in single digits), with no noticeable difference when compared with the number of incidents directed against any other nation, including the Ukrainians and the Jews. According to the 2007 Comparative Survey of Ukraine and Europe, 0.1% of Ukrainian residents consider themselves belonging to a group which is discriminated by nationality. However, by April 2017 in a public opinion survey conducted by Rating Group Ukraine, 57 percent of Ukrainians polled expressed a "very cold" or "cold" attitude toward Russia, as opposed to only 17 percent who expressed a "very warm" or "warm" attitude.

Some surveys indicate that Russians are not socially distanced in Ukraine. The indicator of the willingness of Ukraine's residents to participate in social contacts of varying degrees of closeness with different ethnic groups (the Bogardus Social Distance Scale)—based on the yearly sociological surveys—has been consistently showing that Russians are, on the average, least socially distanced within Ukraine except the Ukrainians themselves. The same survey has shown that, in fact, that Ukrainian people are slightly more comfortable accepting Russians into their families than they are accepting Ukrainians living abroad. Such social attitude correlates with the political one as the surveys taken yearly between 1997 and 2005 consistently indicated that the attitude to the idea of Ukraine joining the union of Russia and Belarus is more positive (slightly over 50%) than negative (slightly under 30%).

==== Russian political refugees in Ukraine ====
Since the 2014 Maidan Revolution, the Russian government has increased its anti-opposition campaign, which resulted in politically motivated cases against the Russian liberal opposition. As a result, notable Russians have moved to Ukraine to avoid prosecution. Notable examples are Ilya Ponomaryov (the only member of parliament who voted against the annexation of Crimea), and journalists Matvey Ganapolsky, Arkadiy Babchenko, Evgeny Kiselyov, and Alexander Nevzorov.

According to the United Nations' Office of the High Commissioner for Refugees, in 2014 approximately 140 Russians applied for political asylum in Ukraine. In the first half of 2015, there were 50 more applications. Ukrainian migration policies are complicated, and limit the number of Russians who can successfully apply for a refugee status.

==== Russophobia ====
The ultra-nationalist political party Svoboda has invoked Russophobic and anti-semitic rhetoric. Svoboda has a sizeable electoral presence in local councils, as seen in the Ternopil regional council in Western Ukraine. In 2004, Svoboda's leader Oleh Tyahnybok urged members of his party to fight "the Moscow-Jewish mafia" ruling Ukraine. The party held senior positions in Ukraine's government in 2014, but it lost 30 seats of the 37 seats (its first seats in the Ukrainian Parliament it had won in the 2012 parliamentary election) in the late October 2014 Ukrainian parliamentary election, and did not return to Ukraine's government.

==== Russian language ====
According to 2006 survey by Research & Branding Group (Donetsk), 39% of Ukrainian citizens thought that the rights of the Russophones were violated by Russian not being an official language in Ukraine, whereas 38% of the citizens have the opposite position. According to annual surveys by the Institute of Sociology of the National Academy of Sciences, 43.9–52.0% of the population of Ukraine supported making Russian a state language. At the same time, this was not viewed as an important issue by most of Ukraine's citizens. On a cross-national survey involving ranking the 30 important political issues, the legal status of the Russian language was ranked 26th, with 8% of respondents (concentrated primarily in Crimea and Donetsk) feeling that this was an important issue.

Russian continues to be the primary language of choice in several regions and in Ukrainian businesses, in leading Ukrainian magazines, and other printed media. Russian language in Ukraine still dominates the everyday life in some areas of the country.

On February 23, 2014, the Ukrainian parliament adopted a bill to repeal the 2012 law on minority languages, which—if signed by the Ukrainian president—would have established Ukrainian as the sole official state language of all Ukraine, including Crimea, which is populated by a Russian-speaking majority. The repeal of the law was unpopular in Southern and Eastern Ukraine. The Christian Science Monitor reported: "The [adoption of this bill] only served to infuriate Russian-speaking regions, [who] saw the move as more evidence that the antigovernment protests in Kiev that toppled Yanukovich's government were intent on pressing for a nationalistic agenda." A proposal to repeal the law was vetoed on 28 February 2014 by acting president Oleksandr Turchynov. On 28 February 2018 the Constitutional Court of Ukraine ruled the 2012 law on minority languages unconstitutional.

On September 25, 2017, a new law on education was signed by President Petro Poroshenko (draft approved by Rada on September 5, 2017) which says that Ukrainian language is the language of education at all levels except for one or more subjects that are allowed to be taught in two or more languages, namely English or one of the other official languages of the European Union. The law faced criticism from officials in Russia and Hungary. According to the New Europe:

The latest row between Kiev and Budapest comes on the heels of a bitter dispute over a decision by Ukraine's parliament – the Verkhovna Rada – to pass a legislative package on education that bars primary education to all students in any language but Ukrainian. The move has been widely condemned by the international community as needlessly provocative as it forces the historically bilingual population of 45 million people who use Russian and Ukrainian interchangeably as mother tongues to become monolingual.

The Unian reported that "A ban on the use of cultural products, namely movies, books, songs, etc., in the Russian language in the public has been introduced" in the Lviv Oblast in September 2018.

==== Authors ====
Some authors born in Ukraine who write in the Russian language, notably Marina and Sergey Dyachenko and Vera Kamsha, were born in Ukraine, but moved to Russia at some point. Marina and Sergey Dyachenko later moved to California.

=== Russo-Ukrainian War ===
In March 2022, during the Siege of Mariupol, Mariupol's deputy mayor Serhiy Orlov said that "Half of those killed by Russian bombing are Russian-origin Ukrainians."

== Demographics ==
=== Trends ===
Census year	Total population of Ukraine	Russians	%
1926	29,018,187	2,677,166	9.2%
1939	30,946,218	4,175,299	13.4%
1959	41,869,046	7,090,813	16.9%
1970	47,126,517	9,126,331	19.3%
1979	49,609,333	10,471,602	21.1%
1989	51,452,034	11,355,582	22.1%
2001	48,457,000	8,334,100	17.2%

In general the population of ethnic Russians in Ukraine increased due to assimilation and in-migration between 1897 and 1939 despite the famine, war and Revolution. Since 1991 it has decreased drastically in all regions, both quantitatively and proportionally. Ukraine in general lost 3 million Russians, or a little over one-quarter of all Russians living there in the 10-year period between 1991 and 2001, dropping from over 22% of the population of Ukraine to just over 17%. In the past 22 years since 2001, a further drop of Russian numbers has continued.

Several factors have affected this – most Russians lived in urban centres in Soviet times and thus were hit the hardest by the economic hardships of the 1990s. Some chose to emigrate from Ukraine to (mostly) Russia or to the West. Finally some of those who were counted as Russians in Soviet times declared themselves Ukrainian during the last census.

The Russian population is also hit by the factors that affected all the population of Ukraine, such as low birth rate and high death rate.

=== Numbers ===
2001 census showed that 95.9% of Russians in Ukraine consider the Russian language to be native for them, 3.9% named Ukrainian to be their native language. The majority, 59.6% of Ukrainian Russians were born in Ukraine. They constitute 22.4% of all urban population and 6.9% of rural population in the country.

Women make up 55.1% of Russians, men are 44.9%. The average age of Russians in Ukraine is 41.9 years. The imbalance in sexual and age structure intensifies in western and central regions. In these regions the Russians are concentrated in the industrial centers, particularly the oblast centres.

=== Current demographic trends ===
Number of Russians by region (Oblast) per the last systematic census in 2001
Oblast	Number in 2001	Percent in 2001
Donetsk Oblast	1,844,400	38.2
Dnipropetrovsk Oblast	627,500	17.6
Kyiv	337,300	13.1
Kharkiv Oblast	742,000	25.6
Lviv Oblast	92,600	3.6
Odesa Oblast	508,500	20.7
Luhansk Oblast	991,800	39.0
Autonomous Republic of Crimea	1,180,400	58.3
Zaporizhzhia Oblast	476,800	24.7
Kyiv Oblast	109,300	6.0
Vinnytsia Oblast	67,500	3.8
Poltava Oblast	117,100	7.2
Ivano-Frankivsk Oblast	24,900	1.8
Khmelnytskyi Oblast	50,700	3.6
Cherkasy Oblast	75,600	5.4
Zhytomyr Oblast	68,900	5.0
Zakarpattia Oblast	31,000	2.5
Mykolaiv Oblast	177,500	14.1
Rivne Oblast	30,100	2.6
Sumy Oblast	121,700	9.4
Chernihiv Oblast	62,200	5.0
Kherson Oblast	165,200	14.1
Ternopil Oblast	14,200	1.2
Volyn Oblast	25,100	2.4
Kirovohrad Oblast	83,900	7.5
Chernivtsi Oblast	37,900	4.1
Sevastopol	270,000	71.6

== Religion ==
The majority of the Russians are Christians of the Eastern Orthodox Faith and predominantly belong to the Ukrainian Orthodox Church, a former Ukrainian exarchate of the Russian Orthodox Church, which received an ecclesiastical Autonomy from the latter on October 27, 1990.

There are small minorities of Old Believers, notably Lipovans, as well as Protestants, indigenous Spiritual Christians, and Catholics among Russians. In addition, there is a sizable portion of those who consider themselves atheists.

== Politics ==
=== Elections ===
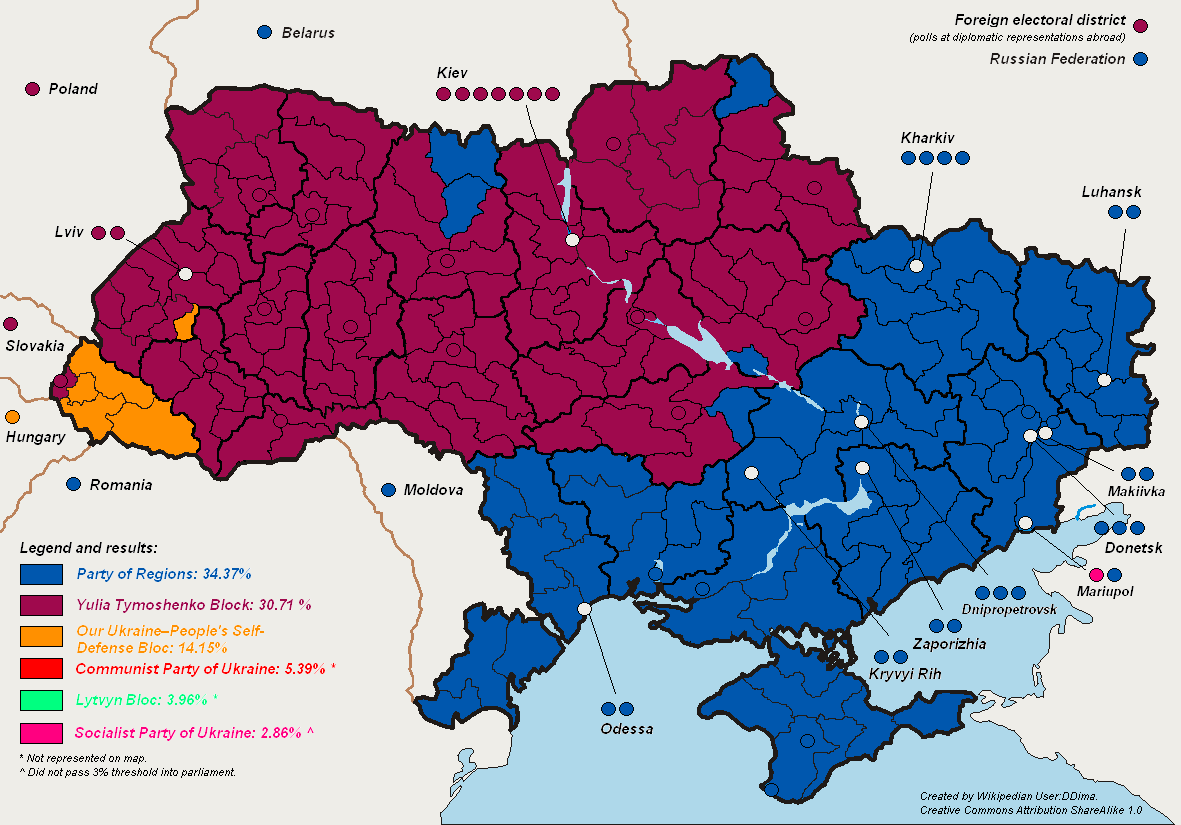
Results of the 2007 parliamentary election showed that the Party of Regions maintained a stronghold in the southern and eastern regions.

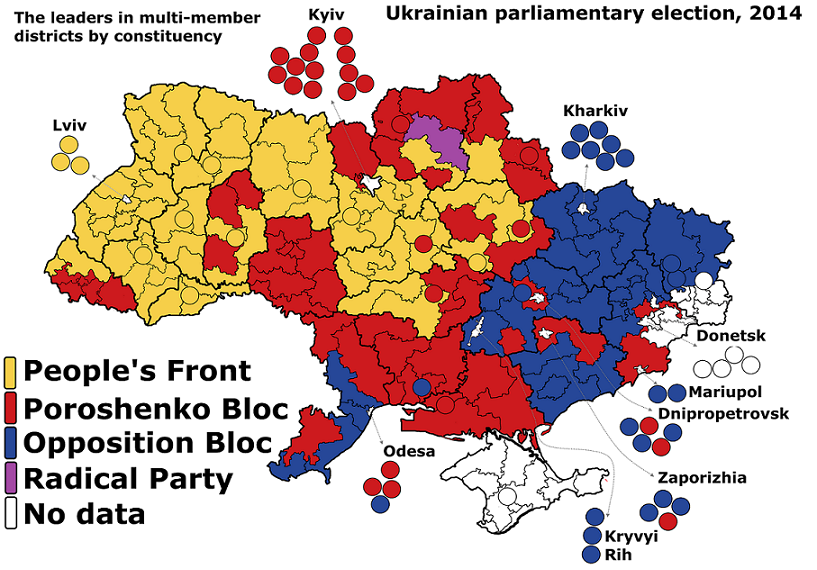
Results of the 2014 parliamentary election show that the Party of Regions successor Opposition Bloc was overrun by the non-pro-Russian Petro Poroshenko Bloc in southern regions.

Political parties whose electoral platforms are crafted specifically to cater to the Russian voters' sentiments fared exceptionally well. Until the 2014 Ukrainian parliamentary election several of Ukraine's elections, political parties that call for closer ties with Russia received a higher percentage of votes in the areas where Russian-speaking population predominate.

Parties like the Party of Regions, Communist Party of Ukraine and the Progressive Socialist Party were particularly popular in Crimea, Southern and Southeastern regions of Ukraine. In the 2002 parliamentary election, the mainstream Party of Regions, with a stronghold based on Eastern and Southern Ukraine came first with 32.14%, ahead of its two nationally conscious main rivals, the Yulia Tymoshenko Bloc (22.29%) and Our Ukraine Bloc (13.95%), while also Russophile Communist Party of Ukraine collected 3.66% and the radically pro-Russian Nataliya Vitrenko Bloc 2.93% coming closest of the small parties to overcoming the 3% barrier.

In the 2007 parliamentary election, the Party of Regions came first with 34.37% (losing 130,000 votes), the Yulia Tymoshenko Bloc second with 31.71% (winning 1.5 million votes), the Our Ukraine–People's Self-Defense Bloc third with 14.15% (losing 238,000 votes), the Communist Party of Ukraine fourth with 5.39% (winning 327,000 votes) while the Nataliya Vitrenko Bloc dropped to 1.32%. Although the Yulia Tymoshenko Bloc attracted most of its voters from Western Ukrainian, Ukrainian-speaking provinces (Oblasts), it had in recent years recruited several politicians from Russian-speaking provinces like Crimea (Lyudmyla Denisova) and Luhansk Oblast (Natalia Korolevska). In the 2012 parliamentary election Party of Regions again won 30% and the largest number of seats while Fatherland (successor to Yulia Tymoshenko Bloc) came second with 25.54%. The Communist Party of Ukraine raised its percentage of the votes in this election to 13.18%.

In the 2014 parliamentary election the Party of Regions successor Opposition Bloc was overrun by the non-pro-Russian Petro Poroshenko Bloc in southern regions. In the election Opposition Bloc scored 9.43%, finishing fourth. Opposition Bloc gained most votes East Ukraine, but scored second best in former Party of Regions stronghold South Ukraine (trailing behind Petro Poroshenko Bloc). The Communist Party of Ukraine was eliminated from representation in the election because it failed to overcome the 5% election threshold with its 3.87% of the votes. Because of the war in Donbas and the unilateral annexation of Crimea by Russia elections were not held in Crimea and also not in large parts of Donbas, both were before stronghold of the Party of Regions and the Communist Party of Ukraine.

=== Pro-Russian movements in Ukraine ===
In 2014, there were political parties and movements in Ukraine that advocated a pro-Russian policy, and pro-Russian political organizations. Many of these were opposed to Ukrainian independence and openly advocated for the restoration of the Russian Empire. Few in number, they generated media coverage and political commentary.

The actions organized by these organizations are most visible in the Ukrainian part of historic Novorossiya (New Russia) in the south of Ukraine and in the Crimea, a region in which in some areas Russians are the largest ethnic group. As ethnic Russians constitute a significant part of the population in these largely Russophone parts of southern Ukraine (and a majority in the Crimea), these territories maintain particularly strong historic ties with Russia on the human level. Thus, a stronger than elsewhere in the country pro-Russian political sentiment makes the area a more fertile ground for the radical pro-Russian movements that are not as common elsewhere in the country.

As of December 2009 clashes between Ukrainian nationalists and pro-Russian organisations do sometimes take place.

==== Organizations ====
Among such movements are the youth organizations, the Proryv (literally the Breakthrough) and the Eurasian Youth Movement (ESM). Both movements' registration and legal status have been challenged in courts; and the leader of Proryv, a Russian citizen, was expelled from Ukraine, declared persona non grata and barred from entering the country again. Alexander Dugin, the Moscow-based leader of the ESM and his associate Pavel Zariffulin have also been barred from travelling to Ukraine because of their involvement in the activities of these organizations, although bans have been later lifted and reinstated again.

These movements openly state their mission as the disintegration of Ukraine and restoration of Russia within the borders of the former Russian Empire and, reportedly, have received regular encouragement and monetary support from Russia's politically connected businessmen. These organizations have been known not only for their pro-Russian activities, but have been also accused of organising massive acts of protest.

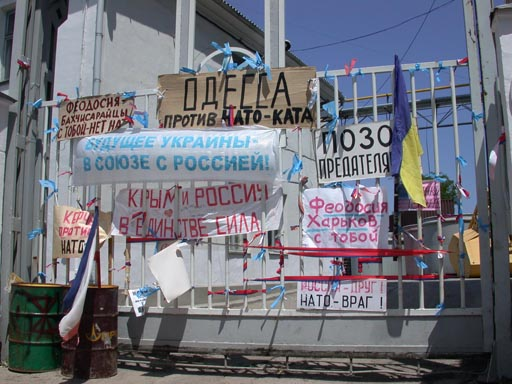
The pro-Russian organization Proryv was involved in the 2006 anti-NATO protests in Crimea. This photo taken on June 11, 2006, in Feodosiya features typical for this organization protesters' banners with pro-Russian and anti-Western rhetoric. Banners claim the solidarity of Bakhchisaray, Kerch, Odesa, Kharkiv with Feodosian protesters. Others say: "The future of Ukraine is in the union with Russia", "Crimea and Russia: the strength lies in unity", "Russia – friend, NATO – enemy", "Shame to traitors."

Some observers point out the Russian government and the Russian Orthodox Church's support of these movements and parties in Ukraine, especially in Crimea. The publications and protest actions of these organizations feature strongly pro-Russian and radically anti-NATO messages, invoking the rhetoric of "Ukrainian-Russian historic unity", "NATO criminality", and other similar claims.

Some observers link the resurgence of radical Russian organizations in Ukraine with Kremlin's fear that the Orange Revolution in Ukraine could be exported to Russia, and addressing that possibility has been at the forefront of these movements' activities.

==== "Russian marches" ====
As a branch of a similar Russian organization the Eurasian Youth Union (ESM) has been organizing annual Russian Marches. These marches have been described as "neo-Nazi" marches and "far-right marches" by international observers like the BBC and Al Jazeera. The November 2006 "Russian march" in Kyiv, the capital, gathered 40 participants, but after the participants attacked the riot police, it was forced to interfere and several participants from were arrested. In Odesa and Crimean cities the November 2006 "Russian marches" drew more participants, with 150–200 participants in Odesa, and 500 in Simferopol and went more peacefully. The marchers were calling for the Ukrainian and Russian Orthodox Church unity as well as the national unity between Russia and Ukraine. In Odesa the march of about 200 people carried anti-Western, pro-Russian slogans and religious symbols.

=== Public opinion ===
In March 2022, shortly after the start of the Russian invasion of Ukraine, a poll found that 82% of ethnic Russians living in Ukraine said they did not believe that any part of Ukraine was rightfully part of Russia. The poll did not involve respondents from Crimea or the separatist-controlled part of Donbas. 65% of Ukrainians—including 88% of those of Russian ethnicity—agreed that "despite our differences there is more that unites ethnic Russians living in Ukraine and Ukrainians than divides us".

== Notable ethnic Russians in Ukraine ==
=== Military ===
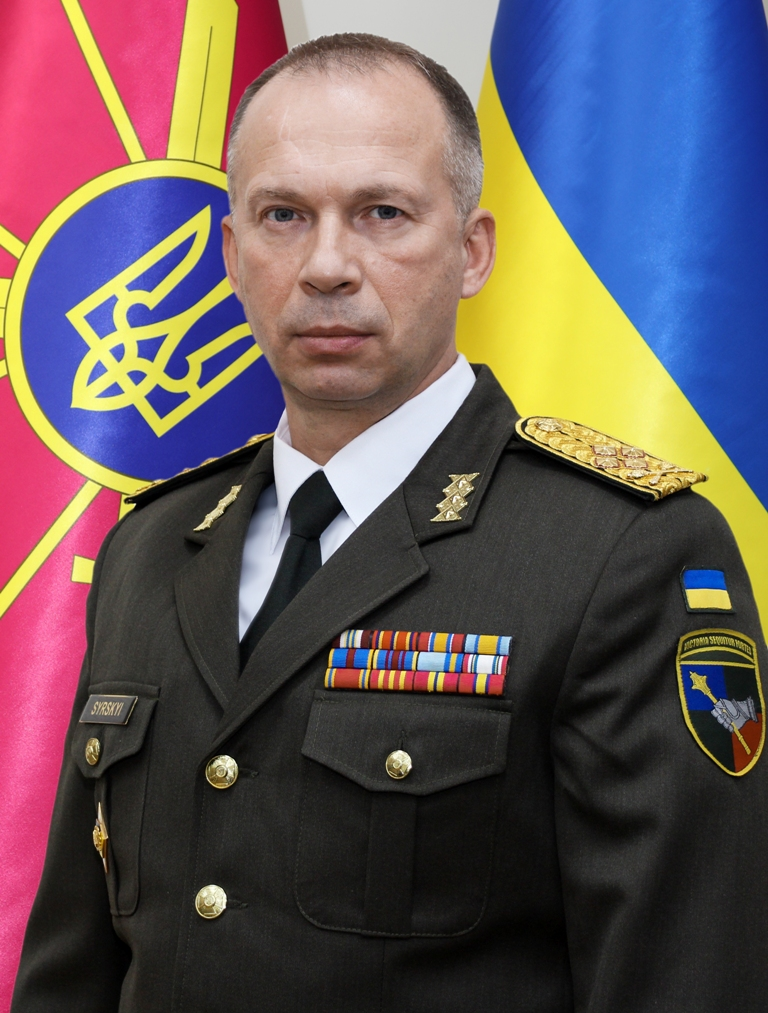
Colonel-general Oleksandr Syrskyi commanded the defence of Kyiv in 2022

- Denis Kapustin (born 1984), Russian commander for Ukraine
- Oleksandr Syrskyi (born 1965), Commander-in-Chief of the Armed Forces of Ukraine from 2024 to 2026

=== Politicians ===
- Ilya Ponomarev (born 1975), member of the Russian State Duma from 2007 to 2016
- Mykola Azarov (born 1947), former Prime Minister of Ukraine of mixed Russian (by mother) and Estonian (by father) ethnicity.

=== Sportspeople ===
- Oleg Blokhin (born 1952), Ukrainian football coach of mixed Ukrainian (by mother) and Russian (by father) ethnicity who was formerly a striker for the USSR national football team. He was named European Footballer of the Year in 1975.

=== Other ===
- Mykola Kostomarov (1817–1885), one of the most distinguished Russian–Ukrainian historians, one of the first anti-Normanists, and the father of modern Ukrainian historiography

== See also ==
- List of Ukrainians of Russian ethnicity
- Russian language in Ukraine
- Russification of Ukraine
- Chronology of Ukrainian language suppression
- Internationalism or Russification?
- Derussification in Ukraine
- Ukrainianization
- Demographics of Ukraine
- Demographic history of Crimea
- Russian Cultural Center in Lviv
- Anti-Russian sentiment in Ukraine
- Ukrainians in Russia
- Polish minority in Ukraine
