= Mexicans Without Borders =

American human rights organization

Mexicans Without Borders (Spanish: Mexicanos Sin Fronteras) is a Washington, D.C.–based rights group that has been active against what it sees as the growing harassment of alien workers. The group also seeks to address the broader social and political roots of immigration.

The central objectives of MSF are permanent residency for all illegal aliens residing in the country and the establishment of legal channels for future waves of aliens.

The committees of undocumented folks that now form the organization first came together in 2001. Its organizers claim that giving permanent residency to the 11 million workers and families in the country illegally would greatly benefit all workers. They have stated that they support all reforms that benefit aliens, but are looking for a more thorough reform that provides solutions to the phenomenon of immigration at a structural level, not just at the level of legality.

The group has organized mass demonstrations in the Virginia and Washington D.C. areas to protest local laws that they claimed targeting aliens. They also document and record cases of alleged discrimination and racial profiling in order to build civil lawsuits in federal courts.
