= Worldwide Somali Students & Professionals =

- Founded: 2010
- Founder: Kasim Ali
- Type: NGO
- Purpose: development
- Location: London, United Kingdom
- Region served: Somalia Djibouti
- Method: event planning, scouting
- Website: worldwidesomalistudents.com

Worldwide Somali Students & Professionals (WSSP) is a Somali non-governmental organization.

== Overview ==
The WSSP was established in 2010 at the University College London (UCL) by a group of students. It is non-political and non-ideological in its outlook, with representatives in over 40 countries around the world. The foundation also hosts both local and virtual events to raise awareness and support for its activities.

== Mission ==
In a 2012 interview conducted by Ohio State University, the WSSP's founder Kasim Ali described his organization as a global movement that aims to recruit Somali students and professionals working in the fields of engineering, healthcare, education and agriculture, and enlist their services in Somalia's ongoing post-conflict reconstruction process. The WSSP is also liaising with Somali professionals in business and transportation, among other sectors.

== Activities ==
=== 2011 Eastern Africa drought ===
In response to the 2011 Eastern Africa drought, WSSP operated a food distribution center during the holy month of Ramadan for 1000 internally displaced people in Somalia's capital, Mogadishu. Contributions came from Somali students and professionals from around the world, with WSSP youngsters running operations on the ground.

=== Operation Restore Home 2012 ===
After extensive consultations with Somali stakeholders, the WSSP launched in 2012 its flagship grassroots initiative, tentatively titled Operation Restore Hope. Later renamed Operation Restore Home 2012, the campaign was inaugurated in Columbus, Ohio since the city hosts one of the largest Somali communities in the United States, second only to the Twin Cities of Minneapolis–Saint Paul.

The initiative endeavors to mobilize around 1000 qualified Somali youth from the diaspora to repatriate in the summer of 2012. Members are then expected to pool their resources and knowledge to carry out projects in the areas of agriculture, education, health and medicine.

Enlisted students cover their own ticketing costs, and are scheduled to visit around ten cities in Somalia over a period of three months.
