= Russian Cultural Centre (Lviv) =

Coordinates: 50°24′21″N 24°04′07″E

Russian Cultural Center in Lviv (Ukrainian: Російський культурний центр у Львові, Russian: Русский культурный центр во Львове) was an organization of Russian culture in Lviv, the only organization in this interest in West-Ukraine. The center was the first of its kind to be opened in the USSR and it was the only one for a long time in the territory of Ukraine. In October 2016 the center was evicted by the Lviv regional council and the building was handed over to groups involved in the Ukrainian army's operation in eastern Ukraine against pro-Russian separatists.

== History ==
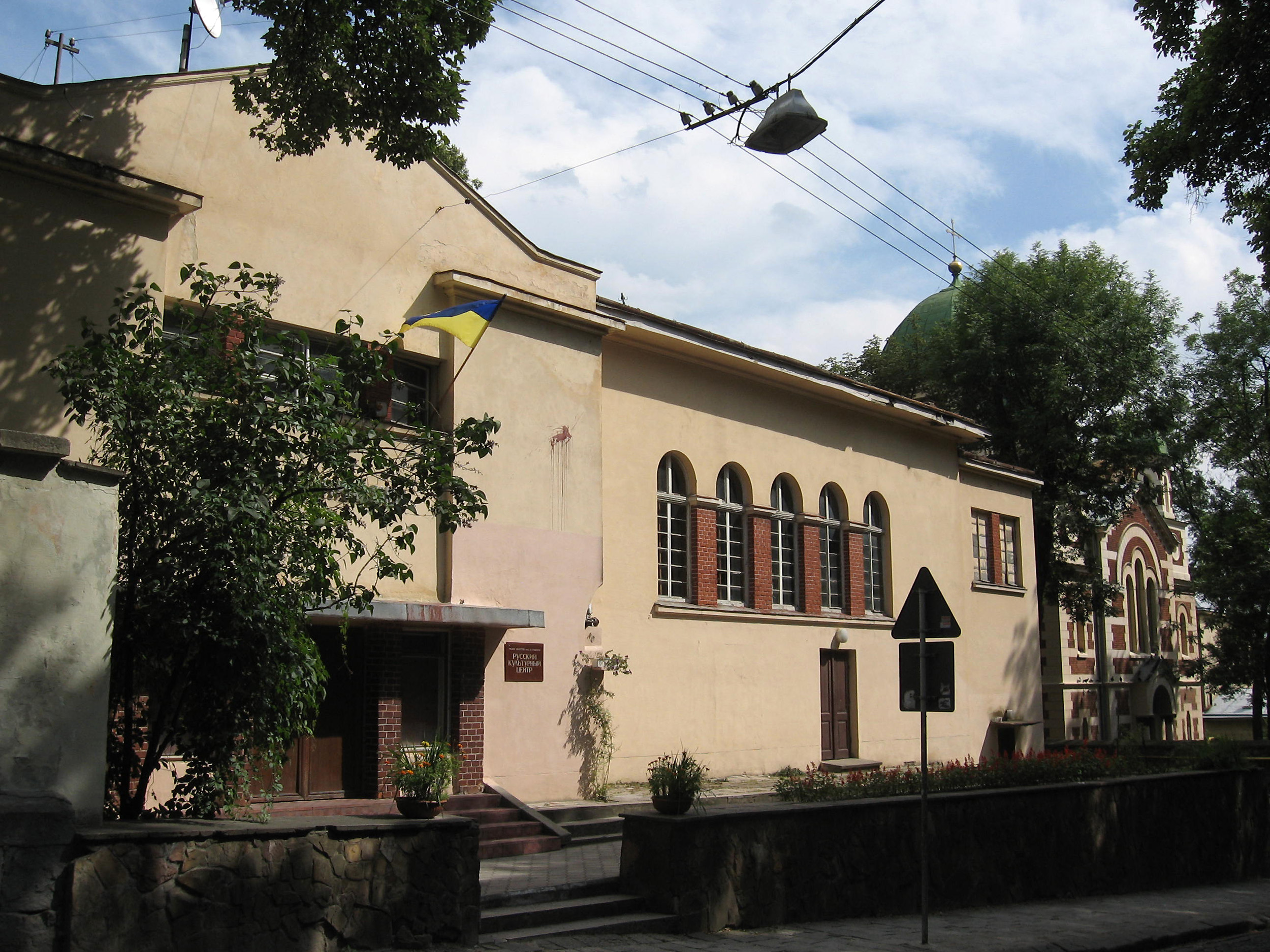
Russian Cultural center in Lviv in July 2007.

The Russian Cultural Center was founded by the Pushkin Society in Lviv. The city council provided an old former cinema building located near the territory of St. George church (the Russian Orthodox church) in October 1990. Initially the "small auditorium" was renovated in April, 1994 followed by the "large auditorium" in April 1996. It is from this date that the organization became active. Money for the renovations was donated by private donors, such as Alexander Svistunov. The latter date is regarded to be founding date for the functioning of the center. It is operated by members of the Pushkin Society. Previously, concerts took place at the Regional Officer's House, The Zinkovska Theater, the Railway Workers Cultural Center and School No. 35.

Since January 1997 there has been an active library in the "Small Auditorium", which after 10 years has over 8,000 publications.

The first director of the centre was Sergey Sokurov, the founder of the Pushkin Society.

In 2015 the Pushkin Societies spit into two. An official one led by Oleg Lyutkov, and another led by Albert Astachov. Only Astachov's Pushkin Society remained and cared for the building situated on No. 1-a Korolenko Street, near the city center of Lviv and paid the bills. For the use of No. 1-a Korolenko Street Lviv took a symbolic rent of 5 hryvnia (about $0.20) every month since 1999 (about 40 cultural organizations pay the city a symbolic rent, including Polish and Czech associations). Meanwhile, the condition of the building deteriorated, as evidenced by water stains on cracked walls and ceilings. The Lviv regional council concluding that the building was being neglected late October 2016 and evicted the Russian cultural center from No. 1-a Korolenko Street while pledging to set aside additional space for the cultural center. According to Albert Astachov "This is an anti-Russian decision." Council chairman Olexander Hanuchtchyn denied this, claiming "We received many complaints. In reality, this is now about bringing order to municipal properties." (Late October 2016) the Lviv regional council also decided to hand over No. 1-a Korolenko Street to groups involved in supporting the Ukrainian army in the War in Donbas against pro-Russian separatists.

== Activity ==
The organization focuses its attention on topics such as the discrimination of Russian culture, political pressure, the post-independence out-migration of the Russian population in Lviv, etc. The organization has worked with other ethnic minority organizations in Lviv, and with several left-wing parties in Ukraine, as well as the Party of Regions. The organization holds numerous cultural activities. It has a theater, a dancing class, a singing-songwriting club, a painters club, an intellectual Games club, children studio, and other community clubs.

The organization also looks after the graves of those who fought for the Russian Empire during the First World War and those who fought for the Soviet Union during the Second World War.

In the 1990s organization representatives statements were perceived in Lviv as anti-Ukrainian.

== Attacks on the RCC ==
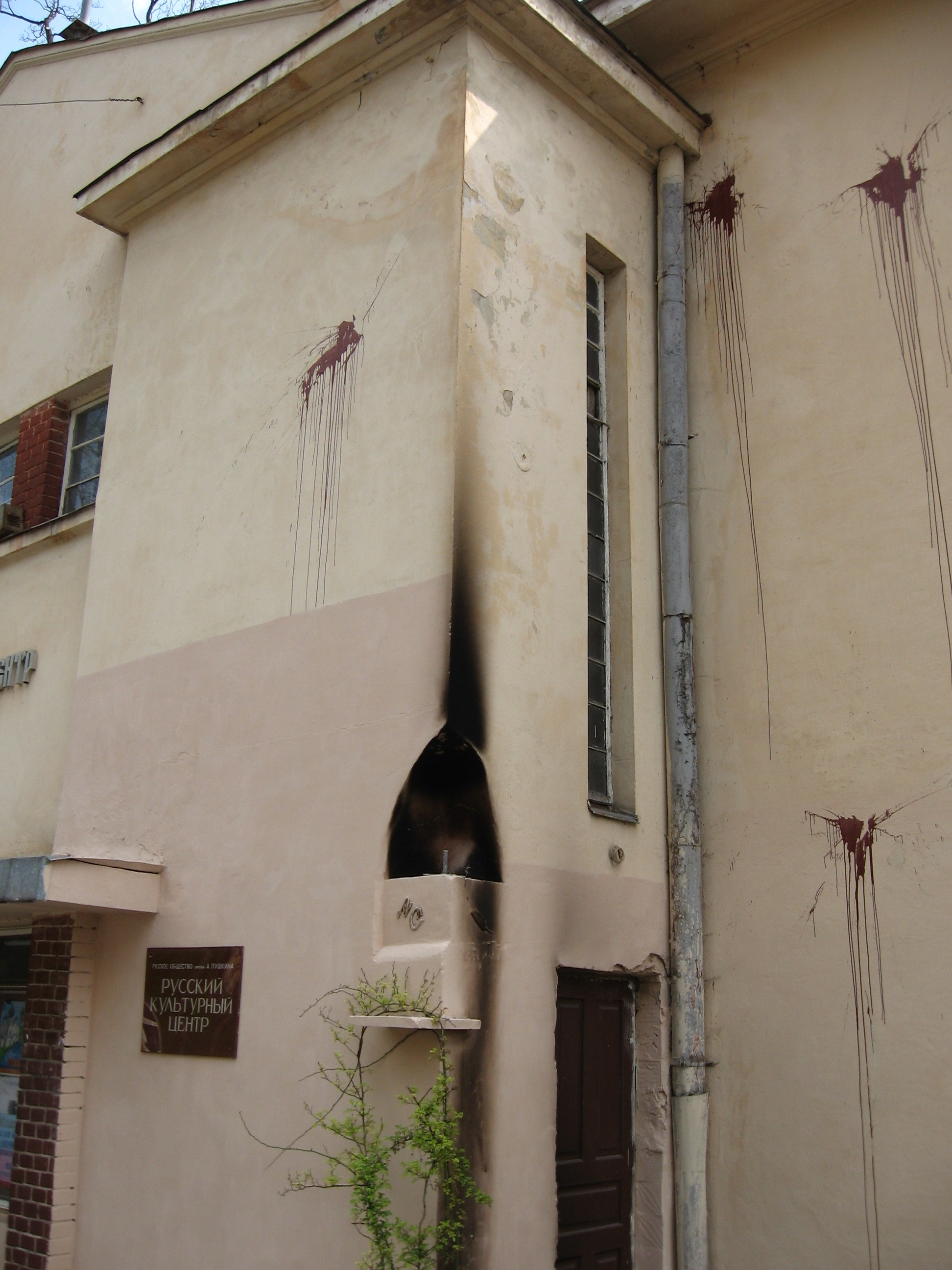
The Russian Cultural Centre in Lviv in April 2007 after being vandalized.

The RCC has been attacked and vandalized on several occasions. On January 22, 1992, it was raided by UNA-UNSO led by a member of Lviv Oblast Council. UNA-UNSO members searched the building, partially destroyed archives and pushed people out from the building. The leader of attackers declared that everything in Ukraine must now be returned to Ukrainians, so the Moskals were not allowed to reside or have property there. The building was vandalized during the Papal Visit to Lviv in 2001, then in 2003 (5 times), 2004 (during the Orange revolution), 2005, 2006

== Closure ==
On October 25, 2016, at a session of the Lviv Regional Council, the deputies decided to evict the Russian Cultural Center from the communal premises at 1A Korolenko Street. On the same day, the deputies decided that the premises should have been returned to the municipal property management body, repaired and then leased to organisations carrying out activities related to the Russian invasion of Donbas.

On May 4, 2017, the executive service of the Department of Justice of the Lviv Oblast evicted the Russian cultural center from the premises. The Deputy Chairman of the Lviv Regional Council Volodymyr Hirnyak commented: ""Victory is ours ... We have done it. The anti-Ukrainian club in Lviv has finally been closed!"

On October 13, 2018, the "Warrior's House" - a center for participants and veterans of the Russian-Ukrainian war - was opened in the building of the former Russian Cultural Centre. It was created by the joint efforts of the regional authorities and the public of the city. The premises of the former Russian center hosted an exhibition of Ukrainian uniforms of the times of King Danylo, the Cossacks, the Ukrainian Sich Riflemen, the Ukrainian Galician Army, the Ukrainian People's Republic, and the Ukrainian Insurgent Army, as well as the uniforms of modern military personnel - the Maidan activists and the participants to the Anti-Terrorist Operation.

== See also ==
- Russians in Ukraine
