= Electronic notetaking =

Electronic notetaking (ENT), also known as computer-assisted notetaking (CAN), is a system that provides virtually simultaneous access to spoken information to people who are deaf and hard of hearing, facilitating equal participation with their hearing colleagues, coworkers, and classmates. This method is most often used in educational or training sessions, but it is also used at health care appointments, meetings, or interviews.

Using a software program, an operator types a summary of the spoken information into a computer at a minimum typing speed of 60 words per minute. The text is then projected on a screen or transmitted to a second computer.

The text also provides a written record of sessions, which is particularly useful for deaf and hard of hearing attendees.

Electronic notetaking began in the 1990s, when the disability legislation changed, such as the Disability Discrimination Act (DDA) in the UK which provided more support.

The operators may work freelance either for an agency or as part of a professional team providing communication support.

== See also ==
- Note-taking (general information)
- Comparison of notetaking software
- Assistive technology
