= Cans =

Cans may refer to:

- the plural of can (see Can (disambiguation))
- a colloquial term for headphones that enclose the ears
- a colloquial term for breasts
- the ISO 15924 code of the Canadian Aboriginal syllabics
- the surname of:
  - Joacim Cans, a Swedish musician
- an acronym for:
  - Childhood acute neuropsychiatric symptoms
  - Complaints of the arm, neck, and shoulder

== See also ==
- Festival de Cans, a Spanish film festival
- Cans-et-Cévennes, a French commune
- Cannes, a city in France
- Julius D. Canns
- Kans
