= Kaunas Cultural Centre of Various Nations =

Coordinates: 54°53′56.00″N 23°53′35.39″E

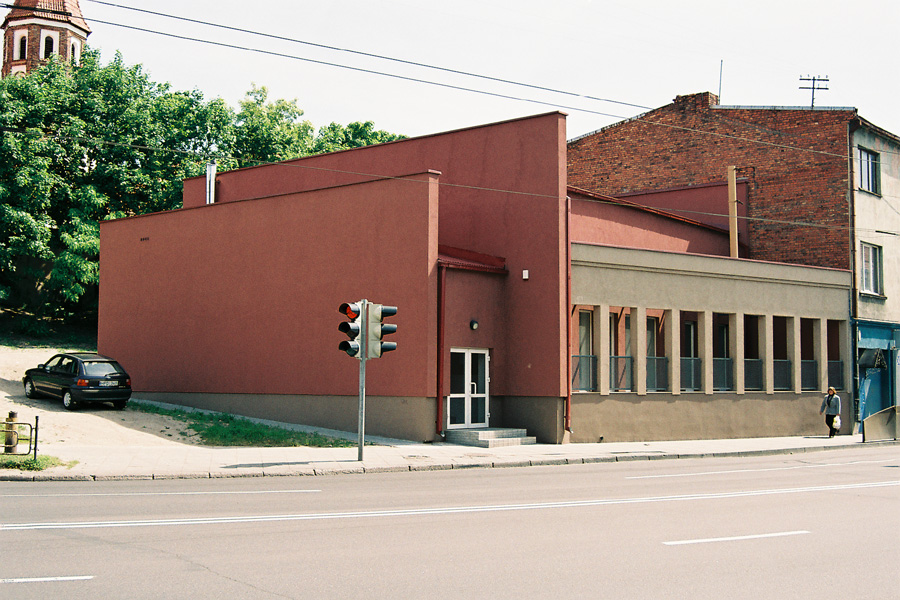
Šv.Gertrūdos St. 58, Kaunas, LT 44261, Lithuania

Kaunas Cultural Centre of Various Nations is a cultural and educational institution intended to preserve the cultural identities of national minorities and encourage their positive integration into the Lithuanian society. The institution promotes international and national tolerance and strives to develop civil society.

== History ==
The institution was founded on April 30, 2004 by the Department of National Minorities and Lithuanians Living Abroad under the Government of the Republic of Lithuania together with the Kaunas City Municipality Council. The official opening of the Kaunas Cultural Centre of Various Nations premises took place on November 18, 2004. Based on the decision of the Government of the Republic of Lithuania, the Department of National Minorities And Lithuanians Living Abroad was reorganized, and the Ministry of Culture of the Republic of Lithuania became a partner of the institution as of January 1, 2010.

== Activities ==
The institution holds over 100 events each year: concerts, art exhibitions, social gatherings, poetry readings, tastings of culinary inheritance and book presentations. It also organizes training trainings and seminars to the leaders of the national minority communities, active members of the organization and other young people. The institution welcomes scientists and specialists to scientific conferences, seminars and debates about the history, activities, problems and integration of national minorities. The administration of the institution gather, sort and distribute the information about the national minorities, assist the scientists, students and school children to carry out their researches, prepare articles and press releases and participate in various TV and radio shows.

From 2006 to 2012, the institution held the annual Lithuanian national minority festivals known as The Bridges of Culture, which was one of the biggest cultural events for the national minorities in Lithuania. The best ethnic minority art groups performed at the festivals and offered their finest artistic creations and workshops for children. Traditionally, it would be an open-air event taking place in the very heart of Kaunas. In 2013, the festival was relocated to Alytus. In 2008 and 2013, the institution also held the annual Festival of Lithuanian National Minority Sunday Schools. Each year this festival takes place in a different city. In 2018 Kaunas cultural centre of various nations started new annual outdoor festival "Garden of cultures" that is traditionally held in Historical Presidential Palace garden in Kaunas.

As of 2006, the institution has been regularly holding photography events where professional photographers interact with the national minority communities and high school students in order to create exhibits representing various cultures, which are later on displayed at various national cultural centers, galleries, schools, shopping malls, and other public venues.

The institution maintains close relationships with the non-governmental institutions of the national minorities (Armenians, Belarusians, Poles, Roma, Russians, Tartars, Ukrainians, Germans, Jews, Kyrgyz people Moroccans etc.). Various events, gatherings and artists’ rehearsals are constantly held by the national minority communities in the premises of the institution.

This is the only institution of such nature in the Kaunas region. A similar organization called the House of National Communities is located in Vilnius.

== International cooperation ==
The institution initiates and participates in international projects funded by the European Union: Lifelong Learning Program (Grundtvig, Leornardo da Vinci) and Youth in Action since 2007 and Erasmus+ since 2014. The Center maintains a relationship with project partners abroad: in Germany, United Kingdom, Norway, Iceland, etc. Participation in the projects of other institutions is also a part of activity. The employees of the institution attend international qualification development trainings and seminars, take part in conferences, internships, youth exchange programs and introductory visits under the EU programs.

In 2015, Kaunas cultural centre of various nations was admitted to an international association of cultural institutions and organisations Roots & Routes International Association, where creates interdisciplinary projects with young artists, promoting social and cultural diversity in the arts.

== Gallery ==
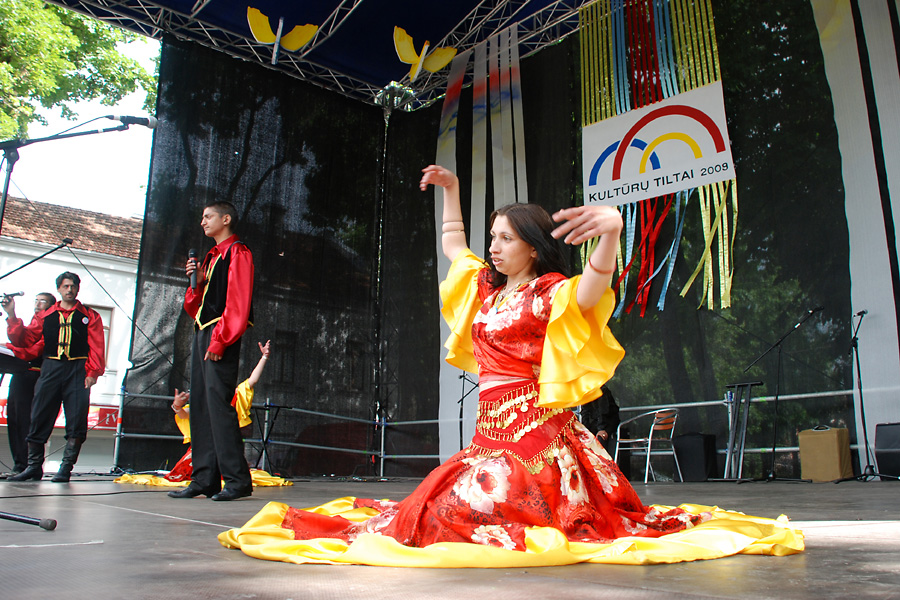
Bridges of Culture 2009

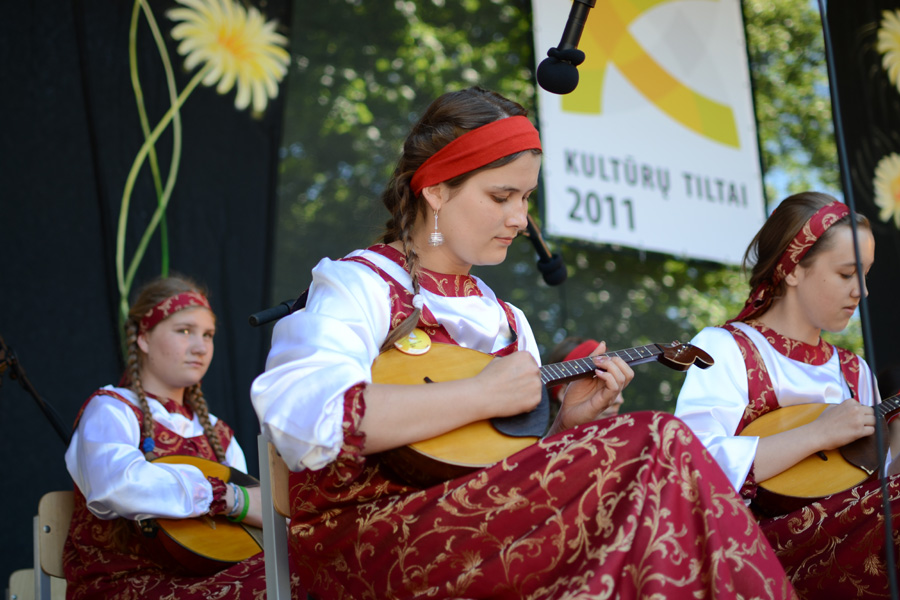
Bridges of Culture 2011

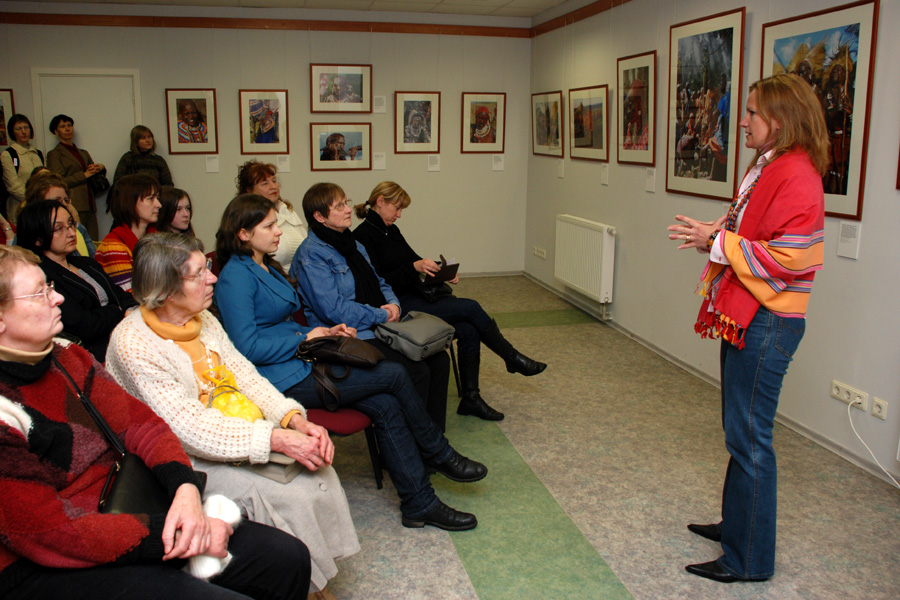
Exhibition about Africa

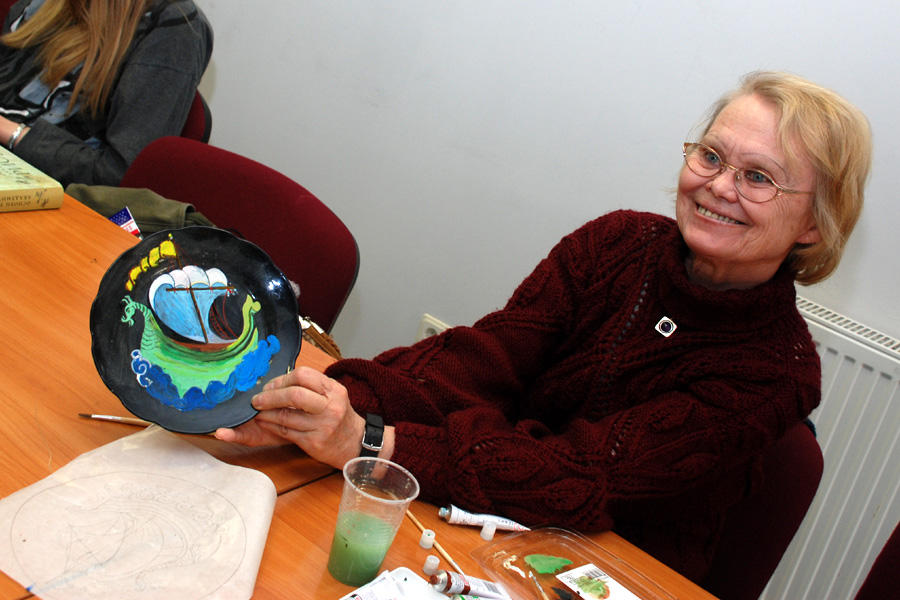
Training of crafts
