= National Latino Congreso =

The National Latino Congreso is a political organization in the United States of Latino Americans for the purpose of mobilizing voters and strengthening the impact of the Latin-American community in the political sphere. It has held meetings in 2006 and 2007 in Los Angeles and advocates issues such as immigration reform including the legalization of undocumented immigrants.
