= Yad Yisroel =

American non-government organization operating in the former Soviet Union

- Founded: 1990
- Headquarters: Brooklyn, New York, United States
- Founder: Stoliner Rebbe
- Key people: Rabbi Yochonon Berman, Rabbi Moshe Fhima, Rabbi Yaakov Shteireman, Rabbi Shmuel Dishon
- Website: http://yadyisroel.com, http://yadyisroel.org

The Yad Yisroel is a non-profit 501(c)(3) organization founded by the Stoliner rebbe in 1990 to work with Jews from the former Soviet Union. It has established community projects and schools in, Minsk, Pinsk and Khmelnytski.

== History ==
Yad Yisroel is a registered non-profit organization in the United States, United Kingdom, Israel and the former Soviet Union.

In April 1992, as an emissary of Stolin, Rabbi Yochonon Berman travelled to Pinsk to conduct a seder.

In 2000, at Berman's suggestion, Yad Yisroel sent Moshe Fhima, who had been working for Yad Yisroel in Kyiv at the Jewish Boarding School, to Pinsk.

Yad Yisroel has established two boarding schools, a yeshiva, a kosher store, a mikveh, and Chesed aid for the elderly in Pinsk.

== Education ==
The schools, with dormitories on campus, combine Jewish studies and a general secular high school curriculum.

== Beis Aharon Boys' School ==
=== Limudei Kodesh ===
Classes cover all levels from introductory level Judaism up to Mishna and Gemara. Full-time counsellors, a doctor and a psychologist are on staff.

=== Beis Aharon Bielski Campus ===
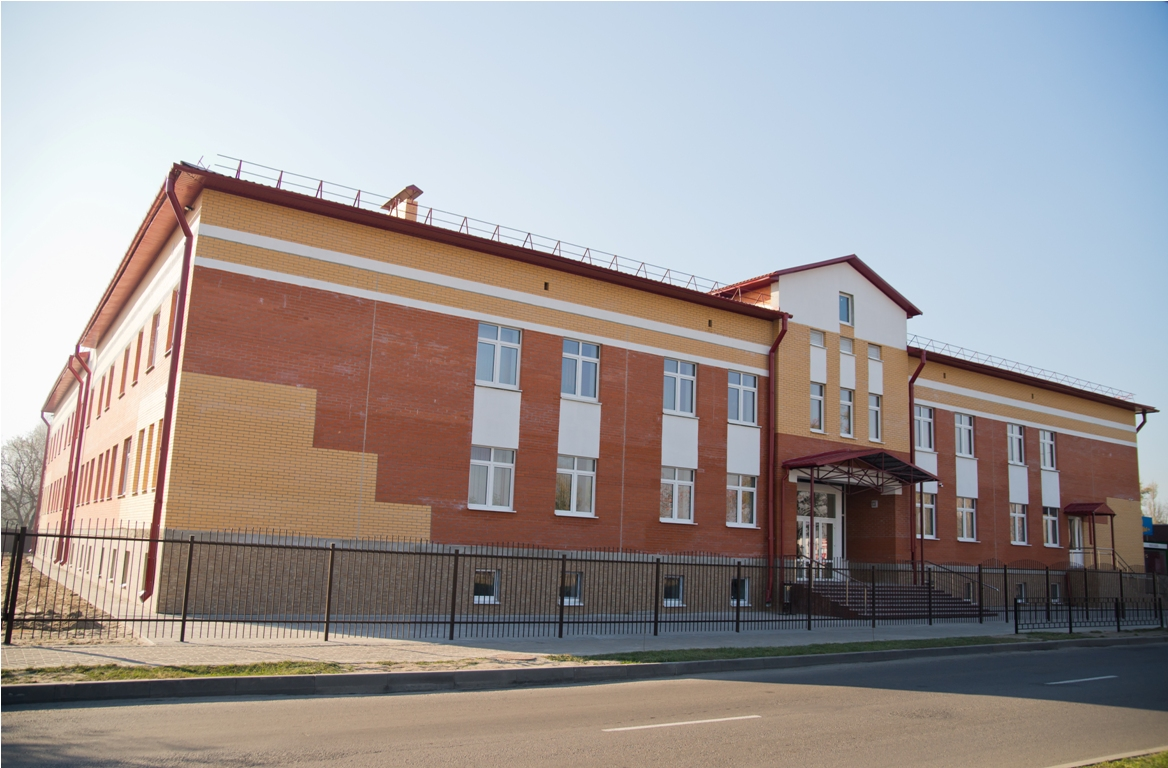
Beis Aharon Bielski School and Orphanage in Pinsk, Belarus

The 5070 square meter campus includes an educational wing, a residence and an orphanage, an auditorium, a kindergarten, a recreational facility, and a kitchen and dining hall. It was inaugurated on Tuesday, October 28, 2014.

== Beis Aharon Girls' School ==
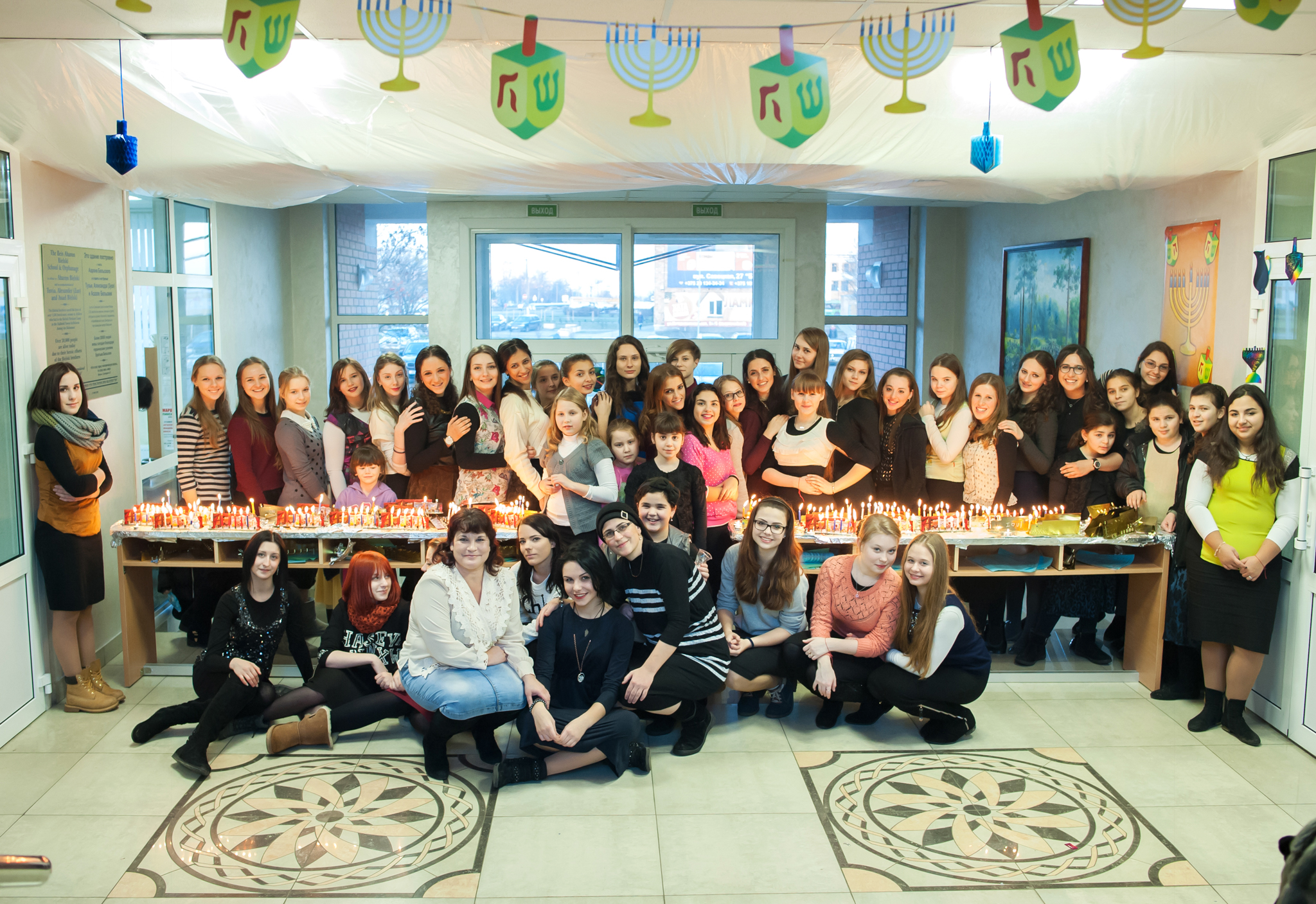
Students of Beis Aharon Girls School celebrate Hanukkah in Pinsk, 2015

There are Beis Aharon Girls Schools in England, USA, Canada, Belarus and Israel.

== Summer Camps ==
Yad Yisroel in Pinsk has organized educational summer camps in Belarus.

== Timeline ==
=== 1990 ===
- A Hebrew Day School is established in Kyiv, eventually having a peak enrolment of 600 students. In addition, yearly summer camps are created - the critical period to reach children and their parents for future scholastic enrolment.
- A shechita butchery is also established in Kyiv - distribution of kosher meat throughout the FSU.
- Establishment of Magen Avot, the social welfare program serving 10,000 homebound and elderly in 52 cities of the Ukraine, subsequently offered to the JDC. The program is still very active.

=== 1991 ===
- Yad Yisroel shaliach Rabbi Yitzchok Wolpin visits Minsk to discuss revival of the Jewish community in the city.
- A mikveh is built in Lviv, Ukraine.

=== 1992 ===
- Rabbi Yochonon Berman arrives in Pinsk.

=== 1993 ===
- Sunday schools are established in various smaller cities.

=== 1994 ===
- Hebrew Day School in Lviv is established, with 140 students.

=== 1995 ===
- A Jewish Sunday school is established in Khmelnytskyi.
- Rabbi Yochonon Berman succeeds in getting back the original Karlin synagogue from the local officials in Pinsk.

=== 1996 ===
- A new mikveh is built in Kyiv. A Jewish boarding school for homeless children and teenagers is also founded in Kyiv.

=== 2000 ===
- The Jewish School and Boarding School for boys is founded in Pinsk by Rabbi Moshe Fhima.

=== 2001 ===
- The Jewish School and Boarding School for girls is founded in Pinsk.

=== 2003 ===
- The girls' school campus in Pinsk is completed.
- Renovations of the Beis Aharon Shul in Pinsk are completed.

=== 2004 ===
- A plot of land for the boys' school campus in Pinsk is purchased.

=== 2005 ===
- The restoration of the Reb Aharon Synagogue in Pinsk is completed.

=== 2006 ===
- Plans to build a new boys' school campus are completed.
- Yeshivas Pe'er Yisroel is established.

=== 2007 ===
- The synagogue of Reb Aharon HaGadol is purchased and prepared for refurbishment.
- A building is purchased to house bochur dormitories.

=== 2008 ===
- Construction begun on boys' school campus.
- Renovations begin on the bochur dormitory building.

=== 2011 ===
- A record number of children attend Yad Yisroel Camp.

=== 2014 ===
- Grand opening of Beis Aharon Bielski School in Pinsk.

=== 2015 ===
- Record number of students in Yeshiva High School in Pinsk.
- The Bielski Campsite is inaugurated.

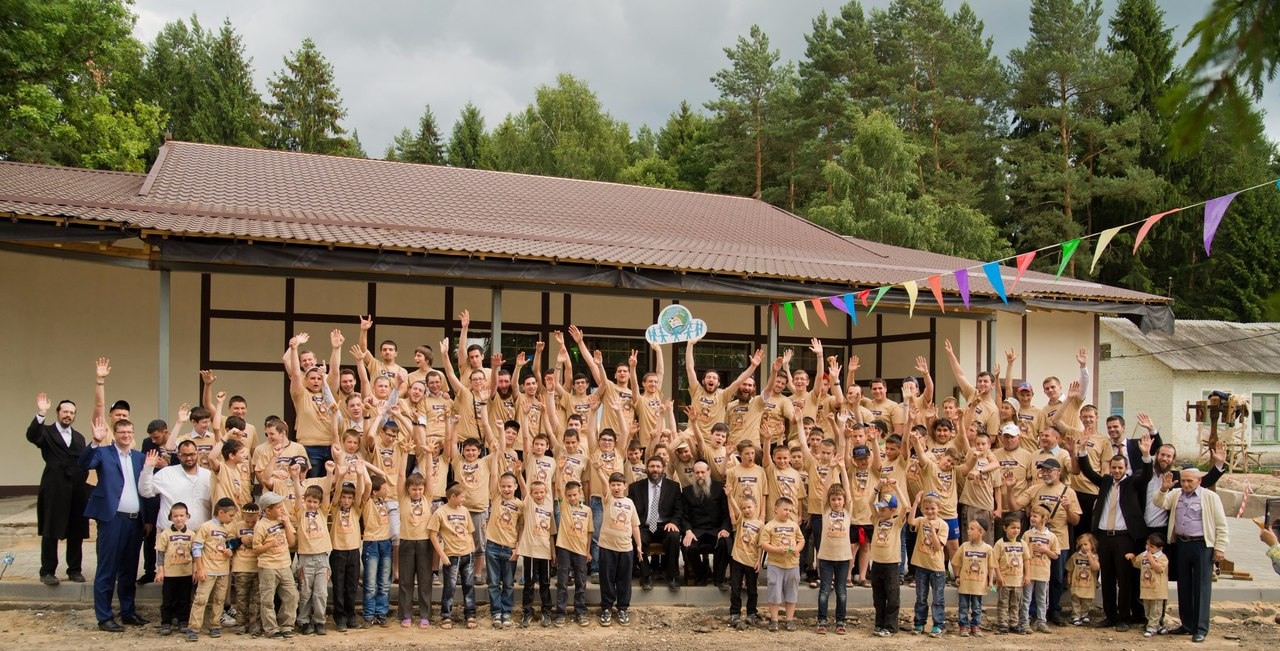
