= NGO Roma Together =

NGO Roma Together is a Bulgarian-based Roma grassroot organization, registered non-profit public entity. It is a watchdog organization that provides legal defence in cases of human rights violations, focused on minority rights, protecting local Romani communities through monitoring and accountability of policies towards Roma. They see their mission as defending Roma minority rights and act as a mediator between the Roma communities and local and central levels of the government administration to assure adequate and efficient rights based policies towards Roma. Their credo is that promotion and protection of Roma minority human rights will results in integration based on cultural, religious, linguistic and ethnical pluralism, in majority–minority relationships. In their work, they use the human rights based approach understood as: a bottom-up approach focusing on offering opportunities, empowerment, and creation of security in development. Creation of an asset towards vulnerable and marginalized social groups through efforts in solving inequality based on ethnicity, gender, and social and cultural differences.

The organization has approached several cases of Roma rights violations using administrative litigation and reconciliation approaches and successfully promoted Roma for inclusion in the municipal and local levels of governmental administration as public officials.

NGO Roma Together work is being appreciated by help from the Office of the United Nations High Commissioner for Human Rights with whom they have implemented a community-led training, which was one of the fewest engagement of this human rights UN agency at the local grassroots level. The workshop results in empowerment of local Romani communities to equally participate in the decision-making process on Municipality level.
