= American Polish Advisory Council =

US non-profit organization

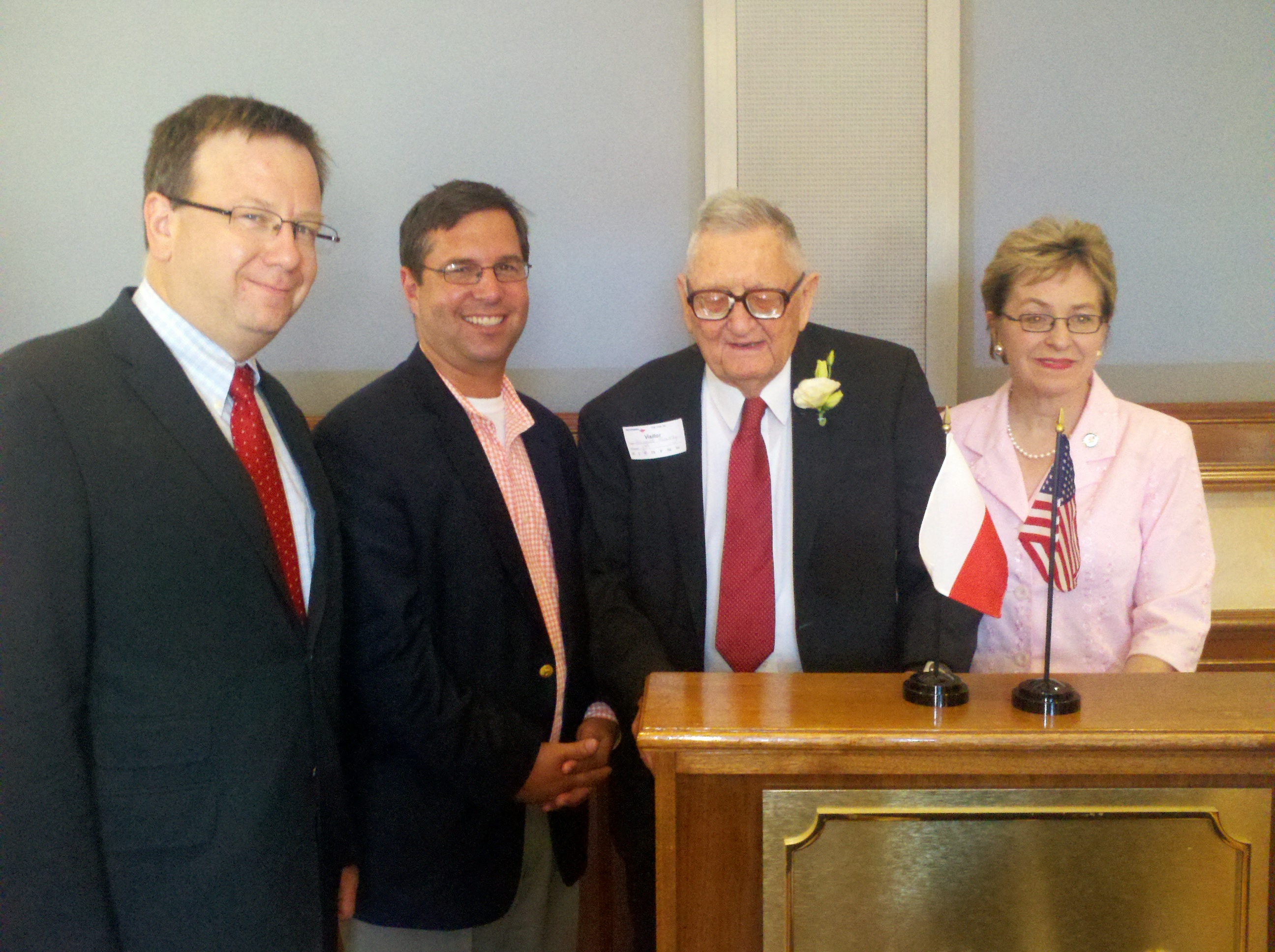
APAC Reception, 2012 at Washington, DC

The American Polish Advisory Council (APAC) was a 501(c)(4) organization registered in Washington, DC, dedicated to improving the visibility of Polish-Americans in public affairs and politics.

== History ==
When it was founded in 2002, the president of the bi-partisan organization was former ambassador to Poland Nicholas Rey and its vice president was lieutenant general, former ambassador and Chief US negotiator for arms control Edward L. Rowny. The organization founding members were Mark Brzezinski, Joe Macielag, Zbig Cymerman, Susan Bysiewicz, Marilyn Piurek, Bogdan Lodyga, Dr. Michael Szporer, Al Koproski Paul Saydek, Thaddeus Kontek Radek Sikorski and Dr. John Micgiel.

With the passing of long-time President Gen. Edward L. Rowny on December 21, 2017, APAC ceased operations as announced on their official website.

== Activities ==
In past national elections, the organization was instrumental in putting together the Polish American Agenda, a consolidated platform of issues important to the community. In 2004, the Platform was signed by over 300 organizations nationwide and presented to presidential candidates, John Kerry and George W. Bush, alongside a forum for American Polonia leaders. In 2012, the Platform was presented to surrogates of the Romney and Obama campaigns during the Polish American Conference held in Washington, DC, in late in September 2012.

APAC Honorary Democratic Co-chair is Rep.Marcy Kaptur and Secretary of Defense Chuck Hagel is the Republican Honorary Co-chair. Edward L. Rowny is the current president of APAC. William Schreiber manages the organization's Washington, DC offices at 2025 O Street NW. The current APAC Board of Directors includes two vice presidents, Ian Brzezinski and Dr. Michael Szporer, Beata Debek, treasurer, Darek Barcikowski [secretary], Agnes Marczak (political director), Agnes Ptasznik, Robert Hryniewicz, Thaddeus Kontek, Anna Goral, Dr. Karen Majewski, William Schreiber, Dr.Suzanne Lotarski and Lukasz Cholodecki.

The American Polish Advisory Council held a first annual Polish American Conference September 29, 2012, in Washington, DC. It was attended by many aspirants for public office, national and local political figures, among them Republican presidential candidate Newt Gingrich and his wife Calista, and head of pro-Obama Priorities USA super PAC Bill Burton, former Connecticut state secretary Susan Bysiewicz, among others. The Conference presented the Polish American Agenda for 2012 Elections to representatives from the Republican and Democratic parties. Poland was represented by its new ambassador to United States Ryszard Schnepf.

== Conferences ==
October 10, 2015 - Atlantic Council, Washington, D.C. December 2014 - Yale University, New Haven, CT.

== See also ==
Polish-American vote
