= Nansen Dialogue Centre Skopje =

Nansen Dialogue Centre Skopje is an NGO based in Skopje, Macedonia which was founded in 2000. It won the 2011 Max van der Stoel Award from the Netherlands and OSCE High Commissioner on National Minorities. Its mission is to support intercultural and interethnic dialogue processes with the aim of contributing to conflict prevention, reconciliation and peace building through program activities, in particular in education.

Nansen Dialogue Center Skopje is a local non-governmental and non-profit organization, established in 2000 supported by the Nansen Academy from Lillehammer, Norway. NDC Skopje is part of the Nansen Dialogue Network that consists of Nansen Dialogue Centers in the Western Balkans and the Nansen Academy in Norway. Nansen Dialogue Network is a member of the European Peace Building Liaison Office.

== Donor ==
The main donor of NDC Skopje is the Ministry of Foreign Affairs (Norway), as well as the Embassy of the Kingdom of Norway in Skopje, Macedonia.

== Background ==
Upon the establishment of the Nansen Dialogue Center Skopje in the year 2000, the focus of the organization was mainly on students, young politicians, representatives of non-governmental organizations and primary schools students in Macedonia. The goal of the activities was to give the participants skills for non-violent communication, leading dialogue, conflict analysis and to enable them to understand the difference between dialogue and a debate.

In 2001, the activities were extended on a regional level by organizing several seminars and forums with young leaders and politicians from Serbia, Kosovo, Bosnia and Herzegovina, Montenegro and Croatia. NDC Skopje program activities have also included several journalists from Macedonia.

After the end of the conflict in Macedonia and signing the Framework Peace Agreement in August 2001, NDC Skopje has focused its activities towards promoting the Framework Peace Agreement and has continued to work with young people from the areas mostly affected by the conflict. In cooperation with OSCE, several dialogue sessions were organized with young people from Tetovo. Also, tribunes with young politicians were intensified, both on local and regional level.

In 2003 and 2004, the focus of the program activities was put on strengthening the capacities of the political parties i.e. the youth branches of the political parties. Four “Schools for young politicians” were created where 85 young politicians took part. Each school lasted 25 days. University professors from Macedonia and abroad, as well as part of the leaders of the political parties in Macedonia, took the role of lecturers in those schools.

In 2005, after adopting the Law on territorial division of the local self-governments, NDC Skopje has started the implementation of the program “Dialogue and reconciliation” in 2005 in Municipality of Jegunovce, which is located in the Northwestern part of Macedonia. NDC Skopje has chosen the Municipality of Jegunovce, because it was mostly affected by the armed conflict in 2001. As a direct consequence of the conflict, ethnically based segregation of the primary schools started in this Municipality in 2002.

Through dialogue seminars and trainings on communication, cooperation, tolerance, teamwork and peaceful conflict resolution, conditions have been created for opening of six cabinets where students in mixed ethnic composition attended bilingual courses in IT, English, Macedonian and Albanian language. Each year, the courses have been attended by approximately 200 students. The program was implemented through the year 2008 when the conditions were created for opening the first integrated primary school “Fridtjof Nansen” in the village Preljubishte, Municipality of Jegunovce. In 2010, the first integrated secondary school “Mosha Pijade” was officially open in village Preljubishte. Based on the previous success, the project was expanded in the municipality of Strumica, where the first integrated classrooms were established in November 2010. Starting from the school year September 2011/2012 NDC Skopje has signed partnership agreements and will implement the Integrated Education programs in two more primary schools/municipalities: “Rajko Zinzifov” Cair, and “Goce Delcev” Municipality of Vasilevo.
