= Minority group =

Sociological/demographic category

The term "minority group" has different meanings, depending on the context. According to common usage, it can be defined simply as a group in society with the lowest number of individuals, or less than half of a population. Usually a minority group is disempowered relative to the majority, and that characteristic lends itself to different applications of the term minority.

In terms of sociology, economics, and politics, a demographic that takes up the smallest fraction of the population is not necessarily labelled the "minority" if it wields dominant power. In the academic context, the terms "minority" and "majority" are used in terms of hierarchical power structures. For example, in South Africa, during Apartheid, white Europeans held virtually all social, economic, and political power over black Africans. For this reason, black Africans are the "minority group", despite the fact that they outnumber white Europeans in South Africa. This is why academics more frequently use the term "minority group" to refer to a category of people who experience relative disadvantage, as compared to members of a dominant social group. To address this ambiguity, Harris Mylonas has proposed the term "non-core group", instead of "minority group", to refer to any aggregation of individuals that is perceived as an unassimilated ethnic group (on a linguistic, religious, physical, or ideological basis) by the ruling political elite of a country" and reserves the term 'minority' only for groups that have been granted minority rights by their state of residence.

Minority group membership is typically based on differences in observable characteristics or practices, such as: ethnicity (ethnic minority), race (racial minority), religion (religious minority), sexual orientation (sexual minority), or disability. The framework of intersectionality can be used to recognize that an individual may simultaneously hold membership in multiple minority groups (e.g. both a racial and religious minority). Likewise, individuals may also be part of a minority group in regard to some characteristics, but part of a dominant group in regard to others.

The term "minority group" often occurs within the discourse of civil rights and collective rights, as members of minority groups are prone to differential treatment in the countries and societies in which they live. Minority group members often face discrimination in multiple areas of social life, including housing, employment, healthcare, and education, among others. While discrimination may be committed by individuals, it may also occur through structural inequalities, in which rights and opportunities are not equally accessible to all. Those in favour of minority rights often pursue laws designed to protect minority groups from discrimination and afford members of the minority group equal social status and legal protections as held by members of the dominant group.

== Definitions ==
In the 19th century, the term "minority" primarily referred to political parties in national legislatures. The term minority referred to a range of groups, including the better-educated and better-off who were worried of being swamped by broadening franchise (voting rights). As Jenifer Hart put it, "those who have" felt threatened by "those who want".; the less-popular party in a two-party contest, who should not have control or power but in many electoral systems is able to do so.; and a least-popular "third party" as workers, farmers and socialists enter into electoral politics and receive substantial support, and thereby should have representation but in many electoral systems do not.

This changed with the Paris Peace Conference (1919–1920), when the term "minority" was applied to ethnic, national, linguistic and religious groups who made up less than half of the population of a state, "groups of persons who differ in race, religion or language from the majority of the inhabitants of the country." The Paris Conference has been attributed with coining the concept of minority rights and bringing prominence to it. The League of Nations Minorities Commission in 1919 defined members of a minority as "nationals belonging to racial, religious, or linguistic minorities". Protection of minority groups, such as through careful drawing of boundaries of states and proportional representation, was seen as integral in preventing causes of future wars.

=== Sociological ===
Louis Wirth defined a minority group as "a group of people who, because of their physical or cultural characteristics, are singled out from the others in the society in which they live for differential and unequal treatment, and who therefore regard themselves as objects of collective discrimination". The definition includes both objective and subjective criteria: membership of a minority group is objectively ascribed by society, based on an individual's physical or behavioral characteristics; it is also subjectively applied by its members, who may use their status as the basis of group identity or solidarity. Thus, minority group status is categorical: an individual who exhibits the physical or behavioral characteristics of a given minority group is accorded the status of that group and is subject to the same treatment as other members of that group.

Joe Feagin, states that a minority group has five characteristics: (1) suffering discrimination and subordination, (2) physical and/or cultural traits that set them apart, and which are disapproved by the dominant group, (3) a shared sense of collective identity and common burdens, (4) socially shared rules about who belongs and who does not determine minority status, and (5) tendency to marry within the group.

==== Criticisms ====
There is a controversy with the use of the word minority, as it has a generic and an academic usage. Common usage of the term indicates a statistical minority; however, academics refer to power differences among groups rather than differences in population size among groups.

Such use of the term minority is based on the idea that a group can be considered a minority even if it includes such a large number of people that it is numerically not a minority in society.

Some sociologists have criticized the concept of "minority/majority", arguing this language excludes or neglects changing or unstable cultural identities, as well as cultural affiliations across national boundaries. As such, the term historically excluded groups (HEGs) is often similarly used to highlight the role of historical oppression and domination, and how this results in the under-representation of particular groups in various areas of social life.

=== Political ===
The term national minority is often used to discuss minority groups in international and national politics. All countries contain some degree of racial, ethnic, or linguistic diversity. In addition, minorities may also be immigrant, indigenous or landless nomadic communities. This often results in variations in language, culture, beliefs, practices, that set some groups apart from the dominant group. As these differences are usually perceived negatively, this results in loss of social and political power for members of minority groups.

There is no legal definition of national minorities in international law, though protection of minority groups is outlined by the United Nations Declaration on the Rights of Persons Belonging to National or Ethnic, Religious and Linguistic Minorities. International criminal law can protect the rights of racial or ethnic minorities in several ways. The right to self-determination is a key issue. The Council of Europe regulates minority rights in the European Charter for Regional or Minority Languages and the Framework Convention for the Protection of National Minorities.

In some places, subordinate ethnic groups may constitute a numerical majority, such as Blacks in South Africa under apartheid. In the United States, for example, non-Hispanic Whites constitute the majority (58.4%) and all other racial and ethnic groups (Central and South Americans, African Americans, Asian Americans, American Indian, and Native Hawaiians) are classified as "minorities". If the non-Hispanic White population falls below 50% the group will only be the plurality, not the majority.

== Examples ==
=== Racial and ethnic minorities ===
Racial minorities, sometimes referred to synonymously as people of color or non-white people, are minority groups that are discriminated against on the basis of race. Though definitions vary cross-culturally, modern racism is primarily based on the European and American classifications of race that developed during the Age of Exploration, as European countries sought to categorize the nations they colonized into pseudo-scientific phenotypical groups. In the United States's system, whiteness is at the top of a hierarchy that automatically classifies mixed-race individuals as their subordinate race.

Sometimes, racist policies explicitly codified pseudo-scientific definitions of race: such as the United States' one-drop rule and blood quantum laws, South Africa's apartheid, and Nazi Germany Nuremberg race laws. Other times, race has been a matter of self-identification, with de facto racist policies implemented. In addition to governmental policy, racism may persist as social prejudice and discrimination.

There are also social groups that are usually identified through ethnicity. Like race, ethnicity is largely determined hereditarily. However, it can also be influenced by factors such as adoption, cultural assimilation, religious conversion, and language shift. As race and ethnicity often overlap, many ethnic minorities are also racial minorities. However, this is not always the case, and some people are ethnic minorities while also being classified as white, such as some Jews, Roma, and Sámi. In some cases, their ethnic identities have been seen as negating their whiteness, in both inter- and intra-group identification.

In some countries, such as the United Kingdom, there is a preference to categorise people by ethnicity instead of race. Ethnicity encompasses a mix of "long shared cultural experiences, religious practices, traditions, ancestry, language, dialect or national origins". The United Kingdom considers everyone but white British people to be an ethnic minority, including other white Europeans such as White Irish people (excluding in Northern Ireland).

=== National minorities ===
The term "national minority" has been understood differently and individual states have been allowed to determine what they recognise as a national minority. Thus, the European Framework Convention for the Protection of National Minorities does not define "national minority". Nevertheless, in the context of the Conference on Security and Cooperation in Europe and the Organization for Security and Cooperation in Europe, the term "national minority" has generally been understood to mean a population of a certain nationality/ethnicity that is numerically a minority within a state but that has the same nationality/ethnicity as the numerical majority in another state.

=== Involuntary minorities ===
Also known as "castelike minorities", involuntary minorities are a term for people who were originally brought into any society against their will. In the United States, for instance, it includes but is not limited to Native Americans, Native Hawaiians, Puerto Ricans, African Americans, and in the 1800s, native-born Hispanics.

=== Voluntary minorities ===
Immigrants take on minority status in their new country, usually in hopes of a better future economically, educationally, and politically than in their homeland. Because of their focus on success, voluntary minorities are more likely to do better in school than other migrating minorities. Adapting to a very different culture and language makes difficulties in the early stages of life in the new country. Voluntary immigrants do not experience a sense of divided identity as much as involuntary minorities and are often rich in social capital because of their educational ambitions. Major immigrant groups in the United States include Mexicans, Central and South Americans, Cubans, Africans, East Asians, and South Asians.

=== Gender and sexuality minorities ===
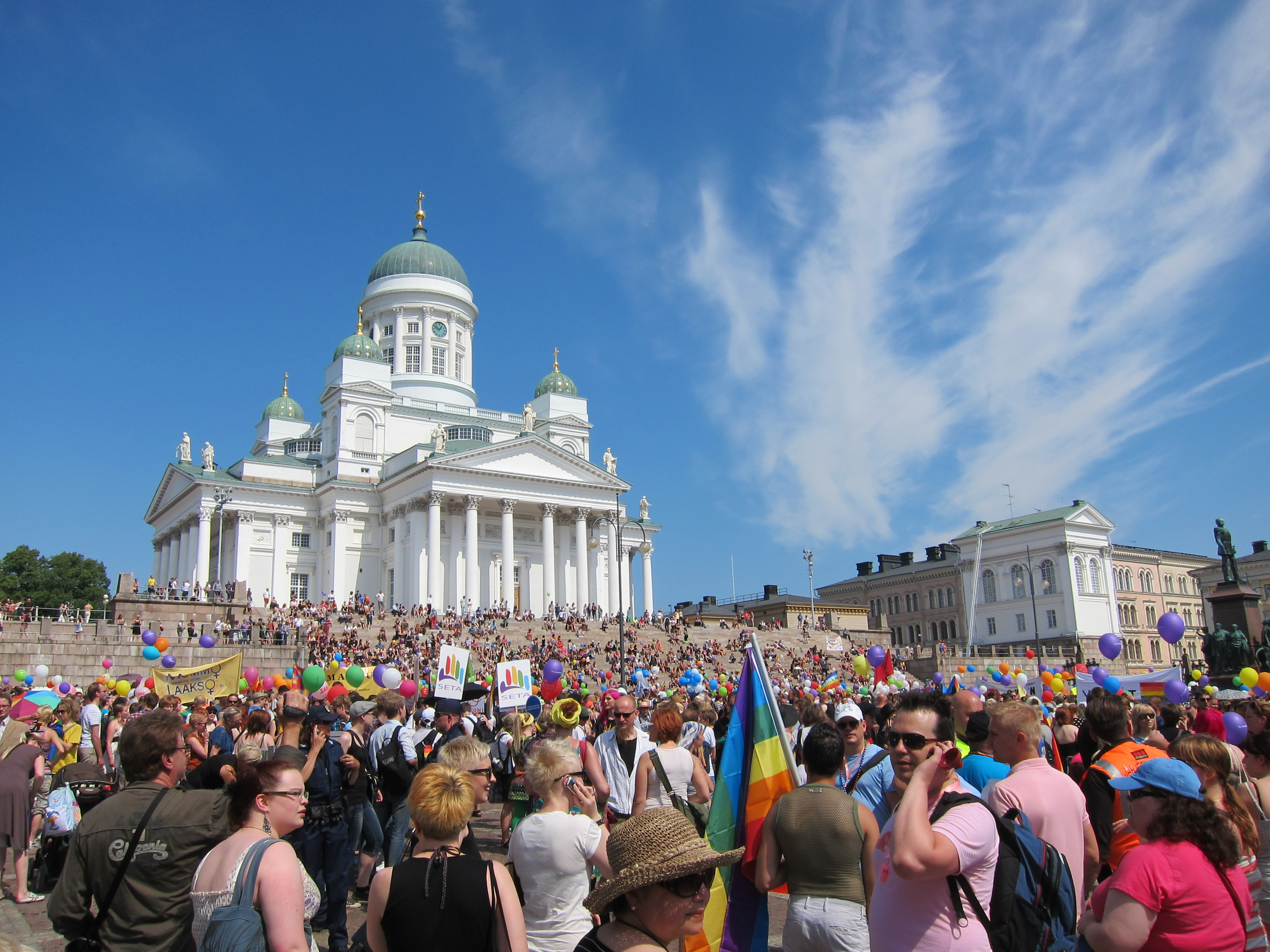
Pride events are held annually around the world for sexual minorities. In picture, people gathering at the Senate Square, Helsinki, right before the 2011 Helsinki Pride parade started.

The term sexual minority is frequently used by public health researchers to recognize a wide variety of individuals who engage in same-sex sexual behavior, including those who do not identify under the LGBTQ+ umbrella. For example, men who have sex with men (MSM), but do not identify as gay. In addition, the term gender minorities can include many types of gender variant people, such as intersex people, transgender people, or non-binary individuals. However, the terms sexual and gender minority are often not preferred by LGBTQ+ people, as they represent clinical categories rather than individual identity.

Though lesbian, gay, bisexual, transgender, and queer (LGBTQ+) people have existed throughout human history, they represent a numerical and social minority. They experience numerous social inequalities stemming from their group membership as LGBTQ+ people. LGBTQ+ rights movements across many western countries led to the recognition of LGBTQ+ people as members of a minority group. These inequalities include social discrimination and isolation, unequal access to healthcare, employment, and housing, and experience negative mental and physical health outcomes due to these experiences.

=== Disabled people ===
Leading up to the Human Rights Act 1998 in the UK, a rise in the awareness relating to how disabled people were being treated began. Many started to believe that they were being denied basic human rights. This act had a section that stated if authorities did not protect people with learning disabilities from others' actions, such as harm or neglect, then they could be prosecuted.

The disability rights movement has contributed to an understanding of disabled people as a minority or a coalition of minorities who are disadvantaged by society, not just as people who are disadvantaged by their impairments. Advocates of disability rights emphasize the difference in physical or psychological functioning rather than inferiority. For example, some autistic people argue for acceptance of neurodiversity, much as opponents of racism argue for acceptance of ethnic diversity. The deaf community is often regarded as a linguistic and cultural minority rather than a group with disabilities, and some deaf people do not see themselves as having a disability at all. Rather, they are disadvantaged by technologies and social institutions designed to cater to the dominant group. (See the Convention on the Rights of Persons with Disabilities.)

=== Religious minorities ===
People belonging to religious minorities have a faith that is different from that held by the majority. Most countries of the world have religious minorities. It is now widely accepted in the West that people should have the freedom to choose their religion, including the right to convert from one religion to another, or not to have any religion (atheism and/or agnosticism). However, in many countries, this freedom is constricted. In Egypt, a new system of identity cards requires all citizens to state their religion—and the only choices are Islam, Christianity, or Judaism (See Egyptian identification card controversy).

=== Women as a disadvantaged group ===
In most societies, numbers of men and women are roughly equal. Though women are not considered to be a minority, the status of women, as a subordinate group, has led to many social scientists to refer to them as a disadvantaged group. Though women's legal rights and status vary widely across countries, women often experience social inequalities, relative to men, in various societies. Women are sometimes denied access to education and access to the same opportunities as men, especially in under-developed countries.

== Law and government ==
In the politics of some countries, a "minority" is an ethnic group recognized by law, and having specified rights. Speakers of a legally recognized minority language, for instance, might have the right to education or communication with the government in their mother tongue. Countries with special provisions for minorities include Canada, China, Ethiopia, Germany, India, the Netherlands, Poland, Romania, Russia, Croatia, and the United Kingdom.

The various minority groups in a country are often not given equal treatment. Some groups are too small or indistinct to obtain minority protections. For example, a member of a particularly small ethnic group might be forced to check "Other" on a checklist of different backgrounds and so might receive fewer privileges than a member of a more defined group.

Many contemporary governments prefer to assume the people they rule all belong to the same nationality rather than separate ones based on ethnicity. The United States asks for race and ethnicity on its official census forms, which thus breaks up and organizes its population into sub-groups, primarily racial rather than national. Spain does not divide its nationals by ethnic group or national minorities, although it does maintain an official notion of minority languages, that is one of the criteria for to determine a national minority, upon the Framework Convention for the Protection of National Minorities.

Some especially significant or powerful minorities receive comprehensive protection and political representation. For example, the former Yugoslav Republic of Bosnia and Herzegovina recognizes the three constitutive nations, none of which constitutes a numerical majority (see nations of Bosnia and Herzegovina). However, other minorities such as Roma and Jews, are officially labelled "foreign" and are excluded from many of these protections. For example, they may be excluded from political positions, including the presidency.

There is debate over recognizing minority groups and their privileges. One view is that the application of special rights to minority groups may harm some countries, such as new states in Africa or Latin America not founded on the European nation-state model, since minority recognition may interfere with establishing a national identity. It may hamper the integration of the minority into mainstream society, perhaps leading to separatism or supremacism. In Canada, some feel that the failure of the dominant English-speaking majority to integrate French Canadians has provoked Quebec separatism.

Others assert that minorities require specific protections to ensure that they are not marginalized: for example, bilingual education may be needed to allow linguistic minorities to fully integrate into the school system and compete equally in society. In this view, rights for minorities strengthen the nation-building project, as members of minorities see their interests well served, and willingly accept the legitimacy of the nation and their integration (not assimilation) within it.

== See also ==
- Dominant minority
- Ethnic penalty
- Identity politics
- Intangible cultural heritage
- Interminority racism
- List of active NGOs of national minorities
- List of minority political parties
- Middleman minority
- Minoritarianism
- Minority influence
- Minority language
- Minority (philosophy)
- Minority religion
- Minority Rights Group International
- Model minority
- Racial Minorities in STEM Fields
- Serge Moscovici
- Social exclusion
- Social stratification
- Social vulnerability
- Tokenism
- Underrepresented group
