= Can-can (disambiguation) =

The can-can is a dance.

Can-Can may also refer to:

- Can Can (band), American punk rock band
- Can-Can (musical), a 1953 musical
  - Can-Can (film), a 1960 film based on the musical
    - Can-Can (soundtrack), a 1960 album featuring the soundtrack to the film
- Can Can, a fragrance designed by Paris Hilton
- "Galop Infernal", a movement of Offenbach's Orpheus in the Underworld commonly associated with and called the can-can
- "Can Can" (Bad Manners song), 1981 single by the band Bad Manners
- Can Can (album), a 2006 live album by Bad Manners
- French Cancan, 1955 French-Italian musical film
