= The World Congress of the Nations of Georgia =

The World Congress of the Nations of Georgia — public association of Georgians, living in Georgia and abroad; established in March 2009.

== Leadership and structure ==
Headquarters located in Vienna, Austria. Russian branch based in St. Petersburg.

President Alexander Ebralidze — Russian businessman, general director of JSC "Taleon".

Vice-president Badri Meladze — director deputy on security in state unitary enterprise "Stolichnye apteki", Moscow.

Vice-president Vladimir Khomeriki — council of the President of the Innovation and Investment State Academy of Russia.

Director of the Russian branch — Alexander Kinteraya.

== Fields of activity ==
- The official statement of the Congress outlines the goal of leading Georgia out of critical situation into the path of stable democratic development, creation of united, neutral, thriving and free democratic Georgia. There was proposed a motion of a voluntary resignation of Mikheil Saakashvili from the post of President of Georgia.
- The online conference Regnum outlined plans to open Georgian branch of the Congress in Tbilisi, create own newspaper, radio station and a TV channel.
- 14 May 2009 at the World Conference of the Peoples of Georgia in Sochi Alexander Ebralidze, the president of the Congress, declared his will to enter the race for President of Georgia.
