= Chechnya Advocacy Network =

U.S.-based advocacy organization

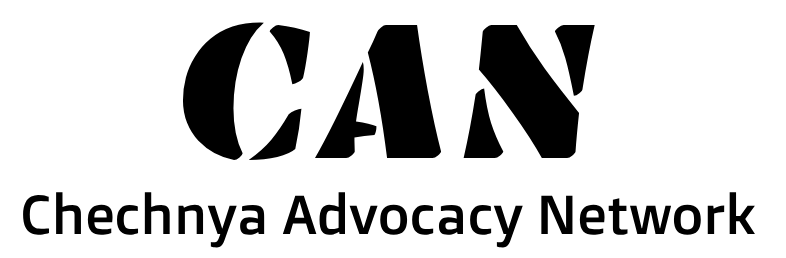
- Founder: Albina Digaeva
- Type: Non-profit, NGO
- Headquarters: New York City, U.S.
- Region served: Chechnya
- Website: www.chechnyaadvocacy.org

Chechnya Advocacy Network (CAN) is a United States-based non-government organization that conducts research, awareness, and advocacy on Chechnya and the Chechen people. It is the largest Chechnya-specific organization in North America. Its headquarters is located in New York City, with branch offices in Washington, DC, Portland, Seattle and San Francisco. Co-founders of this organization include the former United Nations worker Almut Rochowanski and prominent Chechen-American Albina Digaeva.

According to the organization's website, the goals of Chechnya Advocacy Network are "the well-being of people living in Chechnya, the North Caucasus region and migrants from that region elsewhere in Russia and around the world." The organization has been calling for an improvement of the human rights situation in the North Caucasus, an end to armed violence in the region, end to racial discrimination against ethnic Chechens, consideration of refugee resettlement in U.S. for Chechen refugees, and increased humanitarian aid to the region. The organization is apolitical in its stance on the First and Second Chechen Wars, saying it is neither pro-Russian nor pro-independence.
