= List of Canadians of Polish descent =

This is a partial list of notable Canadians of full or partial Polish ancestral or national descent.

== Business ==
- Moses Znaimer, broadcasting executive
- Mik Kersten, computer engineer
- Nelson Skalbania, businessman, engineer
- Piotr Szulczewski, founder of Wish

== Science and engineering ==
- Casimir Gzowski – engineer who worked on Welland Canal, New York & Erie Railway (first Commissioner of the Niagara Parks Commission)
- Leon Katz, FRSC (1909–2004) – Officer of the Order of Canada, Professor University of Saskatchewan, physicist
- Karol Józef Krótki, FRSC – demography professor, statistician
- Witold Rybczynski – architect, professor and writer
- Lucas Skoczkowski – founder and CEO of Redknee
- Adam Skorek – professor of electrical and computer engineering
- Stanley Skoryna, FACS – physician and researcher, leader of the Medical Expedition to Easter Island (METEI)
- Nicole Tomczak-Jaegermann, FRSC – mathematics professor
- Janusz Żurakowski – Battle of Britain fighter pilot

== Education ==
- Albert Bandura – psychologist, professor
- Isaac Hellmuth – from Warsaw, via England; one of the founders of the University of Western Ontario
- Conrad Swan – descended from Polish noble family, Swiecicki; first Canadian appointed to the College of Arms in London

== Politics ==
- Natalia Kusendova-Bashta – Minister of Long-Term Care of Ontario, MPP Mississauga centre (2018–Present)
- Leon Crestohl – former Liberal MP, Cartier, (1950–1963)
- Bonnie Crombie – former Liberal MP, Mississauga—Streetsville (2008–2011), Mayor of Mississauga, Ontario (2014–present)
- Jan Dukszta – former Ontario NDP MPP, Parkdale (1971–1981)
- Gary Filmon – former Premier of Manitoba (1988–1999), Manitoba PC MLA, River Heights (1979–1981) and Tuxedo (1981–2000)
- Jesse Flis – former Liberal MP Parkdale—High Park (1979–1984; 1988–1997)
- Casimir Gzowski – Acting Lieutenant Governor of Ontario (1896–1897)
- Stanley Haidasz – former Liberal MP for Trinity (1957–1958) and Parkdale (1962–1978); Minister of State for Multiculturalism (1972–1974); Senator (1978–1998)
- Andrew Kania – former Liberal Member of Parliament for Brampton West (2008–2011)
- Lindy Kasperski – Legislative Assembly for Saskatchewan (1995–2003)
- Irek Kusmierczyk – former Liberal Member of Parliament for Windsor-Tecumseh (2019–2025)
- Stan Kazmierczak Keyes – former national chair of Liberal Party of Canada (2002–2004); Liberal MP Hamilton West (1988–2004); Minister of National Revenue, Minister of State (Sport), Minister Responsible for the Canada Post Corporation and Minister Responsible for the Royal Canadian Mint (2003–2004)
- Alexandre-Édouard Kierzkowski – former Liberal MP St. Hyacinthe (1867–1870), First MP of Polish Descent
- Tom Kmiec – Conservative MP, Calgary Shepard (2015–present)
- Chris Korwin-Kuczynski – former Toronto city councillor (1981–2003)
- Ken Kowalski – former Deputy Premier of Alberta (1992–1994), former Alberta Government Minister, Speaker of the Legislative Assembly of Alberta (1997–2012), Alberta PC MLA (1979–2012)
- Wladyslaw Lizon – former Conservative MP for Mississauga East-Cooksville (2011–2015) and former president of the Canadian Polish Congress (2005–2010)
- Thomas Lukaszuk – former Deputy Premier of Alberta (2012–2013), former Alberta Government Minister (2010–2014), and PC MLA for Edmonton-Castle Downs (2001–2015)
- Gary Malkowski – former Ontario NDP MPP, York East (1990–1995), Canada's first deaf parliamentarian
- Don Mazankowski – former Deputy Prime Minister for Brian Mulroney (1986–1993), former federal government Minister (1979–1980; 1984–1993), Progressive Conservative MP Vegreville (1968–1993)
- Peter Milczyn – former Member of Toronto City Council (2000–2014), current Liberal MPP Etobicoke—Lakeshore (2013–2018)
- Ted Opitz – former Conservative MP for Etobicoke Centre (2011–2015)
- Eleanor Olszewski – Member of Parliament for Edmonton Centre
- Artur Pawlowski - Pastor and Calgary political candidate
- Fred Rose – former Labor-Progressive (Communist) MP Cartier (1943–1947); only MP ever convicted of spying for a foreign country, his capture as a Soviet spy helped to start the Cold War
- John Yakabuski – Ontario Progressive Conservative MPP Renfrew—Nipissing—Pembroke (2003–present), son of Paul Yakabuski
- Paul Yakabuski – former Ontario Progressive Conservative MPP, (1963–1987), father of John Yakabuski
- Ed Ziemba – former Ontario NDP MPP, High Park—Swansea (1975–1981), brother-in-law of Elaine Ziemba
- Elaine Ziemba – former Ontario NDP MPP, High Park—Swansea (1990–1995), sister-in-law of Ed Ziemba
- Natalia Kusendova - Bashta – Minister of Long Term Care, Mississauga - centre

== Music ==
- Roma Baran – record producer
- Dan Bryk – singer-songwriter
- Walter Buczynski – composer
- Basia Bulat – singer-songwriter
- Clarice Carson – singer
- Anna Cyzon – singer-songwriter
- Janina Fialkowska – pianist, born in Montreal
- Anna-Marie Globenski – pianist
- Steve Jocz – drummer for Sum 41
- Ben Kowalewicz – lead singer for Billy Talent
- Todd Kowalski – bassist and singer
- Geddy Lee – bassist, keyboardist and lead vocalist for Rush
- Jan Lisiecki – pianist-virtuoso, born in Calgary
- Margaret Maye – singer and actress
- Mike Reno – musician and the lead singer for Loverboy
- Andrzej Rozbicki – conductor
- Tyler Shaw - musician
- Daniel Wnukowski – pianist
- Christina Petrowska Quilico - pianist

== Culture and media ==
- Andrzej Busza – poet
- Ann Charney – novelist, short story writer, journalist
- Melvin Charney – artist, architect
- Bogdan Czaykowski – poet, translator, essayist
- Alex Debogorski – veteran ice road trucker on the television series Ice Road Truckers
- Louis Dudek - poet
- Peter Gzowski – broadcaster, writer and reporter
- Karol Ike – photographer and cinematographer
- Wacław Iwaniuk – poet in Polish, literary critic and essayist
- Cody Ko – YouTuber, podcaster, comedian
- Frances Kruk – poet
- Jacqueline Milczarek – journalist, news anchor
- Anne Mroczkowski – journalist, news anchor
- Estanislao (Stan) Oziewicz – journalist, The Globe and Mail
- Antoni Porowski - cook, actor, model, author
- George Radwanski – editor-in-chief of the Toronto Star
- Chava Rosenfarb – novelist, poet in Yiddish, wife of Henry Morgentaler
- Adam Smoluk – director, screenwriter and actor
- Eva Stachniak – writer
- Mark Starowicz – head of CBC Television Documentary Programming unit, journalist and TV producer
- Alexandra Szacka – CBC/Radio-Canada correspondent
- Jack L. Warner - film executive, co-founder of Warner Bros, born to Polish Jewish parents

== Actors ==
- August Ames (Mercedes Grabowski) – pornographic actress
- Magda Apanowicz – actress
- Carolina Bartczak - actress
- Lara Jean Chorostecki – actress
- John Candy - actor, comedian; John's mother Evangeline Candy (née Aker), was of Polish descent
- Lara Jean Chorostecki – actress
- Claire Corlett – actress
- James Cunningham – comedian
- Henry Czerny – actor
- Paloma Kwiatkowski – actress
- Tatiana Maslany – actress
- Craig Olejnik – actor
- Andrew Pifko - actor
- Cara Pifko - actress
- Lisa Ray – actress
- Devon Sawa – actor
- Veronika Slowikowska – actress, comedian

== Military ==
- Maximilien Globensky – War of 1812 veteran
- Andrew Charles Mynarski VC – Second World War airman
- Walter J. Natynczyk – Chief of the Defence Staff of the Canadian Forces
- Ferdinand-Alphonse Oklowski – Colonel
- Stefan Sznuk – Major General

== Sports ==
- Kayla Adamek – soccer player for the Ottawa Rapid
- Sebastian Breza - soccer player for CF Montreal
- Turk Broda – ice hockey goalie
- Stephanie Bukovec – soccer player for Calgary Wild FC
- Édouard Carpentier – professional wrestler
- Dustin Cherniawski – CFL player
- Shane Churla – player, NHL
- Peter Czerwinski – competitive eater and bodybuilder
- Gabriela Dabrowski – professional tennis player
- Marek Deska – baseball player
- Bishop Dolegiewicz – track and field athlete
- Sebastian Dzikowski – soccer player for Flota Świnoujście
- Adam Fantilli - ice hockey centre
- Wayne Gretzky – hockey legend
- Adam Henrique – ice hockey centre
- Chris Horodecki – mixed martial artist
- Mark Jankowski – ice hockey centre
- Frank Jerwa - ice hockey left wing
- Joe Jerwa - ice hockey defenseman
- Alexandra Kamieniecki – figure skater
- Adam Kaminski – volleyball player
- Zeno Karcz – CFL player
- Gene Kiniski – CFL player
- Kelly Kiniski – professional wrestler
- Nick Kiniski – professional wrestler
- Matt Klinger – tennis player
- Michael Klukowski – soccer player for Club Brugge
- Eryk Kobza – soccer player for Cavalry FC
- Zenon Konopka - ice hockey centre
- Corey Koskie - major league baseball third base player
- Walter "Killer" Kowalski – professional wrestler
- Joe Krol – Toronto Argonauts player
- Dawid Kwiek – soccer player
- Tomasz Kucharzewski – martial artist
- Aggie Kukulowicz – ice hockey centre
- Rhiannon Leier – swimmer
- Steve Ludzik – ice hockey centre
- Merlin Malinowski – ice hockey centre
- Ray Mariuz – CFL player
- Stan Mikawos – Winnipeg Blue Bombers player, CFL
- John Miszuk – ice hockey defenseman
- Danek Nowosielski – fencer
- Leszek Nowosielski – fencer
- Penny Oleksiak – Canadian National Team Swimmer
- Jamie Oleksiak – NHL Player Dallas Stars
- George Pakos – soccer player
- Ben Pakulski – professional bodybuilder
- Jim Peplinski – Calgary Flames, NHL
- Chris Pozniak – soccer player who currently plays for San Jose Earthquakes
- Tomasz Radzinski – soccer player
- Mark Rypien – NFL quarterback
- Jaclyn Sawicki – soccer player
- Krzysztof Soszynski – mixed martial artist
- Dave Stala – Hamilton Tiger-Cats player CFL
- Trish Stratus – WWE Diva
- John Tavares – ice hockey player for the Toronto Maple Leafs
- Larry Trader – played for Detroit, St. Louis, Montreal, 1982–1988
- Steve Wochy – ice hockey player
- Wojtek Wolski – player NHL
- Aleksandra Wozniak – professional tennis player
