= Embassy of Canada, Warsaw =

Diplomatic mission of Canada to Poland

Embassy of Canada to Poland
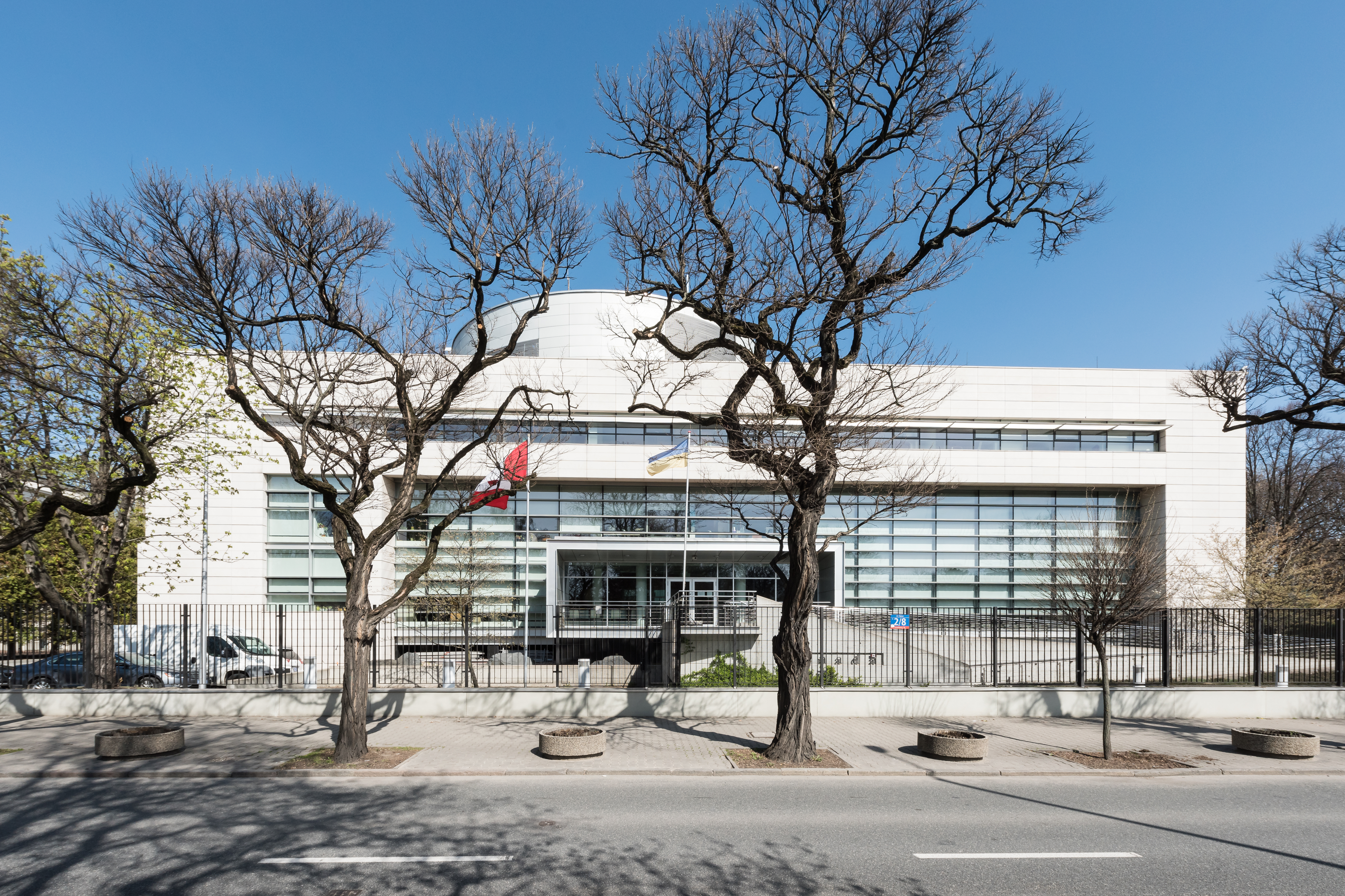
- Location: Warsaw, Poland
- Address: ulica Jana Matejki 1/5
- Coordinates: 52°13′29″N 21°01′34″E
- Ambassador: Catherine Godin
- Jurisdiction: Poland; Belarus
- Website: Official website

The Embassy of Canada to Poland (French: Ambassade du Canada en Pologne; Polish: Ambasada Kanady w Polsce) in Warsaw is the diplomatic mission of Canada to Poland. The embassy also covers the country of Belarus as part of its mandate. The embassy is located at ulica Jana Matejki 1/5 in Warsaw, down the street from the Polish Sejm.

== History ==
Embassy of Canada to Poland in 1970

Prior to 1970, the Embassy of Canada to Poland was located in a rented office on Katowicka Street. The initial embassy building was opened in 1970 at ulica Jana Matejki 1/5. From 1975 to 1990, the embassy also handled Canada's relations with the German Democratic Republic. The embassy has a perpetual lease on the grounds from the City of Warsaw.

Opened in 2001, the current facility designed by architect Voytek Gorczynski is more than double the size of the building it replaced, and it has won acclaim. The embassy was named Best Building of the Year in 2001 by Polish Business News, Best Public Building in 2002 by the City of Warsaw, and it received a special citation from the Association of Polish Architects for the Best Architectural Design in 2001.

The embassy's architectural design includes an emphasis on open spaces and natural light, which represent the Canadian values of transparency and openness. Expanding on these themes are a three-storey sky-lit lobby and a double-height multi-purpose room called the Canada Room, which is used for formal receptions and presentations. The building is three storeys in height, with a French limestone and aluminum exterior.

== The Two Rocks Monument ==
The Two Rocks Monument

The Two Rocks monument was unveiled in 1999 by the then Prime Ministers of Canada and Poland – Jean Chrétien and Jerzy Buzek. The inscription on the monument says: "These two rocks, one from Poland and the second from Canada, commemorate Polish and Canadian soldiers, who fought side by side during World War II." One rock originates from Wilno (Canada) and the other from the Kashubian region in Poland, symbolizing the coming together of the Canadian and Polish people.

On August 21, 2009, the Embassy of Canada to Poland commemorated the 65th anniversary of the Battle of Falaise in France, during which the allied forces of Canada and Poland defeated the German troops. Wreaths were laid by representatives of Canada’s Department of National Defence and by Polish veterans – participants of the Battle of Falaise - at the Two Rocks monument, situated in front of the Canadian Embassy in Warsaw.

== Embassy sections ==
The embassy is one of Canada's largest missions in Central and Eastern Europe, with approximately 13 Canada-based diplomats and 65 locally employed staff working at the chancery and the ambassador's official residence. Currently, there are five sections operating at the Embassy:

The Visa Section processes applications for temporary resident and permanent resident visas from citizens and residents of Belarus, Estonia, Latvia, Lithuania, Poland, Russia, Kazakhstan, Kyrgyzstan, Tajikistan, Turkmenistan and Uzbekistan.

The Trade Section promotes Canada's trade and economic interests in Poland, and supports Canadian companies and their products, services or technologies in the Polish market. This section also offers Polish clients assistance regarding investment and trade opportunities in Canada and will match their sourcing needs with appropriate Canadian products and services.

The Consular Section provides assistance to Canadians travelling, studying or residing in Poland and Belarus.

The Political, Economic, Cultural, Academic & Public Affairs Section has a broad scope of responsibilities in Poland, including promoting bilateral political and parliamentary relations, academic and educational relations, cultural relations, scientific cooperation, press/media, and public affairs. This section is also responsible for political relations with Belarus and International Experience Canada which is a youth mobility program between Canada and Poland.

The Canadian Defence Attaché Section covers military liaison between Canada and Poland, Estonia, Latvia, Lithuania, Slovakia and the Czech Republic.

== See also ==
- Canada–Poland relations
- Foreign relations of Canada
- Foreign relations of Poland
- Polish Canadians
- Diplomatic Missions of Canada
