= Max Kampelman =

American diplomat

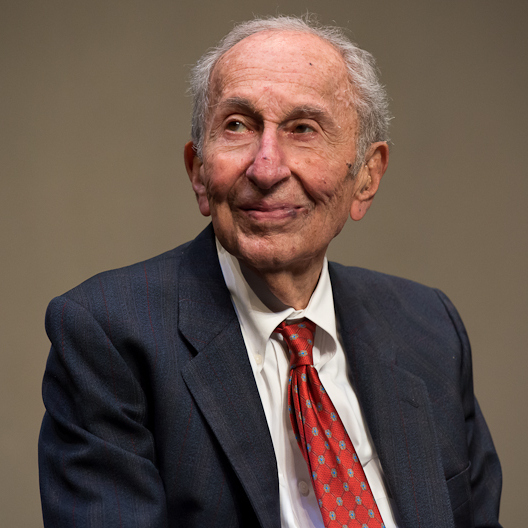

23rd Counselor of the United States Department of State
- In office July 15, 1987 – January 20, 1989
- President: Ronald Reagan
- Preceded by: Ed Derwinski
- Succeeded by: Robert Zoellick

Personal details
- Born: Max Kampelmacher; November 7, 1920 New York City, U.S.
- Died: January 25, 2013 (aged 92) Washington, D.C., U.S.
- Education: New York University; Bates College; University of Minnesota

Max Kampelman (born Max Kampelmacher; November 7, 1920 – January 25, 2013) was an American diplomat.

== Biography ==
Kampelman was born in New York, New York to Jewish Romanian immigrant parents on 7 November 1920. He grew up in the Bronx, New York, attending Jewish parochial schools and the Talmudical Academy High School. He received his B.A. from New York University in 1940 and LL.B., also from New York University, in 1947, and an honorary LL.D. from Bates College in 1986. At the University of Minnesota, he earned an M.A. in political science in 1946, an M.A. in public administration in 1947, and a Ph.D. in political science in 1952.

His career started during the Second World War as a conscientious objector. To fulfill his draft obligation, he volunteered for the Minnesota Starvation Experiment at the University of Minnesota undertaken by nutritionist Ancel Keys. Upon completing the one-year experiment, he renounced pacifism and went on to become a lawyer, diplomat and educator.

He served from 1949 to 1955 as Legislative Counsel to Minnesota Senator Hubert H. Humphrey.

Kampelman was chairman of the Washington public broadcasting radio and television stations from 1963 to 1970; and he hosted the PBS series Washington Week from 1969 to 1971.

He served as Ambassador to the Conference on Security and Cooperation in Europe from 1980 to 1983; Ambassador and Head of the United States Delegation to the Negotiations with the Soviet Union on Nuclear and Space Arms in Geneva from 1985 to 1989; and as Counselor to the United States Department of State from 1987 to 1989. He then rejoined the law firm of Fried, Frank, Harris, Shriver, & Jacobson LLP, where he was of counsel.

Kampelman was a member of the Board of Advisors for the think-tank Jewish Institute for National Security Affairs (JINSA). From 1958 to 1985 he served on the board of trustees of the Institute for American Universities, a non-profit study abroad organization for U.S. undergraduates in Aix-en-Provence, France. He was vice chairman of the board of directors of the United States Institute of Peace from 1992 to 2001. At the time of his death, he was co-chair of the American Committee for Peace in Chechnya and a member of the Committee on the Present Danger, a policy institute that favors larger defense budgets and arms build-ups.

In 1984, he received the Golden Plate Award of the American Academy of Achievement presented by Awards Council member Ambassador Sol Linowitz. On January 18, 1989, President Reagan awarded Kampelman the Presidential Citizens Medal. On August 11, 1999, President Clinton awarded him the Presidential Medal of Freedom. On May 22, 2008, at a ceremony held at the US State Department in Washington, D.C., Kampelman was presented by the National Endowment for Democracy with its Democracy Service Medal in recognition of his lifetime achievement in advancing the principles of freedom, human rights, and democracy.

In May and June 1990, Ambassador Kampelman returned to the negotiation table of the CSCE for the successful Copenhagen Declaration. He was personally commended by President George H. W. Bush for his delegation's "major role in that historic achievement".

Kampelman served as a motivating force behind the op-ed "A World Free of Nuclear Weapons", published on January 4, 2007, in The Wall Street Journal by George P. Shultz, Henry Kissinger, Sam Nunn and William Perry.

=== Legacy ===
Kampelman received thirteen honorary Doctorate degrees, as well as the Knight Commander's Cross of the Order of Merit of the Federal Republic of Germany.

- The Communist Party vs. The C.I.O: A Study in Power Politics (Praeger, 1957)
- Autobiography: Entering New Worlds: The Memoirs of a Private Man in Public Life (HarperCollins, 1991)

== See also ==
- List of U.S. political appointments that crossed party lines

== Additional resources ==
- The Papers of Max M. Kampelman are available for research use at the Minnesota Historical Society.
