= ACPC =

ACPC may refer to:

- Animal Crossing: Pocket Camp
- American Committee for Peace in Chechnya
- Always Connected PC, a type of Microsoft PCs which will always remain online
