= KPK =

KPK may refer to:

== Organizations ==
- Canadian Polish Congress, Kongres Polonii Kanadyjskiej (KPK)
- Komisi Pemberantasan Korupsi (Corruption Eradication Commission), Indonesia
- Komisija za preprečevanje korupcije (Commission for the Prevention of Corruption), Slovenia

== Places ==
- Keon Park railway station, Melbourne
- Khyber Pakhtunkhwa, a province of Pakistan
