= Margaret Maye =

Margaret Maye is a Polish-Canadian singer and performer in various musical genres. Her repertoire consists of early and modern music, opera, oratorio, operetta, music theatre, cabaret, and jazz. Maye studied singing, drama and dancing at the post-secondary Music Theatre School in Gdynia and the Music Academy in Wrocław, Poland. She lives in Toronto, Canada.

She was born in Poland. While in Gdynia, Poland, Maye sang at the local festivals, city occasions and corporate events and toured with the Baltic Artistic Agency. In Toronto since 1988, she took part in productions by the Polish Canadian Society of Music, Polish Music Theatre in Toronto, Polonia Theatre, Polish Music and Poetry Salon, Summer Opera Lyric Theatre, Toronto Operetta Theatre, Opera in Concert, and Opera Mississauga. She produced her own show "Images" at the Premiere Dance Theatre and "On the Wings of Love" at the CBC Glenn Gould Studio.

In December 2004 Margaret Maye received the Order of Merit (L’Ordre du " Merite Culturel" – "Zasluzona na polu szerzenia kultury") from the Ministry of Culture of the Republic of Poland.

On November 14, 2014 Margaret Maye received an award from the "National Ethnic Press and Media Council of Canada", as presented to her by "The Lieutenant Governor of Ontario" in recognition of the contributions that she has made to her Polish community and to Canadian Society as an artist, philanthropist and humanitarian.
