= St. Mary's Polish Church =

Church in Nova Scotia, Canada

- Roman Catholic Polish Parish of the Nativity of St. Mary
- St. Mary's Polish Church
- 46.1582°N 60.1844°W
- Location: 21 Wesley Street, Whitney Pier, Sydney, Nova Scotia B1N 2M5
- Country: Canada
- Languages: English; Polish
- Denomination: Roman Catholic
- Website: stmaryspolishchurch.ca

History
- Status: Parish Church
- Founded: 1913
- Events: Burned on Nov 29, 2014

Architecture
- Functional status: Active
- Architect: Gary Handley (2015)
- Style: Polish Gothic
- Years built: 1913-1918; 2015-2016
- Completed: 1918

Administration
- Diocese: Antigonish

Nova Scotia Heritage Property Act
- Type: Provincially Registered Property
- Designated: 1984
- Reference no.: 00PNS0029

St. Mary's Polish Church is a Roman Catholic church in Whitney Pier, a neighbourhood of Sydney, Nova Scotia. Founded in 1913 with the church built between 1913 and 1918 on land donated in trust by the Szelak family, the parish serves the Polish community in Cape Breton and is the only parish serving a Polish community in Canada east of Montreal. It is a parish in the Diocese of Antigonish. The church was designated a Nova Scotian heritage property in 1984.

The church was destroyed by fire in 2014 but re-opened in 2016 following rebuilding. It contains various sacred objects from other churches, including a high altar from the Polish Manitoban settlement of Wisla. The rebuilt church remains a provincially registered heritage property.
