= Polish Canadians =

Canadians with Polish ancestry

Polonia w Kanadzie (Polish) Canadiens polonais (French)
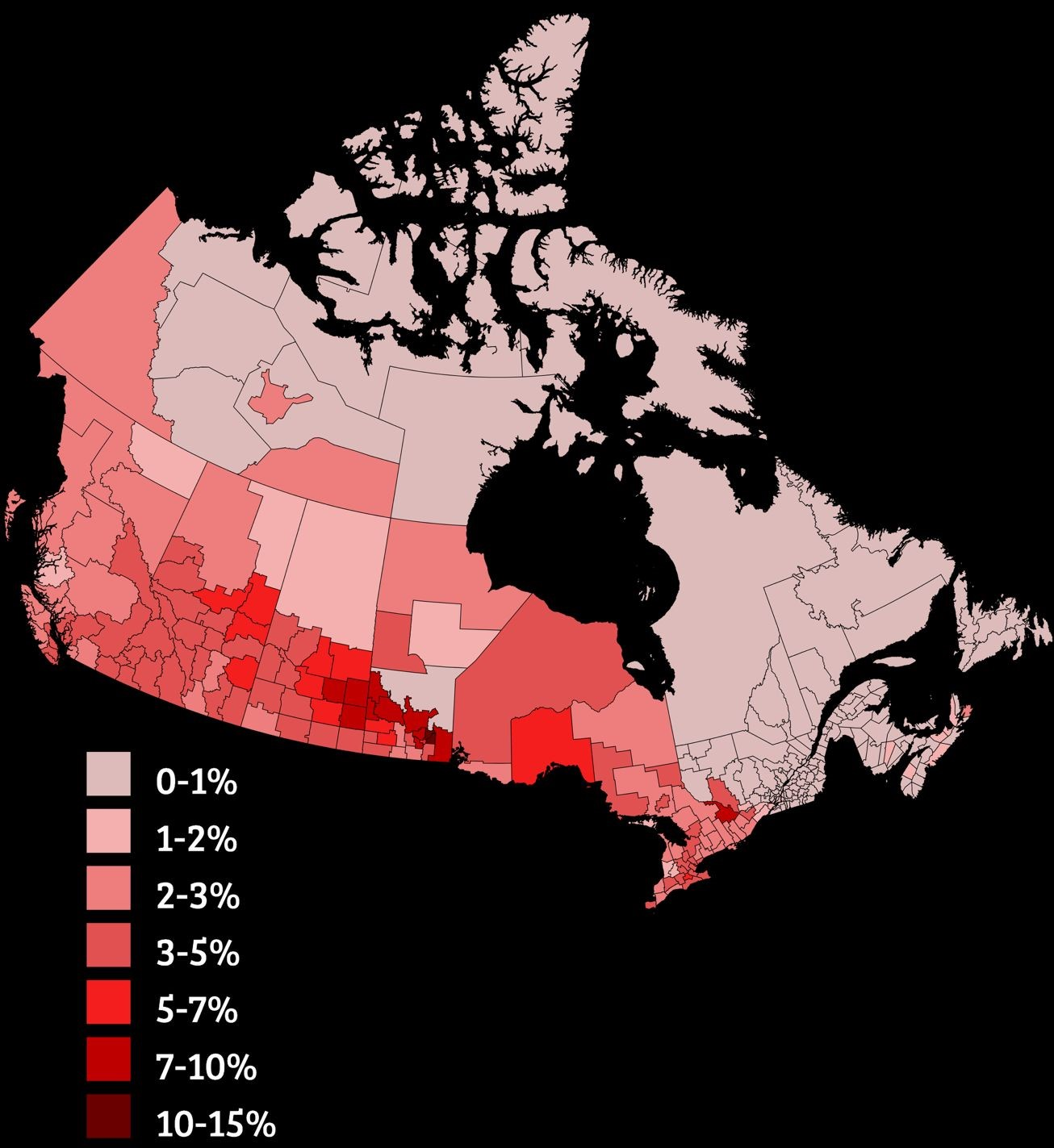
- Population distribution of Polish Canadians by census division, 2021 census

Total population
- 1,106,585 (by ancestry, 2016 Census)

Regions with significant populations
- Western Canada, Ontario

Languages
- Polish · Canadian English · Canadian French

Religion
- Predominantly Roman Catholicism · Judaism

Related ethnic groups
- Polish Jews · Polish Americans

Polish Canadians (Polish: Polonia w Kanadzie) are citizens of Canada with Polish ancestry, and Poles who immigrated to Canada from abroad. At the 2016 Census, there were 1,106,585 Canadians who claimed full or partial Polish heritage.

== History ==
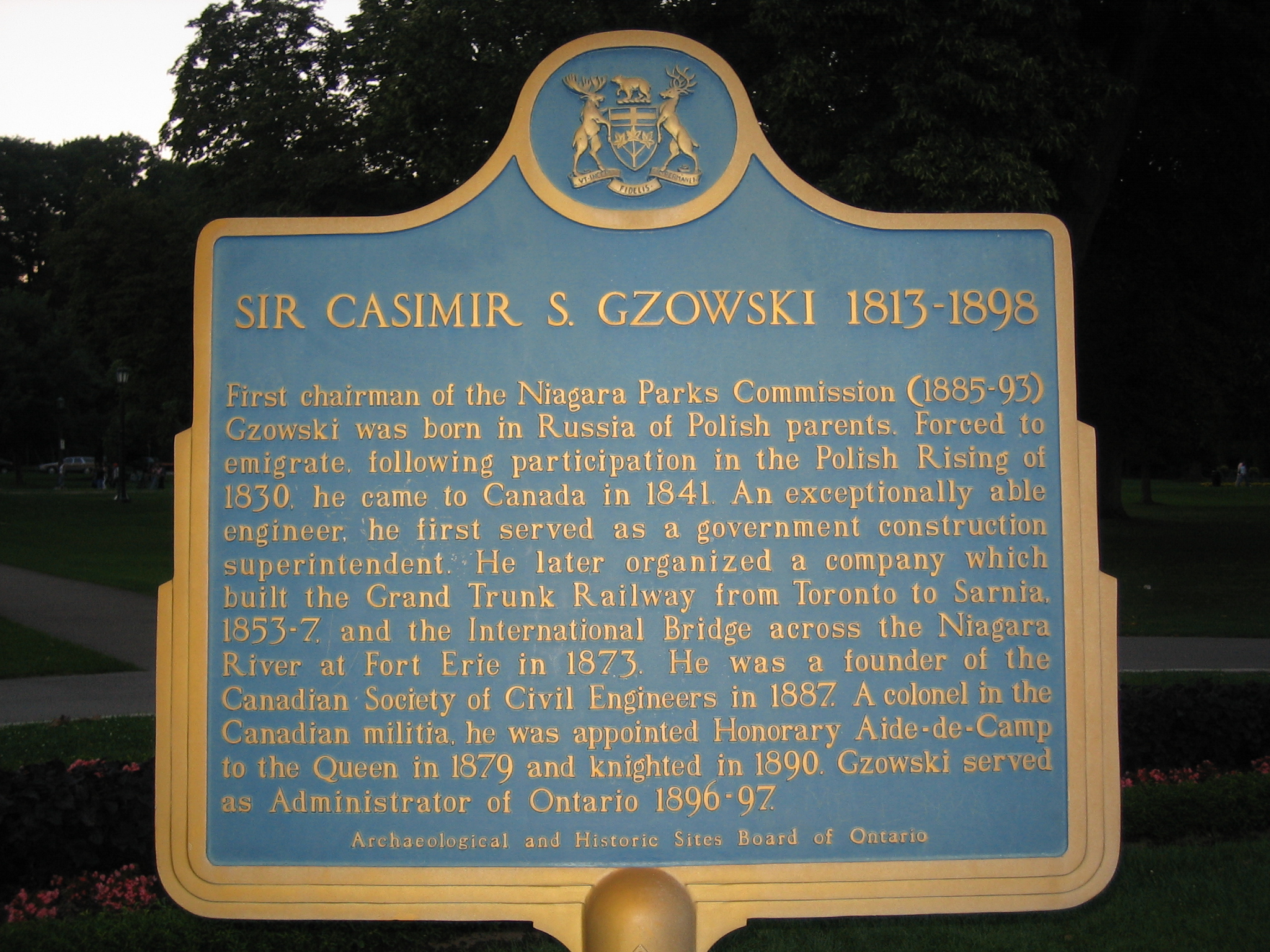
Sir Casimir S. Gzowski from Historic Sites of Ontario

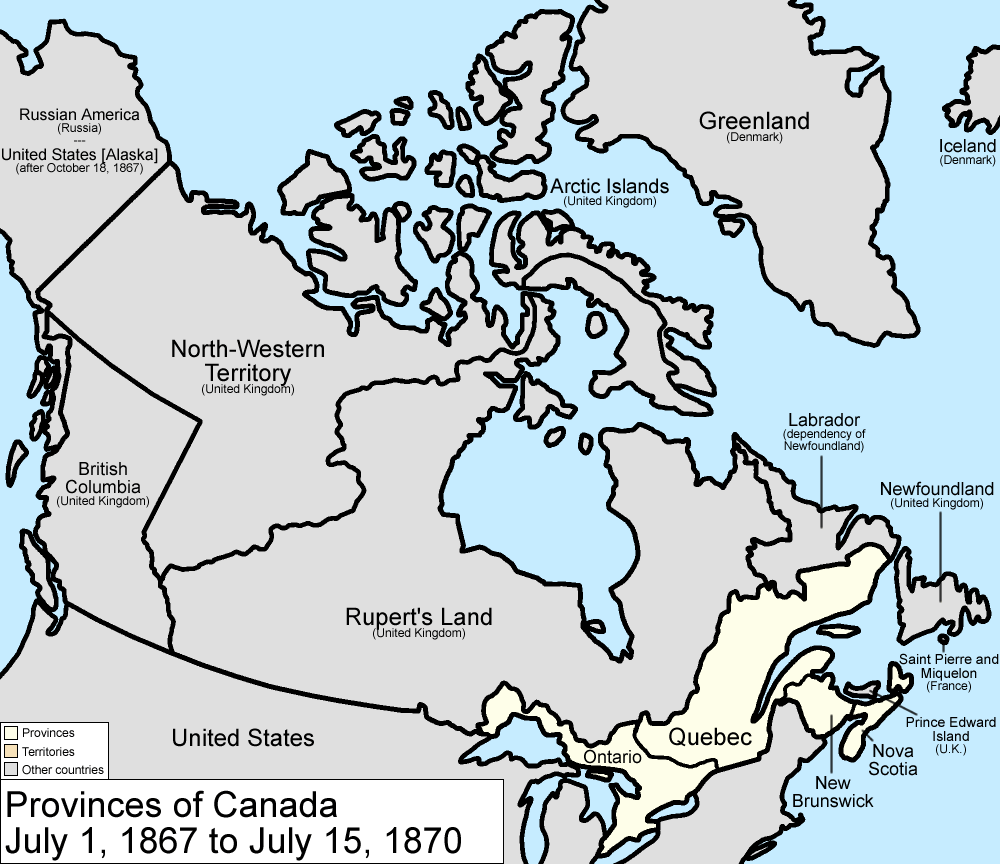
Canada provinces 1867–1870

The first Polish immigrant on record, was Dominik Barcz, came to Canada in 1752. He was a fur merchant from Gdańsk who settled in Montreal. He was followed in 1757 by Charles Blaskowicz, a deputy surveyor-general of lands. In 1776 arrived army surgeon, August Franz Globensky. His grandson, Charles Auguste Maximilien Globensky, was elected to the House of Commons in Ottawa in 1875.

Among the earliest Polish immigrants to Canada were members of the Watt and De Meuron military regiments from Saxony and Switzerland sent overseas to help the British Army in North America. Several were émigrés who took part in the November Uprising of 1830 and the 1863 insurrection against the Russian Empire in the Russian sector of partitioned Poland.

In 1841, Casimir Stanislaus Gzowski arrived in Canada from partitioned Poland via the US, and for 50 years worked in the engineering, military and community sectors in Toronto and Southern Ontario, for which he was knighted by Queen Victoria. His great-great-grandson, Peter Gzowski, became one of Canada's famous radio personalities.

Charles Horecki immigrated in 1872. He was an engineer with the cross-Canada railway construction from Edmonton to the Pacific Ocean through the Peace River Valley. Today, a mountain and a body of water in British Columbia are named after him.

Polish immigration stopped during World War I and between the wars, over 100,000 Polish immigrants arrived in Canada.

Polish Canadian Population History
Year	Pop.	±%
1901	6,285	—
1911	33,652	+435.4%
1921	53,403	+58.7%
1931	145,503	+172.5%
1941	167,485	+15.1%
1951	219,845	+31.3%
1961	323,517	+47.2%
1971	316,430	−2.2%
1981	254,485	−19.6%
1986	612,105	+140.5%
1991	740,710	+21.0%
1996	786,735	+6.2%
2001	817,085	+3.9%
2006	984,565	+20.5%
2011	1,010,705	+2.7%
2016	1,106,585	+9.5%
Source: Statistics Canada Note: 1981 Canadian census did not include multiple ethnic origin responses, thus population is an undercount.

== Group-settlers ==
The first significant group of Polish group-settlers were ethnic Kashubians from northern Poland, who were escaping Prussian and German oppression resulting from the occupation after the partitions. They arrived in Renfrew County of Ontario in 1858, where they founded the settlements of Wilno, Barry's Bay, and Round Lake. By 1890 there were about 270 Kashubian families working in the Madawaska Valley of Renfrew County, mostly in the lumber industry of the Ottawa Valley.

The consecutive waves of Polish immigrants in periods from 1890–1914, 1920–1939, and 1941 to this day, settled across Canada from Cape Breton to Vancouver, and made numerous and significant contributions to the agricultural, manufacturing, engineering, teaching, publishing, religious, mining, cultural, professional, sports, military, research, business, governmental and political life in Canada.

== Geographical distribution ==
Polish Canadians as % of population by area; also showing Polish Americans

Data from this section from Statistics Canada, 2021.

=== Provinces and territories ===
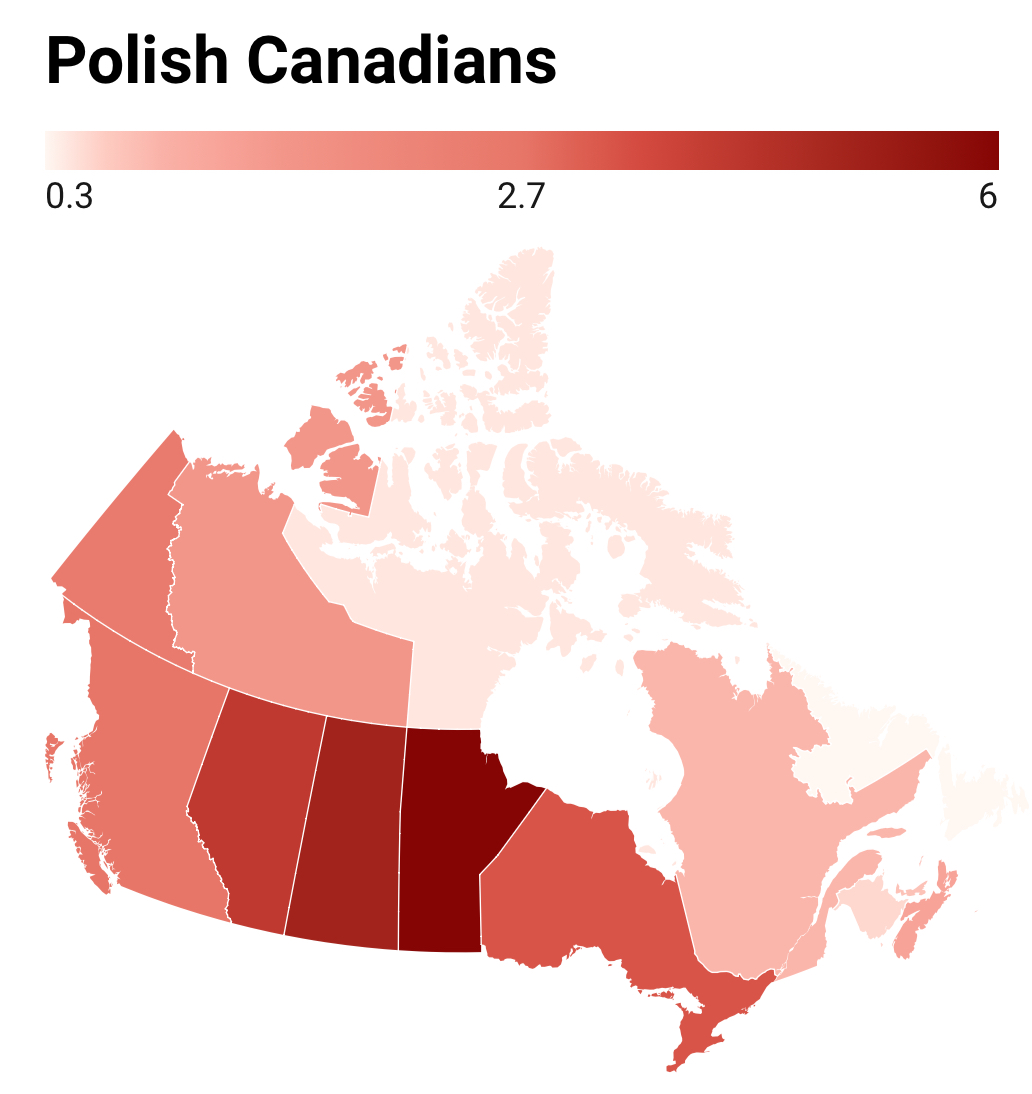
Polish percent in Canada by province/territory, 2021 census

Province / Territory	Percent Polish	Total Polish
Alberta	4.1%	169,925
British Columbia	2.7%	134,635
Manitoba	6.0%	78,860
New Brunswick	0.5%	3,815
Newfoundland and Labrador	0.3%	1,290
Northwest Territories	1.5%	615
Nova Scotia	1.2%	11,295
Nunavut	0.4%	135
Ontario	3.3%	461,090
Prince Edward Island	0.7%	1,055
Quebec	0.8%	63,505
Saskatchewan	5.0%	55,605
Yukon	2.5%	985
Canada — Total	2.7%	982,820

== Religion ==
All Polish Canadians including their descendants are encouraged by organizations such as the Congress, to preserve their background and retain some ties with Poland and its people. In the past, the most significant role in the preservation of various aspects of Polish traditions and customs among the Polish communities in Canada fell for the Polish urban parishes, which retain the use of the Polish language during services.

The first Polish Catholic priest visited Polish immigrants in 1862 in Kitchener. The first church serving Polish immigrants was built in 1875 in Wilno, Ontario. In Winnipeg, the Holy Ghost Church was built in 1899 with the church in Winnipeg publishing the first Polish newspaper in Canada, Gazeta Katolicka in 1908. In Sydney, Nova Scotia, St. Mary's Polish Parish was established in 1913 by immigrant steelworkers and coal miners, many of whom had previously formed the St. Michael's Polish Benefit Society (est. 1909). The parish remains the only Polish parish in Atlantic Canada, although there is a Polish mission (St. Faustina) in Halifax.

The first Polish-Canadian Roman Catholic bishop is Reverend Mathew Ustrzycki, consecrated in June 1985, auxiliary bishop of the Hamilton Diocese. There are Polish-Canadian priests in many congregations and orders, such as the Franciscans, Jesuits, Redemptorists, Saletinians, Resurrectionists, Oblates, Michaelites, and the Society of Christ. In addition, 80 priests serve in 120 parishes.

Polish Canadian demography by religion
Religious group	2021 (Note: Religious breakdown proportions based on "Polish" ethnic or cultural origin response on the 2021 census.)		2001 (Note: Religious breakdown proportions based on "Polish" ethnic or cultural origin response on the 2001 census.)	
Religious group	Pop.	%	Pop.	%
Christianity	562,525	57.24%	654,445	80.1%
Irreligion	356,055	36.23%	123,500	15.11%
Judaism	54,155	5.51%	35,430	4.34%
Buddhism	1,435	0.15%	945	0.12%
Islam	1,130	0.11%	495	0.06%
Indigenous spirituality	440	0.04%	—N/a	—N/a
Hinduism	305	0.03%	135	0.02%
Sikhism	140	0.01%	105	0.01%
Other	6,635	0.68%	2,020	0.25%
Total Polish Canadian population	982,815	100%	817,085	100%

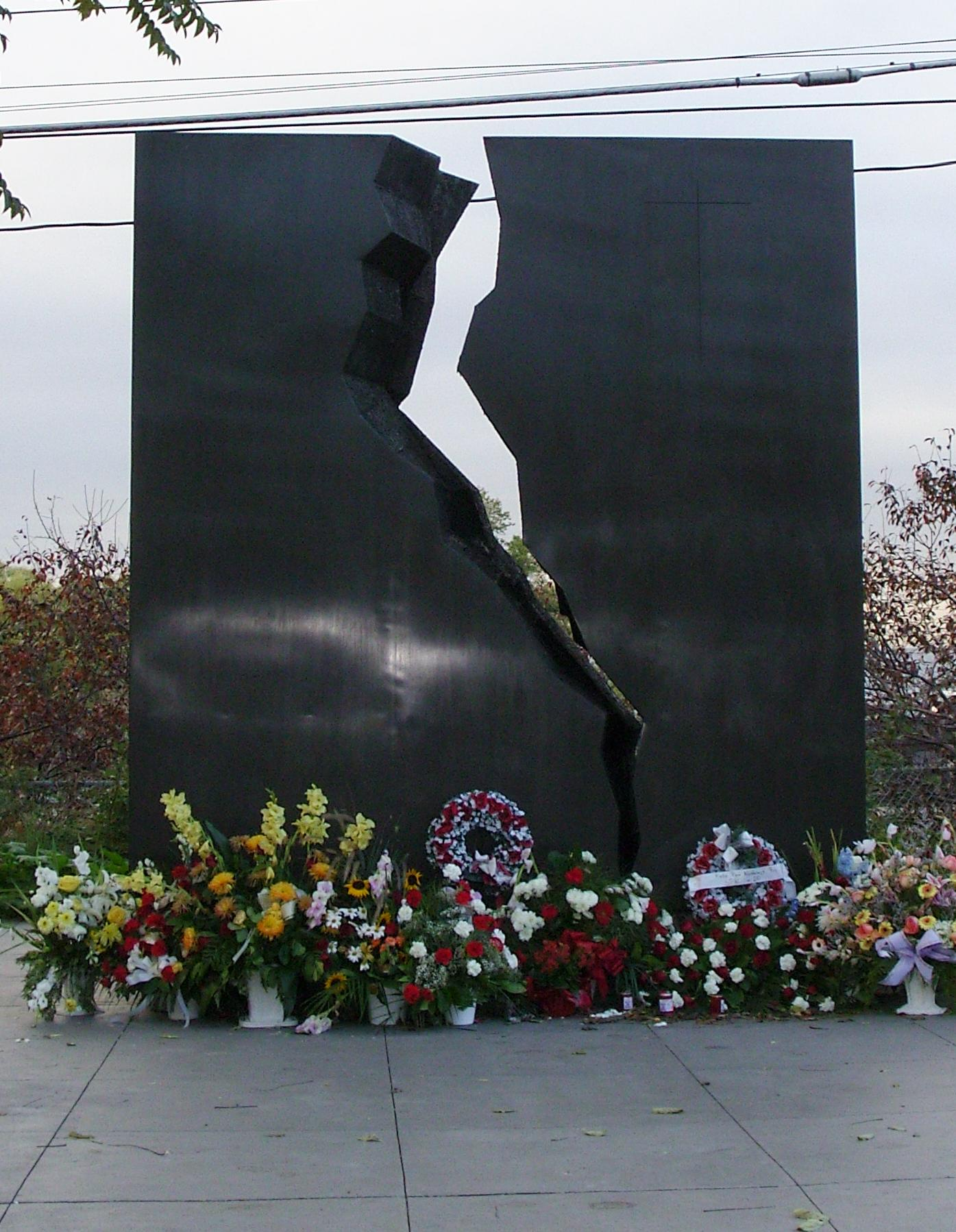
Toronto Memorial to Katyn

== Largest Polish Canadian communities ==
- Alberta
  - Calgary
  - Edmonton
- British Columbia
  - Surrey
  - Vancouver
  - Victoria
- Manitoba
  - Winnipeg
- Nova Scotia
  - Cape Breton
  - Dartmouth
  - Halifax
- Ontario
  - Hamilton
  - Kingston
  - London
  - Mississauga
  - Ottawa
  - Peterborough
  - Thunder Bay
  - Toronto
    - Roncesvalles
  - Wilno
- Quebec
  - Montreal
  - Rouyn-Noranda

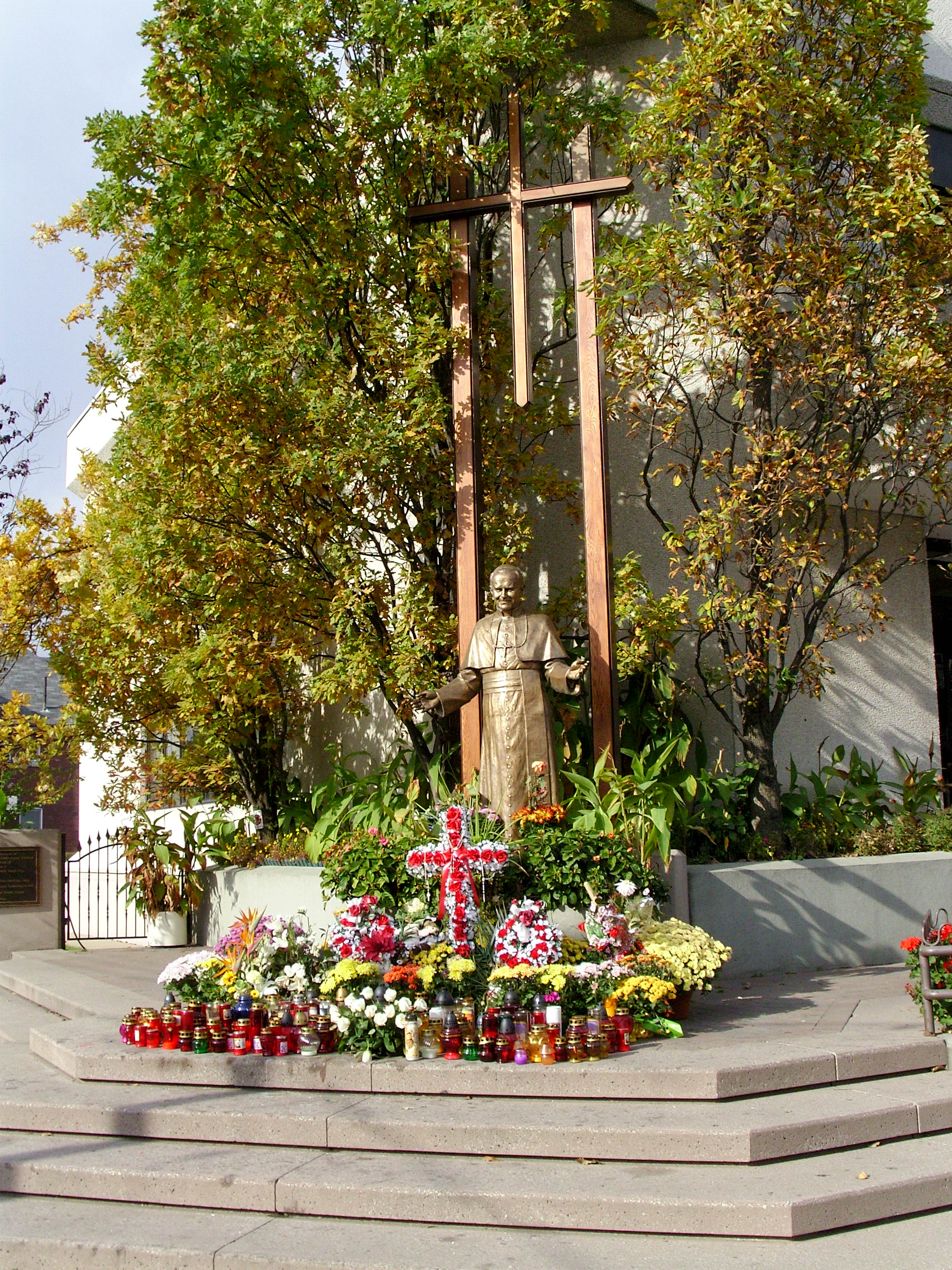
The Pope John Paul II statue, Toronto

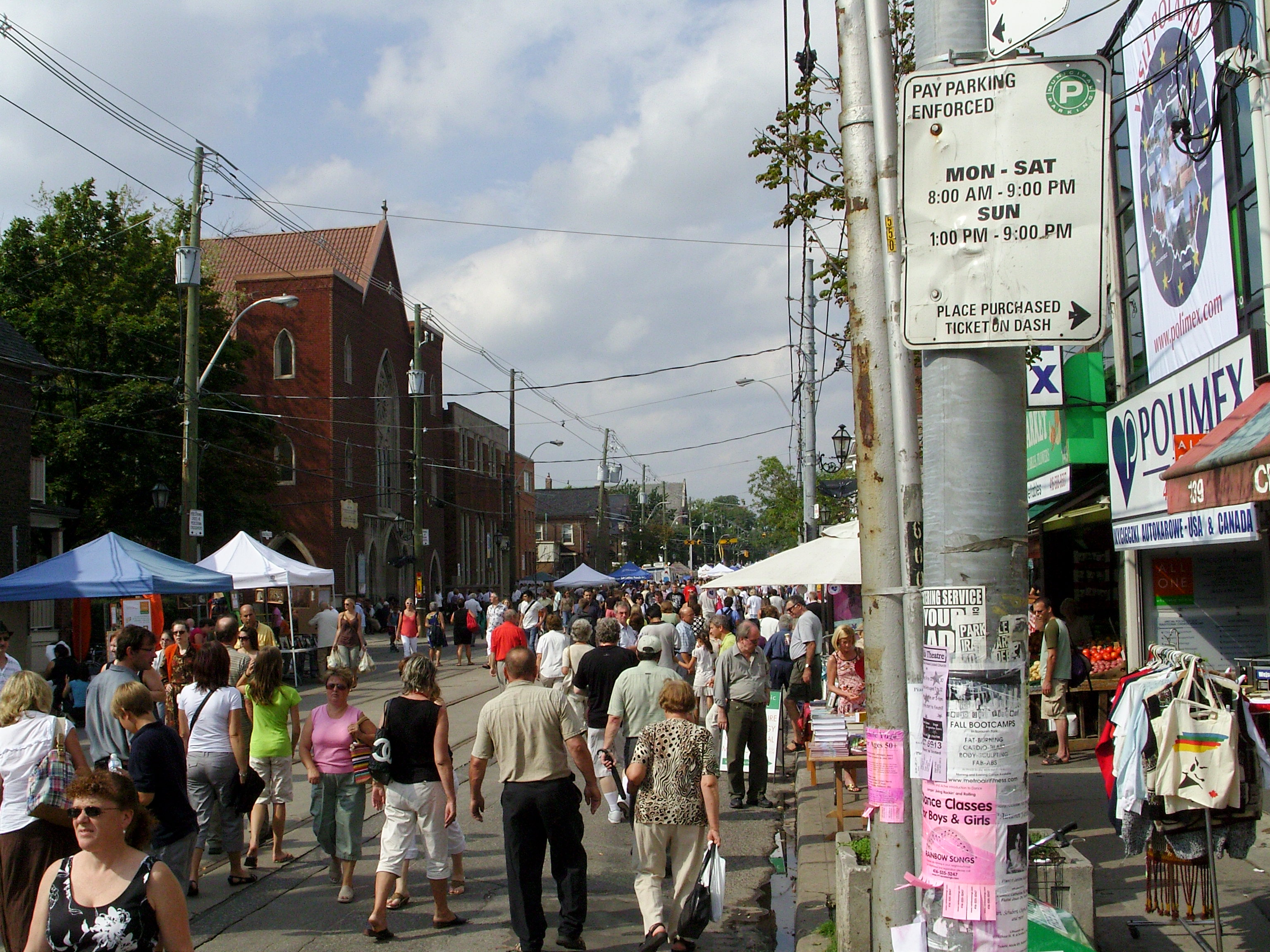
The largest Polish festival in Canada, held annually in Roncesvalles, Toronto

== Polish Canadian organizations ==
- Polonia Inclusive
- Canadian Polish Congress
- Polish Culture Society of Edmonton
- Polish National Union of Canada
- Konekt
- Polycultural Immigrant and Community Services
- Canadian Polish Research Institute
- Poland in the Rockies
- The Polish Institute of Arts and Sciences in Canada
- Canadian Federation of Polish Women
- Federation of Polish Jews of Canada

== Recognition ==
=== The Victoria Cross ===
Numerous Polish-Canadians have been recognized with awards and appointments by the Queen and the Canadian governments as well as universities and various organizations. One of the most notable recipients was Andrew Mynarski, pilot-gunner from Winnipeg, awarded the Victoria Cross posthumously for extreme valor in World War II.

=== The Order of Canada ===
- Mary Adamowska Panaro, C.M. Winnipeg, Welfare Council of Winnipeg
- Alice Parizeau, journalist. Officer 1987
- Dr. Henry Wojcicki – Edmonton, distinguished psychiatrist, University of Alberta senator. Member 1989
- Geddy Lee, musician of rock band Rush. Officer 1996

- Dr. Tom Brzustowski, President of NSERC. Officer 2002
- Walter Gretzky, philanthropist. Member 2007
- The Honourable Allan H. Wachowich, C.M., A.O.E., Q.C. Edmonton, Alberta. Member November 18, 2019.

=== Judges ===
Their Honours
- Judge Paul Staniszewski – of Toronto, Montreal and the County Court of Windsor
- Judge Alfred Harold Joseph Swencisky – of the Superior Court of BC in Vancouver; past president of the Vancouver Hospital Association
- Judge P. Swiecicki – of the Superior Court of BC in Vancouver
- Judge Allan H. J. Wachowich – of the Court of Queen's Bench in Edmonton
- Chief Judge Edward R. Wachowich - of the Provincial Court of Alberta (deceased 2012)
- Judge E.F. Wrzeszczinski-Wren – of the County Court of Toronto (deceased)

== See also ==
- Canada–Poland relations
- Great Emigration
- Canadian-Polish Congress
- Polish Culture Society of Edmonton
- Polish Americans
- Polish Cathedral style, North America
- Polish British
- Polish Australians
- Polish Brazilians
- Kashubians § Diaspora
