= Canada–Poland relations =

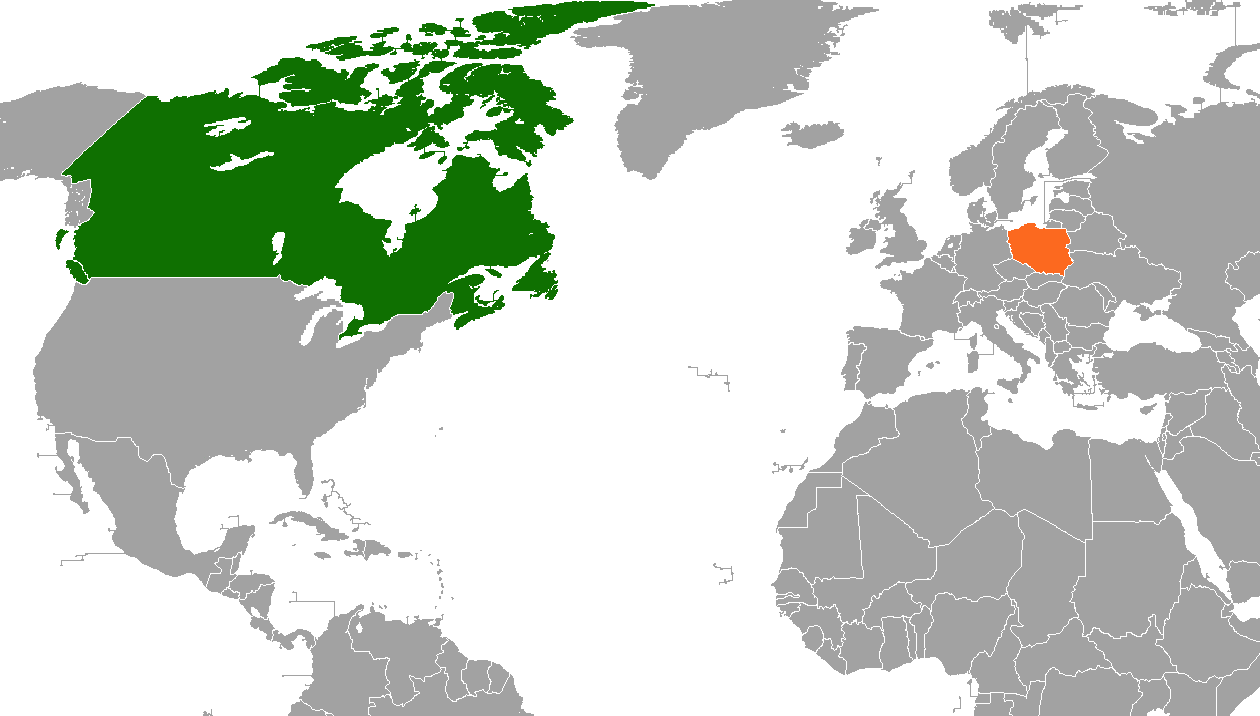

- Canada: Poland

Canada and Poland first established diplomatic relations in 1919. Both countries are full members of the Organisation for Economic Co-operation and Development, NATO, the Organization for Security and Co-operation in Europe and the World Trade Organization.

== History ==
=== Early history ===
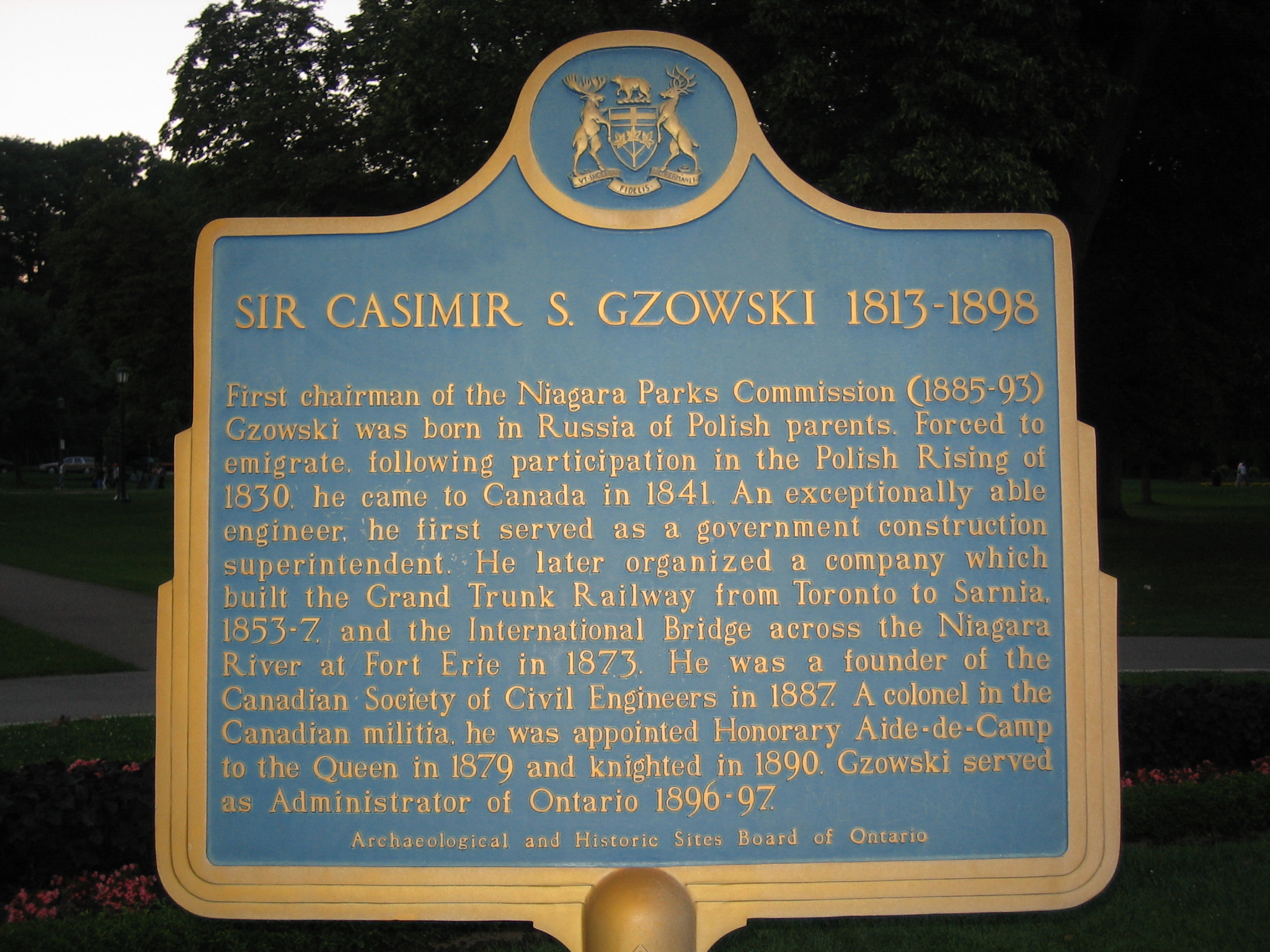
Memorial plaque to Casimir Gzowski in Niagara Falls, Ontario

The first Polish migrants to Canada arrived soon after the First Partition of Poland in the late 1700s. From the 1800s to the end of communism in Poland; Canada received large waves of migration from Poland. The first Pole known to arrive in Canada was the fur trader Dominik Barcz, who arrived in Montreal from Gdańsk in 1752. The railroad engineer Sir Casimir Gzowski played a prominent role in 19th century Canada by building several railroads, most notably the first railroad that linked Ontario to Quebec, for which he was knighted by Queen Victoria.

In 1858, the first large settlement of Poles in Canada was the founding of the settlement of Wilno in is now eastern Ontario by a group of farmers from Kashubia, then located in the Prussian Partition of Poland. In 1862, another group of Poles settled in Berlin, Canada West (modern Kitchener, Ontario). In the early 20th century, a significant number of Polish farmers from the Austrian Partition of Poland (Galicia) settled in the Prairie provinces of Alberta, Saskatchewan, and Manitoba. The overwhelming majority of Polish immigrants to Canada in their letters to friends and families described Canada in very positive terms to such an extent that the term "Canada" entered the Polish language as a slang term for any place of boundless prosperity and plenty. Galicia was one of the most poorest and backward regions of Europe that was disparagingly called halbasien ("half-Asia") by Austrian officials because its people lived at an "Asiatic" level of poverty. The living conditions in Galicia were made worse by overpopulation and the Panic of 1893, which threw world's economy into a depression, only aggravated matters. The stories about free fertile land on the Prairies of Canada encouraged Galician peasants to dream of Canada as a place to escape to. However, the Polish szlachta (nobility) and ziemianie (gentry) who controlled political and economic power in Galicia saw mass emigration to Canada as such a threat to their economic power that their representatives in the Austrian Reichsrat in 1895 proposed a law that would ban any publication that promoted emigration.

A Canadian novel that made major impact in Poland was Anne of Green Gables. In 1912, Anne of Green Gables was first translated into Polish and published in a pirate edition in Warsaw with the book being credited to "Anne Montgomery" (the author was Lucy Maud Montgomery). The book was an immediate success in Poland and went through several editions. In 1932, Anne of Green Gables was voted in a poll the fourth most popular book in Poland.

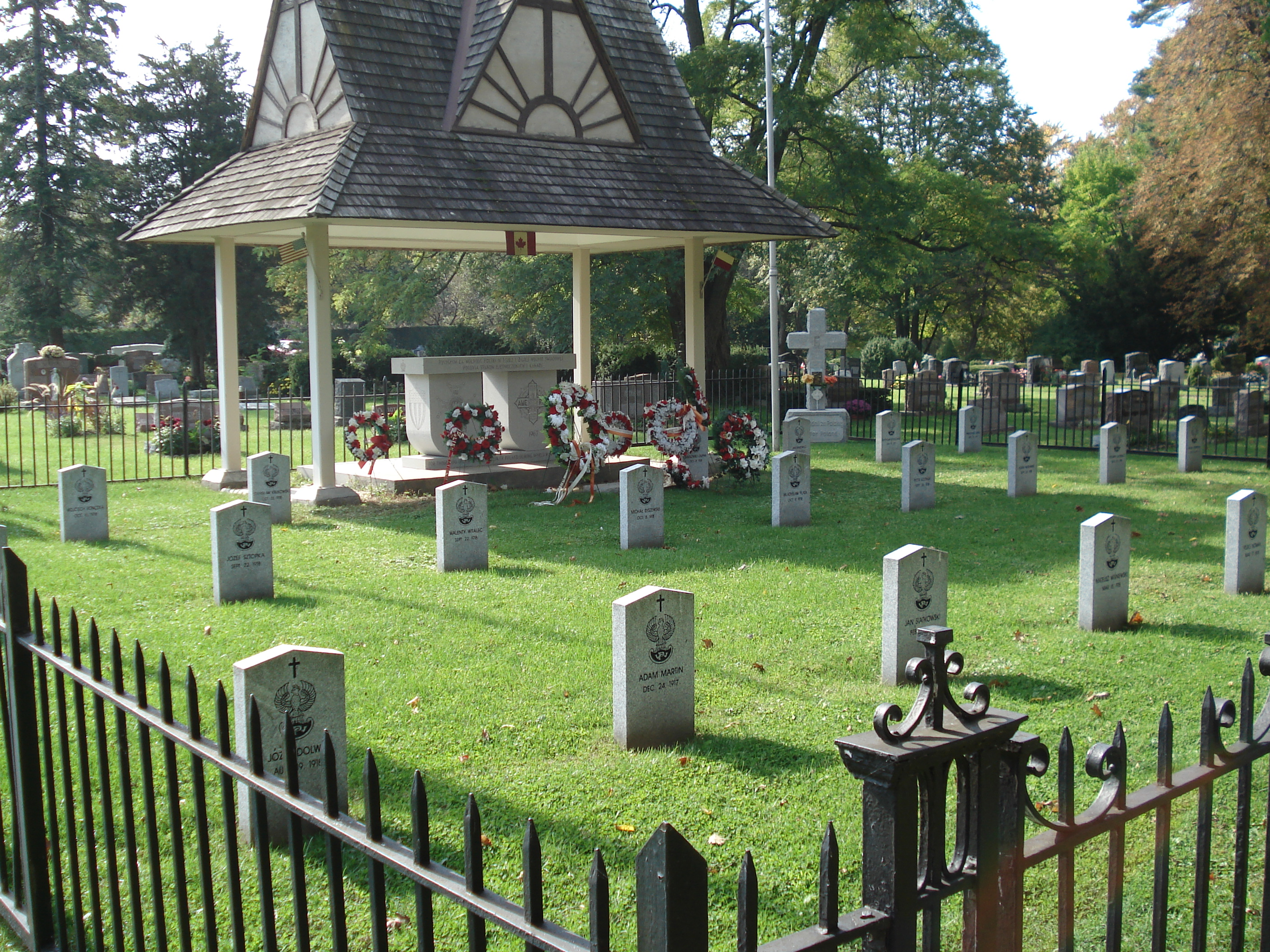
Polish Soldier's Burial Plot from 1917–1919 in Niagara-on-the-Lake

Following World War I, in 1918, Poland regained independence. Diplomatic relations between Canada and Poland were first established in June 1919 and carried out by the Polish embassy in London. In the interwar period, Polish immigrants continued to settle mainly on the Prairies and Winnipeg was the largest Polish city in Canada. Some of the second wave immigrants were better educated than the first wave and many opened small businesses. Because agriculture was a declining business in the 1920s and even more so in the 1930s, many Polish immigrants after living their first years in western Canada tended to move to northern Ontario to work as miners or to southern Ontario to work in the factories. As before the First World War, Polish immigrants to Canada came disproportionately from the area that had been Galicia under the Austrian empire with very few Poles coming from the areas that had belonged to either the German or Russian empires before 1914.

Under the Second Republic, it was official policy to encourage immigration to Canada from Galicia largely as a way to lower the number of ethnic Ukrainians in Galicia, a region where relations between Poles and Ukrainians were difficult at best. After the United States passed the Immigration Control Act of 1924, which drastically limited the number of immigrants allowed to enter the United States from eastern Europe, Canada became the principal destination for Polish immigrants until 1939. In 1919, immigrants from Poland were classified as "non-preferred", but by 1925 Canada reverted to the pre-1914 "open door" policy. In 1926, Roman Kutyłowski, the deputy director of the Polish State Emigration Council, suggested that a massive emigration of Polish peasants to western Canada was the solution to the problem of rural poverty in Poland, which in turn led him to suggest increased funding for the Polish consulate in Winnipeg. The Winnipeg consulate was directed to write more material promoting Canada as a paradise while at the same time Roman Catholic priests were encouraged to move to Canada out of the hope that their congregations would follow them. Knowing that many Canadian WASPs (White Anglo-Saxon Protestants) intensely disliked Catholic immigrants, Kutyłowski advised that the policy of encouraging immigration to Canada be done "tactfully". In 1929, the Polish government sent Count Aleksander de Largo of the Polish Colonization Society to explore the best places for Poles to settle in western Canada. Laro recommended the Prince Albert area in Saskatchewan and the Athabaska area of Alberta, but the Great Depression led to Canada tightening the immigration rules in 1930, which ended Largo's immigration scheme.

Generally speaking, Polish immigrants to Canada in the interwar period boarded ships in the Free City of Danzig (Gdańsk) or Gdynia that took them to Halifax, Quebec City or Montreal. Upon landing, the immigrants were taken via train to western Canada, their preferred destination. A major dispute between Canada and Poland was over which shipping line was to take the immigrants to Canada; the Polish government wanted to immigrants to use ships belonging to the state-owned Gdynia-America Line while the Canadian government preferred immigrants to use ships owned by either the Canadian Pacific Railway or the Canadian National Railway.

=== World War II ===
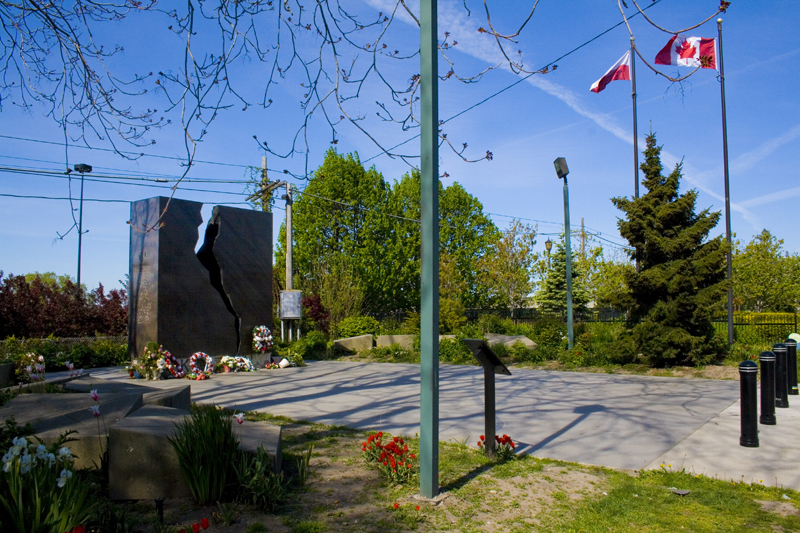
Katyn Monument in Toronto

During the Danzig crisis in the summer of 1939, the Canadian Prime Minister William Lyon Mackenzie King hoped the crisis would be resolved with Poland agreeing to the German demand that the Free City of Danzig "go home to the Reich". In April 1943, when mass graves of the Polish officers massacred by the NKVD in the Katyn Wood were discovered, Mackenzie King wrote in his diary that it was the Poles who caused the outbreak of the war in 1939 by refusing to give in to Hitler's demand that Danzig be allowed to rejoin Germany, and as such it was the Poles' own fault for the Katyn massacre and everything else they had suffered since 1939. The British historian Victor Rothwell described King's comments about the Katyn Wood massacre as "spiteful". On 1 September 1939 Germany invaded Poland starting World War II, and on 3 September 1939 Polish-allied Britain and France declared war on Germany. Canada joined the Allies and entered World War II by declaring war on Germany on 10 September 1939. King was unenthusiastic about going to war, but in English Canada there was such a popular demand that Canada stand by the "mother country" of Great Britain that he had no choice. King felt no affection for Poland, and after declaring war wrote in his diary that if Hitler did not win the war, then Stalin certainly would.

In Poland, the image of Canada was always that of a boundless land of plenty and wealth. Reflecting this image, at the Auschwitz concentration camp, the warehouses storing the items belonging to the inmates that were confiscated were known as the Kanada warehouses. The book Anne of Green Gables remained very popular in Poland and during the war, the Armia Krajowa resistance group handed out copies of Anne of Green Gables to its members as a symbol of what they were fighting for.

Memorial to the victims of the German-perpetrated Stalag Luft III murders, including Canadians and Poles, in Żagań, Poland

Canadian prisoners of war were held alike Polish prisoners of war in several German prisoner-of-war camps in modern Poland, including Stalag II-D, Stalag VIII-A, Stalag VIII-C, Stalag XX-B, Stalag Luft III, Stalag Luft IV, Stalag Luft 7, Oflag XXI-B. Several Poles and Canadians were among the victims of the Stalag Luft III murders, perpetrated by Germany in 1944, and there is a memorial in Żagań, Poland.

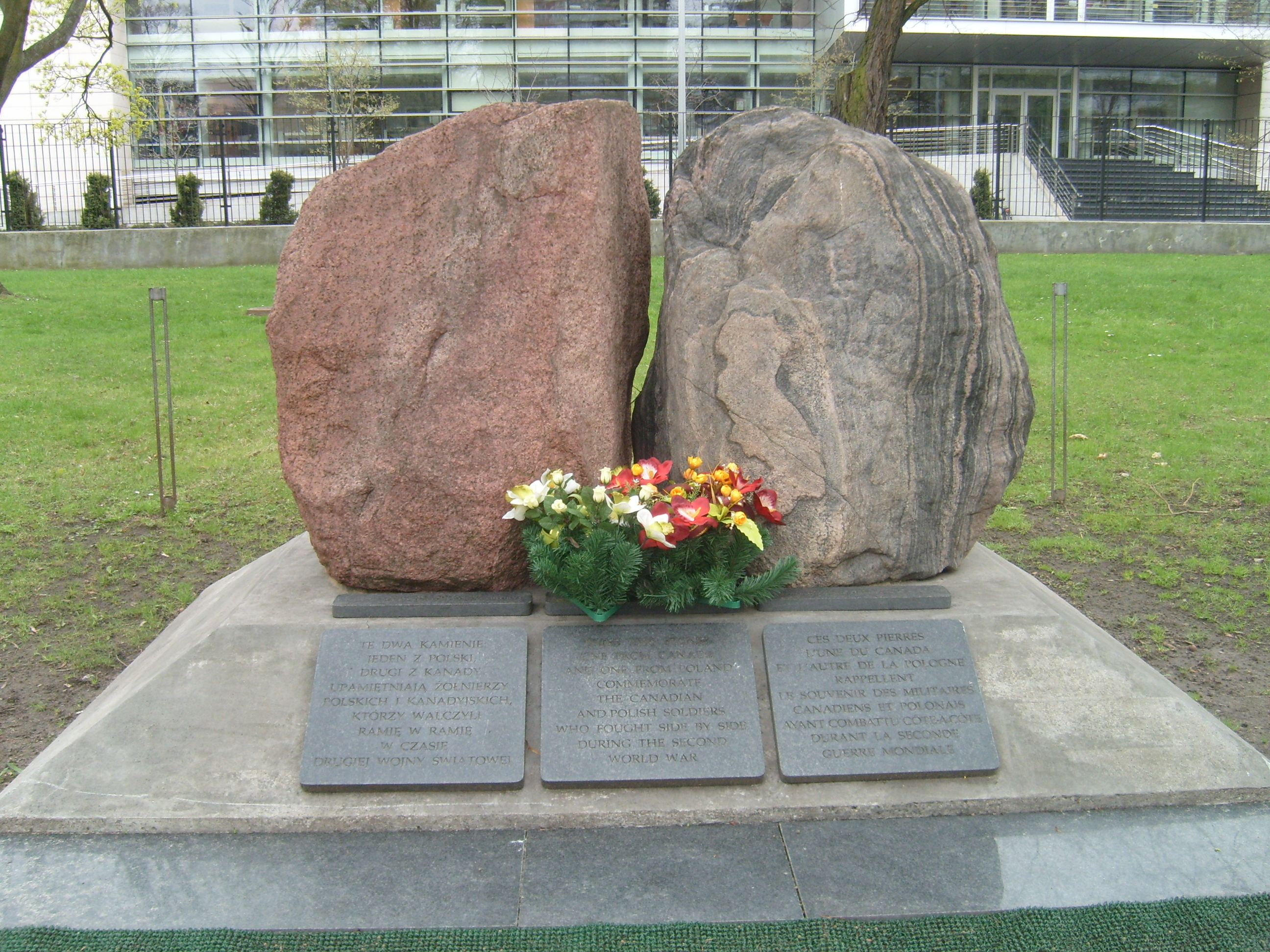
The Two Rocks monument at the Canadian embassy in Warsaw, Poland, commemorating the Canadian and Polish soldiers who fought side by side during the Second World War

In March 1942, the Polish government-in-exile opened a legation mission in Ottawa. Relations with the Polish government-in-exile in London were handled by the Canadian high commission in London. During the war, Canadian and Polish troops fought alongside during the Dieppe Raid in France in August 1942. The 1st Canadian Corps and the 2nd Polish Corps both fought together as part of the British 8th Army in the Italian Campaign from February 1944 when the 2nd Polish Corps went into action until February 1945 when the 1st Canadian Corps was transferred to the Low Countries. Starting in July 1944, the 1st Armoured Polish Division under General Stanisław Maczek served in the 2nd Canadian Corps under the command of General Guy Simonds. The 1st Armoured Division fought as part of the 2nd Canadian Corps in the Normandy campaign, the advance into the Low Countries, the Battle of the Scheldt, and in the liberation of the Netherlands. At sea, the Polish destroyer ORP Błyskawica (which the Canadians called the "bottle of whiskey" owing to an inability to pronounce Błyskawica correctly) served alongside the Canadian destroyer HMCS Haida in the 10th Destroyer Flotilla that battled German destroyers for the control of the English channel. In 2007, the Błyskawica and the Haida were "twinned" owing to their service together. Soon after the end of the war, both nations re-established diplomatic relations and their respective legation missions were elevated to embassies in April 1960.

Despite Polish war effort, Poland fell to the Soviet Union, which installed a communist regime. After 1945, another wave of Polish immigrants arrived in Canada, mostly consisting of Second World War veterans, survivors of the concentration camps and refugees from Communism. The third wave tended to settle in Ontario and were better educated than the previous waves with many coming to enjoy middle class lifestyles.

=== Post-war period ===
After the Second World War, the character of Anne Shirley became even more popular in Poland. At a writers' conference in 1946, Maria Kann, a popular writer of books for young people spoke in favor of Montgomery's books under the grounds that young people needed a literature "that would bring back life and joy to youngsters after those horrible years which devoured so many young lives, and had taken away youth and joy from those who survived." The publisher Michael Arct was allowed to publish the first three of Montgomery's Anne books, all which were immediate bestsellers. In a 1948 article in the journal Tydzieri by the poet Jerzy Wyszomirski sought to explain why the Anne books were so popular in Poland. Wyszomirski argued with Poland in ruins, people needed a character like Anne who remained optimistic and cheerful. Wyszomirski further argued that since the last uprising against Russian rule in 1863–1864, there were two opposing ideals present in the Poles-the positivistic emphasizing practicality and realism that called for making the best of the world as it is with a focus on economic development vs. the romantic with an emphasis on romantic heroism, dreamy visions of a better world, and an unwillingness to compromise no matter how desperate the situation. Of the two most important Polish leaders of the early 20th century, Roman Dmowski personified the positivistic ideal while his great rival Józef Piłsudski personified the romantic ideal. Wyszomirski argued that Poles loved the Anne books because most of the people living on Prince Edward Island in the books represent the positivistic ideal while Anne represents the romantic ideal who arrives to challenge the prevailing positivistic orthodoxy. Wyszomirski that Montgomery achieved a synthesis of "practical romanticism" in her books, which represented the attitude most needed in modern Poland, hence the popularity of her books in Poland.

In 1954, the Geneva Accords partitioned Vietnam into North Vietnam and South Vietnam. To monitor the Geneva Accords, the International Control Commission was created consisting of delegations from India, Poland and Canada. The chairman of the ICC was always an Indian with the Polish and Canadian commissioners reporting to him. One of the Polish Commissioners to the ICC, Mieczysław Maneli later wrote: "In this period of my work with my Indian and Canadian colleagues, I was struck by their loyal cooperation. It was a period when most of the cases were against the Southern authorities; whenever there was justifiable suspicion that the Southern authorities were treating their citizens in an inhumane manner, the Canadian delegates never hesitated in condemning the crimes. I always considered this to be extremely significant."

During the 1980s, Canada took an interest in the Polish trade union known as "Solidarność" (Solidarity) led by Lech Wałęsa. Many of the union members were arrested soon after martial law came into effect from December 1981 – July 1983. After their prison sentence, many high-ranking members of the union were offered asylum by Canada. In addition, Canada agreed to receive 6,000 Polish refugees fleeing the worsening of conditions in Poland during the increased economic and political oppression of dissidents by the government. After the Polish Round Table Agreement in April 1989, Lech Wałęsa paid a visit to Canada in November 1989 paving the way for an official visit by Polish Prime Minister Tadeusz Mazowiecki in 1990, the first Polish head of government to visit Canada. Since the historic visit, there have been several high-level visits by leaders of both nations.

Later in 1990, Mazowiecki was eliminated in the first round of the presidential election by Stanisław Tymiński, a Polish-Canadian businessman claiming to be very wealthy who returned home to run for president. In the second round of the election, Tymiński was defeated by Wałęsa.

== High-level visits ==
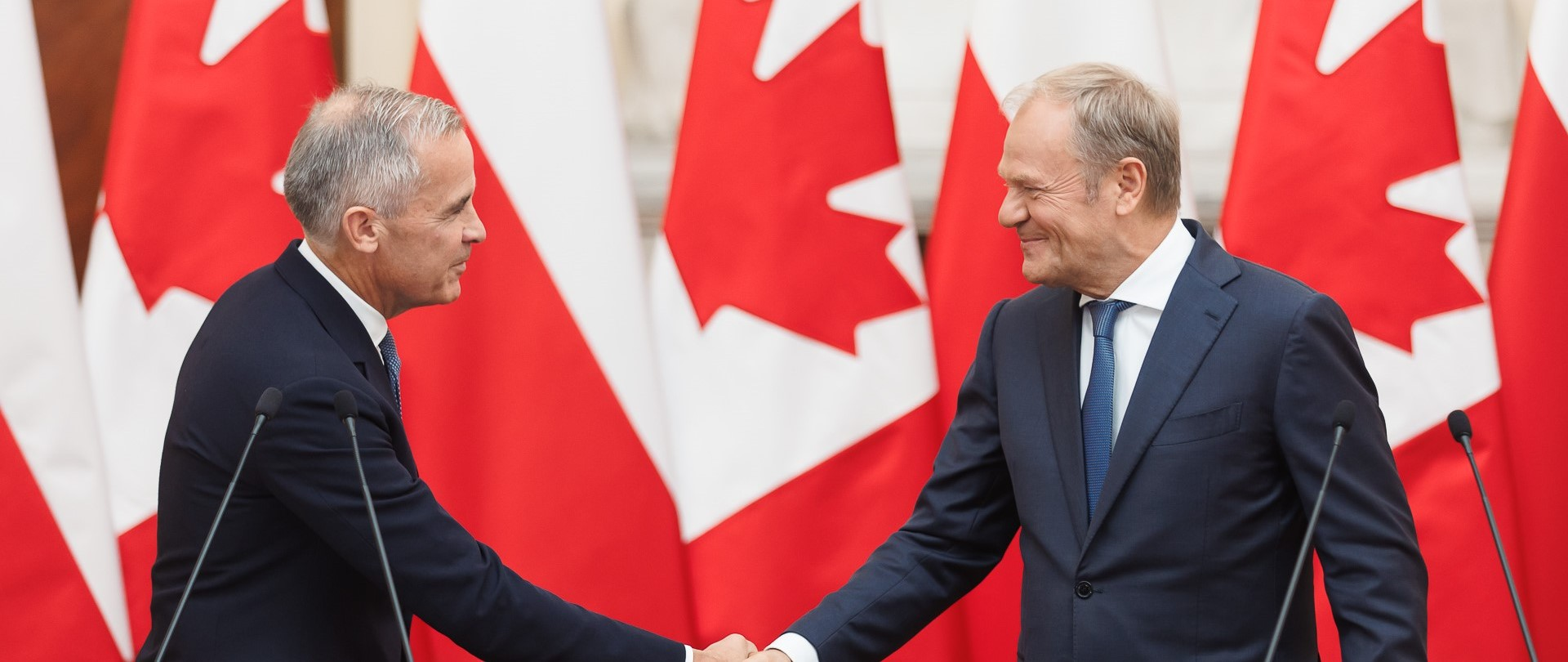
Canadian Prime Minister Mark Carney and Polish Prime Minister Donald Tusk in Warsaw; August 2025.

Prime Ministerial visits from Canada to Poland

- Prime Minister Jean Chrétien (1999)
- Prime Minister Stephen Harper (2014, 2015)
- Governor General David Johnston (2014)
- Prime Minister Justin Trudeau (2016, 2022, 2024, 2025)
- Prime Minister Mark Carney (2025)

Prime Ministerial and Presidential visits from Poland to Canada

- Prime Minister Tadeusz Mazowiecki (1990)
- President Lech Wałęsa (1994)
- Prime Minister Donald Tusk (2012, 2018)
- President Andrzej Duda (2016, 2024)
- Prime Minister Mateusz Morawiecki (2023)

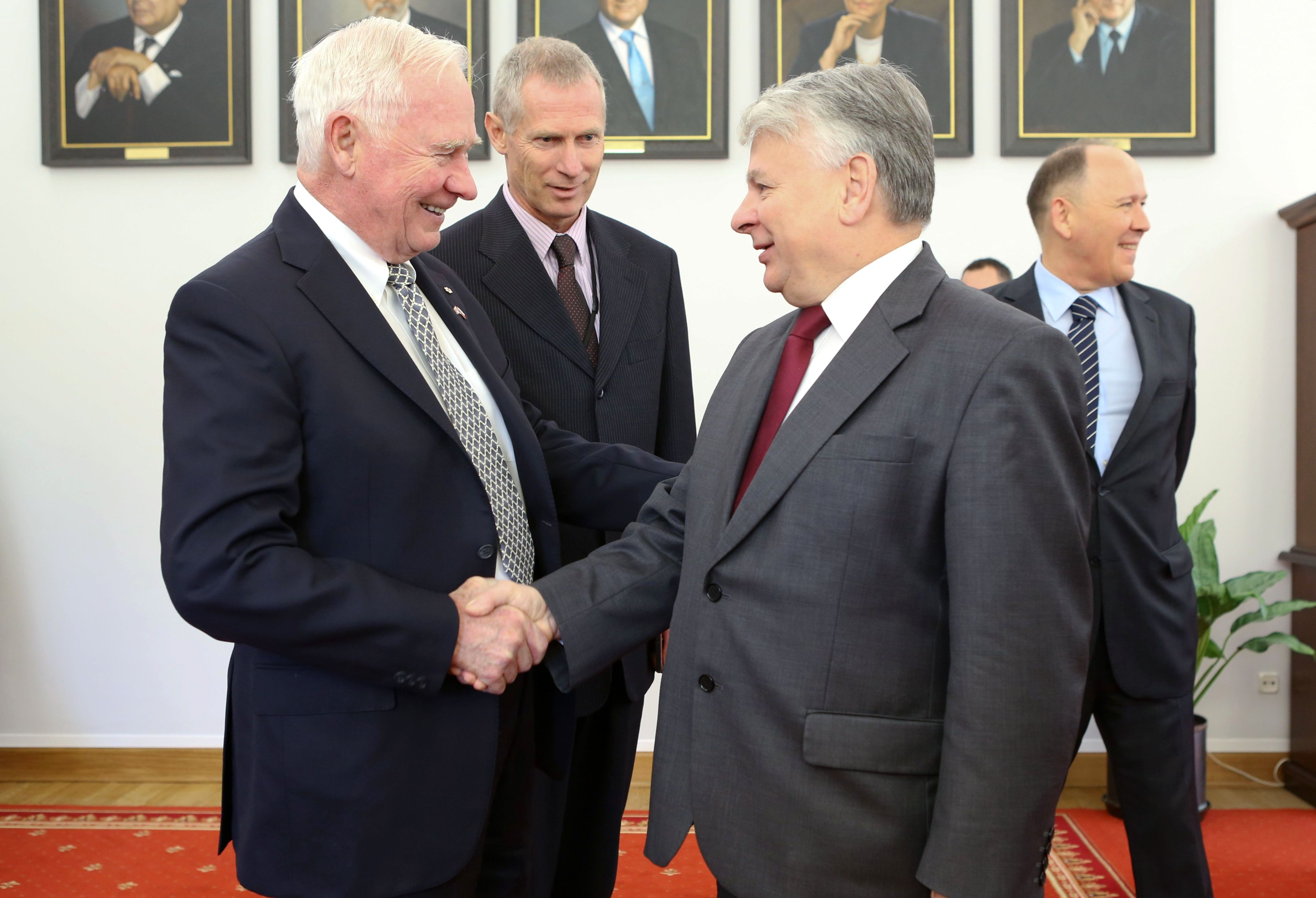
Canadian Governor General David Johnston and Polish Marshal of the Senate Bogdan Borusewicz in Warsaw; October 2014.

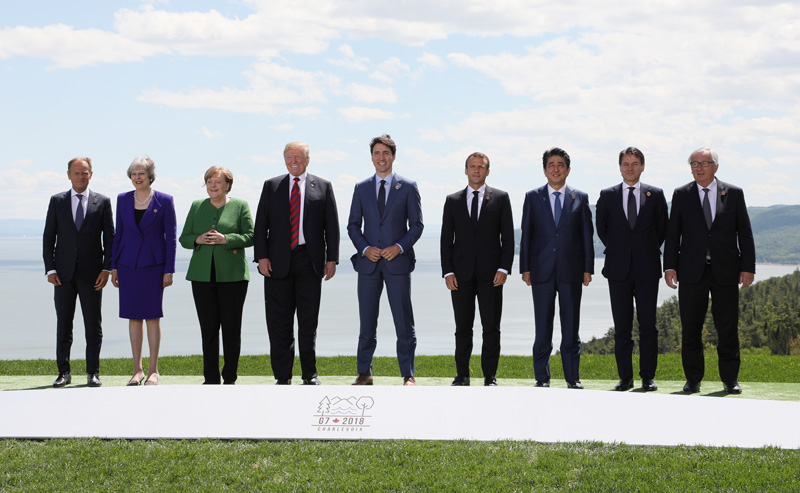
Prime Ministers Justin Trudeau and Donald Tusk attending the 44th G7 summit in La Malbaie, Canada; June 2018.

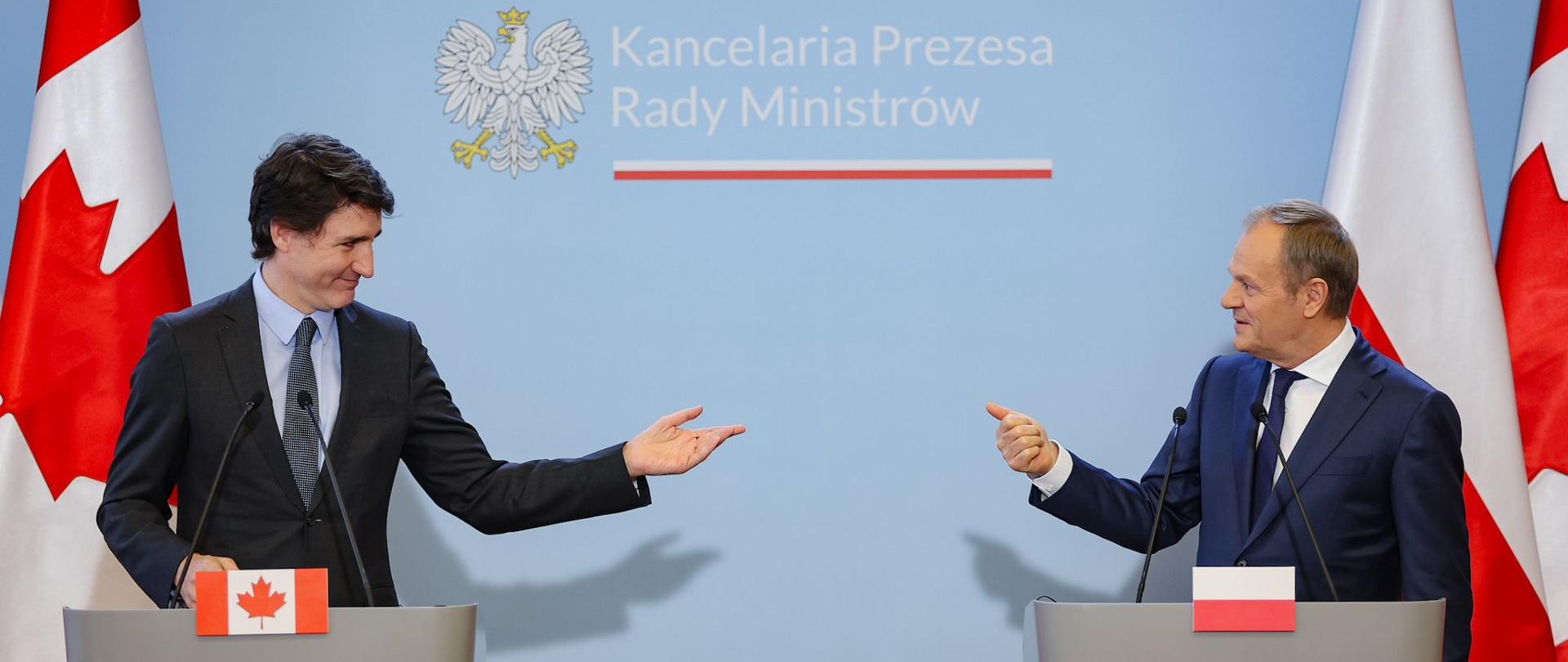
Prime Ministers Justin Trudeau and Donald Tusk in Warsaw, 2024.

== Defence ==
In February 1998, Canada was the first NATO country to ratify Polish accession to the North Atlantic Alliance. Canada has become a leader among NATO countries in language and peacekeeping training in Poland, with hundreds of Polish officers and senior general staff having received training in Canada and Poland.

== Development ==
The Canadian International Development Agency (CIDA) has committed $75 million for technical cooperation projects in Poland in the 1990s to support the country's transformation. Those programs stopped in 2004 with Poland's accession to the EU. Canada's support has evolved and the two countries now jointly fund development projects in third countries. CIDA's Official Development Assistance in Central Europe (ODACE) develops Poland's capacities as a donor of foreign aid.

Canadian Studies Centres and programmes are flourishing in Polish universities. To date, six Canadian Studies have been established and eight Polish universities offer numerous courses on Canada and the aspects of Canadian life.

== Trade ==
Poland is Canada's largest market in Central and Eastern Europe. In 2025, trade between both nations totaled US$5.3 billion. Canada's main exports to Poland include machinery, mineral ores, medical or surgical instruments and mineral fuel. Poland's exports to Canada include machinery, fur skins, furniture, electrical machinery, aircraft, and parts. In October 2016, Canada and the European Union (which includes Poland) signed the Comprehensive Economic and Trade Agreement.

== Investment ==
Poland's dynamic economy and its accession to the European Union in 2004 have created opportunities for the Canadian private sector. Priority sectors of opportunity include a wide range of infrastructure projects in the transportation and oil and gas sectors, aerospace, environmental products, science and technology (information technology and telecommunications), and defence and security products. Canadian investment in Poland was $264 million in 2015.

== Resident diplomatic missions ==
of Canada in Poland

- Warsaw (Embassy)

of Poland in Canada

- Ottawa (Embassy)
- Montreal (Consulate-General)
- Toronto (Consulate-General)
- Vancouver (Consulate-General)

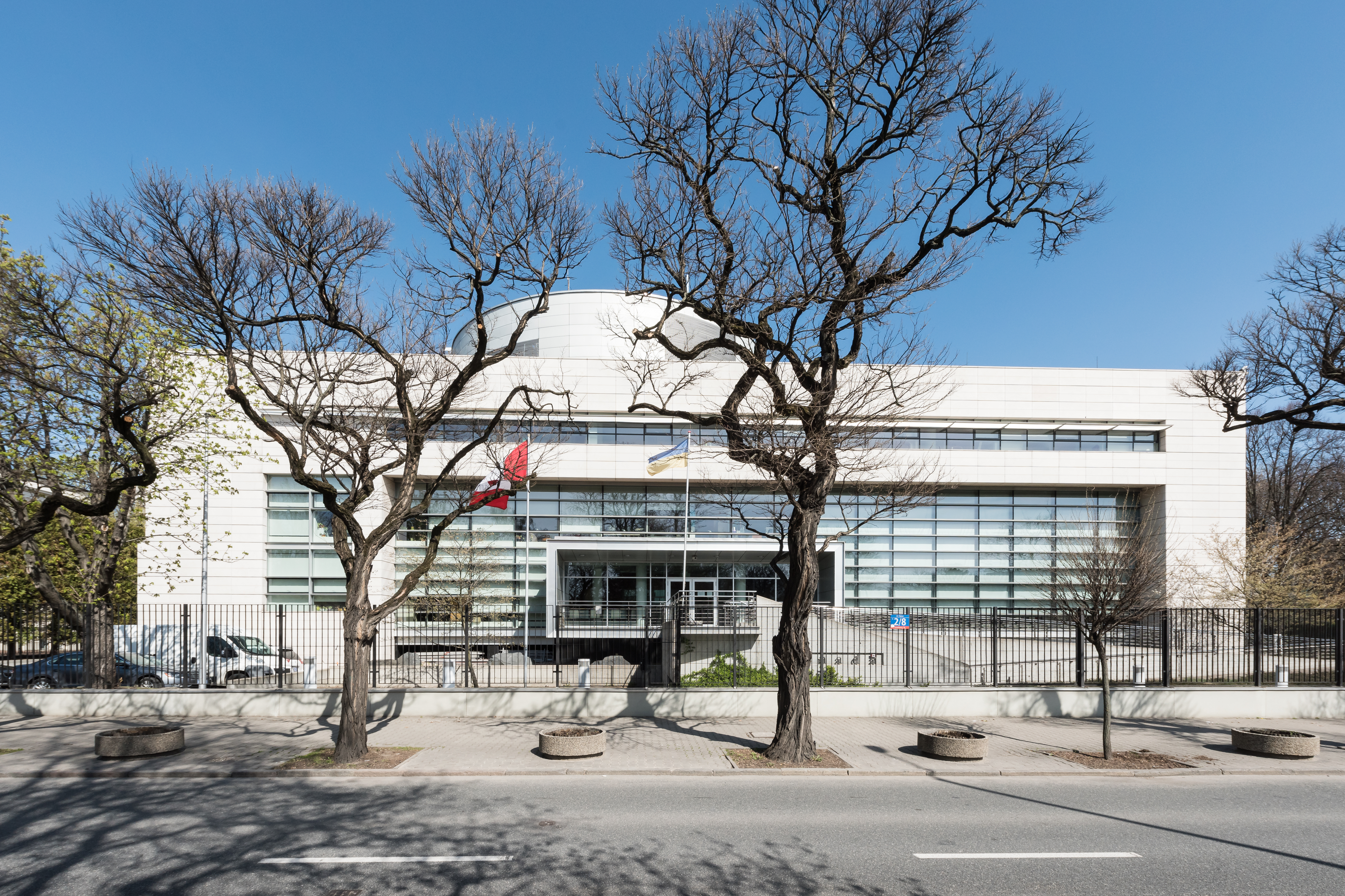
Embassy of Canada in Warsaw
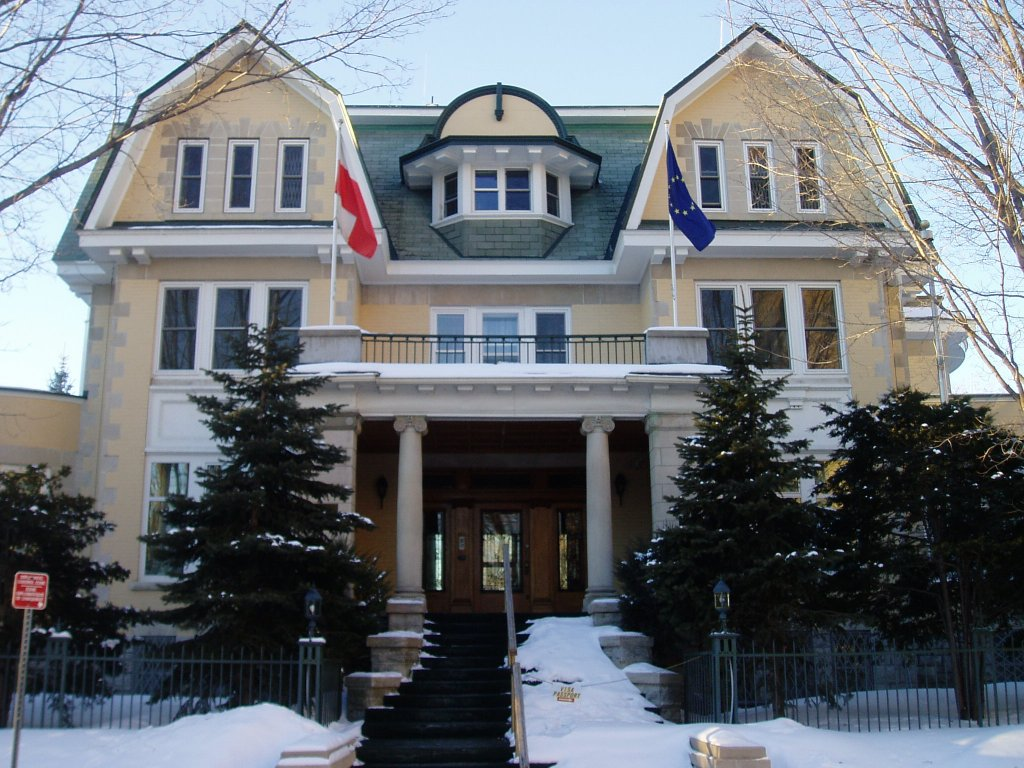
Embassy of Poland in Ottawa

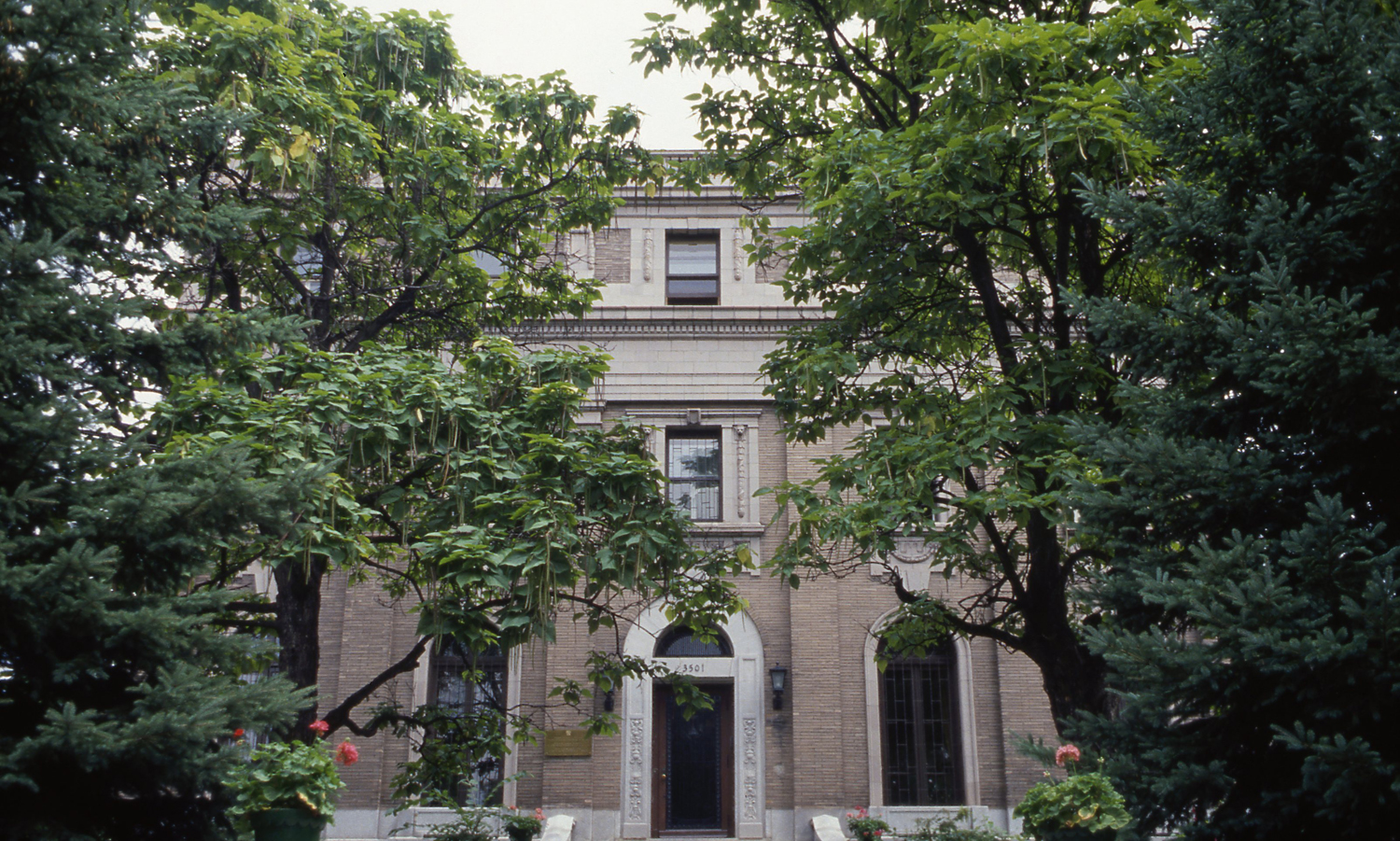
Consulate-General of Poland in Montreal

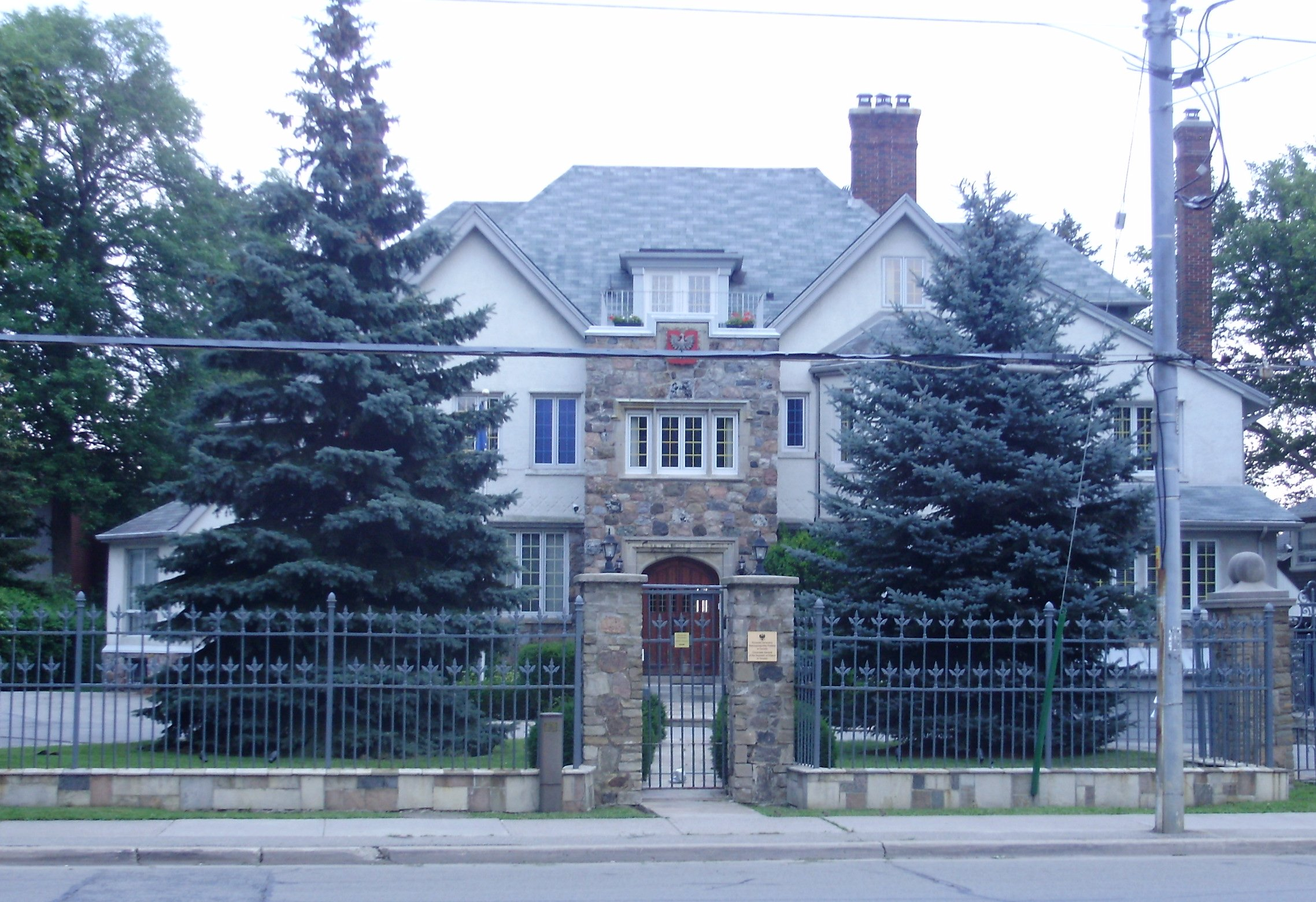
Consulate-General of Poland in Toronto

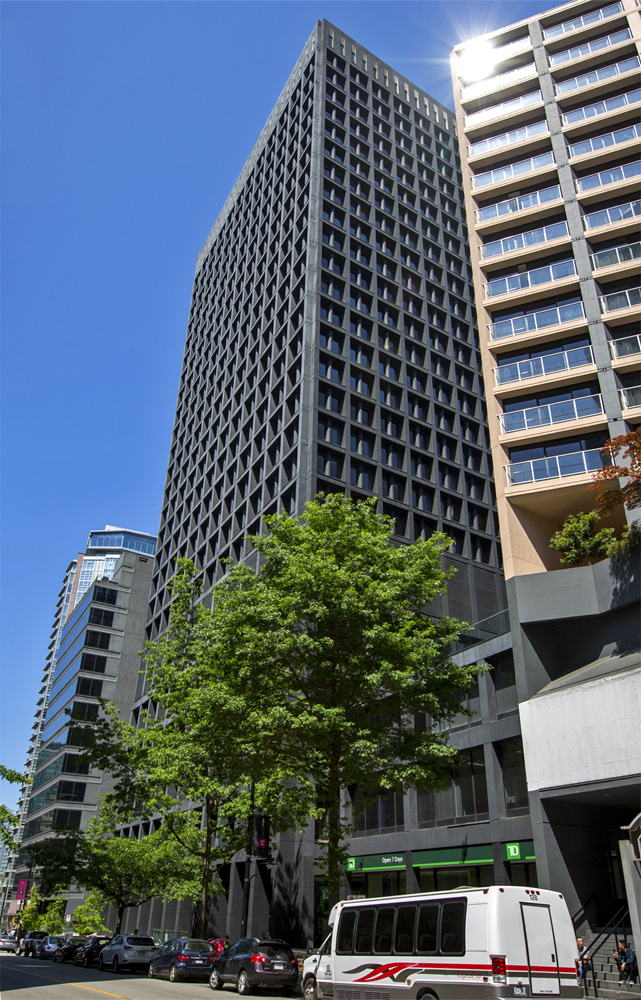
Building hosting the Consulate-General of Poland in Vancouver

== See also ==
- Embassy of Canada to Poland
- Polish Canadians
- Canada–EU relations

== Sources ==
- Bothwell, Robert (2000). "The Further Shore: Canada and Vietnam". International Journal. 56 (1): 89–114.
- Prymak, Thomas (2015). Gathering a Heritage: Ukrainian, Slavonic, and Ethnic Canada and the USA. Toronto: University of Toronto Press. ISBN 978-1442665507.
- Morton, Desmond (1999). A Military History of Canada. Toronto: McClelland & Stewart. ISBN 0-7710-6514-0.
- Rothwell, Victor (2001). The Origins of the Second World War. Manchester: Manchester University Press.
