= Tadeusz Brzeziński =

Polish diplomat

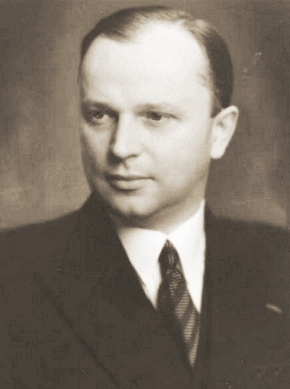
Tadeusz Brzeziński

Tadeusz Brzeziński (February 21, 1896 – January 7, 1990) was a Polish diplomat and consular official. He was the father of Zbigniew Brzeziński, President Jimmy Carter's national security adviser.

== Life and career ==
Brzeziński was born in the town of Złoczów, in what was then the Austro-Hungarian Empire (today Zolochiv, Lviv Oblast, Ukraine), the son of Zofia (Woroniecka) and Kazimierz Brzeziński. He received his university education in Lwów (now Lviv), and in Vienna. As a volunteer in the Polish independence movement from 1918 to 1920, Brzeziński saw action in the Battle of Lwów during the Polish-Ukrainian War and against Soviet forces in the final Warsaw campaign of 1920. He entered the diplomatic-consular service of the new Polish Republic, serving in Essen, Germany; Lille, France; Leipzig, Germany; Kharkov, in the Soviet Ukraine (during the Great Purge on 1 November 1936 – 16 December 1937), and Montreal, where he lived after the Communist takeover in Poland after World War II.

While in Leipzig, Germany, before World War II, Brzeziński became involved in efforts to rescue European Jews from Nazi concentration camps. In 1978, his efforts on behalf of the Jewish people were recognized by Prime Minister of Israel Menachem Begin.

Brzeziński was consul-general in Montreal from 1938 until the Communist takeover of Poland at the end of World War II. He served as president of the Canadian Polish Congress from 1952 to 1962, and in 1975 helped create the World Polish Congress. Until his retirement, he worked for the Quebec Ministry of Culture, setting up French-language centres in small towns.

Brzeziński died of pneumonia in Montreal at the age of 93. He was survived by his two sons: Zbigniew Brzeziński, President Jimmy Carter's national security advisor; and Lech Brzeziński, an engineer also living in Montreal. His grandsons are foreign policy expert Ian Brzeziński, lawyer and US Ambassador to Poland Mark Brzeziński, and journalist Matthew Brzeziński. His granddaughter Mika Brzezińska is a political commentator and host of Morning Joe.

== See also ==
=== Archives ===
There is a Tadeusz Brzeziński fonds at Library and Archives Canada. The archival reference number is R3920.

== Sources ==
- Aleksandra Ziolkowska-Boehm, Dreams and Reality, Toronto 1984, ISBN 0-9691756-0-4
- Aleksandra Ziolkowska-Boehm, Kanada, Kanada, Warsaw 1986, ISBN 83-7021-006-6
- Aleksandra Ziolkowska-Boehm, Untold Stories of Polish Heroes From World War II, Hamilton Books | Rowman & Littlefield 2018, ISBN 978-0-7618-6983-2
