= Copenhagen Declaration =

The Copenhagen Declaration is a text agreed by the CSCE in June 1990 at Copenhagen. It contains specific election-related commitments.

Yuri Reshetov, the head of the Soviet delegation dubbed it the new European constitution. His American counterpart, Max Kampelman, labelled it "a programme for democratic action".

NATO is of the opinion that "At the Copenhagen CSCE Conference on the Human Dimension, Eastern European countries (excluding Albania, which joined the CSCE process in June 1991) commit themselves to multiparty parliamentary democracy and to the rule of law." The document was part of the legacy of President George Bush.

== Signatories ==
- Austria
- Belgium
- Bulgaria
- Canada
- Cyprus
- Czechoslovakia
- Denmark
- Finland
- France
- German Democratic Republic
- Federal Republic of Germany
- Greece
- Holy See
- Hungary
- Iceland
- Ireland
- Italy
- Liechtenstein
- Luxembourg
- Malta
- Monaco
- Netherlands
- Norway
- Poland
- Portugal
- Romania
- San Marino
- Spain
- Sweden
- Switzerland
- Turkey
- Union of Soviet Socialist Republics
- United Kingdom
- United States of America
- Yugoslavia
