= Polish Cultural Society =

The Polish Culture Society of Edmonton is a society based in Edmonton, Alberta, Canada, supporting the development of Polish culture.

== History ==
Established in 1971 in Edmonton, Alberta by a group of Polish emigrants, among whom was a renowned professor of University of Alberta, demographer Dr.Karol Józef Krótki.

== Mission ==
The Society’s main goal is the preservation, promotion and development of Polish culture, Polish language, traditions and customs within a Canadian context.

== Chopin 2010 Celebration ==
The Polish Culture Society of Edmonton has taken a leadership role working with the Polish Consulate in Alberta in preparation for this global event. Through the society, CHOPIN2010 Celebration Committee was formed to prepare, coordinate, and bring a series of independent Chopin Celebrations to life.
