= Karol Józef Krótki =

Polish-Canadian demographer (1922–2007)

- Born: 15 May 1922; Cieszyn, Poland
- Died: 6 June 2007 (aged 85); Edmonton, Alberta, Canada
- Occupations: Demographer; University professor
- Spouse: Joanna Elzbieta Krotki (nee Patkowska)
- Children: Karol Jr. Krotki, Jan Krotki, Filip Krotki

Karol Józef Krótki, FRSC (15 May 1922 – 6 June 2007) was a renowned Polish Canadian demographer who, at various times, lived and worked in Poland, the United Kingdom, Sudan, Pakistan, Morocco and Canada. Professor Krotki was elected to the Royal Society of Canada in 1979.

== Early life ==
Karol Krotki was born in 1922 in Cieszyn, Poland. Following German and Soviet Union invasion of Poland in 1939 Krotki, still a teenager fled the country on foot. Eventually he enrolled in the British Army and took part in the battles of North Africa. Later he joined the Royal Air Force in the United Kingdom, where he distinguished himself for bravery.

== Education ==
Bachelor of Arts (Honors) in Economics (1946–1948), Cambridge University

Master of Arts in Economics with Statistics (1952), Cambridge University

PhD in Economics (1960) Princeton University

Dissertation, Estimating Vital Rates from Peculiar and Inadequate Age Distribution, supervised by Ansley J. Coale

== Professional activities ==
1949–1958 Khartoum, Sudan, at that time part of the British Dominion, Department of Statistics He worked on Sudan's first population census carried out between 1956 and 1958.

1960–1964 Karachi, Pakistan Research Adviser at the Institute of Economic Development in Karachi

1971–1972 Rabat, Morocco work in Centre de recherches et d’études démographiques

1964–1968 - Statistics Canada, known at that time as the Dominion Bureau of Statistics Dr. Krotki was in charge of managing demographic research, both substantive and methodological, population estimates and forecasting as well as the preparation towards the 1971 census, its methodology and content determination. He spearheaded the 1961 census monograph program.

1968–1990 University of Alberta, Edmonton, Canada, Department of Sociology, He was instrumental in establishing a strong demography program and the Population Research Laboratory at the university. He trained many students, in class and as supervisor to their MA and PhD research. In 1971 he was elected as a Fellow of the American Statistical Association. In 1983 Dr. Krotki was awarded the title of University Professor and after his retirement remained active as a Professor Emeritus.

== Personal Interests ==
Dr. Karol Jozef Krotki was one of the founding members of the Polish Culture Society of Edmonton in 1971. During his years in Africa Dr. Krotki kept personal memoirs and wrote a book about his experiences. In 1961 he tried to publish it in Poland, but the text was not approved for publication at that time. Eventually in 1995 the book was published in Poland under the title "W kraju białego nosorożca" (In the land of a white rhinoceros).

== Legacy ==
The Karol J Krotki Population Research Graduate Scholarship is endowed by the Society of Edmonton Demographers (the Alberta Endowment Fund for Demographic Research) to support sociology doctoral students doing advanced original research that is likely to make a significant contribution to the broad field of population studies.

== Publications ==
- Karol Józef Krótki; First population census of Sudan 1955/56 : 21 facts about the Sudanese; Khartoum, 1958
- K M Barbour; Karol Józef Krótki, Review of The Population of Sudan Review of 21 Facts about the Sudanese, Africa, Oct., 1960, vol. 30, no. 4, p. 411
- Sultan S Hashmi; Masihur Pahman Khan; Karol Józef Krótki; The people of Karachi : data from a survey; Publisher: Karachi : Pakistan Institute of Development Economics, 1964.
- Karol Józef Krótki; R C Muirhead; Richard Platek; Evaluation programme of the 1966 census of Canada; Publisher: Ottawa : Dominion Bureau of Statistics, 1967
- Karol Józef Krótki; H N Thakur; Estimates of population size and growth from the 1952–54 and 1961 censuses of the Kingdom of Nepal

Population Research Laboratory, University of Alberta, 1973.

- Eli Samplin Marks; William Seltzer; Karol Józef Krótki; Population Council, Population growth estimation : a handbook of vital statistics measurement, New York : Population Council; Bridgeport, Conn. : distributed for the Population Council by Key Book Service, ©1974
- "La population morocaine: reconstitution de l'évolution de 1950 à 1971," K.J. Krotki and R.P. Beaujot, Population 30(2): 335-367, March April 1975.
- Karol Józef Krótki; Bonnie Fox; The randomized response technique, the interview and the self-administered questionnaire : an empirical comparison of fertility of reports; Publisher: Alberta, Canada : University of Alberta, Dept. of Sociology, Population Research Laboratory, 1975
- Sultan S Hashmi; Karol Józef Krótki; Issues in demographic data collection in Pakistan...; Islamabad, Pakistan, Census Organisation, 1977
- Karol Józef Krotki; Jacqueline Hecht; An overview of fertility and KAP surveys in the Soviet Union and Eastern Europe, 1956 1972

Publisher: Hecht, Edmonton, Canada : Dept. of Sociology, the University of Alberta, 1977.

- Karol Józef Krótki; K Parveen; University of Alberta. Population Research Laboratory; Population size and growth in Pakistan based on early reports of 1972 census; Edmonton : Population Research Laboratory, University of Alberta, 1977
- Karol Józef Krótki; Susan A McDaniel; Three estimates of illegal abortion in Alberta, Canada : survey, mail back questionnaire and randomized response technique; Publisher: University of Alberta, Population Research Laboratory, Dept. of Sociology, 1977
- Karol Józef Krótki; Statistics Canada. Census and Household Survey Methods Division, Response error of the 1976 census of population and housing,

Ottawa : Statistics Canada, Census and Household Surveys Field, Survey Methods Division = Statistique Canada, Secteur du recensement et des enquêtes-ménages, Méthodes d'enquêtes recensement, 1980

- Karol Józef Krótki; University of Alberta. Population Research Laboratory; Linguistic assimilation in Canada and Alberta by age and sex : an objective estimate through life table techniques; Toronto: Micromedia, 1981
- Karol Józef Krotki; Language loyalties among amerindians and Inuit; Publisher: Edmonton, Canada : University of Alberta, Dept. of Sociology, 1981
- Balakrishnan, T.R., K.V. Rao, E. Lapierre-Adamcyk and K.J. Krotki. 1987. "A hazard model analysis of the covariates of marriage dissolution in Canada." Demography, Vol. 24, No. 3, pp. 395–406.
- T. R. Balakrishnan, K. Vaninadha Rao, Karol J. Krotki and Evelyne Lapierre-Adamcyk (1988). Age at first birth and lifetime fertility. Journal of Biosocial Science, 20, pp 167–174 doi:10.1017/S0021932000017405
- Karol Józef Krótki; Dave Odynak; The emergence of multiethnicities in 1981 and 1986 : their sociocultural significance; Edmonton : Population Research Laboratory, University of Alberta, 1990
- Balakrishnan, T.R., E. Lapierre-Adamcyk and K.J. Krotki. 1993. Family and Childbearing in Canada: A Demographic Analysis. Toronto: Univ. of Toronto Pr.
- Karol Józef Krótki, W kraju białego nosorożca, Wydawnictwo FORMA, Kraków 1995, ISBN 83-902965-0-0
