= American Committee for Peace in Chechnya =

Private, non-governmental organization

American Committee for Peace in Chechnya is a private, non-governmental organization (NGO) in North America. It was founded in 1999 who exclusive stated aim was to promote a peaceful resolution to the separatist insurgency in Chechnya (Second Chechen war). Chaired by former National Security Advisor Zbigniew Brzezinski, former Secretary of State Alexander M. Haig and former Congressman Stephen J. Solarz, the committee is composed of more than one hundred distinguished Americans representing both major political parties and nearly every walk of life.

The Committee operates out of the offices of Freedom House. The organisation has been described as a neoconservative organisation, featuring members such as Elliott Abrams, Kenneth Adelman, Eliot Cohen, Midge Decter, Frank Gaffney, Robert Kagan, and William Kristol. It has ties with the right-wing think tank the Jamestown Foundation, with which it publishes Chechnya Weekly.

The Committee's mission encompasses three distinct yet interrelated objectives:

Advocacy: Developing and promoting policies, through the U.S. government and international institutions, aimed at protecting civilians, improving conditions for refugees and securing a cease-fire;
Information: Advancing public awareness of the Chechen separatists cause, including its broader implications for democracy, human rights, and regional stability in both Russia and the former Soviet Union; and
Diplomacy: Convening private "Track II" talks between representatives of the Russian government and Chechen separatists militants, aimed at developing a framework for ending the war and resolving Chechnya's long-term legal and political status.
