= Canadian Polish Congress =

Canadian not-for-profit organization

- Logo of the Canadian Polish Congress (KPK)
- Established: 1944
- President: Dominik Roszak
- Location: Toronto
- Website: www.kpk.org

The Canadian-Polish Congress (Polish: Kongres Polonii Kanadyjskiej, KPK, CPC) is a Canadian not-for-profit organization. The Canadian Polish Congress serves as the central umbrella organization for some 150 affiliated Polish-Canadian social, cultural, charitable, educational and professional organizations throughout Canada. The organisation listed on the WM Fares Wall of Tribute was founded in 1944, it is the main advocacy group for the Polish community in Canada and promotes awareness of Poland's history and cultural heritage, and the contribution of Polish Canadians to Canadian institutions, culture and society. Its subdivided area of activity spreads all over Canada and includes districts of Alberta, British Columbia, Manitoba, Ontario and Quebec.

== History ==
The organization was federally integrated on 7 February 1933 in Winnipeg, Manitoba, and was initially known as the Federation of Polish Societies in Canada. The KPK was founded in 1944 or 1948 as an umbrella association of 115 different organizations. From the beginning, prior to the arrival of exiled Polish combatants in 1946, the KPK was political, excluding communists from the organization and supporting the Polish government-in-exile. In the post-war period, the KPK was dominated by WWII veterans associated with the Polish Combatants Association.

In the 1950s, under the presidency of Tadeusz Brzeziński, the KPK was involved in the transfer of the Wawel Castle treasures and a number of Chopin manuscripts, under its safekeeping since World War II, to Poland.

In 1973, the left of centre Polish Alliance of Canada (PAC, founded in 1907) left the KPK in disagreement over the proponents of total independence of Poland that controlled the KPK, the close ties between the KPK and the government in exile, and accusations that the PAC was pro-communist. The disagreement between the PAC and KPK started to surface in the late 1960s, with the PAC advocating that the main focus of Polish-Canadian organizations should be assimilation and integration in Canada while promoting Polish culture, and opposing a non-Canadian political focus. In 1982, following the emergence of Solidarity, the PAC rejoined the KPK.

The KPK spearheaded the construction of the Katyn monument in Toronto in 1980, being the first such monument in the world erected in a public place.

The KPK was a vocal supporter of Poland’s Solidarity movement. In 1981 and 1982, the KPK staged widespread protests in Canadian cities in support of Solidarity and in opposition to the Soviet Union and the imposition of martial law in Poland. The KPK, in what Clements describes as "the most contentious tone the CPC [KPK] had recorded in its history", urged the Canadian government to take action against the Polish authorities and to accept Polish political refugees. KPK's demands were largely rejected by Canadian Prime Minister Pierre Trudeau, though they did succeed in getting Trudeau to address Parliament in January 1982 in support of loosening the martial law restrictions in Poland.

The KPK spearheaded the founding of the Chair of Polish History at the University of Toronto and established the Council for the Support of Polish Studies at the University of Toronto to sustain Polish language and literature studies.

In 2014 the KPK was said to represent about 150 Polish-Canadian organizations. That year also saw an academic conference in Poland dedicated to the history and activities of the KPK. As of the mid-2010s, the KPK is involved in the construction of a Memorial to the Victims of Communism – Canada, a Land of Refuge in Ottawa.

On October 5th, 2024 a new board was voted in. President Dominik Roszak, Vice President Iwona Malinowska, second Vice President Michael Dembek.

== Views ==
The KPK's ideology is conservative, anti-communist, and supportive of the Catholic Church.

While Poland was under communist rule, the KPK distinguished between the government and the people of Poland. Member organizations were forbidden to have contact with the Polish government, and communists or those sympathetic to communists were barred from positions in KPK member organizations. The KPK supports the Catholic Church, and statements or resolutions in support of the Church have been made at nearly every KPK convention.

The KPK is engaged in information-providing and anti-defamation activities, and was instrumental in securing two rulings by the Ontario Press Council regarding the misuse of “Polish concentration camps.”

The KPK has advocated that a central focus of the "mass atrocities section" in the Canadian Museum for Human Rights should be on "the injury caused to Poles and other Eastern Europeans by Nazi Germany and Soviet Russia". The KPK protested against "rewriting history" in Our Class, a theatre play whose historical accuracy has been questioned by others.

== Charitable Foundations ==
The following foundations are associated with the Canadian Polish Congress:

- Charitable Foundation of the Canadian Polish Congress
- Canadian Polish Millennium Fund
- W. Reymont Foundation
- Adam Mickiewicz Foundation of Canada
- Polish Heritage Foundation of Canada

== See also ==
- Polish American Congress, a similar organization in the USA

=== Archives ===
There is a Canadian Polish Congress fonds at Library and Archives Canada. The archival reference number is R12243.
