= Maison Louis Carré =

Residential building

- Location within Île-de-France (region)

General information
- Type: Villa
- Architectural style: 20th century modernism
- Location: Bazoches-sur-Guyonne, Yvelines, Île-de-France, France
- Coordinates: 48.76994°N 1.85423°E
- Completed: 1959
- Owner: Association Alvar Aalto en France

Design and construction
- Architects: Alvar and Elissa Aalto

Maison Louis Carré (French pronunciation: [mɛzɔ̃ lwi kaʁe]) is a residential building in Bazoches-sur-Guyonne, France designed by Finnish modernist architects Elissa and Alvar Aalto.

The house was designed for art collectors Olga and Louis Carré, and completed in 1959. The couple had stayed in the house of Jean Monnet, a founding father of the European Union, while Monnet was stationed in Luxembourg. They appreciated the site located on the edge of the forest of Rambouillet and bought a piece of farmland nearby with a view to building a home that would also provide a showcase for their exceptional collection of modern and African art.

== Search for architect and construction ==
Carré began his search for an architect. He knew Le Corbusier well, having lived in one of his buildings in the 16th arrondissement of Paris. However, he had doubts that Le Corbusier’s strong predilection for concrete was suitable for his project. He was aware of Aalto’s work because the architect was famous in France after designing the Finnish Pavilion at the World Exhibition of 1937 in Paris.

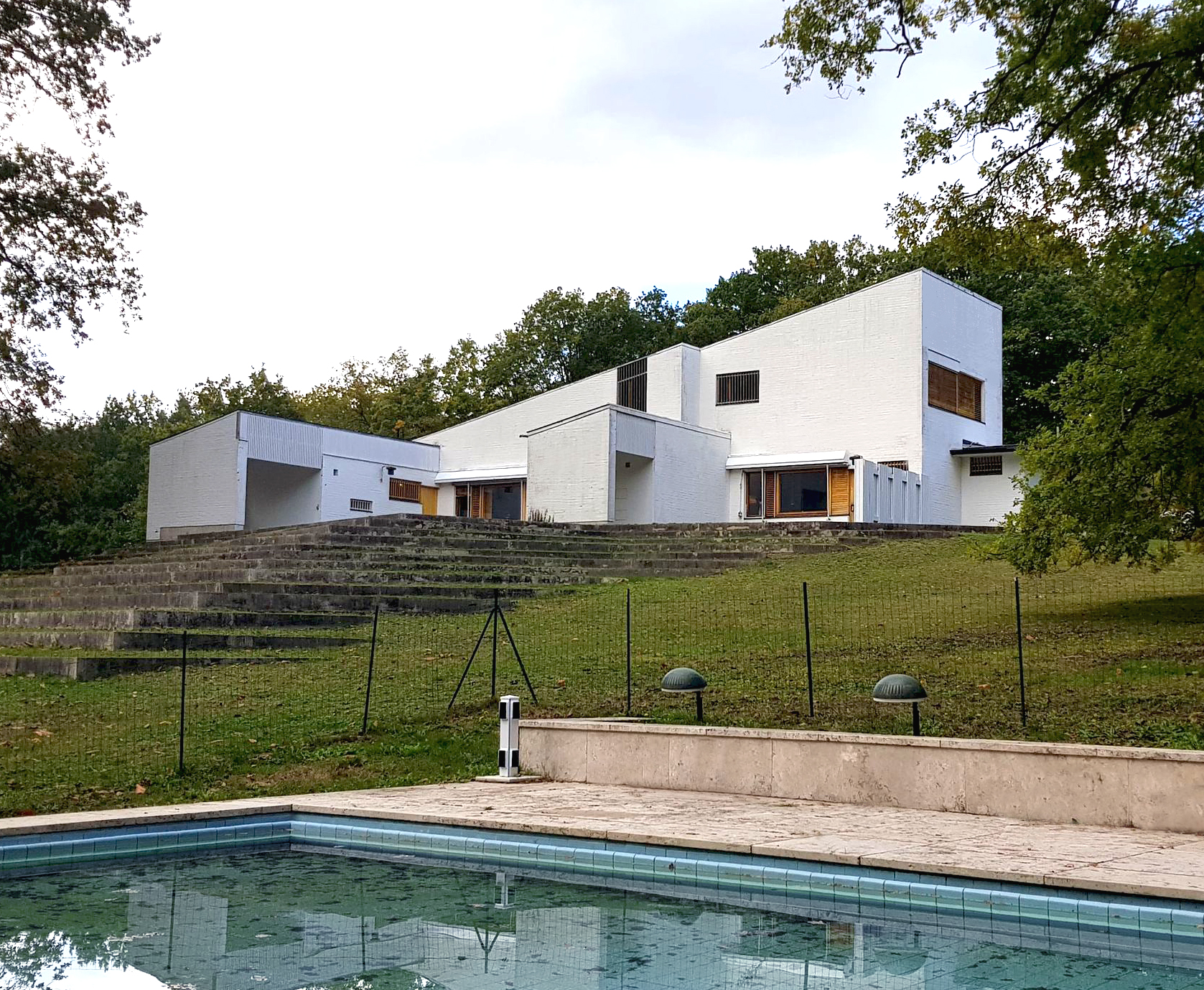

They exchanged letters and met at the Venice Biennial. Carré visited Finland to view several of Aalto’s projects and Aalto and his second wife, Elissa Aalto, visited the proposed construction site in 1956.

The building permit was filed in 1956. Elissa Aalto worked closely with her husband on the design of the project and was the on-site architect. Construction began in 1957 and the Louis and Olga Carré moved in June 1959.

== Design ==
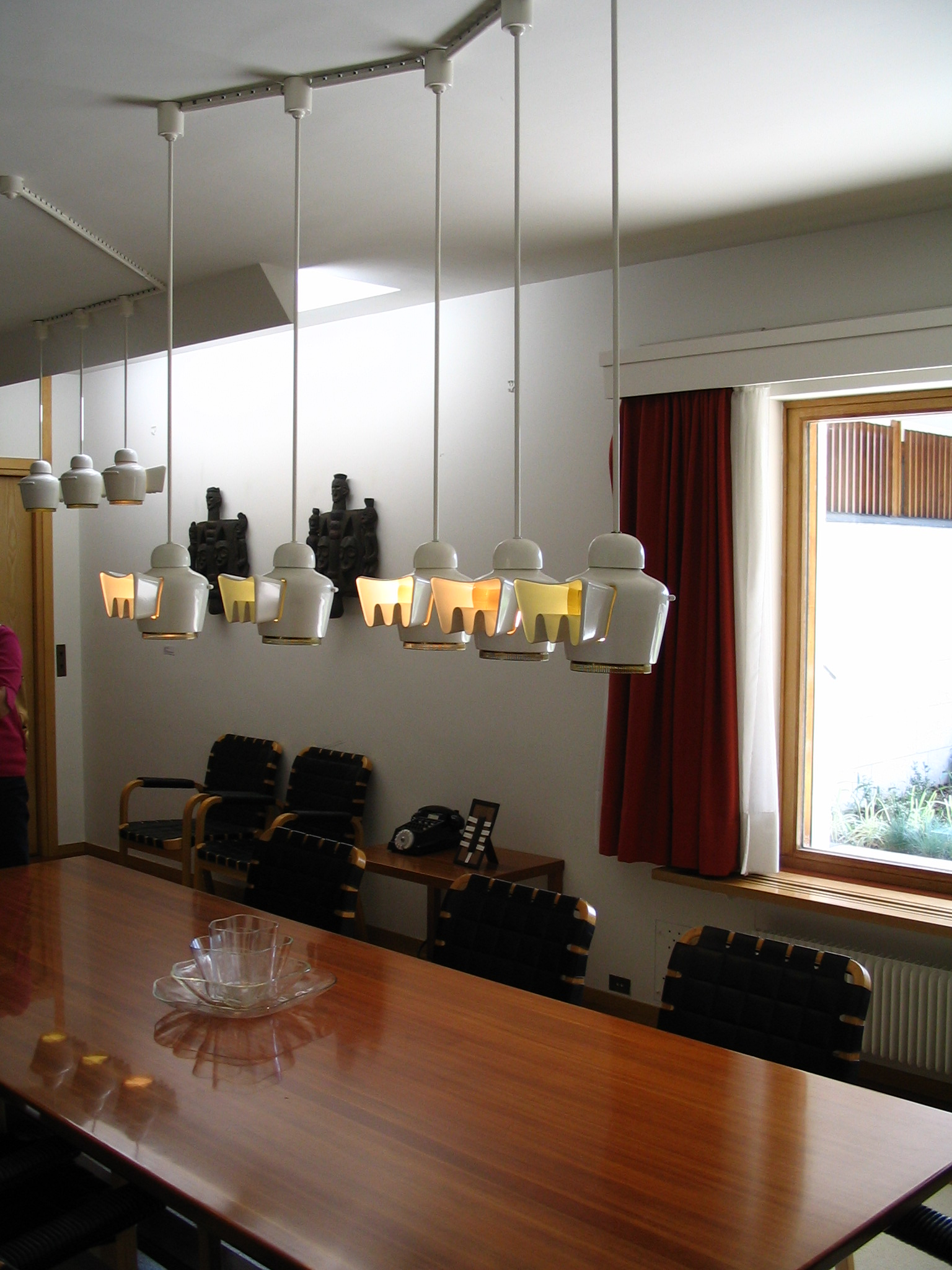
Lighting designed for the Maison Louis Carré. It is indirect during the day and both direct and indirect at night.

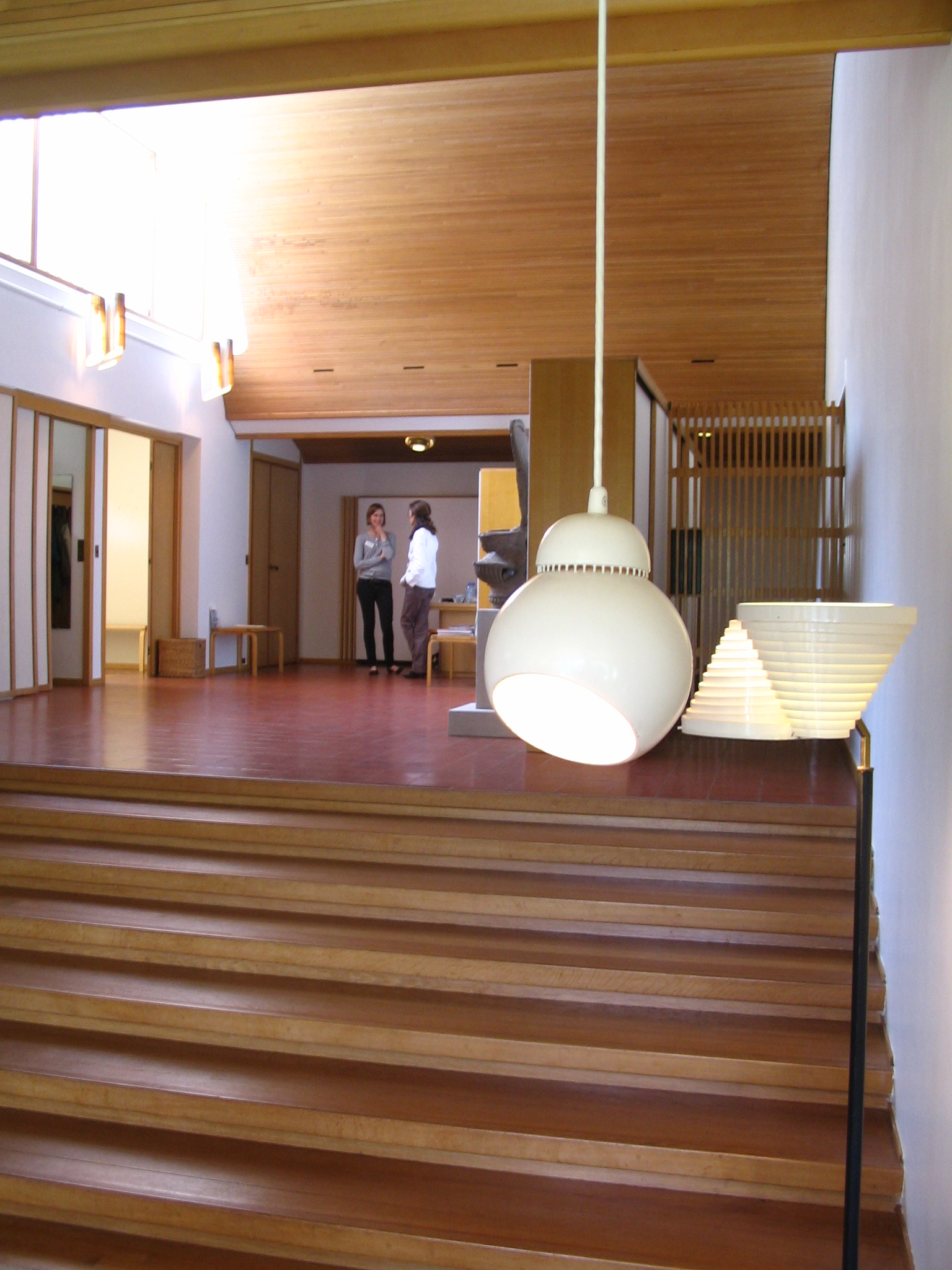
Reception area

The villa was designed both as a home and as a showcase for the Carré's extensive art collection. Its large reception area, garden and outdoor theater also provided settings for the couple’s many parties.

Aalto sited the house on the top of a hill, giving it pleasant views onto the landscape of the Ile de France. The house follows the downward slope of the site. This includes the slope of the roof itself; Carré’s only constraint on the Aaltos’ design prerogatives was that he wanted a sloping roof.

The building is constructed of concrete blocks clad in brick and limestone from Souppes-sur-Loing. Local sandstone – the same as for the Chartres Cathedral, 20 miles away – is also used. The roof, made of Angers slate, features copper gutters terminating in spouts that discharge rainwater into circular basins. The roof overhangs are supported by copper pillars filled with concrete. These pillars are covered with teak wood panels. The interior spaces make extensive use of several types of wood, especially pinewood imported from Finland.

A notable feature of the house is that both its interior and exterior were fully designed by Alvar or Elissa Aalto. This holds not only for the layout, but also for the lighting, furniture, rugs, textiles and even the doorknobs. The Carré’s brought no furniture of their own. All interior furnishings are either unique pieces designed specifically for the house or they are from the Artek collection. Aarto also designed the entry gate, garden, swimming pool and outbuildings.

== Subsequent use ==
The villa is the only remaining building by Aalto in France. It was classified as a historical monument on July 5, 1996. In 2006, the Alvar Aalto Association in France acquired it for preservation and public use. It has been open to the public since 2007.

== Gallery ==

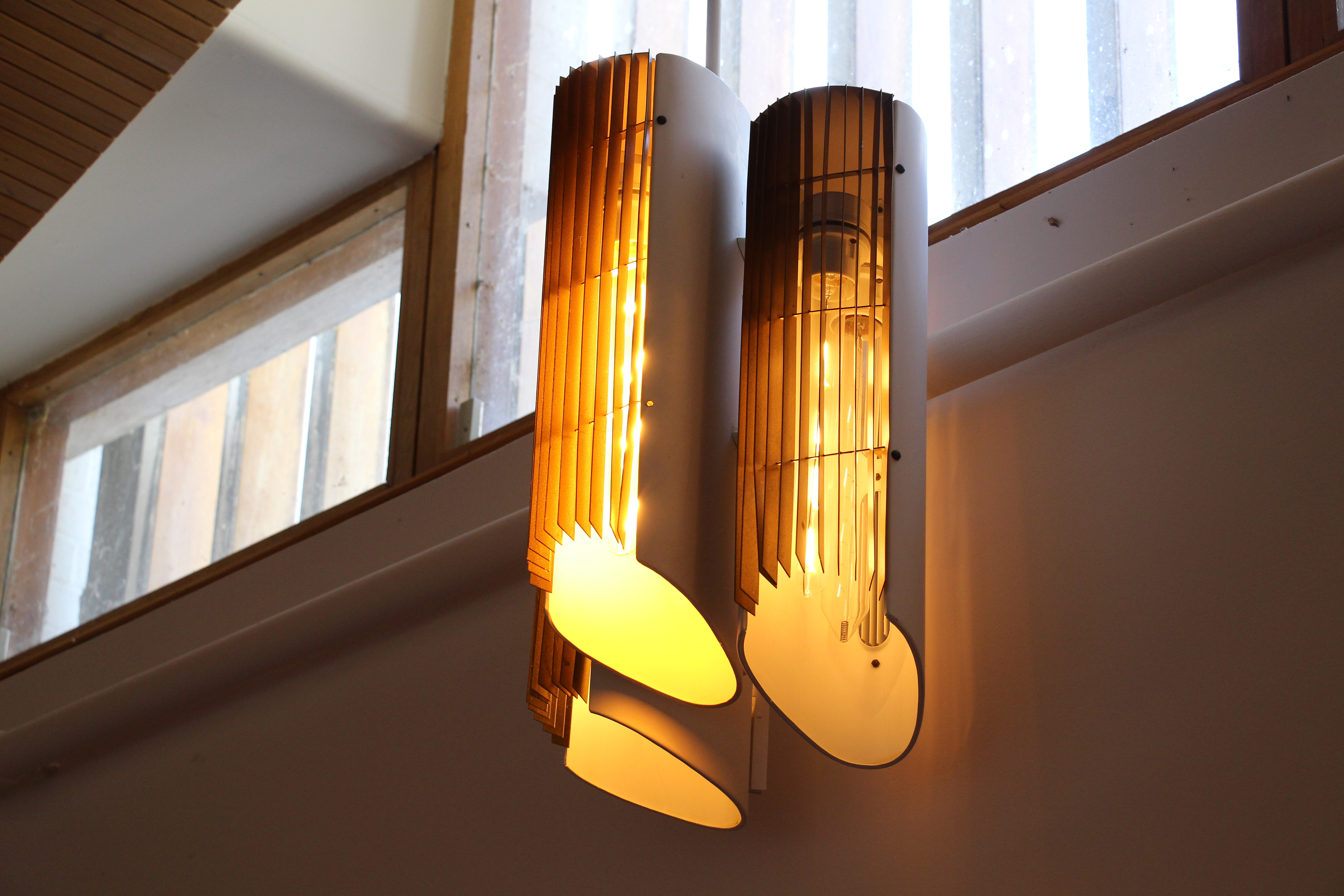

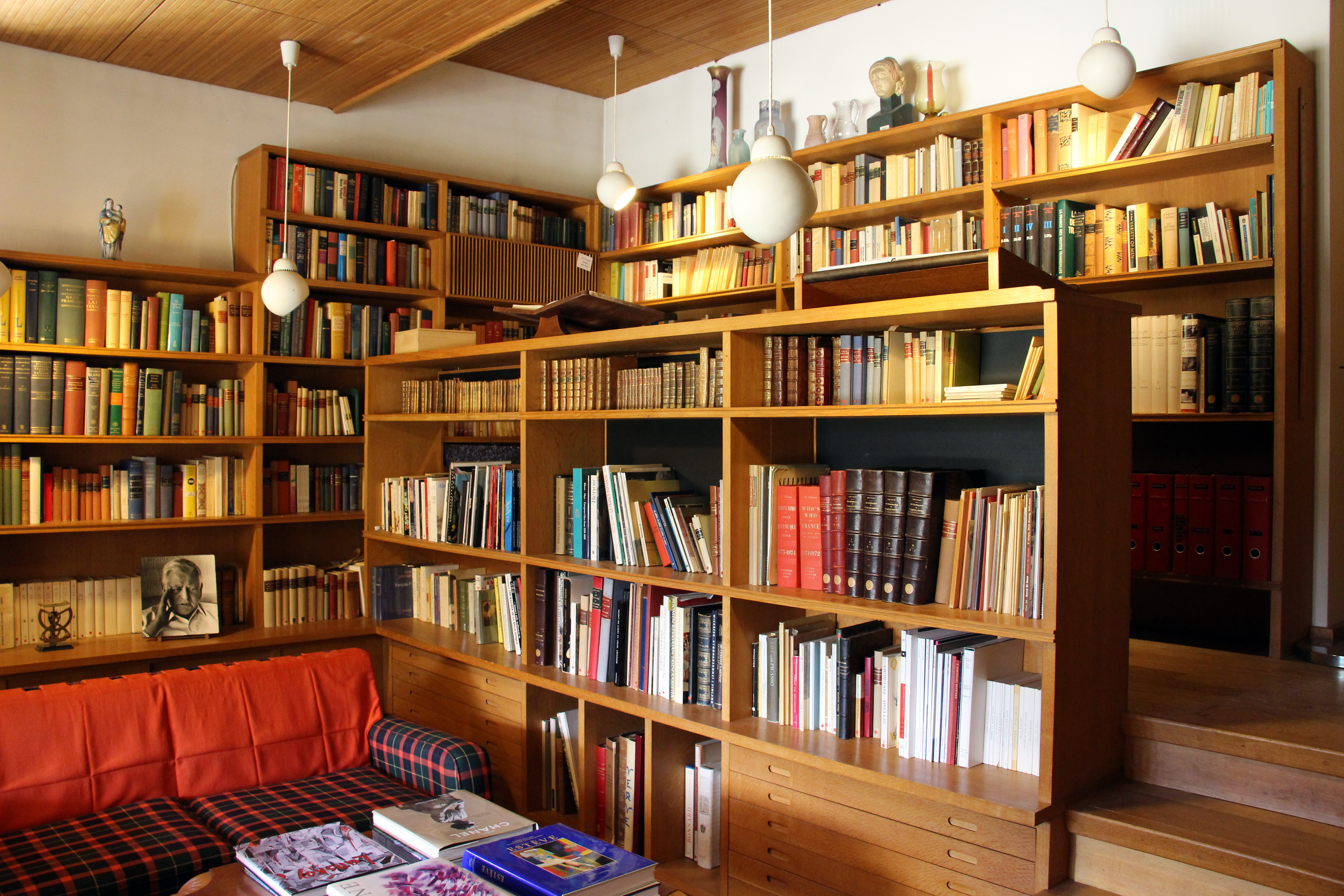
