= Attolico =

Attolico is an Italian surname. Notable people with the surname include:

- Bernardo Attolico (1880–1942), Italian diplomat, ambassador to Germany 1935–40
- Francesco Attolico (born 1963), Italian athlete
