= Jean Monnet =

European statesman

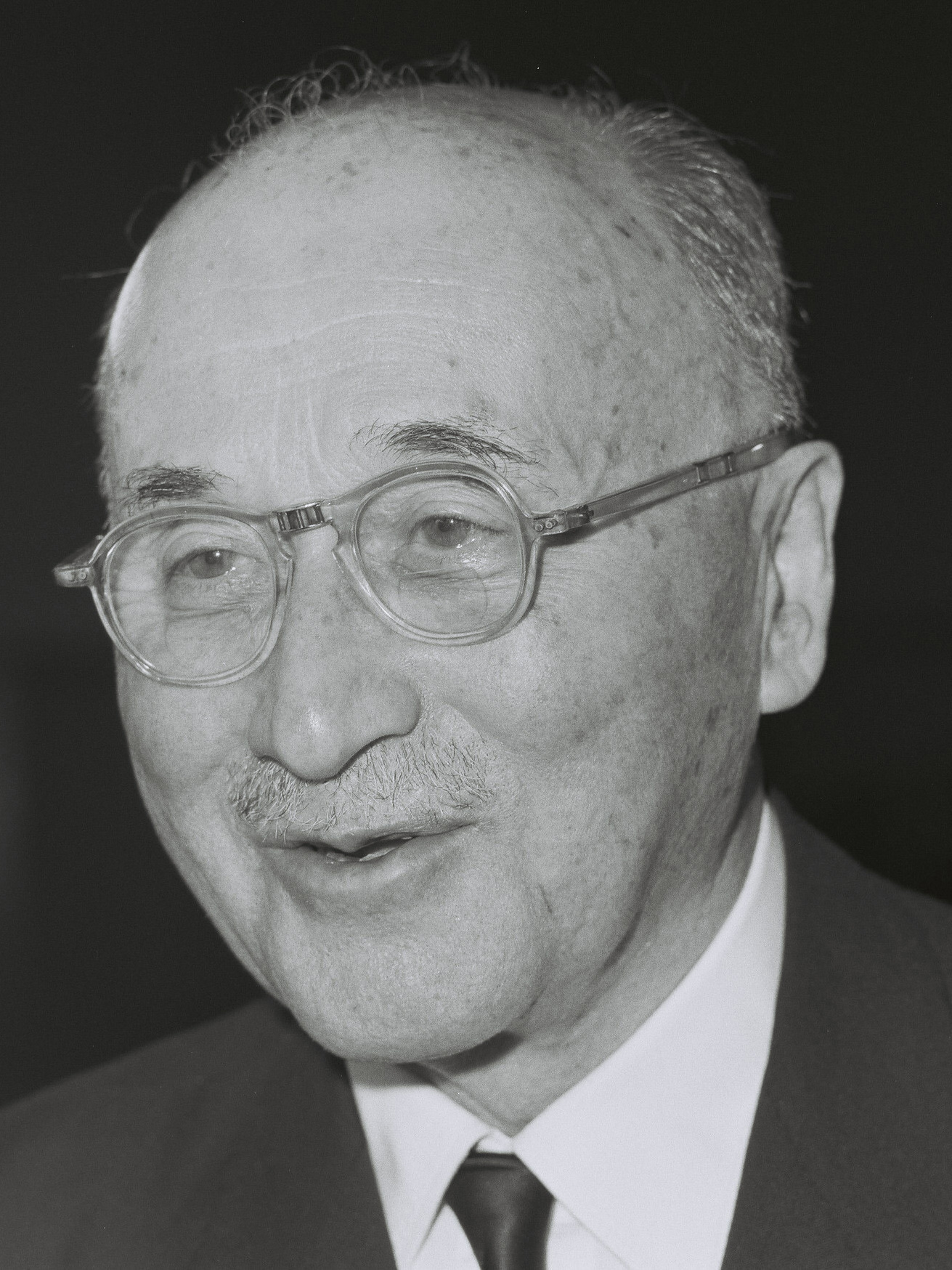
- Monnet in 1967

President of the High Authority of the European Coal and Steel Community
- In office 10 August 1952 – 3 June 1955
- Preceded by: Office created
- Succeeded by: René Mayer

Commissioner of the French Plan Commission
- In office 3 January 1946 – 11 September 1952
- Preceded by: Office created
- Succeeded by: Étienne Hirsch

Deputy Secretary-General of the League of Nations
- In office 10 June 1919 – 31 January 1923
- Preceded by: Office created
- Succeeded by: Joseph Avenol

Personal details
- Born: Jean Omer Marie Gabriel Monnet; 9 November 1888 Cognac, Charente, France
- Died: 16 March 1979 (aged 90) Houjarray, Bazoches-sur-Guyonne, France
- Resting place: Panthéon, Paris, France; 48°50′46″N 2°20′45″E
- Spouse: Silvia de Bondini (m. 1934)
- Profession: Négociant, diplomat, public administrator

Jean Omer Marie Gabriel Monnet (French: [ʒɑ̃ mɔnɛ]; 9 November 1888 – 16 March 1979) was a French civil servant, entrepreneur, diplomat, financier, and administrator. An influential supporter of European unity, he is considered one of the founding fathers of the European Union.

Jean Monnet has been called "The Father of Europe" by those who see his innovative and pioneering efforts in the 1950s as the key to establishing the European Coal and Steel Community, the predecessor of today's European Union. Although Monnet was never elected to public office, he worked behind the scenes of American and European governments as a well-connected "pragmatic internationalist".

For three decades, Jean Monnet and Charles de Gaulle had a multifaceted relationship, at some times cooperative and at other times distrustful, from a first encounter in London during the Battle of France in mid-June 1940 until De Gaulle's death in November 1970. Monnet and De Gaulle have been referred to together as "probably the two most outstanding Frenchmen of the 20th century". (Note: French: sans doute les plus exceptionnels Français du XXème siècle)

Jean Monnet was the first-ever individual to be designated as an Honorary Citizen of Europe in 1976. On the hundredth anniversary of his birth in 1988, his native country of France honoured Monnet's memory by transferring his mortal remains to the Panthéon in Paris.

== Early years ==
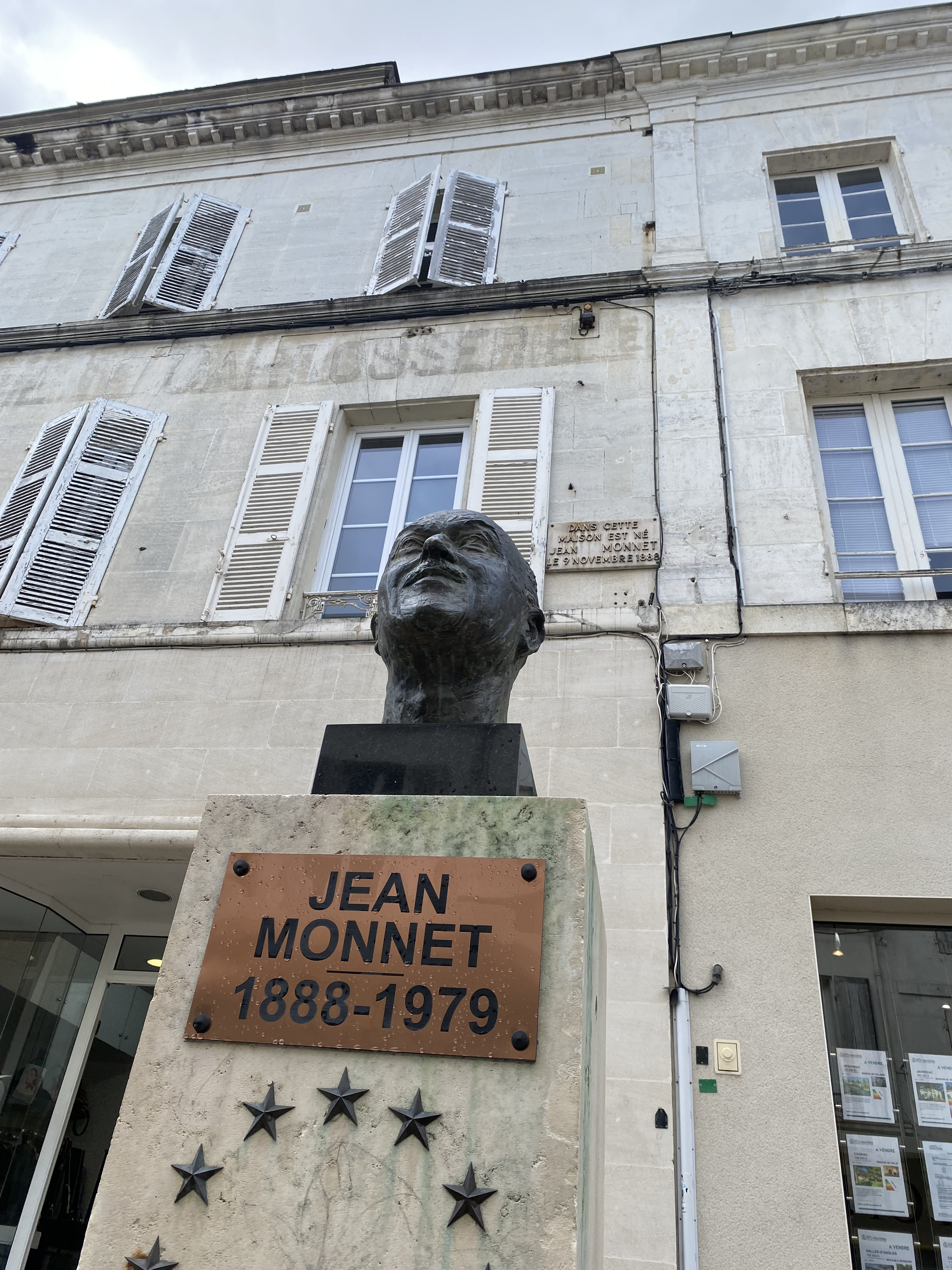
Monnet birthplace on 5 rue neuve des remparts in Cognac

Monnet was born in Cognac, a commune in the department of Charente in France, into a family of cognac merchants. According to Jacques-René Rabier, the values of laicism (secularism) and republicanism, as well as a strong Catholic tradition, co-existed in Monnet's family. His father, Jacques-Gabriel Monnet, had taken control of a mid-sized distiller and distributor of cognac and had it renamed in 1901 as J.-G. Monnet & Cie. His mother, née Marie Demelle, was deeply religious. His sister Marie-Louise was a founder of the French branch of Action Catholique, to which Monnet contributed financially. She would later introduce her brother to Pope Paul VI.

Monnet did not complete the baccalauréat qualification and instead travelled to the United Kingdom, where he lived in London learning business with Mr. Chaplin, an agent of J.-G. Monnet. Subsequently, he travelled widely – to Canada, the United States, Scandinavia, and Russia, for the family business, as well as Egypt for health reasons.

== World War I ==
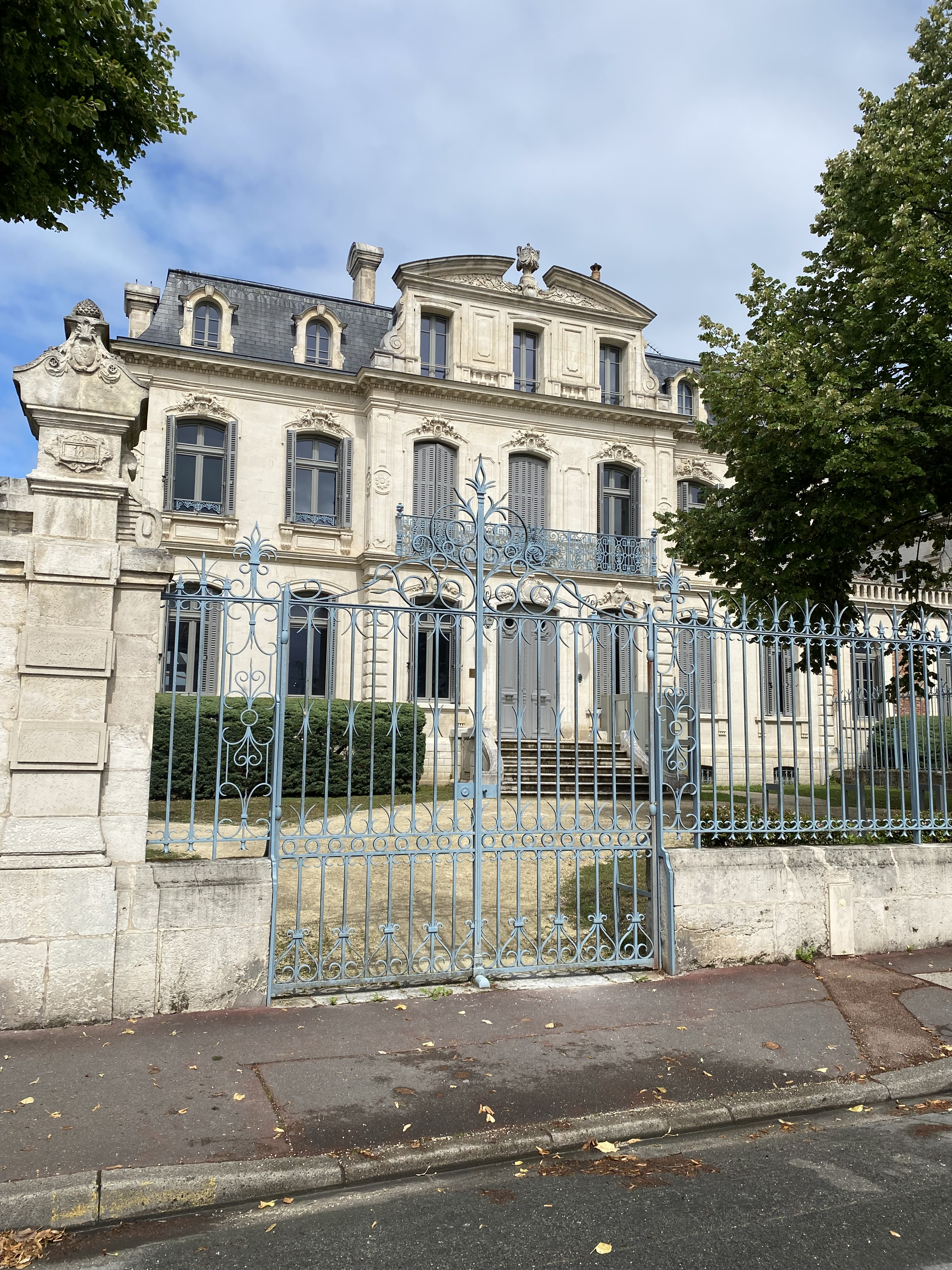
Monnet spent much of his youth in a mansion inside the Monnet Cognac compound, repurposed in 2018 as a hotel

Monnet firmly believed that the only path to an Allied victory lay in combining the war efforts of Britain and France, and he reflected on a concept that would coordinate war resources. In 1914, a friend of the family, Fernand Benon, arranged for young Monnet to meet French Premier René Viviani in Bordeaux to talk about this issue; Monnet managed to convince the French government to agree with him, in principle.

However, during the first two years of the war, Monnet did not have much success pressing for a better organization of the allied economic cooperation. It was not until two years later that stronger combined efforts, like the Wheat Executive (end of 1916) and the Allied Maritime Transport Council (end of 1917), were set into motion, adding to the overall war effort.

== Interwar period ==
At the Paris Peace Conference, Monnet was an assistant to the French minister of commerce and industry, Étienne Clémentel, who proposed a "new economic order" based on European cooperation. The scheme was officially rejected by the Allies in April 1919.

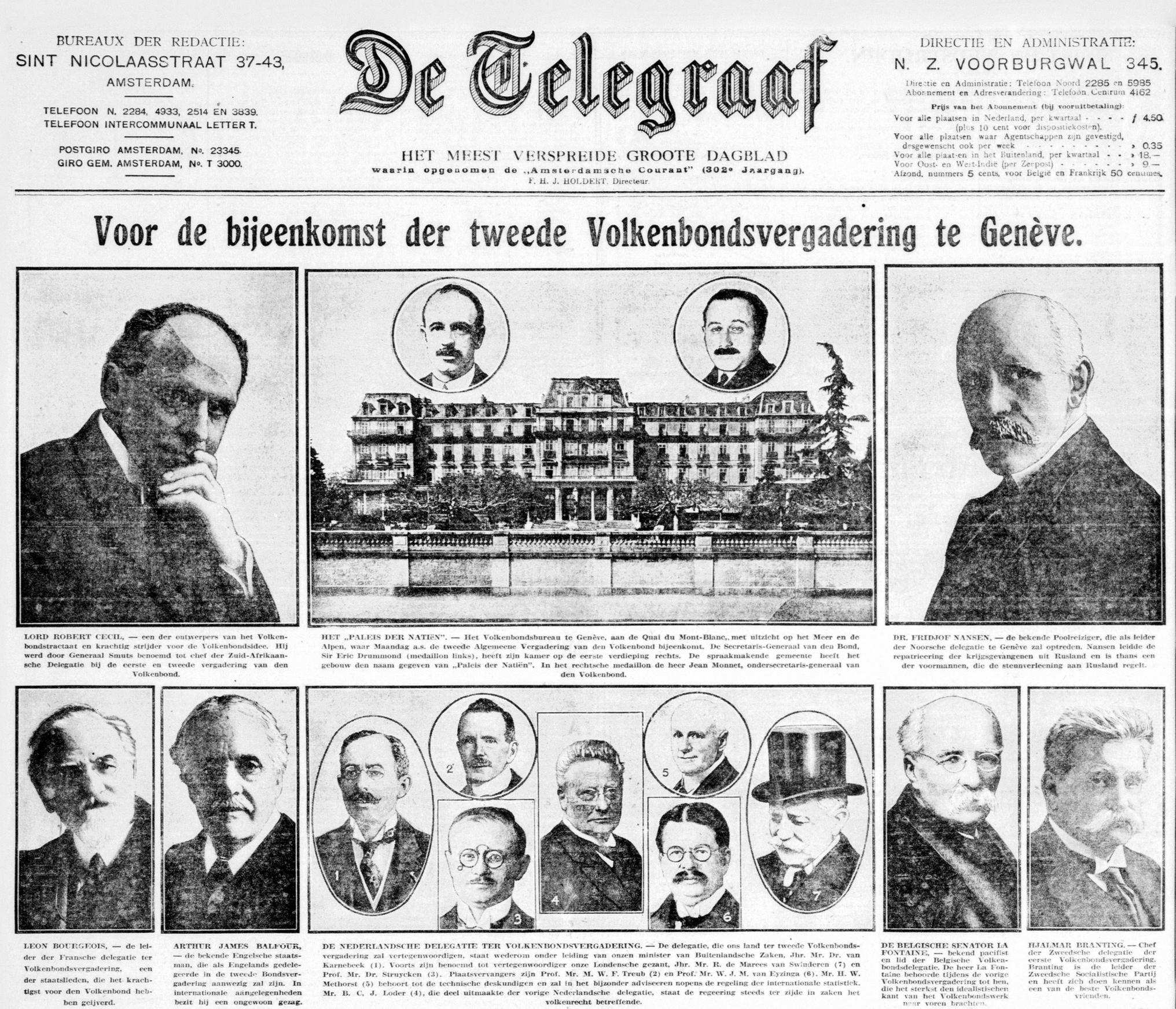
Front page of De Telegraaf, 4 September 1921, with central image featuring Monnet (right) together with Eric Drummond (left) as one of the two key officials of the League of Nations, above the Palais Wilson in Geneva

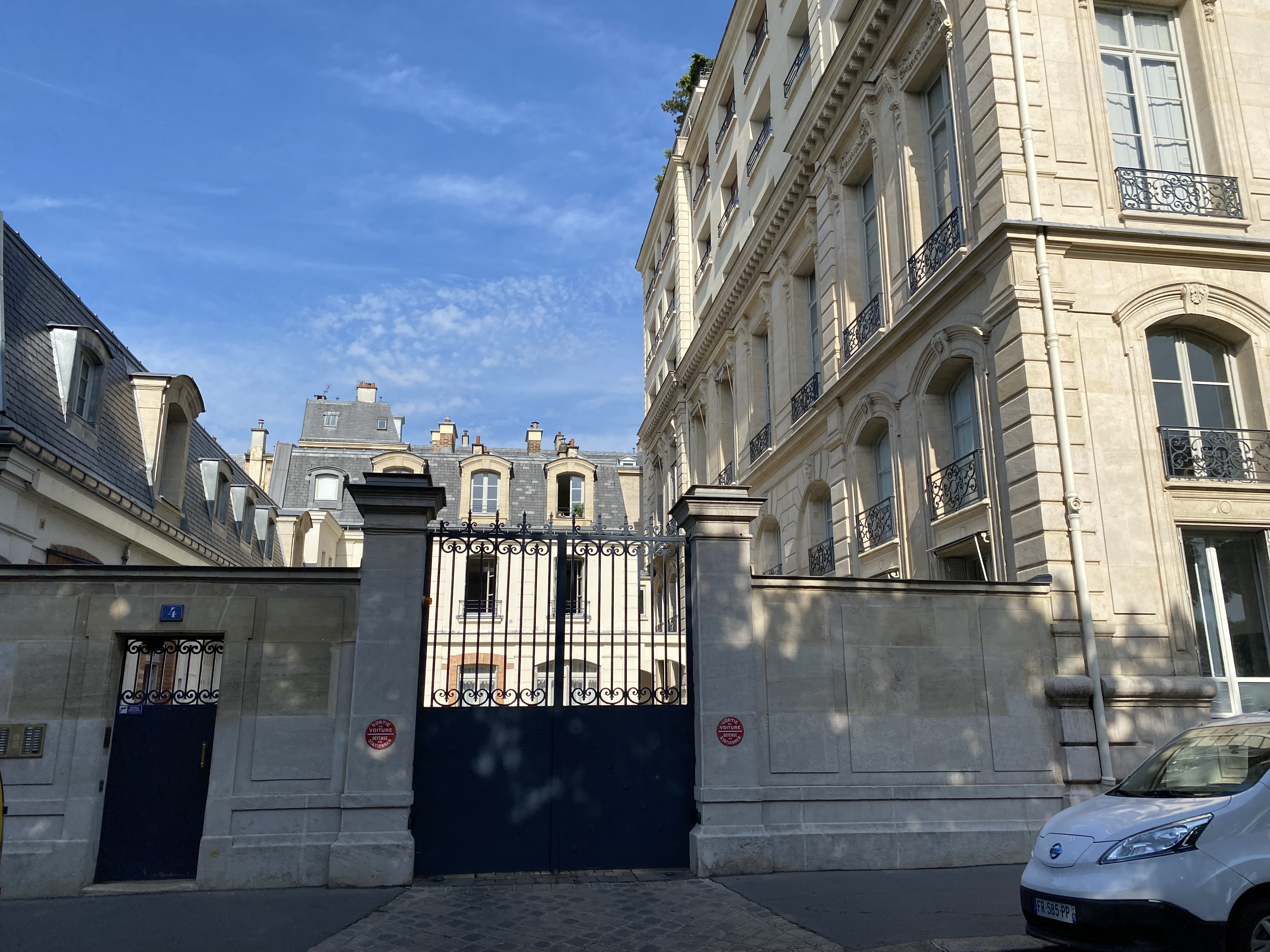
Jean Monnet's Parisian home in the late 1930s, at 4 rue Fabert

Due to his experience organizing inter-Allied committees during the war, Monnet was asked to take on the job of Deputy Secretary-General of the League of Nations by French premier Georges Clemenceau and British statesman Arthur Balfour, upon the League's creation in 1919 and after Élie Halévy had declined to take the position, which was reserved for a French national.

Monnet left the League of Nations at the end of 1922. He stated, "I certainly did not leave out of disenchantment with the League's weakness" and he believed "a great deal more could usefully be done." However, he felt it necessary to devote himself to managing the cognac family business, Monnet Cognac, which was experiencing difficulties.

In 1925, Monnet moved to America to accept a partnership in Blair & Co., a New York bank which merged with Bank of America in 1929, forming Bancamerica-Blair Corporation which was owned by Transamerica Corporation. He returned to international politics and, as an international financier, proved to be instrumental to the economic recovery of several Central and Eastern Europe nations. He helped stabilise the Polish złoty in 1927 and the Romanian leu in 1928.

In November 1932, the Chinese Minister of Finance invited Jean Monnet to act as chairman of an east–west non-political committee in China for the development of the Chinese economy, where he lived (with a six-month interruption) until early 1936. During his time in China, Monnet's task of partnering Chinese capital with foreign companies led to the formal inauguration of the China Development Finance Corporation (CDFC), as well as the reorganization of the Chinese railroads.

In 1935, when Monnet was still in Shanghai, he became a business partner of George Murnane (a former colleague of Monnet at Transamerica) in Monnet, Murnane & Co. Murnane was connected to the Wallenberg family in Sweden, the Bosch family in Germany, the Solvays and Boëls in Belgium, and John Foster Dulles, André Meyer, and the Rockefeller family in the United States. He was considered among the most connected persons of his time.

== World War II ==
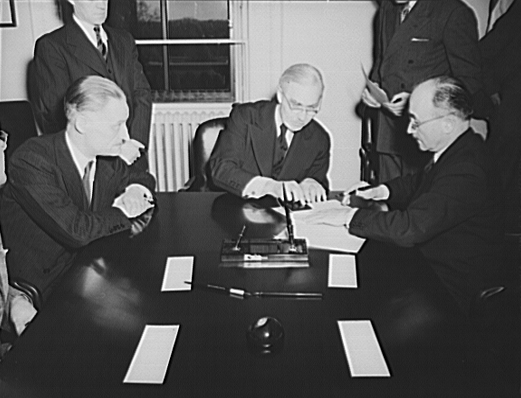
The agreement on lend-lease and reverse lend-lease. Jean Monnet, representative of the French Provisional Government signing agreements. Left to right: Henri Bonnet, French Ambassador, Joseph C. Grew, Undersecretary of State, and Jean Monnet.

In September 1939, French Prime Minister Édouard Daladier sent Monnet to London to coordinate the organization of Franco-British war supplies. Shortly after the invasion of France in May 1940, Monnet advocated for a Franco-British union because he believed victory was impossible if “the two countries did not act and fight as a single people and if the two nations were not completely and profoundly aware of their unity." Winston Churchill supported the union, as did Charles de Gaulle and the French prime minister, Paul Reynaud, but the French cabinet was opposed and France instead pursued an armistice with Germany.

Following the failure of the France-UK union attempt, Monnet hosted de Gaulle for a dinner at his London home on 17 June 1940, during which de Gaulle first articulated and tested the themes of the historic appeal he would announce on radio the next day. Following the Armistice of 22 June 1940, Monnet disagreed with de Gaulle's claim that he alone represented fighting France. He would have preferred that de Gaulle work with others who were supporters, at that time, of continuing the resistance, such as General Charles Noguès in North Africa. Also, Monnet thought that an organization centred in London would appear to the French as a movement under British protection and inspired by British interests. In a letter to de Gaulle on 23 June, Monnet said he had made these concerns known to British Foreign Office officials Alexander Cadogan and Robert Vansittart, as well as Churchill’s envoy Edward Spears. Monnet would later play a critical role in the consolidation of de Gaulle's position as France's leader, in Algiers in 1943.

As France was no longer allied with Britain, Monnet resigned as Chairman of the Anglo-French Coordinating Committee and wound up its operations. Churchill invited Monnet to continue his work securing supplies from North America with the British Purchasing Commission. In this role, he would ask for rapid and massive increases in the flow of American weapons, and he became known for arguing “Better ten thousand tanks too many than one tank too few."

Soon after his arrival in Washington, D.C., Monnet became an advisor to President Franklin D. Roosevelt. Convinced that America could serve as "the great arsenal of democracy", he persuaded the President to launch a massive arms production program, both as an economic stimulus and to supply the Allies with military resources. Unlike de Gaulle, Monnet was popular with the Americans and the English. A co-worker of his claimed that sometimes he would help Churchill to write a message to Roosevelt, and then subsequently help Roosevelt to compose the response. According to Edward R. Kantowicz, Monnet was impressed by the American organizational energy and saw cooperation with the new superpower as Europe's only chance to reorganize and recover itself. In 1941, Roosevelt, with Churchill's agreement, launched the Victory Program, which represented the involvement of the United States in the war effort. After the war, British economist John Maynard Keynes stated that Monnet, through his coordination work, had probably shortened World War II by a year.

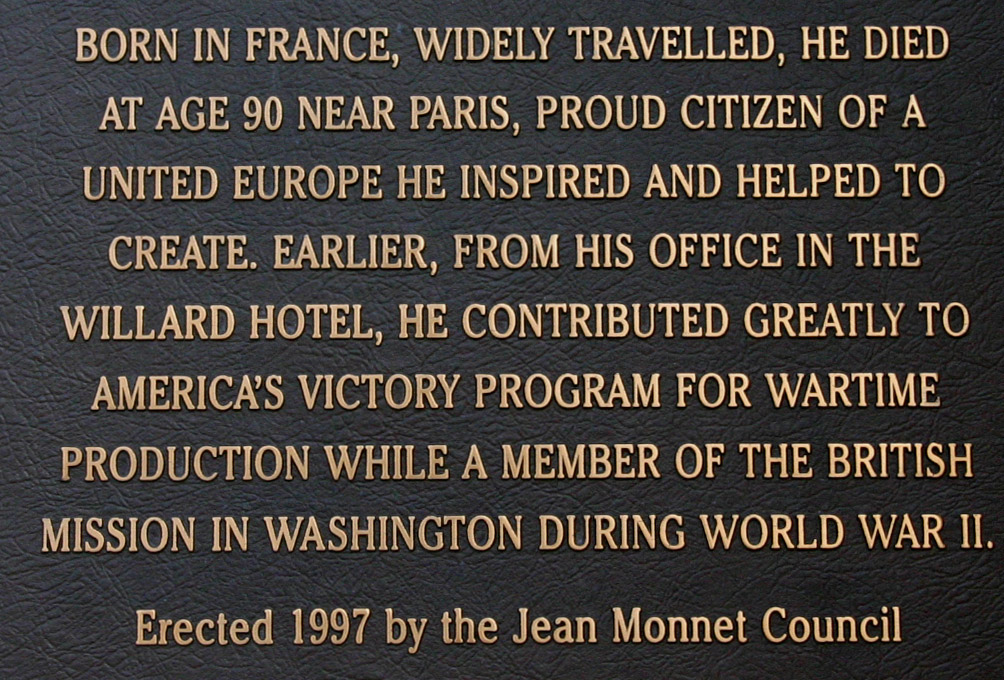
Memory plaque at the Willard Hotel where Monnet had his wartime office in Washington, D.C.

While in Washington, Monnet and his family lived in a comfortable house built in 1934 at 2415 Foxhall Road NW, which was later home to Adlai Stevenson III and James Baker. He worked from an office of the British Mission at the Willard Hotel.

On 5 June 1943, Monnet became one of the first seven members of the French Committee of National Liberation (French: Comité français de Libération nationale, CFLN), the French government-in-exile co-chaired by de Gaulle and Henri Giraud and stationed in Algiers, as Commissaire à l'Armement (Minister of Armaments). During a meeting on 5 August of that year, Monnet declared to the Committee:

"There will be no peace in Europe if the States are reconstituted on the basis of national sovereignty, with all that that entails in terms of prestige politics and economic protectionism. The countries of Europe are too small to guarantee their people the prosperity that modern conditions make possible and consequently necessary. Prosperity for the States of Europe and the social developments that must go with it will only be possible if they form a federation or a "European entity" that makes them into a common economic unit.”

== The Blum–Byrnes Agreement ==
In 1946, Monnet successfully negotiated the Blum–Byrnes agreement with the United States, which cleared France from a $2.8 billion debt (mostly World War I loans) and provided the country with an additional low-interest loan of $650 million. In return, France opened its cinemas to American movies.

== The Monnet Plan ==
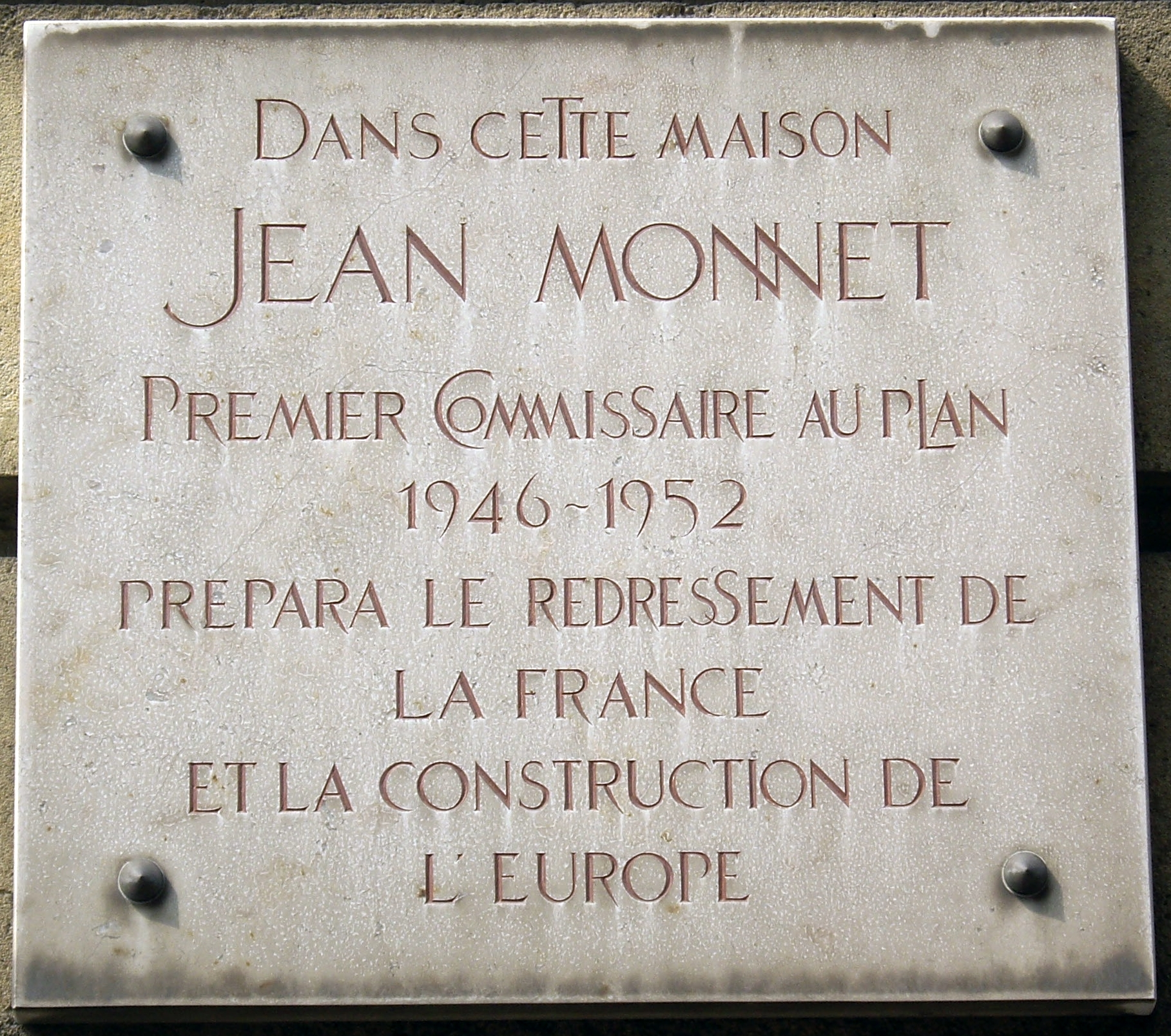
Plaque at 18, rue de Martignac, the office of the Plan

In 1946, faced with the challenge of reconstruction after WWII, France implemented the Modernization and Re-equipment Plan, which was designed to spur economic recovery. This plan is commonly known as the “Monnet Plan” after Jean Monnet, the chief advocate and first head of the General Planning Commission (Le Commissariat général du Plan).

The Monnet Plan emphasized expansion, modernization, efficiency, and modern management practice. Its process – focusing, prioritizing, and pointing the way – has been called “indicative planning” to differentiate it from highly directive and rigid Soviet-style planning.

The Plan’s initial objectives included exceeding France’s 1929 production level by 25% in 1950, which implied an ambitious 11% annual growth rate over five years. Although not all of the goals were met, the Plan has been credited with providing direction, vision, and hope to the nation, and it set France on the road to an economic miracle in the 1950s.

The Monnet Plan created the impetus for French foreign minister Robert Schuman’s proposal to pool the French and German markets for coal and steel. The resulting Schuman Declaration led to the creation of the European Coal and Steel Community, which laid the foundation for the 1958 establishment of the European Economic Community, the forerunner of the European Union (EU).

== European Coal and Steel Community ==
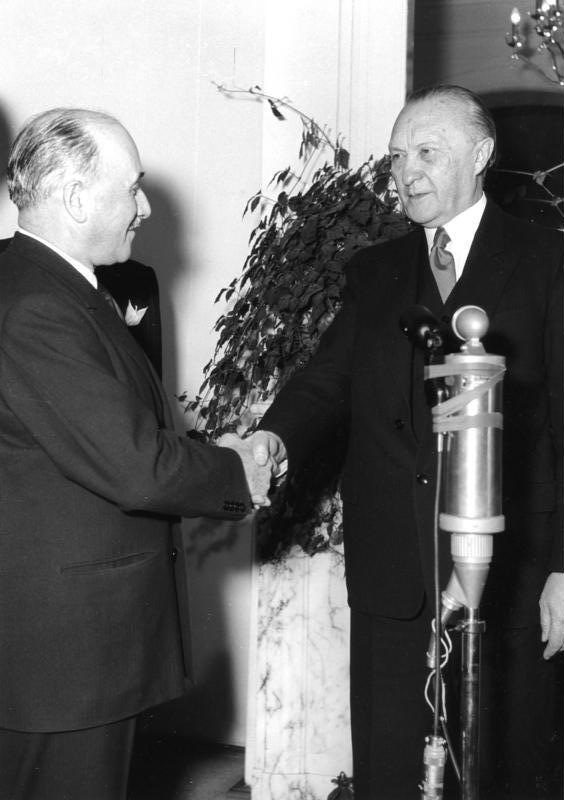
Monnet visiting Konrad Adenauer in Bonn, December 1953

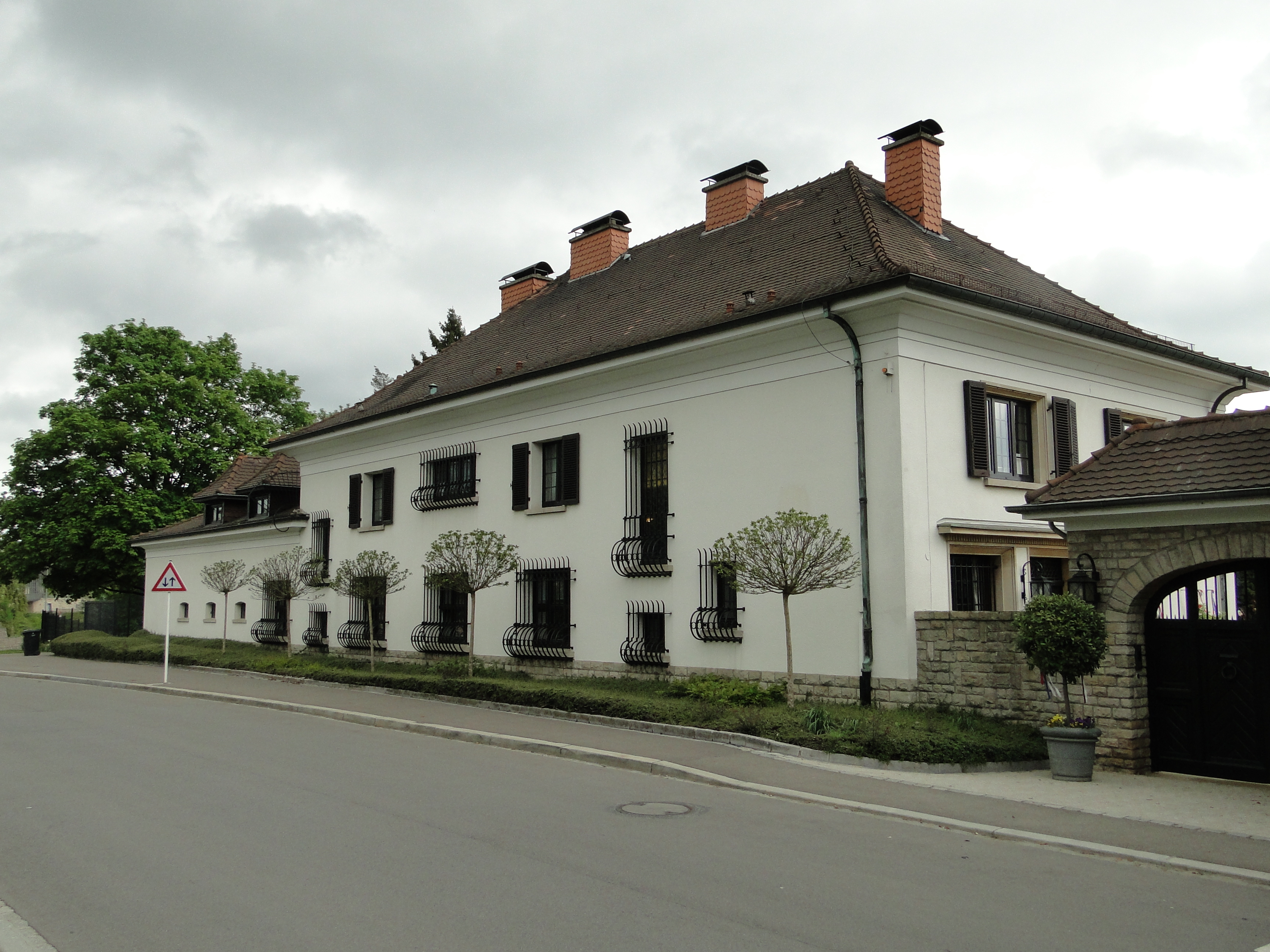
House at 138, rue des Muguets in Luxembourg, where Jean Monnet lived while heading the ECSC High Authority from 1953 to 1955

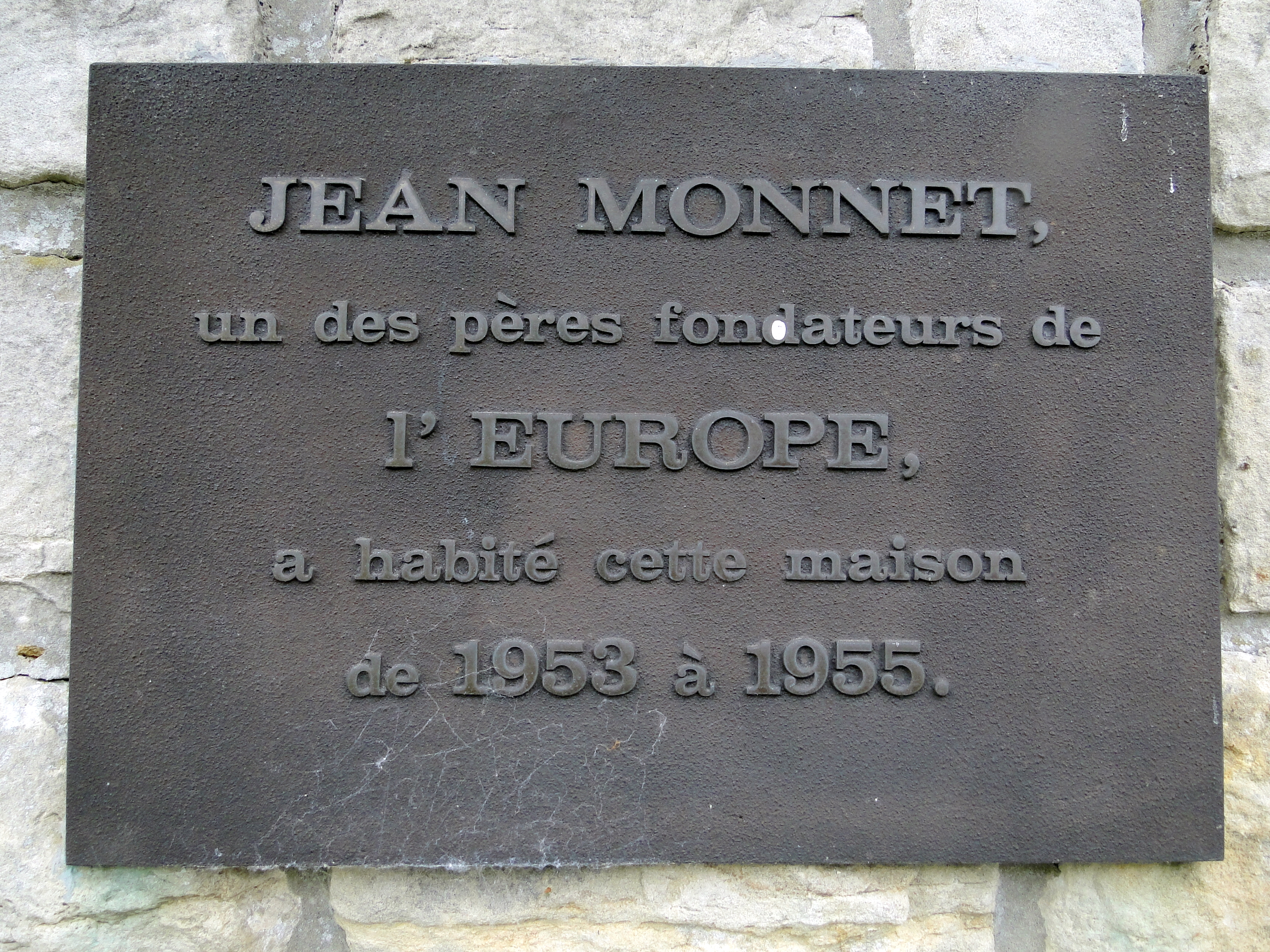
Plaque on the house at 138, rue des Muguets

Following World War II, when tensions between France and Germany rose over the control of the then vital coal and steel industries, Monnet proposed replacing the International Authority for the Ruhr with an agreement to pool French and German coal and steel industries. On 9 May 1950, with the agreement of Chancellor Konrad Adenauer of West Germany, the French Minister of Foreign Affairs Robert Schuman made a declaration in the name of the French government. This landmark pronouncement, prepared by Monnet for Schuman and known as the Schuman Declaration, proposed integration of the French and German coal and steel industries under the joint control of a High Authority, open to the other countries of Europe. Schuman declared:

"Through the consolidation of basic production and the institution of a new High Authority, whose decisions will bind France, Germany and the other countries that join, this proposal represents the first concrete step towards a European federation, imperative for the preservation of peace."

The date of the Schuman Declaration, 9 May, has been adopted as Europe Day by the EU. It is generally viewed as the starting point of the development of the Union and its institutions.

Negotiations on the Schuman Declaration led to the Treaty of Paris (1951), which established the European Coal and Steel Community (ECSC). France and West Germany signed the treaty, alongside Italy, Belgium, Luxembourg, and the Netherlands. In 1952, Jean Monnet became the first president of the ECSC's High Authority.

=== Luxembourg departure ===
"The Paris apartment which was to become the headquarters of the Action Committee for the United States of Europe was ready to receive the furniture from our house at Bricherhof on the outskirts of Luxembourg, already packed up. I remember coming home from a walk with Silvia one winter evening to find the house brightly lit and surrounded by cars. My colleagues on the High Authority were waiting for me with their retinue of advisers. At first, I thought it was an improvised farewell party; but they had an embarrassed air which puzzled me. Finally, Etzel pushed forward Michel Gaudet, who made the following statement:

'Monsieur le Président, your legal service has the duty to inform you that you cannot leave your post. We have gone through the Treaty over and over again, and it is clear that you remain President in office for as long as your successor has not been appointed.'

We halted our removal, and I stayed in Luxembourg for five more long months. Everyone had a reason for not hurrying to convene the Ministers of Foreign Affairs ..." (Memoirs, 1978)

== Action Committee for the United States of Europe ==
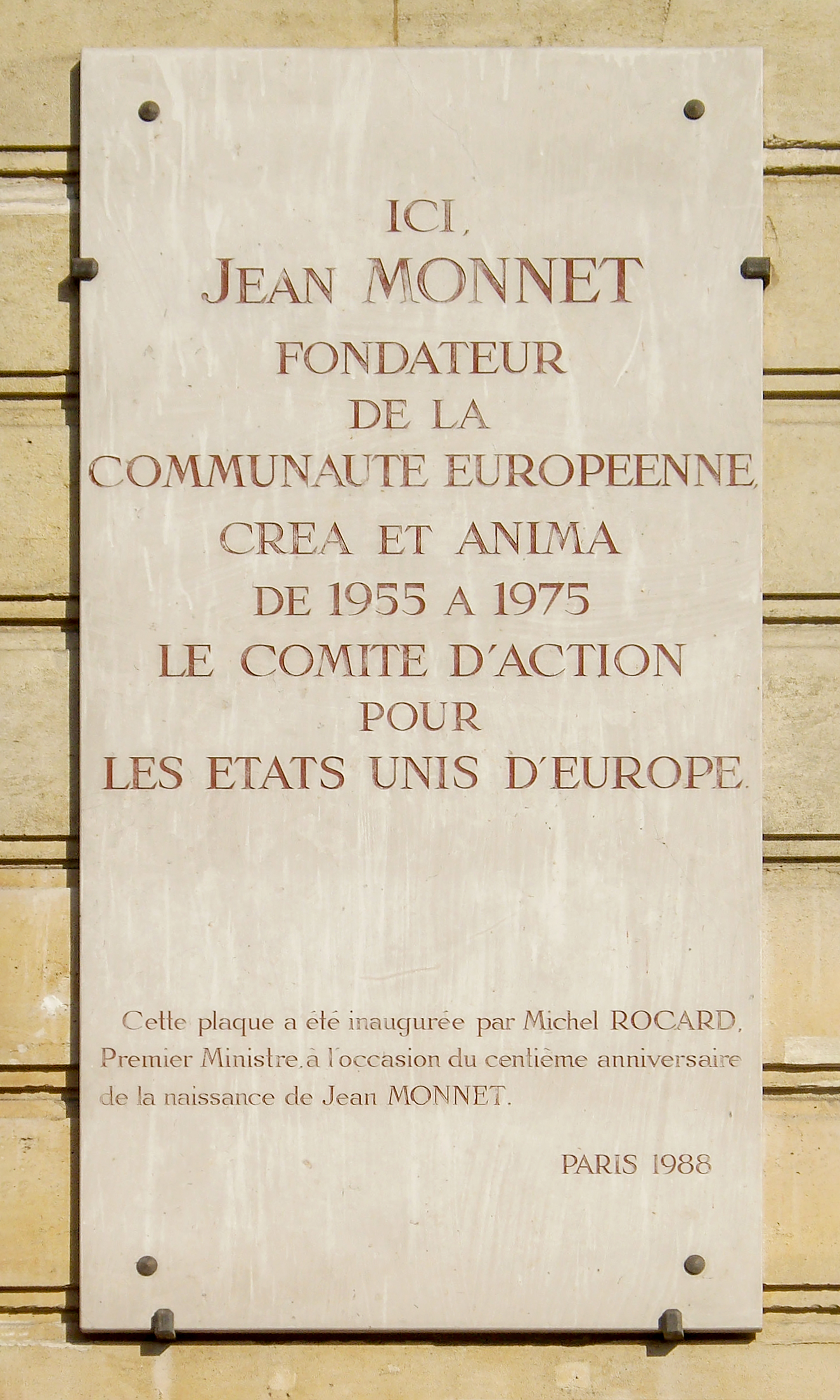
Plaque at 83, Avenue Foch in Paris, where the Action Committee had its secretariat

In 1955, Monnet founded the Action Committee for the United States of Europe in order to revive European construction following the failure of the European Defence Community (EDC). It brought political parties and European trade unions together to become a driving force behind the initiatives which laid the foundation for the European Union as it eventually emerged: first, the European Economic Community (EEC) (1958) (known commonly as the "Common Market"), which was established by the Treaty of Rome of 1957; later the European Communities (1967) with its corresponding bodies, the European Commission and the European Council of Ministers, British membership of the Communities (1973), the European Council (1974), the European Monetary System (1979), and a directly elected European Parliament (1979). This process reflected Monnet's belief in a gradualist approach to constructing European unity.

Monnet resigned and ended the Committee's activity on 9 May 1975, the 25th anniversary of the Schuman Declaration.

== Memoirs ==
Writing about his life and the principles which drove his action was a longstanding project which Monnet delayed for years, as he gave higher priority to his other projects. In the early 1970s, François Fontaine was instrumental in bringing the endeavour to fruition and drafted much of the text, even as Monnet retained ultimate control. The Memoirs were published by Fayard in 1976, and an English translation by Richard Mayne was published in 1978 by Doubleday.

== Private life ==
In August 1929, during a dinner party in Paris, the 41-year-old Monnet met 22-year-old Italian painter Silvia Giannini (17 August 1907 – 22 August 1982) who had recently married Francesco Giannini, an employee of Monnet when he was a representative in Italy. In April 1931, Silvia gave birth to a daughter, Anna, whose legal father was Giannini.

Since divorce was difficult or impossible to obtain in most European countries, Silvia and Jean Monnet met in Moscow; there, it was possible to obtain citizenship and residence qualifications rapidly, and to divorce and remarry at once. In 1934, he returned from China via the Trans-Siberian Railway, while she returned from Switzerland. He arranged for Silvia to obtain Soviet citizenship; she immediately divorced her husband and married Jean Monnet. The idea for the Moscow marriage came from Dr. Ludwik Rajchman, whom Monnet had met during his time at the League of Nations (Rajchman was connected to the Soviet Ambassador to China, Dmitrij Bogomołow). It seems that the American and French ambassadors in Moscow, William Bullitt and Charles Alphand, also played a role.

The custody of Anna was a problem: in 1935, Silvia took refuge with her daughter in the Soviet consulate in Shanghai, where they were living at the time because Francisco Giannini was trying to obtain custody of Anna. In 1937, the legal battle was decided in favour of Silvia in New York, but the ruling wasn't recognized by some other countries.

In 1941, Monnet and Silvia had another daughter, Marianne. The Monnet family returned to France in 1945 and, after the death of Francisco Giannini in 1974, the couple married canonically in the cathedral of Lourdes. Silvia Monnet was very important to her husband throughout their forty-five years of marriage; according to Louis Joxe, Monnet "would spend hours writing to his wife, whose opinion mattered more to him than that of anyone else".

== Death and burial ==
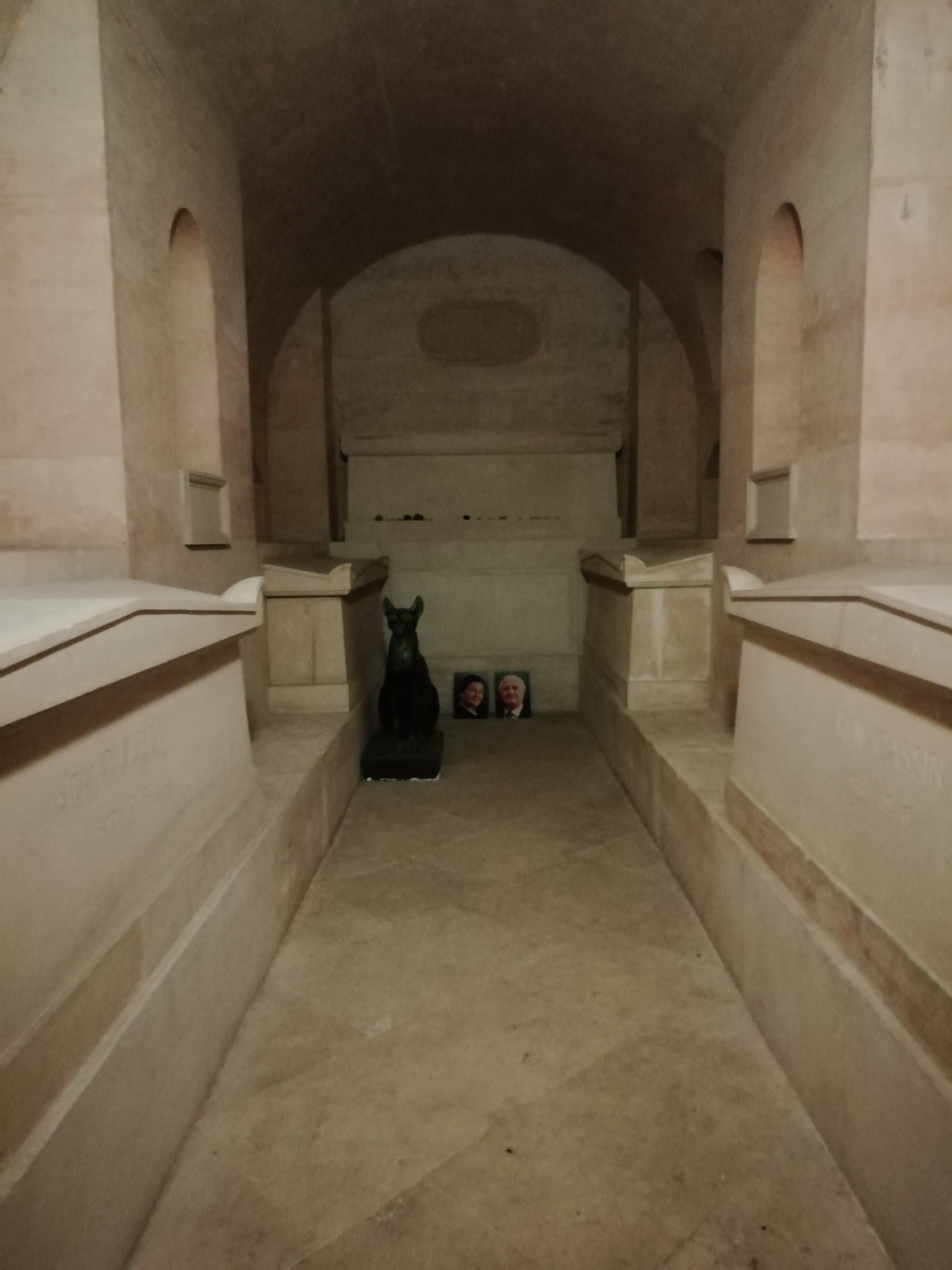
Jean Monnet's tomb in the Panthéon alongside Jean Moulin, André Malraux, Simone and Antoine Veil, and René Cassin

On 16 March 1979, Jean Monnet died at the age of 90 in his home in Houjarray, Bazoches-sur-Guyonne. His funeral took place in the church of Montfort-l'Amaury on 20 March 1979, with French President Valéry Giscard d'Estaing and German Chancellor Helmut Schmidt both present.

On 9 November 1988, on the hundredth anniversary of his birth, his ashes were transferred to the Panthéon in Paris in a ceremony attended by numerous European heads of state and governments.

== Honours ==
In 1953, Monnet was awarded the Karlspreis by the city of Aachen, Germany, in recognition of his achievements. He received numerous other prizes and honorary degrees, including Doctor Honoris Causa from the universities of Cambridge (8 June 1961), Dartmouth (11 June 1961), Yale (12 June 1961), and Oxford (26 June 1963). He was an elected member of both the American Academy of Arts and Sciences (1962) and the American Philosophical Society (1964).

On 6 December 1963, he was presented with the Presidential Medal of Freedom, with Special Distinction, by United States President Lyndon B. Johnson. The decision had been made by President Kennedy before his assassination.

In 1972, Queen Elizabeth II made him an honorary Member of the Order of the Companions of Honour.

On 2 April 1976, he was the first to be bestowed Honorary Citizen of Europe by the European Council of the EU, for extraordinary work to promote European cooperation: he remained the only one for a generation until Helmut Kohl received the same distinction in 1998. He also became the first person then living to be pictured on a Federal Republic of Germany stamp who was not a German head of state.

== Memorialization ==
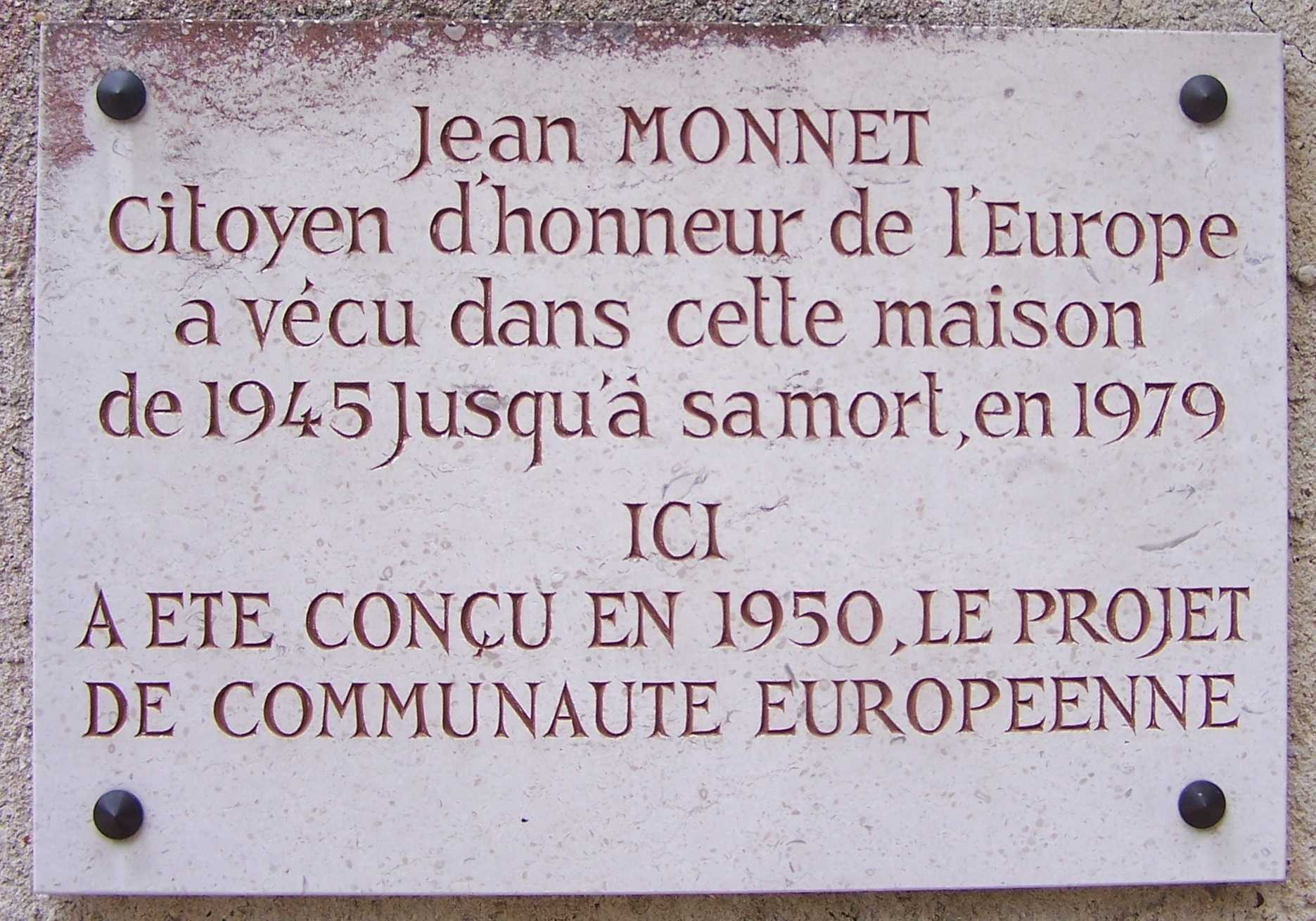
Plaque at Houjarray

=== Public monuments ===
Public memorials to Monnet include:

- Bronze busts in front of his birthplace in Cognac; at the entrance of the square Jean-Monnet in Montpellier; in Angers; inside the Peace Palace in The Hague; and as part of the Monument to the Founding Fathers of the European Union in King Michael I Park, Bucharest.
- A sculpted memorial in a garden named after Monnet, in Vanves near Paris.
- A life-size statue by Zurab Tsereteli, part of a group offered by Russia in 2012 and erected in front of the Robert Schuman House in Scy-Chazelles near Metz.
- Commemorative plaques on the Willard Hotel in Washington, D.C., where he worked during World War II; the building at 18, rue de Martignac, where he created France's General Planning Commission; the Hotel Grand Chef at Mondorf-les-Bains in Luxembourg, where he lived in 1952-1953; the house at 138, rue des Muguets in Luxembourg, where he lived in 1953-1955; the building on 83, avenue Foch in Paris, where his Action Committee for the United States of Europe had its office from 1955 to 1975; and the house at Houjarray where he lived after 1945 and died in 1979.
- In the United States, a bill was introduced in 2022 to erect a bench in memory of Monnet in Rock Creek Park, with support from the National Capital Memorial Advisory Commission and National Park Service.

=== Places ===
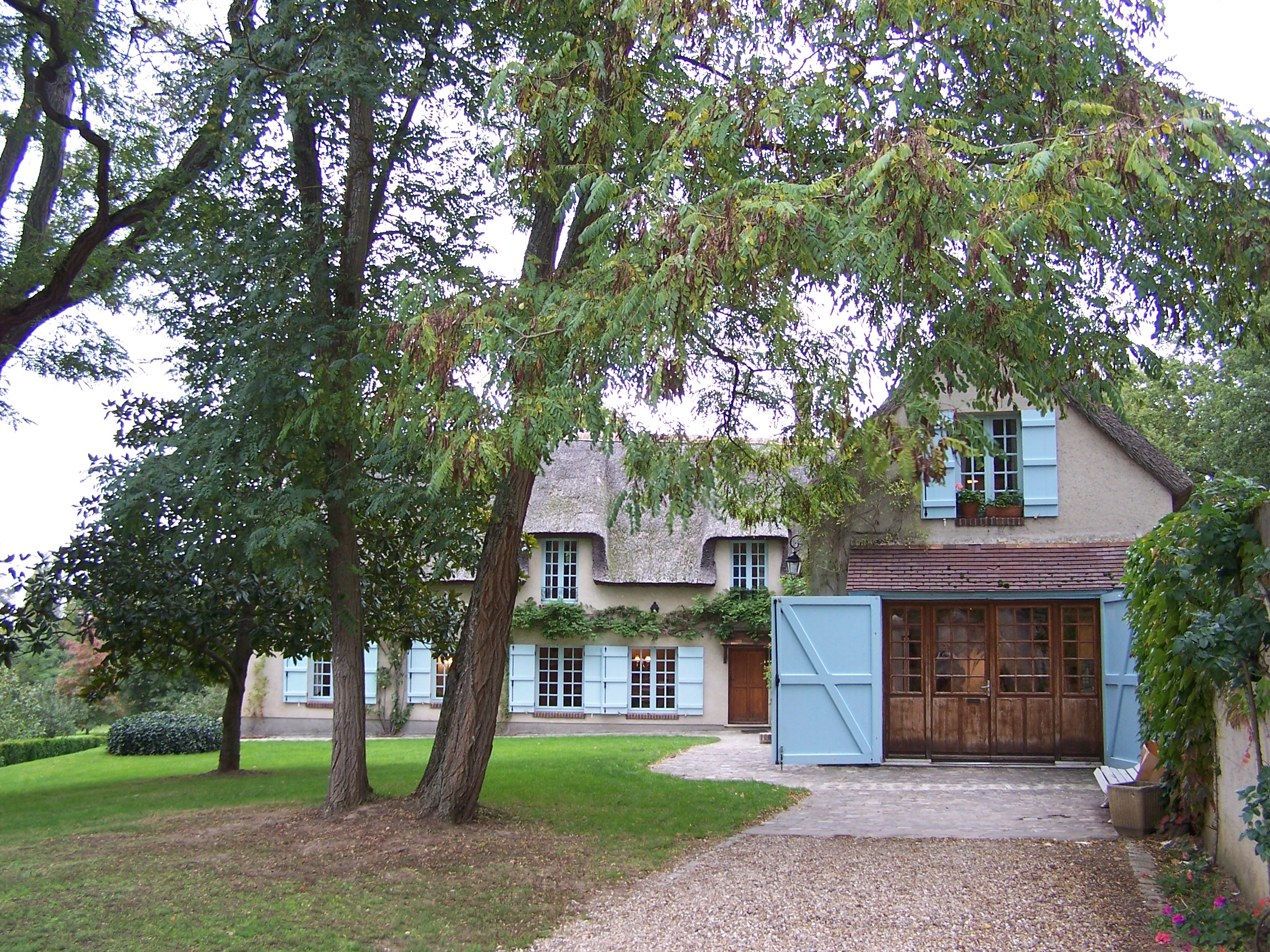
Jean Monnet House

==== Jean Monnet House at Houjarray ====
The Jean Monnet House is located in Houjarray, a hamlet of Bazoches-sur-Guyonne, Yvelines, 80 kilometres (50 miles) outside Paris. This old farm became Jean Monnet's property in 1945, upon his return to France. It was there that Jean Monnet and his advisors, in the last days of April 1950, drew up the historic declaration that Robert Schuman used to address Europe on 9 May 1950, proposing the creation of the European Coal and Steel Community.

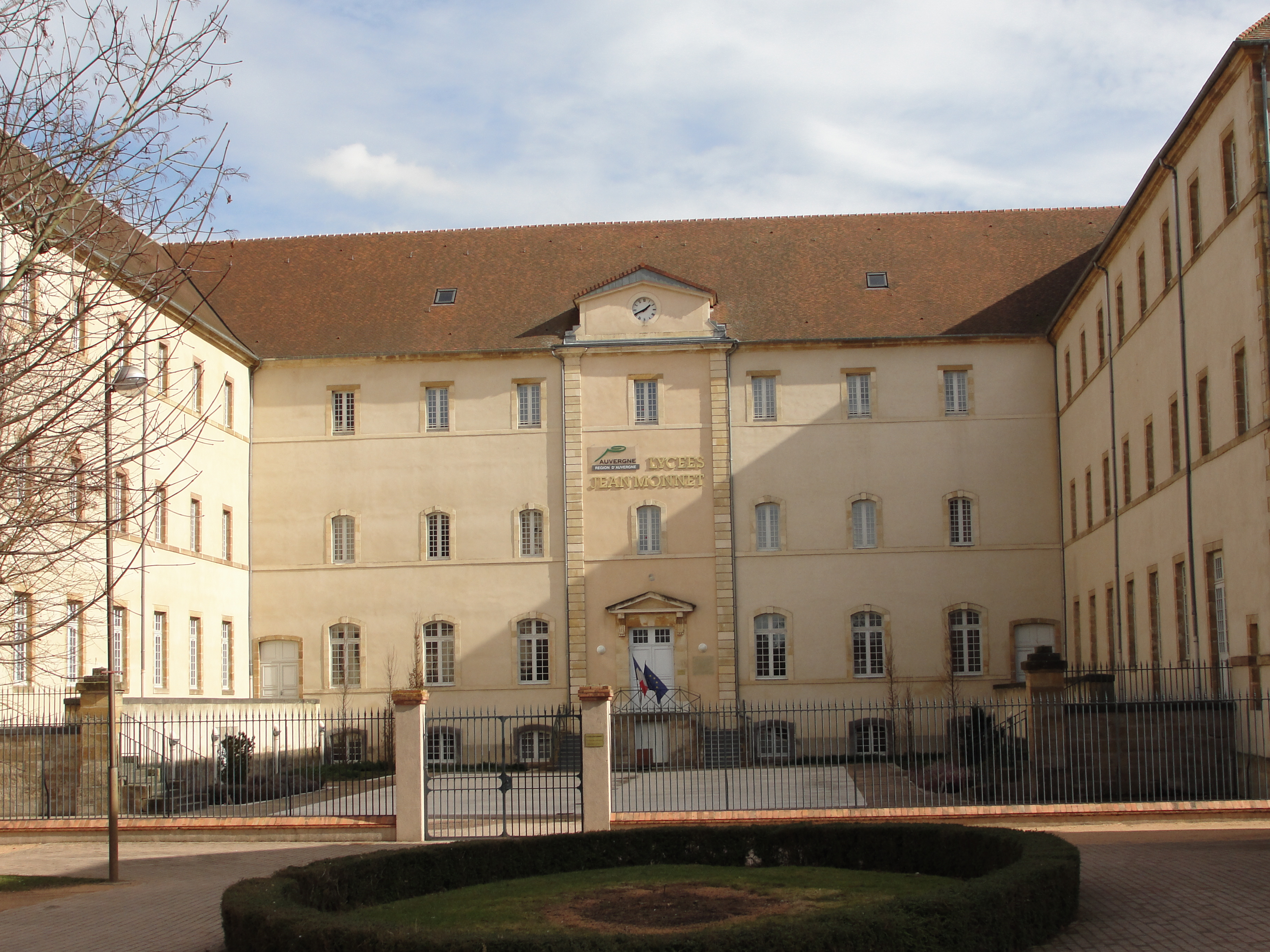
Lycée Jean-Monnet in Yzeure

In the house, Robert Schuman, Walter Hallstein, Paul-Henri Spaak, Konrad Adenauer, René Pleven, Helmut Schmidt, and many others exchanged their views with Jean Monnet on Europe's common future. On Sundays, he had friends passing by come to his house; among them were Dwight Eisenhower, George Ball, and Edward Heath. Monnet liked fireside conversations with journalists such as Walter Lippmann, Hubert Beuve-Méry, or his neighbour Pierre Viansson-Ponté. This house was also where Jean Monnet died on 16 March 1979. The European Parliament acquired the house in 1982 and erected a multimedia conference room in 2000.

==== Public spaces ====
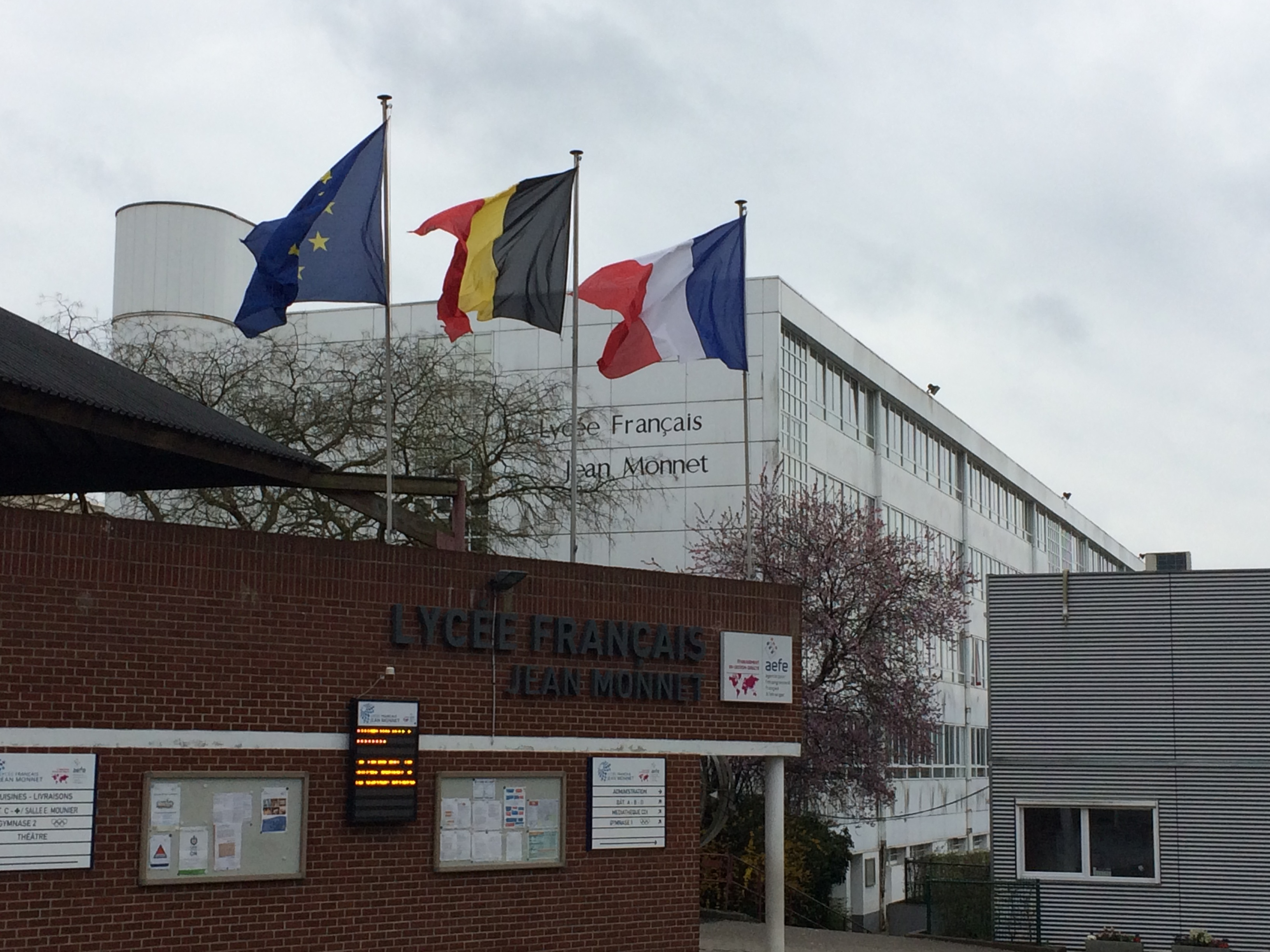
Lycée Français Jean-Monnet in Brussels

Numerous streets, squares, and avenues have been named after Jean Monnet in France and elsewhere in Europe. They include the Place Jean-Monnet in the 16th arrondissement of Paris, and the Jean-Monnet-Strasse in the Moabit neighbourhood of Berlin.

==== Educational institutions ====
Many educational institutions are named after Monnet, including numerous French Lycées and Jean Monnet University (Université Jean Monnet de Saint-Étienne), situated on two campuses in Saint-Étienne. Outside France, educational institutions named after Monnet include a high school in Taiwan, dedicated in 1985 to honour Monnet's contribution to the Republic of China and especially to the creation of the China Development Finance Corporation; and the Jean Monnet High School in Bucharest, Romania. The University of Limerick, Ireland, has a lecture theatre named after Monnet.

British educational institutions which honour Monnet include:

The Jean Monnet Centre of Excellence at King's College London, the East Midlands Euro-Centre at Loughborough University, the European Research Institute at the University of Bath, the Jean Monnet Centre at the University of Birmingham, the Jean Monnet European Centre of Excellence at Cambridge, the Jean Monnet European Centre of Excellence at the University of Essex, the Centre for European Union Studies at the University of Hull, the Kent Centre for Europe at the University of Kent, the Jean Monnet Centre of Excellence, a partnership between the University of Manchester, Manchester Metropolitan University and the University of Salford, the Jean Monnet Centre at Newcastle University, and the Jean Monnet Centre for European Studies at the University of Wales.

==== Other buildings ====
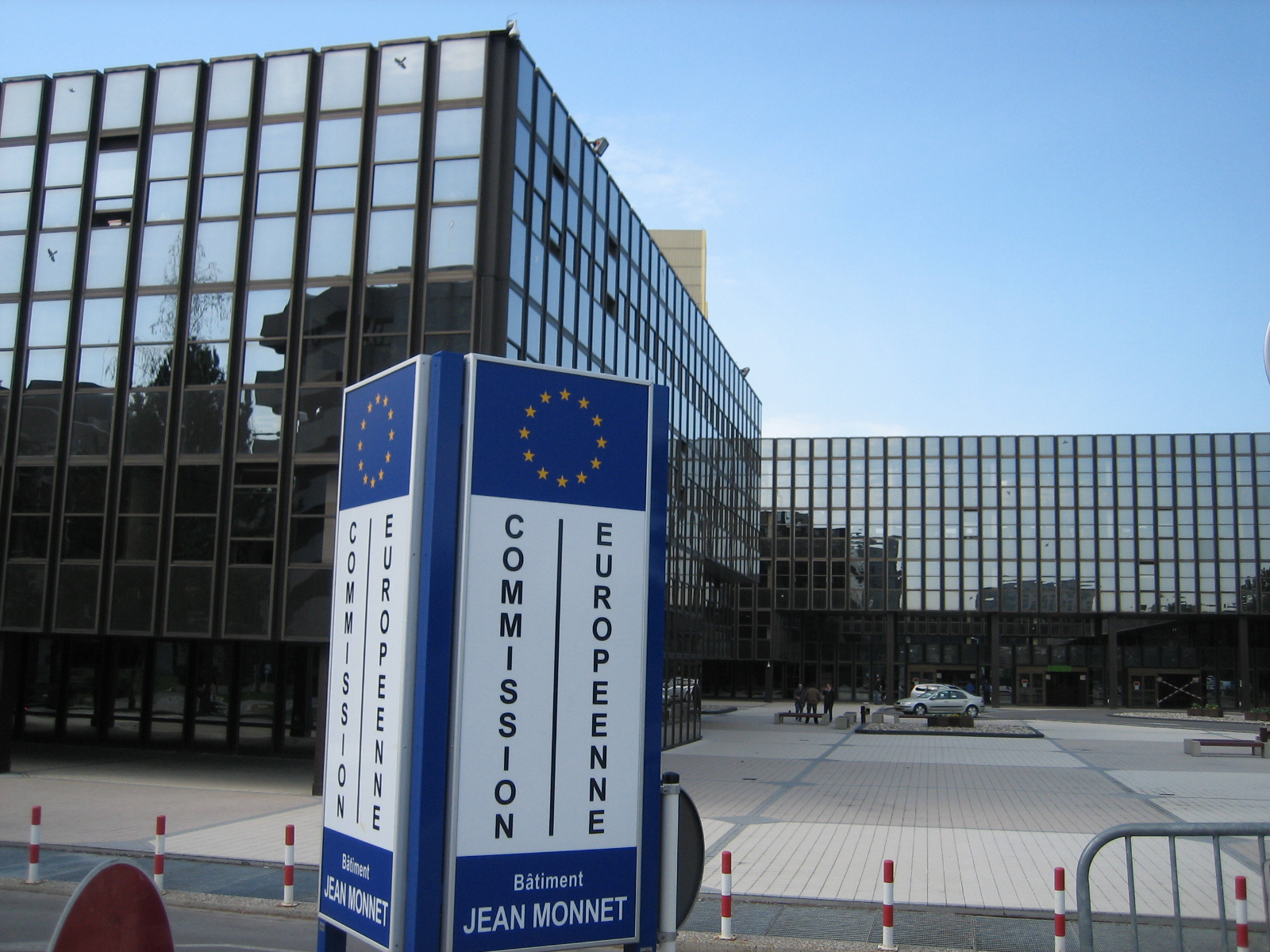
The now demolished first Jean Monnet building, in Luxembourg. Its replacement, the Jean Monnet 2 building, became operational in 2023

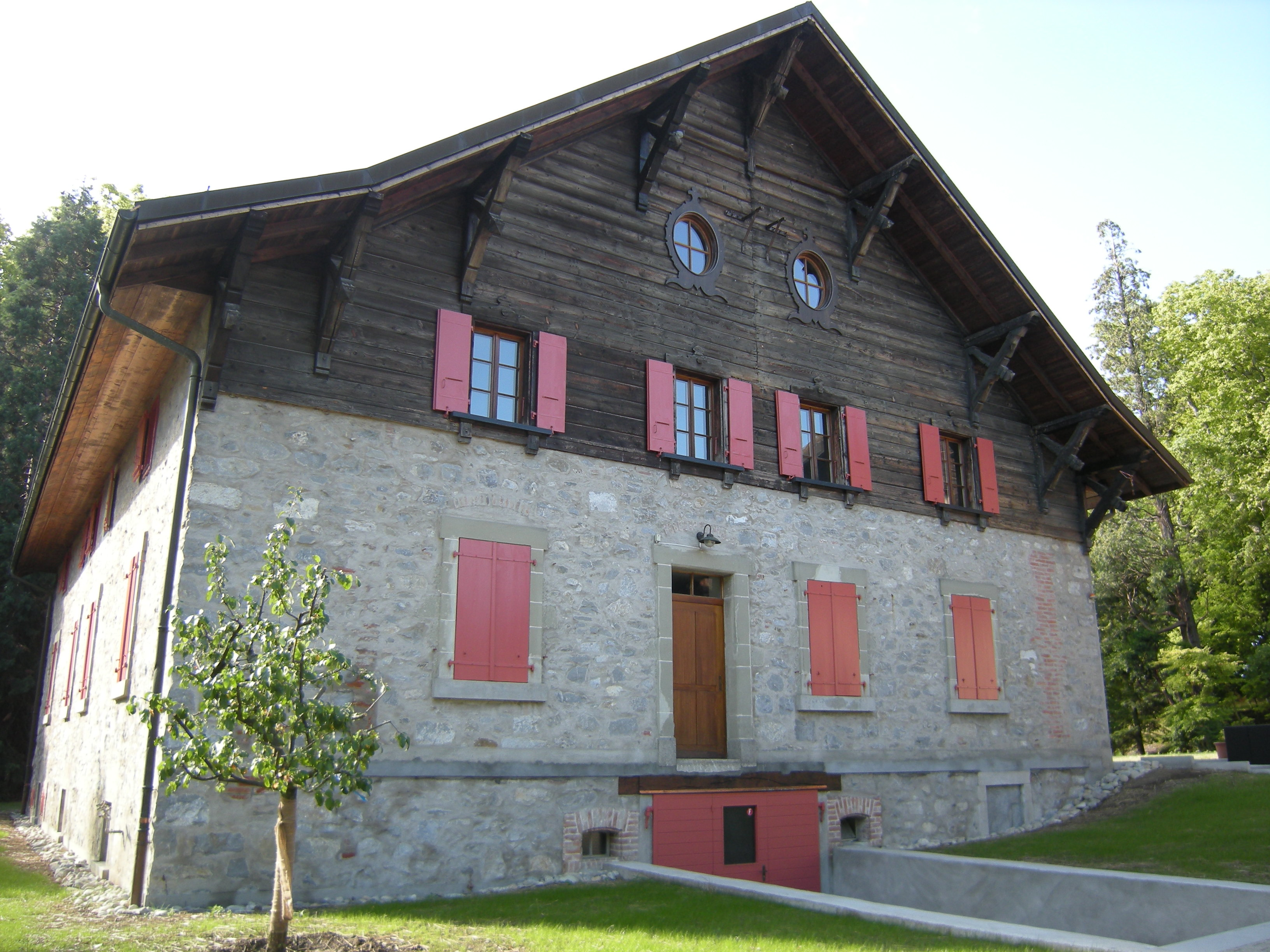
Jean Monnet Foundation for Europe in Lausanne

The Jean Monnet Building was the principal location of the European Commission's activities in Luxembourg between 1975 and 2016. Its replacement, the Jean Monnet 2 building, became operational from February 2023.

=== Organizations ===
==== Jean Monnet Foundation for Europe ====
The Jean Monnet Foundation for Europe in Lausanne supports initiatives dedicated to the construction of European unity. Its origins date from a meeting between Jean Monnet and Henri Rieben in 1955. It is located on the campus of the University of Lausanne and houses the personal archives of Jean Monnet as well as those of Robert Schuman, Robert Marjolin, François Fontaine, Jacques Van Helmont, Paolo Emilio Taviani, Robert Triffin, and the Earl of Perth.

==== Jean Monnet Association ====
The Jean Monnet Association, created in 1986 and initially chaired by Étienne Hirsch, is a French non-profit that organizes about 250 conferences on European history and current events each year.

==== Jean Monnet Council ====
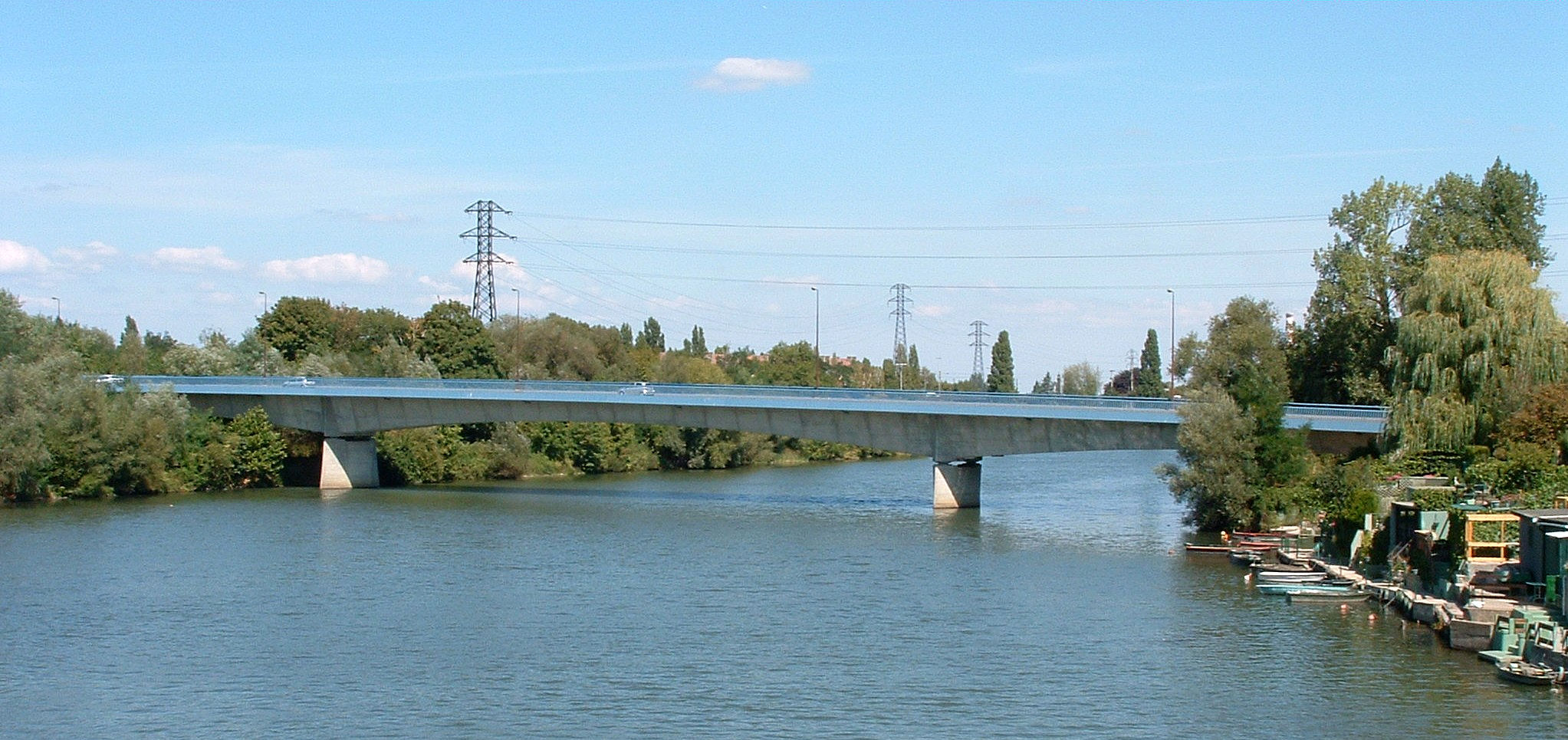
Jean-Monnet Bridge over the Moselle in Metz

The Jean Monnet Council was formed in the United States in 1988, on the centenary of Monnet's birth. It has published several volumes on Monnet, including Jean Monnet: The Path to European Unity (1991), Monnet and the Americans: The Father of a United Europe and His U.S. Supporters (1995), and The Father of Europe: The Life and Times of Jean Monnet (2018). In 1997, it erected a plaque on the Willard Hotel in memory of the office Monnet kept there during World War II.

==== Jean Monnet Institute ====
The Jean Monnet Institute is a French nonprofit, established in 2021 to leverage Monnet's legacy to foster European integration and chaired by Monnet's grandson Jean-Marc Lieberherr. One of its early initiatives was a new edition of Monnet's Memoirs, with a preface authored by French President Emmanuel Macron.

=== Prizes and scholarships ===
==== Jean Monnet prizes ====
The Jean Monnet Prize for European Literature, set up in 1995 by the department of Charente, rewards European authors for books written in, or translated to, French.

The Jean Monnet Prize for European Integration, given by EuropeanConstitution.eu, a French association, rewards projects contributing to the promotion of European integration.

Several universities and research centres award prizes named after Jean Monnet.

==== Jean Monnet Programme and Chairs ====
The European Union maintains Monnet's memory with the Jean Monnet Actions, under the Erasmus+ programme of the Education, Audiovisual and Culture Executive Agency (EACEA). This programme promotes knowledge on European integration and European studies on a worldwide scale, especially at the university level, through the Jean Monnet Centres of Excellence, as well as chairs, policy debates, and support to associations.

Jean Monnet Actions aim to build bridges between academics, researchers, and EU policymakers. There is an emphasis on the study of and research on EU integration, and in understanding Europe's place in a globalised world. Jean Monnet Actions are organised and applied for via higher education institutions.

Jean Monnet Chairs are teaching posts with a specialisation in EU studies for university professors or senior lecturers. Jean Monnet Chairs can:

- Enhance the teaching of EU studies at their own institution through the curriculum
- Conduct, monitor, and supervise research on EU matters at all education levels
- Be a mentor and advisor to the next generation of teachers and researchers
- Provide expert guidance to future professionals about European matters

Jean Monnet Chairs are encouraged to:

- Publish books within their university press during the grant period, with the grant covering part of the publication and, if need be, part of the translation costs
- Participate in dissemination and information events in their own country and around Europe
- Organise events (lectures, seminars, workshops, etc.) with policymakers, civil society, and schools
- Network with other academics and institutions supported by Jean Monnet
- Apply open educational resources and publish the summaries, content, schedule, and expected outcomes of activities

Jean Monnet chairs have been established, for example, at the following universities (alphabetically):

- Universität Augsburg (Christoph Vedder)
- Freie Universität Berlin (Tanja A. Börzel)
- Ruhr-Universität Bochum (Sebastian Bersick)
- Universität Bremen (Ulrike Liebert)
- Technische Universität Chemnitz (Matthias Niedobitek)
- Universität Duisburg-Essen (Michael Kaeding und Ansgar Belke)
- Viadrina European University (Matthias Pechstein)
- Justus-Liebig-Universität Gießen (Mahulena Hofmann)
- Universität Hamburg (Gabriele Clemens)
- Ruprecht-Karls-Universität Heidelberg (Peter-Christian Müller-Graf)
- Universität Hildesheim (Michael Gehler)
- Friedrich-Schiller-Universität Jena (Matthias Ruffert)
- Hochschule für Öffentliche Verwaltung Kehl (Annegret Eppler)
- Universität Konstanz (Daniel Thym)
- Deutsche Sporthochschule Köln (Jürgen Mittag)
- Universität zu Köln (Wolfgang Wessels)
- Otto-von-Guericke-Universität Magdeburg (Wolfgang Renzsch)
- Johannes-Gutenberg-Universität Mainz (Arne Niemann)
- Faculty of Organisation Studies in Novo mesto (Uroš Pinterič)
- University of Oldenburg (Martin Heidenreich)
- Universität Osnabrück (Jean Monnet Centre of Excellence in European Studies)
- Universität Paderborn (Dieter Krimphove)
- Universität Passau (Daniel Göler)
- Universität Regensburg (Rainer Arnold)
- Eberhard Karls Universität Tübingen (Rudolf Hrbek und Gabriele Abels)
- Universität des Saarlandes (Thomas Giegerich)
- Universiteit Utrecht (Sybe A. de Vries)
- Universität Wuppertal (Hans J. Lietzmann)
- Julius-Maximilians-Universität Würzburg (Gisela Müller-Brandeck-Bocquet)

=== Other dedications ===
Shortly after his death, Monnet was chosen as patron of the 1980–1981 academic year at the College of Europe. On the centenary of his birth in 1988, he was similarly chosen as class patron by the students who entered École nationale d'administration that year and graduated in 1990.

=== Cinema ===
In April 2011, to commemorate the 60th anniversary of the signing of the Treaty of Paris, a new documentary, Jean Monnet: Father of Europe, was produced. The documentary includes interviews with colleagues of Monnet such as Georges Berthoin, Max Kohnstamm, and Jacques-René Rabier, as well as former member of the European Court of Justice David A.O. Edward of the United Kingdom.

== See also ==
- History of the European Union
- Money doctor

== Bibliography ==
- Anta, Claudio Giulio. "The Europe of Jean Monnet: the road to functionalism." History of European Ideas 47.5 (2021): 773-784.
- Brinkley, Douglas (1991). Jean Monnet: The Path to European Unity. Palgrave Macmillan UK. ISBN 978-1-349-12249-3.
- Duchêne, François (1994). Jean Monnet: The First Statesman of Interdependence. Norton. ISBN 978-0-393-03497-4.
- Featherstone, Kevin. "Jean Monnet and the democratic deficit in the European Union." Journal of Common Market Studies 32 (1994): 149+.
- Fransen, Frederic J. (2001). The Supranational Politics of Jean Monnet: Ideas and Origins of the European Community. Greenwood Publishing Group. ISBN 978-0-313-31829-0.
- Frapporti, Mattia. "The European logistics space: On Jean Monnet and the integration of Europe." Notas Económicas 49 (2019): 35-46. online
- Monnet, Jean (1978). Memoirs. Translated by Richard Mayne. Garden City, New York: Doubleday & Company, Inc. ISBN 0-385-12505-4. online
- Pūras, Adomas. "A shape-shifting creature dissected: political representations of Jean Monnet in European studies." Baltic journal of political science 4 (2015): 110-126; historiography; [Pūras, Adomas. "A shape-shifting creature dissected: political representations of Jean Monnet in European studies." Baltic journal of political science 4 (2015): 110-126. online]
- Rostow, Walt W. "Jean Monnet: The innovator as diplomat." in The Diplomats, 1939-1979 (Princeton University Press, 2019) pp. 257–288. online
- Jean Monnet: Father of Europe, 2011, archived from the original on 18 October 2015, "documentary by Don C. Smith, Denver, Colorado"
- Troitiño, David Ramiro. "Jean Monnet before the first European Community: a historical perspective and critic." Trames 21.3 (2017): 193-213. online
- Ugland, Trygve. Jean Monnet and Canada: early travels and the idea of European unity (U of Toronto Press, 2011).
- Wells. Sherrill Brown (2011). Jean Monnet: Unconventional Statesman. Lynne Rienner Publishers. ISBN 978-1-58826-787-0.
- Jean Lacouture (1990). The rebel 1890-1944; translated from the French by Patrick O'Brian. v.2 The ruler 1945-1970; translated from the French by Alan Sheridan (in French). Norton. ISBN 978-0-393-02699-3.
- Katrin Rücker; Laurent Warlouzet (18 January 2009). Quelle(s) Europe(s)?: Nouvelles Approches en Histoire de L'Intégration Européenne [Which Europe(s)? New Approaches in European Integration History] (in French). Peter Lang. ISBN 978-90-5201-484-5.
- Monnet, Jean (1988). Mémoires (in French). Fayard. ISBN 978-2-213-65802-5.
- Sylvain Schirmann (2008). Robert Schuman et les pères de l'Europe: cultures politiques et années de formation (in French). Peter Lang. ISBN 978-90-5201-423-4.
