= Lista del molibdeno =

Italian war material request during WWII

The Lista del molibdeno (lit. 'Molybdenum list') was a list of requests for raw materials and military equipment which Benito Mussolini sent to Adolf Hitler's Germany as condition for Italy's entry into World War II.

The list is named after Bernardo Attolico's—Italy's-then ambassador in Berlin—comment, as the amount of molybdenum requested was larger than the entire world's production, making it clear the list was a pretext to avoid joining World War II. The list was drawn up during a meeting held at Palazzo Venezia, Rome, on 26 August 1939 by Mussolini and Italy's military staff. It was sent to Attolico on the same date, who presented it to Joachim von Ribbentrop, Germany's-then Minister for Foreign Affairs.

== History ==
The diplomatic situation in Europe had worsened in August 1939, making an imminent outbreak of a new war more likely. Various European nations had already signed non-aggression pacts and mutual-assistance pacts between them, one of the most recent being the Pact of Steel (22 May 1939) between Italy and Germany. On 12 August of the same year, Italy's Minister for Foreign Affairs Galeazzo Ciano went to the Berghof, Hitler's residence in Bavaria, for a meeting with the Führer. Hitler talked about the possibility of an armed conflict restricted to only Germany and Poland if Warsaw refused Berlin's proposals, adding that "Poland's provocations and the exacerbation of the situation had made Germany's action urgent".

The Pact of Steel's clauses required Italy to go to war together with Germany if the latter attacked Poland, but Mussolini was aware that Italy's economic and military situation, following the 1935–1937 war in Ethiopia and Italy's aid to Francisco Franco in the Spanish Civil War, did not allow any further large-scale military operations, and he communicated this to Hitler. On 25 August, the German chancellor asked the Duce what military equipment and raw materials Italy required. On the following morning, Mussolini called an urgent meeting at his official residence, Palazzo Venezia, between himself and Italy's military staff to decide what would be requested from Berlin. The generals present at the meeting received from Galeazzo Ciano the recommendation, with Mussolini's tacit consent, of exaggerating Italy's requests and of not applying any "criminal optimism".

On the afternoon of 26 August, Mussolini replied to Hitler with a very long and intentionally exaggerated list, impossible to satisfy. The list, named "Lista del molibdeno" (lit. 'Molybdenum list') for the 600 tons of molybdenum required, was drawn up without any semblance of seriousness and contained a total of 17 millions of tons of material and specified that Italy could not sustain the war effort without such resources. Mussolini himself added 600 pieces of anti-aircraft artillery to discourage the Germans from accepting Italy's requests.

Italy's ambassador in Berlin, Bernardo Attolico, received the list from Rome and sent it to Joachim von Ribbentrop so he could pass it on to Hitler. Ribbentrop, upon reading it, asked Attolico about when Italy expected to receive such a large amount of material. The question troubled Attolico, who, without any instruction from Rome, replied "immediately."

Hitler, despite suspecting Mussolini was deceiving him, appeared sympathetic and said that he recognised Italy's precarious situation and that he could send only a small portion of the requested resources, but it was impossible to him to satisfy entirely Rome's requests. The Reichskanzler asked Italy to keep France and the United Kingdom thinking they were going to join the war through propaganda and troop movement and to send manpower to Germany.

== Contents of the List ==
Below, an excerpt from the letter of requests sent by Mussolini on 26 August 1939:

«Führer, this morning I gathered the Chiefs of Staff of the Army, Navy and Air Force, with Minister Ciano and Minister of Communications present, and here is the minimum that the Italian Armed Forces need to sustain a twelve-month war in addition to what we have:

- coal for gas and steel industry 6,000,000 t
- steel 2,000,000 t
- oil 7,000,000 t
- wood 1,000,000 t
- copper 150,000 t
- sodium nitrate 220,000 t
- potassium salts 70,000 t
- rosin 25,000 t
- rubber 22,000 t
- toluene 18,000 t
- essence of turpentine 6,000 t
- lead 10,000 t
- tin 7,000 t
- nickel 5,000 t
- molybdenum 600 t
- tungsten 600 t
- zirconium 20 t
- titanium 400 t

Without the certainty of these supplies, I have the duty to tell You that the sacrifices to which I would call the Italian people - sure of being obeyed - could be in vain and would compromise Your cause along with mine. [...] If you believe that there is still any possibility of a solution on the political terrain, I am ready to give You - as on other occasions - my full solidarity and to take the initiatives that you may deem useful for this purpose».

== Bibliography ==
- Bocca, Giorgio (1996). Storia d'Italia nella guerra fascista 1940−1943 [History of Italy in the fascist war] (in Italian). Milan: Mondadori. ISBN 88-04-41214-3.
- Bauer, Eddy (2015). Controstoria della seconda guerra mondiale, Vol. 1. Milan: Res Gestae. ISBN 978-88-6697-109-2.
- Baumont, Maurice (1973). Le origini della Seconda guerra mondiale. Milano: Mursia.
- Ciano, Galeazzo (1948). L'Europa verso la catastrofe. La politica estera dell'Italia fascista 1936-1942. Verona: Mondadori.
- Di Nolfio, Ennio (2008). Storia delle relazioni internazionali: Dal 1918 ai giorni nostri. Bari: Editori Laterza. ISBN 97-88-85811730-9.
- Kershaw, Ian (2012). Scelte fatali. Trebaseleghe: Bompiani. ISBN 9788845269882.
- Paoletti, Ciro (2014). Dalla non belligeranza alla guerra parallela. Rome: Commissione Italiana di Storia Militare.
- Schäfer, Emil Philipp (1967). Calchi Novati, Giampaolo (ed.). Prima dell'apocalisse: Gli ultimi tredici giorni di pace [Before the Apocalypse: The Last Thirteen Days of Peace] (in Italian). Translated by Molinari Mina, Maria Lena. Turin: Ugo Mursia Editore.
- Mack Smith, Denis (1993). Le guerre del Duce. Cles: Arnoldo Mondadori Editore. ISBN 88-04-43229-2.
- Watt, Donald Cameron (1989). 1939. Leonardo Edizioni. ISBN 88-35-50019-2.
