= Allied Maritime Transport Council =

The Allied Maritime Transport Council (AMTC) was an international agency created during World War I to coordinate shipping between the allied powers of France, Italy, Great Britain, and the United States. The council (based in London) was formed at a conference in Paris on 3 November 1917, in response to the resumption of unrestricted submarine warfare earlier that year. The United States formally joined the AMTC only on October 1, 1918. The Transport Council existed until March 1919, when it was merged with the Supreme Economic Council. Its executive committees were disbanded.

== Prelude ==
In January 1917 the Inter-Allied Shipping Committee was established with representatives from Great Britain, France, and Italy. However this body was ineffective lacking ministerial input for policy development or suitable officials to organise either shipping or supplies. Russia was not involved – shipping issues as regards this country being followed in a different basis. By the time the AMTC was established the Russian Revolution had occurred, and therefore Russia was not involved. However with the American entry into World War I on 2 April 1917 and increasing problems in handling supplies particularly in France and Italy made re-organisation essential.

The system of control was based on that previously developed in the British Empire. Originally Italy had adopted a similar system by Royal Decree in 1915, where by ships were requisitioned for a period of time at a fixed rate of hire to carry Government cargoes. The owner was responsible for recruiting and paying the crew, with the Government paying the running expenses and managing the vessel. This was altered in January 1916 for a system whereby the ship owners were paid per tonnage delivered. However with 90% of the supplies consisting of cereals and coal this very soon led to shortages in both these areas and so the government returned to the requisitioning system.

France had a more varied range of imports and did not face serious shortages until later. Some ships were requisitioned on a bare-boat basis – where the Government recruited and supplied the crew, a somewhat inefficient charter system with much trade continuing on a pre-war basis. However the British Time-charter requisitioning method was gradually introduced and the Minister of Commerce was exercising full control over French supplies by the time the AMTC was established.

The USA introduced a requisitioning system in 1917, however paying increased costs. With the requirements which arose from shipping the Army to Europe, quite drastic steps were taken to organise control. Restrictions on imports were more exercised by policy decisions than control of shipping. In general the US did not face shortages, however public appeals were made for citizens to voluntarily reduce consumption so that goods could be sent to Europe. For example an appeal issued by the newly founded United States Food Administration for the public to eat more maize bread was successful, and more wheat could be exported to their European allies. Also the War Purchase and Finance Board was established with an American chairman. This met in Paris and London to arrange the allocation of credits for American purchases.

== Structure ==
=== The Council ===
Each nation appointed its respective ministers (or delegates) in charge of shipping to the council. The representatives were:

- Robert Cecil and Sir Joseph Maclay for Great Britain;
- Étienne Clémentel and Louis Loucheur for France;
- Silvio Crespi and Salvatore Orlando, the latter replaced by Giovanni Villa in May 1918 for Italy;
- Raymond B. Stevens and George Rublee (from July 1918) for the United States

The Council held six meetings:

- First Meeting of the Council, 11–14 March, 1918
- Second Meeting of the Council, Paris, 23–25 April, 1918
- Third Meeting of the Council, 29–30 August, 1918
- Fourth Meeting of the Council, 30 September, 1918
- Fifth Meeting of the Council, 1 February, 1919
- Sixth Meeting of the Council, 10 March, 1919

=== The Committees ===
==== Main Executive Committee ====
The AMTC had a Main Executive Committee chaired by James Arthur Salter alongside Jean Monnet, (France), Bernardo Attolico (Italy) with the later addition of George Rublee.

Salter and Monnet called their business in the AMTC ‘international administration’. In more critical terms the Transport Council worked like a cartel, just run by states, trying to eliminate the economic and logistic competition between the partners. So the organization tried to hold prices down, pooled the allied tonnage and coordinated the allied logistics with substantial rationalization effects.

Their work was supported by three subcommittees, each responsible for reporting to the main committee

==== Tonnage Sub-Committee ====
The Tonnage Sub-Committee was responsible for implementing any decisions of the council concerning the co-operative use or programming of tonnage. It also gathered information about the amount and disposition of the tonnage under the control of each Ally and examined any proposals made by them as regards any improvements made by them in this area as well as doing their best to see that any agreed improvements were carried out.

- M. Revillon (France).
- Lieut. Farina (Italy).
- Mr. Shearman (U.S.A.).
- Mr. Browett (Great Britain).

==== Imports Sub-Committee ====
- M. Halgouet (France).
- Bernardo Attolico (Italy)
- Dwight Morrow (U.S.A.).

==== Statistical Sub-Committee ====
- M. Seitert (France).
- Signor Pardo (Italy).
- Mr. J. A. Field (U.S.A.).
- William Palin Elderton (Great Britain).

== See also ==
- Wheat Executive

== Bibliography ==
- James Arthur Salter: Allied Shipping Control, Oxford:Clarendon Press 1921.
- Jean Monnet: Memoirs, London 1978.
- Marc McClure, "Earnest Endeavors: The Life and Public Work of George Rublee", Greenwood 2003.
