= Edmund Wyldbore-Smith =

British civil servant, diplomat, and businessman

Sir Edmund Charles Wyldbore-Smith (15 January 1877 – 18 October 1938) was a British civil servant, diplomat, and businessman.

== Biography ==
Smith, whose father and grandfather were Anglican clergymen, was the great-grandson of the second Smith-Marriott Baronet, Sir John Wyldbore Smith.

In 1901, he married Evadne Maude Kellet; and the couple had two daughters.

=== Career ===
In the early 1900s, Wyldbore-Smith served in the Foreign Office beginning his service as Vice-Consul at Tangiers in 1903. Four years later he was appointed Vice-Consul in Canea (modern Chania), Crete. In January 1910 he transferred to the Board of Trade where he was employed as Officer-in-Charge of Commercial Enquiries in its recently established Exhibitions Branch; in effect he acted as deputy to the Director of the Branch, Ulick Fitzgerald Wintour. During the First World War, Smith was Director of the British Executive Staff of the Commission Internationale de Ravitaillement, which was the international commission for the purchase of supplies for the Allies.

Wyldbore-Smith resignation from the Civil Service in 1919 opened the way for a career in business. He was appointed chairman of Thomas Cook (both the travel agency and the banking firm), succeeding Frank Cook, who was the grandson of the company's founder.

Wyldbore-Smith served as vice-president of the Compagnie Internationale des Wagons-Lits (International Sleeping-Car Company) and vice-president of the Federation of British Industries. He also served as a director of the Suez Canal Company.

== Honours ==
In 1906, he was elected to the Royal Statistical Society.

Smith was awarded decorations of seven countries, including:

- Knight Bachelor (United Kingdom)
- Légion d'Honneur (France)
- Order of Leopold (Belgium)
- Order of the Crown of Italy, 1918 (Italy).
- Order of George I, 1920 (Greece).
- Order of the Sacred Treasure, 1920 (Japan).
- Order of the Crown of Romania, 1921.
