= Marie-Louise Monnet =

- Born: September 25, 1902
- Died: November 2, 1988 (aged 86); Tours
- Notable work: Founder of French Catholic Action

Marie-Louise Monnet (25 September 1902-2 November 1988) was the founder of the French branch of Catholic Action, and the first woman appointed auditor at the Second Vatican Council.

She is the sister of Jean Monnet, a founding father of the European Union.

Regarding the influence of Monnet on the Second Vatican Council, Mannion wrote that "it is beyond question that the Decree on the Lay Apostolate, itself, received considerable input from Marie-Louise Monnet."

Regina Heyder recounted the beginning of Monnet's time as Vatican auditor:

On 24 September 1964, Marie-Louise Monnet and Rosemary Goldie were the first women auditors to join the weekly assembly of what had been until then a male-only group of lay auditors. The next day, Monnet was the first woman participant to arrive in the counciliar aula. Both Monnet and Goldie had been present in Rome from the opening of the council to follow its proceedings... Monnet as a leader of MIAMSI, the Mouvement International d'Apostolat des Milieux Sociaux Independants... The examples of Goldie and Monnet reveal that women were involved in conciliar politics even before they received the official invitation to serve as lay auditors.

As the lay auditors had no right to speak or to vote in the council's general congregations, their main activities might be described generally as networking. The laywomen attended the regular meetings of the lay auditors, where on only three occasions a religious sister was present. The women formed a Groupe de travail des auditrices (Working Group of Women Auditors) to intensify the collaboration between religious sisters and laywomen and to study together the council's texts concerning women especially. From these activities there emerged comments on the drafts of Apostolicam Actuositatem, Gravissimum Educationis, and Gaudium et Spes (Schema XIII)....

Marie-Louise Monnet was the focus of a conference held at the Bishops' House in Paris (Maison des évêques à Paris), on 20 January 2017, entitled "Marie-Louise Monnet, a visionary of the place of the laity at the heart of Church", which included presentations by Micheline Poujoulat, Father Paul Destable, and Elisabeth Croquison.

== Works ==
Publications by Marie-Louise Monnet include:

- Monnet, Marie-Louise (1989). Avec amour et passion: 50 ans de la vie de l Église à travers une vocation de femme [With love and passion: 50 years of the life of the Church through a woman's vocation] (in French). Chambray-lès-Tours: CLD. ISBN 9782854431773. OCLC 25463004
- Monnet, Marie-Louise; Glorieux, Achille; Galichon, Alain; Donze, Henri (1968). L'apostolat des laïcs: Decret "Apostolicam Actuositatem" : texte conciliaire, introduction, commentaires [The apostolate of the laity: Decree "Apostolicam Actuositatem": conciliar text, introduction, comments] (in French). Tours: Maison Mame. OCLC 923809341
- Monnet, Marie-Louise; Glorieux, Achille; Galichon, Alain (1966). L'apostolat des laïcs: Décret "Apostolicam Actuositatem": texte conciliaire [The apostolate of the laity: Decree "Apostolicam Actuositatem": conciliar text] (in French). Paris: Mame. OCLC 793105640
  - Concilio Vaticano; Monnet, Marie-Louise; Glorieux, Achille (1967). Decreto sobre el apostolado de los laicos [Decree on the apostolate of the laity] (in Spanish). Bilbao: Mensajero. OCLC 851278993 (translation of L'apostolat des laics)
  - Monnet, Marie-Louise (1967). Mongillo, Dalmazio (ed.). L'apostolato dei laici: Decreto Apostolicam actuositatem [The apostolate of the laity: Decree Apostolicam Actuositatem] (in Italian). Brescia: Queriniana. OCLC 799538129
