= Louis Carré (art dealer) =

French art dealer (1897–1977)

- Born: Louis Carré; 17 December 1897; Vitré, Ille-et-Vilaine, France
- Died: 9 November 1977 (aged 79); Paris, France
- Occupation: Art dealer
- Spouse: Olga Carré

Louis Carré (French pronunciation: [lwi kaʁe]; 17 December 1897 – 11 September 1977) was a French art dealer. He is well known for having commissioned the building of the Maison Louis Carré by Alvar Aalto, which is the only remaining building by Aalto in France.
