= Wheat Executive =

Inter-allied organisation

The Wheat Executive was an inter-allied organisation established at a conference held in Paris on 15-16 November 1916 with representatives from the French, British and Italian governments to assess their aggregated requirements for wheat and flour, and how those needs might best be met.

The conference was attended by Étienne Clémentel, Minister of Commerce representing the French government, Giovanni Raineri representing the Italian government of Paolo Boselli and Walter Runciman, President of the Board of Trade representing the Asquith coalition ministry.

== Background ==
Despite bumper crops of wheat globally in 1914 and 1915, the global crop in 1916 fell from 3.36 billion bushels to 2.57 billion. Also faced with the ongoing impact of submarine warfare the Asquith coalition government set up the Royal Commission on Wheat Supplies (RCWS) in October 1916. Following this conference, representatives from France and Italy would come to London to form the Wheat Executive with the RCWS.

Bernardo Attolico was the Italian representative on the executive.

== See also ==
- Allied Maritime Transport Council
- Commission Internationale de Ravitaillement
