= Bernardo Attolico =

Italian diplomat

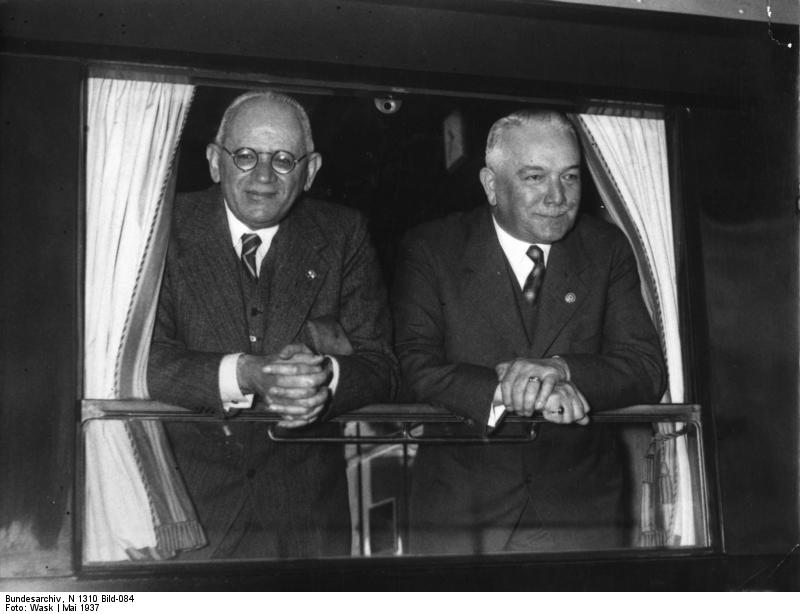
- Attolico with Konstantin von Neurath in 1937

Italian Ambassador to the Holy See
- In office 1940–1942

Italian Ambassador to Germany
- In office 1935–1940
- Succeeded by: Dino Alfieri

Italian Ambassador to the Soviet Union
- In office 1930–1935

Italian Ambassador to Brazil
- In office 1928–1930

League of Nations High Commissioner of Danzig
- In office 1920
- Preceded by: Edward Lisle Strutt
- Succeeded by: Richard Haking

Personal details
- Born: 17 January 1880 Canneto di Bari
- Died: 9 February 1942 (aged 62) Rome
- Occupation: Diplomat

Bernardo Attolico (17 January 1880 – 9 February 1942) was an Italian diplomat.

In 1915 he was appointed to represent the Italian Ministry of Agriculture, Industry and Commerce at the Commission Internationale de Ravitaillement in London. In 1916 he represented Italy in the Wheat Executive, and later the War Purchases and Finance Council and the executive committee of the Allied Maritime Transport Council and the Food Council Executive. In 1919 he participated in the peace negotiations in Paris. He served as the High Commissioner of the League of Nations at Danzig (1920–1921), Italian ambassador to Brazil (1928–1930), to the Soviet Union (1930–1935), to Nazi Germany (1935–1940) as well as ambassador to the Holy See (Vatican City) in Rome (1940–1942).

== See also ==
- Economic and Financial Organization of the League of Nations
