= Commission Internationale de Ravitaillement =

World War I Allied body for coordinating purchases of food and equipment

The Commission Internationale de Ravitaillement (CIR; English: International Commission for the Purchase of Supplies) was an institution created by two Allies of World War I, Britain and France, in August 1914, in response to shortages of wheat caused by the war. Later, other Allies joined the CIR. It did not have purchasing powers, but served as a coordinating body for the purchase of food supplies, munitions, and military and naval equipment. Sir Edmund Wyldbore-Smith, of the Board of Trade, headed the body through most of its existence, and afterwards led the British Executive Staff.

== History ==
The CIR was created at a meeting held on 13 August 1914 by the French and British Governments, in response to shortages of wheat caused by the war. The French government was represented by delegates of the Ministers of Finance, War and Marine, and the British by representatives of the British Foreign Office, Treasury, Admiralty, War Office, and Board of Trade.

It was created as an informal nonbinding institution, intended to coordinate the purchase of wheat supplies, initially headed by Ulick Wintour of the Board of Trade, but in October 1914, Wintour was replaced by Sir Edmund Wyldbore-Smith. According to Liberal Party MP Walter Runciman in February 1915, its official aims were "to co-ordinate the purchase of food supplies, munitions of war, and military and naval equipment by the two governments; to prevent harmful competition in the same markets and a consequent inflation of prices; to place the French Government in communication with firms who are capable of carrying out orders satisfactorily and at a reasonable price, and to spread the orders in such a way as to distribute employment, and thus accelerate delivery". The scope of the Commission was later extended to purchases made on behalf of the other Allied governments: The Belgian, Rumanian, Serbian, Japanese, Italian, Portuguese, Russian, Greek, and Brazilian Governments were invited to appoint delegates, and representative of the United States military authorities also became associated with the commission.

Articles intended for the use of an Allied government were not always purchased by the delegates on the Commission. If the export of such articles was prohibited by Proclamation, application for permission to export them had to be made to the Commission before the order was placed; however, permission to export was only withheld if the British Government considered that the export of the articles would cause detriment to the supplies of the Allied governments as a whole. Applications for permission to export goods for ordinary industrial purposes did not come within the scope of the CIR, but were the province of the War Trade Department.

As the seriousness of the war became obvious by late 1914 and supply encountered more difficulties in 1915, the Allies looked at alternative solutions, leading to the formation of a new body, the Joint Committee. This body did not improve things much overall, but did create a basis for the later creation of the Wheat Executive in November 1916.

The United States entered the war in April 1917, by which time the CIR was of significant size, with 350 British members and around 2,000 Allied members.

The British Committee on Commercial and Industrial Policy After the War published a report in 1918 suggesting that the British Government, in consultation with the allied powers, should consider the expediency of establishing a joint organisation based on the model of the CIR. The British Executive Staff then consisted of around 400 civil servants and temporary assistants, among these military officers and businessmen, and was headed by Wyldbore-Smith. The report stated, regarding the functioning of such a body: "All requests from private firms for permission to manufacture and export goods required for the execution of Allied government contracts have to be endorsed by the delegates on the commission of the Allied government concerned on verification by them of the official destination of the goods. They are then carefully examined by the British Executive Staff, in consultation with the competent British department, and if the price is considered exorbitant, the suppliers unsatisfactory, or the order likely to interfere unduly with contracts of greater importance, the transaction is prevented by withholding permission to manufacture".
