= Bazoches-sur-Guyonne =

- Commune
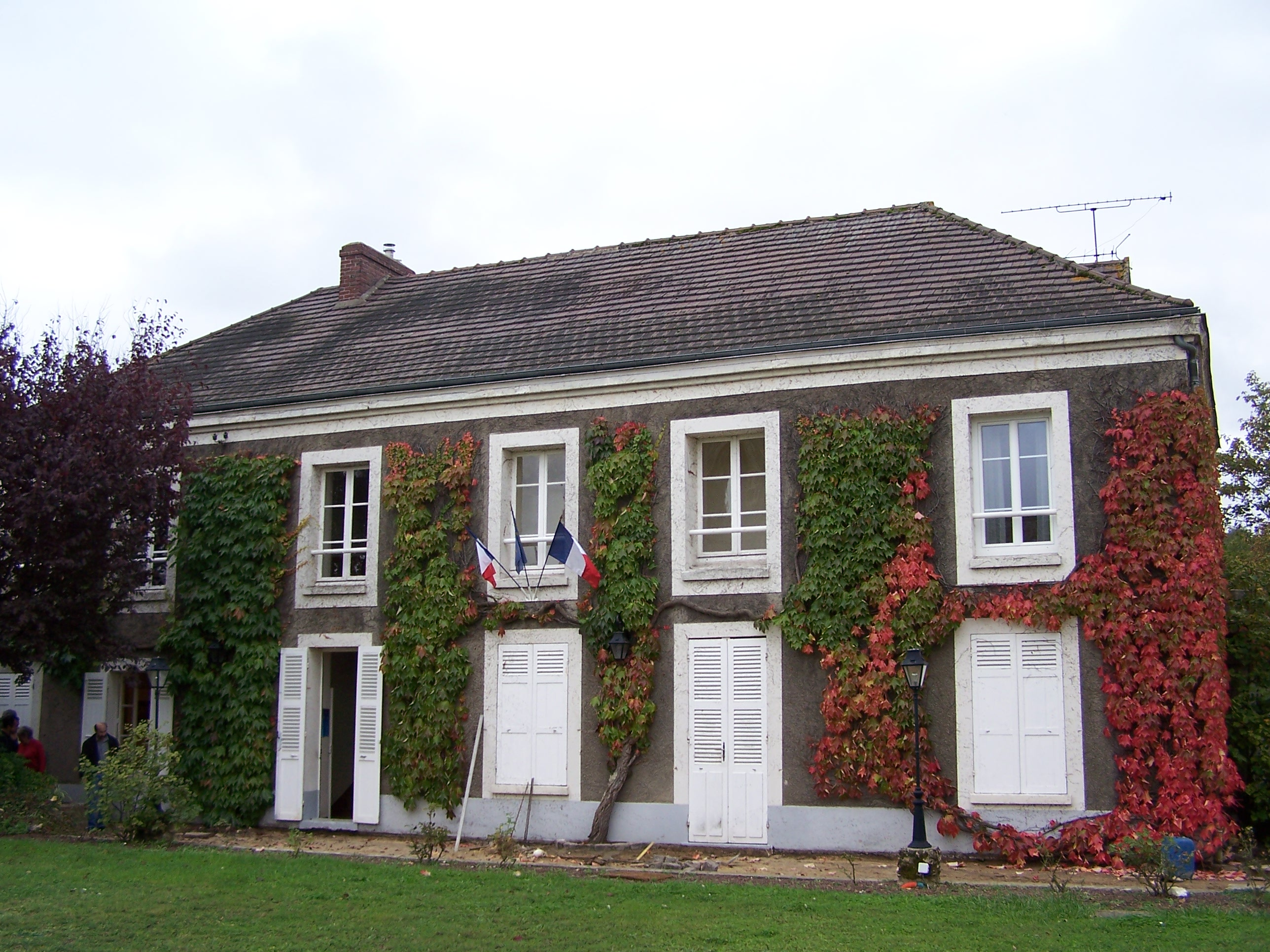
- Town hall
- Location of Bazoches-sur-Guyonne
- Location within France Location within Île-de-France (region)
- Coordinates: 48°46′45″N 1°51′41″E
- Country: France
- Region: Île-de-France
- Department: Yvelines
- Arrondissement: Rambouillet
- Canton: Aubergenville

Government
  - Mayor (2020–2026): Dominique Nicco
- Area^{1}: 5.66 km^{2} (2.19 sq mi)
- Elevation: 100 m (330 ft)
- Highest elevation: 175 m (574 ft)
- Lowest elevation: 81 m (266 ft)
- Population (2023): 721
  - Density: 127/km^{2} (330/sq mi)
- Time zone: UTC+01:00 (CET)
  - Summer (DST): UTC+02:00 (CEST)
- INSEE/Postal code: 78050 /78490
- ^{1} French Land Register data, which excludes lakes, ponds, glaciers > 1 km^{2} (0.386 sq mi or 247 acres) and river estuaries.

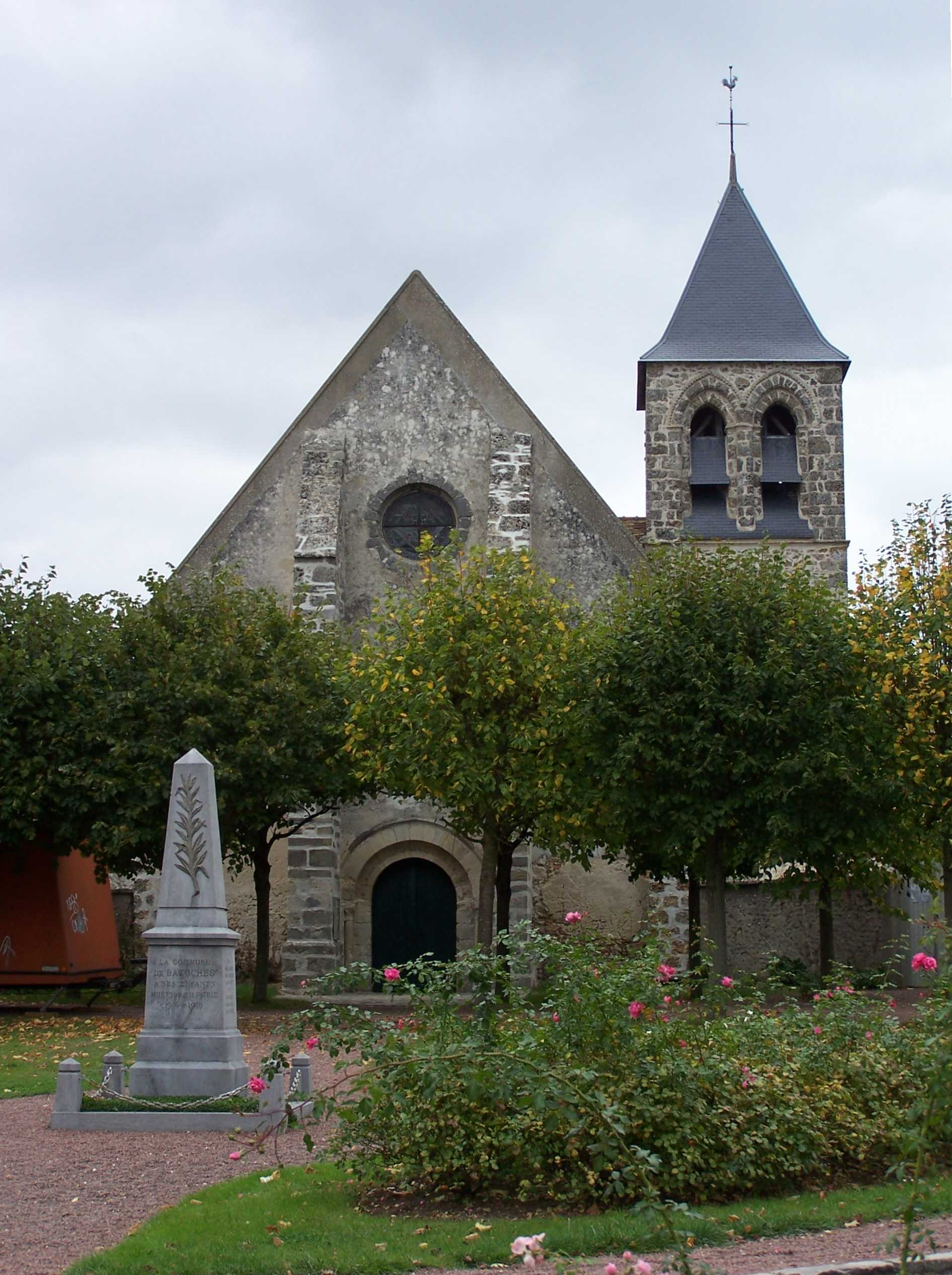
Saint-Martin

Bazoches-sur-Guyonne (French pronunciation: [bazɔʃ syʁ ɡɥijɔn]) is a commune in the Yvelines department in north-central France.

== See also ==
- Communes of the Yvelines department

Media related to Bazoches-sur-Guyonne at Wikimedia Commons
