= Peace economics =

Branch of conflict economics

Peace economics is a branch of conflict economics and focuses on the design of the sociosphere's political, economic, and cultural institutions and their interacting policies and actions with the goal of preventing, mitigating, or resolving violent conflict within and between societies. This violent conflict could be of any type and could involve either latent or actual violence. Recognizing the cost of violence, peace economics focuses on the benefits of (re)constructing societies with a view toward achieving irreversible, stable peace. Along with approaches drawn from other areas of scholarship, peace economics forms part of peace science, an evolving part of peace and conflict studies.

Despite overlaps, peace economics is distinct from war, military, defense, and security economics, all of which are branches of conflict economics. A key difference between peace economics and these related fields is that peace economics emphasizes the study of the presence of or conditions for peace, as distinct from studying the absence or presence of conflict, violence, war, or insecurity.

History of economic theories of peace

Peace economics has also been defined as "the use of economics to understand the causes and effects of violent conflict in the international system and the ways that conflict can be avoided, managed, or resolved." This restricts the subject matter to the international realm and leaves out the study of peace itself. Walter Isard, who is recognized as a pioneer in peace economics and the father of regional science in economics, defines peace economics as "generally concerned with: (1) resolution, management or reduction of conflict in the economic sphere, or among behaving units in their economic activity; (2) the use of economic measures and policy to cope with and control conflicts whether economic or not; and (3) the impact of conflict on the economic behavior and welfare of firms, consumers organizations, government and society." The notion of violence is absent and peace itself is not studied, but the level of analysis can be other than conflict between states. In a context restricted to international trade, another author writes that "Peace economics studies ways to eradicate and control conflict as well as to assess conflict's impact on society." The notion of violence is not explicit and the benefits of peace are seen only inasmuch as a reduction of conflict may improve opportunities for expanded global trade. Others make a distinction between "productive" and "unproductive" or "appropriative" economic activities their starting point of analysis in peace economics.

Economics Nobelist Jan Tinbergen defines peace economics as "economic science used for [a purpose that] prohibits [war] as an instrument of settling conflicts between nations and [to organize] the world in a way that warfare is punished". Violence is addressed only at the level of sovereigns, not dealing with civil war or debilitating organized or individual-level criminal violence. In related work, Tinbergen writes about a world order that would inhibit violence and permit peace between and among states. In his view, this requires a "world government", a sentiment not now commonly agreed among economists.

== History of economic theories of peace ==
A number of peace economists are explicit about the use of particular explanatory schema to be applied in peace economics, e.g., rational choice theory. In contrast, the main definition of peace economics is open to a variety of approaches. Virtually all authors acknowledge that peace economics is part of both positive economics and normative economics. While for most contemporary economists, work in positive economics may lead them to lay out a descriptive array or evaluation of policy choices from which one that is most valued is recommended to or chosen by policy makers, in peace economics, in contrast, it is the norm of peace to be achieved that inspires the search for a system design that can reliably deliver on the desired norm.

Peace economics is built on general systems theory exemplified by the work of Kenneth Boulding. Earth may be viewed as a self-regulating (homeostatic) system, consisting of natural and social subsystems. In each, deviation from a set goal is self-corrected through feedback loops. Homeostatic systems are commonly observed in nature, such as in ecology and in the physiology of organisms (e.g., self-regulation of population sizes, self-regulation of body heat). The systems concept has been adopted in the engineering sciences, for example in designing thermostats. The user sets a desired goal state (temperature), the instrument measures the actual state, and for a deviation of sufficient degree a corrective action is taken (heating or cooling).

Relatively new is the insight that social systems designed to achieve certain purposes (e.g., the retirement or pension system) imply a choice architecture that may permit failed or failing social systems to persist. Similarly, choice architecture may facilitate the (re)design of institutions aimed at securing beneficial social outcomes such as peace. This is social engineering applied to the problem of peace (peace engineering) and overlaps with ideas of mechanism design (reverse game theory) in which a solution is stipulated a priori and the structure of the game that would bring about the desired outcome is inferred. In this way, system design links back to normative economics.

== Examples ==
=== Free trade and peace ===
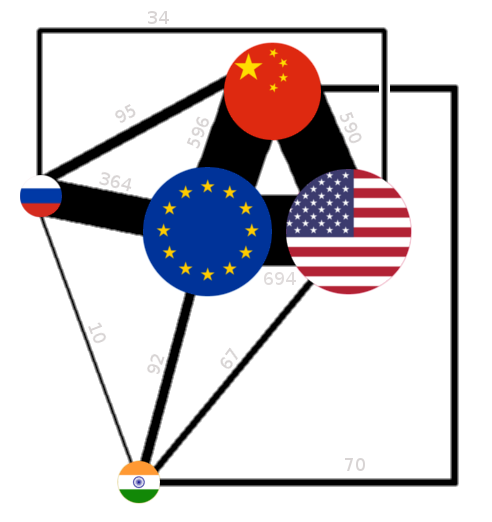
Economic ties between the US, EU, China, Russia and India in 2014 (thickness of the lines is proportional to the bilateral trade volume)

The classical English liberals of the 19th century largely believed that free trade promoted peace. This view, attributed to Adam Smith and Edmund Burke, was evident in the advocacy of Richard Cobden and John Bright, and in the writings of the most prominent English economists and political thinkers of the 19th and early 20th centuries, such as John Stuart Mill and Alfred Marshall. John Maynard Keynes said that he was "brought up" on this idea. A prominent 20th century US exponent of this idea was the Secretary of State under President Franklin Delano Roosevelt, Cordell Hull.

=== World War I and the Paris Peace Conference ===
Upon resigning from the United Kingdom's Treasury team at the Paris Peace Conference in June 1919, John Maynard Keynes penned a small book. Published in 1920, The Economic Consequences of the Peace famously lays out his case for why the allies' Terms of Peace to be imposed on Germany were physically and financially impossible to fulfill and how they would encourage Germany to rise up again. Predicting a coming World War II, Keynes wrote: "... if this view of nations and of their relation to one another (i.e., a Carthaginian Peace) is adopted by the democracies of Western Europe, and is financed by the United States, heaven help us all. If we aim deliberately at the impoverishment of Central Europe, vengeance, I dare predict, will not limp. Nothing can then delay for very long that final civil war between the forces of Reaction and the despairing convulsions of Revolution, before which the horrors of the late German war will fade into nothing, and which will destroy, whoever is victor, the civilisation and the progress of our generation." Although Keynes' effort to change the treaty terms failed, it is a dramatic demonstration of what peace economics is about: the creation of a mutually reinforcing structure of political, economic, and cultural systems to achieve peace such that reversal to violence is unlikely.

=== Capitalism and war, and managed capitalism ===
In the 1930s, in the midst of the Great Depression and with the rise of fascist powers, many western socialist and liberal thinkers believed that capitalism caused war. However, Keynes in his General Theory of Employment, Interest and Money in 1936, argued that this need not be so, and that the management of capitalism along the lines he proposed to promote high employment would be more conducive to peace than laissez-faire capitalism with the gold standard had been. This analysis underlay his approach during World War II to the creation of institutions for international economic governance in the post-war world.

=== World War II, Bretton Woods, and the Marshall Plan ===
Late in World War II, as Nazi-Germany's eventual defeat appeared clear, Henry Morgenthau Jr., then-Secretary of the United States Treasury, advocated the partitioning of Germany, stripping it of its most valuable raw materials and industrial assets, and envisioned the complete pastoralization of Germany. Franklin D. Roosevelt and Winston Churchill agreed to the Morgenthau Plan, in modified form, on 16 September 1944. Following victory, Germany's remaining factories were dismantled, parts, machinery, and equipment shipped abroad, patents expropriated, research forbidden, and useful engineers and scientists transferred out of the country. Despite the negotiation of international treaties at Bretton Woods to create a set of complementary global monetary, trade, and reconstruction and development institutions, namely the International Monetary Fund, the International Bank for Reconstruction and Development (today part of the World Bank Group), and, separately, the General Agreement on Tariffs and Trade (incorporated in today's World Trade Organization), Germany's and Europe's other postwar economies collapsed. Keynes' Economic Consequences of the Peace appeared to repeat themselves. However, Roosevelt had died and Harry S. Truman assumed the U.S. American Presidency on 12 April 1945. Even as the deindustrialization of Germany proceeded as planned, Truman's first Secretary of State, James F. Byrnes, by 1947 took a dismal view of its effects on Germany's impoverished population. So did former president Herbert C. Hoover in a series of reports penned in 1947. Meanwhile, Joseph Stalin's Soviet Union emerged as a formidable power and the implication seemed clear: An economically strengthened, resurgent Germany could either be part of a new Western political, economic, and cultural alliance or else be incorporated into a Soviet one. Truman thus came to abolish the punitive measures imposed on Germany, and his new Secretary of State, General George C. Marshall, formulated what would become the Marshall Plan, in effect from 1948 to 1952. The new global institutions and the unilateral Marshall Plan action combined to endow new institutions with sufficient resources to result in a somewhat unwitting peace economics: clearly designed toward the purpose of international peace and prosperity, yet skewed toward Western Europe and the incipient Cold War. Moreover, the new social architecture was invested with incentives, such as the United Nations Security Council that provided five of its members with permanent seats and veto powers, that, while keeping superpower peace, threatened peace and prosperity in the post-colonial Third World.

=== Origins of the European Union ===
Like Keynes, Jean Monnet participated in the Paris Peace Conference in 1919, in Monnet's case as an assistant to the French delegation. Like Keynes, he envisioned a pan-European economic cooperation zone. Like Keynes, he would be disappointed. Despite this, the French appreciated his good efforts and awarded him with the post of Deputy Secretary-General of the then newly founded League of Nations. Monnet was but 31 years old. He resigned four years later to devote himself to international business and finance in private capacity but resurfaced during the early World War II years in positions of high influence in France, Britain, and the United States, urging Roosevelt to get on with an industrial armaments plan. Following World War II, Monnet crafted the Monnet Plan which aimed to assist France in its reconstruction. This was approved by French Prime Minister Charles de Gaulle shortly before his resignation in January 1946. The transfer of the Saar region took place with U.S. help in 1947, while in 1949, the coal and steel industries of the Ruhr region were placed under the regulation of an international body: the International Authority for the Ruhr. This led to rising frictions between Germany and the allies.

Given his experience during World War I, World War II, and as the French Planning Commissioner, Monnet was in a position to prepare a proposal for French foreign minister Robert Schuman. Working with Paul Reuter, Bernard Clappier, Pierre Uri and Etienne Hirsch, the proposal became the Schuman Declaration of 9 May 1950 (the date now celebrated as Europe Day or Schuman Day). Robert Schuman, the Franco-German-Luxembourgian statesman, French Minister of Finance, Minister of Foreign Affairs and two-time prime minister of France, envisioned a pan-European pooling of markets for crucial coal and steel among Italy, France, Germany, Belgium, the Netherlands, and Luxembourg that would make future war "not only unthinkable but materially impossible." By 1951, this resulted in the formation of the European Coal and Steel Community (ECSC), the forerunner to today's European Union. In contrast to the negotiations surrounding the founding of the United Nations and a set of associated organizations in 1945, the European idea appears to have been deliberately designed as a kernel with organic growth-potential, the precise development of which would be learned in future. Thus, no institutional structures were put in place that, due to accrued vested interests, would later prove to be too difficult to change.

=== Current research directions ===
War at the interstate level has subsided and, to a degree, so have the massive civil wars that took place in the immediate Post-Cold War period (especially in Africa in the 1990s and 2000s). But violent conflict takes place at many levels, from self-directed harm (e.g., self-injury and suicide) and domestic violence between intimate partners and family members to workplace violence and organized criminal violence, all of which are massively costly and ultimately require positive, structural solutions whereby resort to violence becomes "unthinkable," even as it may remain "materially possible."

The Institute for Economics and Peace, a think tank headquartered in Sydney, is "developing metrics to analyse peace and to quantify its economic value. It does this by developing global and national indices, calculating the economic cost of violence, analysing country-level risk and understanding positive peace." More recently, there is a turn towards local implications of economic reforms in conflict-affected societies in an attempt to understand how economies of peace impact on the everyday. This includes the use of qualitative methodologies in a field usually dominated by quantitative approaches.

== Journals ==
Academic journals that publish work by peace economists include the Journal of Conflict Resolution (since 1956), the Journal of Peace Research (since 1964), Conflict Management and Peace Science (since 1973), Defence and Peace Economics (since 1990), Peace Economics, Peace Science, and Public Policy (since 1993), the Economics of Peace and Security Journal (since 2006), the International Journal of Development and Conflict (since 2011), and Business, Peace and Sustainable Development (since 2013).

== Key figures ==
- Kenneth Boulding
- Jurgen Brauer
- Trygve Haavelmo
- Michael Intriligator
- Walter Isard
- John Maynard Keynes
- Jan Tinbergen

== See also ==
- Capitalist peace
- Choice architecture
- Conflict economics
- Doux commerce
- Game theory
- General systems theory
- Mechanism design
