= Richard Mayne (disambiguation) =

Sir Richard Mayne (1796–1868) was a British barrister and joint first Commissioner of the London Metropolitan Police.

Richard Mayne may also refer to:

- Richard Mayne (Bridgwater MP), English Member of Parliament for Bridgwater, 1386–1388
- Richard Mayne (Royal Navy officer) (1835–1892), British Royal Navy admiral, son of the police commissioner
- Richard Mayne (administrator) (1926–2009), British advocate of European integration and writer
