= Jean Monnet House =

Former house of statesman Jean Monnet near Paris

Coordinates: 48.7707°N 1.8518°E

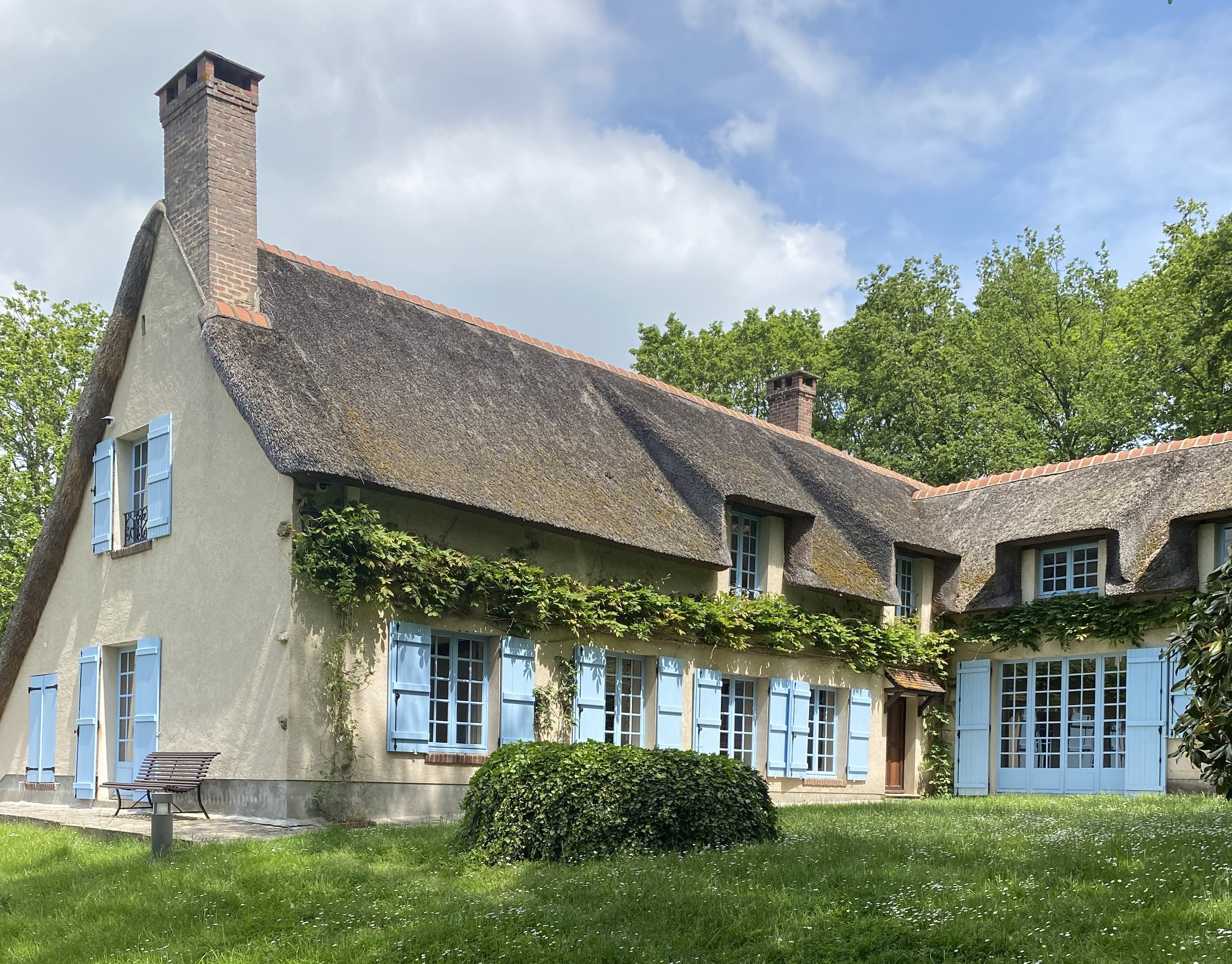
The Jean Monnet House in 2023

The Jean Monnet House, sometimes referred to as Houjarray for the hamlet in which it is located, is a country farmhouse in Bazoches-sur-Guyonne, Yvelines, near Montfort-l'Amaury about 27 miles west of Paris. Jean Monnet purchased the house and surrounding land in 1945, upon his return to France after living abroad since June 1940. Monnet mostly lived there until his death in 1979, except in 1952-1955 when he headed the European Coal and Steel Community's High Authority in Luxembourg. Since 1982, the house has been owned and managed by the European Parliament.

== History ==
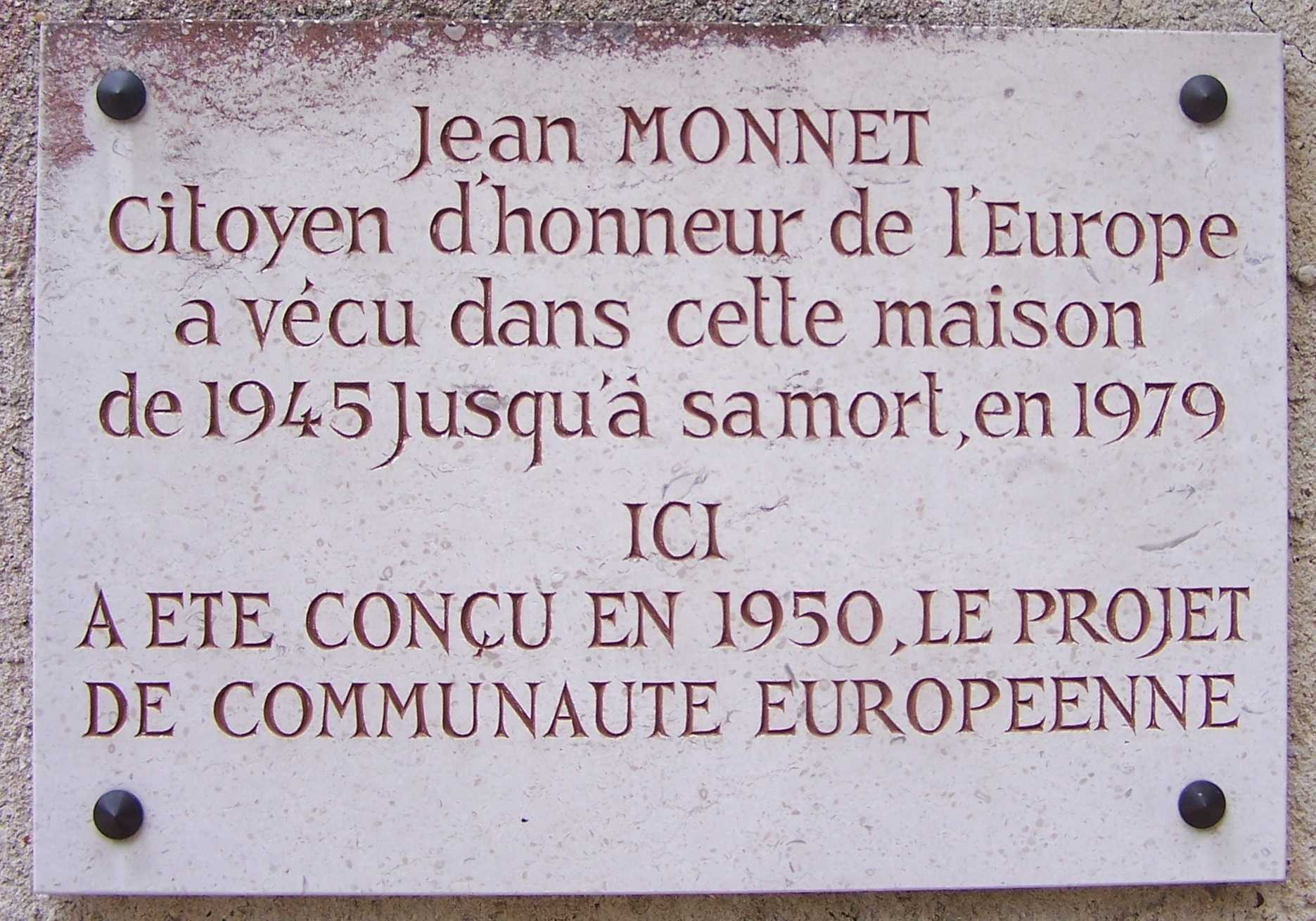
Plaque memorializing Monnet's life in the house and the drafting there of the Schuman Declaration

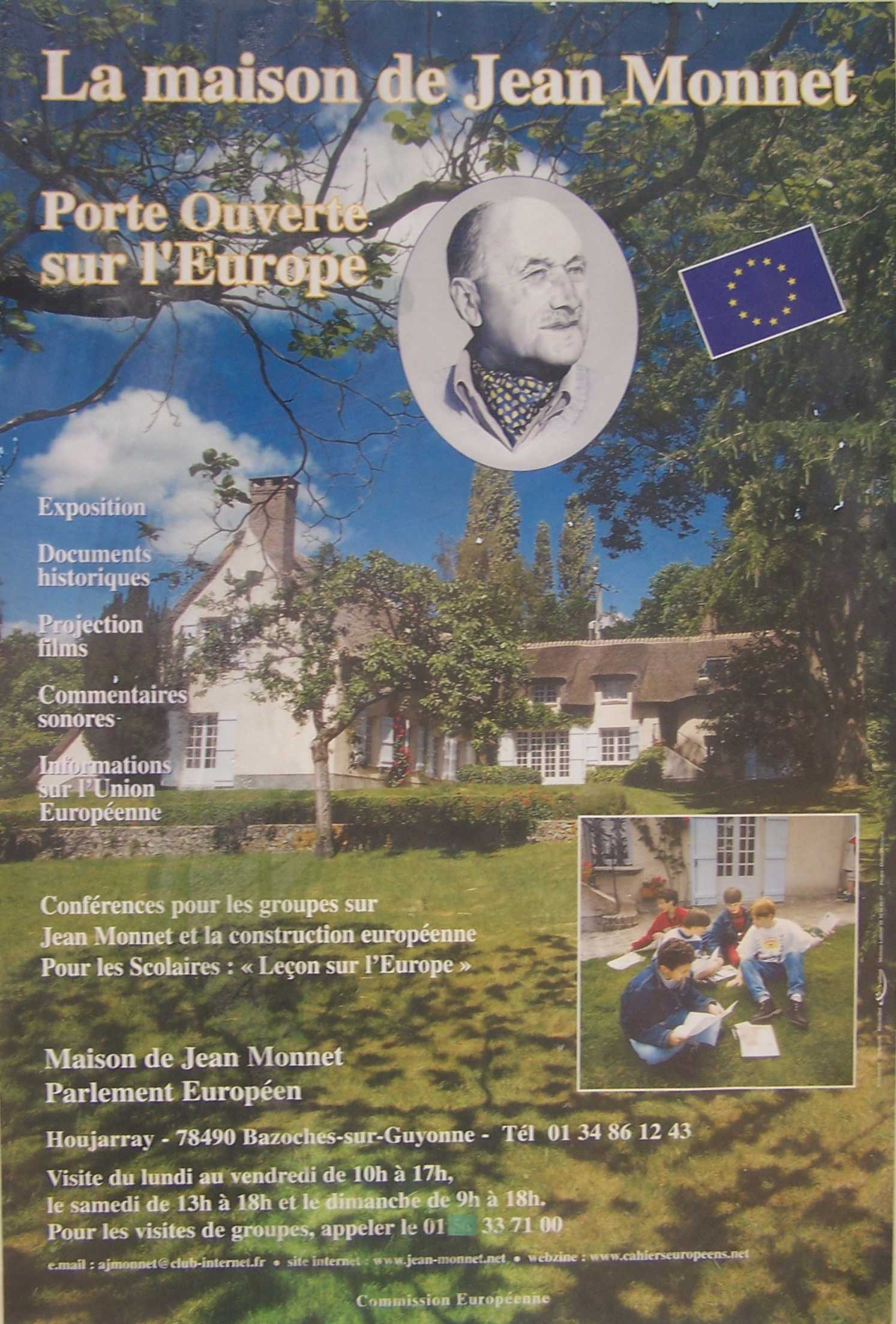
Advert for the Jean Monnet House, 2006

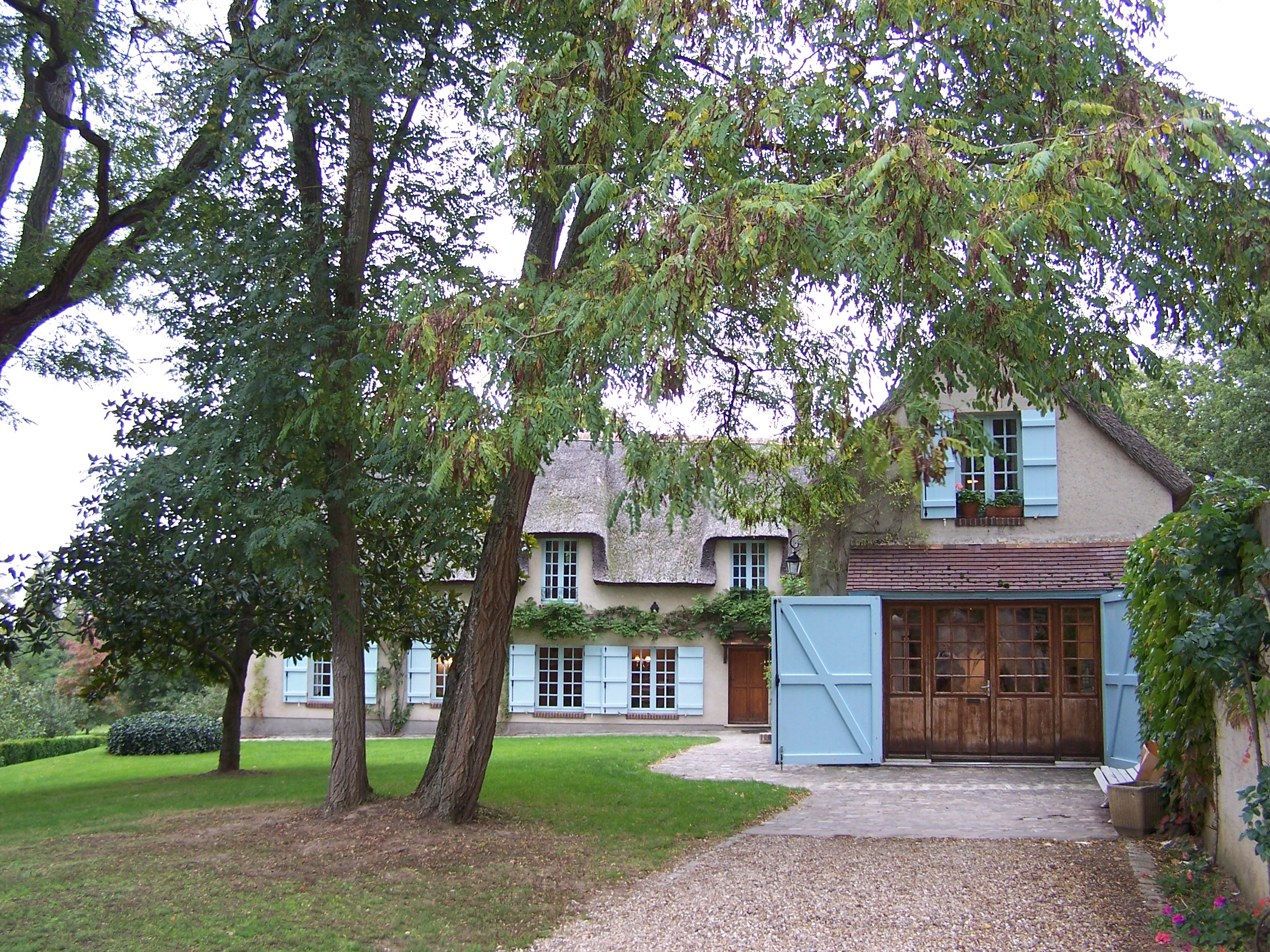
Former garage (right), now museum shop

Monnet purchased the property in 1945 from Ivan Bratt, a Swedish doctor, and spent the rest of his life there with his wife Silvia. Monnet habitually took long morning walks in the forest surrounding the home, before being chauffeured to Paris where he had his office, at the General Planning Commission from 1946 to 1952 and at the Action Committee for the United States of Europe from 1955 to 1976.

Some of the foundational ideas of Europe were considered and created at the house, including the May 1950 Schuman Declaration which Robert Schuman would present as a proposal for the creation of the European Coal and Steel Community. That declaration, which created the foundation for the development of the European Community, was drafted at the house by Monnet and his aides in late April 1950.

Over the years, many important political figures, including Robert Schuman, Walter Hallstein, Paul-Henri Spaak, Konrad Adenauer, and René Pleven, visited Jean Monnet's home and discussed politics and the potential for a common future in Europe. Jean Monnet invited his friends, including Dwight D. Eisenhower, George Ball, and Edward Heath, visiting Paris to join him at his farmhouse on Sundays. Journalists, including the likes of Walter Lippmann, Hubert Beuve-Méry and his neighbor Pierre Viansson-Ponté, also visited Monnet at his home for long conversations. Monnet would ritually regale his guests with the family cognac. Jean Monnet died at his home in Houjarray on 16 March 1979.

In 1982, the European Parliament, considering that the Monnet House was a common heritage of Europeans, bought the house and subsequently refurbished it as a memorial to Monnet. From 1990 to 2018, the European Parliament delegated the house's management to the Jean Monnet Association, created in 1986 and initially chaired by Étienne Hirsch. The European Parliament also built a small conference center next to the house, named after Hans-Gert Pöttering and inaugurated in 2008.

== Description ==
The house includes a ground floor, with displays aiming to recreate their state during Monnet's lifetime, and a first floor, which hosts a permanent exhibition about Monnet's life and role in European history. A wide and open garden slopes down from the house.

== Visitor offer ==
The Jean Monnet House is open seven days per week. Entrance is free. Audio guides are available in English, French and German. Guided tours can be arranged for groups of more than 10 people, with mandatory booking in advance. A visit to the museum lasts 45 - 60 minutes.

== See also ==
- Konrad Adenauer House Foundation in Rhöndorf, Bad Honnef, Germany
- Casa Alcide de Gasperi museum in Pieve Tesino, Italy
- Robert Schuman House in Scy-Chazelles, France
