= Action Committee for the United States of Europe =

Initiative to catalyze European integration

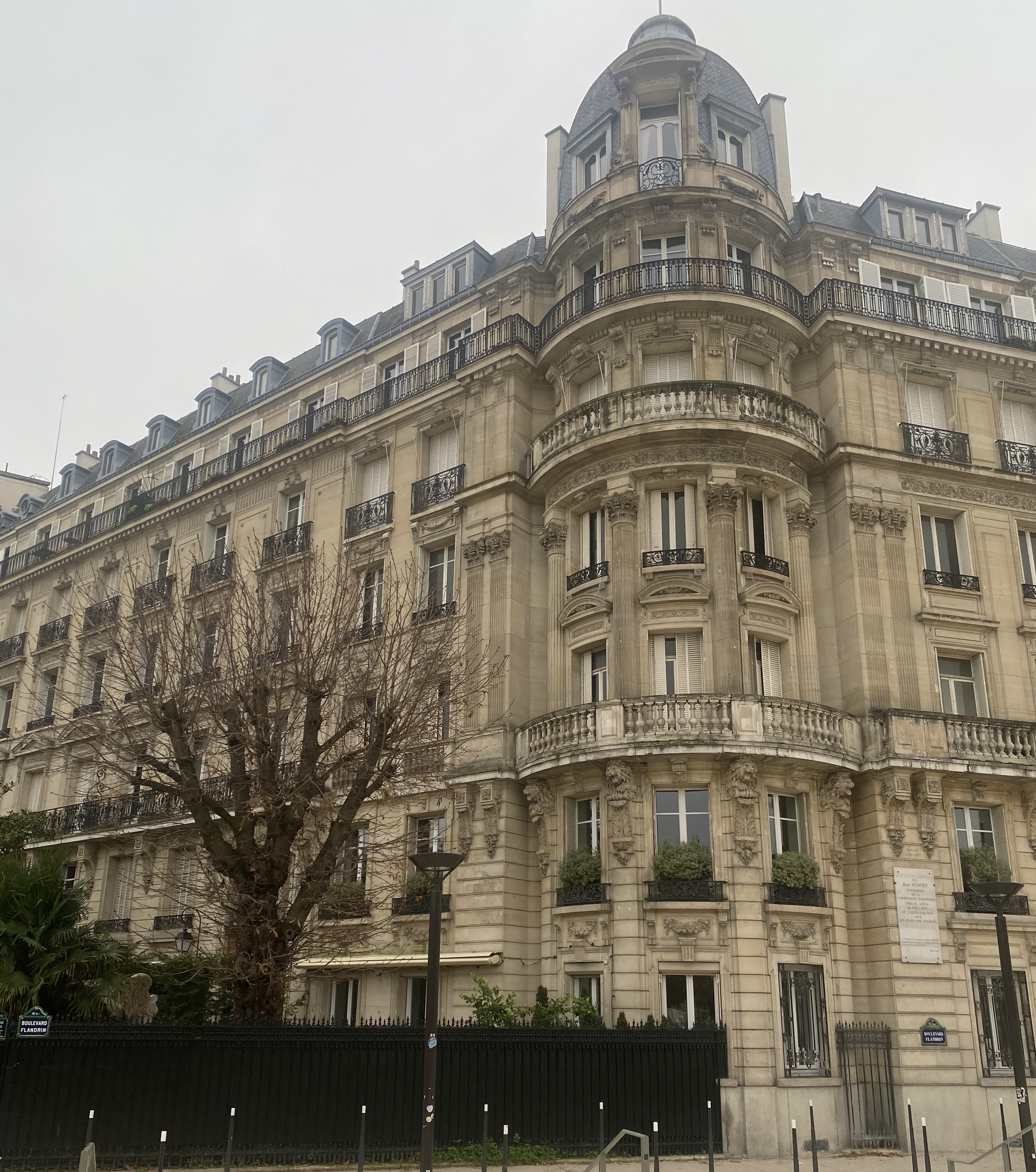
Apartment building at 3, Avenue Foch in Paris, where the Action Committee had its permanent offices on the third floor

The Action Committee for the United States of Europe (French: Comité d'action pour les États-Unis d'Europe), colloquially referred to as the Monnet Committee, was a collective initiative spearheaded by Jean Monnet from 1955 to 1975 that aimed at accelerating European integration through informal dialogue among key political and trade unions leaders. It was a civil society endeavor that lied outside of any formal policymaking process, but involved the direct participation of organizations that collectively wielded overwhelming decision-making power within its geographical scope, namely the participating countries of the European Coal and Steel Community and from 1958 of the European Communities.

== Name ==
The expression "action committee" (French: comité d'action) was in vogue in the 1950s and had already been used in the context of advocacy for European integration, not least by the European Movement which from 1952 to 1960 had a body successively named Comité d'action pour une Assemblée constituante européenne, Comité d'Action pour la Communauté supranationale européenne, then simply Comité d'action. It signaled Monnet's ambition for his new initiative to be more outcomes-oriented than a traditional think tank.

The reference to the United States of Europe, a vague phrase that did not indicate a specific institutional endgame, was both a reference to Victor Hugo, who had used it in 1849 in his landmark speech at the International Peace Congress, and a reflection of the generally pro-American orientation of France in the mid-1950s.

== History ==
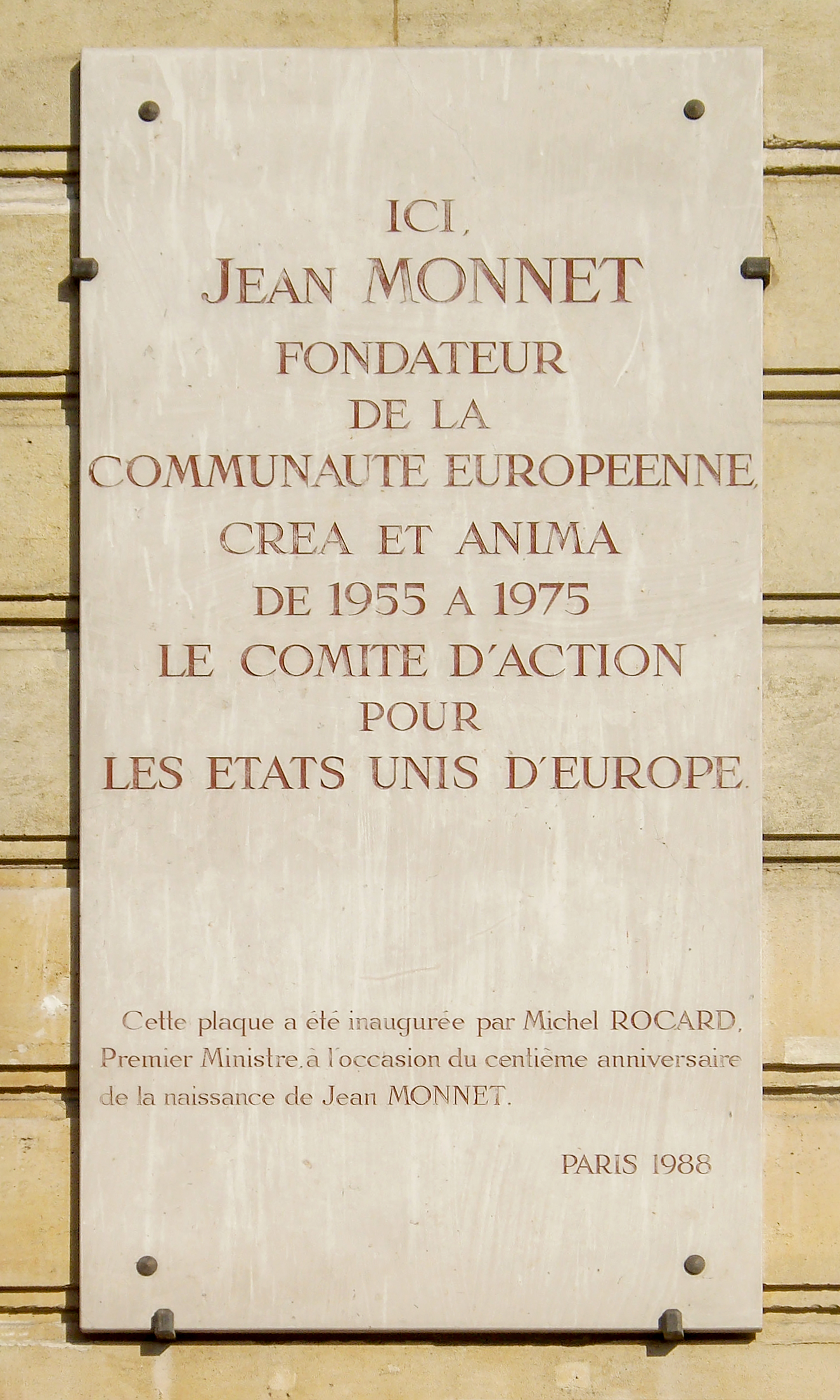
Plaque on 83, avenue Foch in Paris, the former secretariat office of the Action Committee

Following a stroke in early June 1954 and the French rejection of the European Defence Community in late August, Monnet felt hemmed in as president of the High Authority of the European Coal and Steel Community (ECSC) in Luxembourg and announced his resignation in November 1954. Because he was uniquely associated with the European integration project, discussions ensued with the ECSC member countries on whether to give him a new mandate. During that period, he reflected actively about alternative ways to advance the European cause. The first indications of what would become the Action Committee appear in a confidential memo he wrote on 4 January 1955.

Eventually, at the Messina Conference of 1-3 June 1955, it was decided to replace Monnet with René Mayer as President of the ECSC High Authority. In mid-June, Monnet moved back from Luxembourg to his house at Houjarray near Paris. He immediately gave an interview in France's major daily newspaper Le Monde, in which he hinted at the new project: "To persuade the governments [whose representatives had met in Messina] to make the choices they have delayed, and to propose to their respective parliaments the federal institutions that are indispensably needed, it is necessary and urgent for political parties, trade unions, and all those in favor of European unity to organize themselves in order to make their convictions prevail in the public and with governments. As far as I am concerned, I will of course do everything I can for such outcomes to happen without delay."

Monnet spent June and July 1955 reaching out to contacts in all six ECSC countries, leaving out only the Communists (who at that time were resolutely opposed to European integration), France's Gaullists, and employers representatives who had generally resented the ECSC's establishment and preferred to keep national market protections. He started collecting confirmations of commitment from mid-July, and by late September had achieved his aim of securing participation of all relevant Socialists and Social Democrats, Christian Democrats, and trade unionists. He then completed the group with Liberals and other parties.

On 12 October 1955, Monnet circulated a press release, under embargo until noon the next day, with the names of the Action Committee's 33 initial participants and their respective organizations. The press release reproduced the text of the letter Monnet had sent to them, which detailed the setup and ambition of the committee: "The personalities who participate in the establishment of this Committee will each ask their organisations to adhere. [...] The Committee will assure the unified actions of the member organisations in order to arrive by concrete accomplishments at a United States of Europe. [...] Mere cooperation between governments will not suffice. It is indispensable for States to delegate certain of their powers to European federal institutions responsible to ("mandataires de") all the participating countries taken as a whole." As expected, Communist-controlled media responded with hostility, as did employer-controlled newspapers such as Germany's Frankfurter Allgemeine Zeitung, but reactions in most mainstream media were hopeful and positive.

The Action Committee was Monnet's response to the challenge of bringing the European integration project forward in the face of nationalist pushback, political inertia, and special interests. It brought together leaders from political parties and European trade unions in an inclusive format that favored candid discussions and the emergence of consensus positions which were subsequently made public. Monnet thus intended to bind the participants to deliver on the collectively agreed course of action. The first meeting was initially planned to take place in November 1955, but was delayed and held in Paris on 18 January 1956.

In the 1960s, the Action Committee promoted a number of projects, including the creation of a European federal district (without any success), UK accession to the European Communities, and Monnet's "partnership" concept of equal relations between Europe and the United States. In 1968, the Action Committee's membership was opened to British participants.

By the 1970s, Monnet (who was born in 1888) had reached advanced old age. From late 1974, the formalization of regular European Council meetings, which the Action Committee had advocated, was eventually achieved under newly elected French president Valéry Giscard d'Estaing, partly substituting for the role Monnet had envisioned for the Committee. Simultaneously, the latter's buildup was becoming less relevant with the gradual erosion of the role of trade unions in European society and public life. Efforts by some Action Committee members and staff to identify a figure that could credibly succeed Monnet as Action Committee chair were unsuccessful. Monnet ended the Action Committee's activity when he resigned from it on 9 May 1975, exactly 25 years after the Schuman Declaration which he had directly inspired and helped draft.

== Operations ==
As soon as he returned from Luxembourg in June 1955, Monnet had established his personal office in an apartment owned by his brother-in-law Alessandro de Bondini at 83, avenue Foch in Paris. Aside from Monnet himself, the permanent staff included Max Kohnstamm, Vice President, and Jacques Van Helmont, Secretary-General (except from 1958 to 1962), in unpaid positions. Richard Mayne, François Duchêne were among the permanent paid staffers, joined in later years by Pascal Fontaine. Three secretaries joined between 1956 and 1958 and enabled the Action Committee's work: Christiane Mazerand, Dory Zingg, and Françoise Schonfeld. Occasional help and advice was provided by members of Monnet's extensive network of friends and protégés such as François Fontaine (Pascal's father), Étienne Hirsch, Émile Noël, and on a less regular basis, Guido Carli, Antoine Chastenet, Bernard Clappier, Paul Delouvrier, Michel Gaudet, Jean Guyot, Robert Marjolin, Robert Toulemon, Robert Triffin, and Pierre Uri.

The funding of the Action Committee was a perennial concern, even though its office was managed frugally. Swiss scholar Henri Rieben assisted it by creating a nonprofit entity in Lausanne, the Société de gestion administrative du Comité d'Action pour les États-Unis d'Europe, in June 1957. A committee for legal, administrative and financial matters chaired by German trade union leader Ludwig Rosenberg helped to organize funding, on the basis that the overall contribution of participating political parties would equal that of participating trade unions, but individual contributions within each of these two groups were determined on an ad hoc basis under a general principle of perceived fairness. In December 1956, that committee together with Monnet decided to establish an in-house think tank, initially dubbed the bureau d'études and later the centre de documentation, which from early 1958 was led by Duchêne. This partial outsourcing of research work allowed some revenue to be raised from outside the participating European countries, which Monnet had committed to his German interlocutors not to use for the core activity of the Action Committee itself, including two loans from the Ford Foundation in 1959-1961. Monnet also funded the Action Committee through personal loans, partly funded by the sale in 1962 of his eponymous cognac firm, of which he was however only one of several family shareholders.

In order to facilitate the emergence of consensus, no minutes were kept of the Action Committee's meetings themselves; the only text was that of the concluding declaration of each meeting, which was made public. In several occasions, that declaration was then submitted to national parliaments for formal approval, an unprecedented procedure for what always remained a civil society organization. The declaration of the Action Committee's first meeting in January 1956 was thus formally endorsed by the legislatures of five of the six ECSC countries, all but Italy.

== Assessment ==
The impact of the Action Committee is intrinsically hard to assess, because it focused on influence and on catalyzing collective decisions that would be formally enacted in other venues. In its crucial early period of activity, between the Messina Conference in June 1955 and the Euratom Treaty and Treaty of Rome of 25 March 1957, its role has been estimated as "null" by French official Robert Marjolin but "enormous" by Dutch negotoiator Ernst van der Beugel, echoed in that by his colleague Johannes Linthorst Homan. After Charles de Gaulle returned to power in France in May 1958, the Action Committee shifted to a more defensive role, helping to safeguard the legacy of already established European institutions as opposed to creating new ones.

== Meetings ==
The Action Committee held three meetings in 1956, its first year of activity, and at least one meeting in most subsequent years, the 18th and last one in 1973. Many but far from all of the meetings were held in Paris. The list below is incomplete.

- 1st meeting in Paris, 18 January 1956
- 2nd meeting in Amsterdam, 25 July 1956
- 3rd meeting in Paris, 19-20 September 1956
- 4th meeting in Paris, 6-7 May 1957
- 8th meeting in Paris, 11-12 July 1960
- 12th meeting in West Berlin, 8-9 May 1965
- 13th meeting in Brussels, 15-16 June 1967
- 16th meeting in Bonn, 15-16 December 1969
- 18th meeting in Brussels, spring 1973

== Members ==
The Action Committee started with 33 members representing their respective organizations, as listed in Monnet's press release of 13 October 1955.

20 political party leaders:

- Martin Blank of the German Free Democratic Party
- Sieuwert Bruins Slot of the Dutch Anti-Revolutionary Party
- Jaap Burger of the Dutch Labour Party
- Max Buset of the Belgian Socialist Party
- Maurice Destenay of the Belgian Liberal Party
- Alexander Elbrächter of the German Party
- Amintore Fanfani of the Italian Christian Democracy
- Maurice Faure of the French Radical Party of the Left
- Jean Fohrmann of the Luxembourg Socialist Workers' Party
- Pierre Garet of the French Independents Republicans
- Kurt Georg Kiesinger of the Christian Democratic Union of Germany
- Ugo La Malfa of the Italian Republican Party
- Robert Lecourt of the French Popular Republican Movement
- Théo Lefèvre of the Belgian Christian Social Party
- Nicolas Margue of the Christian Social People's Party of Luxembourg
- Gianmatteo Matteotti of the Italian Democratic Socialist Party
- Guy Mollet of the French Section of the Workers' International
- Erich Ollenhauer of the Social Democratic Party of Germany
- René Pleven of the French Democratic and Socialist Union of the Resistance
- Carl Romme of the Dutch Catholic People's Party

13 trade Union leaders:

- J. Albers of the Dutch Workers’ Movement
- Robert Bothereau of the French Workers' Force
- Maurice Bouladoux of the French Confederation of Christian Workers
- August Cool of the Belgian Confederation of Christian Trade Unions
- Walter Freitag of the German Trade Union Confederation
- Cees Hazenbosch of the Dutch Christian National Trade Union Federation
- Heinrich Imig of the German German Miners’ Federation
- Henk Oosterhuis of the Dutch Confederation of Trade Unions
- Antoine Krier of the Luxembourg Workers' Union
- Giulio Pastore of the Italian Confederation of Trade Unions
- André Renard of the General Labour Federation of Belgium
- Heinrich Sträter of the German IG Metall
- Italo Viglianesi of the Italian Labour Union

Later members included Edmond Leburton and Leo Tindemans from Belgium; Gaston Defferre, Valéry Giscard d'Estaing, Pierre Pflimlin, and Antoine Pinay from France; Rainer Barzel, Willy Brandt, Walter Scheel, Helmut Schmidt, and Herbert Wehner from Germany; Arnaldo Forlani, Giovanni Malagodi, Aldo Moro, Pietro Nenni, Flaminio Piccoli, Mariano Rumor, and Giuseppe Saragat from Italy; Pierre Werner from Luxembourg; Barend Biesheuvel and Joop den Uyl from the Netherlands; and Alec Douglas-Home, Edward Heath, and Roy Jenkins from the UK. In total, more than 130 individual leaders have been members of the Action Committee.

== See also ==
- International Peace Congress
- American Committee on United Europe
- Action Committee for European Democracy
