= Jean Monnet Foundation for Europe =

- (in French) Fondation Jean Monnet pour l'Europe
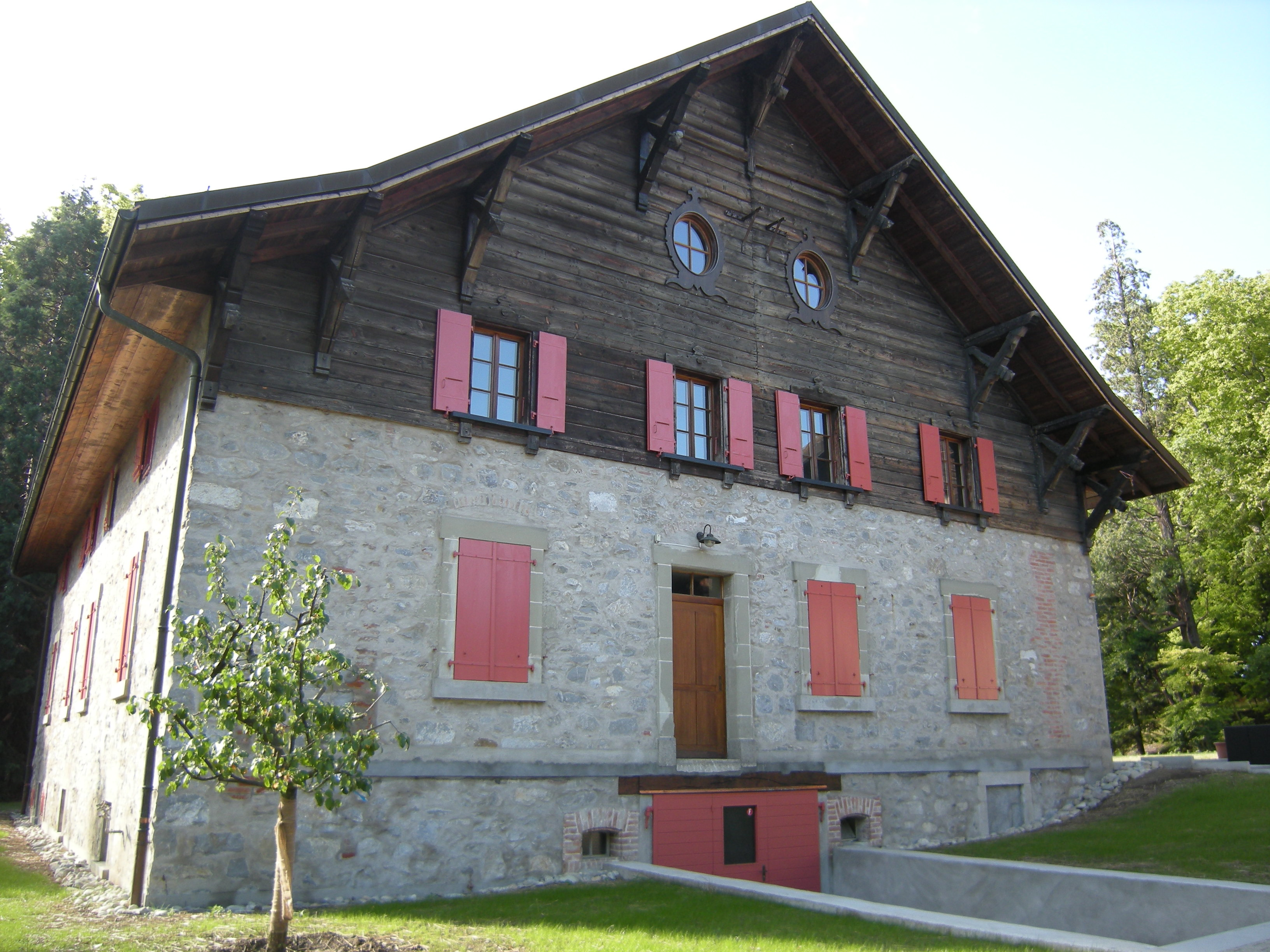
- The foundation is based on the campus of the University of Lausanne.
- Formation: 1978
- Founder: Jean Monnet
- Location: Campus of the University of Lausanne (Switzerland)
- Official language: French and English
- Website: jean-monnet.ch

The Jean Monnet Foundation for Europe is a public-utility and independent institution, created in 1978 by Jean Monnet and Henri Rieben, and dedicated to the conservation of Monnet's archives. Based in Lausanne since its creation, the foundation is located since 1981 at the Ferme de Dorigny, on the campus of the University of Lausanne. The foundation's activities range from the organization of events (conferences, dialogues, academic seminars and Gold Medal Award ceremonies) to the conservation and the enhancement of its collection of archives and documents.

The origins of the foundation date from a meeting between Jean Monnet and Henri Rieben in 1955 and it is located at the "Farm of Dorigny", in the heart of the campus of the University of Lausanne in Lausanne, Switzerland.

The foundation is inspired by the thinking, methods and actions of Jean Monnet.

== History ==
The origins of the foundation can be traced back to the encounter between Jean Monnet and Henri Rieben in 1955. From that time, several associations were created at the initiative of the two men. Reasons for the creation of these organizations are found when considering the devotion to and the great interest that Rieben had in Monnet, as well as the easiness to create associations in Switzerland.

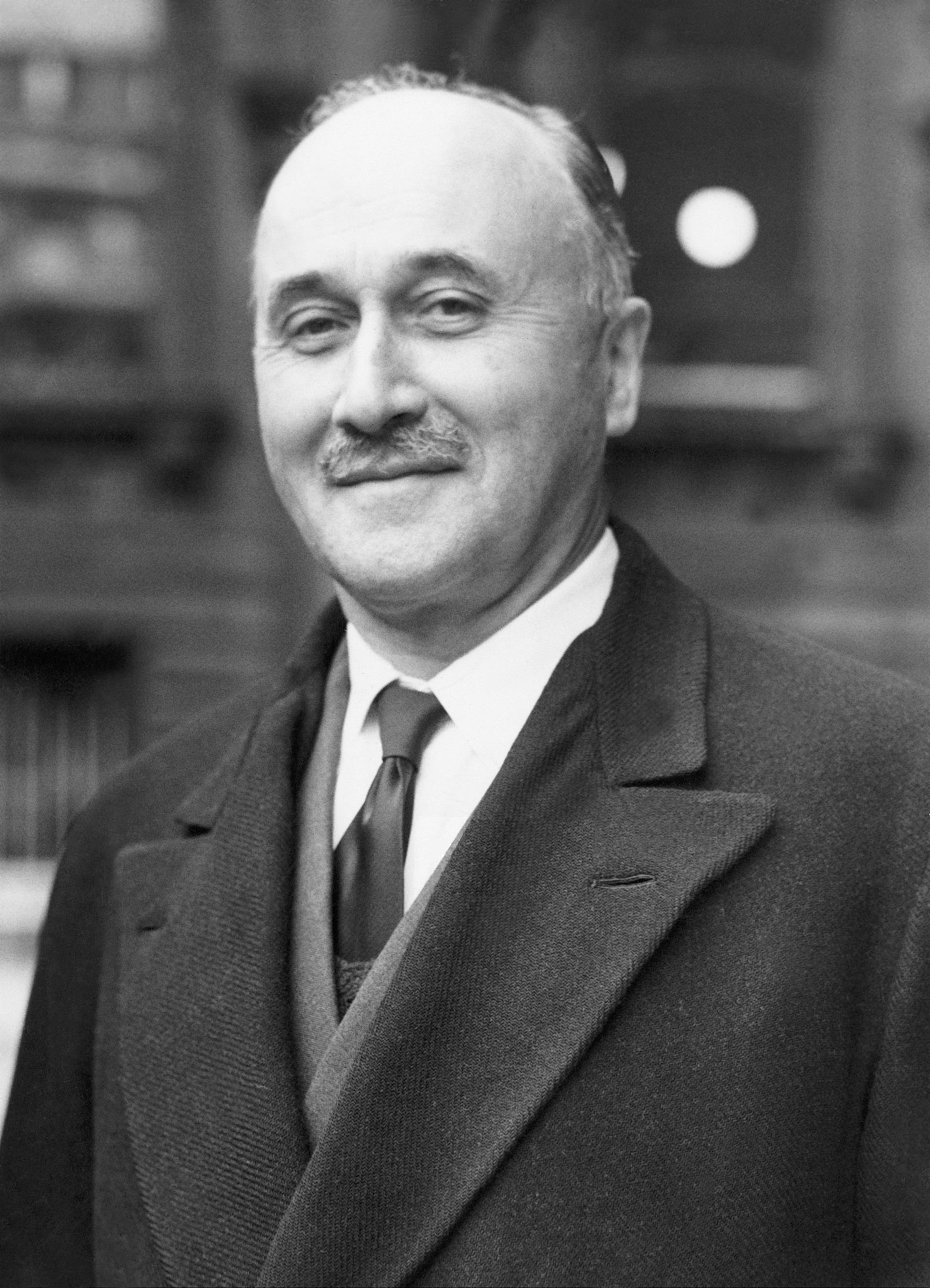
Jean Monnet in London (1952)

The first of these initiatives was the Association de gestion administrative du Comité d'action pour les États-Unis d'Europe, which had for mission the administrative management of the Action Committee for the United States of Europe. Registered in 1955 in Lausanne, Henri Rieben becomes its administrative secretary and Monnet its president. The facilities of the Comité d'action, however, were located in Paris, at the Avenue Foch, until its dissolution in 1975.

In 1957, Jean Monnet and Henri Rieben created another association in Lausanne, the Centre de recherches européennes, dedicated to creating a documentation center for European Studies. Under the command of Henri Rieben, the center published numerous academic works as part of the "Cahiers rouges" collection.

The third association was created in 1963 in Lausanne with the signatures of Jean Monnet as president and Henri Rieben as administrative secretary. Under the name of "Institut de recherches historiques européennes" (translated as "Institute for European Historical Research"), its aim was to gather archives and produce knowledge about the history of European integration. It was also located at the Avenue Foch, in Paris. Its first editorial project was the publication of the Memoirs of Jean Monnet.

In 1978, Jean Monnet entrusted the institute with all of his archives. The transfer from Paris to Lausanne was carried out during the same year, six months before Monnet's death. The institute was dissolved in 1983, as the Centre de recherches européennes was created. In the same year, Jean Monnet and Rieben created a new association, under the name of Fondation Jean Monnet pour l'Europe. Its goals were to preserve the Jean Monnet archives and, "inspired by the thinking, methods and actions of Jean Monnet", to support initiatives dedicated to the establishment of European unity.

== Archives ==
The foundation houses the personal archives of Jean Monnet, Robert Schuman, Robert Marjolin, François Fontaine, Jacques Van Helmont, Paolo Emilio Taviani, Robert Triffin, and the Earl of Perth, and of other figures from European institutions.

== Gold Medal of the Foundation ==
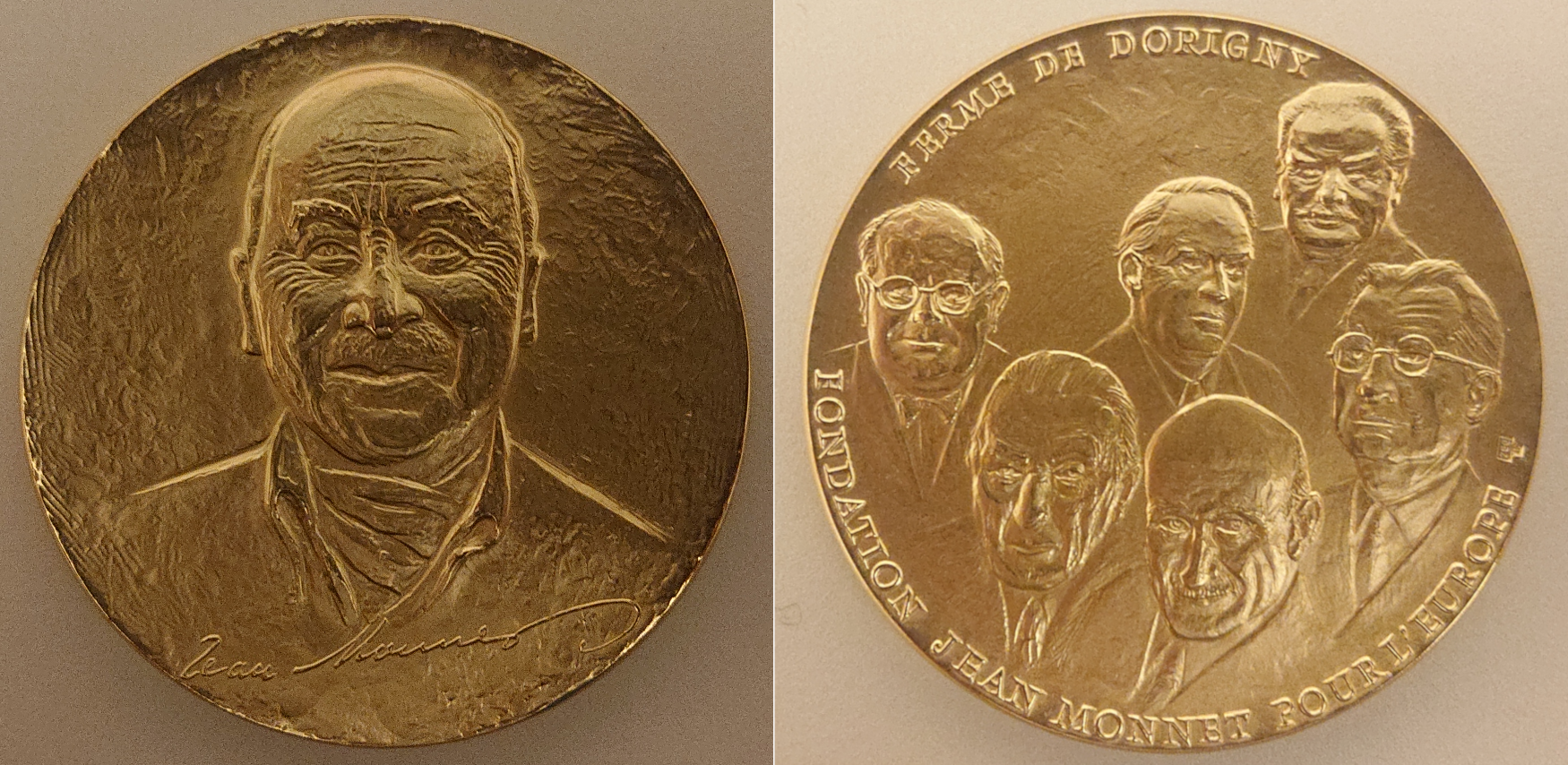
Obverse and reverse of the Jean Monnet Foundation Gold Medal.

The Gold Medal of the Jean Monnet Foundation for Europe (Médaille d'or de la Fondation Jean Monnet pour l'Europe) was created in November 1990 by Huguenin, medal makers in Le Locle. The obverse, by Henri Jacot, shows a portrait of Jean Monnet with his signature. The reverse, by Bernard Gaillard, features six portraits of the statesmen who spearheaded the creation of the first European community, the European Coal and Steel Community (ECSC). They are Konrad Adenauer, Robert Schuman, Alcide De Gasperi, Paul-Henri Spaak, Johan Willem Beyen and Joseph Bech. The Foundation's Gold Medal was awarded to :

- 1996: Juan Carlos, King of Spain
- 2000: Carlo Azeglio Ciampi, President of Italy
- 2002: Ferenc Mádl, President of the Republic of Hungary
- 2007: Helmut Kohl, former Chancellor of Germany
- 2008: Jean-Claude Juncker, former Prime Ministers of Luxembourg
- 2011:
  - Emilio Colombo, Italian Senator for life and former President of the European Parliament
  - Javier Solana, former European Union High Representative for Common Foreign and Security Policy
- 2014:
  - Herman Van Rompuy, President of the European Council
  - Martin Schulz, President of the European Parliament
  - José Manuel Barroso, President of the European Commission
- 2017:
  - Mario Draghi, President of the European Central Bank
- 2024:
  - Parliament of Ukraine (Verkhovna Rada), represented by its President Ruslan Stefanchuk

== Presidents of the Foundation ==
- 1978–2005: Henri Rieben
- 2006–2008: Bronislaw Geremek
- 2009–2014: José Maria Gil-Robles
- Since 2015: Pat Cox

== Publications ==
The Jean Monnet Foundation for Europe has been publishing works as part of two different collections:

- The "Cahiers rouges" collection, created in 1957. Under the command of Henri Rieben, it will present historical sources, monographs and conference proceedings about subjects ranging from Monnet's life to international relations between Switzerland and Europe. The collection aims to nourish debates about both the history and the current course of European integration, as well as establishing a collective memory of European construction by collecting and publishing testimonies of protagonists.
- "Debates and Documents" collection, launched in 2014. The series aims to contribute to current debates about European issues and to enhance the archival collection of the foundation. It publishes about two issues per year.

== See also ==
- History of the European Union
- Lausanne campus
