= Hirsch Commission =

The Hirsch Commission was the second Commission of the European Atomic Energy Community (Euratom), between 1959 and 1962. Its president was Étienne Hirsch of France. There was one further Commission before the institutions of Euratom were merged with those of the European Coal and Steel Community and the European Economic Community in 1967 to become the European Communities.
