= Monnet Cognac =

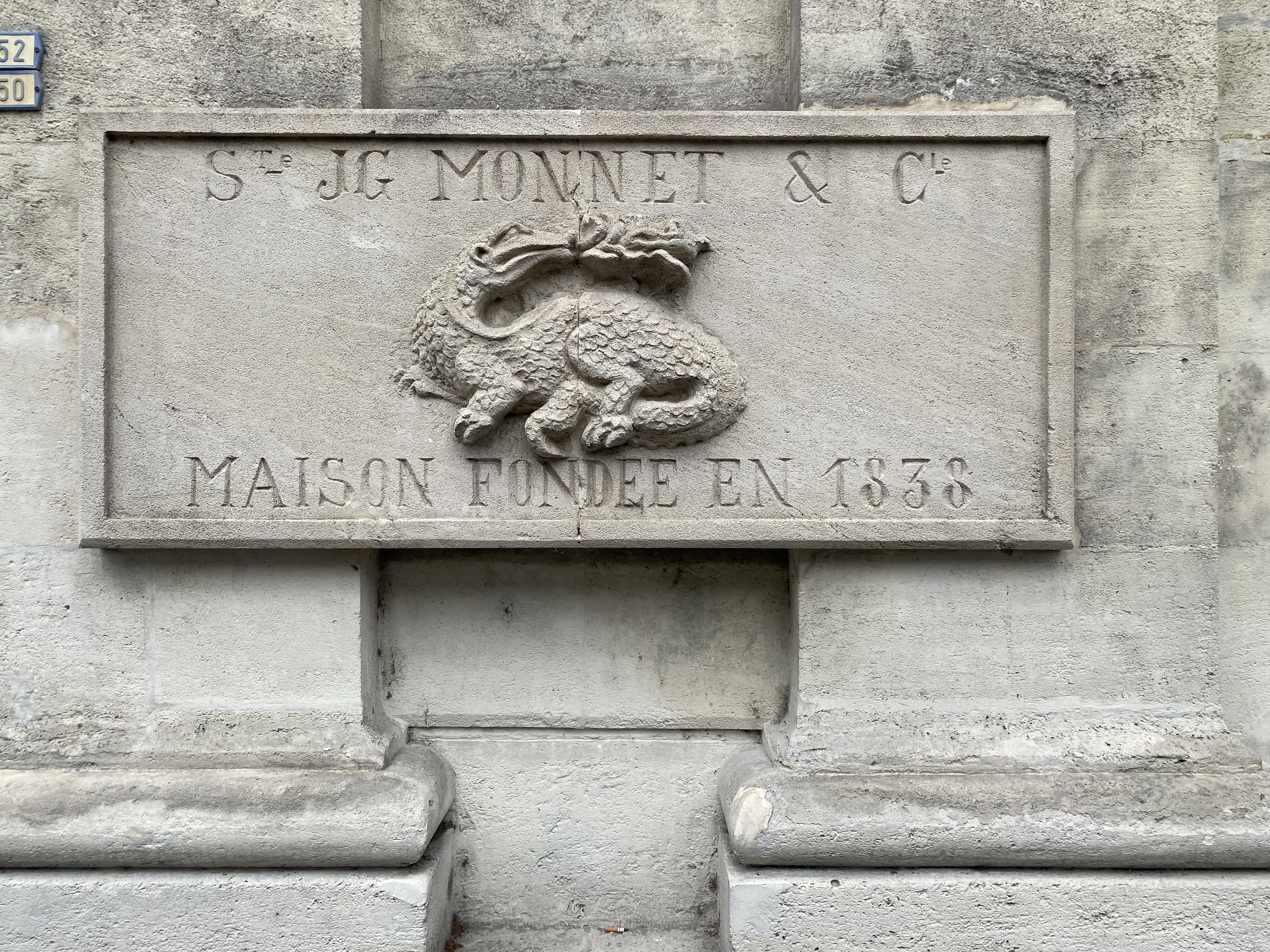
Salamander emblem of Monnet Cognac at the company's cellars in Cognac city

Monnet, also J.-G. Monnet is a brand of cognac that was associated with the Monnet family from 1897 to 1962 and retains its name. The family's most illustrious member Jean Monnet, founding father of European integration, worked at the family firm and often made references to its formative role in shaping his beliefs and world view: cognac involves patience, because the product must age for years before commercialization, and it entails a global perspective, because the market is mostly outside France.

== History ==
=== Cognac producers' cooperative ===
In 1838, Pierre-Antoine de Salignac, a progressively minded local aristocrat, gathered several hundred wine growers to form the Société des Propriétaires Vinicoles de Cognac (SPVC), a cooperative endeavor aiming at marketing their product directly to international clients and bypassing the dominant market power of established houses such as Hennessy or Martell. The company soon sold the brandy under the SPVC brand, and prospered during much of the 19th century. The brand's emblem from inception in 1838 was a salamander. This echoed both the cognac production process (as that animal is reputed to survive in fire, evoking the heating phase of distillation) and the local history, since the salamander was also on the arms of the royal house of Valois-Angoulême and of its most famous scion Francis I, born in Cognac in 1494.

For nearly six decades the SPVC was led by members of the Salignac family, but in 1897 the shareholders dismissed them and chose as its new head Jean-Gabriel Monnet, a former employee of the rival Pellisson cognac producer. J.-G. Monnet subsequently appeared as a brand alongside SPVC in 1901.

=== Monnet family ownership ===
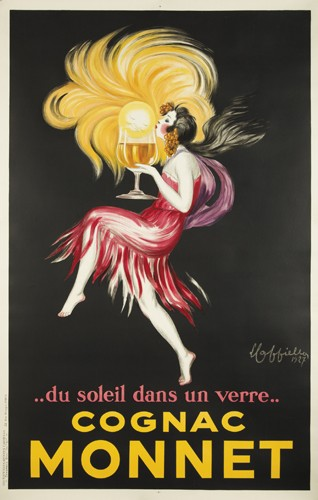
Advertisement for Monnet Cognac by Leonetto Cappiello, 1927

Jean-Gabriel Monnet strengthened his control of the enterprise in 1905 and transformed it into a joint-stock company in 1920. His son Jean Monnet worked for the firm in his youth before the outbreak of World War I, and again briefly in the mid-1920s after resigning from his position at the League of Nations in December 1923.

In the early 1920s, Monnet had the second-largest market share in the United States behind Hennessy. In the 1950s, it became the official cognac supplier of the royal court of Sweden, while remaining one of the top 10 cognacs in the United States. Control of the company remained in the Monnet family until 1962.

=== Developments since 1962 ===
In 1962, partly to finance Jean Monnet's Action Committee for the United States of Europe, the family sold its control of Monnet cognac to the Rhineland-based Scharlachberg winery. Robert Monnet, a cousin of Jean Monnet, continued to manage it until his death in 1971. In 1987, Scharlachberg sold Monnet cognac to brandy producer Asbach, which in turn sold it to Hennessy in 1991. In 1992-1993, Hennessy transferred it to another of its brands, Hine, and in 2003 sold Hine (and thus also Monnet) to CL Financial, a Trinidadian and Tobagonian conglomerate that also owned spirits producer Angostura, while retaining ownership of the original production facility. In 2013, then-struggling CL Financial sold Hine and Monnet to EDV SAS, an investment vehicle of the Guerrand-Hermès family, owners of a significant stake in the Hermès luxury brand and also formerly associated with wine retailer Nicolas until its 1988 acquisition by Castel Group.

Since its sale by the Monnet family, Monnet cognac had been sold mostly in Asia, Russia, and the Nordic countries. Its owners since 2013 have initiated a revival of the brand and restarted sales in other markets, e.g. Australia, in an attempt to challenge the dominance of Hennessy, Rémy Martin, Courvoisier and Martell which by the early 2020s together represented 93 percent of global cognac sales.

== Former premises ==
The Monnet cognac production facilities were initially built from 1838 to 1848 by the SPVC and covered more than 50,000 square meters, including the chais, cooper's workshop, production workshop, and office, on rue de Pons (now avenue Paul Firino Martell) in the Gâte-Bourse suburban neighborhood of Cognac. There were still 30 employees working there in 1986. Production stopped in 2004, and in 2006 LVMH sold it to the Cognac municipality. After a decade of neglect, British businessman Javad Marandi purchased the site in July 2016 and redeveloped it as a luxury hotel, designed by Paris-based architect Didier Poignant and opened in 2018 as Hotel Chais Monnet. The complex includes the former mansion built by the Salignacs and used by the Monnets following the 1897 management change, in which Jean Monnet grew up and which now serves as a meetings' facility of the hotel; and a high-ceilinged cellar known as the "chai-cathédrale", built for 40 barrels (foudres) of 250 hectolitres each, converted into a restaurant named Les Foudres.

=== Gallery ===
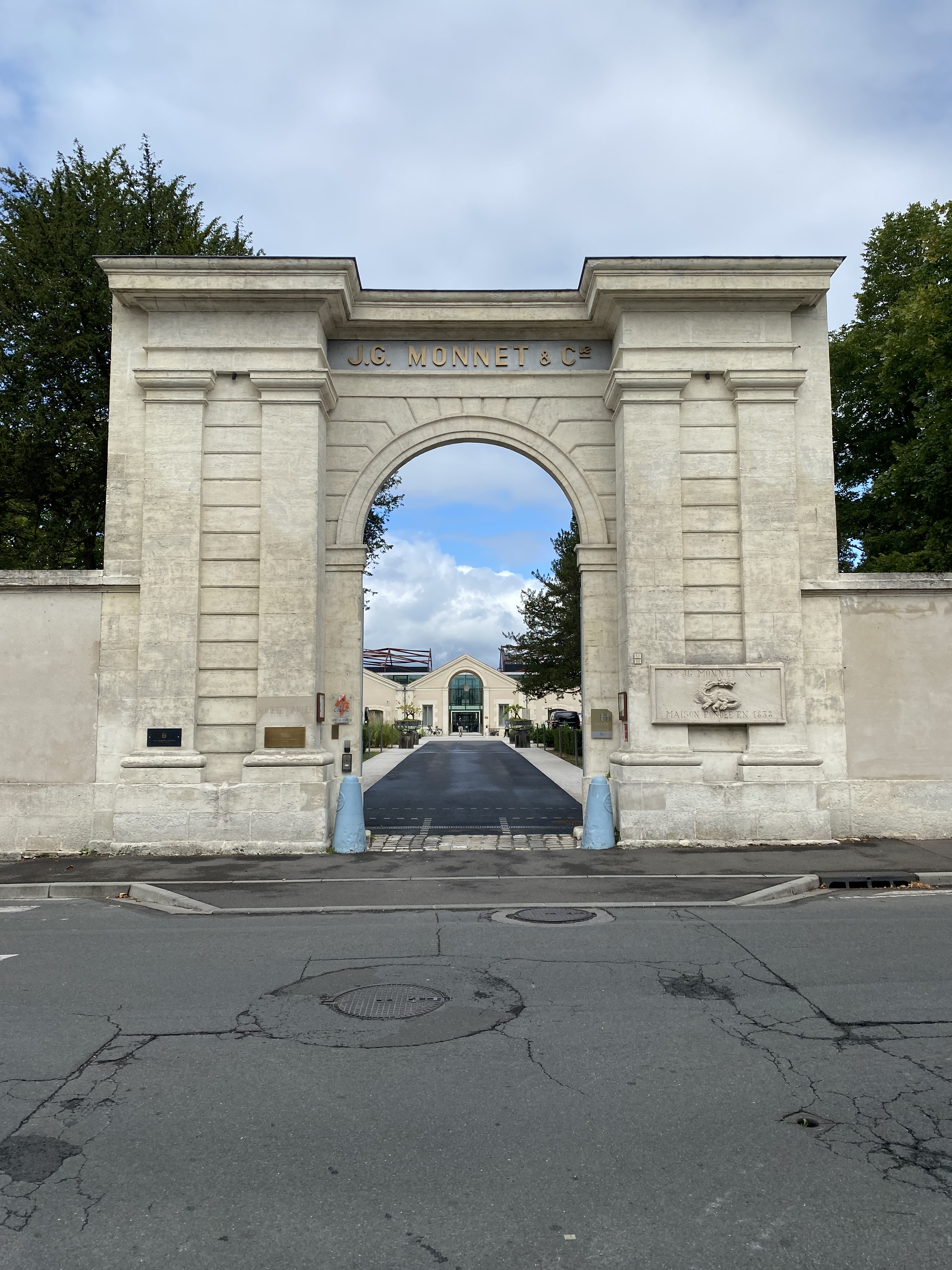
Entrance gate

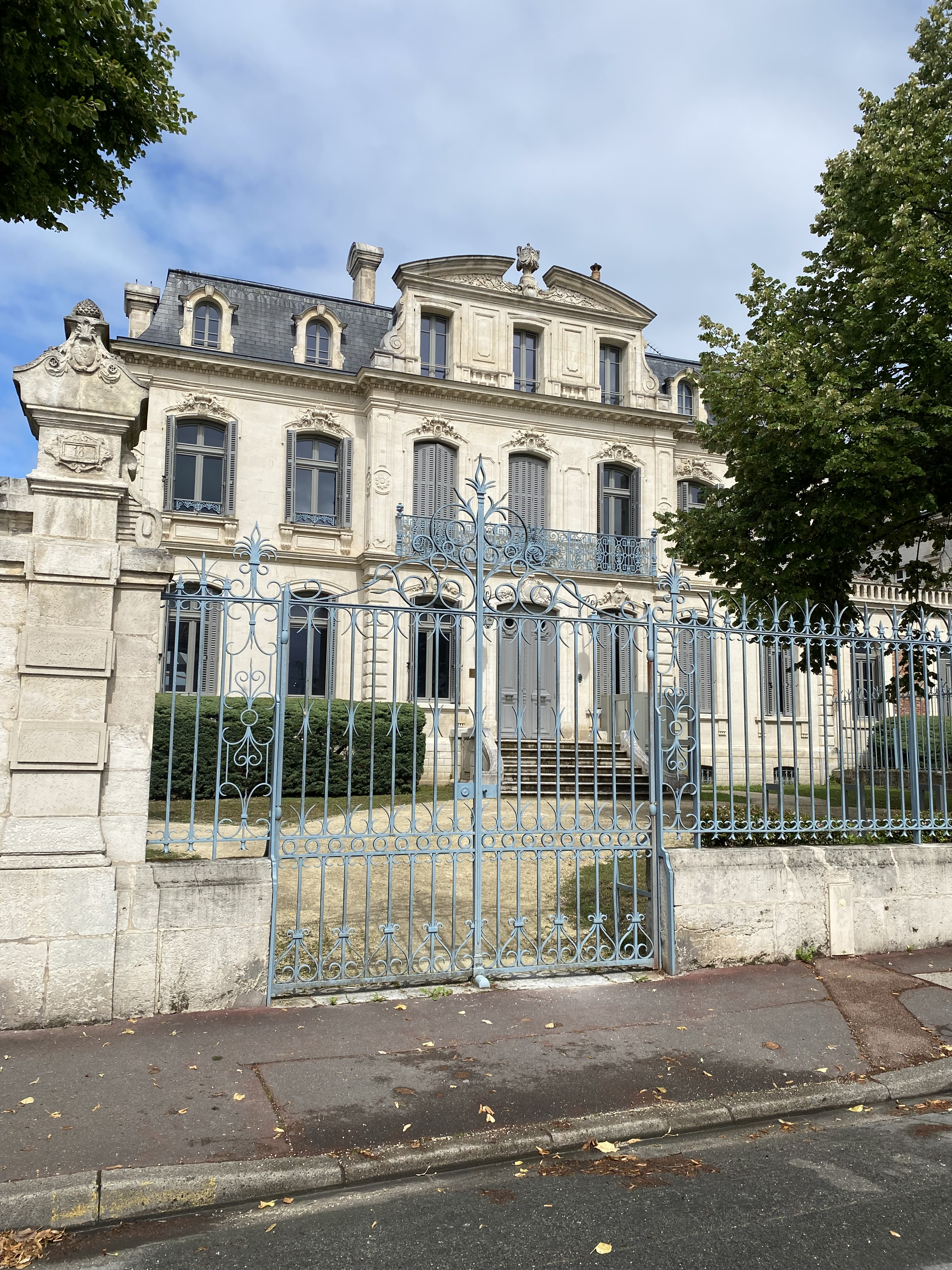
Former mansion, street view

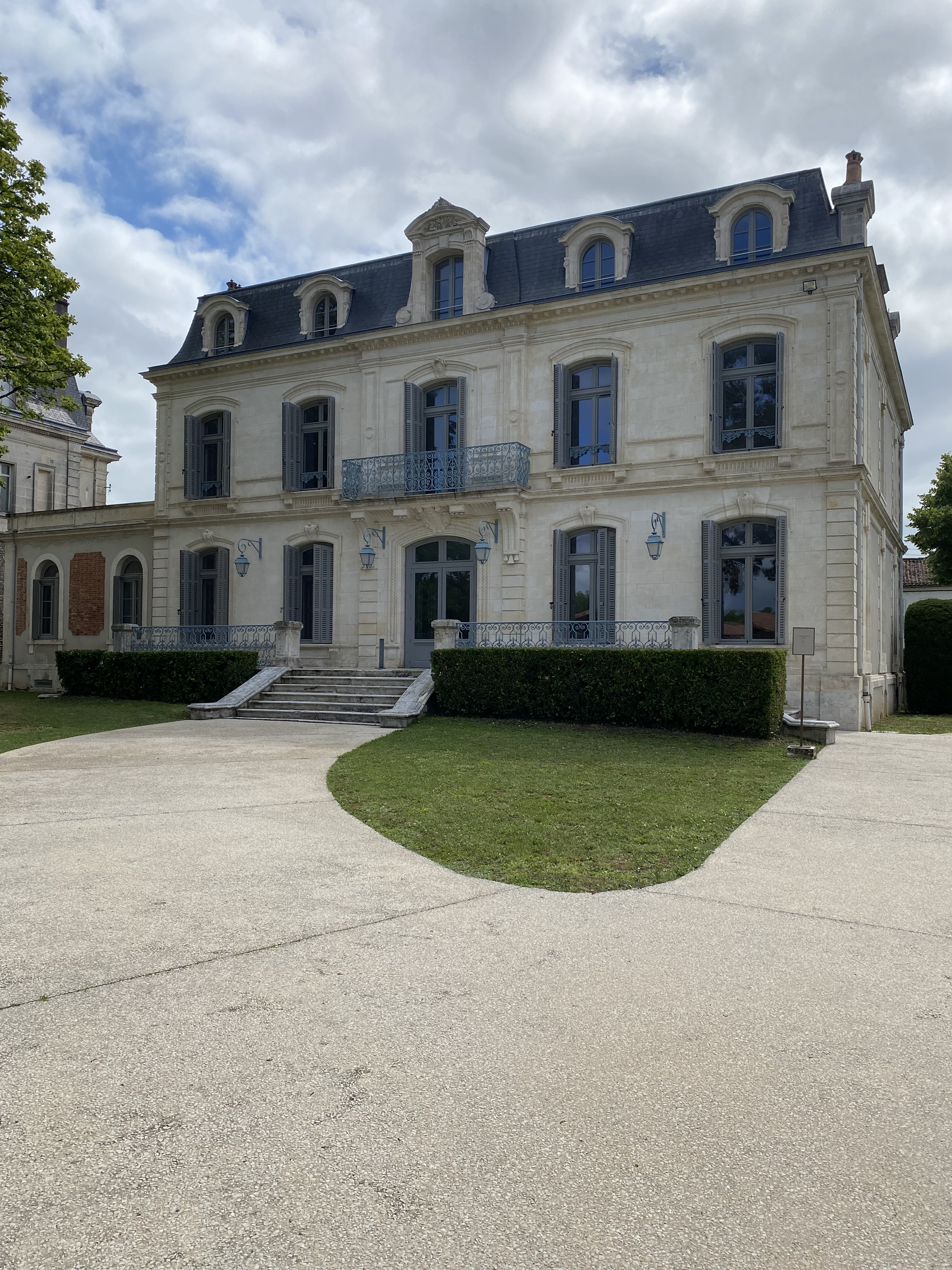
Former mansion, rear view

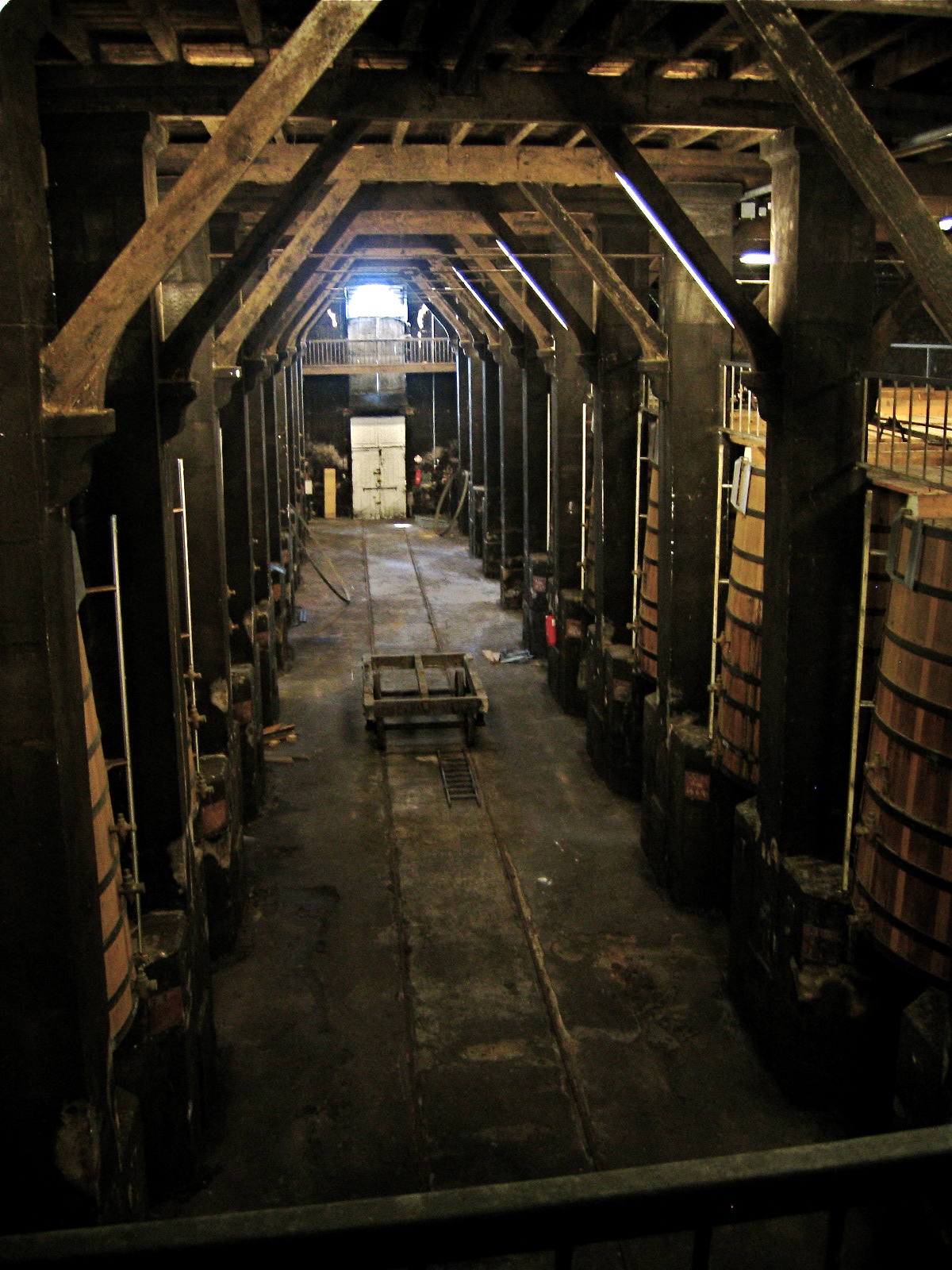
"Chai-cathédrale" in 2006

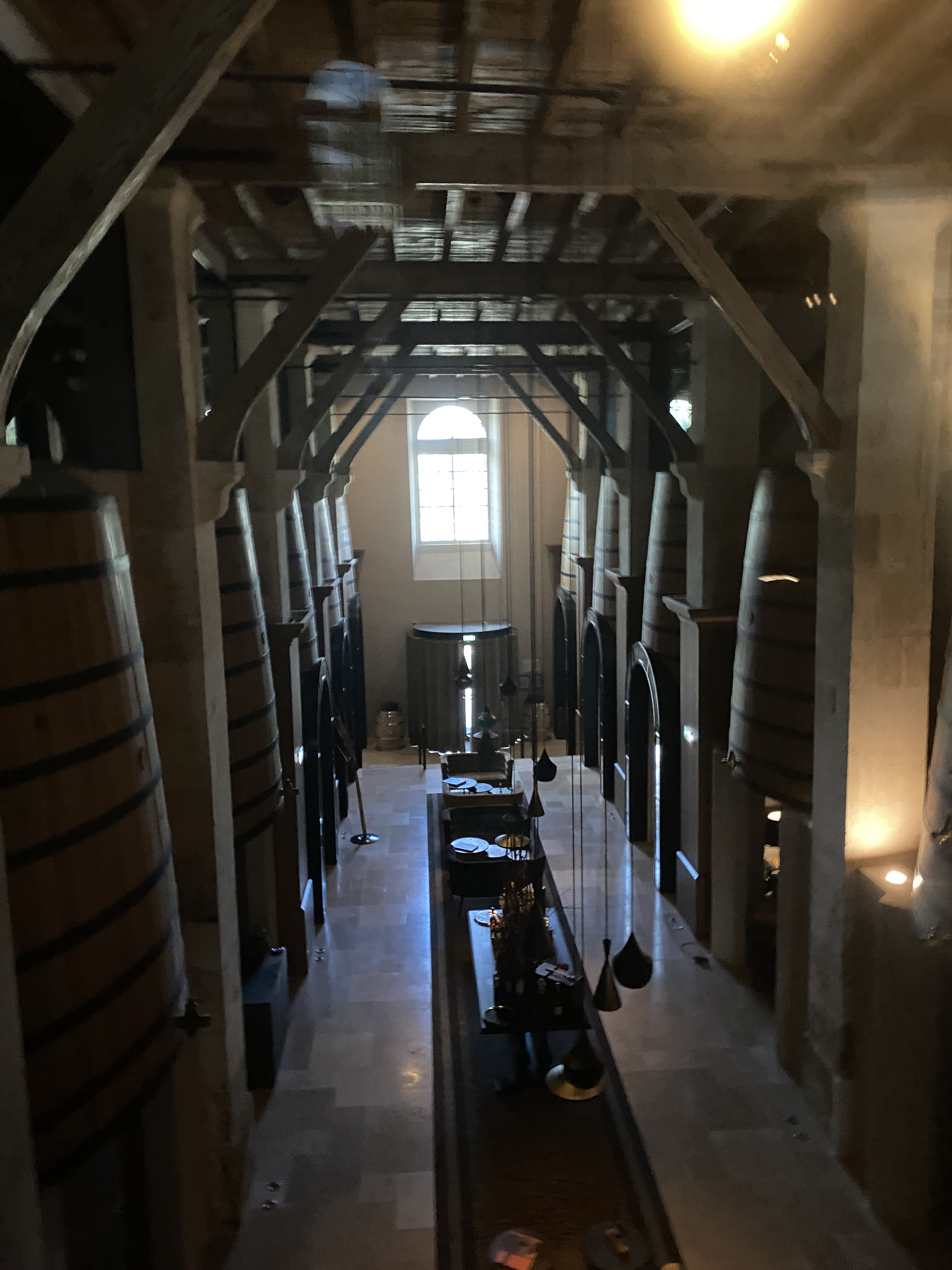
The same space in 2021, now Restaurant Les Foudres

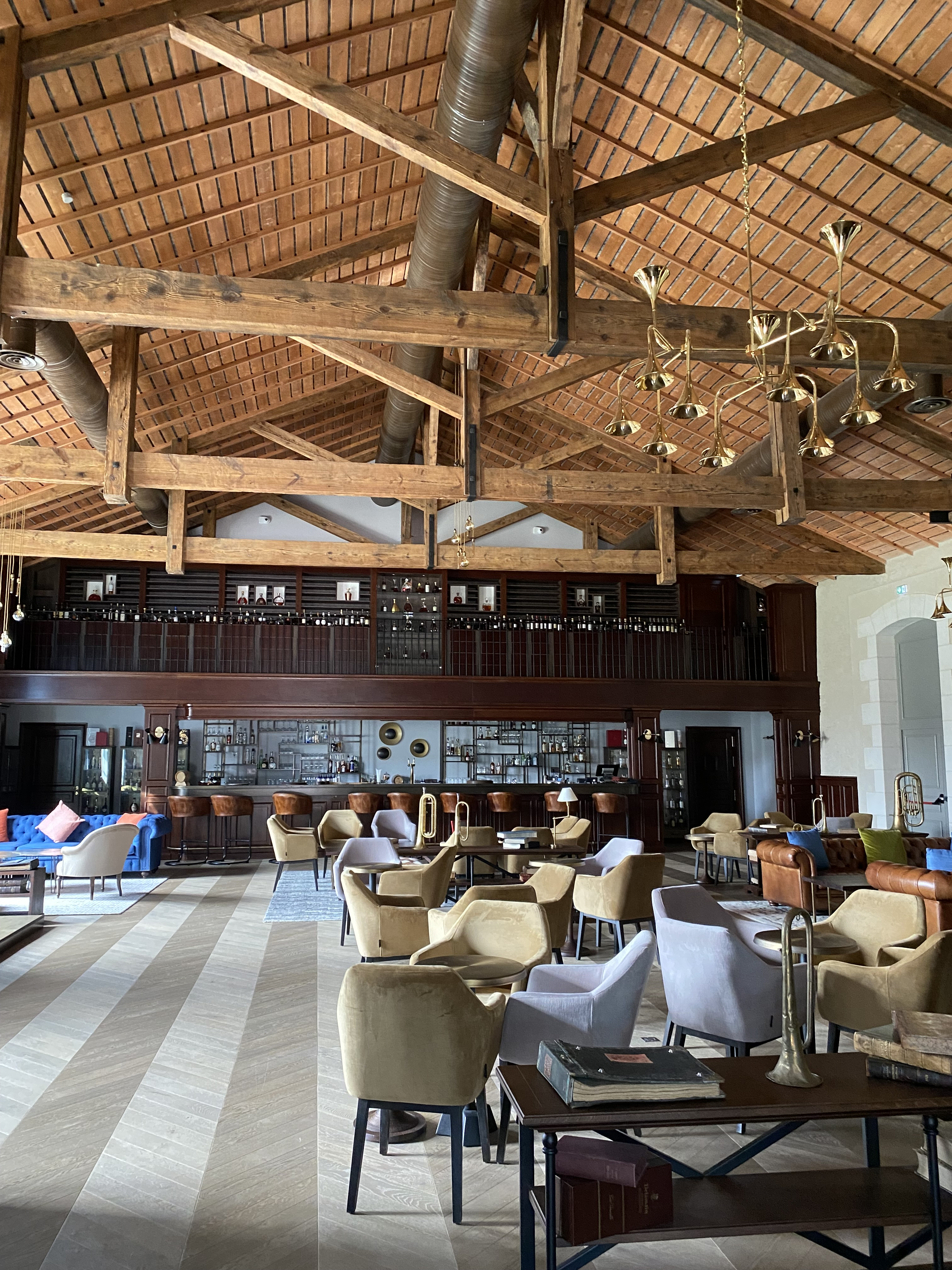
A chai converted into hotel bar

== See also ==
- Jean Monnet House
