= Richard Mayne (administrator) =

British journalist

Richard John Mayne (2 April 1926 – 29 November 2009) was a British journalist, broadcaster, writer and advocate for closer European integration.

Mayne was born in North London and educated at St Paul's School in London. Towards the end of the war, because of his linguistic abilities, he was chosen for the Special Operations Executive (SOE), but spent most of his time in the armed forces with a signals unit. In 1947, he went up to Trinity College, Cambridge, where he read History, gaining a starred first-class degree. In 1953, having gained a Leverhulme grant, he began work on his PhD, which involved a period working in the Vatican Library. From Rome, he began to write for the New Statesman and The Spectator.

Mayne joined the High Authority of the European Coal and Steel Community in Luxembourg in 1956 and became an adviser to Jean Monnet, and then to Walter Hallstein, first President of the European Commission (1958–63). He succeeded François Duchêne as director of the Action Committee for the United States of Europe in 1963, and served as Monnet's personal assistant. He later translated Monnet's memoirs into English (Doubleday, 1978), for which he won the Scott Moncrieff Prize in 1979. Several associates of Monnet believed Mayne's translation captured "Monnet's voice" better than the French original, which was drafted by François Fontaine.

Mayne became the European Commission's chief representative in the United Kingdom in 1969 (Head of the London office, 1973–76) and was involved in the campaign for continued membership of the European Economic Community (EEC) during the UK's 1975 referendum. He stepped down from working for the Commission in London when his outlook towards Europe clashed increasingly with that of Margaret Thatcher, following her government's election to power in 1979.

From 1966, he was the Paris correspondent for Encounter, later writing a personal column for the magazine. Mayne also contributed to The Sunday Times and The Observer.

Among Mayne's publications were The Community of Europe (1962), The Institutions of the European Community (1968), The Recovery of Europe (1970), The Europeans (1972), Postwar: The Dawn of Today's Europe (1983) and Federal Union: The Pioneers (1990).
