= Conflict economics =

Resource reallocation through war

Conflict economics is a branch of economics that puts the allocation of resources by means of violent fighting, i.e. conflict, into economic models.

In traditional economics, appropriation is a non-violent process that is guaranteed by perfect property rights and their costless enforcement. Conflict economics sheds a different light on appropriation. It is set in a model of contest between two players. Conflict economics introduces the idea that agents have to decide between production of resources and production of guns, i.e. tools that have the sole purposes of appropriating the resources produced by the other player. Different models are introduced to illustrate various situations that have similarities to real life conflicts.

== Resource conflict model ==
Two parties contest a given resource Z. The player who wins the contest claims the entire resource, not leaving anything for the losing party. The probabilities of winning are determined by each party’s choice of guns.

== Guns vs. butter model ==
In this model, agents face a trade-off between producing themselves and grabbing the output of the other agent. Each party is endowed with a secure resource R. The resource cannot be consumed directly but has to be allocated between producing guns (tools for conflict) or butter (consumption). Again, the probability of winning the contest and grabbing the other output depend on the relative numbers of guns produced. This model allows testing of different power structures between the players. One of the interesting outcomes is that if one agent has higher productivity, i.e. if he uses one unit of the resource he will gain more butter than his opponent would, he will receive a relatively lower expected pay-off. This is due to the fact that each player will then exploit his or her comparative advantage, with the more productive player producing more butter and the less productive player producing more guns, resulting in a higher chance of winning the conflict thus leading to a higher expected pay-off.

== Settlement in the shadow of conflict ==
Conflict is not the only way that parties can appropriate resources. Depending on the risk preferences of the agents, a simple division of the contested resource according to a settlement can be envisioned. A two-stage game serves to illustrate this. In the first stage, parties make their gun choices. In the second stage, negotiations take place. If the negotiations are successful, the players agree on a division and share the good.

If the negotiations are not successful, conflict ensues with the winning party again taking the whole resource. This two-stage model is especially interesting if one includes the possibility of destruction into the model, i.e. in case of conflict the winner is left with only a part of the contested resource. Parties might prefer settlement over conflict if they have an aversion to uncertainty (outcome of conflict dependent on probabilities) or destruction.

However, in the long term conflict might be the dominant strategy. Introducing a discount rate for payoffs in the future might induce players to start conflict in the present. Defeating your opponent in the present will secure the resource for you in the future (opponent is eliminated), thus not having to share it in a settlement.

== Conflict, alliances and group structures ==
Conflict might not occur between two agents only, but a number of agents can be involved in hostilities. Individuals and parties have been repeatedly proven to form alliances to achieve a common goal. There are cost advantages to be realized or the sum of individual efforts creates synergies that cannot be realized by individuals on their own. However one has to keep in mind that if individuals work together there are always incentives for "free riding." In conflict economics, group conflict builds upon the resource conflict model. A two-stage game is constructed. In the first stage (inter-group conflict) groups and individuals compete for the resource. The probabilities of winning depend on the effort, i.e. number of guns, that individuals are contributing to the group. In the second stage (intra-group conflict) the successful group allocates the won resource among its members. This allocation can be according to the efforts that individuals spent, contracts or just an equal distribution according to the number of members.

However group structures have been found to be more unstable the higher the number of individuals there are in the group. Individuals have higher expected payoff by switching to a group with less individuals or forming a stand-alone alliance. For alliances to be stable they have to be roughly the same sizes or symmetric.

== See also ==
- Peace economics
