= Jurgen Brauer =

German-American economist

Jurgen Brauer (born February 19, 1957) is a retired German-American economist and contributor to the growing field of peace economics, the study of economic aspects of peace and security. He is Emeritus Professor of Economics at Augusta University, Augusta, GA, USA, and Visiting Professor of Economics at Chulalongkorn University, Bangkok, Thailand.

== Academic career ==
Brauer was a U.S. Institute of Peace Scholar for the academic year 1988-89. He earned a Ph.D. degree in economics in 1989 from the University of Notre Dame, Indiana, USA, with a thesis on "Military Expenditures, Arms Production, and the Economic Performance of Developing Nations." From 1991 to 2017, he held a professorship at the business school of then-Augusta College in Augusta, Georgia, now Augusta University. He held visiting professorships and fellowships at the Nelson Mandela Metropolitan University (Port Elizabeth, South Africa), the Australian Defence Force Academy (Canberra, Australia), the University of Colorado, Boulder, CO, Chulalongkorn University (Bangkok, Thailand), the Universidad del Rosario (Bogotá, Colombia), the Institute for Economics and Peace (Sydney, Australia), and the University of Barcelona (Spain).

From 1998 to 2005 Brauer served as vice-chair of Economists for Peace and Security, an international association of professional economists concerned with issues of peace and security. In 2006 he co-founded (with Prof. J. Paul Dunne) The Economics of Peace and Security Journal, which he co-edited until 2020. Also until 2020, he co-edited (with Prof. Keith Hartley) the Routledge Studies in Defence and Peace Economics monograph series, and he served on the editorial boards of several international, peer-reviewed journals, including Defence and Peace Economics. He was Research Affiliate at the National Centre for Peace and Conflict Studies at the University of Otago, New Zealand and also with the Households in Conflict Network. Previously, he was Research Associate in Policy Research in International Services and Manufacturing at the University of Cape Town and served on the Research Committee of the Institute for Economics and Peace (Sydney, Australia). In 2015, he was inducted into the Martin Luther King Jr. Collegium of Scholars at Morehouse College, Atlanta, GA.

== Research and writings ==
Brauer's work during the 1990s and into the mid-2000s focused on conventional aspects of defense and conflict economics such as issues related to disarmament, military expenditure, arms production, arms trade, and arms trade offset agreements, usually but not exclusively in the context of developing countries. As from the mid-2000s, Brauer's work increasingly focused on peace economics and economic aspects of small arms generally and firearms in particular. In 2009, for example, Brauer and John T. Marlin developed a methodology to estimate the economic value of worldwide peace and in 2012, he and J. Paul Dunne published a textbook on macroeconomic aspects of peace economics for the U.S. Institute of Peace. Brauer's work on firearms first culminated in 2013 in a major, 100-page-long study on the U.S. civilian firearms industry published by the Small Arms Survey, Geneva. His research on arms, and the methodology he developed to estimate firearms sales in the United States, has been used by newspapers and others in the debate on firearms proliferation in the US and beyond. It also served as the springboard to co-found a politically neutral consultancy, Small Arms Analytics & Forecasting, of which Brauer served as Senior Partner and Chief Economist until 2022. During the late 2000s, Brauer turned to larger themes: Castles, Battles, and Bombs (2008) is an economic interpretation of the second millennium of military history (written with military historian Hubert van Tuyll) and War and Nature (2009) explores the effects of war on the natural environment. In the early 2010s Brauer began work with Prof. Charles H. Anderton of the College of the Holy Cross exploring economic aspects of the prevention of genocides and other mass atrocities.

== Books (selected) ==
- Brauer, J. & Chatterji, M. eds. (1993). Economic Issues of Disarmament. New York: New York University Press and London: Macmillan Press. ISBN 9780814714690
- Brauer, J. & Gissy, W. eds. (1997). Economics of Conflict and Peace. Aldershot, UK: Avebury Press. ISBN 9781859722374
- Brauer, J. & Hartley, K. eds. (2000). The Economics of Regional Security: NATO, the Mediterranean, and Southern Africa. Amsterdam: Harwood Academic Publishers. (Paperback: 2015.) ISBN 9781138012257
- Brauer, J. & Dunne, J. P. eds. (2002). Arming the South: The Economics of Military Expenditure, Arms Production, and Arms Trade in Developing Countries. New York: Palgrave. ISBN 9780333754405
- Brauer, J. & Dunne, J.P. eds. (2004). Arms Trade and Economic Development: Theory, Policy, and Cases in Arms Trade Offsets. London: Routledge. (Paperback: 2011.) ISBN 9780415331067
- Brauer, J. & Van Tuyll, H. (2008). Castles, Battles, and Bombs: How Economics Explains Military History. Chicago, IL: The University of Chicago Press. (Paperback: 2009; Korean translation: 2013; Russian translation: 2016.) ISBN 9780226071640
- Brauer, J. (2009). War and Nature: The Environmental Consequences of War in a Globalized World. Lanham, MD: Alta Mira Press. (Paperback: 2011.) ISBN 9780759112070
- Brauer, J. & Dunne, J.P. (2012). Peace Economics: A Macroeconomic Primer for Violence-Afflicted States. Washington, D.C.: United States Institute of Peace Press. ISBN 9781601271389
- Anderton, C.H. & Brauer, J. (2016). Economics Aspects of Genocides, Other Mass Atrocities, and their Prevention. New York: Oxford University Press. ISBN 9780199378296
- Silwal, S.B., Anderton, C.H., Brauer, J., Coyne, C.J., Dunne, J.P. (2021). The Economics of Conflict and Peace: History and Applications. New York: Cambridge University Press. ISBN 9781108926249

== Research papers (selected) ==
- Brauer, J (1991). "Military Investments and Economic Growth in Developing Nations". Economic Development and Cultural Change. 39 (4): 873–884. doi:10.1086/451913. S2CID 153372048.
- Brauer, J.; Tepper Marlin, J. (1992). "Converting Resources from Military to Non-military Uses". Journal of Economic Perspectives. 6 (4): 145–164. doi:10.1257/jep.6.4.145.
- Brauer, J (1995). "U.S. Military-Nuclear Materials Production Sites: Do They Attract or Repel Jobs? (Some Suggestive Evidence)". Medicine & Global Survival. 2 (1): 35–44.
- Brauer, J (1996). "Military Expenditures and Human Development Measures". Public Budgeting and Financial Management. 8 (1): 106–124. doi:10.1108/JPBAFM-08-01-1996-B006.
- Brauer, J (1999). "An Economic Perspective on Mercenaries, Military Companies, and the Privatisation of Force". Cambridge Review of International Affairs. 13 (1): 130–146. doi:10.1080/09557579908400278.
- Brauer, J (2000). "Potential and Actual Arms Production: Implications for the Arms Trade Debate". Defence and Peace Economics. 11 (3): 461–480. doi:10.1080/10430710008404961. S2CID 154434050.
- Brauer, J.; Roux, A. (2000). "Peace as an International Public Good: An Application to Southern Africa". Defence and Peace Economics. 11 (4): 643–659. doi:10.1080/10430710008404971. S2CID 154273255.
- Brauer, J.; Gomez-Sorzano, A.; Sethuraman, S. (2004). "Decomposing Violence: Political Murder in Colombia, 1946-1999". European Journal of Political Economy. 20 (2): 447–461. doi:10.1016/s0176-2680(04)00019-9.
- Brauer, J.; Muggah, R. (2006). "Completing the Circle: Building a Theory of Small Arms Demand". Contemporary Security Policy. 27 (1): 138–154. doi:10.1080/13523260600603279. S2CID 56366090.
- Brauer, J (2007). "Data, Models, Coefficients: United States Military Expenditure". Conflict Management and Peace Science. 24 (1): 55–64. doi:10.1080/07388940601102845. S2CID 153427244.
- Markowski, S.; Koorey, S.; Hall, P.; Brauer, J. (2009). "Multi-Channel Supply Chain for Illicit Small Arms". Defence and Peace Economics. 20 (3): 171–191. doi:10.1080/10242690802030903. S2CID 153477794.
- Brauer, J.; Dunne, J.P. (2012). "Terrorism, War, and Global Air Traffic". The Economics of Peace and Security Journal. 7 (1): 22–29. doi:10.15355/epsj.7.1.22.
- Brauer, J.; Montolio, D.; Trujillo-Baute, E. (2016). "How do U.S. State Firearms Laws Affect Firearms Manufacturing Location? An Empirical Investigation, 1986-2010". Journal of Economic Geography lbw016. doi:10.1093/jeg/lbw016. hdl:2445/115668.
- Anderton, C.H.; Brauer, J. (2019). "The Onset, Spread, and Prevention of Mass Atrocities: Perspectives from Formal Network Models". Journal of Genocide Research. 21 (4): 481–503. doi:10.1080/14623528.2019.1632562. S2CID 158570560.
- Anderton, C.H.; Brauer, J. (2021). "Mass Atrocities and their Prevention" (PDF). Journal of Economic Literature. 59 (4): 1240–1292. doi:10.1257/jel.20201458. S2CID 159382743.
