= Pierre Uri =

French economist and public servant

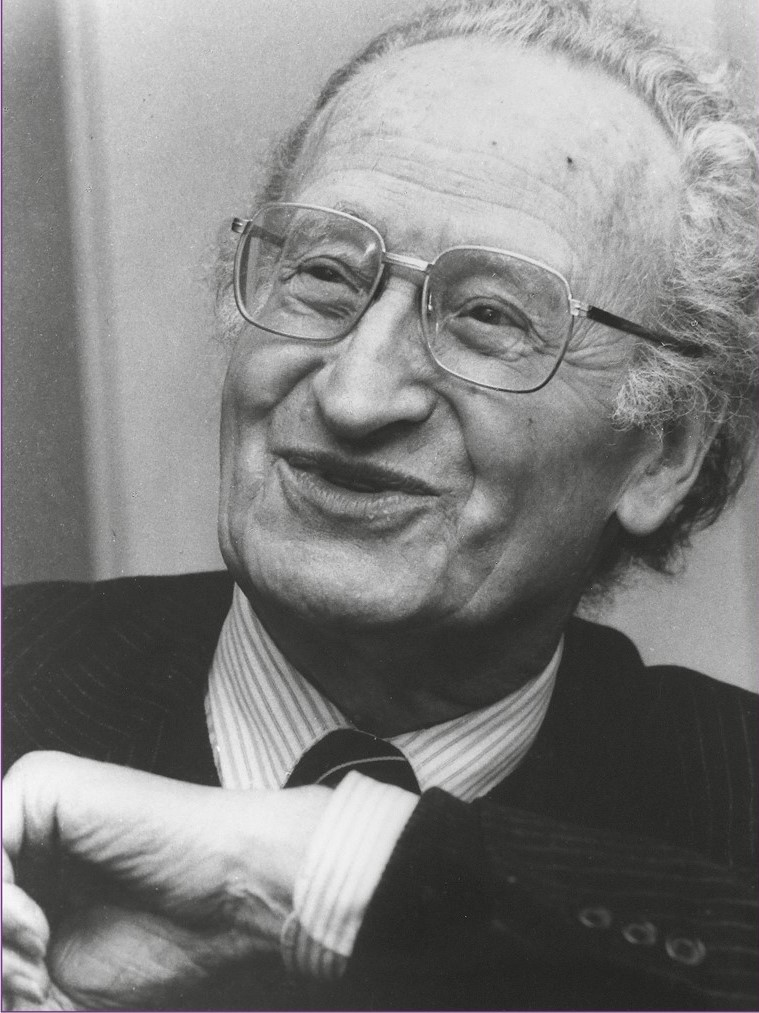
- Pierre Uri in 1980
- Born: 20 November 1911; Paris, France
- Died: 21 July 1992 (aged 80); Paris, France
- Occupations: Economist, public servant, author
- Awards: Grand Croix of the National Order of Merit

Pierre Emmanuel Uri (20 November 1911 – 21 July 1992) was a French economist, public servant and writer. He was one of the architects of the European Coal and Steel Community and the European Economic Community.

== Early life and education ==
Uri was born in Paris on 20 November 1911. His father was secretary of the faculty of letters. He was educated at the Lycée Henri-IV, the École Normale Supérieure, the law faculty of Paris, and later studied at Princeton University. From 1936 Uri taught philosophy at Reims, but in 1940 the anti-Jewish laws of Vichy deprived him of his post, prompting his turn to economics.

== Career ==
After World War II, Uri gained recognition through articles in Les Temps modernes and as professor of economics at the National School of Public Administration. In 1947, Jean Monnet recruited him to the French Planning Commissariat to assist in post-war reconstruction. He helped draft the 1947 national economic "balance-sheet" and later contributed to the Treaty of Paris (1951), establishing the European Coal and Steel Community, where he served as Economic Director.

Uri was a strong federalist and advocate of a wider European market. With Paul-Henri Spaak and Robert Triffin, he co-authored the Spaak Report. This report acted as the blueprint for the Treaty of Rome (1957), which created the European Economic Community. Uri subsequently joined Monnet’s Action Committee for the United States of Europe and advised the European Commission. Between 1959 and 1961, he was a director of Lehman Brothers.

Uri remained engaged in public debate as a columnist for Le Monde, publishing works on European integration, education, and development, including a study on agriculture titled Helping the Third World to Feed Itself. He also played an active role in rebuilding France’s non-Communist left and later advised François Mitterrand on economic policy.

== Later life and death ==
In 1991, President Mitterrand awarded Uri the Grand Croix of the National Order of Merit, calling him "a founder of Europe." He died of cancer in Paris on 21 July 1992, aged 80, and was survived by his wife and four children.
