= François Duchêne =

Louis-François Duchêne (17 February 1927 London – 12 July 2005) was British-born journalist of Swiss-French origin. Duchêne was apolitical analyst of European integration who wrote for The Economist and was professor emeritus at the University of Sussex. He was influenced by his work with Jean Monnet, from 1953 to 1955 at the European Coal and Steel Community in Luxembourg and later from 1958 to 1962 at Monnet's Action Committee for the United States of Europe in Paris. He was director of the International Institute for Strategic Studies from 1969 to 1974. He wrote an authoritative biography of Monnet titled Jean Monnet: The First Statesman of Interdependence (W. W. Norton & Company, 1994).
