= François Fontaine =

French civil servant and writer (1917-1996)

- Born: 20 December 1917
- Died: 23 March 1996 (aged 78)
- Occupation: Writer

François Fontaine (20 December 1917 – 23 March 1996) was a French civil servant and writer.

Fontaine was long associated with Jean Monnet, with whom he started working in 1945 at the Commissariat général du Plan, and with the early build-up of European institutions. In the early 1970s while working at the European Economic Community office in Paris, he drafted most of the text of Monnet's Memoirs published by Fayard in 1976, even as Monnet himself retained ultimate control. The English translation by Richard Mayne was published by Doubleday in 1978.

After Monnet's Memoirs were published, Fontaine moved on to writing successful historical novels. He won the Prix Méditerranee in 1987 for his book Blandine de Lyon.

His son Pascal (born 1948) also worked with Monnet on historical research in the early 1970s and was involved in the preparation of the Memoirs as well. He later wrote a biography of Monnet on his own, published in 1988 as L'Inspirateur and in an expanded version in 2013 as Jean Monnet, Actualité d'un bâtisseur de l'Europe unie.
