= Étienne Hirsch =

French civil engineer (1901–1994)

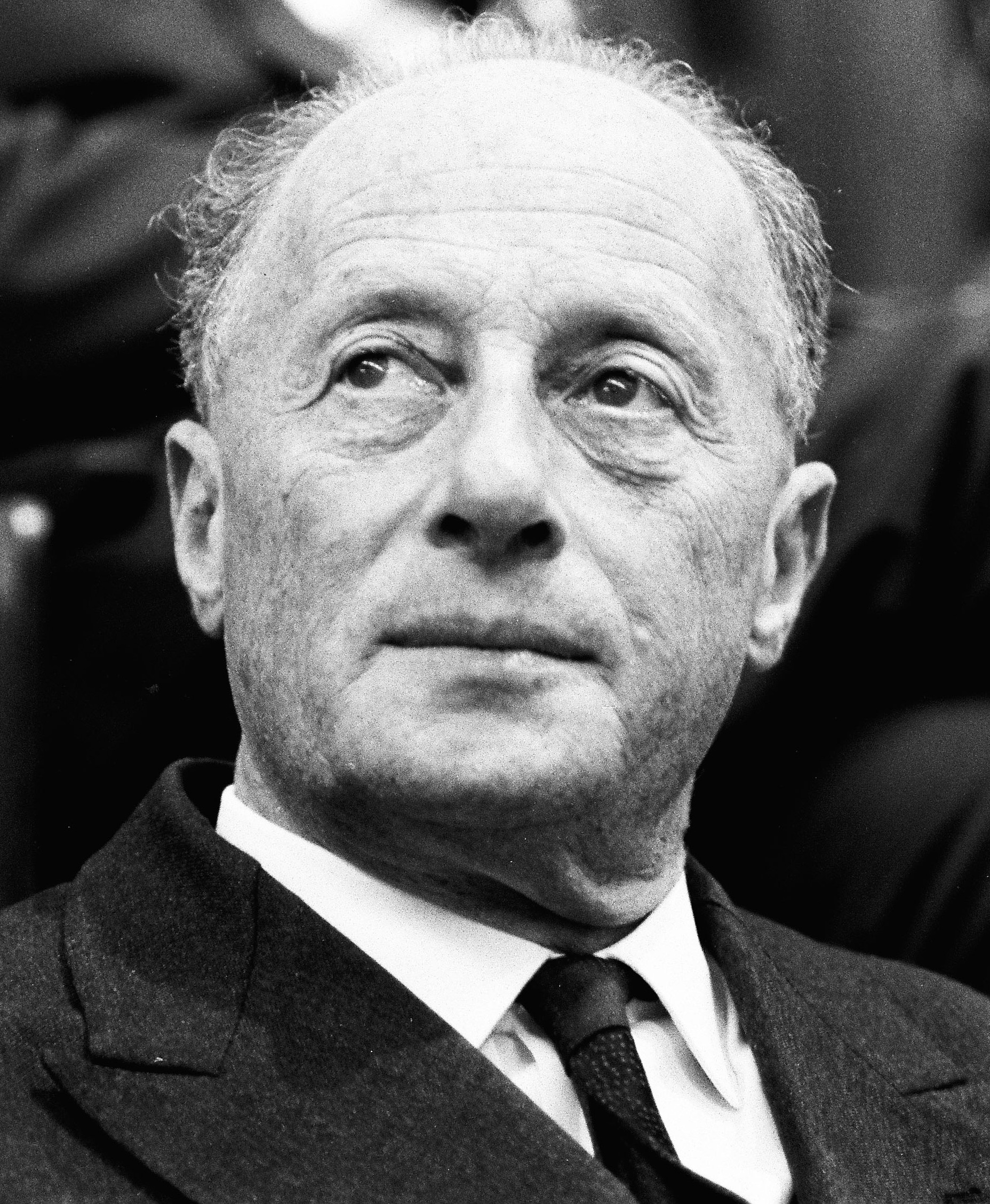
- Born: 20 January 1901; Paris, French Third Republic
- Died: 17 May 1994 (aged 93); Paris, (France) French Fourth Republic
- Education: École des Mines de Paris
- Occupation: Engineer
- Relatives: Martin Hirsch (grandson)

Étienne Hirsch (20 January 1901 – 17 May 1994) was a French civil engineer and a member of the French Resistance during World War II. He served as President of the Commission of the European Atomic Energy Community between 1959 and 1962 (see Hirsch Commission).

== Life and career ==
Étienne Hirsch was born in 1901 in a Jewish family of German and Bohemian descent. He was the son of Richard and Marianne Hirsch (née Schwenk), deported by Convoy 77 in July 1944, and the brother of Madeleine Melese (née Hirsch), and Juliette Lévy (née Hirsch) deported with her children Michèle, Jean-Paul, Alain and Catherine by Convoy 35 in September 1942. His parents and sister Juliette were assassinated in Auschwitz.

After France's defeat in the Battle of France during World War II, he immediately joined Charles de Gaulle in London and became an officer in the Free French Forces under the name of Commandant Bernard. General de Gaulle put Hirsch in charge of supplying arms to the French Resistance forces on the Continent. In 1943, he became a close associate with Jean Monnet in the French Committee of National Liberation in Algiers. After the liberation of France, he directed a program to modernize the French economy. He served later as an administrator of the European Coal and Steel Community. In 1959, Hirsch became the chairman of the European Atomic Energy Community.

== See also ==
- Hirsch Commission

== Bibliography ==
- 1988 : Ainsi va la vie, Jean Monnet Foundation for Europe, Lausanne, 250 p.
