= Sicco Mansholt =

Dutch politician and diplomat (1908–1995)

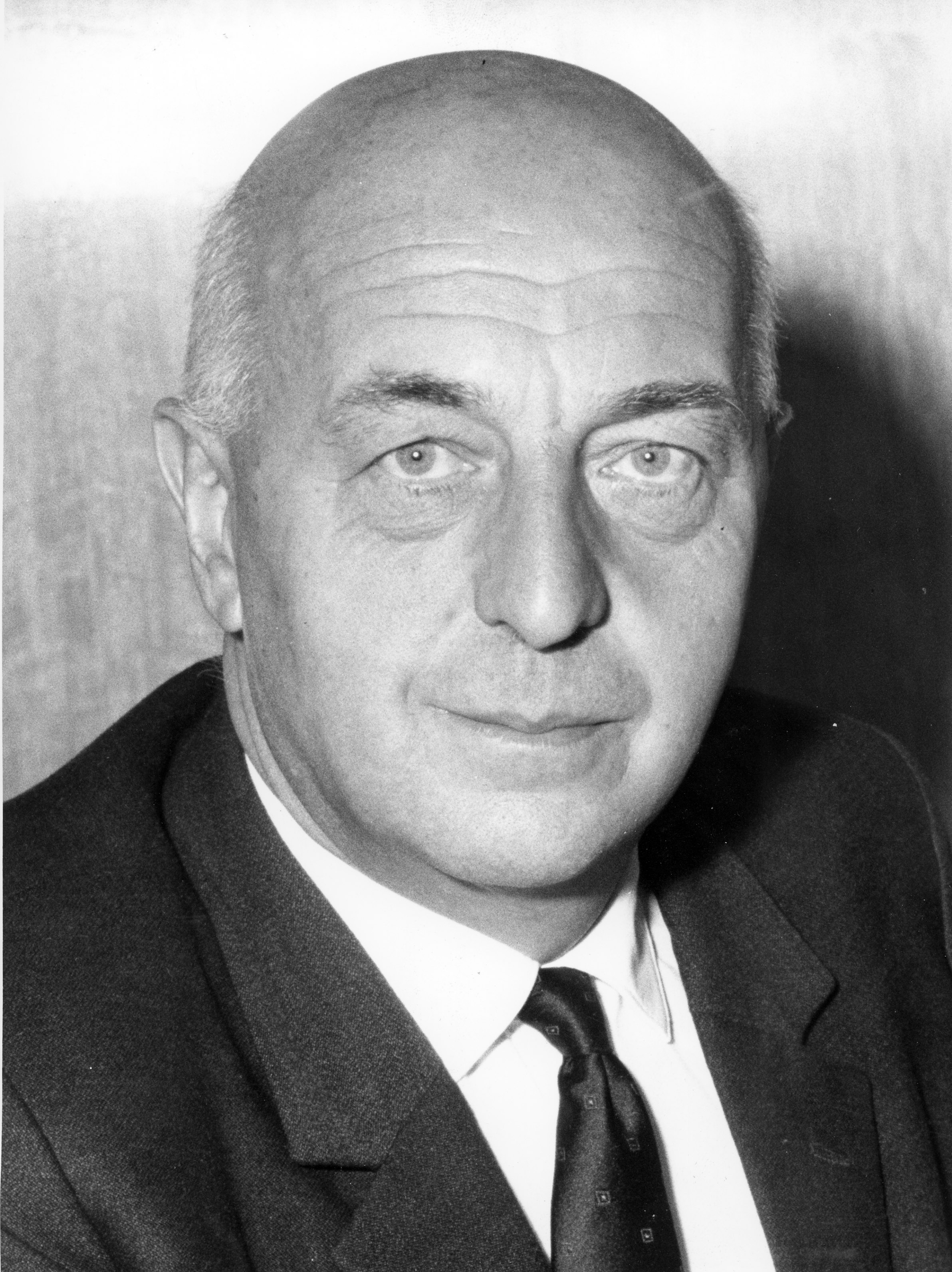
- Mansholt in 1962

President of the European Commission
- In office 22 March 1972 – 5 January 1973
- Vice President: Wilhelm Haferkamp
- Preceded by: Franco Maria Malfatti
- Succeeded by: François-Xavier Ortoli

First Vice-President of the European Commission
- In office 7 January 1958 – 22 March 1972
- President: See list: Walter Hallstein (1958–1967) Jean Rey (1967–1970) Franco Maria Malfatti (1970–1972)
- Preceded by: Office established
- Succeeded by: Wilhelm Haferkamp

European Commissioner for Agriculture
- In office 7 January 1958 – 22 March 1972
- President: See list: Walter Hallstein (1958–1967) Jean Rey (1967–1970) Franco Maria Malfatti (1970–1972)
- Preceded by: Office established
- Succeeded by: Carlo Scarascia-Mugnozza

Minister of Economic Affairs
- In office 14 January 1948 – 20 January 1948; Ad interim
- Prime Minister: Louis Beel
- Preceded by: Gerardus Huysmans
- Succeeded by: Jan van den Brink

Member of the House of Representatives
- In office 3 July 1956 – 3 October 1956
- In office 15 July 1952 – 7 September 1952
- In office 27 July 1948 – 10 August 1948
- In office 4 June 1946 – 18 July 1946
- Parliamentary group: Labour Party

Minister of Agriculture, Fisheries and Food Supplies
- In office 25 June 1945 – 1 January 1958
- Prime Minister: See list: Willem Schermerhorn (1945–1946) Louis Beel (1946–1948) Willem Drees (1948–1958)
- Preceded by: Hans Gispen as Minister of Commerce, Industry and Agriculture; Jim de Booy as Minister of Shipping
- Succeeded by: Kees Staf (ad interim)

Mayor of Wieringermeer
- In office 30 April 1945 – 22 May 1945; Ad interim
- Preceded by: Aris Saal
- Succeeded by: Gerrit Gesenius Loggers

Personal details
- Born: Sicco Leendert Mansholt; 13 September 1908 Ulrum, Netherlands
- Died: 29 June 1995 (aged 86) Wapserveen, Netherlands
- Party: Labour Party (1946–1995)
- Other political affiliations: Social Democratic; Workers' Party (1937–1946)
- Spouse: Henny Postel (m. 1938)
- Children: 2 sons and 2 daughters
- Education: National Higher Agricultural School (Bachelor of Science in Agriculture)
- Occupation: Politician · Diplomat · Civil servant · Agronomist · Farmer · Lobbyist

Sicco Leendert Mansholt (Dutch: [ˈsɪkoː ˈleːndərt ˈmɑnsɦɔlt]; 13 September 1908 – 29 June 1995) was a Dutch farmer, politician and diplomat of the Social Democratic Workers' Party (SDAP) and later the Labour Party (PvdA), who served as the fourth president of the European Commission from 1 March 1972 until 5 January 1973.

Mansholt worked as a farmer in Wieringermeer from 1937 until 1945. In 1940, during World War II, he joined the Dutch resistance against the German occupiers and helped shelter refugees. Following the end of World War II, Mansholt was appointed as acting Mayor of Wieringermeer, serving from 30 April 1945 until 22 May 1945. After the end of the German occupation, Queen Wilhelmina ordered the formation of a Cabinet of National unity to serve as a caretaker government and make preparations for a new election, and Mansholt was appointed as Minister of Agriculture, Fisheries and Food Supplies in the Cabinet Schermerhorn–Drees, taking office on 25 June 1945. Mansholt was elected as a Member of the House of Representatives after the election of 1946, taking office on 4 June 1946. He continued as Minister of Agriculture, Fisheries and Food Supplies in the Cabinet Beel I, taking office on 3 July 1946, then served as acting Minister of Economic Affairs from 14 January 1948 until 20 January 1948 following the resignation of Gerardus Huysmans. After the election of 1948 Mansholt returned as a Member of the House of Representatives on 27 July 1948, and continued as Minister in the Cabinet Drees–Van Schaik, taking office on 7 August 1948. Mansholt served continuously as Minister of Agriculture, Fisheries and Food Supplies in the Drees Cabinets I, II and III, and also served as a Member of the House of Representatives after the elections of 1952 and 1956, serving from 15 July 1952 until 7 September 1952 and from 3 July 1956 until 3 October 1956.

In December 1957, Mansholt was nominated as the first European Commissioner from the Netherlands in the First Hallstein Commission. Lardinois was given the portfolio of Agriculture and was appointed as the first Vice-President of the European Commission. He resigned as Minister of Agriculture, Fisheries and Food Supplies on 1 January 1958 and the First Hallstein Commission was installed on 7 January 1958. Mansholt continued to serve as European Commissioner for Agriculture and vice-president in the Second Hallstein Commission, the Rey Commission and the Malfatti Commission. In February 1972 Mansholt was nominated as the next President of the European Commission. The Mansholt Commission was installed on 1 March 1972 and oversaw the creation of the European Monetary System on 24 April 1972 and the first enlargement on 1 January 1973. The Mansholt Commission was succeeded by the Ortoli Commission on 5 January 1973.

After his retirement, Mansholt occupied numerous seats as a nonprofit director for supervisory boards for several international non-governmental organizations and research institutes (Institute of International Relations Clingendael, European Centre for Development Policy Management, Netherlands Atlantic Association, Transnational Institute, Club of Rome, Humanistic Association, Royal Holland Society of Sciences and Humanities and the Carnegie Foundation) and as an advocate and lobbyist for European integration and humanism. He was known for his abilities as a negotiator and manager. Mansholt continued to comment on political affairs as an elder statesman until his death. He holds the distinction of being the longest-serving Minister of Agriculture, the longest-serving European Commissioner from the Netherlands, the longest-serving European Commissioner for Agriculture and the only Dutchman to have served as President of the European Commission. He is recognized as one of the Founding fathers of the European Union.

== Early life and studies ==
Sicco Leendert Mansholt was born on 13 September 1908 in Ulrum, in the province of Groningen, Netherlands. Mansholt came from a socialist farmer's family in the province of Groningen. Both his father and grandfather were supporters of early socialist leaders such as Multatuli, Domela Nieuwenhuis, and Troelstra. His father, Lambertus H. Mansholt, was a delegate for the socialist SDAP party in the Groningen provincial chamber. His mother, Wabien Andreae, daughter of a judge in Heerenveen, was one of the first women to have studied political science. She organised political meetings for other women, usually in their own homes. Together with two brothers and two sisters, Mansholt was raised at "Huis ter Aa", a grand villa in Glimmen. He attended the HBS school in Groningen and after that went to Deventer, to the School of Tropical Agriculture, where he studied to become a tobacco farmer.

== Agriculture ==
Mansholt moved to Java in the Dutch East Indies (present-day Indonesia), and started work on a tea plantation. He returned to the Netherlands in 1936, unhappy with the colonial system. He wanted to become a farmer and moved to the Wieringermeer, a polder, reclaimed in 1937. There he started his own farm.

Mansholt married Henny J. Postel in 1938, and they had two sons and two daughters. In the years of World War II, he was an active member of the Resistance. He helped people who were in acute danger to hide in the Wieringermeerpolder; he organised clandestine food distributions for the western provinces.

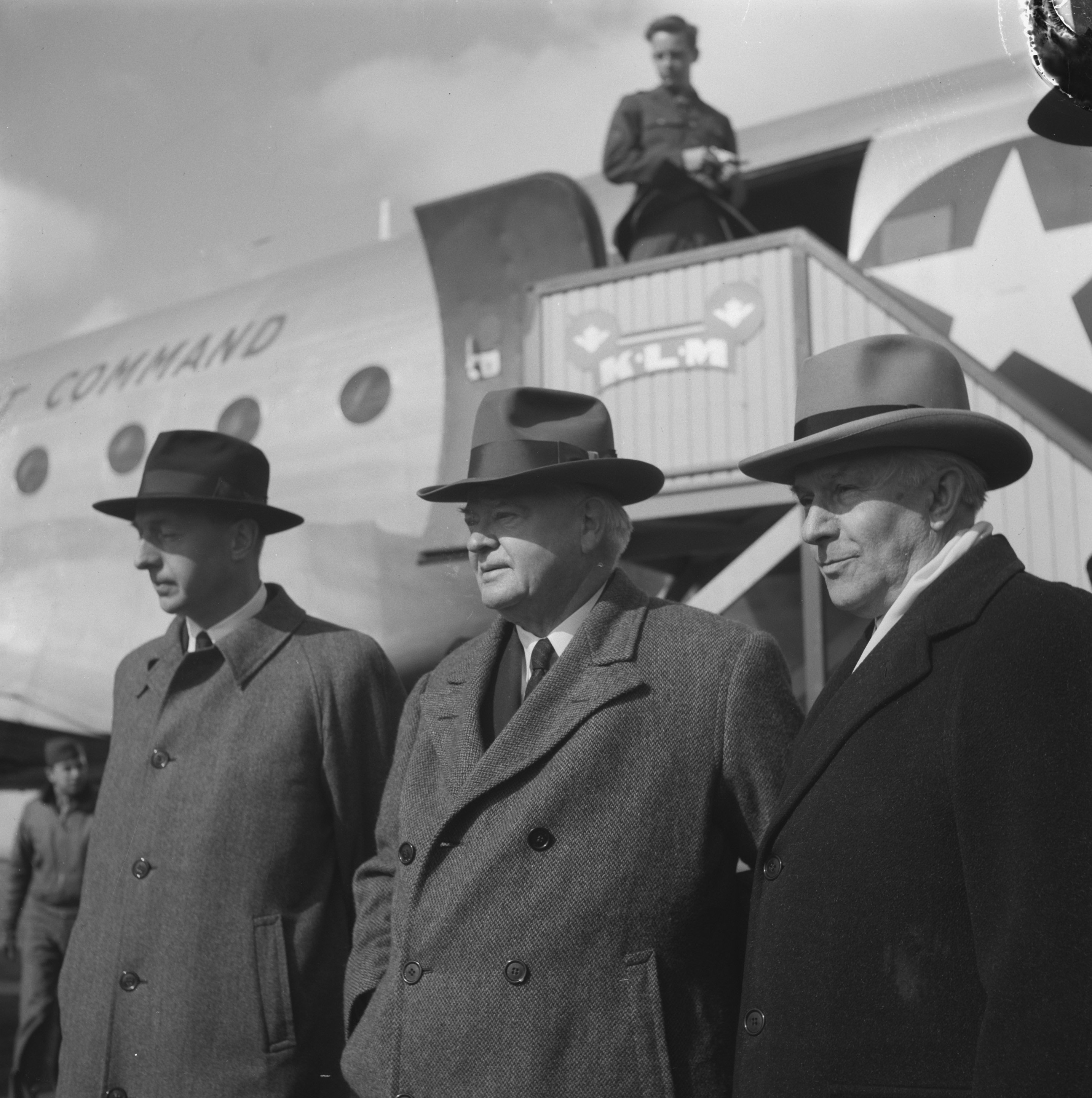
United States Ambassador to the Netherlands Stanley Hornbeck, former President of the United States Herbert Hoover and Minister of Agriculture, Fisheries and Food Supplies Sicco Mansholt at Airport Schiphol on 8 April 1946.

== Politics ==
=== Local politics ===
Mansholt became a member of the Social Democratic Workers' Party (SDAP) in 1937, as a secretary of the local party. He had several public functions for the SDAP in Wieringermeer, including that of acting mayor of the Wieringermeer community.

=== Minister of Agriculture ===
Immediately after the war, in June 1945, Labour Party (PvdA) Prime Minister Schermerhorn asked him to take a seat in his cabinet as minister of Agriculture, Fishery and Food Distribution. He was the youngest member of a cabinet, aged only 36.

Mansholt was a member of six cabinets in total: Schermerhorn-Drees in 1945; Beel in 1946; Drees-Van Schaik in 1948, and the three Drees administrations: 1951, 1952 and 1956. As Minister of Agriculture during this time, he was one of the key architects of the EC's Common Agricultural Policy. In 1954 the parliamentary debate about the budget for the Department of Agriculture was postponed: the Minister was ice-skating the 200-kilometre-long Elfstedentocht in the Dutch province of Friesland, which he skated twice in his life.

=== European Commission ===
In 1958, Mansholt became one of the Commissioners of the new European Commission. He was Commissioner for Agriculture and vice-president of the institution. He modernized European agriculture. The Mansholt Plan was opposed by E. F. Schumacher in his book Small Is Beautiful.

Mansholt became President of the European Commission on 22 March 1972 (the Mansholt Commission) and continued in that position until 5 January 1973. It was around that time he was heavily under the influence of the Club of Rome.

== Life after politics ==
Mansholt published his autobiography De Crisis ("The Crisis") in 1974. He lived his last years in an old historic farm in the quiet village of Wapserveen, where he died on 29 June 1995. His daughter Lideke also died in 1995, aged 53.

== Decorations ==
Military decorations
| Ribbon bar | Decoration | Country | Date |
|---|---|---|---|
| | Resistance Memorial Cross | Netherlands | 30 April 1982 |

Honours
| Ribbon bar | Honour | Country | Date | Comment |
|---|---|---|---|---|
| | Grand Cross of the Order of the Oak Crown | Luxembourg | 8 March 1957 | |
| | Knight Grand Cross of the Order of Orange-Nassau | Netherlands | 22 December 1958 | |
| | Grand Cross of the Order of the Crown | Belgium | 18 October 1968 | |
| | Commander of the Order of Agricultural Merit | France | 15 January 1970 | |
| | Grand Cross of the Order of Merit | Germany | 5 May 1972 | |
| | Knight Grand Cross of the Order of the Netherlands Lion | Netherlands | 18 December 1972 | Elevated from Knight (25 June 1955) |
| | Grand Cross of the Legion of Honour | France | 1 January 1973 | |

== Honorary degrees ==
Honorary degrees
| University | Field | Country | Date | Comment |
|---|---|---|---|---|
| Wageningen University | Agronomy | Netherlands | 9 October 1956 | |

Political offices
| Preceded by Aris Saal | Mayor of Wieringermeer; Ad interim 1945 | Succeeded by Gerrit Gesenius Loggers |
| Preceded by Hans Gispen as Minister of Commerce, Industry and Agriculture | Minister of Agriculture, Fisheries and Food Supplies; 1945–1958 | Succeeded by Kees Staf; Ad interim |
| Preceded by Jim de Booy as Minister of Shipping | Minister of Agriculture, Fisheries and Food Supplies; 1945–1958 | Succeeded by Kees Staf; Ad interim |
| Preceded by Gerardus Huysmans | Minister of Economic Affairs; Ad interim 1948 | Succeeded by Jan van den Brink |
| Preceded by Office established | European Commissioner from the Netherlands; 1958-1973; Served alongside: Maan Sassen (1967–1971) | Succeeded by Pierre Lardinois |
| Preceded by Office established | European Commissioner for Agriculture; 1958–1972 | Succeeded by Carlo Scarascia-Mugnozza |
| Preceded by Office established | First Vice-President of the European Commission; 1958–1972 | Succeeded by Wilhelm Haferkamp |
| Preceded by Franco Maria Malfatti | President of the European Commission; 1972–1973 | Succeeded by François-Xavier Ortoli |
Non-profit organization positions
| Preceded by Office established | Chairman of the Supervisory board of the Humanistic Association; 1984–1989 | Succeeded by Henk Bos |
