= European Commissioner for Sustainable Transport and Tourism =

Member of the EU Commission

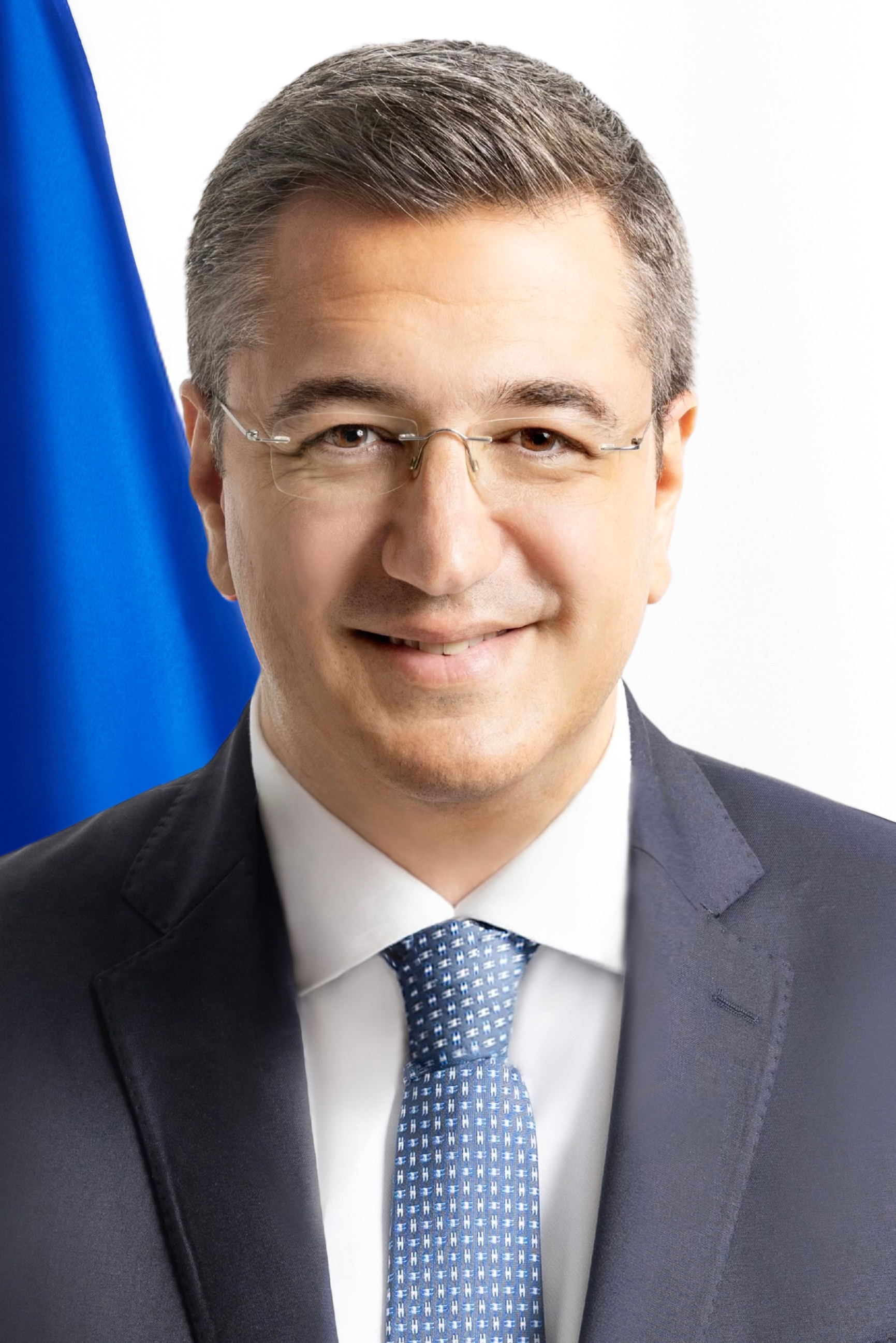
- Incumbent; Apostolos Tzitzikostas since 1 December 2024
- Appointer: President of the European Commission
- Term length: Five years
- Formation: 1958

The European Commissioner for Sustanable Transport and Tourism is a member of the European Commission whose portfolio includes the planning and development of homogeneous transport policies and regulations across the Union, of the Trans-European Transport Network as well as of interoperation, navigation and signalling programs such as the European Rail Traffic Management System, the Galileo positioning system and the Single European Sky.

The current commissioner is Apostolos Tzitzikostas, from Greece.

== Barrot (2004–2008) ==
Commissioner Barrot was approved by the European Parliament in 2004 and made a Vice-President in the Barroso Commission. However shortly after he began work, UKIP MEP Nigel Farage revealed Barrot had previously been convicted of fraud in 2000. French President Jacques Chirac had granted him presidential amnesty. A fact the Commissioner did not disclose during his hearing to the Parliament. Despite calls from some MEPs for him to be suspended he remained in office.

A major project during his term is the Galileo positioning system. Work on the system began a year before Barrot came to office and has developed since with the launch of the first satellite. However infighting within private sector partners may be a potential setback to the project with Barrot favouring greater funds from the EU budget . Other work includes recent guarantees of air passenger rights and the Single European Sky.

== Tajani (2008–2010) ==
Antonio Tajani was Commissioner from 2008 to 2010. Being head of the Forza Italia delegation in Europe, on 8 May 2008 he was appointed by the newly elected Italian prime minister, Silvio Berlusconi, as Italy's EU Commissioner. He replaced Franco Frattini who was appointed Minister of Foreign Affairs.

== List of commissioners ==
#	Name	Country	Period	Commission
1	Michel Rasquin	Luxembourg	1958	Hallstein
2	Lambert Schaus	Luxembourg	1958–1967	Hallstein
3	Victor Bodson	Luxembourg	1967–1970	Rey
4	Albert Coppé	Belgium	1970–1973	Malfatti, Mansholt
5	Carlo Scarascia-Mugnozza	Italy	1973–1977	Ortoli
6	Richard Burke	Ireland	1977–1981	Jenkins
7	Giorgos Kontogeorgis	Greece	1981–1985	Thorn
8	Stanley Clinton Davis	United Kingdom	1985–1988	Delors I
9	Karel Van Miert	Belgium	1989–1992	Delors II
10	Abel Matutes	Spain	1993–1994	Delors III
11	Marcelino Oreja	Spain	1994–1995	Delors III
12	Neil Kinnock	United Kingdom	1995–1999	Santer
13	Loyola de Palacio	Spain	1999–2004	Prodi
14	Jacques Barrot	France	2004–2008	Barroso I
15	Antonio Tajani	Italy	2008–2010	Barroso I
16	Siim Kallas	Estonia	2010–2014	Barroso II
17	Violeta Bulc	Slovenia	2014–2019	Juncker
18	Adina Ioana Vălean	Romania	2019–2024	Von der Leyen I
19	Apostolos Tzitzikostas	Greece	2024–	Von der Leyen II

== See also ==
- Barrot scandal
- Directorate-General for Transport and Energy
- European Driving Licence
- European Rail Traffic Management System
- Galileo positioning system
- Trans-European transport networks
- Transport in the European Union
