= Pierre Lardinois =

Dutch politician and diplomat (1924 -1987)

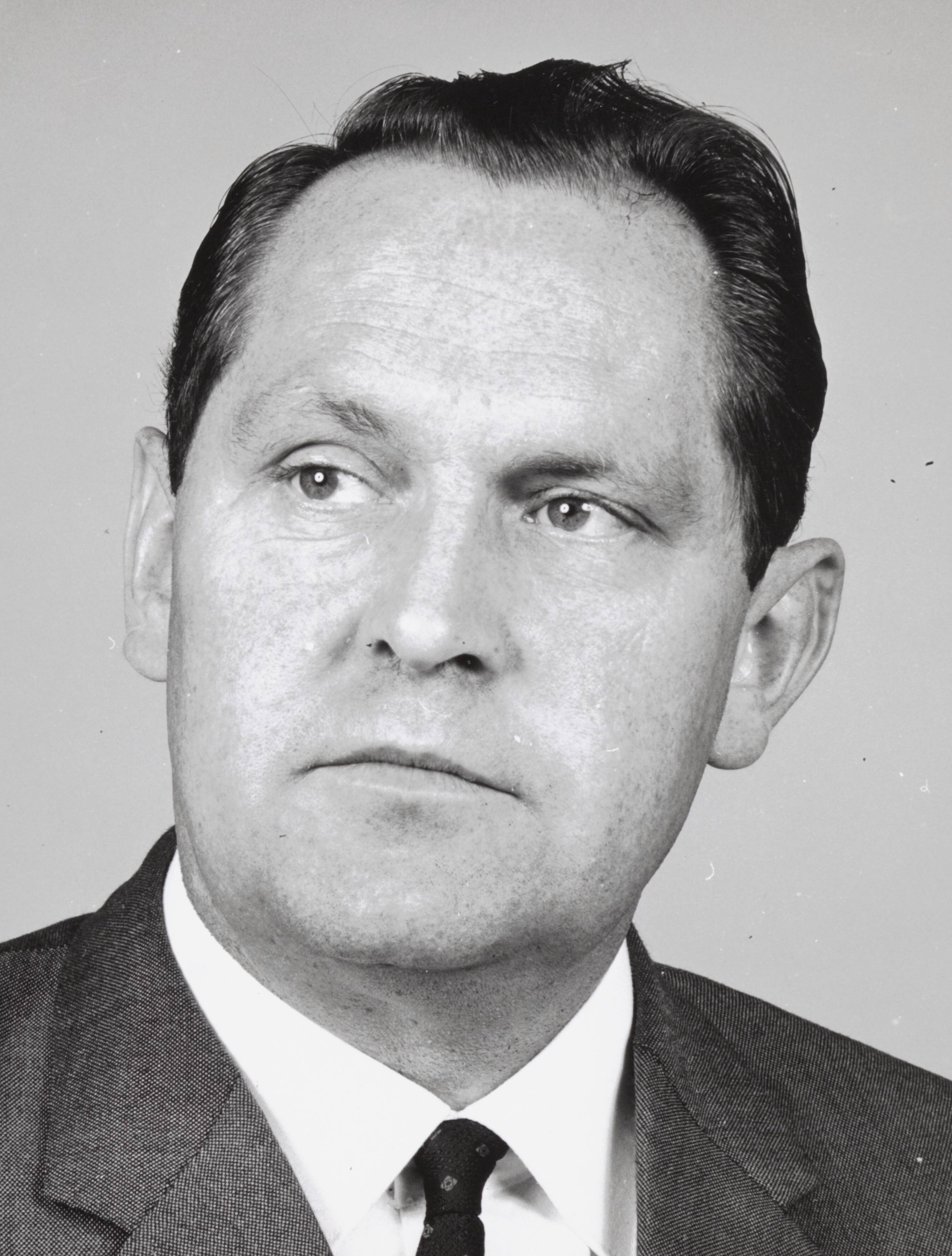
- Lardinois in 1968

European Commissioner for Agriculture and Fisheries
- In office 6 January 1973 – 6 January 1977
- President: François-Xavier Ortoli
- Preceded by: Carlo Scarascia-Mugnozza
- Succeeded by: Finn Olav Gundelach

Minister for Suriname and Netherlands Antilles Affairs
- In office 28 January 1972 – 1 January 1973
- Prime Minister: Barend Biesheuvel
- Preceded by: Roelof Nelissen
- Succeeded by: Molly Geertsema

Minister of Agriculture and Fisheries
- In office 5 April 1967 – 1 January 1973
- Prime Minister: Piet de Jong (1967–1971); Barend Biesheuvel (1971–1973)
- Preceded by: Barend Biesheuvel
- Succeeded by: Jaap Boersma (Ad interim)

Member of the Social and Economic Council
- In office 1 February 1965 – 5 April 1967
- Chairman: Jan de Pous

Member of the European Parliament
- In office 14 October 1963 – 5 April 1967
- Parliamentary group: Christian Democratic Group
- Constituency: Netherlands

Member of the House of Representatives
- In office 11 May 1971 – 6 July 1971
- In office 17 September 1963 – 5 April 1967
- Parliamentary group: Catholic People's Party

Personal details
- Born: Pierre Joseph Lardinois; 13 August 1924 Noorbeek, Netherlands
- Died: 16 July 1987 (aged 62) Amsterdam, Netherlands
- Cause of death: Cancer
- Party: Christian Democratic Appeal (from 1980)
- Other political affiliations: Catholic People's Party (1950–1954, 1958–1980)
- Spouse: Maria Peeters (m. 1950; died 1982)
- Children: 5
- Education: Wageningen Agricultural College (Bachelor of Science in Agriculture, Master of Science in Engineering)
- Occupation: Politician · Diplomat · Civil servant · Agronomist · Agricultural engineer · Businessman · Banker · Corporate director · Trade association executive · Lobbyist

Pierre Joseph Lardinois (13 August 1924 – 16 July 1987) was a Dutch politician and diplomat of the Catholic People's Party (KVP) and agronomist.

Lardinois applied at the Wageningen Agricultural College in June 1942 majoring in Agronomy. During the German occupation Lardinois continued his study but in March 1943 the refused to sign a loyalty oath to the German occupation authority but to escape prosecution he was forced to enlist in the Arbeitslager in the German armoured production industry. Following the end of World War II, Lardinois returned to the Wageningen Agricultural College and obtained a Bachelor of Science in Agriculture degree in June 1947 before graduating with a Master of Science in Engineering degree in on 23 January 1951. Lardinois worked as an agronomist from October 1951 until February 1960 for the municipality of Purmerend from October 1951 until November 1952 and for the municipality of Eindhoven from November 1952 until February 1960. Lardinois worked as a civil servant for the Ministry of Agriculture and Fisheries as an agricultural Attaché in London, England from February 1960 until September 1963.

Lardinois became a Member of the House of Representatives after Victor Marijnen was appointed as Prime Minister in the Cabinet Marijnen after the election of 1963, taking office on 17 September 1963. Lardinois was selected as a Member of the European Parliament and dual served in those positions, taking office on 14 October 1963. Lardinois also became active in the public sector, in December 1964 Lardinois was appointed as a trade association executive for the North Brabant Christian Farmers' association (NCB) serving as chairman from 1 January 1965 until 5 April 1967. After the election of 1967 Lardinois was appointed as Minister of Agriculture and Fisheries in the Cabinet De Jong, taking office on 5 April 1967. After the election of 1971 Lardinois returned as a Member of the House of Representatives, taking office on 11 May 1971. Following the cabinet formation of 1971 Lardinois continued as Minister of Agriculture and Fisheries in the Cabinet Biesheuvel I, taking office on 6 July 1971. Lardinois was also appointed as Minister for Suriname and Netherlands Antilles Affairs, taking office on 28 January 1972. The Cabinet Biesheuvel I fell just one year later on 19 July 1972 and continued to serve in a demissionary capacity until it was replaced by the caretaker Cabinet Biesheuvel II with Lardinois continuing as Minister of Agriculture and Fisheries and Minister for Suriname and Netherlands Antilles Affairs, taking office on 9 August 1972.

In December 1972 Lardinois was nominated as the next European Commissioner from the Netherlands. Lardinois was given the portfolios of Agriculture and Fisheries in the Ortoli Commission, he resigned as Minister of Agriculture and Fisheries and Minister for Suriname and Netherlands Antilles Affairs on 1 January 1973 and was installed as European Commissioner, serving from 6 January 1973 until 6 January 1977.

Lardinois retired after spending 13 years in national politics and became active in the private sector, in December 1976 Lardinois was appointed as CEO and Chairman of the Board of directors of the Rabobank serving from 1 January 1977 until 1 September 1986.

Lardinois was known for his abilities as a manager and policy wonk. Lardinois continued to comment on political affairs until his death from cancer at the age of 62.

== Decorations ==
Honours
Ribbon bar	Honour	Country	Date	Comment
	Knight of the Order of the Holy Sepulchre	Holy See	15 April 1968	
	Grand Officer of the Order of Leopold II	Belgium	19 May 1969	
	Grand Officer of the Order of the Oak Crown	Luxembourg	28 September 1970	
	Commander of the Order of Orange-Nassau	Netherlands	8 June 1973	
	Grand Officer of the Legion of Honour	France	11 November 1974	
	Knight Commander of the Order of Merit	Germany	15 August 1976	
	Commander of the Order of the Netherlands Lion	Netherlands	1 January 1977	
	Officer of the Order of Agricultural Merit	France	15 February 1977	
	Grand Cordon of the Honorary Order of the Palm	Suriname	25 April 1978	

Political offices
Preceded by Barend Biesheuvel	Minister of Agriculture and Fisheries; 1967–1973	Succeeded by Jaap Boersma; Ad interim
Preceded by Roelof Nelissen	Minister for Suriname and Netherlands Antilles Affairs; 1972–1973	Succeeded by Molly Geertsema
Preceded by Sicco Mansholt	European Commissioner from the Netherlands; 1973–1977	Succeeded by Henk Vredeling
Preceded by Carlo Scarascia-Mugnozza	European Commissioner for Agriculture and Fisheries; 1973–1977	Succeeded by Finn Olav Gundelach
Business positions
Unknown	Chairman of the North Brabant Christian Farmers' association 1965–1967	Unknown
Preceded by Bram Verhage	CEO and Chairman of the Board of directors of the Rabobank; 1977–1986	Succeeded by Herman Wijffels
