= European Commissioner for Agriculture and Food =

Member of the EU Commission

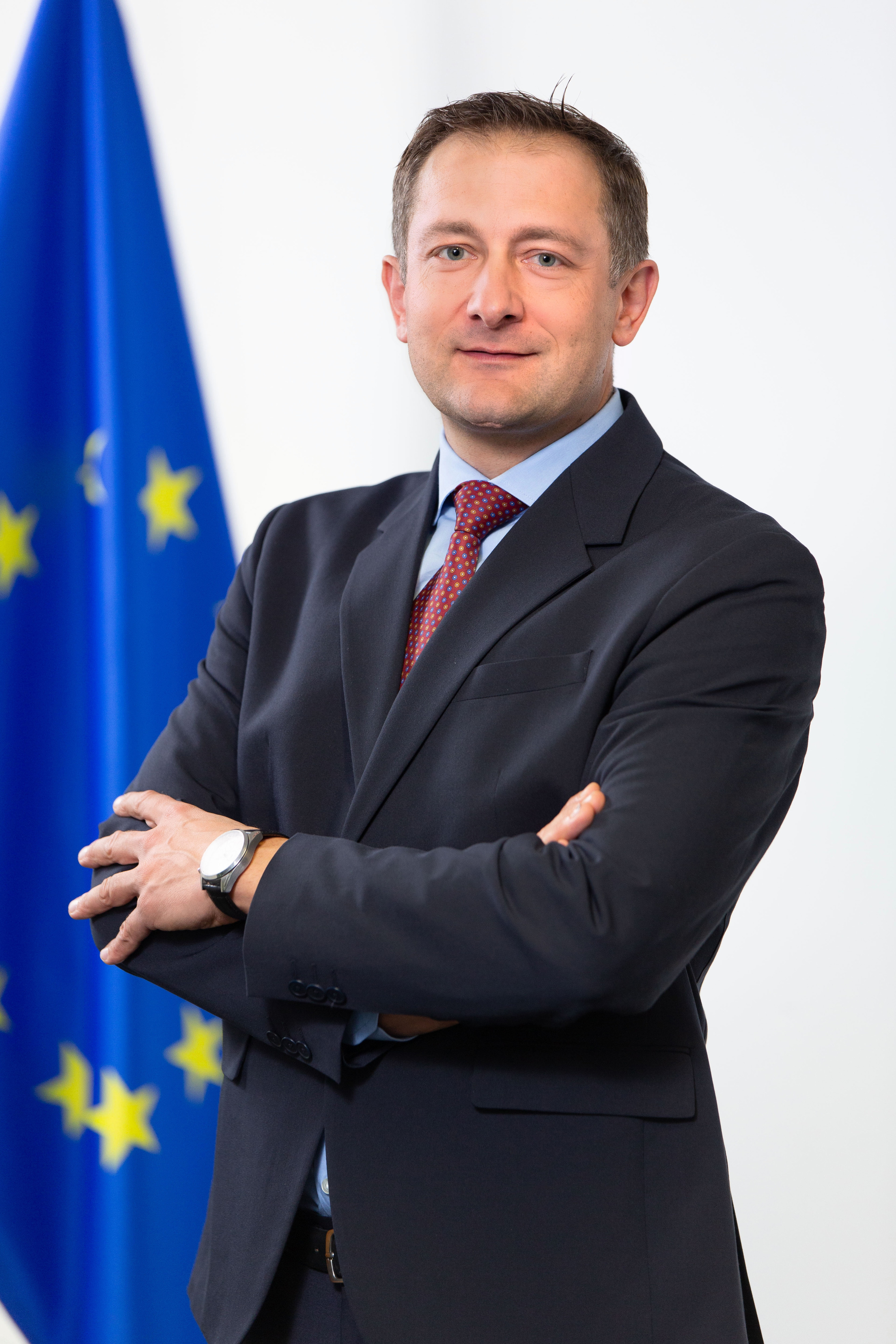
- Incumbent; Christophe Hansen since 1 December 2024
- Directorate-General for Agriculture and Rural Development
- Reports to: Ursula von der Leyen
- Seat: Berlaymont building, Brussels, Belgium
- Appointer: President of the European Commission
- Term length: 5 years
- Constituting instrument: Treaties of the European Union
- Precursor: European Commissioner for Agriculture
- Formation: 7 January 1958
- First holder: Sicco Mansholt
- Website: ec.europa.eu/agriculture

The European Commissioner for Agriculture and Food is a member of the European Commission. The post is currently held by Commissioner Christophe Hansen. The post is in charge of rural issues, including most notably the controversial Common Agricultural Policy (CAP) which represents 44% of the EU budget. They also participate in meetings of the Agriculture and Fisheries Council (Agrifish) configuration of the Council of the European Union.

== List of commissioners ==
#	Name	Country	Period	Commission
1	Sicco Mansholt	Netherlands	1958–1972	Hallstein Commission, Rey Commission, Malfatti Commission
2	Carlo Scarascia-Mugnozza	Italy	1972–1973	Mansholt Commission
3	Pierre Lardinois	Netherlands	1973–1977	Ortoli Commission
4	Finn Olav Gundelach	Denmark	1977–1981	Jenkins Commission, Thorn Commission
5	Poul Dalsager	Denmark	1981–1985	Thorn Commission
6	Frans Andriessen	Netherlands	1985–1989	Delors Commission I
7	Ray MacSharry	Ireland	1989–1992	Delors Commission II
8	René Steichen	Luxembourg	1992–1995	Delors Commission III
9	Franz Fischler	Austria	1995–2004	Santer Commission, Prodi Commission
10	Sandra Kalniete	Latvia	2004	Prodi Commission
11	Mariann Fischer Boel	Denmark	2004–2010	Barroso Commission I
12	Dacian Cioloş	Romania	2010–2014	Barroso Commission II
13	Phil Hogan	Ireland	2014–2019	Juncker Commission
14	Janusz Wojciechowski	Poland	2019–2024	Von der Leyen Commission I
15	Christophe Hansen	Luxembourg	2024–present	Von der Leyen Commission II

== See also ==
- Agriculture and Fisheries Council (Council of the European Union)
- Common Agricultural Policy
- Directorate-General for Agriculture and Rural Development
- Directorate-General for Agriculture, Fisheries, Social Affairs and Health
- Doha Development Round
- European Parliament Committee on Agriculture and Rural Development
- Geographical indications and traditional specialities in the European Union
- Land allocation decision support system
- Single Payment Scheme
