= Wapserveen =

- Village
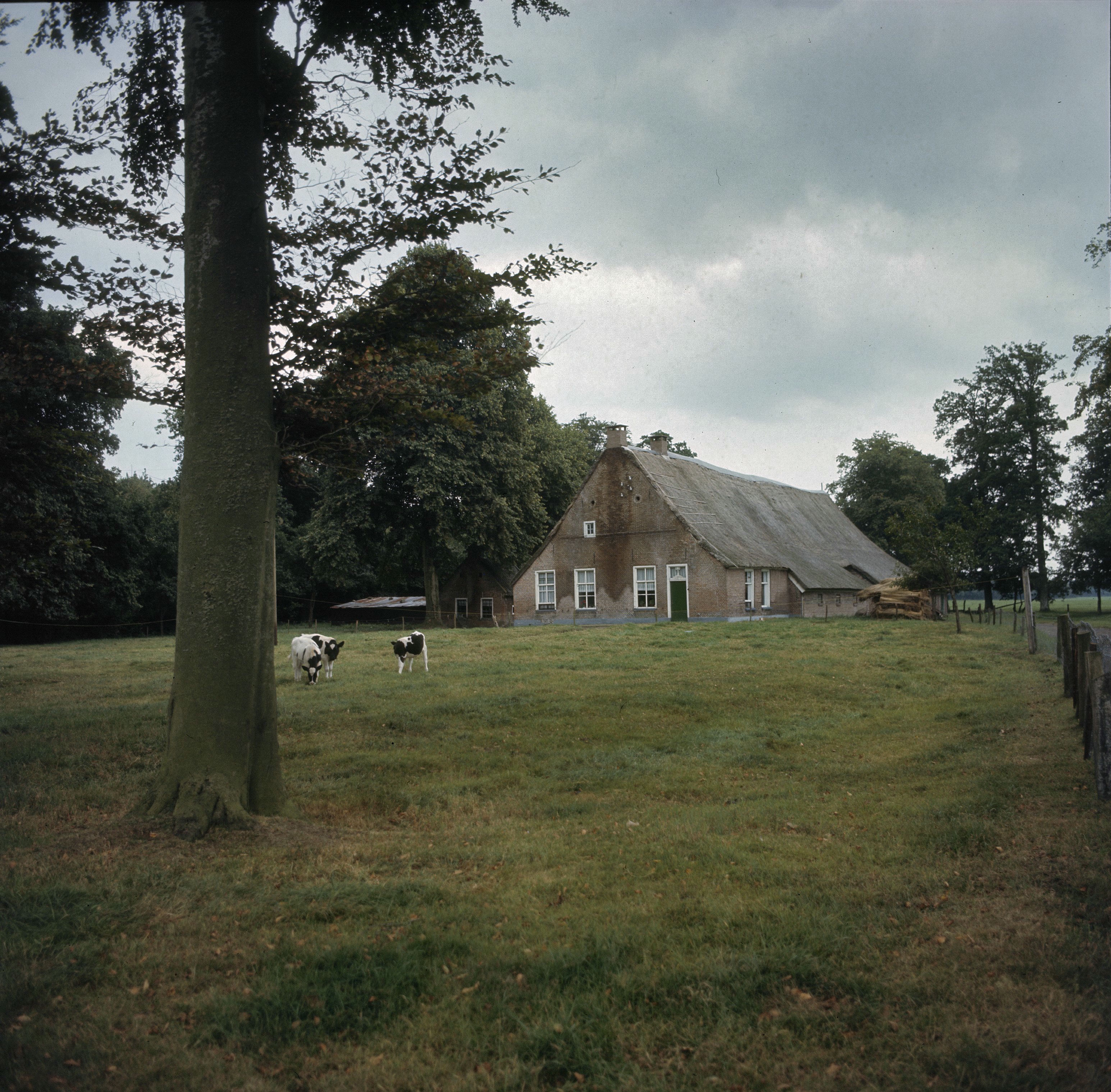
- Farm in Wapserveen

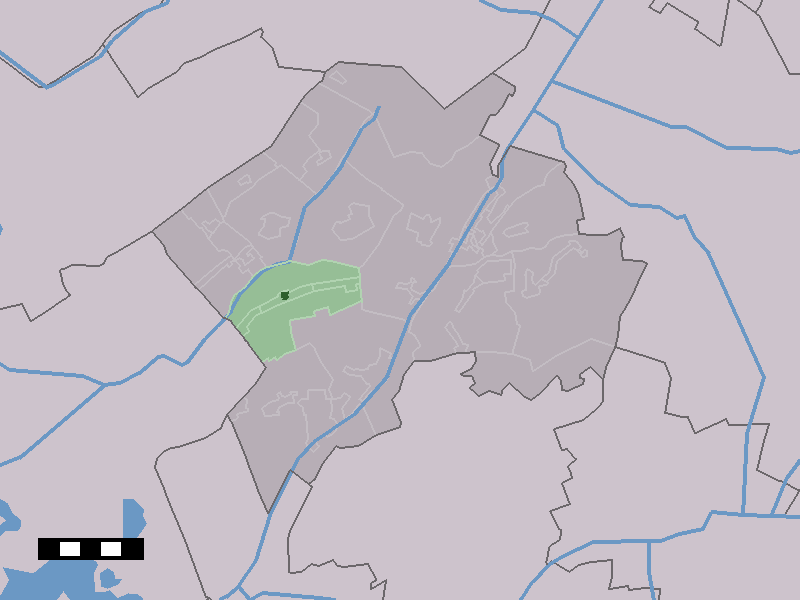
- The village centre (dark green) and the statistical district (light green) of Wapserveen in the municipality of Westerveld.

- Location in province of Drenthe in the Netherlands Wapserveen (Netherlands)
- Coordinates: 52.8234°N 6.2132°E
- Country: Netherlands
- Province: Drenthe
- Municipality: Westerveld

Area
  - Total: 19.07 km^{2} (7.36 sq mi)
- Elevation: 5 m (16 ft)

Population (2021)
  - Total: 790
  - Density: 41/km^{2} (110/sq mi)
- Time zone: UTC+1 (CET)
  - Summer (DST): UTC+2 (CEST)
- Postal code: 8351
- Dialing code: 0521

Wapserveen is a village in the Dutch province of Drenthe. It is a part of the municipality of Westerveld, and lies about 21 km northwest of Hoogeveen.

== History ==
The village was first mentioned in 1395 or 1396 as Wasperveen, which means "peat excavation village belonging to Wapse". Wapserveen is a road village near a peat excavation area. It was founded by colonists from Friesland. Large scale excavation did not start until the 17th and 18th century.

The Dutch Reformed church dates from 1803, but was built with bricks from its medieval predecessor. A separate bell tower was placed on the cemetery around the same time. During the Reformation, the Catholic church became Dutch Reformed and the priest was replaced by the minister Foppius Hilarii in 1606. However, the villagers preferred the priest, and Hilarii was killed by a farmer. The former priest was given a state pension in 1607 on the condition that he no longer practise and assisted the minister.

Wapserveen was home to 617 people in 1840. In 1896, the cooperative dairy factory in Wapserveen was built in the village.

== People ==
Sicco Mansholt, the former president of the European Commission (1972) and former European Commissioner for Agriculture between 1958 and 1972 lived after his career until his death in Wapserveen.

== Gallery ==
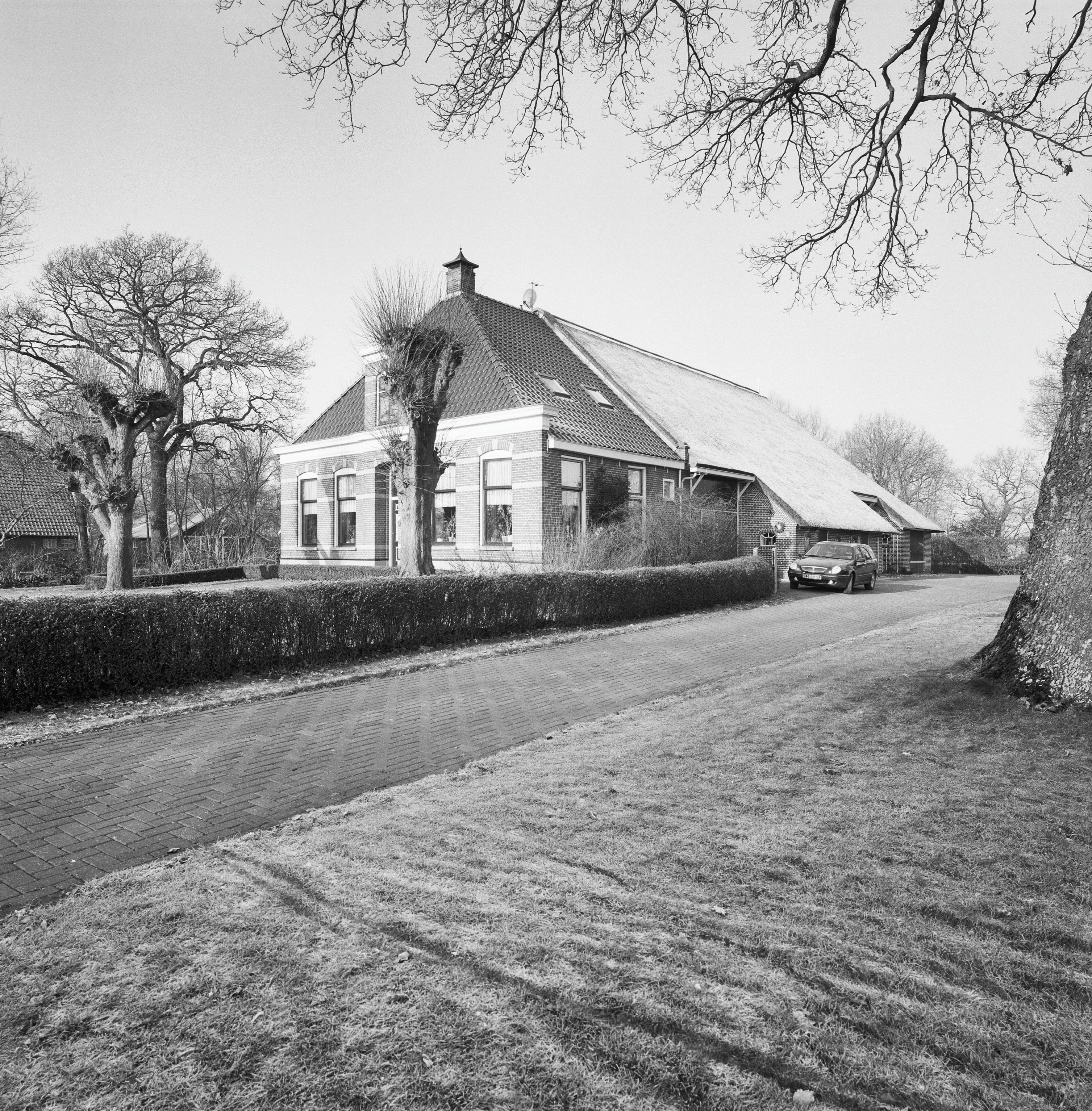
Farm in Wasperveen

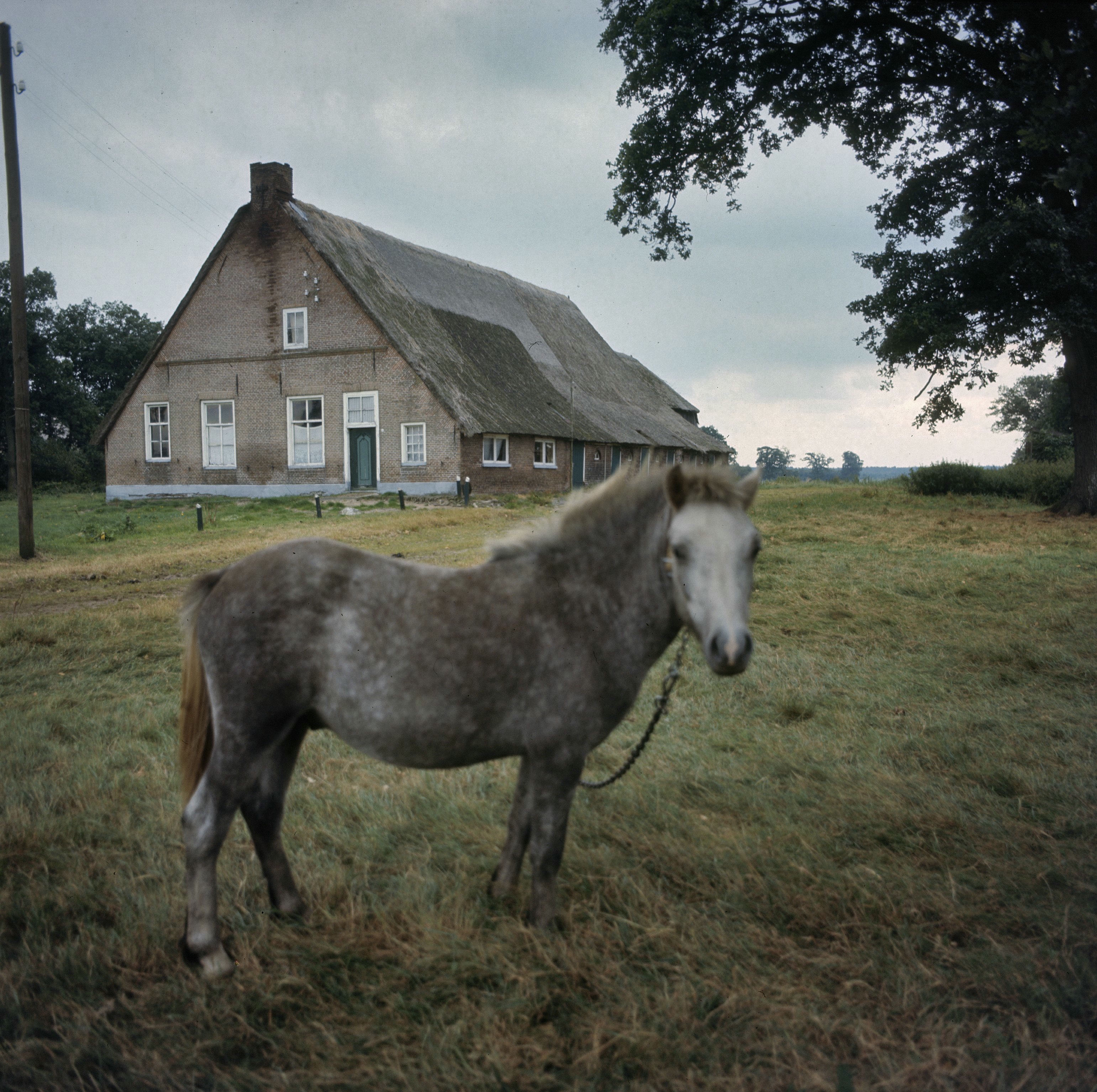
Farm and horse in Wasperveen

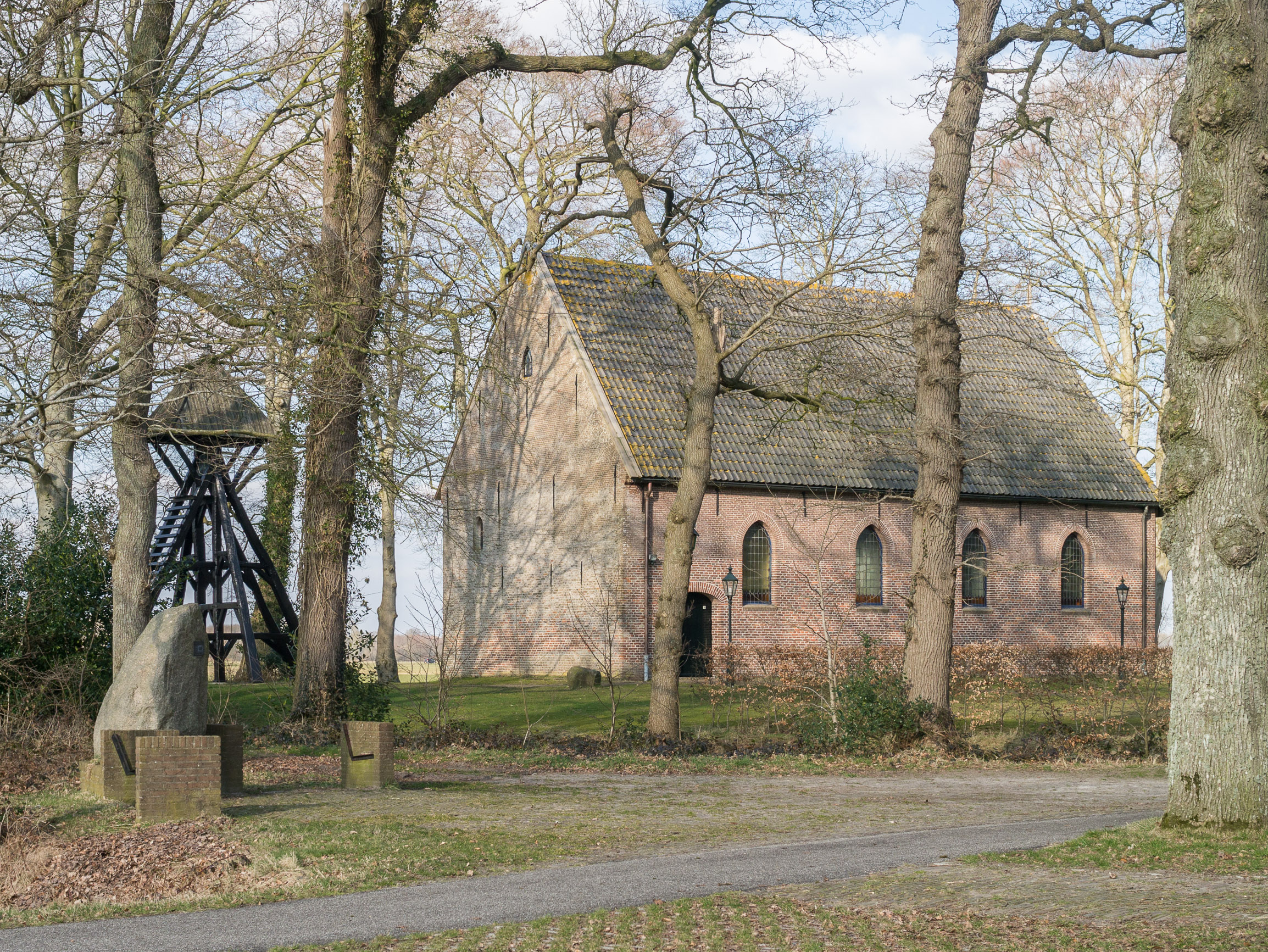
Dutch Reformed church
