= Vice-president of the European Commission =

Position

A vice-president of the European Commission is a member of the European Commission who leads the commission's work in particular focus areas in which multiple European Commissioners participate.

Currently, the European Commission has a total of six vice-presidents: five executive vice-presidents, and the high representative who is ex officio one of the vice-presidents as well.

== Role and salaries ==
The role of vice-president of the European Commission may be bestowed on any European commissioner in addition to their existing portfolio. Vice-presidents are appointed by the president of the European Commission and confirmed by the European Parliament.

Since the 2009 Lisbon Treaty, the high representative of the union for foreign affairs and security policy is automatically and permanently one of the vice-presidents by virtue of their position as high representative (commonly referred to as the 'HR/VP' role). This means they are not appointed as vice-president as such, and the appointment procedure to the position of High Representative is different from that of the Commissioners.

Commission salaries are set as a percentage of the top civil service grade. Vice-Presidents are paid at 125% (€22,122.10 monthly), in comparison to 112.5% (€19,909.89) for normal Commissioners and 138% (€24,422.80) for the president. However, the vice-president who also serves as the High Representative is paid at 130% (€23,006.98). There are further allowances on top of these figures.

== Executive vice-president ==
The von der Leyen Commission established a new position of executive vice-president. There are three executive vice-presidents, each appointed from one of the three largest political groups in the European Parliament. In addition to their 'regular' role as commissioner, they also manage a broader and horizontal policy area involving the coordination of multiple commissioners. Unlike the other vice-presidents, executive vice-presidents are assigned a specific Directorate-General under their authority for this part of their job and their policy areas are considered the top priorities of the incumbent European Commission.

Between 2004 and 2019, the position of first vice-president existed instead. The main role of this position was that of a vice president in the narrow sense: taking over from the president in their absence. The position was established under the Barroso I Commission in 2004, with its first occupant being Margot Wallström. She was succeeded in the second Barroso Commission by Catherine Ashton, who was also the high representative of the Union for foreign affairs and security policy. The last First vice-president was Frans Timmermans as part of the Juncker Commission, who subsequently became one of three executive vice-presidents in 2019.

== List of vice-presidents ==
Legend: Socialist (PES) – Liberal (ALDE, Renew Europe) – People's (EPP-ED)

Commission	Entered office	Left office	Name	State	Party
Hallstein I	7 January 1958	9 January 1962	Sicco Mansholt	Netherlands	PvdA
Hallstein I	7 January 1958	9 January 1962	Robert Marjolin	France	SFIO
Hallstein I	7 January 1958	15 September 1959	Piero Malvestiti	Italy	DC
Hallstein II	10 January 1962	30 June 1967	Sicco Mansholt	Netherlands	PvdA
Hallstein II	10 January 1962	30 June 1967	Robert Marjolin	France	SFIO
Hallstein II	10 January 1962	15 May 1963	Giuseppe Caron	Italy	DC
Hallstein II	30 July 1965	30 June 1967	Lionello Sandri	Italy	PSI
Rey	2 July 1967	30 June 1970	Sicco Mansholt	Netherlands	PvdA
Rey	2 July 1967	30 June 1970	Lionello Sandri	Italy	PSI
Rey	2 July 1967	30 June 1970	Fritz Hellwig	West Germany	CDU
Rey	2 July 1967	30 June 1970	Raymond Barre	France	UDF
Rey	2 July 1967	30 June 1970	Wilhelm Haferkamp	West Germany	SPD
Malfatti	1 July 1970	21 March 1972	Sicco Mansholt	Netherlands	PvdA
Malfatti	1 July 1970	21 March 1972	Wilhelm Haferkamp	West Germany	SPD
Mansholt	22 March 1972	5 January 1973	Wilhelm Haferkamp	West Germany	SPD
Ortoli	6 January 1973	5 January 1977	Patrick Hillery	Ireland	FF
Ortoli	6 January 1973	5 January 1977	Wilhelm Haferkamp	West Germany	SPD
Ortoli	6 January 1973	5 January 1977	Henri Simonet	Belgium	PS
Ortoli	6 January 1973	5 January 1977	Christopher Soames	United Kingdom	Con.
Ortoli	6 January 1973	5 January 1977	Carlo Scarascia-Mugnozza	Italy	DC
Jenkins	6 January 1977	5 January 1981	Wilhelm Haferkamp	West Germany	SPD
Jenkins	6 January 1977	5 January 1981	Henk Vredeling	Netherlands	PvdA
Jenkins	6 January 1977	5 January 1981	Finn Olav Gundelach	Denmark	SD
Jenkins	6 January 1977	5 January 1981	François-Xavier Ortoli	France	RPR
Jenkins	6 January 1977	5 January 1981	Lorenzo Natali	Italy	DC
Thorn					
Thorn	6 January 1981	5 January 1985	Christopher Tugendhat	United Kingdom	Con.
Thorn	6 January 1981	5 January 1985	François-Xavier Ortoli	France	RPR
Delors I	6 January 1985	5 January 1989	Frans Andriessen	Netherlands	CDA
Delors I	6 January 1985	5 January 1989	Arthur Cockfield	United Kingdom	Con.
Delors I	6 January 1985	5 January 1989	Karl-Heinz Narjes	West Germany	CDU
Delors I	6 January 1985	5 January 1989	Lorenzo Natali	Italy	DC
Delors I	5 January 1986	5 January 1989	Manuel Marín	Spain	PSOE
Delors II	6 January 1989	5 January 1993	Frans Andriessen	Netherlands	CDA
Delors II	6 January 1989	5 January 1993	Leon Brittan	United Kingdom	Con.
Delors II	6 January 1989	5 January 1993	Henning Christophersen	Denmark	Venstre
Delors II	6 January 1989	5 January 1993	Manuel Marín	Spain	PSOE
Delors II	6 January 1989	5 January 1993	Filippo Maria Pandolfi	Italy	DC
Delors III	6 January 1993	22 January 1995	Martin Bangemann	Germany	FDP
Delors III	6 January 1993	22 January 1995	Leon Brittan	United Kingdom	Con.
Delors III	6 January 1993	22 January 1995	Henning Christophersen	Denmark	Venstre
Delors III	6 January 1993	22 January 1995	Manuel Marín	Spain	PSOE
Delors III	6 January 1993	22 January 1995	Karel Van Miert	Belgium	Sp.a
Delors III	6 January 1993	22 January 1995	Antonio Ruberti	Italy	PSI
Santer	23 January 1995	13 September 1999	Leon Brittan	United Kingdom	Con.
Santer	23 January 1995	19 July 1999	Manuel Marín	Spain	PSOE
Prodi	16 September 1999	21 November 2004	Neil Kinnock	United Kingdom	Labour
Prodi	16 September 1999	21 November 2004	Loyola de Palacio	Spain	PP
Barroso I	22 November 2004	9 February 2010	Margot Wallström	Sweden	SAP
Barroso I	22 November 2004	9 February 2010	Günter Verheugen	Germany	PSD
Barroso I	22 November 2004	9 February 2010	Jacques Barrot	France	UMP
Barroso I	22 November 2004	9 February 2010	Siim Kallas	Estonia	ERP
Barroso I	22 November 2004	8 May 2008	Franco Frattini	Italy	FI
Barroso I	9 May 2008	9 February 2010	Antonio Tajani	Italy	FI
Barroso II	9 February 2010	31 October 2014	Catherine Ashton	United Kingdom	Labour
Barroso II	9 February 2010	1 July 2014	Viviane Reding	Luxembourg	CSV
Barroso II	9 February 2010	31 October 2014	Joaquín Almunia	Spain	PSOE
Barroso II	9 February 2010	31 October 2014	Siim Kallas	Estonia	ERP
Barroso II	9 February 2010	31 October 2014	Neelie Kroes	Netherlands	VVD
Barroso II	9 February 2010	1 July 2014	Antonio Tajani	Italy	PDL
Barroso II	9 February 2010	31 October 2014	Maroš Šefčovič	Slovakia	Smer
Barroso II	27 October 2011	1 July 2014	Olli Rehn	Finland	SK
Barroso II	1 July 2014	31 October 2014	Michel Barnier	France	UMP
Barroso II	1 July 2014	31 October 2014	Günther Oettinger	Germany	CDU
Barroso II	16 July 2014	31 October 2014	Jyrki Katainen	Finland	KOK
Juncker	1 November 2014	30 November 2019	Frans Timmermans	Netherlands	PvdA
Juncker	1 November 2014	30 November 2019	Federica Mogherini	Italy	PD
Juncker	1 November 2014	31 December 2016	Kristalina Georgieva	Bulgaria	GERB
Juncker	1 November 2014	30 November 2019	Jyrki Katainen	Finland	KOK
Juncker	1 November 2014	30 November 2019	Valdis Dombrovskis	Latvia	Unity
Juncker	1 November 2014	1 July 2019	Andrus Ansip	Estonia	ERP
Juncker	1 November 2014	30 November 2019	Maroš Šefčovič	Slovakia	Smer-SD
Von der Leyen I	**1 December 2019**	**22 August 2023**	**Frans Timmermans**	**Netherlands**	**PvdA**
Von der Leyen I	**1 December 2019**	**30 November 2024**	**Margrethe Vestager**	**Denmark**	**RV**
Von der Leyen I	**1 December 2019**	**30 November 2024**	**Valdis Dombrovskis**	**Latvia**	**Unity**
Von der Leyen I	**1 December 2019** (Note: Executive Vice-President as of August 2023 after the resignation of Frans Timmermans)	**30 November 2024**	**Maroš Šefčovič**	**Slovakia**	**Smer-SD**
Von der Leyen I	1 December 2019	30 November 2024	Josep Borrell	Spain	PSOE
Von der Leyen I	1 December 2019	30 November 2024	Věra Jourová	Czech Republic	ANO
Von der Leyen I	1 December 2019	30 November 2024	Dubravka Šuica	Croatia	HDZ
Von der Leyen I	1 December 2019	30 November 2024	Margaritis Schinas	Greece	ND
Von der Leyen II					
Von der Leyen II	1 December 2024	present	**Teresa Ribera**	**Spain**	**PSOE**
Von der Leyen II	1 December 2024	present	Kaja Kallas	Estonia	ER
Von der Leyen II	1 December 2024	present	**Henna Virkkunen**	Finland	Kok
Von der Leyen II	1 December 2024	present	**Stéphane Séjourné**	France	RE
Von der Leyen II	1 December 2024	present	**Raffaele Fitto**	Italy	FdI
Von der Leyen II	1 December 2024	present	**Roxana Mînzatu**	Romania	PSD

- First vice-presidents are in italics.
- Executive vice-presidents are in **bold**.
