= Jan van den Brink =

Dutch politician and banker (1915–2006)

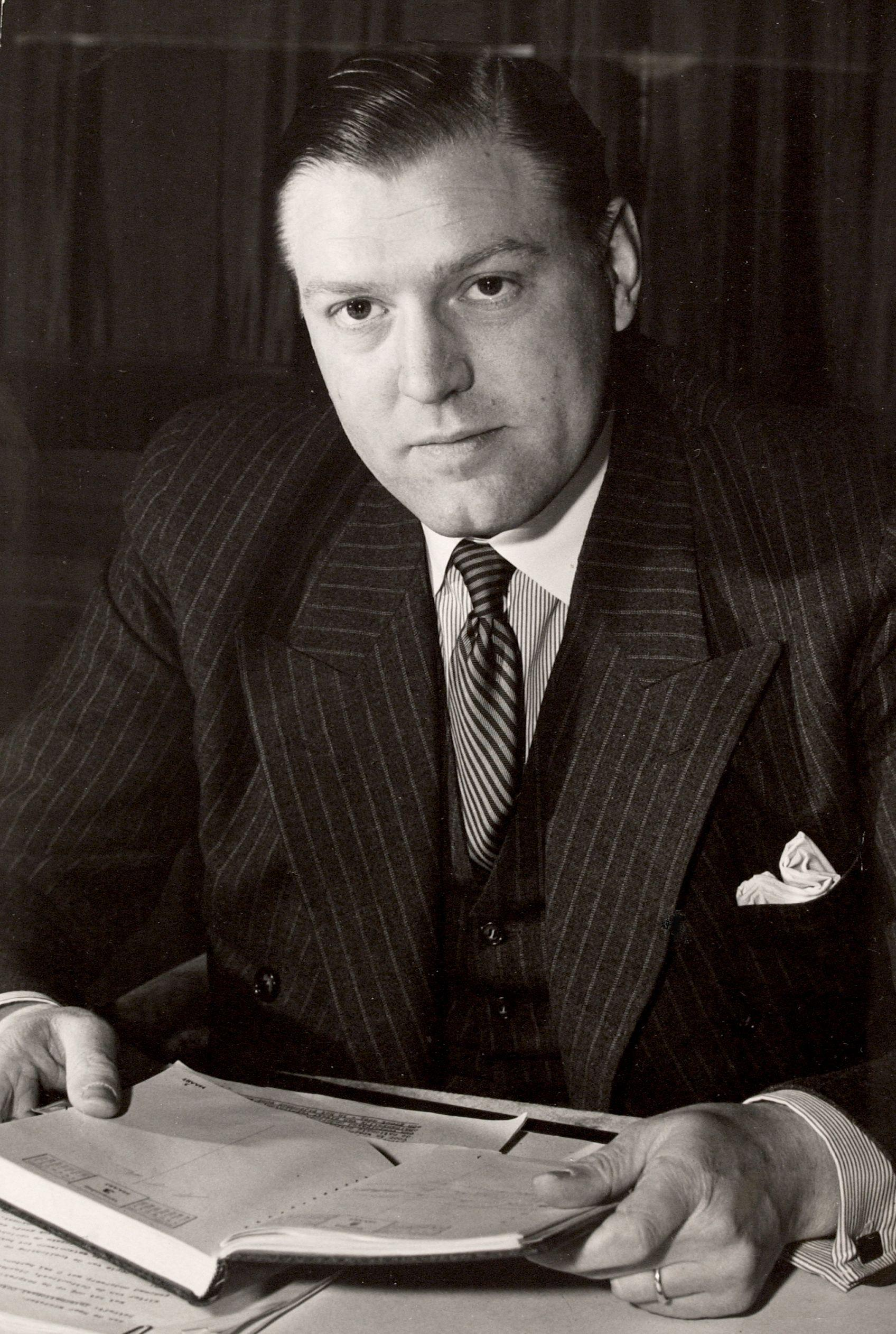
- Van den Brink in 1948

Minister of Economic Affairs
- In office 21 January 1948 – 2 September 1952
- Cabinet: Beel I; Drees–Van Schaik; Drees I
- Preceded by: Gerardus Huysmans
- Succeeded by: Jelle Zijlstra

Member of the Senate
- In office 20 November 1945 – 19 January 1948; 27 July 1948 – 11 August 1948

Personal details
- Born: Johannes Roelof Maria van den Brink; 12 April 1915 Laren, Netherlands
- Died: 19 July 2006 (aged 91) Hilversum, Netherlands
- Party: Roman Catholic State Party (until 1945); Catholic People's Party (1945 onwards)
- Spouse: Anneke Vermeulen (m. 1943)
- Children: 7
- Education: Tilburg University
- Occupation: Politician; banker

Johannes Roelof Maria "Jan" van den Brink (Dutch: [ˈjɑɱ vɑn də(m) ˈbrɪŋk]; 12 April 1915 – 19 July 2006) was a Dutch politician and banker. He was minister of economic affairs in three successive cabinets.

== Early life and career ==
Born in Laren, North Holland in 1915, he received his doctorate in economics from Tilburg University in 1942. He worked as a civil servant, and he became a professor at Radboud University Nijmegen in December 1945. Van den Brink started serving in the Senate in November 1945 as a member of the Roman Catholic State Party (RKSP), which continued as the Catholic People's Party (KVP) the following month. He was sworn in as Minister of Economic Affairs as part of the first Beel cabinet on 21 January 1948, becoming the youngest minister in Dutch political history. He stayed on in his position in the Drees–Van Schaik and first Drees cabinets, contributing to the post-World War II economic reconstruction of the Netherlands.

Van den Brink's last term as economic affairs minister ended on 2 September 1952, and he became and advisor of the Amsterdamsche Bank. He was a member of the board of directors of the bank between 1954 and 1964 and of the AMRO Bank until 1978, following the merger of the Amsterdamsche Bank and the Rotterdamsche Bank. After his departure from politics, he turned down several positions, including as prime minister. Van den Brink was an artist after his retirement, and he died in Hilversum in 2006 at the age of 91.

== Personal life ==
He married Anneke Vermeulen in May 1943, and he had seven children.

== Decorations ==
Honours
Ribbon bar	Honour	Country	Date	Comment
	Grand Cross of the Order of the Crown	Belgium	6 May 1949	
	Knight Commander with Star of the Order of St. Gregory the Great	Holy See	29 December 1951	
	Grand Cross of the Legion of Honour	France	9 April 1952	
	Grand Officer of the Order of Orange-Nassau	Netherlands	21 March 1978	Elevated from Commander (30 September 1952)
	Knight of the Order of the Holy Sepulchre	Holy See	20 October 1990	

Political offices
Preceded by Gerardus Huysmans	Minister of Economic Affairs; 1948–1952	Succeeded by Jelle Zijlstra
