= Ortoli Commission =

- Commission of the European Union

- The Ortoli Commission
- Date formed: 6 January 1973
- Date dissolved: 5 January 1977

People and organisations
- President of the Commission: François-Xavier Ortoli

History
- Predecessor: Mansholt
- Successor: Jenkins

The Ortoli Commission is the European Commission that held office from 6 January 1973 to 5 January 1977. Its President was François-Xavier Ortoli.

== Work ==
It was the successor to the Mansholt Commission and was succeeded by the Jenkins Commission. It was the first Commission since the first enlargement at the start of the year. It managed the extended Community during the instability of the Yom Kippur War, the 1973 oil crisis and the Turkish invasion of Cyprus.

== Membership ==
Portfolio(s)	Commissioner	Member state	Party affiliation	Ref.
President	François-Xavier Ortoli	France	UDR	
Vice President; External Relations	Christopher Soames, Baron Soames	United Kingdom	Conservative	
Vice President; Economic and Finance, Credit and Investments	Wilhelm Haferkamp	West Germany	SPD	
Vice President; Parliamentary Affairs, Environmental Policy, Transport	Carlo Scarascia-Mugnozza	Italy	Christian Democracy	
Vice President; Taxation, Energy	Henri François Simonet	Belgium	PS	
Vice President; Social Affairs	Patrick Hillery	Ireland	Fianna Fáil	
Development cooperation	Jean-François Deniau (resigned on 12 April 1973)	France	UDF	
Development	Claude Cheysson	France	Socialist Party	
Research, Science, Education	Ralf Dahrendorf	West Germany	FDP	
Competition	Albert Borschette	Luxembourg	Independent	
Agriculture	Pierre Lardinois	Netherlands	KVP	
Internal Market, Customs Union	Finn Olav Gundelach	Denmark	Independent	
Regional Policy	George Thomson	United Kingdom	Labour	
Industry and Technology	Altiero Spinelli	Italy	Italian Communist Party	

=== Summary by political leanings ===
The colour of the row indicates the approximate political leaning of the office holder using the following scheme:

Affiliation	No. of Commissioners
Right leaning / Conservative	4
Liberal	1
Left leaning / Socialist	6
Eurocommunist	1
Unknown / Independent	3

== See also ==
- Budgetary Treaty
