= Poul Dalsager =

Danish politician (1929–2001)

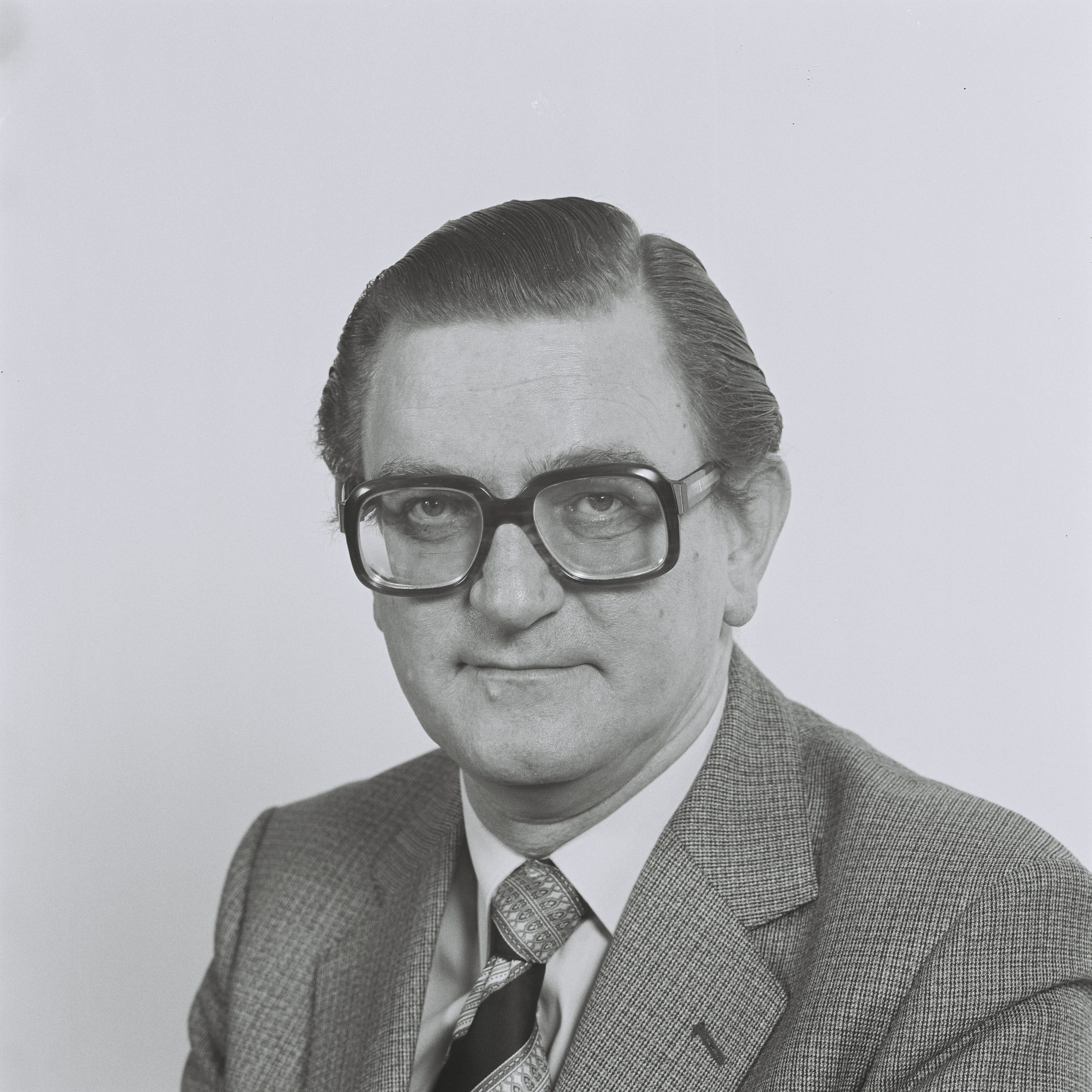
- Official portrait, 1981

European Commissioner for Agriculture
- In office 1981–1985
- President: Gaston Thorn
- Preceded by: Finn Olav Gundelach
- Succeeded by: Frans Andriessen

Minister of Agriculture and Fisheries of Denmark
- In office October 1979 – January 1981
- Prime Minister: Anker Jørgensen
- Preceded by: Niels Anker Kofoed
- Succeeded by: Bjørn Westh
- In office February 1975 – August 1978
- Prime Minister: Anker Jørgensen
- Preceded by: Niels Anker Kofoed
- Succeeded by: Niels Anker Kofoed

Personal details
- Born: 5 March 1929
- Died: 2 May 2001 (aged 72)
- Party: Social Democrats

Poul Christian Dalsager (5 March 1929 – 2 May 2001) was a Danish Social Democrats politician.

He was Minister of Agriculture in the second cabinet of Anker Jørgensen, from February 1975 to August 1978, and Minister of Fisheries from February 1975 to February 1977.

In the fourth cabinet of Anker Jørgensen, Dalsager was Minister of Agriculture and Fisheries from October 1979 to January 1981.

From 1981 to 1985, he was European Commissioner for Agriculture in the Thorn Commission.

He was mayor of Hjørring Municipality from 1990 to 1995, when he retired due to illness.

== Sources ==
- HVEM-HVAD-HVOR 1976, Politikens Forlag, København 1975.

Preceded by Finn Olav Gundelach	Danish European Commissioner; 1981–1985	Succeeded by Henning Christophersen
