= Mansholt Commission =

College of the European Commission from 1972 to 1973

The Mansholt Commission is the European Commission that held office from 22 March 1972 to 5 January 1973. Its president was Sicco Mansholt.

== Work ==
It was the successor to the Malfatti Commission and was succeeded by the Ortoli Commission. It oversaw the creation of the European Monetary System on 24 April 1972 and the first enlargement on 1 January 1973.

== Membership ==
The Mansholt Commission

Portfolio(s)	Commissioner	Member state	Party affiliation
President	Sicco Mansholt	Netherlands	PvdA
Vice President; Internal Market & Energy	Wilhelm Haferkamp	West Germany	SPD
Economic & Financial Affairs	Raymond Barre	France	UDF
Competition & Regional Policy	Albert Borschette	Luxembourg	
Social Affairs, Transport & Budget	Albert Coppé	Belgium	CVP
External Relations & Trade	Ralf Dahrendorf	West Germany	FDP
Foreign Affairs & Development Aid	Jean-François Deniau	France	UDF
Agriculture	Carlo Scarascia-Mugnozza	Italy	DC
Industrial Affairs & Research	Altiero Spinelli	Italy	PCI

=== Summary by political leanings ===
The colour of the row indicates the approximate political leaning of the office holder using the following scheme:

Affiliation	No. of Commissioners
Right leaning / Conservative	2
Liberal	3
Left leaning / Socialist	2
Eurocommunist	1
Unknown / Independent	1
