= Carlo Scarascia-Mugnozza =

Italian politician (1920–2004)

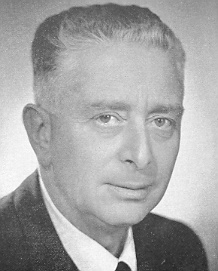
- Scarascia-Mugnozza in 1959

European Commissioner for Institutional Relations, Environment and Transport
- In office 6 January 1973 – 7 January 1977
- President: François-Xavier Ortoli
- Preceded by: Albert Coppé (Transport)
- Succeeded by: Lorenzo Natali (Energy, Environment, Enlargement); Richard Burke (Taxation and Customs Union, Transport and Consumer Protection)

European Commissioner for Agriculture
- In office 22 March 1972 – 5 January 1973
- President: Sicco Mansholt
- Preceded by: Sicco Mansholt
- Succeeded by: Pierre Lardinois

Personal details
- Born: 19 April 1920 Rome, Italy
- Died: 13 May 2004 (aged 84) Rome, Italy
- Party: Christian Democracy

Carlo Scarascia-Mugnozza (19 April 1920 – 13 May 2004) was an Italian politician.

Coming from a Catholic family, he joined the Christian Democracy at a very young age. He was a member of the Chamber of Deputies from 1953 to 1972. Between February 1962 and December 1963 he was Undersecretary for public education in the Fanfani IV government and Undersecretary for justice in the Leone I government.

He was a Member of the European Parliament from 1961 to 1972 and chaired its energy, research, and parliamentary political committees.

He served as a European Commissioner from 1972 to 1977: as Commissioner for Agriculture in the Mansholt Commission, and then as Commissioner Parliamentary Affairs, Environmental Policy, Transport in the Ortoli Commission.
