= President of the European Commission =

Head of the European Commission

- Logo of the Commission

- Flag of Europe

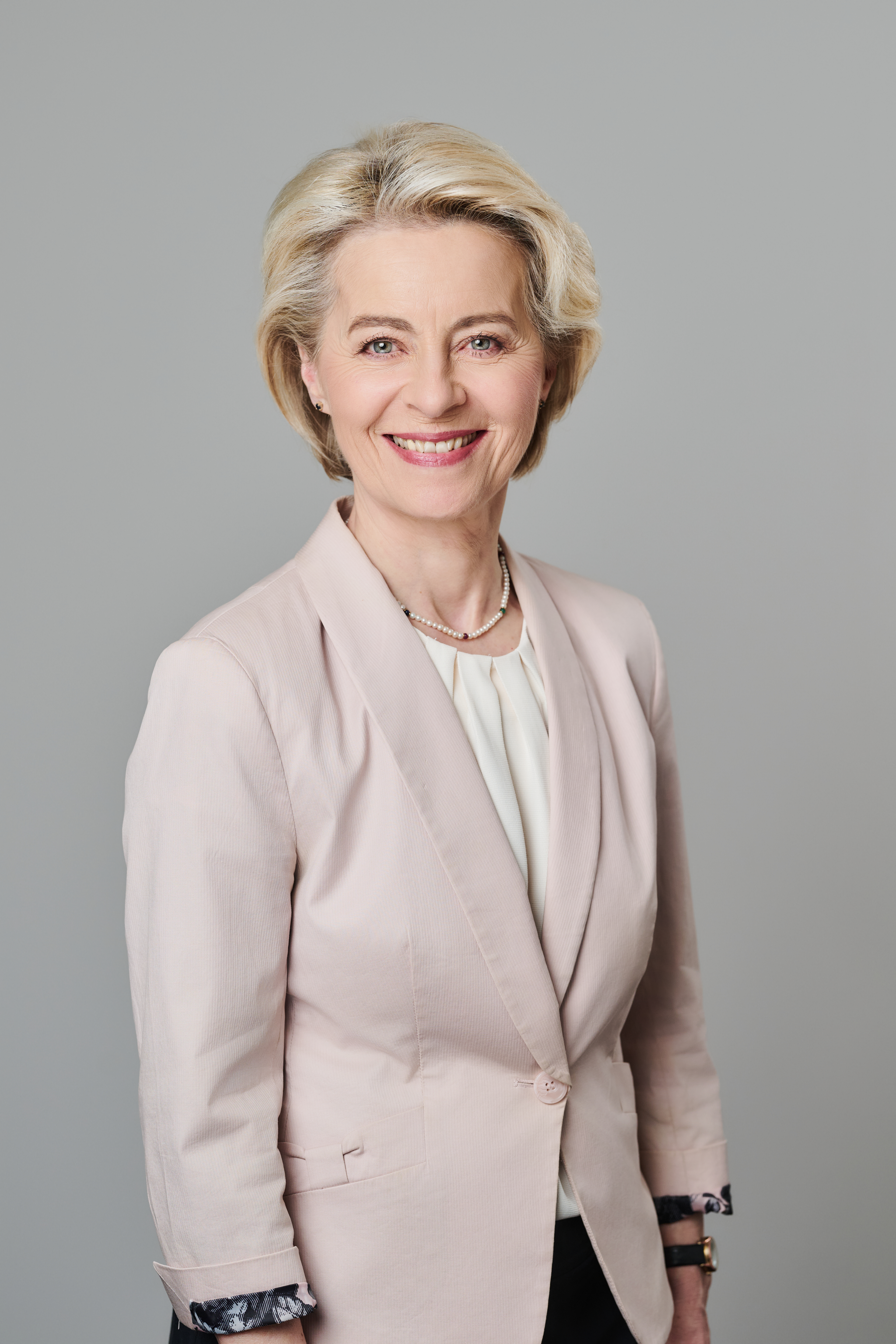
- Incumbent; Ursula von der Leyen since 1 December 2019
- European Commission
- Style: President (Note: The European Commission Style Guide denotes the correct form of oral address for the officeholder of the President of the European Commission is the gender-neutral "President", rather than the gender-specific "Mr President" or "Madam President" found in, for example, the United States.)
- Status: Head of government
- Member of: College of Commissioners; European Council
- Reports to: European Parliament; European Council
- Seat: Berlaymont, Brussels, Belgium
- Nominator: European Council
- Appointer: European Parliament
- Term length: Five years, renewable
- Constituting instrument: Treaties of the European Union
- Formation: 1 January 1958
- First holder: Walter Hallstein
- Deputy: First Vice-President of the European Commission
- Salary: €413,035 (2024)
- Website: ec.europa.eu

The president of the European Commission, also known as president of the College of Commissioners, is the head of the European Commission, the executive branch of the European Union (EU). The president of the Commission leads a cabinet of commissioners, referred to as the College. The president is empowered to allocate portfolios among, reshuffle, or dismiss commissioners as necessary. The college directs the commission's civil service, sets the policy agenda and determines the legislative proposals it produces. The Commission is the only body that can propose, (Note: within the areas specified by the Treaties) or draft, bills to become EU laws.

The Commission president also represents the EU abroad, together with the High Representative of the Union for Foreign Affairs and Security Policy. The post was established in 1958. Each new president is nominated by the European Council and elected by the European Parliament, (Note: The Parliament may only accept or reject the Council's choice.) for a five-year term. The president of the Commission also delivers an annual State of the Union address to the European Parliament.

In July 2019, the European Council nominated Ursula von der Leyen to succeed Jean-Claude Juncker, and she was elected the 13th president of the European Commission by the European Parliament on 16 July. Von der Leyen assumed office on 1 December 2019, following the approval of her nominated College of Commissioners by the European Parliament, and was re-elected on 18 July 2024.

== History ==
=== Establishment ===
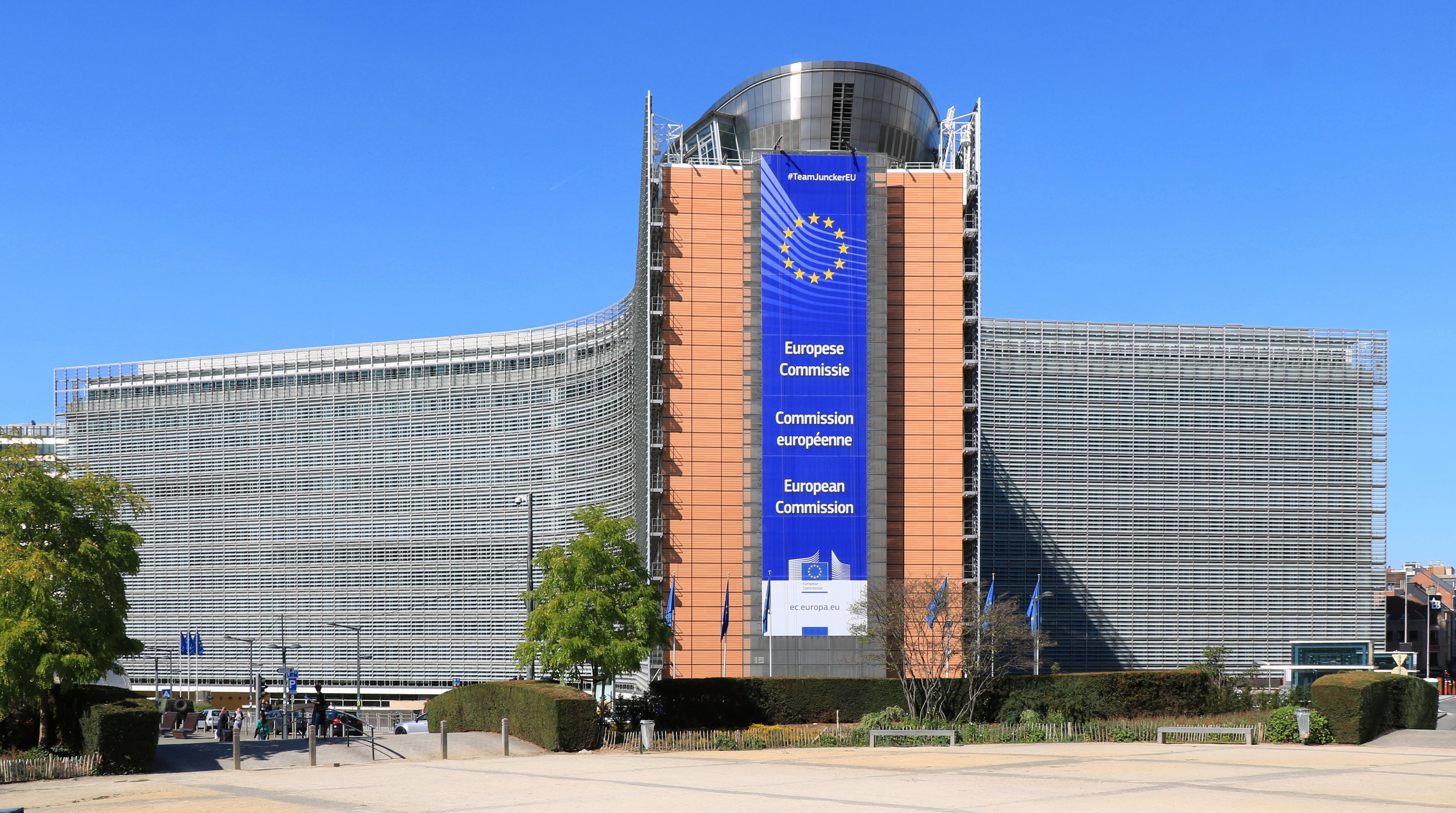
Headquarters of the European Commission in Brussels (Berlaymont building)

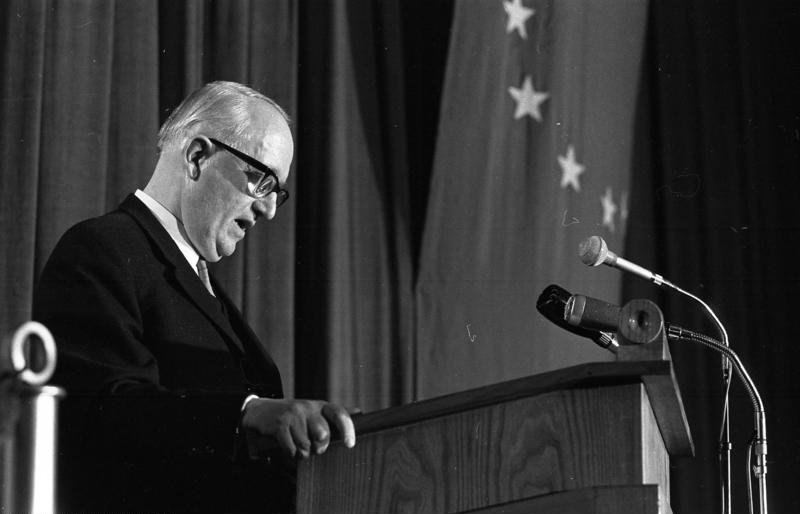
Walter Hallstein, the first president of the Commission

The present Commission was established by the Treaty of Rome in 1957; it also replaced the High Authority and the Commission of Euratom in 1967. The commission's first president was Walter Hallstein (see Hallstein Commission) who started consolidating European law and began to impact on national legislation. National governments at first took little heed of his administration, with the president having to stamp the commission's authority early on. With the aid of the European Court of Justice, the commission began to be taken more seriously.

In 1965, Hallstein put forward his proposals for the Common Agricultural Policy, which would give the Community its own financial resources while giving more power to the Commission and Parliament and removing the veto power over Agriculture in the council. These proposals led to an immediate backlash from France. Hallstein knew the proposals would be contentious, and took personal charge of drafting them, over-riding the Agriculture Commissioner. However he did gain the support of Parliament through his proposals to increase its powers, and he also presented his policy to Parliament a week before he submitted them to the council. He aimed to demonstrate how he thought the Community ought to be run, in the hopes of generating a wave of pro-Europeanism big enough to get past the objections of member states. However, in this it proved that, despite its past successes, Hallstein was overconfident in his risky proposals.

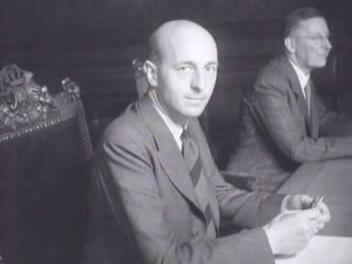
President Mansholt opened the first enlargement talks with Denmark, Ireland, Norway and the United Kingdom

In reaction to Hallstein's proposals and actions, then-French president Charles de Gaulle, who was sceptical of the rising supranational power of the commission, accused Hallstein of acting as if he were a head of state. France eventually withdrew its representative from the council, triggering the notorious "empty chair crisis". Although this was resolved under the "Luxembourg compromise", Hallstein became the scapegoat for the crisis. The Council refused to renew his term, despite his being the most 'dynamic' leader until Jacques Delors.

=== 1967–1985 ===
Hallstein's work did position the commission as a substantial power. The presidents were involved in the major political projects of the day in the 1970s, such as the European Monetary Union. In 1970, President Jean Rey secured the Community's own financial resources, and in 1977, President Roy Jenkins became the first Commission president to attend a G7 summit on behalf of the Community.

However, owing to problems such as the 1973 oil crisis and the 1979 energy crisis, economic hardship reduced the priority of European integration, with only the president trying to keep the idea alive. The member states had the upper hand, and they created the European Council to discuss topical problems, yet the council was unable to keep the major projects on track such as the Common Agricultural Policy. The Community entered a period of eurosclerosis, owing to economic difficulties and disagreements on the Community budget, and by the time of the Thorn Commission the president was unable to exert his influence to any significant extent.

=== Presidentialism ===
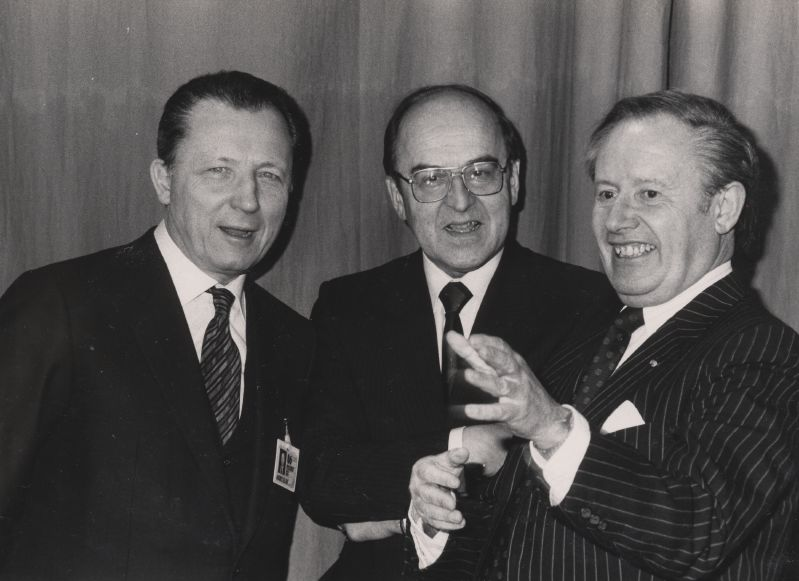
Jacques Delors (left) breathed new life into the European Commission Presidency after a period of 'eurosclerosis' under his predecessor, Gaston Thorn (right)

However, the commission began to recover under President Jacques Delors' Commission. He is broadly seen as the most successful president to his time, and credited with having given the Community a new sense of direction and dynamism. The International Herald Tribune noted the work of Delors at the end of his second term in 1992: "Mr. Delors rescued the European Community from the doldrums. He arrived when Europessimism was at its worst. Although he was a little-known (outside France) finance minister and former MEP, he breathed life and hope into the EC and into the dispirited Brussels Commission. In his first term, from 1985 to 1988, he rallied Europe to the call of the single market, and when appointed to a second term he began urging Europeans toward the far more ambitious goals of economic, monetary and political union."

Jacques Delors not only turned the Community around, he signalled a change in the Presidency. Before he came to power, the Commission president was ranked as merely the first among equals in presiding over the Commission's agenda; when he left office, he was the undisputed icon and leader of the Community. His tenure grew a strong Presidency and a strong Commission as the office of president became much more efficient and respected. Treaties that followed cemented this change, with the presidency gaining control over the allocating of portfolios as well as the prime authority to force resignations of errant Commissioners. Notably, when the succeeding President Romano Prodi took office with the new powers of the Treaty of Amsterdam, he was dubbed by the press as Europe's first Prime Minister. President Delors' work had increased the powers of the Parliament, whose support he had enjoyed. However, later Commissions did not enjoy the same support, and in 1999, the European Parliament used its powers to force the Santer Commission to resign.

=== Parliamentary oversight ===
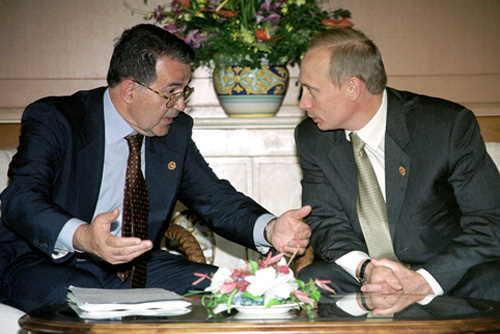
President Prodi was dubbed by the press as "Europe's first Prime Minister" due to his new powers

Historically, the Council appointed the Commission president and the whole body by unanimity without input from Parliament. However, with the Treaty on European Union in 1993, the European Parliament, the body elected directly by the citizens of the European Union, gained the right to be consulted on the appointment of the president and to veto the commission as a whole. Parliament decided to interpret its right to be consulted as a right to veto the president, which the Council reluctantly accepted. This right of veto was formalised in the Amsterdam Treaty. The Treaty of Nice changed the council's vote from a unanimous choice to one that merely needed a qualified majority. This meant that the weight of the Parliament in the process increased resulting in a quasi-parliamentary system where one group could be in government. This became evident when numerous candidates were put forward in 2004, and a centre-right vote won out over left-wing groups, France and Germany. José Manuel Barroso, elected Commission president that year, was then forced to back down over his choice of Commissioners, owing to Parliament's threat that it would not approve his Commission.

In 2009, the European People's Party (EPP) endorsed Barroso as its candidate for Commission president, and the EPP subsequently retained its position as largest party in that year's election. The Socialists responded by pledging to put forward a rival candidate at future elections. Once again, Barroso was forced by Parliament to make a change to his proposed Commission, but eventually received assent. However, in exchange for approval, Parliament forced some concessions from Barroso in terms of Parliamentary representation at Commission and international meetings. On 7 September 2010, Barroso gave the first US-style State of the Union address to Parliament, which focused primarily on the EU's economic recovery and human rights. The speech was to be annual.

== Appointment ==
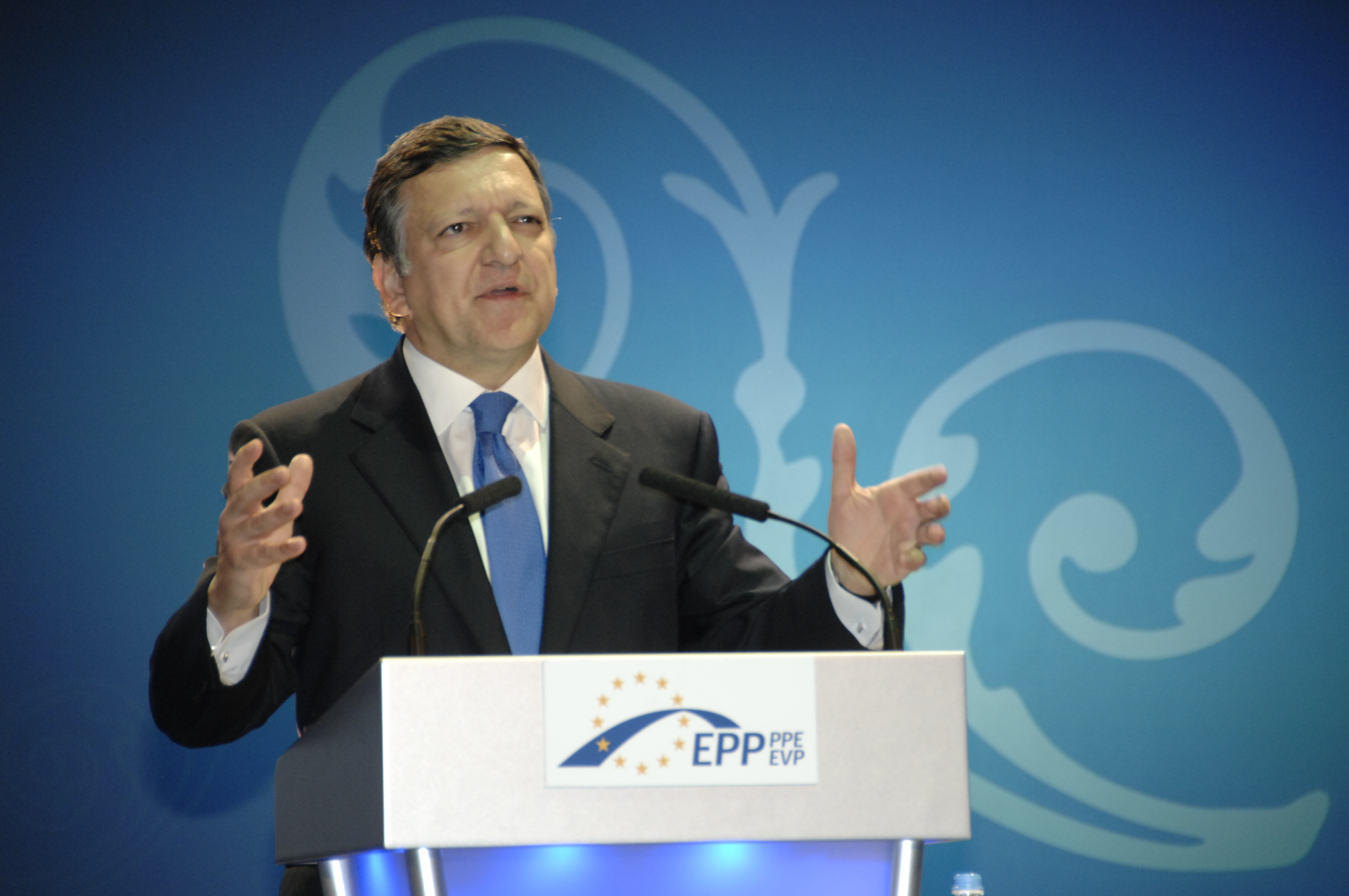
President Barroso, from the EPP which was the largest party after the 2004 and 2009 elections

Article 17 of the Treaty on European Union, as amended by the Treaty of Lisbon, lays out the procedure for appointing the president and their team. The European Council votes by reinforced qualified majority for a nominee for the post of President, taking account of the latest European elections. According to Article 238 of the Treaty on the Functioning of the European Union, the qualified majority is in this case a 'reinforced qualified majority' since the European Council votes on a proposal not coming from the European Commission or the High Representative of the Union for Foreign Affairs and Security Policy.

This proposal is then put before Parliament which must approve or veto the appointment. If an absolute majority of MEPs support the nominee, they are elected. The president then, together with the council, puts forward their team to the Parliament to be scrutinised. The Parliament normally insists that each one of them appear before the parliamentary committee that corresponds to their prospective portfolio for a public hearing. The Parliament then votes on the commission as a whole; if approved, the European Council, acting by a qualified majority, appoints the president and their team to office.

=== Transparency ===
Qualified majority in the Council has led to more candidates being fielded while there has been greater politicisation due to the involvement of Parliament and the change of policy direction in the EU from the creation of the single market to reform of it. However, despite this, the choice within the Council remains largely behind closed doors. During the appointment of Santer, discussions were kept in camera ("private" from Latin "in chamber"), with the media relying on insider leaks. MEPs were angry with the process, against the spirit of consultation that the new EU treaty brought in. Pauline Green MEP, leader of the Socialist group, stated that her group thought "Parliament should refuse to condone a practice which so sullies the democratic process". There were similar deals in 1999 and 2004 saw a repeat of Santer's appointment when Barroso was appointed through a series of secret meetings between leaders with no press releases on the negotiations being released. This was sharply criticised by MEPs such as the ALDE group leader Graham Watson who described the procedure as a "Justus Lipsius carpet market" producing only the "lowest common denominator"; while Green-EFA co-leader Daniel Cohn-Bendit asked Barroso after his first speech "If you are the best candidate, why were you not the first?"

=== Criteria ===
Number of presidents by member state
State	Presidents
Luxembourg	3
France	2
Germany	2
Italy	2
Belgium	1
Netherlands	1
Portugal	1
United Kingdom	1
Spain (acting)	1

The candidate selected by the Council has often been a leading national politician, but this is not a requirement. The choice of President must take into account the result of the latest Parliamentary elections (for example, by choosing the candidate supported by the largest European political party in particular, or at least someone from that political family – the Spitzenkandidat principle, below – but this is a convention, not an obligation). That provision was not in force in the nomination in 2004, but the centre-right EPP, which won the election, pressured for a candidate from its own ranks. In the end, the EPP candidate, José Manuel Barroso, was chosen. On the same basis, the EPP endorsed again Barroso for a second term during the 2009 European election campaign and, being largest again after that election, was able to secure his nomination by the European Council.

Further criteria seen to be influencing the choice of the Council include: which area of Europe the candidate comes from, favoured as Southern Europe in 2004; the candidate's political influence, credible yet not overpowering members; language, proficiency in French considered necessary by France; and degree of integration, their state being a member of both the eurozone and the Schengen Agreement.

=== Elections ===
In February 2008, President Barroso admitted that despite the president having in theory as much legitimacy as heads of governments, in practice it was not the case. The low voter turnout creates a problem for the president's legitimacy, with the lack of a "European political sphere", but analysts claim that if citizens were voting for a list of candidates for the post of President, turn out would be much higher than that seen in recent years.

Under the Treaty of Lisbon the European Council has to take into account the results of the latest European elections and, furthermore, the Parliament elects, rather than simply approves, the council's proposed candidate. This was taken as the parliament's cue to have its parties run with candidates for the president of the commission with the candidate of the winning party being proposed by the council. This was partly put into practice in 2004 when the European Council selected a candidate from the political party which secured a plurality of votes in that year's election. However, at that time only a minor party had run with a specific candidate: the then fourth-placed European Green Party, which had the first true pan-European campaign, put forward Daniel Cohn-Bendit and lost even its fourth place in the following election, becoming only the fifth-largest group in 2009 and diminishing its candidate's chances further. However, the victorious EPP only mentioned four or five people as candidates for president.

There have been plans to strengthen the European political parties for them to propose candidates for future elections. The European Liberal Democrat and Reform Party indicated, in its October 2007 congress, its intention to forward a candidate for the post as part of a common campaign but failed to do so. However, the EPP selected Barroso as its candidate and, as the largest party, it was able to ensure his turn was renewed.

The Socialists, disappointed at the 2009 election, agreed to put forward a candidate for Commission President at all subsequent elections. After a campaign within that party to have open primaries for said candidate, the PES Congress gathering in Brussels in November 2011 decided that the PES would designate its candidate for Commission president through primaries taking place in January 2014 in each of its member parties and organisations, before a ratification of the results by an Extraordinary PES Congress in February 2014.

=== Spitzenkandidat ===
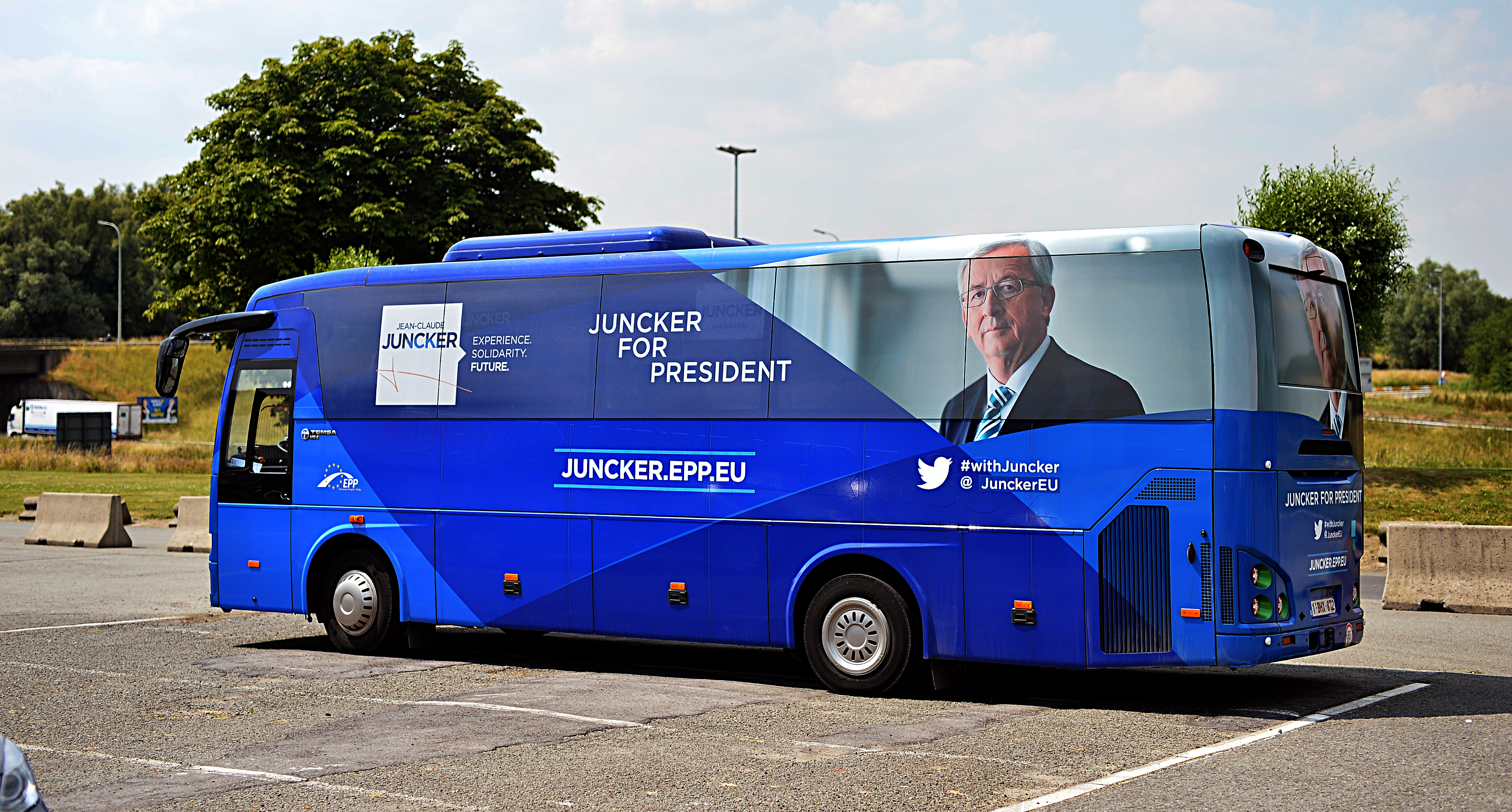
For the first time, prior to the 2014 election presidential candidates were nominated. This enabled them to present election programmes and campaign for the position (the EPP campaign bus of Jean-Claude Juncker depicted).

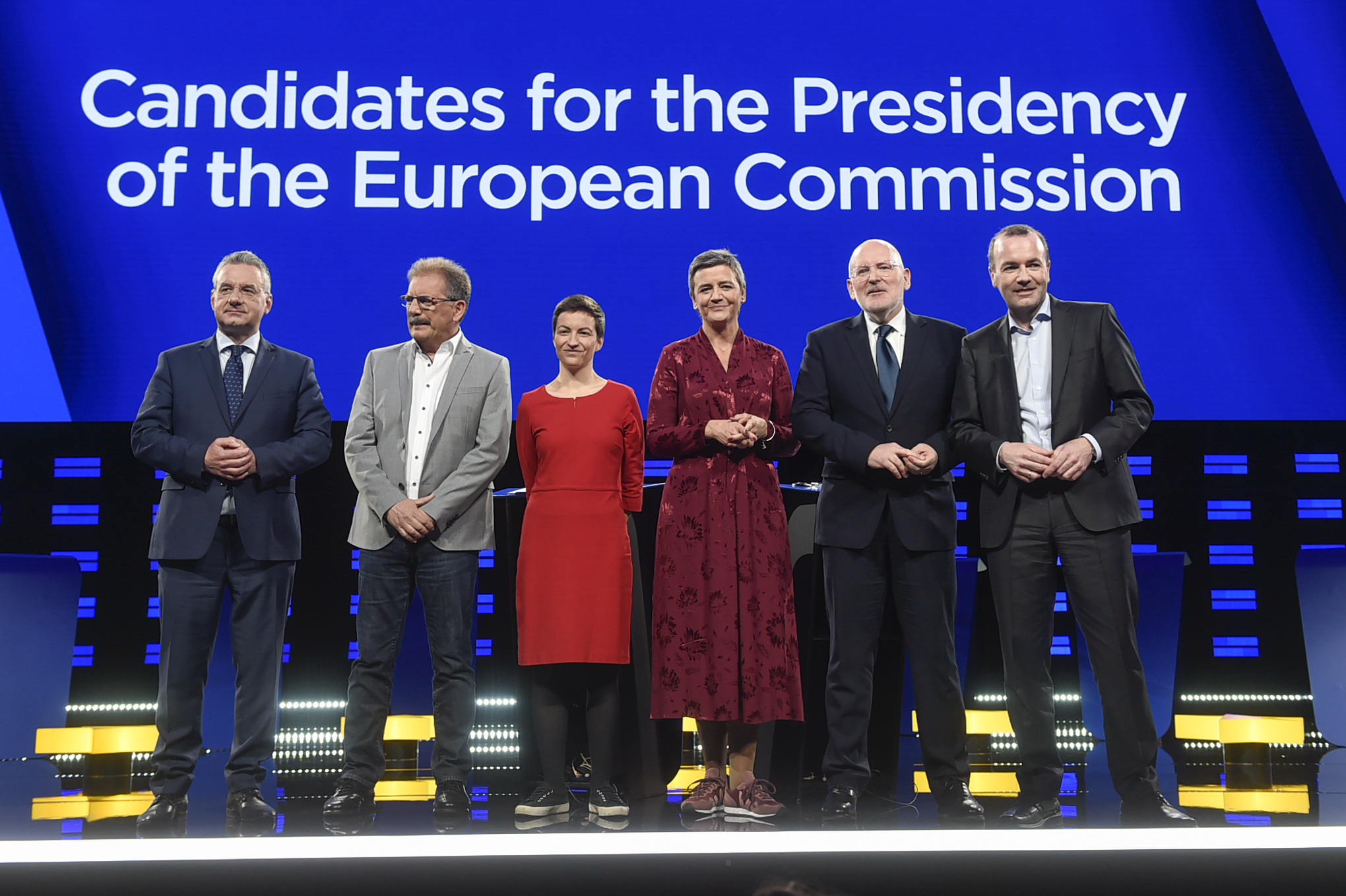
European Commission presidency candidates at Eurovision Debate (May 2019). Left to right: Zahradil, Cué, Keller, Vestager, Timmermans, Weber

The lead candidate (German: Spitzenkandidat) process is the method of linking the choice of President of the Commission to the outcome of the European Parliament elections, by having each major European Political Party (not to be confused with the Political groups of the European Parliament) nominating their candidate for Commission President prior to the Parliamentary elections. The Spitzenkandidat of the largest party (or the one able to secure the support of a majority coalition) would then have a mandate to assume the Commission Presidency. This process was first run in 2014, and its legitimacy was contested by some of the members of the European Council (with the UK and Hungarian Prime Ministers voting against the nomination of the EPP's Spitzenkandidat Jean Claude Juncker (see below)).

== Term of office ==
The president is elected for a five-year term starting five months after the elections to the European Parliament with no term limit specified. These were brought into alignment via the Maastricht Treaty (prior to which the commission had a four-year term of office) and the elections take place in June every five years (in years ending in 4 and 9). This alignment has led to a closer relationship between the elections and the president themself with the above-mentioned proposals for political parties running with candidates.

The president and their Commission may be removed from office by a vote of censure from Parliament. Parliament has never done this to date; however, the imminence of such a vote in 1999, due to allegations of financial mismanagement, led to the Santer Commission resigning on its own accord, before the Parliamentary vote.

== Duties and powers ==
The president of the European Commission is the most powerful position in the European Union, controlling the Commission which collectively has the right of initiative on Union legislation (only on matters delegated to it by member states for collective action, as determined by the treaties) and is responsible for ensuring its enforcement. The president controls the policy agenda of the commission for their term and in practice no policy can be proposed without the president's agreement.

The role of the president is to lead the commission, and give direction to the Commission and the Union as a whole. The treaties state that "the Commission shall work under the political guidance of its president" (Article 219 TEC), this is conducted through their calling and chairing of meetings of the College of Commissioners, their personal cabinet and the meetings of the heads of each commissioner's cabinet (the Hebdo). The president may also force a Commissioner to resign. The work of the commission as a body is based on the principle of cabinet collective responsibility; however, in their powers they act as more than a first among equals. The role of the president is similar to that of a national prime minister chairing a cabinet.

The president also has responsibility for representing the Commission in the Union and beyond. For example, they are a member of the European Council and takes part in debates in Parliament and the Council of Ministers. Outside the Union they attend the meetings of the G8 to represent the Union. However, in foreign affairs, the president does have to compete with several Commissioners with foreign affairs related portfolios: the High Representative for the Common Foreign and Security Policy and the president of the European Council.

The presidential system had started to develop since Jacques Delors and has since been cemented. However, externally they are still dependent on support from the Council and Parliament. Delors had enjoyed the Parliament's and the council's support for his whole term, during which, through treaty changes, the Parliament increased in powers and, through the accession of new member states, the Council increased in membership. The membership is now so large the president is increasingly unable to garner the support of all the states, even though the job is supposed to try to keep everyone happy. The Parliament now has more powers over the commission and can reject its proposals, although the commission has little power over Parliament, such as the ability to dissolve it to call new elections.

The president's office is on the top, 13th, floor of the Berlaymont building in Brussels. The president receives their political guidance from their cabinet, the head of which acts as a political bodyguard for the president. Such factors can lead to an isolation of the president from outside events. For the European Civil Service the president has a very high status, due to their immense authority and symbolism within the body. The president exercises further authority through the legal service and Secretariat-General of the Commission. The former has the power to strike down proposals on legal technicalities while the latter organises meetings, agendas and minutes. The president's control over these areas gives them further political tools when directing the work of the commission. This has also increased the presidential style of the Commission president.

With the reorganisation of leading EU posts under the Lisbon Treaty, there was some criticism of each post's vague responsibilities. Ukrainian ambassador to the EU Andriy Veselovsky praised the framework and clarified it in his own terms: The Commission president speaks as the EU's "government" while the president of the European Council is a "strategist". The High Representative specialises in "bilateral relations" while the European Commissioner for Enlargement and European Neighbourhood Policy deals in technical matters such as the free trade agreement with Ukraine. The president of the European Parliament meanwhile articulates the EU's values.

The MEP and author of several EU text books Richard Corbett has suggested that, instead of every EU institution having a "president", it would have been clearer if they had been named differently, with a "Speaker" of the Parliament, a "Governor" of the Central Bank, a "Chairman" of the (ordinary) Council of Ministers, a "president" of the European Council, and a "Prime Commissioner".

=== Relationship to the President of the European Council ===
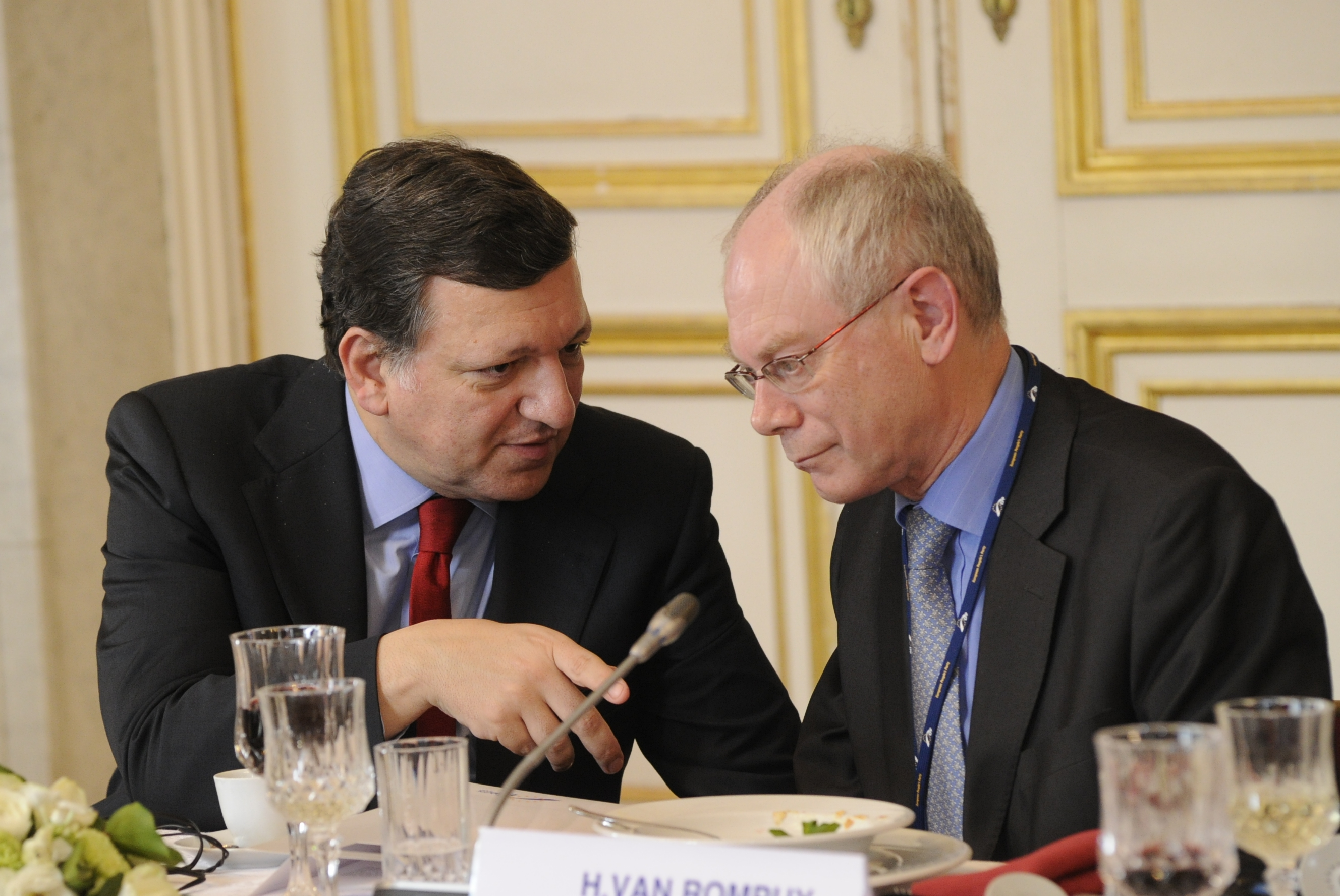
Having both a Commission president (Barroso, left) and a European Council president (Van Rompuy, right) led to concerns over confusion and infighting

Despite the presidential style, the president has also lost ground to the larger member states as countries such as France, Italy, the UK and Germany sought to sideline its role. This has increased with the creation of the permanent president of the European Council. There was disagreement and concern over competition between the former president of the European Council Van Rompuy and the former Commission president Barroso due to the vague language of the treaty. Some clarifications saw Van Rompuy as the "strategist" and Barroso as a head of government. In terms of economic planning Van Rompuy saw the commission as dealing with the content of the plan and the European Council as dealing with the means and implementing it. Despite weekly breakfasts together there was a certain extent of rivalry between the two, as well as with the High Representative. At international summits, both presidents represented the Union, with, in principle, the Commission president speaking on economic questions and the European Council president on political questions, although this division is often hard to maintain in practice.

Although there are concerns that this competition with the European Council president would lead to increased infighting, there are provisions for combining the two offices. The European Council president may not hold a national office, such as a prime minister of a member state, but there is no such restraint on European offices. As such, the Commission president, who already sits in the European Council, could also be appointed as its president. This would allow the European Council to combine the position, with its powers, of both executive bodies into a single president of the European Union.

== Privileges of office ==
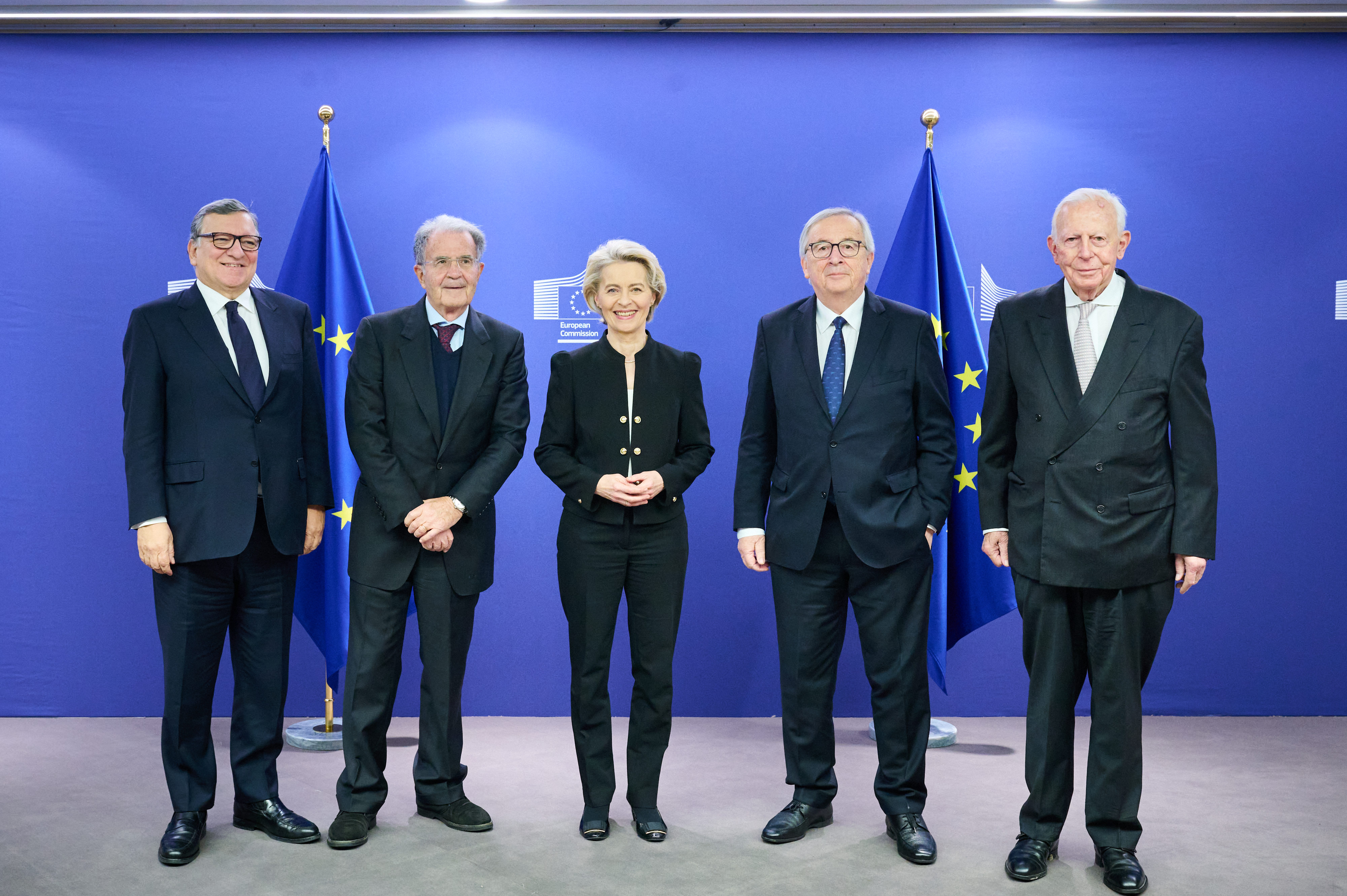
From left to right: Presidents Barroso, Prodi, Von der Leyen, Juncker and Santer in 2024

The basic monthly salary of the president is fixed at 138% of the top civil service grade which, in 2024, amounted to €34,420 per month or €413,040 per year plus an allowance for a residence equal to 15% of salary as well as other allowances including for children's schooling and household expenses.

== List of presidents ==
Signed
In force
Document
1951
1952
Paris Treaty
1957
1958
Rome treaties: EEC Treaty Euratom Treaty
1965
1967
Merger Treaty
2007
2009
Lisbon Treaty

Commission of the European Atomic Energy Community
Commission of the European Communities
European Commission

High Authority of the European Coal and Steel Community

Commission of the European Economic Community

The European Economic Community was established by the Treaty of Rome, presently known as the Treaty on the Functioning of the European Union; a founding treaty of the union, which explains that the enumeration of presidents which ends with the present position starts with the first president of the Commission of the European Economic Community. The European Union is also the legal successor of the European Economic Community, or the European Community as it was named between 1993 and 2009. The establishment of the European Union in 1993 upon the entry into force of the Maastricht Treaty (formally the Treaty on European Union) did not affect the name of the position.

Upon its entry into force in 2009, the Treaty of Lisbon renamed the Commission of the European Communities the European Commission, reflecting the de facto name as well as the fact that the European Communities pillar was abolished along with the rest of the pillar system.

Groups

- Christian Democrats / European People's Party
- Liberals / Liberal Democrats
- Socialists
- Progressive Democrats

No.	Portrait	President (Born–Died)	State	Took office	Left office	Party	Group	Electoral mandate	Commission	Ref.
1		Walter Hallstein (1901–1982)	West Germany	1 January 1958	5 July 1967	CDU	Christian Democrats	–	Hallstein I · II	
1		Walter Hallstein (1901–1982)	West Germany	9 years, 185 days		CDU	Christian Democrats	–	Hallstein I · II	
2		Jean Rey (1902–1983)	Belgium	6 July 1967	1 July 1970	PLP	Liberals	–	Rey	
2		Jean Rey (1902–1983)	Belgium	2 years, 361 days		PLP	Liberals	–	Rey	
3		Franco Maria Malfatti (1927–1991)	Italy	2 July 1970	21 March 1972	DC	Christian Democrats	–	Malfatti	
3		Franco Maria Malfatti (1927–1991)	Italy	1 year, 264 days		DC	Christian Democrats	–	Malfatti	
4		Sicco Mansholt (1908–1995)	Netherlands	22 March 1972	5 January 1973	PvdA	Socialists	–	Mansholt	
4		Sicco Mansholt (1908–1995)	Netherlands	290 days		PvdA	Socialists	–	Mansholt	
5		François-Xavier Ortoli (1925–2007)	France	6 January 1973	5 January 1977	UDR	Progressive Democrats	–	Ortoli	
5		François-Xavier Ortoli (1925–2007)	France	4 years		UDR	Progressive Democrats	–	Ortoli	
6		Roy Jenkins (1920–2003)	United Kingdom	6 January 1977	5 January 1981	Labour	Socialists	–	Jenkins	
6		Roy Jenkins (1920–2003)	United Kingdom	4 years		Labour	Socialists	1979	Jenkins	
7		Gaston Thorn (1928–2007)	Luxembourg	6 January 1981	5 January 1985	DP	Liberal Democrats	1979	Thorn	
7		Gaston Thorn (1928–2007)	Luxembourg	4 years		DP	Liberal Democrats	1979	Thorn	
8		Jacques Delors (1925–2023)	France	6 January 1985	22 January 1995	PS	Socialists	1984; 1989	Delors I · II · III	
8		Jacques Delors (1925–2023)	France	10 years, 17 days		PS	Socialists	1984; 1989	Delors I · II · III	
9		Jacques Santer (born 1937)	Luxembourg	23 January 1995	15 March 1999 (Note: Santer resigned before his mandate expired. His commission served in caretaker capacity under Marín till September. Replaced by Prodi, who completed Santer's mandate to 22 January 2000, when they were reappointed on their own mandate.)	CSV	European People's Party	1994	Santer	
9		Jacques Santer (born 1937)	Luxembourg	4 years, 51 days		CSV	European People's Party	1994	Santer	
–		Manuel Marín (1949–2017) acting	Spain	15 March 1999	15 September 1999	PSOE	Socialists	1994	Santer	
–		Manuel Marín (1949–2017) acting	Spain	185 days		PSOE	Socialists	1994	Santer	
10		Romano Prodi (born 1939)	Italy	16 September 1999	21 November 2004	Democrats	Liberal Democrats	1999	Prodi	
10		Romano Prodi (born 1939)	Italy	5 years, 66 days		Democrats	Liberal Democrats	1999	Prodi	
11		José Manuel Barroso (born 1956)	Portugal	22 November 2004	31 October 2014	PSD	European People's Party	2004; 2009	Barroso I · II	
11		José Manuel Barroso (born 1956)	Portugal	9 years, 344 days		PSD	European People's Party	2004; 2009	Barroso I · II	
12		Jean-Claude Juncker (born 1954)	Luxembourg	1 November 2014	30 November 2019	CSV	European People's Party	2014	Juncker	
12		Jean-Claude Juncker (born 1954)	Luxembourg	5 years, 29 days		CSV	European People's Party	2014	Juncker	
13		Ursula von der Leyen (born 1958)	Germany	1 December 2019	Incumbent	CDU	European People's Party	2019; 2024	Von der Leyen I · II	
13		Ursula von der Leyen (born 1958)	Germany	6 years, 352 days		CDU	European People's Party	2019; 2024	Von der Leyen I · II	

== See also ==
- Vice-President of the European Commission
- European Commissioner
- List of presidents of EU institutions
  - President of the European Parliament
  - President of the European Council
  - Presidency of the Council of the European Union
- President of the European Union

== Sources ==
- Eppink, Derk-Jan (2007). Life of a European Mandarin: Inside the Commission. Translated by Connerty, Ian (1st ed.). Tielt, Belgium: Lannoo. ISBN 978-90-209-7022-7.
- Hix, Simon (2008). What's wrong with the EU and how to fix it. Cambridge, United Kingdom: Polity. ISBN 978-0-7456-4205-5.
- Cotter, John; Butler, Graham (2024). "The President of the European Commission and the Power to Request a Commissioner's Resignation". Common Market Law Review. 61 (3): 593–622. doi:10.54648/cola2024044.
