= Gerard Huysmans =

Dutch politician

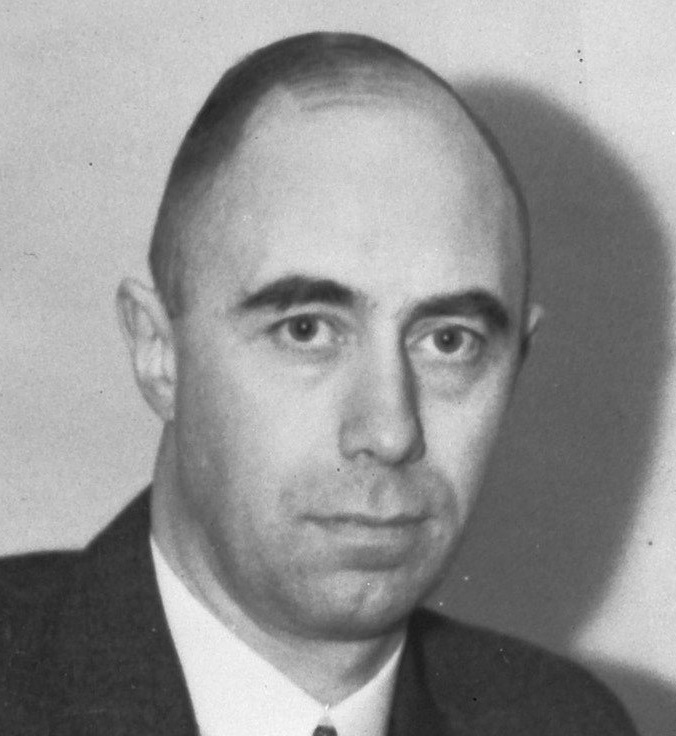
Huysmans in 1945

Gerardus Wilhelmus Maria Huijsmans (later known as Huysmans) (29 April 1902 – 18 March 1948) was a Dutch politician.

Huijsmans was born in Eindhoven. He was Dutch Minister for Finance in 1945 and Minister of the Economy from 1946 to 1948. He died in The Hague, aged 45.

== Sources ==
- HUIJSMANS, Gerardus Wilhelmus Maria (1902-1948) at historici.nl
