= Finn Olav Gundelach =

Danish diplomat (1925–1981)

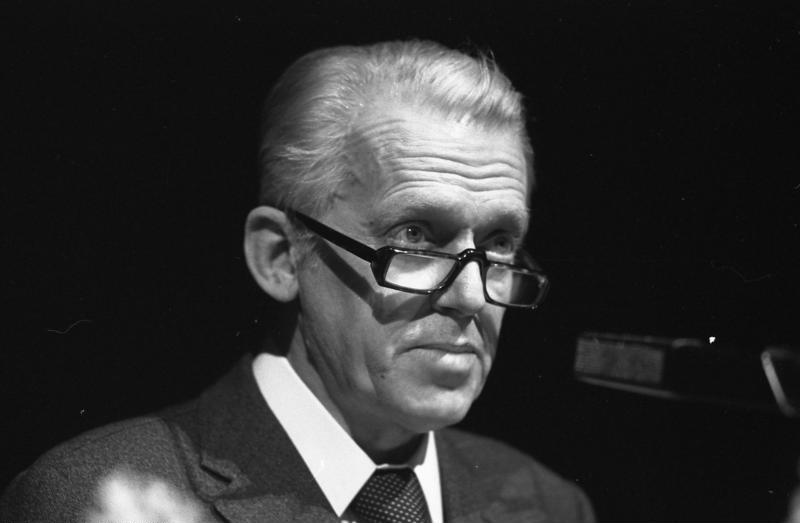
- Gundelach in 1980

Vice-President of the European Commission
- In office 6 January 1977 – 13 January 1981 Serving with Wilhelm Haferkamp and Henk Vredeling
- President: Roy Jenkins; Gaston Thorn

European Commissioner for Internal Market and Customs Union
- In office 6 January 1973 – 5 January 1977
- President: François-Xavier Ortoli; Roy Jenkins; Gaston Thorn
- Preceded by: Wilhelm Haferkamp
- Succeeded by: Étienne Davignon

Personal details
- Born: 23 April 1925
- Died: 13 January 1981 (aged 55)
- Education: University of Aarhus

Finn Olav Gundelach (23 April 1925 – 13 January 1981) was a Danish diplomat and European Commissioner who served as Vice-President of the European Commission from 6 January 1977 until his death on 13 January 1981.

Gundelach was educated from the University of Aarhus in 1951. From 1955 to 1959 he was the Danish ambassador to the United Nations. In 1959 he was named director of the trade branch of GATT and vice director of the entire GATT in 1965. He left GATT in 1967 in order to become Danish ambassador to the EC.

In 1973 he was named as the first Danish European Commissioner by prime minister Anker Jørgensen. He was commissioner from 6 January 1973 until his death in 1981 from a sudden heart attack.

Political offices
| Preceded by Wilhelm Haferkamp as European Commissioner for Internal Market and Energy | European Commissioner for the Internal Market and the Customs Union; 1973–1977 | Succeeded by Étienne Davignon as European Commissioner for the Internal Market, the Customs Union and Industrial Affairs |
| Preceded by - | Danish European Commissioner; 1973–1977 | Succeeded by Poul Dalsager |
