= François-Xavier Ortoli =

French politician (1925–2007)

His Excellency François-Xavier Ortoli
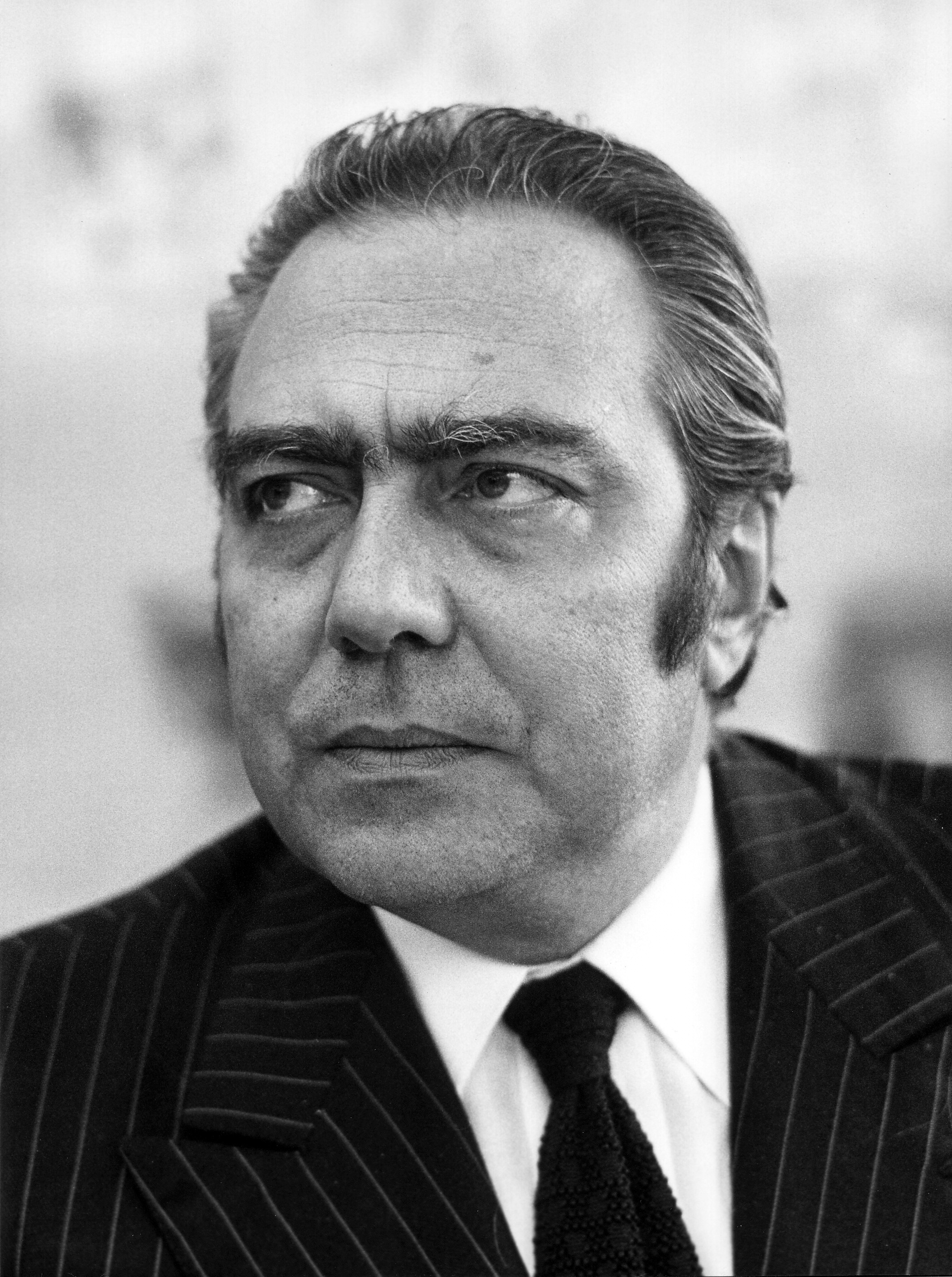
- Official portrait, 1973

President of the European Commission
- In office 5 January 1973 – 5 January 1977
- Vice President: Patrick Hillery
- Preceded by: Sicco Mansholt
- Succeeded by: Roy Jenkins

Minister of the Economy
- In office 4 April 1968 – 21 February 1969
- Prime Minister: Maurice Couve de Murville
- Preceded by: Maurice Couve de Murville
- Succeeded by: Valéry Giscard d'Estaing

Personal details
- Born: François-Xavier Ortoli; 16 February 1925 Ajaccio, Corsica, France
- Died: 30 November 2007 (aged 82) Paris, France
- Resting place: Père Lachaise Cemetery, Paris, France
- Party: European People's Party
- Other political affiliations: Union of Democrats for the Republic (1968–1976); Rally for the Republic (1976–2002); Union for a Popular Movement (2002–2007)
- Education: École nationale d'administration

François-Xavier Ortoli (French: [fʁɑ̃swa ɡzavje ɔʁtɔli]; 16 February 1925 – 30 November 2007) was a French politician who served as the fifth president of the European Commission from 1973 to 1977. He served as Minister of the Economy of France from 1968 to 1969.

Ortoli served with the Free French Forces during World War II and was decorated with the Croix de Guerre, Médaille militaire and Médaille de la Résistance. He served in various ministerial capacities in the 1968–1969 administration of Prime Minister of France Maurice Couve de Murville including Finance Minister. Ortoli was one of the two French European Commissioners from 1973 to 1985 holding various portfolios, serving as the fifth President of the European Commission between 1973 and 1977 leading the Ortoli Commission. He was later director of Marceau Investissements and President of Total.

Ortoli was the grandfather of Antoine-Xavier Troesch, an investment banker. Together with Étienne Davignon he attended the founding meeting of the European Round Table of Industrialists in Paris in 1983.

== See also ==
- List of Corsican people

Political offices
Preceded by Alain Peyrefitte	Minister of National Education of France; 1968	Succeeded by Edgar Faure
Preceded by Sicco Mansholt	President of the European Commission; 1973–1977	Succeeded by Roy Jenkins
Business positions
Preceded by René Granier de Lilliac	CEO of Total S.A. 1984–1990	Succeeded by Serge Tchuruk
