= List of European Commission portfolios =

A portfolio in the European Commission is an area of responsibility assigned to a European Commissioner, usually connected to one or several Directorates-General (DGs).

== Portfolios ==
=== Agriculture ===
The Commissioner for Agriculture and Rural Development is in charge of rural issues including most notably the controversial Common Agricultural Policy (CAP) which represents 44% of the EU budget. The post used to be combined with Fisheries in the Jenkins and Thorn Commissions. The related DG is the Directorate-General for Agriculture and Rural Development

	Name	Country	Period	Commission	Portfolio actual name
1	Sicco Mansholt	Netherlands	1958–1972	Hallstein Commission I & II, Rey Commission, Malfatti Commission	Agriculture (vice-president)
2	Carlo Scarascia-Mugnozza	Italy	1972–1973	Mansholt Commission	Agriculture
3	Pierre Lardinois	Netherlands	1973–1977	Ortoli Commission	Agriculture
4	Finn Olav Gundelach	Denmark	1977–1981	Jenkins Commission	Agriculture-Fisheries (vice-president)
4	Finn Olav Gundelach	Denmark	1981–1985	Thorn Commission	Agriculture
5	Poul Dalsager	Denmark	1981–1985	Thorn Commission	Agriculture
6	Frans Andriessen	Netherlands	1985–1989	Delors Commission I	Agriculture and Rural Development (vice-president)
7	Ray MacSharry	Ireland	1989–1992	Delors Commission II	Agriculture and Rural Development
8	René Steichen	Luxembourg	1992–1995	Delors Commission III	Agriculture and Rural Development
9	Franz Fischler	Austria	1995–1999	Santer Commission	Agriculture and Rural Development
9	Franz Fischler	Austria	1999–2004	Prodi Commission	Agriculture and Fisheries
10	Sandra Kalniete	Latvia	2004	Prodi Commission	Agriculture and Fisheries
11	Mariann Fischer Boel	Denmark	2004–2010	Barroso Commission I	Agriculture and Rural Development
12	Dacian Cioloş	Romania	2010–2014	Barroso Commission II	Agriculture and Rural Development
13	Phil Hogan	Ireland	2014–2019	Juncker Commission	Agriculture and Rural Development
14	Janusz Wojciechowski	Poland	2019-2024	Von der Leyen Commission	Agriculture
15	Christophe Hansen	Luxembourg	Incumbent	Von der Leyen Commission II	Agriculture and Food

=== Climate Action ===
The post of Commissioner for Climate Action was created in February 2010, being split from the environmental portfolio to focus on fighting climate change. The first Commissioner to take the post was Connie Hedegaard who headed the Directorate-General for Climate Action.

	Name	Country	Period	Commission	Portfolio actual name
1	Connie Hedegaard	Denmark	2010–2014	Barroso Commission II	Climate Action
2	Miguel Arias Cañete	Spain	2014–2019	Juncker Commission	Climate Action and Energy
3	Frans Timmermans	Netherlands	2019–2023	Von der Leyen Commission	Climate Action
4	Maroš Šefčovič (acting)	Slovakia	2023	Von der Leyen Commission	Climate Action
5	Wopke Hoekstra	Netherlands	Incumbent	Von der Leyen Commission I, Von der Leyen Commission II	Climate, Net Zero and Clean Growth

=== Competition ===
The Commissioner for Competition is the member responsible for commercial competition, company mergers, cartels, state aid, and anti-trust law. The position became the sole merger authority for the European Economic Area in September 1990. The Competition Commissioner is one of the most powerful positions in the commission and is notable in affecting global companies. For example, the commissioner has been pursued a number of high-profile cases against anticompetitive behaviour; such as the case against the merger of Sony – BMG, against Apple Inc. regarding iTunes, the ongoing case against Microsoft and in particular the GE-Honeywell merger attempt in 2001. In 2007, Neelie Kroes (then Competition Commissioner) was the only Commissioner to make Forbes Magazine's List of The World's 100 Most Powerful Women; she held position 59.

	Name	Country	Period	Commission	Portfolio actual name
1	Hans von der Groeben	West Germany	1958–1967	Hallstein Commission I & II	Competition
2	Maan Sassen	Netherlands	1967–1971	Rey Commission	Competition
3	Albert Borschette	Luxembourg	1970–1973	Malfatti Commission, Mansholt Commission	Competition and Regional Policy
3	Albert Borschette	Luxembourg	1973–1977	Ortoli Commission	Competition
4	Raymond Vouel	Luxembourg	1976–1981	Jenkins Commission	Competition
5	Frans Andriessen	Netherlands	1981–1985	Thorn Commission	Parliamentary Relations and Competition
6	Peter Sutherland	Ireland	1985–1989	Delors Commission I	Competition, social affairs and education
7	Sir Leon Brittan	United Kingdom	1989–1992	Delors Commission II	Competition and financial institutions (vice-president)
8	Karel Van Miert	Belgium	1993–1999	Delors Commission III, Santer Commission	Competition (vice-president)
9	Mario Monti	Italy	1999–2004	Prodi Commission	Competition
10	Neelie Kroes	Netherlands	2004–2010	Barroso Commission I	Competition
11	Joaquín Almunia	Spain	2010–2014	Barroso Commission II	Competition (vice-president)
12	Margrethe Vestager	Denmark	2014-2024	Juncker Commission, Von der Leyen Commission	Competition (Executive Vice-President)
13	Teresa Ribera	Spain	Incumbent	Von der Leyen Commission II	Competition (Executive Vice-President)

=== Development ===
The Commissioner for Development deals with promoting sustainable development in deprived regions (such as ACP countries and the EU's OCTs). It used to include humanitarian aid. The related DG is Directorate-General for International Partnerships

	Name	Country	Period	Commission	Portfolio actual name
1	Robert Lemaignen	France	1958–1962	Hallstein Commission I	Overseas Development
2	Henri Rochereau	France	1962–1967	Hallstein Commission II	Overseas Development
2	Henri Rochereau	France	1967–1970	Rey Commission	Development Assistance
3	Jean-François Deniau	France	1967–1970	Rey Commission	Foreign Trade, Enlargement and Assistance to developing countries
3	Jean-François Deniau	France	1970–1972	Malfatti Commission	External Relations and Development Aid
3	Jean-François Deniau	France	1972–1973	Mansholt Commission	Foreign Affairs and Development Aid
3	Jean-François Deniau	France	1973	Ortoli Commission	Development cooperation
4	Claude Cheysson	France	1973–1981	Ortoli Commission, Jenkins Commission	Development
4	Claude Cheysson	France	1981	Thorn Commission	Development
5	Edgard Pisani	France	1981–1984	Thorn Commission	Development
6	Lorenzo Natali	Italy	1985–1989	Delors Commission I	Cooperation, development affairs and enlargement (vice-president)
7	Filippo Maria Pandolfi	Italy	1989–1993	Delors Commission II	Science, research, development, telecommunications and innovation (vice-president)
7	Manuel Marin	Spain	1989–1992	Delors Commission II	Cooperation, development and fisheries (vice-president)
7	Manuel Marin	Spain	1993–1994	Delors Commission III	Cooperation, development and humanitarian aid (vice-president)
8	João de Deus Pinheiro	Portugal	1995–1999	Santer Commission	Relations with African, Caribbean, Pacific Countries, South Africa and the Lomé Convention
9	Poul Nielson	Denmark	1999–2004	Prodi Commission	Development and Humanitarian Aid
10	Joe Borg	Malta	2004	Prodi Commission	Development and Humanitarian Aid
11	Benita Ferrero-Waldner	Austria	2004–2010	Barroso Commission I	External Relations and European Neighbourhood Policy
12	Louis Michel	Belgium	2004–2009	Barroso Commission I	Development and Humanitarian Aid
13	Karel De Gucht	Belgium	2009–2010	Barroso Commission I	Development and Humanitarian Aid
14	Andris Piebalgs	Latvia	2010–2014	Barroso Commission II	Development
15	Neven Mimica	Croatia	2014–2019	Juncker Commission	International Cooperation and Development
16	Jutta Urpilainen	Finland	2019-2024	Von der Leyen Commission	International Partnerships
17	Jozef Síkela	Czech Republic	Incumbent	Von der Leyen Commission II	International Partnerships

=== Technology ===
The Commissioner for the Digital Agenda, previously the Commissioner for Information Society and Media, is responsible media and information issues such as telecoms and ICT.

2004–2010 Commissioner, Viviane Reding, found a relatively popular policy in seeking to lower roaming charges of mobile phones when travelling within the EU, stating: "For years, mobile roaming charges have remained unjustifiably high. We are therefore tackling one of the last borders within Europe's internal market". Her legislation to cap roaming charges was approved by the Parliament in April 2007 On 7 April 2006 the commission launched the new ".eu" TLD for websites for EU companies and citizens wishing to have a non-national European internet address. This has proved popular with 2.5 being registered by April 2007. It is now the seventh most popular TLD worldwide, and third in Europe (after .de and .uk)

In the previous Commission information society was linked with Enterprise (now linked with Industry).

	Name	Country	Period	Commission	Portfolio actual name
1	Fritz Hellwig	Germany	1967–1970	Rey Commission	Research and Technology, Distribution of Information and Joint Research Centre (vice-president)
2	Lorenzo Natali	Italy	1981–1985	Thorn Commission	Mediterranean Policy, Enlargement and Information (vice-president)
3	Karl-Heinz Narjes	Germany	1985–1988	Delors Commission I	Industry, information technology and science and research (vice-president)
4	Carlo Ripa di Meana	Italy	1985–1988	Delors Commission I	Institutional reforms, information policy, culture and tourism
5	Filippo Maria Pandolfi	Italy	1989–1993	Delors Commission II	Science, research, development, telecommunications and innovation (vice-president)
6	Martin Bangemann	Germany	1993–1994	Delors Commission III	Internal market, industrial affairs and ICT (vice-president)
7	Antonio Ruberti	Italy	1993–1994	Delors Commission III	Science, research, technological development and education (vice-president)
(6)	Martin Bangemann	Germany	1995–1999	Santer Commission	Industrial affairs, Information and Telecommunications Technologies
8	Marcelino Oreja	Spain	1995–1999	Santer Commission	Relations with the European Parliament, Culture, Audiovisual Policy
9	Erkki Liikanen	Finland	1999–2004	Prodi Commission	Enterprise and Information Society
10	Olli Rehn	Finland	2004	Prodi Commission	Enterprise and Information Society
11	Ján Figeľ	Slovakia	2004	Prodi Commission	Enterprise and Information Society
12	Viviane Reding	Luxembourg	2004–2010	Barroso Commission I	Information Society and Media
13	Neelie Kroes	Netherlands	2010–2014	Barroso Commission II	Digital Agenda (vice-president)
14	Andrus Ansip	Estonia	2014–2019	Juncker Commission	Digital Single Market (vice-president)
15	Maroš Šefčovič	Slovakia	2019	Juncker Commission	Digital Single Market (vice-president)
16	Margrethe Vestager	Denmark	2019-2024	Von der Leyen Commission	Europe Fit for Digital Age (Executive Vice-President)
17	Henna Virkkunen	Finland	Incumbent	Von der Leyen Commission II	Digital and Frontier Technologies (Executive Vice-President)

=== Economic and Financial Affairs, Taxation and Customs ===
The Commissioner for Economic and Financial Affairs is responsible for the EU's economic affairs including the euro. In the Juncker Commission, the post also acquired responsibility for taxation and anti-fraud protection.

There have been calls for a strengthened economic portfolio with Ségolène Royal suggesting that there should be an economic government for the eurozone and at the start of the first Barroso Commission Germany suggested an economic "super-commissioner" – which could see a change in this position. That idea, however, was dropped but the Enterprise and Industry Commissioner was strengthened in response.

	Name	Country	Period	Commission	Portfolio actual name
1	Robert Marjolin	France	1958–1967	Hallstein Commission I & II	Economics and Finance (vice-president)
2	Raymond Barre	France	1967–1970	Rey Commission	Economic and Finance, Statistical Office (vice-president)
2	Raymond Barre	France	1970–1972	Malfatti Commission, Mansholt Commission	Economic & Financial Affairs
3	Wilhelm Haferkamp	West Germany	1973–1977	Ortoli Commission	Economic and Finance, Credit and Investments (vice-president)
3	Henri François Simonet	Belgium	1973–1977	Ortoli Commission	Taxation, Energy (vice-president)
3	Finn Olav Gundelach	Denmark	1973–1977	Ortoli Commission	Internal Market, Customs Union
4	Richard Burke	Ireland	1977–1981	Jenkins Commission	Taxation, Consumer Affairs, Transport
4	Étienne Davignon	Belgium	1977–1981	Jenkins Commission	Internal Market, Customs Union, Industrial Affairs
4	François-Xavier Ortoli	France	1977–1985	Jenkins Commission	Economic and Financial Credit and Investments (vice-president)
4	François-Xavier Ortoli	France	1977–1985	Thorn Commission	Economic and Financial Credit and Investments (vice-president)
5	Christopher Tugendhat	United Kingdom	1981–1985	Thorn Commission	Budget and Financial Control, Financial Institutions and Taxation (vice-president)
5	Karl-Heinz Narjes	Germany	1981–1985	Thorn Commission	Internal Market, Industrial Innovation, Customs Union, the Environment, Consumer Protection and Nuclear Safety
5	Lord Cockfield	United Kingdom	1985–1989	Delors Commission I	Internal market, tax law and customs (vice-president)
6	Henning Christophersen	Denmark	1985–1989	Delors Commission I	Budget, financial control, personnel and administration (vice-president)
6	Henning Christophersen	Denmark	1989–1992	Delors Commission II	Economic & financial affairs and coordination of structural funds (vice-president)
7	Christiane Scrivener	France	1989–1992	Delors Commission II	Taxation and customs union
(6)	Henning Christophersen	Denmark	1992–1994	Delors Commission III	Economic and Financial Affairs (vice-president)
(7)	Christiane Scrivener	France	1992–1994	Delors Commission III	Taxation, customs union and consumer policies
8	Yves-Thibault de Silguy	France	1995–1999	Santer Commission	Economic and Financial Affairs
8	Mario Monti	Italy	1995–1999	Santer Commission	Internal Market, Services Customs and Taxation
9	Pedro Solbes	Spain	1999–2004	Prodi Commission	Economic and Monetary Affairs
10	Joaquín Almunia	Spain	2004	Prodi Commission	Economic and Monetary Affairs
11	Siim Kallas	Estonia	2004	Prodi Commission	Economic and Monetary Affairs
12	Joaquín Almunia	Spain	2004–2010	Barroso Commission I	Economic and Financial Affairs
12	László Kovács	Hungary	2004–2010	Barroso Commission I	Taxation and Customs Union
13	Olli Rehn	Finland	2010–2014	Barroso Commission II	Economic and Monetary Affairs and the Euro (vice-president)
14	Jyrki Katainen	Finland	2014	Barroso Commission II	Economic and Monetary Affairs and the Euro (vice-president)
15	Algirdas Šemeta	Lithuania	2010–2014	Barroso Commission II	Taxation and Customs Union, Audit and Anti-Fraud
16	Pierre Moscovici	France	2014–2019	Juncker Commission	Economic and Financial Affairs, Taxation and Customs
17	Paolo Gentiloni	Italy	2019-2024	Von der Leyen Commission	Economy
18	Valdis Dombrovskis	Latvia	Incumbent	Von der Leyen Commission II	Economy and Productivity (Executive Vice-President)

=== Education, Culture, Sport and Youth ===
The Commissioner for Education, Culture, Multilingualism and Youth is responsible for policies in education and training, youth, sport, civil society, culture, translation, interpretation and relations with the Office for Official Publications of the European Communities.

The post was enlarged since the Prodi Commission with the addition of training and multilingualism (The Directorate-General is still just Directorate-General for Education and Culture). When Romania joined the EU in 2007, multilingualism was handed over to the new Romanian commissioner. In its place the portfolio included youth, sport and civil society. Multilingualism was reintroduced in 2010 under Barroso's second Commission.

The commission has become increasingly active in education. The ERASMUS programme, which was established in 1987, is a student exchange programme promoting mobility of students between European universities. The Bologna process aims to create a European Higher Education Area where academic qualifications can be recognised across Europe. The European Institute of Technology is a proposed research university.

The previous portfolio to the current was Culture, merged with Audiovisual policy and EP relations.

	Name	Country	Period	Commission	Portfolio actual name
1	Carlo Ripa di Meana	Italy	1985–1989	Delors Commission I	Institutional reforms, information policy, culture and tourism
2	Jean Dondelinger	Luxembourg	1989–1992	Delors Commission II	Audiovisual and cultural affairs
3	Antonio Ruberti	Italy	1993–1994	Delors Commission III	Science, research, technological development and education (vice-president)
3	João de Deus Pinheiro	Portugal	1993–1994	Delors Commission III	Relations with Parliament, culture and audiovisual
4	Marcelino Oreja	Spain	1995–1999	Santer Commission	Relations with the European Parliament, Culture, Audiovisual Policy
5	Viviane Reding	Luxembourg	1999–2004	Prodi Commission	Education and Culture
6	Dalia Grybauskaitė	Lithuania	2004	Prodi Commission	Education and Culture
7	Ján Figeľ	Slovakia	2004–2009	Barroso Commission I	Education, Training and Culture
8	Maroš Šefčovič	Slovakia	2009–2010	Barroso Commission I	Education, Training and Culture
7	Leonard Orban	Romania	2004–2010	Barroso Commission I	Multilingualism
8	Androulla Vassiliou	Cyprus	2010–2014	Barroso Commission II	Education, Culture, Multilingualism and Youth
9	Tibor Navracsics	Hungary	2014–2019	Juncker Commission	Education, Culture, Youth and Sport
10	Mariya Gabriel	Bulgaria	2019–2023	Von der Leyen Commission	Innovation, Research, Culture, Education and Youth
11	Iliana Ivanova	Bulgaria	2023-2024	Von der Leyen Commission	Innovation, Research, Culture, Education and Youth
12	Ekaterina Zaharieva	Bulgaria	Incumbent	Von der Leyen Commission II	Startups, Research and Innovation

=== Employment and Social Affairs ===
The Commissioner for Employment, Social Affairs and Inclusion is responsible for matters including those relating to employment, discrimination and social affairs such as welfare. The post has had various alterations; under the first Barroso Commission it was known as Employment, Social Affairs and Equal Opportunities.

	Name	Country	Period	Commission	Portfolio actual name
1	Lionello Levi Sandri	Italy	1967–1972	Rey Commission	
2	Albert Coppé	Belgium	1972–1973	Malfatti Commission, Mansholt Commission	
3	Patrick Hillery	Ireland	1973–1977	Ortoli Commission	
4	Henk Vredeling	Netherlands	1977–1981	Jenkins Commission	Employment and Social Affairs (vice-president)
5	Ivor Richard	United Kingdom	1981–1985	Thorn Commission	Employment and Social Affairs
6	Alois Pfeiffer	West Germany	1985–1987	Delors Commission I	Economic affairs and employment
7	Peter Schmidhuber	West Germany	1987–1989	Delors Commission I	Economic affairs and employment
8	Peter Sutherland	Ireland	1985–1989	Delors Commission I	Competition, social affairs and education
9	Manuel Marin	Spain	1986–1989	Delors Commission I	Competition, social affairs and education (vice-president)
10	Vasso Papandreou	Greece	1989–1992	Delors Commission II	Employment, industrial relations and social affairs
11	Pádraig Flynn	Ireland	1993–1995	Delors Commission III	Social affairs and employment
11	Pádraig Flynn	Ireland	1994–1999	Santer Commission	Employment and Social Affairs and relations with the EESC
13	Anna Diamantopoulou	Greece	1999–2004	Prodi Commission	Employment and Social Affairs
14	Stavros Dimas	Greece	2004	Prodi Commission	Employment and Social Affairs
14	Vladimír Špidla	Czech Republic	2004–2010	Barroso Commission I	Employment, Social Affairs and Equal Opportunities
15	László Andor	Hungary	2010–2014	Barroso Commission II	Employment, Social Affairs and Inclusion
16	Marianne Thyssen	Belgium	2014–2019	Juncker Commission	Employment, Social Affairs, Skills and Labour Mobility
17	Nicolas Schmit	Luxembourg	2019-2024	Von der Leyen Commission	Jobs and Social Rights
18	Roxana Mînzatu	Romania	Incumbent	Von der Leyen Commission II	Social Rights and Skills, Quality Jobs and Preparedness

=== Energy ===
The Commissioner holds responsibility for the European Union's energy policy as well as nuclear issues (Euratom). The Directorate-General for this portfolio is shared with the Commissioner for Transport as the Directorate-General for Mobility and Transport.

The EU is an active supporter of the Kyoto Protocol, which it signed alongside its member-states. In March 2007 the Union committed itself to cut CO_{2} emissions by 20 percent by 2020.EU agrees on carbon dioxide cuts There is also a desire to reduce dependency on Russian energy supplies following the disputes between Russia and Belarus and Ukraine. In April 2007 five southern European countries signed a deal to build an oil pipeline from the Black Sea to Italy which will help diversify energy sources.

	Name	Country	Period	Commission	Portfolio actual name
1	Wilhelm Haferkamp	West Germany	1967–1973	Rey Commission, Malfatti Commission, Mansholt Commission	
2	Henri François Simonet	Belgium	1973–1977	Ortoli Commission	
3	Guido Brunner	West Germany	1977–1981	Jenkins Commission	Energy, Research, Science
4	Étienne Davignon	Belgium	1981–1985	Thorn Commission	Industrial Affairs, Energy, Research and Science (vice-president)
5	Nicolas Mosar	Luxembourg	1985–1989	Delors Commission I	Energy & Euratom
6	Antonio Cardoso e Cunha	Portugal	1989–1993	Delors Commission II	Energy, Euratom, small businesses; staff and translation
7	Marcelino Oreja	Spain	1993–1994	Delors Commission III	Transport and energy
8	Abel Matutes	Spain	1994–1995	Delors Commission III	Transport and energy
9	Christos Papoutsis	Greece	1995–1999	Santer Commission	Energy, Euratom Supply Agency, SMEs and Tourism
10	Loyola de Palacio	Spain	1999–2004	Prodi Commission	Inter-Institutional Relations and Administration, Transport and Energy (vice-president)
11	Andris Piebalgs	Latvia	2004–2010	Barroso Commission I	Energy
12	Günther Oettinger	Germany	2010–2014	Barroso Commission II	Energy (vice-president)
13	Miguel Arias Cañete	Spain	2014–2019	Juncker Commission	Climate Action and Energy
14	Maroš Šefčovič	Slovakia	2014–2019	Juncker Commission	Energy Union (vice-president)
15	Kadri Simson	Estonia	2019-2024	Von der Leyen Commission	Energy
16	Dan Jørgensen	Denmark	Incmubent	Von der Leyen Commission II	Energy and Housing

=== Enlargement, European Neighbourhood Policy and External Relations ===
The Commissioner for Enlargement and the European Neighbourhood Policy is concerned with foreign policy towards the EU's nearest neighbours. The enlargement portfolio began to be created out of the regionalised foreign policy posts. In particular the Santer Commission post for relations with central and eastern Europe as those countries began applying to join. The Neighbourhood Policy element was created in 2004 as part of the External Relations portfolio. When that portfolio was absorbed by the High Representative in 2009, Neighbourhood Policy was transferred to Trade and then to Enlargement in 2010 under the Second Barroso Commission.

Name	Country	Period	Commission	Portfolio actual name
Lorenzo Natali	Italy	1977–1981	Jenkins Commission	Enlargement, Environment, Nuclear Safety
Wilhelm Haferkamp	Germany	1977–1981	Jenkins Commission	External Relations (vice-president)
Wilhelm Haferkamp	Germany	1981–1985	Thorn Commission	External Relations (vice-president)
Lorenzo Natali	Italy	1981–1985	Thorn Commission	Mediterranean Policy, Enlargement and Information (vice-president)
Lorenzo Natali	Italy	1985–1989	Delors Commission I	Cooperation, development affairs and enlargement (vice-president)
Claude Cheysson	France	1985–1989	Delors Commission I	Mediterranean policy and north–south relations
Willy De Clercq	Belgium	1985–1989	Delors Commission I	External relations and trade policy
Frans Andriessen	Netherlands	1989–1992	Delors Commission II	External relations and trade policy (vice-president)
Abel Matutes	Spain	1989–1992	Delors Commission II	Mediterranean and Latin American policy
Hans van den Broek	Netherlands	1993–1994	Delors Commission III	External relations and enlargement
Leon Brittan	United Kingdom	1995–1999	Santer Commission	Commercial Policy and External Relations (vice-president)
Manuel Marin	Spain	1995–1999	Santer Commission	External Relations (vice-president)
João de Deus Pinheiro	Portugal	1995–1999	Santer Commission	Relations with African, Caribbean, Pacific Countries
Hans van den Broek	Netherlands	1995–1999	Santer Commission	Relations with central and eastern Europe, CFSP and the External Service, South Africa and the Lomé Convention
Chris Patten	United Kingdom	1999–2004	Prodi Commission	External Relations
Günter Verheugen	Germany	1999–2004	Prodi Commission	Enlargement
Janez Potočnik	Slovenia	2004	Prodi Commission	Enlargement
Olli Rehn	Finland	2004–2010	Barroso Commission I	Enlargement
Benita Ferrero-Waldner	Austria	2004–2010	Barroso Commission I	External Relations and European Neighbourhood Policy
Štefan Füle	Czech Republic	2010–2014	Barroso Commission II	Enlargement and European Neighbourhood Policy
Johannes Hahn	Austria	2014–2019	Juncker Commission	European Neighbourhood Policy and Enlargement Negotiations
Olivér Várhelyi	Hungary	2019-2024	Von der Leyen Commission	Neighbourhood and Enlargement
Marta Kos	Slovenia	Incumbent	Von der Leyen Commission II	Enlargement

=== Environment ===
The Commissioner for the Environment is responsible for protection of the European Union's environment. Specific actions relating to climate change are under the responsibility of the Climate Action commissioner as of 2010.

The EU has made a number of environmental moves, partially in regards to climate change. Most notably it signed the Kyoto Protocol in 1998, set up its Emission Trading Scheme in 2005 and is agreeing to unilaterally cut its emissions by 20% by 2020. (See: Energy policy of the European Union). Other policies include; the Natura 2000 a widespread and successful network of nature conservation sites, the Registration, Evaluation and Authorisation of Chemicals (REACH) directive requiring safety testing on widely used chemicals and the Water Framework Directive ensuring water quality reaches higher standards.

For more, see European Climate Change Programme, European Union Emission Trading Scheme, Renewable energy in the European Union and the Directorate-General for the Environment.

Name	Country	Period	Commission	Portfolio actual name
Lorenzo Natali	Italy	1977–1981	Jenkins Commission	Enlargement, Environment, Nuclear Safety
Karl-Heinz Narjes	Germany	1981–1985	Thorn Commission	Internal Market, Industrial Innovation, Customs Union, the Environment, Consumer Protection and Nuclear Safety
Stanley Clinton Davis	United Kingdom	1985–1989	Delors Commission I	Environment, consumer protection and transport
Carlo Ripa di Meana	Italy	1989–1993	Delors Commission II	Environment, nuclear safety and civil protection
Ioannis Paleokrassas	Greece	1993–1995	Delors Commission III	Environment, fisheries
Ritt Bjerregaard	Denmark	1995–1999	Santer Commission	Environment and nuclear security
Margot Wallström	Sweden	1999–2004	Prodi Commission	Environment
Stavros Dimas	Greece	2004–2010	Barroso Commission I	Environment
Janez Potočnik	Slovenia	2010–2014	Barroso Commission II	Environment
Karmenu Vella	Malta	2014–2019	Juncker Commission	Environment, Maritime Affairs and Fisheries
Virginijus Sinkevičius	Lithuania	2019-20224	Von der Leyen Commission	Environment, Oceans and Fisheries
Costas Kadis	Cyprus	Incumbent	Von der Leyen Commission II	Fisheries and Oceans

=== Budget and Human Resources ===
The Commissioner for Budget and Human Resources is primarily responsible for the management of the budget of the European Union and related financial issues except for budgetary discharge which falls under the Commissioner for administration commissioner. Previously simply for the budget, the position expanded under the Prodi Commission to include financial programming. The related DG is the Directorate-General for Budget.

Under Commissioner Grybauskaitė, Commissioner's 121.6 billion euro 2008 budget proposed that for the first time funding for sustainable growth (€57.2 billion) would be higher than that of the Common Agricultural Policy (€56.3 billion), traditionally the largest source of expenditure in the EU. There would be an increase in cohesion funds, energy and transport of 14%, research by 11% and lifelong learning by 9%. There would also be an increase in the administrative budget, aid to Kosovo and Palestinian institutions and funds towards the Galileo project. Group of EU states wary of 2008 budget plan

Name	Country	Period	Commission	Portfolio actual name
Albert Coppé	Belgium	1967–1973	Malfatti Commission, Mansholt Commission	
Wilhelm Haferkamp	Germany	1973–1977	Ortoli Commission	
Christopher Tugendhat	United Kingdom	1977–1981	Jenkins Commission	Budget and Financial Control, Financial Institutions
Christopher Tugendhat	United Kingdom	1981–1985	Thorn Commission	Budget and Financial Control, Financial Institutions and Taxation (vice-president)
Michael O'Kennedy	Ireland	1981–1982	Thorn Commission	Personnel and Administration
Richard Burke	Ireland	1982–1985	Thorn Commission	Personnel and Administration
Henning Christophersen	Denmark	1985–1989	Delors Commission I	Budget, financial control, personnel and administration
Antonio Cardoso e Cunha	Portugal	1989–1993	Delors Commission II	Energy, Euratom, small businesses; staff and translation
Peter Schmidhuber	Germany	1989–1993	Delors Commission II	Budget
Peter Schmidhuber	Germany	1993–1995	Delors Commission III	Budget, financial control and the cohesion fund
Erkki Liikanen	Finland	1995–1999	Santer Commission	Budget, Personnel and Administration
Michaele Schreyer	Germany	1999–2004	Prodi Commission	Budget
Marcos Kyprianou	Cyprus	2004	Prodi Commission	Budget
Dalia Grybauskaitė	Lithuania	2004–2009	Barroso Commission I	Financial Programming and the Budget
Algirdas Šemeta	Lithuania	2009–2010	Barroso Commission I	Financial Programming and the Budget
Janusz Lewandowski	Poland	2010–2014	Barroso Commission II	Financial Programming and the Budget
Jacek Dominik	Poland	2014	Barroso Commission II	Financial Programming and the Budget
Maroš Šefčovič	Slovakia	2010–2014	Barroso Commission II	Inter-Institutional Relations and Administration (vice-president)
Kristalina Georgieva	Bulgaria	2014–2016	Juncker Commission	Budget and Human Resources (vice-president)
Günther Oettinger	Germany	2017–2019	Juncker Commission	Budget and Human Resources
Johannes Hahn	Austria	2019-2024	Von der Leyen Commission	Budget and Administration
Piotr Serafin	Poland	Incumbent	Von der Leyen Commission II	Budget, Anti-Fraud and Public Administration

=== Financial Stability, Financial Services and Capital Markets Union ===
The Commissioner for Financial Stability, Financial Services and Capital Markets Union is responsible for banking and finance. It was a role created under the Juncker Commission.

Name	Country	Period	Commission	Portfolio actual name
Christopher Tugendhat	United Kingdom	1977–1981	Jenkins Commission	Budget and Financial Control, Financial Institutions
Christopher Tugendhat	United Kingdom	1981–1985	Thorn Commission	Budget and Financial Control, Financial Institutions and Taxation (vice-president)
Henning Christophersen	Denmark	1985–1989	Delors Commission I	Budget, financial control, personnel and administration
Abel Matutes	Spain	1986–1989	Delors Commission I	Credit, investments, financial instruments and small & medium-sized enterprises
Sir Leon Brittan	United Kingdom	1989–1992	Delors Commission II	Competition and financial institutions (vice-president)
Peter Schmidhuber	Germany	1993–1994	Delors Commission III	Budget, financial control and the cohesion fund
Anita Gradin	Sweden	1995–1999	Santer Commission	Immigration, Justice & Home Affairs, Financial Control, Anti-fraud and Relations with the European Ombudsman.
Jonathan Hill	United Kingdom	2014–2016	Juncker Commission	Financial Stability, Financial Services and Capital Markets Union
Valdis Dombrovskis	Latvia	2016–2019	Juncker Commission	Euro and Social Dialogue and Financial Stability, Financial Services and Capital Markets Union (vice-president)
Valdis Dombrovskis	Latvia	2019–2020	Von der Leyen Commission	Financial Markets
Mairead McGuinness	Ireland	2019-2024	Von der Leyen Commission	Financial Stability, Financial Services and Capital Markets Union
Maria Luís Albuquerque	Portugal	Incumbent	Von der Leyen Commission	Financial Services and the Savings and Investments Union

=== Institutional Reform, Democracy and Demography ===
Name	Country	Period	Commission	Portfolio actual name
Neil Kinnock	United Kingdom	1999–2004	Prodi Commission	Administrative reform (vice-president)
Carlo Ripa di Meana	Italy	1985–1989	Delors Commission I	Institutional reforms, information policy, culture and tourism
Raniero Vanni d'Archirafi	Italy	1993–1994	Delors Commission III	Institutional reform, internal market and enterprise
Dubravka Šuica	Croatia	2019-2024	Von der Leyen Commission	Democracy and Demography (Vice-President)

=== Health and Consumer Protection ===
The Commissioner for Health and Consumer Policy is responsible for matters of public health, food safety, animal health, welfare and consumer affairs. Between 2007 and 2010 it was split into a Commissioner for Health and a Commissioner for Consumer Protection – in order to give a portfolio for the incoming Bulgarian Commissioner. It was recombined under the second Barroso Commission.

Name	Country	Period	Commission	Portfolio actual name
Richard Burke	Ireland	1977–1981	Jenkins Commission	Taxation, Consumer Affairs, Transport
Karl-Heinz Narjes	Germany	1981–1985	Thorn Commission	Internal Market, Industrial Innovation, Customs Union, the Environment, Consumer Protection and Nuclear Safety
Stanley Clinton Davis	United Kingdom	1985–1989	Delors Commission I	Environment, consumer protection and transport
Grigoris Varfis	Greece	1986–1989	Delors Commission I	Relations with the European Parliament, regional policy and consumer protection
Karel Van Miert	Belgium	1989–1992	Delors Commission II	Transport and consumer protection
Christiane Scrivener	France	1992–1994	Delors Commission III	Taxation, customs union and consumer policies
Emma Bonino	Italy	1995–1999	Santer Commission	Consumer Policy, Fisheries and ECHO
David Byrne	Ireland	1999–2004	Prodi Commission	Health and Consumer Protection
Pavel Telička	Czech Republic	2004	Prodi Commission	Health and Consumer Protection
Markos Kyprianou	Cyprus	2004–2008	Barroso Commission I	Health
Androulla Vassiliou	Cyprus	2008–2010	Barroso Commission I	Health
Meglena Kuneva	Bulgaria	2007–2010	Barroso Commission I	Consumer Protection
John Dalli	Malta	2010–2012	Barroso Commission II	Health and Consumer Policy
Tonio Borg	Malta	2012–2014	Barroso Commission II	Health
Neven Mimica	Croatia	2013–2014	Barroso Commission II	Consumer Protection
Vytenis Andriukaitis	Lithuania	2014–2019	Juncker Commission	Health and Food Safety
Věra Jourová	Czech Republic	2014–2019	Juncker Commission	Justice and Consumers
Stella Kyriakidou	Cyprus	2019-2024	Von der Leyen Commission	Health and Food Safety
Olivér Várhelyi	Hungary	Incumbent	Von der Leyen Commission II	Health and Animal Welfare

=== High Representative ===
The High Representative became a Commissioner on 1 December 2009, replacing the External Relations Commissioner (see historical below). Although other external relations posts continue to exist, such as trade, the High Representative is the most senior foreign affairs post in the EU.

=== Home Affairs ===
The Commissioner for Home Affairs was created in 2010 by dividing the previous Justice, Freedom and Security portfolio into a security orientated post (DG HOME) and a post centred on justice, on individual and fundamental rights (DG JUST). Its DG is the Directorate-General for Migration and Home Affairs (DG HOME).

Name	Country	Period	Commission	Portfolio actual name
Anita Gradin	Sweden	1995–1999	Santer Commission	Immigration, Justice & Home Affairs, Financial Control, Anti-fraud and Relations with the European Ombudsman.
António Vitorino	Portugal	1999–2004	Prodi Commission	Justice and Home Affairs
Franco Frattini	Italy	2004–2008	Barroso Commission I	Justice, Freedom and Security (vice-president)
Jacques Barrot	France	2008–2009	Barroso Commission I	Justice, Freedom and Security (vice-president)
Cecilia Malmström	Sweden	2010–2014	Barroso Commission II	Home Affairs
Viviane Reding	Luxembourg	2010–2014	Barroso Commission II	Justice, Fundamental Rights and Citizenship (vice-president)
Martine Reicherts	Luxembourg	2014	Barroso Commission II	Justice, Fundamental Rights and Citizenship
Dimitris Avramopoulos	Greece	2014–2019	Juncker Commission	Migration, Home Affairs and Citizenship
Margaritis Schinas	Greece	2019–2024	Von der Leyen Commission	Promoting our European Way of Life (vice-president)
Ylva Johansson	Sweden	2019–2024	Von der Leyen Commission	Home Affairs
Magnus Brunner	Austria	incumbent	Von der Leyen Commission II	Internal Affairs and Migration

=== Industry and Entrepreneurship ===
The Commissioner for Enterprise and Industry post was enlarged from the Commissioner for Enterprise and Information Society portfolio in the Prodi Commission to include Industry. At the start of the first Barroso Commission, Germany, backed by Britain and France suggested an economic "super-commissioner" to fight for competitiveness. Although rejected, this idea though has been taken on by Verheugen, as the Enterprise and Industry portfolio was enlarged and was made a Vice President.

As Commissioner, he indicates his aim to increase the competitiveness of Europe, there is a separate Commissioner for Competition dealing with competition between companies within Europe. However, with the numerous economic portfolios, there is a degree of overlap which has been a matter of concern for him along with the purported difficulty of firing director-generals. This Commissioner also chairs the Competitiveness Council Commissioners Group and is the vice chair of the Group of Commissioners on the Lisbon Strategy. He is expected to be the European chair of the new Transatlantic Economic Council. The relevant DG is Directorate-General for Enterprise and Industry.

Name	Country	Period	Commission	Portfolio actual name
Étienne Davignon	Belgium	1977–1981	Jenkins Commission	Internal Market, Customs Union, Industrial Affairs
Étienne Davignon	Belgium	1981–1985	Thorn Commission	Industrial Affairs, Energy, Research and Science (vice-president)
Karl-Heinz Narjes	Germany	1981–1985	Thorn Commission	Internal Market, Industrial Innovation, Customs Union, the Environment, Consumer Protection and Nuclear Safety
Karl-Heinz Narjes	Germany	1985–1989	Delors Commission I	Industry, information technology and science and research (vice-president)
Abel Matutes	Spain	1986–1989	Delors Commission I	Credit, investments, financial instruments and small & medium-sized enterprises
Martin Bangemann	Germany	1989–1992	Delors Commission II	Internal market and industrial affairs (vice-president)
Antonio Cardoso e Cunha	Portugal	1989–1992	Delors Commission II	Energy, Euratom, small businesses; staff and translation
Vasso Papandreou	Greece	1989–1992	Delors Commission II	Employment, industrial relations and social affairs
Martin Bangemann	Germany	1993–1994	Delors Commission III	Internal market, industrial affairs and ICT (vice-president)
Raniero Vanni d'Archirafi	Italy	1993–1994	Delors Commission III	Institutional reform, internal market and enterprise
Martin Bangemann	Germany	1995–1999	Santer Commission	Industrial affairs, Information & Telecommunications Technologies
Christos Papoutsis	Greece	1995–1999	Santer Commission	Energy, Euratom Supply Agency, SMEs and Tourism
Erkki Liikanen	Finland	1999–2004	Prodi Commission	Enterprise and Information Society
Olli Rehn	Finland	2004	Prodi Commission	Enterprise and Information Society
Ján Figeľ	Slovakia	2004	Prodi Commission	Enterprise and Information Society
Günter Verheugen	Germany	2004–2010	Barroso Commission I	Enterprise and Industry (vice-president)
Antonio Tajani	Italy	2010–2014	Barroso Commission II	Industry and Entrepreneurship (vice-president)
Ferdinando Nelli Feroci	Italy	2014	Barroso Commission II	Industry and Entrepreneurship
Elżbieta Bieńkowska	Poland	2014–2019	Juncker Commission	Internal Market, Industry, Entrepreneurship and SMEs
Thierry Breton	France	2019-2024	Von der Leyen Commission	Internal Market
Stéphane Séjourné	France	Incumbent	Von der Leyen Commission II	Prosperity and Industrial Strategy

=== Internal Market ===
The Commissioner for Internal Market and Services concerned the development of the 480-million-strong European single market, promoting free movement of people, goods, services and capital. The related DG is Directorate-General for Internal Market and Services and it is also related to the Office for Harmonization in the Internal Market.

Commissioner Frits Bolkestein (Netherlands) served in the Prodi Commission between 1999 and 2004. In addition to holding the Internal Market portfolio he also held Taxation and Customs Union. Bolkestein is most notable for the Directive on services in the internal market, which is commonly called the "Bolkestein Directive". The directive aimed at enabling a company from a one member-state to recruit workers in another member-state under the law of the company's home state. It was to help the development of the internal market for services, the development of which has lagged behind that for goods. However, there was a great deal of concern about its effect on social standards and welfare, triggering competition between various parts of Europe. This led to significant protests across Europe against the directive including a notable protest at the European Parliament in Strasbourg by port workers which led to damage to the building. MEPs eventually reached a compromise on the text and the Parliament adopted it on 12 December 2006; 2 years after Bolkestein left office, under the Barroso Commission.

The portfolio was merged in 2014 with the one for Industry and Entrepreneurship.

Name	Country	Period	Commission	Portfolio actual name
Piero Malvestiti	Italy	1958–1959	Hallstein Commission I	
Giuseppe Caron	Italy	1959–1963	Hallstein Commission I & II	
Guido Colonna di Paliano	Italy	1964–1967	Hallstein Commission II	
Hans von der Groeben	West Germany	1967–1970	Rey Commission	
Wilhelm Haferkamp	West Germany	1970–1973	Malfatti Commission, Mansholt Commission	
Finn Olav Gundelach	Denmark	1973–1977	Ortoli Commission	
Étienne Davignon	Belgium	1977–1981	Jenkins Commission	Internal Market, Customs Union, Industrial Affairs
Karl-Heinz Narjes	Germany	1981–1985	Thorn Commission	Internal Market, Industrial Innovation, Customs Union, the Environment, Consumer Protection and Nuclear Safety
Lord Cockfield	United Kingdom	1985–1989	Delors Commission I	Internal market, tax law and customs
Martin Bangemann	Germany	1989–1992	Delors Commission II	Internal market and industrial affairs (vice-president)
Martin Bangemann	Germany	1993–1994	Delors Commission III	Internal market, industrial affairs and ICT (vice-president)
Raniero Vanni d'Archirafi	Italy	1993–1994	Delors Commission III	Institutional reform, internal market and enterprise
Mario Monti	Italy	1994–1999	Santer Commission	Internal Market, Services, Customs and Taxation
Frits Bolkestein	Netherlands	1999–2004	Prodi Commission	Internal Market
Charlie McCreevy	Ireland	2004–2010	Barroso Commission I	Internal Market and Services
Michel Barnier	France	2010–2014	Barroso Commission II	Internal Market and Services (vice-president)
Elżbieta Bieńkowska	Poland	2014–2019	Juncker Commission	Internal Market, Industry, Entrepreneurship and SMEs
Thierry Breton	France	2019-2024	Von der Leyen Commission	Internal Market
Stéphane Séjourné	France	Incumbent	Von der Leyen Commission II	Prosperity and Industrial Strategy

=== International Cooperation, Humanitarian Aid, Civil Protection and Crisis Management ===
The Commissioner for International Cooperation, Humanitarian Aid and Crisis Response was created under the second Barroso Commission in 2010 . It deals in party with dealing with humanitarian disasters and humanitarian aid: the EU is the largest supplier of aid in the world.

Name	Country	Period	Commission	Portfolio actual name
Robert Lemaignen	France	1958–1962	Hallstein Commission	
Henri Rochereau	France	1962–1970	Hallstein Commission, Rey Commission	
Jean-François Deniau	France	1967–1973	Rey Commission, Malfatti Commission, Mansholt Commission	
Claude Cheysson	France	1973–1981	Ortoli Commission, Jenkins Commission, Thorn Commission	
Edgard Pisani	France	1981–1985	Thorn Commission	
Lorenzo Natali	Italy	1985–1989	Delors Commission I	Cooperation, development affairs and enlargement (vice-president)
Carlo Ripa di Meana	Italy	1989–1992	Delors Commission II	Environment, nuclear safety and civil protection
Manuel Marin	Spain	1989–1992	Delors Commission II	Cooperation, development and fisheries (vice-president)
Manuel Marin	Spain	1992–1994	Delors Commission III	Cooperation, development and humanitarian aid
João de Deus Pinheiro	Portugal	1995–1999	Santer Commission	Relations with African, Caribbean, Pacific Countries, South Africa and the Lomé Convention
Emma Bonino	Italy	1995–1999	Santer Commission	Consumer Policy, Fisheries and ECHO
Poul Nielson	Denmark	1999–2004	Prodi Commission	Development and Humanitarian Aid
Joe Borg	Malta	2004	Prodi Commission	Development and Humanitarian Aid
Benita Ferrero-Waldner	Austria	2004–2010	Barroso Commission I	External Relations and European Neighbourhood Policy
Louis Michel	Belgium	2004–2009	Barroso Commission I	Development and Humanitarian Aid
Karel De Gucht	Belgium	2009–2010	Barroso Commission I	Development and Humanitarian Aid
Kristalina Georgieva	Bulgaria	2010–2014	Barroso Commission II	International Cooperation, Humanitarian Aid and Crisis Response
Christos Stylianides	Cyprus	2014–2019	Juncker Commission	Humanitarian Aid and Crisis Management
Janez Lenarčič	Slovenia	2019-2024	Von der Leyen Commission	Crisis Management
Hadja Lahbib	Belgium	Incumbent	Von der Leyen Commission II	Preparedness and Crisis Management

=== Interinstitutional Relations and Foresight ===
The Vice President of the European Commission for Interinstitutional Relations and Foresight is responsible for the administration of the commission, including management of some of the commission's Internal Services; in particular consolidation of administrative reform, personnel and administration, European Schools and security. The Commissioner is also responsible for the following departments; the Directorate-General for Personnel and Administration, the Office for the Administration and Payment of Individual Entitlement, the Directorate-General for Informatics, the Office of Infrastructure and Logistics, and relations with the European Personnel Selection Office. The current Vice President is Maroš Šefčovič.

Prior to 2010 it was also responsible for Audit and Anti-Fraud, now merged with taxation, but gain responsibility for relations with the other EU institutions.

Name	Country	Period	Commission	Portfolio actual name
Frans Andriessen	Netherlands	1981–1985	Thorn Commission	Parliamentary Relations and Competition
Michael O'Kennedy	Ireland	1981–1982	Thorn Commission	Personnel and Administration
Richard Burke	Ireland	1982–1985	Thorn Commission	Personnel and Administration
Henning Christophersen	Denmark	1985–1988	Delors Commission I	Budget, financial control, personnel and administration
Grigoris Varfis	Greece	1986–1988	Delors Commission I	Relations with the European Parliament, regional policy and consumer protection
Antonio Cardoso e Cunha	Portugal	1989–1993	Delors Commission II	Energy, Euratom, small businesses; staff and translation
João de Deus Pinheiro	Portugal	1993–1994	Delors Commission III	Relations with Parliament, culture and audiovisual
Erkki Liikanen	Finland	1995–1999	Santer Commission	Budget, Personnel and Administration
Marcelino Oreja	Spain	1995–1999	Santer Commission	Relations with the European Parliament, Culture, Audiovisual Policy
Anita Gradin	Sweden	1995–1999	Santer Commission	Immigration, Justice & Home Affairs, Financial Control, Anti-fraud and Relations with the European Ombudsman.
Loyola de Palacio	Spain	1999–2004	Prodi Commission	European Commissioner for Interinstitutional Relations and Administration, Transport and Energy (vice-president)
Margot Wallström	Sweden		Barroso Commission I	Institutional Relations and Communication Strategy (First Vice-President)
Siim Kallas	Estonia	2004–2009	Barroso Commission I	Administrative Affairs, Audit and Anti-Fraud
Maroš Šefčovič	Slovakia	2010–2014	Barroso Commission II	Interinstitutional Relations and Administration (vice-president)
Frans Timmermans	Netherlands	2014–2019	Juncker Commission	Better Regulation, Interinstitutional Relations, Rule of Law and Charter of Fundamental Rights (First Vice-President)
Maroš Šefčovič	Slovakia	Incumbent	Von der Leyen Commission,Von der Leyen Commission II	Until 2024: Interinstitutional Relations and Foresight (Vice-President), Since 2024: Interinstitutional Relations and Transparency

=== Justice, Fundamental Rights and Citizenship ===
The Commissioner for Justice, Fundamental Rights and Citizenship was created in 2010 by dividing the previous Justice, Freedom and Security portfolio into a security orientated post and a justice and fundamental rights orientated post. The portfolio was then renamed into Justice, Consumers and Gender Equality under the Juncker Commission.

Name	Country	Period	Commission	Portfolio actual name
Anita Gradin	Sweden	1995–1999	Santer Commission	Immigration, Justice & Home Affairs, Financial Control, Anti-fraud and Relations with the European Ombudsman.
António Vitorino	Portugal	1999–2004	Prodi Commission	Justice and Home Affairs
Franco Frattini	Italy	2004–2008	Barroso Commission I	Justice, Freedom and Security (Vice-President)
Jacques Barrot	France	2008–2009	Barroso Commission I	Justice, Freedom and Security (Vice-President)
Viviane Reding	Luxembourg	2010–2014	Barroso Commission II	Justice, Fundamental Rights and Citizenship (Vice-President)
Frans Timmermans	Netherlands	2014–2019	Juncker Commission	Better Regulation, Inter-Institutional Relations, Rule of Law and Charter of Fundamental Rights (First Vice-President)
Věra Jourová	Czech Republic	2014–2024	Juncker Commission	Justice, Consumers and Gender Equality
Věra Jourová	Czech Republic	2014–2024	Von der Leyen Commission I	Values and Transparency (Vice-President)
Didier Reynders	Belgium	2019–2024	Von der Leyen Commission I	Justice
Helena Dalli	Malta	2019–2024	Von der Leyen Commission I	Equality
Hadja Lahbib	Belgium	Incumbent	Von der Leyen Commission II	Equality
Michael McGrath	Ireland	Incumbent	Von der Leyen Commission II	Democracy, Justice, the Rule of Law and Consumer Protection

=== Maritime Affairs and Fisheries ===
The Maritime affairs and Fisheries Commissioner is responsible for policies such as the Common Fisheries Policy, which is largely a competence of the EU rather than the members. The Union has 66,000 km of coastline and the largest Exclusive Economic Zone in the world, covering 25 million km^{2}.

On 7 June 2006 the Commission published a green paper for a Maritime Policy and consultation will end in June 2007. The document addresses a number of issues such as sustainable development, protection of the environment, skills and employment, technology and resources, coastal safety and tourism, financial support and heritage. The Commission came under fire in May 2007 for not penalise French fishermen after over-fishing the threatened bluefin tuna by 65% while backing penalties on Irish fishermen for over-fishing mackerel.

Name	Country	Period	Commission	Portfolio actual name
Finn Olav Gundelach	Denmark	1977–1981	Jenkins Commission	Agriculture-Fisheries (vice-president)
Giorgos Kontogeorgis	Greece	1981–1985	Thorn Commission	Transport, Fisheries and Tourism
Frans Andriessen	Netherlands	1985–1989	Delors Commission I	Agriculture and fisheries (vice-president)
António Cardoso e Cunha	Portugal	1986–1989	Delors Commission I	Fisheries
Manuel Marin	Spain	1989–1992	Delors Commission II	Cooperation, development and fisheries (vice-president)
Ioannis Paleokrassas	Greece	1993–1995	Delors Commission III	Environment, fisheries
Franz Fischler	Austria	1999–2004	Prodi Commission	Agriculture and Fisheries
Sandra Kalniete	Latvia	2004	Prodi Commission	Agriculture and Fisheries
Joe Borg	Malta	2004–2010	Barroso Commission I	Fisheries and Maritime Affairs
Maria Damanaki	Greece	2010–2014	Barroso Commission II	Maritime Affairs and Fisheries
Karmenu Vella	Malta	2014–2019	Juncker Commission	Environment, Maritime Affairs and Fisheries
Virginijus Sinkevičius	Lithuania	2019–2024	Von der Leyen Commission	Environment, Oceans and Fisheries
Costas Kadis		Incumbent	Von der Leyen Commission II	Fisheries and Oceans

=== Regional Policy and Cohesion ===
The Regional Policy Commissioner, occasional Regional Affairs Commissioner, is responsible for managing the regional policy of the EU which takes up a third of the EU's budget; it includes the European Regional Development Fund, Structural Funds and Cohesion Funds, Instrument for Structural Policies for Pre-Accession and the European Social Fund. The related DG is Directorate-General for Regional Policy.

Name	Country	Period	Commission	Portfolio actual name
Hans von der Groeben	Germany	1967–1970	Rey Commission	
Albert Borschette	Luxembourg	1970–1973	Malfatti Commission, Mansholt Commission	
George Thomson	United Kingdom	1973–1977	Ortoli Commission	
Antonio Giolitti	Italy	1977–1985	Jenkins Commission, Thorn Commission	Regional Policy
Grigoris Varfis	Greece	1985–1989	Delors Commission I	Relations with the European Parliament, regional policy and consumer protection
Henning Christophersen	Denmark	1985–1989	Delors Commission I	Budget, financial control, personnel and administration (vice-president)
Bruce Millan	United Kingdom	1989–1992	Delors Commission II	Regional Policy
Bruce Millan	United Kingdom	1993–1994	Delors Commission III	Regional Policy and Cohesion
Peter Schmidhuber	Germany	1993–1994	Delors Commission III	Budget, financial control and the cohesion fund
Monika Wulf-Mathies	Germany	1994–1999	Santer Commission	Regional Policy
Michel Barnier	France	1999–2004	Prodi Commission	Regional Policy
Jacques Barrot	France	2004	Prodi Commission	Regional Policy
Péter Balázs	Hungary	2004	Prodi Commission	Regional Policy
Danuta Hübner	Poland	2004–2009	Barroso Commission I	Regional Policy
Paweł Samecki	Poland	2009–2010	Barroso Commission I	Regional Policy
Johannes Hahn	Austria	2010–2014	Barroso Commission II	Regional Policy
Corina Crețu	Romania	2014–2019	Juncker Commission	Regional Policy
Elisa Ferreira	Portugal	2019–2024	Von der Leyen Commission I	Cohesion and Reforms
Raffaele Fitto	Italy	Incumbent	Von der Leyen Commission II	Cohesion and Reforms

=== Research, Innovation and Science ===
The name has had several variations: under the first Barroso Commission it was Science and Research, under Prodi it was simply "Research", Santer was "Research, Science and Technology" and under Delors it was combined with others as "Industry, information technology and science and research" and other various names and combinations prior. The related DG is the Directorate-General for Research.

The 2004–2010 Commissioner, Potočnik, aimed to create a European Research Area.

Name	Country	Period	Commission	Portfolio actual name
Fritz Hellwig	West Germany	1967–1970	Rey Commission	
Ralf Dahrendorf	West Germany	1973–1977	Ortoli Commission	
Guido Brunner	West Germany	1977–1981	Jenkins Commission	Energy, Research, Science
Étienne Davignon	Belgium	1981–1985	Thorn Commission	Industrial Affairs, Energy, Research and Science (vice-president)
Karl-Heinz Narjes	Germany	1985–1989	Delors Commission I	Industry, information technology and science and research (vice-president)
Filippo Maria Pandolfi	Italy	1989–1993	Delors Commission II	Science, research, development, telecommunications and innovation
Antonio Ruberti	Italy	1993–1995	Delors Commission III	Science, research, technological development and education (vice-president)
Édith Cresson	France	1995–1999	Santer Commission	Research, Science and Technology
Philippe Busquin	Belgium	1999–2004	Prodi Commission	Research
Louis Michel	Belgium	2004	Prodi Commission	Research
Janez Potočnik	Slovenia	2004–2010	Barroso Commission I	Science and Research
Máire Geoghegan-Quinn	Ireland	2010–2014	Barroso Commission II	Research, Innovation and Science
Carlos Moedas	Portugal	2014–2019	Juncker Commission	Research, Science and Innovation
Mariya Gabriel	Bulgaria	2019–2024	Von der Leyen Commission	Innovation and Youth
Maroš Šefčovič	Slovakia		Von der Leyen Commission	Interinstitutional Relations and Foresight (Vice-President)

=== Defence Union ===
The Commissioner for Security Union was created in 2016.

Name	Country	Period	Commission	Portfolio actual name
Franco Frattini	Italy	2004–2008	Barroso Commission I	Justice, Freedom and Security (vice-president)
Jacques Barrot	France	2008–2009	Barroso Commission I	Justice, Freedom and Security (vice-president)
Julian King	United Kingdom	2016–2019	Juncker Commission	Security Union
Margaritis Schinas	Greece	2019–2024	Von der Leyen Commission	Protecting our European Way of Life (vice-president)

=== Statistics, Audit and Anti-Fraud ===
The Commissioner for Taxation, Customs, Statistics, Audit and Anti-Fraud is responsible for the EU's customs union and taxation policy. The European Union has had a customs union since the creation of the European Economic Community and that union extends to the non-EU members of the European Economic Area and to Turkey, Andorra and San Marino. Since 2010 it gained responsibility for audit (budgetary discharge, internal audit, counter fraud): in particular the Internal Audit Service and the European Anti-fraud Office.

Name	Country	Period	Commission	Portfolio actual name
Anita Gradin	Sweden	1995–1999	Santer Commission	Immigration, Justice & Home Affairs, Financial Control, Anti-fraud and Relations with the European Ombudsman.
Frits Bolkestein	Netherlands	1999–2004	Prodi Commission	Internal Market
Neil Kinnock	United Kingdom	1999–2004	Prodi Commission	Administrative reform
László Kovács	Hungary	2004–2009	Barroso Commission I	Taxation and Customs Union
Siim Kallas	Estonia	2004–2010	Barroso Commission I	Administrative Affairs, Audit and Anti-Fraud
Algirdas Šemeta	Lithuania	2010–2014	Barroso Commission II	Taxation and Customs Union, Audit and Anti-Fraud
Pierre Moscovici	France	2014–2019	Juncker Commission	Economic and Financial Affairs, Taxation and Customs
Paolo Gentiloni	Italy	2019 Onwards	Von der Leyen Commission	Economy
Didier Reynders	Belgium	nominated	Von der Leyen Commission	Justice

=== Trade ===
The Commissioner for Trade is responsible for the EU's external trade policy. Due to the size of the European economy, being the world's largest market and having a huge slice of world trade, this position can be very important in dealing with other world economic powers such as China or the United States. Former Commissioner Leon Brittan commented that "Frankly, it is more important than most [national] cabinet jobs". The Commissioner leads Europe in organisations such as the World Trade Organization (WTO). Concluding WTO talks after the collapse of the Doha Development Round has been a contentious point, with the EU not willing to cut agricultural subsidies without similar action by the United States. The related DG is Directorate-General for Trade.

Name	Country	Period	Commission	Portfolio actual name
Willy De Clercq	Belgium	1985–1989	Delors Commission I	External relations and trade policy
Frans Andriessen	Netherlands	1989–1992	Delors Commission II	External relations and trade policy (vice-president)
Leon Brittan	United Kingdom	1992–1994	Delors Commission III	External economic affairs and trade policy (vice-president)
Leon Brittan	United Kingdom	1994–1999	Santer Commission	Commercial Policy and External Relations (vice-president)
Pascal Lamy	France	1999–2004	Prodi Commission	Trade
Danuta Hübner	Poland	2004	Prodi Commission	Trade
Peter Mandelson	United Kingdom	2004–2008	Barroso Commission I	Trade
Catherine Ashton	United Kingdom	2008–2010	Barroso Commission I	Trade
Karel De Gucht	Belgium	2010–2014	Barroso Commission II	Trade
Cecilia Malmström	Sweden	2014–2019	Juncker Commission	Trade
Phil Hogan	Ireland	2019–2020	Von der Leyen Commission	Trade
Valdis Dombrovskis	Latvia	2020 Onwards	Von der Leyen Commission	Trade

=== Transport ===
The portfolio is responsible for the development of transport infrastructure in the EU such as road and rail networks but also navigation systems such as the Galileo positioning system.

Name	Country	Period	Commission	Portfolio actual name
Michel Rasquin	Luxembourg	1958	Hallstein Commission	
Lambert Schaus	Luxembourg	1958–1967	Hallstein Commission	
Victor Bodson	Luxembourg	1967–1970	Rey Commission	
Albert Coppé	Belgium	1970–1973	Malfatti Commission, Mansholt Commission	
Carlo Scarascia-Mugnozza	Italy	1973–1977	Ortoli Commission	
Richard Burke	Ireland	1977–1981	Jenkins Commission	Taxation, Consumer Affairs, Transport
Giorgos Kontogeorgis	Greece	1981–1985	Thorn Commission	Transport, Fisheries and Tourism
Stanley Clinton Davis	United Kingdom	1985–1989	Delors Commission I	Environment, Consumer Protection and Transport
Karel Van Miert	Belgium	1989–1992	Delors Commission II	Transport and Consumer Protection
Abel Matutes	Spain	1993–1994	Delors Commission III	Transport and Energy
Marcelino Oreja	Spain	1994–1995	Delors Commission III	Transport and Energy
Neil Kinnock	United Kingdom	1995–1999	Santer Commission	Transport, including TEN
Loyola de Palacio	Spain	1999–2004	Prodi Commission	Inter-Institutional Relations and Administration, Transport and Energy (vice-president)
Jacques Barrot	France	2004–2008	Barroso Commission I	Transport
Antonio Tajani	Italy	2008–2010	Barroso Commission I	Transport (vice-president)
Siim Kallas	Estonia	2010–2014	Barroso Commission II	Transport (vice-president)
Violeta Bulc	Slovenia	2014–2019	Juncker Commission	Transport
Adina Ioana Vălean	Romania	2019 Onwards	Von der Leyen Commission	Transport

== Historical portfolios ==
Many portfolios have been combined and split under different president's, below is a few of the previous posts that have since been abolished.

=== Administrative Affairs, Audit and Anti-Fraud ===
The Commissioner for Administrative Affairs, Audit and Anti-Fraud was in the first Barroso Commission and was responsible for the commission's internal administration and anti-fraud efforts.

Its administrative duties included management of some of the commission's Internal Services; in particular consolidation of administrative reform, personnel and administration, European Schools and security. The Commissioner is also responsible for the following departments; the Directorate-General for Personnel and Administration, the Office for the Administration and Payment of Individual Entitlement, the Directorate-General for Informatics, the Office of Infrastructure and Logistics, and relations with the European Personnel Selection Office. Its other responsibilities were for audit (budgetary discharge, internal audit, counter fraud): in particular the Internal Audit Service and the European Anti-fraud Office.

Name	Country	Period	Commission
Michael O'Kennedy	Ireland	1981–1982	Thorn Commission
Richard Burke	Ireland	1982–1985	Thorn Commission
Henning Christophersen	Denmark	1985–1988	Delors Commission
Peter Schmidhuber	Germany	1988–1994	Delors Commission
Erkki Liikanen	Finland	1994–1999	Santer Commission
Neil Kinnock	United Kingdom	1999–2004	Prodi Commission (Audit)
Siim Kallas	Estonia	2004–2009	Barroso Commission

=== Administrative Reform ===
A position created for the Prodi Commission in the wake of the Santer Commission corruption scandal.

=== Agriculture and Fisheries ===
This position used deal with the Common Agricultural Policy (CAP) and the Common Fisheries Policy (CFP). It existed when the CFP was created in the Jenkins until the Thorn Commission when it was split into Agriculture and Rural Affairs and Fisheries and Maritime Affairs.

=== Communication strategy ===
The Communication strategy portfolio in the first Barroso Commission existed between 2004 and 2010 combined with Institutional Relations. Under the second Barroso Commission this was dropped as it had no powers and was open to allegations of propaganda.

=== Consumer Protection ===
The Commissioner for Consumer Protection was responsible for protecting the rights of consumers vs corporations between 2007 and 2010. The only Commissioner was Meglena Kuneva (ALDE).

This specific portfolio was created in 2007, separated from the Health portfolio. However, it first appeared in the Jenkins Commission as "Consumer Affairs" though the Barroso Commission was the first time it has been an independent portfolio. The independent portfolio was created when Bulgaria and Romania joined the European Union on 1 January 2007. It used to be part of the Health and Consumer Protection portfolio which was held by Markos Kyprianou. Unlike the Multilingualism portfolio that was created for Leonard Orban, this post was welcomed due to the large size of the combined portfolio. The Directorate-General is still merged with that office. In 2010 it was recombined with Health in the second Barroso Commission.

=== External Relations ===
The Commissioner for External Relations, known as the Commissioner for External Relations and the European Neighbourhood Policy at its demise dealt with general foreign relations and representation of the Commission abroad. It occasionally took on related responsibilities such as enlargement or neighbourhood policy, though most of the time other separate external relations portfolios existed such as development or trade. Early on external relations were split according to geography between various Commissioners. On 1 December 2009 its responsibilities were merged into the High Representative.

=== Energy, Euratom Supply Agency, SMEs and Tourism ===
An expanded version of the Energy portfolio in the Santer Commission, including parts of Industry (SMEs) and Tourism which has only appeared under Santer.

=== Health ===
The Commissioner for Health existed between 2007 and 2010 when it was split off from Consumer Protection for the new Bulgarian Commissioner. It was recombined under the succeeding Commission in 2010.

=== Justice, Freedom and Security ===
The Justice, Freedom and Security portfolio was roughly on the former third pillar: Police and Judicial Co-operation in Criminal Matters. The position covers such matters as judicial matters, human rights, equality laws, immigration control, policing and citizenship (see Area of freedom, security and justice). The relevant DG was Directorate-General for Justice, Freedom and Security.

As a concession to the liberals, Barroso split the post in 2010 into the Commissioner for Home Affairs (the security aspect) and the Commissioner for Justice, Fundamental Rights and Citizenship (the human rights aspect).

Previous commissioners:

Name	Country	Period	Commission
Anita Gradin	Sweden	1995–1999	Santer Commission
António Vitorino	Portugal	1999–2004	Prodi Commission
Franco Frattini	Italy	2004–2008	Barroso Commission
Jacques Barrot	France	2008–2010	Barroso Commission

=== Multilingualism ===
The Commissioner for Multilingualism was responsible for language policy of the European Union, i.e., promoting multilingualism for the citizens and the institutions of the EU. It was created on 1 January 2007 during the Barroso Commission. The only commissioner is Leonard Orban (2007–2010). The post was created on 1 January 2007, in the enlarged Barroso Commission after the accession of Bulgaria and Romania to the EU. Multilingualism had been a responsibility of the European Commissioner for Education, Training, Culture and Multilingualism (held by Ján Figeľ between 2004 and 2007). Under the second Barroso Commission, the post was re-merged into the education and culture portfolio (held by Androulla Vassiliou).

The new portfolio was criticised for vagueness and ambiguity, it has been claimed that the post overlaps with responsibilities of other Commissioners. The Conference of Presidents of the European Parliament has asked the current president of the Commission José Manuel Barroso to clarify the mandate of Commissioner for Multilingualism and of other members of the commission with regards to the "intercultural dialogue".

European Parliament Socialist Group (PES) leader Martin Schulz suggested a portfolio for the protection of ethnic minorities instead. His party suggested the introduction of the protection of the Roma minority. Barroso turned down the PES proposal and defended the post. He stated that Commissioner for Education, Training and Culture Ján Figeľ "will remain responsible for the management of actions to directly promote the inter-cultural dialogue".

Politically, the portfolio was mainly focused on promoting foreign languages learning as means for worker's mobility and business competitiveness rather than emphasizing language rights of speakers of regional, minority, lesser-used and migrant languages. Commissioner for Multilingualism is also responsible, alongside the President of the Commission, Barroso, and the European Commissioner for Education, Training and Culture, Ján Figeľ to work on "intercultural dialogue", including the 2008 European Year of Intercultural Dialogue.

Administratively, Commissioner for Multilingualism was in charge of the Directorate-General for Translation, the DG for Interpretation and the Office for Official Publications of the European Communities, as well as for the Multilingualism policy unit (EAC-C-5) in the DG for Education and Culture, with 3,400 staff in total – about 15 per cent of the Brussels executive's workforce- and with about 1 percent of the EU budget.
