= Internal Services in the European Commission =

Collection of departments and services

The term Internal Service refers to a collection of Directorate-Generals and Services within the European Commission that provide services to the policy-making DGs or perform set administrative tasks. They are not policy-making themselves.

== Structure ==
- Budget
- Bureau of European Policy Advisers (BEPA)
- Informatics
- Infrastructures and Logistics
  - Brussels (OIB)
  - Luxembourg (OIL)
- Internal Audit Service (IAS)
- Interpretation
- Legal Service
- Personnel and Administration
- Translation (DGT)
