= Thorn Commission =

European Commission from 6 January 1981 to 5 January 1985

- Commission of the European Union

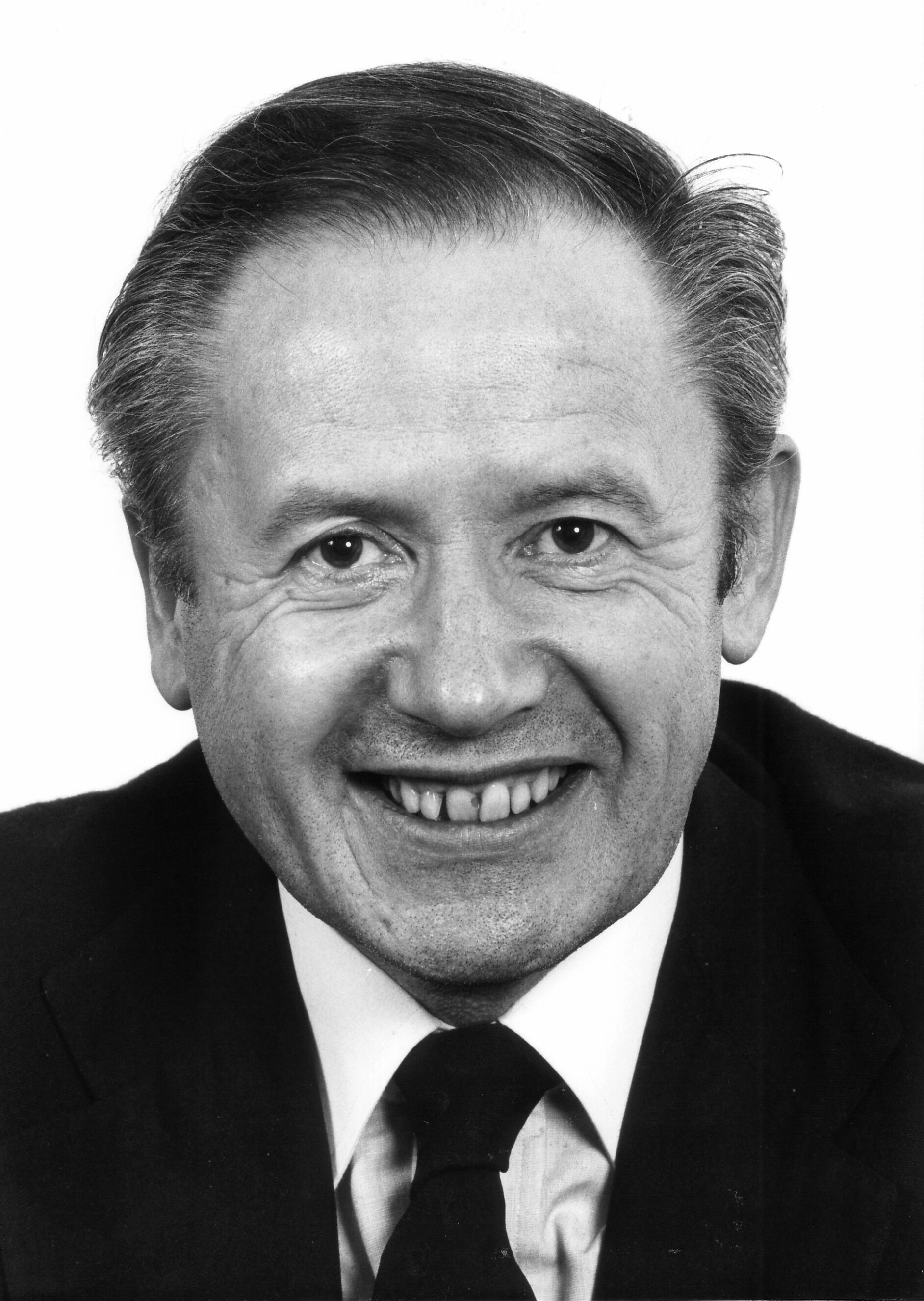
- Date formed: 6 January 1981
- Date dissolved: 5 January 1985

People and organisations
- President of the Commission: Gaston Thorn

History
- Predecessor: Jenkins Commission
- Successor: Delors Commission

The Thorn Commission was the European Commission that held office from 6 January 1981 until 5 January 1985. Its President was Gaston Thorn.

== Work ==
It was the successor to the Jenkins Commission and was succeeded by the Delors Commission. With a current economic crisis, it had to speed up enlargement to Greece, Spain and Portugal while making steps towards the Single European Act in 1985. However, with a period of eurosclerosis, due to economic problems and British vetoing over the Community budget, Thorn was unable to exert his influence to any significant extent.

== Membership ==
Portfolio	Member state	Office-holder
President (Secretariat-General, Legal Service, Spokesman’s Group, Culture and Security Office)	Luxembourg	Gaston Thorn
Vice-President; Economic and Financial Credit and Investments	France	François-Xavier Ortoli
Vice-President; External Relations (Nuclear Affairs)	Germany	Wilhelm Haferkamp
Vice-President; Mediterranean Policy, Enlargement and Information	Italy	Lorenzo Natali
Vice-President; Industrial Affairs, Energy, Research and Science (Euratom Supply Agency and the Joint Research Centre)	Belgium	Étienne Davignon
Vice-President; Budget and Financial Control, Financial Institutions and Taxation	United Kingdom	Christopher Tugendhat
Regional Policy (Coordination of Community Funds)	Italy	Antonio Giolitti
Transport, Fisheries and Tourism	Greece	Giorgos Kontogeorgis
Internal Market, Industrial Innovation, Customs Union, the Environment, Consumer Protection and Nuclear Safety	Germany	Karl-Heinz Narjes
Parliamentary Relations and Competition	Netherlands	Frans Andriessen
Employment and Social Affairs (Tripartite Conference and Education Training)	United Kingdom	Ivor Richard
Agriculture	Denmark	Finn Olav Gundelach (Died 13 January 1981)
Agriculture	Denmark	Poul Dalsager (From 20 January 1981)
Personnel and Administration (Mandate of 30 May 1980, Joint Interpreting and Conference Service, Statistical Office, Office for Official Publications)	Ireland	Michael O'Kennedy (Resigned 3 March 1982)
Personnel and Administration (Mandate of 30 May 1980, Joint Interpreting and Conference Service, Statistical Office, Office for Official Publications)	Ireland	Richard Burke (From 1 April 1982)
Development	France	Claude Cheysson (Resigned 23 April 1981)
Development	France	Edgard Pisani (From 26 May 1981; Resigned 3 December 1984)

The Thorn Commission

=== Summary by political leanings ===
The colour of the row indicates the approximate political leaning of the office holder using the following scheme:

Affiliation	No. of Commissioners
Right leaning / Conservative	7
Liberal	1
Left leaning / Socialist	4
Unknown / Independent	5
