= Stanley Clinton-Davis, Baron Clinton-Davis =

British politician (1928–2023)

The Right Honourable The Lord Clinton-Davis PC
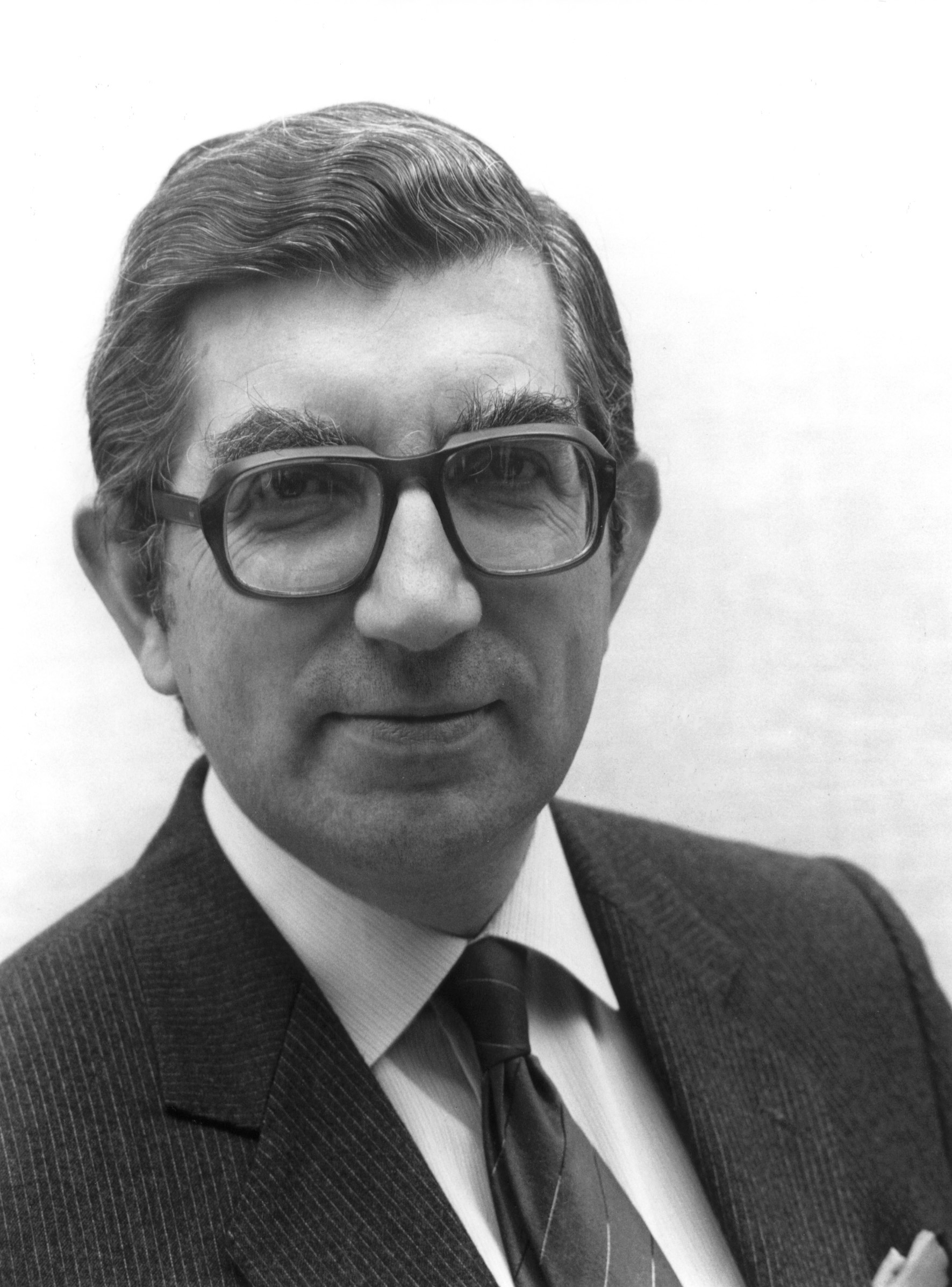
- Official portrait, 1985

Minister of State for Trade
- In office 2 May 1997 – 28 July 1998
- Prime Minister: Tony Blair
- Preceded by: Anthony Nelson
- Succeeded by: Brian Wilson

Parliamentary Under-Secretary of State for Trade
- In office 4 March 1974 – 4 May 1979
- Prime Minister: Harold Wilson; James Callaghan
- Preceded by: Eric Deakins
- Succeeded by: Michael Meacher

Member of the House of Lords
- Lord Temporal
- Life peerage 8 May 1990 – 10 January 2018

Member of Parliament for Hackney Central
- In office 18 June 1970 – 13 May 1983
- Preceded by: Herbert Butler
- Succeeded by: Constituency abolished

Personal details
- Born: Stanley Clinton Davis; 6 December 1928 London, England
- Died: 11 June 2023 (aged 94) London, England
- Party: Labour
- Spouse: Francis Lucas (m. 1954)
- Children: 4
- Education: King's College London

Stanley Clinton Clinton-Davis, Baron Clinton-Davis (born Stanley Clinton Davis, 6 December 1928 – 11 June 2023) was a British politician and solicitor. A member of the Labour Party, he served as Member of Parliament (MP) for Hackney Central from 1970 to 1983, and was a minister in the Labour governments of Harold Wilson, James Callaghan and Tony Blair. He was European Commissioner in the Delors Commission (1985–1989). In 1990, he became a life peer, sitting on the Labour benches in the House of Lords until his retirement in 2018.

== Early life ==
Davis was born in Hackney on 6 December 1928, the only child of Jewish parents Sidney and Lilly Davis. He was educated at Hackney Downs School, Mercers' School, and King's College London, where he graduated in Law in 1950. He was admitted as a solicitor in 1953.

== Early career ==
Davis became interested in Labour politics from an early age. He joined the Labour Party at the age of 15, and formed the Labour Society at King's College London. He was a member of the executive council of the National Association of Labour Student Organisations (1948–50). In 1959, Davis was elected as a councillor for the London Borough of Hackney. He served as a councillor until 1971 and was Chairman of Social Services. He was Mayor of Hackney from 1968 to 1969.

== House of Commons ==
Davis first stood as Parliamentary candidate for the Conservative-held constituency of Portsmouth Langstone at the 1955 general election. He was unsuccessful, as he subsequently was when he contested the marginal constituency of Yarmouth at the 1959 and 1964 general elections. Davis was elected to the House of Commons at the 1970 general election as MP for Hackney Central. He served as MP for the constituency until 1983, when the constituency was abolished due to boundary changes.

Davis' first ministerial post, which he held from 1974 until 1979, was as Parliamentary Under-Secretary of State for Companies, Aviation and Shipping in the governments of Prime Ministers Harold Wilson and James Callaghan. Following the Conservative Party's victory in the 1979 general election, Davis remained on the Labour front bench as the Opposition Spokesman on Trade, Prices and Consumer Protection (1979–81) and Foreign Affairs (1981–83). He was also the first MP ever to ask Margaret Thatcher a question at Prime Minister's Questions (on 22 May 1979).

== European Commission ==
In 1985, Davis was appointed to serve as European Commissioner alongside Lord Cockfield in the Delors Commission. He was the European Commissioner for Transport, the Environment and Nuclear Safety until 1989. In 1990, Clinton-Davis was awarded the Grand Cross Order of King Leopold II of Belgium for services to the European Community. Clinton-Davis was a member of the United Kingdom Delegation to the Parliamentary Assembly of the Council of Europe and Western European Union (1999–2001).

== House of Lords ==
Davis was appointed to the House of Lords as a life peer, and on 8 May 1990 was created Baron Clinton-Davis, of Hackney in the London Borough of Hackney, having changed his surname by deed poll to Clinton-Davis on 20 April. In the Lords, Clinton-Davis served as Opposition Spokesman for Transport (1990–1997), and Supporting Spokesperson for Trade and Industry (1990–1996) and Foreign Affairs (1990–1997).

Following the Labour victory at the 1997 general election, Prime Minister Tony Blair decided to use the experience of a handful of former Labour ministers at the commencement of his New Labour project. Clinton-Davis was appointed Minister of State for Trade, serving in the Department of Trade and Industry until 1998.

Clinton-Davis was appointed and sworn in as a member of the Privy Council in 1998. He retired from the House of Lords on 10 January 2018.

== Other offices and honorary positions ==
Clinton-Davis has held a number of senior positions, including chairman (1989–96) and later president (1996–97) of the British Refugee Council. Clinton-Davis was chairman (1980–84, 1989–2001) and later president (2001) of the Advisory Committee on Protection of the Sea (ACOPS). He was vice-president of the Society of Labour Lawyers (from 1991 onwards), vice-president of the Chartered Institute of Environmental Health, Honorary Member of the Executive Council of Justice and president of the Association of Municipal Authorities. Clinton-Davis was also chairman of the Packaging Standards Council (1993–97).

From 1980 to 2011, Clinton-Davis was president of the British Airline Pilots Association (BALPA) and was Honorary Life President. He was also president of the UK Pilots Association (Marine). Clinton-Davis was a member (1989–1998) and later chairman (1999–2004) of the Sasakawa Environment Prize Selection Committee. The award later came under the auspices of the United Nations Environment Programme (UNEP). Clinton-Davis was an honorary fellow of the Polytechnic University of Bucharest, a fellow of King's College London and an honorary fellow of Queen Mary University of London.

== Legal career ==
Clinton-Davis became a solicitor in November 1953 and was a founding partner of Clintons, becoming head of its Hackney branch, Clinton Davis & Co. He also worked as consultant on European Law and Affairs for S. J. Berwin & Co (1989–97, 1998–2003).

== Jewish affairs ==
Clinton-Davis spoke in Parliament on numerous occasions on issues affecting the Jewish community and Israel. He was vice-president of the All-Party Parliamentary Group Against Antisemitism and was a supporter of Labour Friends of Israel. He was an executive member of the Institute of Jewish Affairs (1993–97). He was a director of The Jewish Chronicle and a member of the Board of Deputies of British Jews.

== Personal life ==
In 1954, he married Frances Jane Lucas; they had a son and three daughters. Outside politics, his recreations were golf, football and reading biographical histories. Clinton-Davis died in Barnet, London, on 11 June 2023, at the age of 94.

== Footnotes ==
Parliament of the United Kingdom
Preceded by Herbert Butler	Member of Parliament for Hackney Central; 1970–1983	Constituency abolished
Political offices
Preceded by Karl-Heinz Narjes (environment & consumer protection); Giorgios Contogeorgis (transport)	European Commissioner for Environment, consumer protection and transport 1985–1988	Succeeded by Carlo Ripa di Meana (environment); Grigoris Varfis (consumer protection); Karel Van Miert (transport)
