= Carlo Ripa di Meana =

Italian politician

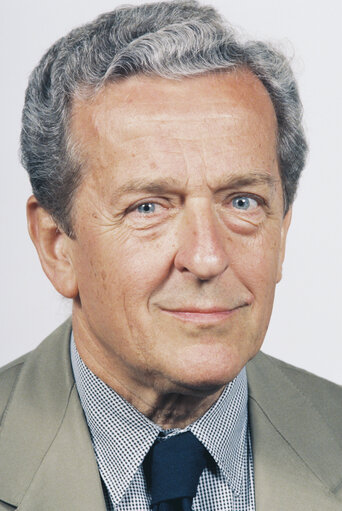

Minister of the Environment
- In office 28 June 1992 – 9 March 1993
- Prime Minister: Giuliano Amato
- Preceded by: Giorgio Ruffolo
- Succeeded by: Valdo Spini

European Commissioner for the Environment
- In office 6 January 1989 – 31 December 1992
- President: Jacques Delors
- Preceded by: Stanley Clinton Davis
- Succeeded by: Ioannis Paleokrassas

European Commissioner for the Institutional Reforms, Information Policy, Culture and Tourism
- In office 5 January 1985 – 6 January 1989
- President: Jacques Delors
- Preceded by: Lorenzo Natali (Information); Giorgios Contogeorgis (Tourism)
- Succeeded by: Jean Dondelinger

Member of the European Parliament
- In office 19 July 1994 – 19 July 1999
- Constituency: Central Italy
- In office 17 July 1979 – 23 July 1984
- Constituency: North-East Italy

Personal details
- Born: 15 August 1929 Pietrasanta, Kingdom of Italy
- Died: 2 March 2018 (aged 88) Rome, Italy
- Party: PCI (1948–1958); PSI (1958–1993); Greens (1993–2001)
- Spouse: Marina Ripa di Meana (m. 1982; died 2018)

Carlo Ripa di Meana (15 August 1929 – 2 March 2018) was an Italian politician. He was a Member of the European Parliament, a European Commissioner with portfolio for the environment and was environment minister of Italy. He was the leader of the Italian Greens and president of the organization Italia Nostra.

== Early life ==
Ripa di Meana was born on 15 August 1929 in Pietrasanta, Tuscany. His father was Marquis Giulio Ripa di Meana, high official of the grenadiers, while his mother was Fulvia Schanzer, daughter of the senator and minister Carlo Schanzer. He brought noble titles of noblemen of the Marquis of Giaglione, Marquis of Meana, lord of Alteretto and Losa, noble of the lords of the Marquisate of Ceva.

== Career ==
In the period between 1953 and 1956, he directed in Prague, on behalf of the Italian Communist Party (PCI), the International Student Union's newspaper, World Student News. In Prague he also met Bettino Craxi. In 1957 he was made bookseller for Feltrinelli.

In the 60s Ripa di Meana joined the Italian Socialist Party and he came in its Central Committee.

In 1970 regional election he was elected in the Regional Council of Lombardy. In 1971 he was among the hundreds of signatories of the open letter published in the weekly L'Espresso on the case of Giuseppe Pinelli, a railroad worker and anarchist who died while being detained by Italian police in 1969, in which police chief Luigi Calabresi was pointed out as responsible for his death. In 2007, in a public assembly, he asked "pardon of Mrs. Calabresi and her children", as a consequence of the subsequent murder of Calabresi in 1972.

In the 1979 European Parliament election he was elected MEP.

From 1973 to 1978 Ripa di Meana was also president of the Venice Biennale.

From 1985 to 1992 he served as European Commissioner for the Environment and for the Culture in the first and second Delors Commission, while in 1992 and 1993 he was Minister of the Environment in the Amato I Cabinet.

From 1993 to 1996 Ripa di Meana was the Spokesperson of the Federation of the Greens, in the 1994 European Parliament election he was again elected MEP, while in 2000 regional election he was elected in the Umbrian Regional Council.

Since 2001 he had been President of the National Landscape Committee.

== Personal life ==
Ripa di Meana was romantically linked to Gae Aulenti. In 1982 he married Marina Punturieri, the former wife of Alessandro Lante della Rovere and mother of the actress Lucrezia Lante della Rovere, in a civil ceremony at Campagnano di Roma. Witnesses were Antonio Giolitti, Bettino Craxi, Alberto Moravia and Goffredo Parise. In 2002 they followed with a religious ceremony at Monte Castello di Vibio, in Umbria. In 2010 the couple adopted a son, Andrea Cardella Ripa di Meana.

== Death ==
Ripa di Meana died in Rome on the afternoon of 2 March 2018, two months after his wife Marina died after a long illness on 5 January 2018.
