= Jenkins Commission (EU) =

The Jenkins Commission was the European Commission that held office from 6 January 1977 to 6 January 1981. Its President was Roy Jenkins.

== Work ==
It was the successor to the Ortoli Commission and was succeeded by the Thorn Commission. Despite stagnating growth and a higher energy bill, the Jenkins Commission oversaw the development of the Economic and Monetary Union of the European Union from 1977, which began in 1979 as the European Monetary System, a forerunner of the Single Currency or euro. President Jenkins was the first President to attend a G8 summit on behalf of the Community.

== Membership ==
The Jenkins Commission

Portfolio(s)	Commissioner	Member state	Party affiliation
President	Roy Jenkins	United Kingdom	Labour
Taxation, Consumer Affairs, Transport	Richard Burke	Ireland	Fine Gael
Vice-President; External Relations	Wilhelm Haferkamp	West Germany	SPD
Energy, Research, Science	Guido Brunner	West Germany	FDP
Competition	Raymond Vouel	Luxembourg	Socialist Workers' Party
Internal Market, Customs Union, Industrial Affairs	Étienne Davignon	Belgium	none
Vice-President; Employment and Social Affairs	Henk Vredeling	Netherlands	PvdA
Vice-President; Agriculture-Fisheries	Finn Olav Gundelach	Denmark	
Vice-President; Economic and Finance, Credit and Investments	François-Xavier Ortoli	France	Gaullist
Development	Claude Cheysson	France	Socialist Party
Regional Policy	Antonio Giolitti	Italy	PSI
Vice-President; Enlargement, Environment, Nuclear Safety	Lorenzo Natali	Italy	Christian Democrat
Budget and Financial Control, Financial Institutions	Christopher Tugendhat	United Kingdom	Conservative Party

=== Summary by political leanings ===
The colour of the row indicates the approximate political leaning of the office holder using the following scheme:

Affiliation	No. of Commissioners
Right leaning / Conservative	4
Liberal	1
Left leaning / Socialist	6
None / Independent	2
