= António Cardoso e Cunha =

Portuguese politician (1933–2021)

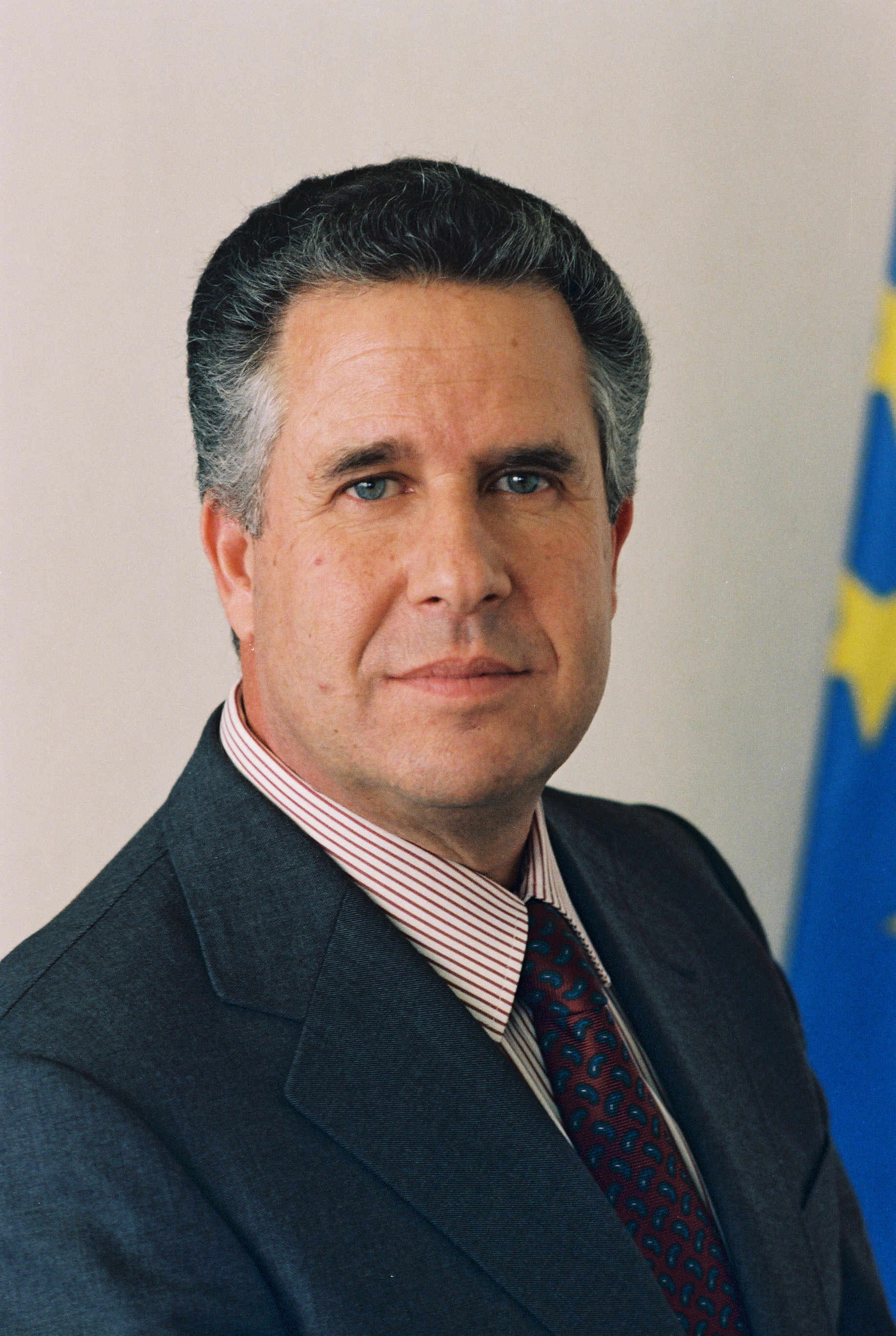
- Official portrait, 1988

Commissioner for Energy, Euratom, Small Businesses, Staff and Translation
- In office 1989–1993
- President: Jacques Delors
- Preceded by: Nicolas Mosar
- Succeeded by: Marcelino Oreja

European Commissioner for Fisheries
- In office 5 January 1986 – 1989
- President: Jacques Delors
- Preceded by: Position established
- Succeeded by: Carlo Ripa di Meana

Minister for Agriculture and Fisheries
- In office 1980–1981
- Prime Minister: Francisco Sá Carneiro; Francisco Pinto Balsemão
- Preceded by: Joaquim Lourenço
- Succeeded by: Basílio Horta

Personal details
- Born: 28 January 1933 Leiria, Portugal
- Died: 24 January 2021 (aged 87)
- Party: Social Democratic Party
- Education: University of Lisbon

António José Baptista Cardoso e Cunha (28 January 1933 – 24 January 2021) was a Portuguese Social Democratic Party (PSD) politician. He was a government minister in the 1970s and 1980s, and then from 1986 to 1992 he served as Portugal's first European Commissioner.

== Career ==
Born in Leiria, Cardoso e Cunha studied at the University of Lisbon and then worked as chemical engineer and in business administration.

He was elected to the Assembly of the Republic in 1978, and in September 1978 he was appointed as State Secretary for Foreign Trade, a junior ministerial post in the Democratic Alliance government led by Alfredo Nobre da Costa. In November 1978, the new Prime Minister Carlos Mota Pinto appointed Cardoso e Cunha as State Secretary for Industrial Renewal. From 1980 to 1981, Cardoso e Cunha served in the cabinets of Francisco Sá Carneiro and Francisco Pinto Balsemão as Minister for Agriculture and fisheries.

When Portugal joined the European Economic Community in 1986, Cardoso e Cunha was nominated by the government of Aníbal Cavaco Silva to be Portugal's first member of the European Commission. He joined the first Delors Commission as Commissioner for Fisheries, and in 1989 was appointed to the second Delors Commission as Commissioner for Energy, Euratom, small businesses, staff and translation. He served until the Commission's term ended in 1993.

He was then appointed as the first commissioner of Expo '98. He was replaced in 1997 after a change of government, and became president of the state-owned airline TAP Air Portugal until 2004.

In 2006, Cardoso e Cunha was declared bankrupt by the Lisbon Court of Commerce.
