= Karel Van Miert =

Belgian socialist politician

- Official portrait, 1988

European Commissioner for Competition
- In office 6 January 1993 – 13 September 1999
- President: Jacques Delors; Jacques Santer; Manuel Marín (Acting)
- Preceded by: Leon Brittan
- Succeeded by: Mario Monti

European Commissioner for Transport and Consumer Protection
- In office 6 January 1989 – 6 January 1993
- President: Jacques Delors
- Preceded by: Stanley Clinton-Davis (Environment and Transport); Grigoris Varfis (Regional Policy and Consumer Protection)
- Succeeded by: Abel Matutes (Transport and Energy); Christiane Scrivener (Taxation, the Customs Union and Consumer Policies)

Personal details
- Born: 17 January 1942 Oud-Turnhout, Belgium
- Died: 22 June 2009 (aged 67) Beersel, Belgium
- Party: Different Socialist Party
- Education: Ghent University

Karel Antonius Lucia Maria Van Miert (Dutch: [ˈkaːrəl vɑ ˈmiːrt]; 17 January 1942 – 22 June 2009) was a Belgian politician of the Different Socialist Party and official of the European Commission.

== Biography ==
He was born in Oud-Turnhout. He studied at Ghent University (1962–1966) and gained a degree in diplomatic sciences. In 1976 he became adjunct-national secretary of the – at that time – unitary Belgian socialist party. Two years later he became president of the Different Socialist Party. In 1989 he was appointed European commissioner responsible for transport, credit and investment and consumer policy. In 1992 he was also put in charge of environmental policy. On 26 May 1992 he was appointed Minister of State. From 1993 till 1999 he served as vice-chairman of the European commission and was responsible for competition policy. In this period Van Miert was according to The Guardian "one of the most powerful men in Europe." In 2001, he was awarded the Vlerick Award. He also worked with Eli Lilly and Company, a global pharmaceutical corporation. After his departure from politics Van Miert was an international advisor to Goldman Sachs.

On 22 June 2009, 67-year-old Van Miert died at his home in Beersel, after falling from a garden ladder when he had a cardiac arrest.

== Political curriculum ==
- Member of the European Parliament (1979–1985)
- Deputy in the Belgian Chamber (1985–1988)
- European Commissioner (1989–1999)

== Notes ==
Political offices
Preceded by Willy De Clercq	Belgian European Commissioner; 1989–1999	Succeeded by Philippe Busquin
Preceded by Stanley Clinton-Davis as European Commissioner for Environment and Transport	European Commissioner for Transport and Consumer Protection; 1989–1993	Succeeded by Grigoris Varfis as European Commissioner for Regional Policy and Consumer Protection
Preceded by Abel Matutes as European Commissioner for Transport and Energy	European Commissioner for Transport and Consumer Protection; 1989–1993	Succeeded by Christiane Scrivener as European Commissioner for Taxation, the Customs Union and Consumer Policies
Preceded by Leon Brittan	European Commissioner for Competition; 1993–1999	Succeeded by Mario Monti
