= Grigoris Varfis =

Greek politician

- Γρηγόρης Βάρφης
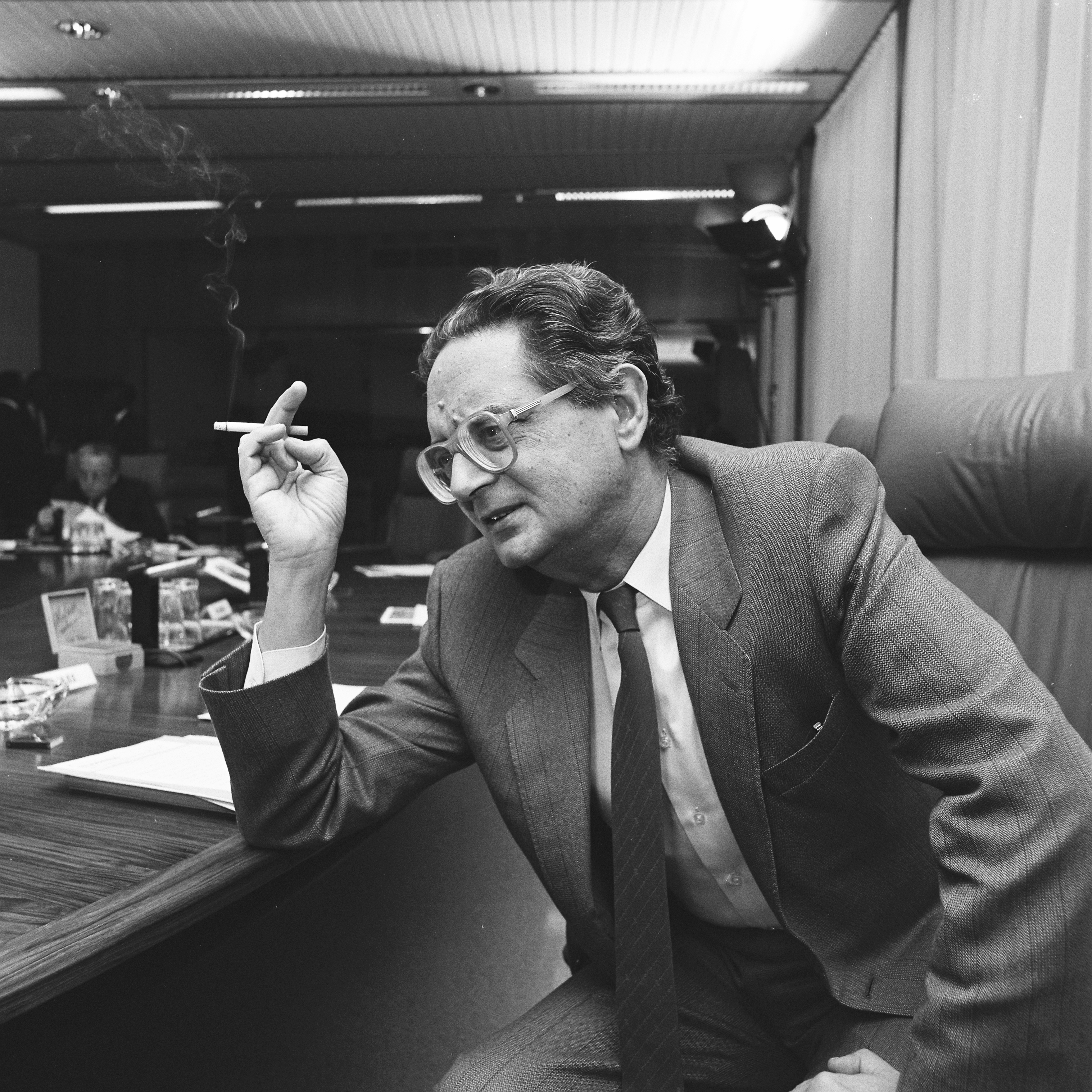
- Varfis in 1986

European Commissioner for Relations with the European Parliament, Regional Policy and Consumer Protection
- In office 1985–1989
- President: Jacques Delors
- Preceded by: Henning Christophersen
- Succeeded by: António Cardoso e Cunha

Member of the European Parliament
- In office 24 July 1984 – 5 January 1985
- Constituency: Greece

Personal details
- Born: 2 January 1927 (age 99)
- Died: 24 July 2017 (aged 90)
- Party: PASOK
- Other political affiliations: Confederation of the Socialist Parties

Grigoris Varfis (Greek: Γρηγόρης Βάρφης; 2 January 1927 – 10 September 2017) was a Greek politician.

For the second half of 1983 Varfis was President of the Council of the European Union.

Later, he was a Member of the European Parliament (MEP) from 24 July 1984 to 5 January 1985, where he represented the interests of the PASOK party. Finally, he was until 1989 EU Commissioner for relations with the EU Parliament for Regional Policies (1985) and for Consumer Protection (1986 to 1989) in the first Commission of Jacques Delors. He died on 10 September 2017 at the age of 90.

Political offices
Preceded by Giorgios Contogeorgis	Greek European Commissioner; 1985–1989	Succeeded by Vasso Papandreou
