= Lorenzo Natali =

Italian politician (1922–1989)

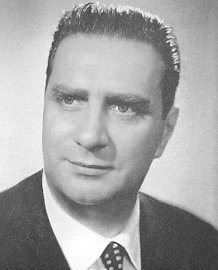

European Commissioner for International Cooperation and Development and European for Enlargement
- In office 1985–1989
- President: Jacques Delors
- Preceded by: Edgard Pisani (Development); Himself (Enlargement)
- Succeeded by: Manuel Marín

European Commissioner for Mediterranean Policies, Enlargement and Information
- In office 1981–1985
- President: Gaston Thorn
- Preceded by: Himself (Enlargement)
- Succeeded by: Himself (Enlargement); Claude Cheysson (Mediterranean Policies)

European Commissioner for Energy, for the Environment and for Enlargement
- In office 25 June 1968 – 13 December 1968
- President: Roy Jenkins
- Preceded by: Henri François Simonet (Energy); Carlo Scarascia-Mugnozza (Environment)
- Succeeded by: Himself (Environment); Étienne Davignon (Energy); Karl-Heinz Narjes (Environment)

Minister of Merchant Navy
- In office 1966–1968
- Prime Minister: Aldo Moro
- Preceded by: Giovanni Spagnolli
- Succeeded by: Giovanni Spagnolli

Minister of Public Works
- In office 1968–1968
- Prime Minister: Giovanni Leone
- Preceded by: Giacomo Mancini
- Succeeded by: Giacomo Mancini
- In office 1969–1970
- Prime Minister: Mariano Rumor
- Preceded by: Giacomo Mancini
- Succeeded by: Salvatore Lauricella

Minister of Tourism and Entertainment
- In office 1968–1969
- Prime Minister: Mariano Rumor
- Preceded by: Domenico Magrì
- Succeeded by: Giovanni Battista Scaglia

Minister of Agriculture
- In office 1970–1973
- Prime Minister: Mariano Rumor; Emilio Colombo; Giulio Andreotti
- Preceded by: Giacomo Sedati
- Succeeded by: Mario Ferrari Aggradi

Member of the Chamber of Deputies
- In office 1948–1977
- Constituency: L'Aquila

Personal details
- Born: 2 October 1922 Florence, Italy
- Died: 29 August 1989 (aged 66) Rome, Italy
- Party: Christian Democracy
- Education: University of Florence

Lorenzo Natali Pierucci Bondicchi (1922–1989) was an Italian politician for Christian Democracy, and a European Commissioner from 1977 to 1989.

== Early life and career ==
Natali's parents were born in Colle di Buggiano, in the province of Pistoia. His mother was a countess, while his father was the son of a farmer, but he graduated in medicine. In 1925 his father won a primary position at the hospital in L'Aquila and the whole family moved to Abruzzo. Natali grew up and lived in L'Aquila. In 1929, Natali's mother died in childbirth.

Natali was greatly influenced by his father, a convinced anti-fascist. He obtained his classical high school diploma at the Domenico Cotugno high school in L'Aquila, then moved to Colle di Buggiano to study law in Florence. After graduation, he became a lawyer.

During the Second World War Natali was responsible for the Catholic youth groups in L'Aquila. He joined the Italian Liberation Corps as a volunteer and participated in the fight against the Nazi-fascists from 16 June to 17 July 1944 in the ranks of the 4th XXXIII Bersaglieri regiment. On 17 July, he was wounded in battle on the Musone nelle Marche river, and on 27 April 1945, he received the Cross for Military Valor.

== Political career ==
In 1955 Natali was appointed Undersecretary to the Presidency of the Council of Ministers for the press and information within the Segni I government. In this capacity, he participated in the signing of the Treaty of Rome on 25 March 1957. Subsequently, he held the positions of undersecretary of the ministry of finance (Zoli government and Fanfani II government) and of the treasury ministry (Tambroni government, Fanfani III government, Fanfani IV government, Leone I government and Moro I government).

In 1966 he was appointed minister for the first time and joined the Moro III government as Minister of Merchant Marine. Later he was Minister of Public Works in the Leone II and Rumor II Governments, Minister of Tourism and Entertainment in the Rumor I Government and Minister of Agriculture in the Rumor III, Colombo, Andreotti I and II Governments.

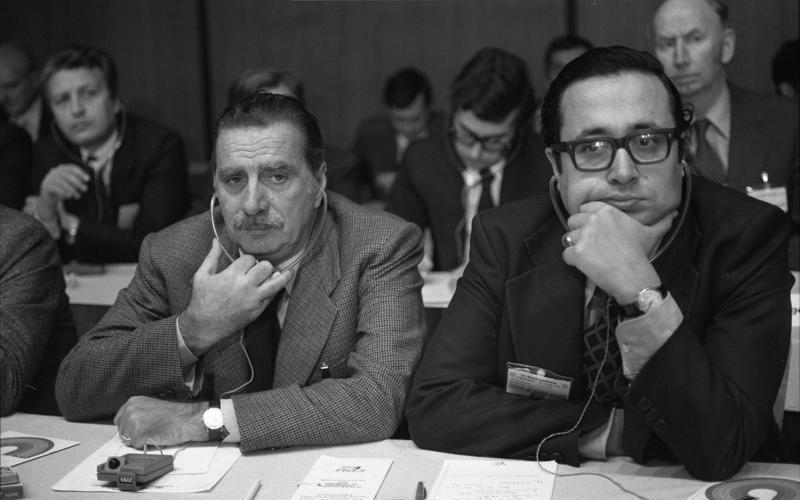
Lorenzo Natali, left, 1978

He served as Vice-President of the European Commission and Commissioner for Enlargement, Environment and Nuclear Safety in the Jenkins Commission from 1977 to 1981. He then served as Vice-President and Commissioner for Mediterranean Policy, Enlargement and Information in the Thorn Commission from 1981 to 1985. He was Vice-President and held the portfolio of Cooperation, Development Affairs and Enlargement in the Delors Commission from 1985 to 1989. He was a government minister in Italy from 1966 to 1972 and served as Minister of Agriculture from 1970.

The Lorenzo Natali Media Prize, a journalism prize awarded annually by the European Commission's Directorate-General for International Partnerships, is named in his honour.
