= Jean Dondelinger =

Luxembourgish diplomat and civil servant

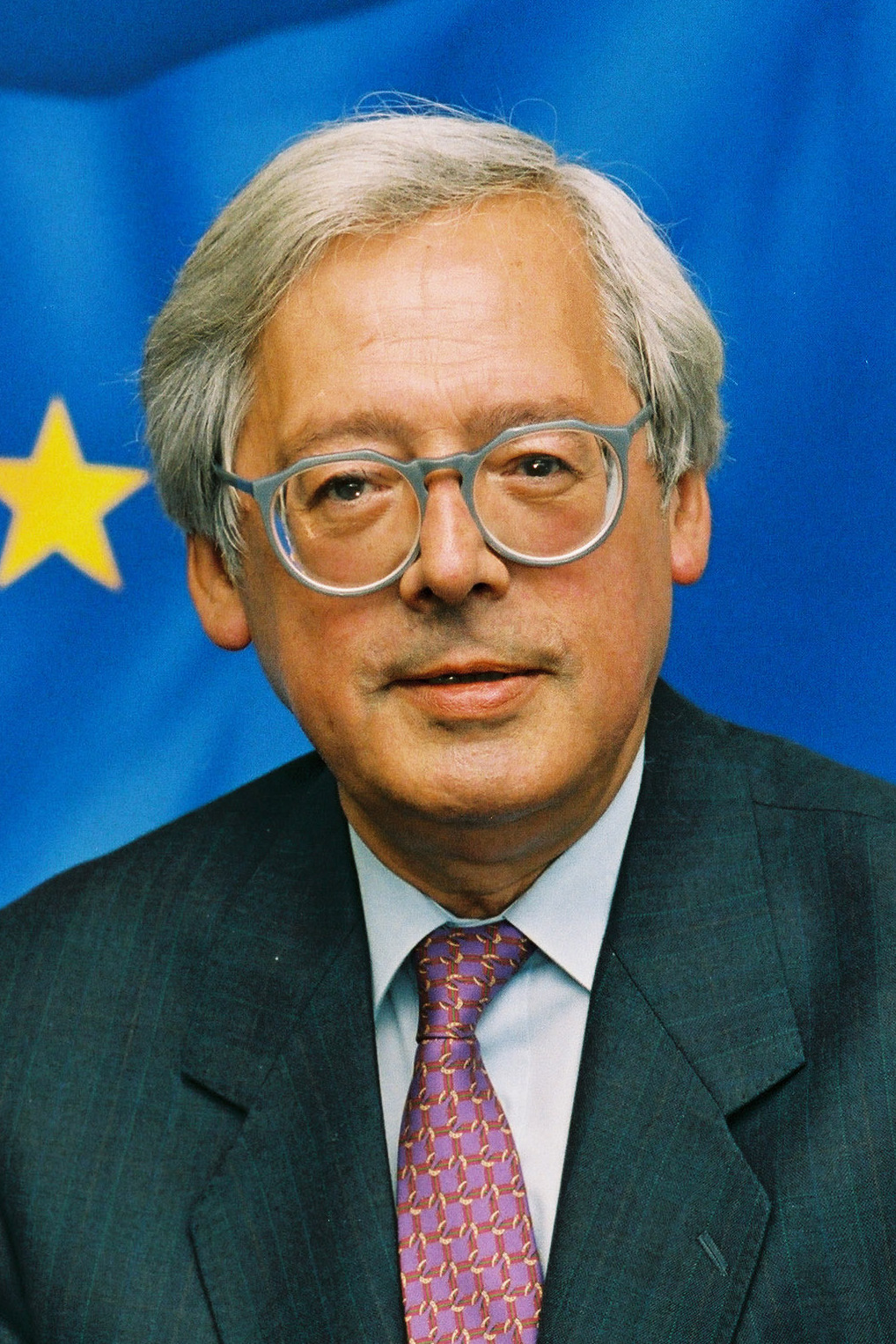
- Official portrait, 1989

European Commissioner for Audiovisual and Cultural Affairs
- In office 6 January 1989 – 4 January 1993
- President: Jacques Delors
- Preceded by: Carlo Ripa di Meana
- Succeeded by: Marcelino Oreja

Personal details
- Born: 4 July 1931
- Died: 21 October 2004 (aged 73)

Jean Dondelinger (4 July 1931 – 21 October 2004) was a Luxembourgish diplomat and civil servant. He served as Luxembourg's European Commissioner, as well as holding positions in the domestic civil service and the diplomatic service.

Political offices
| Preceded by Carlo Ripa di Meana | European Commissioner for Audiovisual and Cultural Affairs; 1989–1992 | Succeeded by Marcelino Oreja |
| Preceded by Nicolas Mosar | Luxembourgian European Commissioner; 1989–1992 | Succeeded by René Steichen |
