= Richard Burke (Irish politician) =

Irish politician (1932–2016)

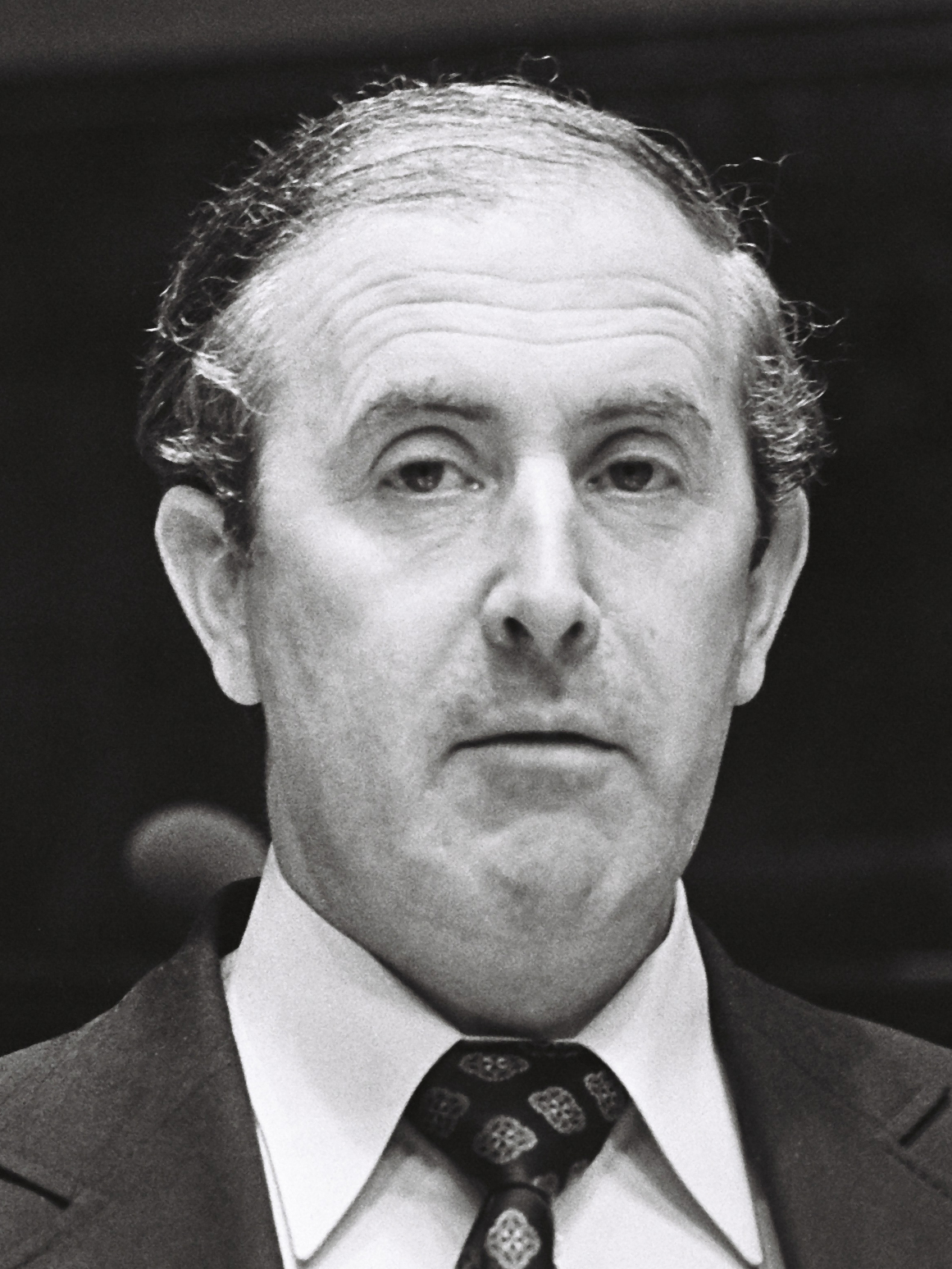
- Burke in 1977

European Commissioner for Interinstitutional Relations and Administration
- In office 1 April 1982 – 5 January 1985
- President: Gaston Thorn
- Preceded by: Michael O'Kennedy
- Succeeded by: Henning Christophersen

European Commissioner for Taxation, Consumer Affairs, Transport and Parliamentary Relations
- In office 6 January 1977 – 6 January 1981
- President: Roy Jenkins
- Preceded by: New office
- Succeeded by: Office abolished

Minister for Education
- In office 14 March 1973 – 2 December 1976
- Taoiseach: Liam Cosgrave
- Preceded by: Pádraig Faulkner
- Succeeded by: Peter Barry

Teachta Dála
- In office June 1981 – 30 March 1982
- Constituency: Dublin West
- In office June 1969 – June 1977
- Constituency: Dublin County South

Personal details
- Born: 29 March 1932 New York City, U.S.
- Died: 15 March 2016 (aged 83) Dublin, Ireland
- Party: Fine Gael
- Spouse: Mary (m. 1968)
- Children: 6
- Education: University College Dublin; King's Inns

Richard Burke (29 March 1932 – 15 March 2016) was an Irish Fine Gael politician who served as European Commissioner for Interinstitutional Relations and Administration from 1982 to 1985, European Commissioner for Taxation, Consumer Affairs, Transport and Parliamentary Relations from 1977 to 1981 and Minister for Education from 1973 to 1976. He served as a Teachta Dála (TD) from 1969 to 1976 and from 1981 to 1982.

== Early life and education ==
Burke was born in Brooklyn, New York City, in 1932. He was raised in Upperchurch, County Tipperary, and educated at the Christian Brothers School, Thurles. He went on to study at University College Dublin (UCD) and King's Inns. He worked as a teacher before embarking on a political career.

== Political career ==
His first political involvement was with the Christian Democrat Party founded by Seán Loftus. However, he soon became a member of Fine Gael, becoming a member of Dublin County Council in 1967. Two years later, in 1969, he was elected to Dáil Éireann for the first time, becoming a TD for Dublin County South. He was immediately appointed Fine Gael Chief Whip by party leader Liam Cosgrave.

In 1973, a new Fine Gael–Labour Party coalition government was formed, and Burke was appointed Minister for Education. He joined the Taoiseach, Liam Cosgrave, in voting against the government's own Control of Importation, Sale and Manufacture of Contraceptives Bill 1974. In December 1976, he was nominated as Ireland's European Commissioner, chosen ahead of fellow minister Justin Keating of Labour to succeed Patrick Hillery, who returned to become President of Ireland. Burke resigned his seat in the Dáil in January 1977 to take up his position.

He took office in the Jenkins Commission as commissioner for taxation, consumer affairs, transport. On the completion of his four-year term as a European commissioner, he accepted an invitation to stand at the 1981 general election for Fine Gael in June, on returning to Ireland from Harvard University after his fellowship year at Leverett House from 1980 to 1981. He was elected a TD for Dublin West.

However, Burke was not appointed to the short-lived cabinet of Garret FitzGerald. At the February 1982 election, he retained his seat, but Fine Gael lost office. Charles Haughey formed a minority Fianna Fáil government with the support of independent deputies. Haughey's government nominated Burke for acceptance by the European Council and European Parliament as a European commissioner, avoiding a depletion of the government's numbers. Being appointed for the second time his seniority resulted in his nomination as a vice-president of the Commission.

== Later life and death ==
Burke was president of the Canon Foundation in Europe, a stichting (Dutch nonprofit) established by Canon Inc. for Japan–Europe scientific and cultural exchange, from its December 1987 creation until 1998.

Burke married Mary in 1968, and they had six children. Burke died on 15 March 2016 in Dublin. He was predeceased by his son Joseph.

Political offices
Preceded by Pádraig Faulkner	Minister for Education; 1973–1976	Succeeded by Peter Barry
Preceded by Patrick Hillery	Irish European Commissioner; 1977–1980	Succeeded by Michael O'Kennedy
Preceded by Michael O'Kennedy	Irish European Commissioner; 1982–1984	Succeeded by Peter Sutherland

Dáil	Election	Deputy (Party)	Deputy (Party)	Deputy (Party)
19th	1969	Kevin Boland (FF)	Tom O'Higgins (FG)	Richard Burke (FG)
19th	1970 by-election	Larry McMahon (FG)	Tom O'Higgins (FG)	Richard Burke (FG)
20th	1973	Larry McMahon (FG)	Ruairí Brugha (FF)	Richard Burke (FG)
21st	1977	John Kelly (FG)	Niall Andrews (FF)	John Horgan (Lab)
22nd	1981	Constituency abolished. See Dublin South		

Dáil	Election	Deputy (Party)	Deputy (Party)	Deputy (Party)	Deputy (Party)	Deputy (Party)
22nd	1981	Jim Mitchell (FG)	Brian Lenihan Snr (FF)	Richard Burke (FG)	Eileen Lemass (FF)	Brian Fleming (FG)
23rd	1982 (Feb)	Jim Mitchell (FG)	Brian Lenihan Snr (FF)	Richard Burke (FG)	Liam Lawlor (FF)	Brian Fleming (FG)
23rd	1982 by-election	Jim Mitchell (FG)	Brian Lenihan Snr (FF)	Liam Skelly (FG)	Liam Lawlor (FF)	Brian Fleming (FG)
24th	1982 (Nov)	Jim Mitchell (FG)	Brian Lenihan Snr (FF)	Liam Skelly (FG)	Eileen Lemass (FF)	Tomás Mac Giolla (WP)
25th	1987	Jim Mitchell (FG)	Brian Lenihan Snr (FF)	Pat O'Malley (PDs)	Liam Lawlor (FF)	Tomás Mac Giolla (WP)
26th	1989	Jim Mitchell (FG)	Brian Lenihan Snr (FF)	Austin Currie (FG)	Liam Lawlor (FF)	Tomás Mac Giolla (WP)
27th	1992	Joan Burton (Lab)	Brian Lenihan Snr (FF)	Austin Currie (FG)	Liam Lawlor (FF)	4 seats 1992–2002
27th	1996 by-election	Joan Burton (Lab)	Brian Lenihan Jnr (FF)	Austin Currie (FG)	Liam Lawlor (FF)	4 seats 1992–2002
28th	1997	Joe Higgins (SP)	Brian Lenihan Jnr (FF)	Austin Currie (FG)	Liam Lawlor (FF)	4 seats 1992–2002
29th	2002	Joe Higgins (SP)	Brian Lenihan Jnr (FF)	Joan Burton (Lab)	3 seats 2002–2011	
30th	2007	Leo Varadkar (FG)	Brian Lenihan Jnr (FF)	Joan Burton (Lab)	3 seats 2002–2011	
31st	2011	Leo Varadkar (FG)	Brian Lenihan Jnr (FF)	Joan Burton (Lab)	Joe Higgins (SP)	4 seats 2011–2024
31st	2011 by-election	Leo Varadkar (FG)	Patrick Nulty (Lab)	Joan Burton (Lab)	Joe Higgins (SP)	4 seats 2011–2024
31st	2014 by-election	Leo Varadkar (FG)	Ruth Coppinger (SP)	Joan Burton (Lab)	Joe Higgins (SP)	4 seats 2011–2024
32nd	2016	Leo Varadkar (FG)	Ruth Coppinger (AAA–PBP)	Joan Burton (Lab)	Jack Chambers (FF)	4 seats 2011–2024
33rd	2020	Leo Varadkar (FG)	Paul Donnelly (SF)	Roderic O'Gorman (GP)	Jack Chambers (FF)	4 seats 2011–2024
34th	2024	Emer Currie (FG)	Paul Donnelly (SF)	Roderic O'Gorman (GP)	Jack Chambers (FF)	Ruth Coppinger (PBP–S)
