= Offices for Infrastructure and Logistics (European Commission) =

European Union office

The Office for Infrastructure and Logistics in Brussels (OIB) and the Office for Infrastructure and Logistics in Luxembourg (OIL) are two services of the European Commission, created by a Commission decision dating to 6 November 2002.

== Office for Infrastructure and logistics – Brussels (OIB) ==
The mission of OIB is to ensure the implementation of all actions connected with the accommodation of personnel, the management of social infrastructure and the logistics of the institution.

== Office for Infrastructure and Logistics - Luxembourg (OIL) ==
OIL is responsible for the following services for all Commission departments in Luxembourg:

- The housing of staff
- The provision and management of social welfare infrastructure
- Logistics
- Compliance with health and safety requirements in the buildings
