= Directorate-General for Digital Services =

The Directorate-General for Digital Services (DG DIGIT) is a Directorate-General of the European Commission. It was called Directorate-General for Informatics until November 2023.

The mission of the DG DIGIT is to define the IT strategy of the commission and to provide a modern and high-performance information technology and telecommunications infrastructure.

The current director-general is Veronica Gaffey.

== See also ==
- European Commissioner for Budget and Administration
- Trans European Services for Telematics between Administrations (TESTA)
- European Network and Information Security Agency
- EUDRANET
