= Giorgos Kontogeorgis =

Greek politician and economist (1912–2009)

- Γιώργος Κοντογεώργης
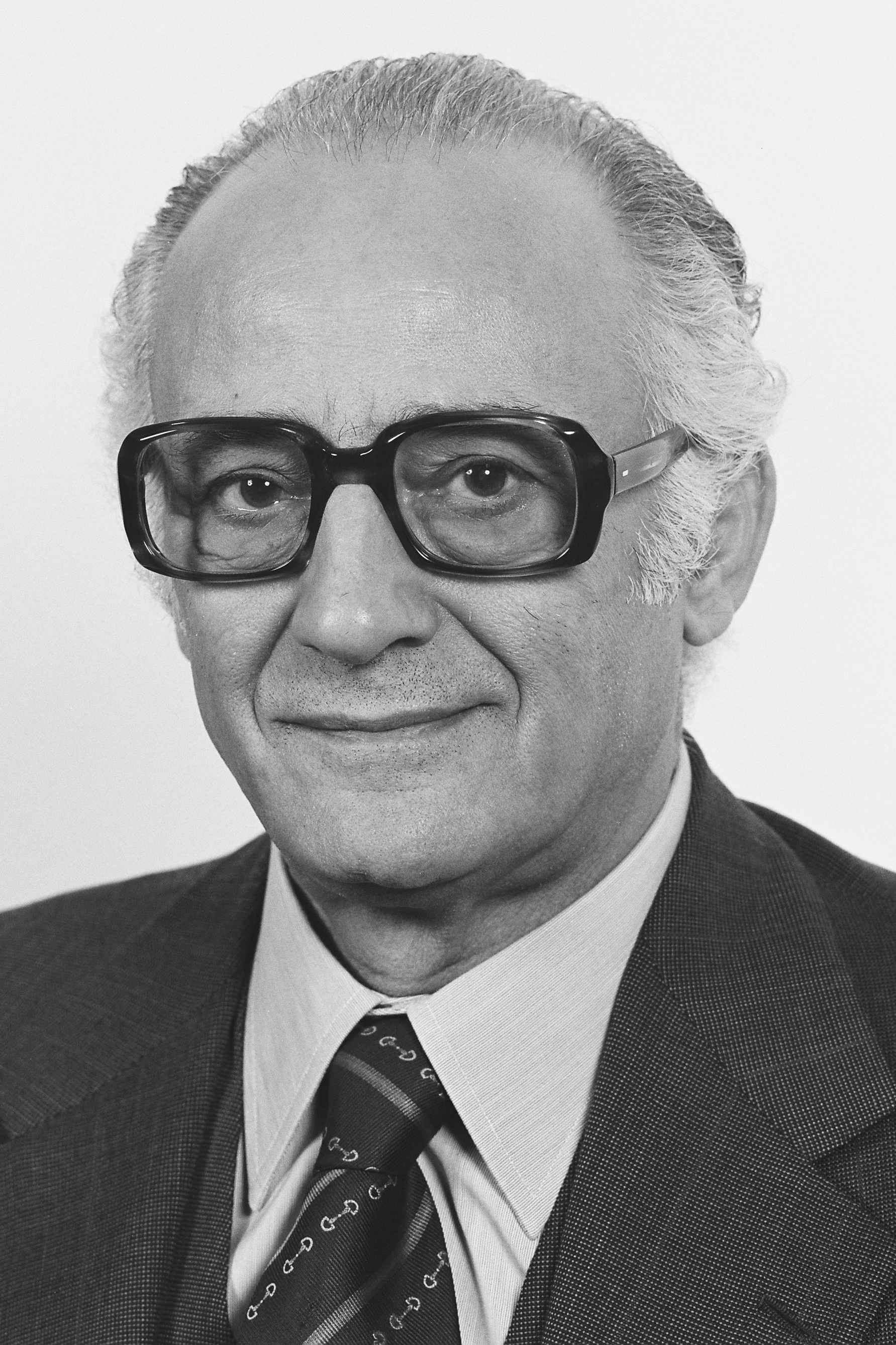
- Official portrait, 1980

Minister of National Economy and Tourism
- In office 13 February 1990 – 11 April 1990
- Prime Minister: Xenophon Zolotas
- Preceded by: Georgios Souflias
- Succeeded by: Georgios Gennimatas
- In office 12 October 1989 – 23 November 1989
- Prime Minister: Ioannis Grivas
- Preceded by: Georgios Souflias
- Succeeded by: Georgios Gennimatas

European Commissioner for Transport, Fisheries and Tourism
- In office January 1981 – 1985
- President: Gaston Thorn
- Preceded by: Richard Burke
- Succeeded by: Stanley Clinton-Davis

Personal details
- Born: 21 November 1912 Tinos, Kingdom of Greece
- Died: 9 November 2009 (aged 96)
- Party: New Democracy
- Education: Supreme School of Economics and Business

Giorgos Kontogeorgis (Greek: Γιώργος Κοντογεώργης; 21 November 1912 – 9 November 2009) was a Greek economist who became a civil servant and politician. He played a crucial role in planning Greece's accession to the European Economic Community (EEC) in 1981, and he became Greece's first European Commissioner.

Born in Tinos, Kontogeorgis studied economics at the Supreme School of Economics and Business in Athens, and took a master's degree in the United States. He joined the Greek civil service, rising to become General Director of the Ministry of Commerce, but resigned from that post when the Greek junta took power after a coup in 1967. When civilian rule was restored in 1974, the Prime Minister Konstantinos Karamanlis appointed Kontogeorgis as Deputy Minister of Coordination and Planning.

At the 1977 elections, Kontogeorgis was elected to the Hellenic Parliament as a candidate of Karamanlis's New Democracy party. In 1979, he was one of the signatories of the treaty by which Greece acceded to the EEC, and in May 1980 the new prime minister George Rallis appointed Kontogeorgis to his cabinet as a minister without portfolio, with responsibility for relations with the EEC.

In January 1981, Kontogeorgis took office as the European Commissioner for Transport, Fisheries and Tourism in the Thorn Commission. He held that post until the next Commission took office in early 1985. He later served for two brief periods as Greece's Minister of National Economy and Tourism, in late 1989 and early 1990.
