= Karl-Heinz Narjes =

German politician

Karl-Hein Narjes
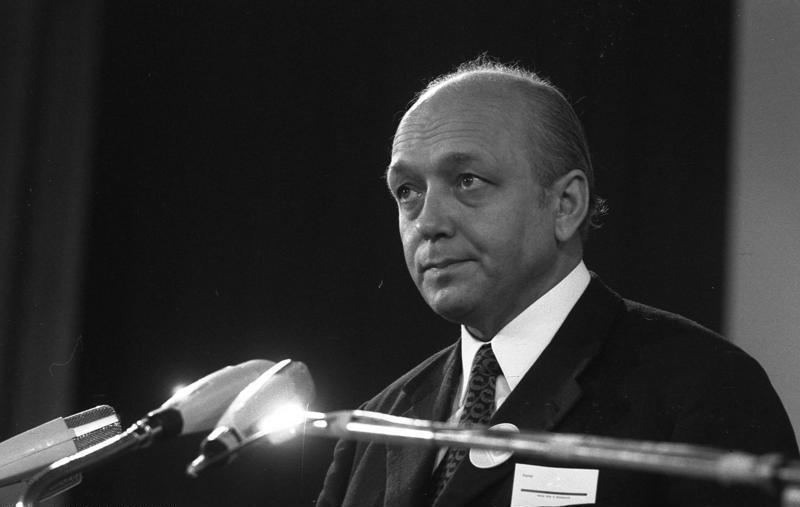
- Narjes in 1972

Schleswig-Holstein Minister of Economy and Transport

Personal details
- Born: 30 January 1924 Soltau, Germany
- Died: 26 January 2015 (aged 90) Bonn, Germany
- Party: CDU Christian Democratic Union of Germany (CDU)

Military service
- Branch/service: Kriegsmarine
- Rank: Leutnant zur See

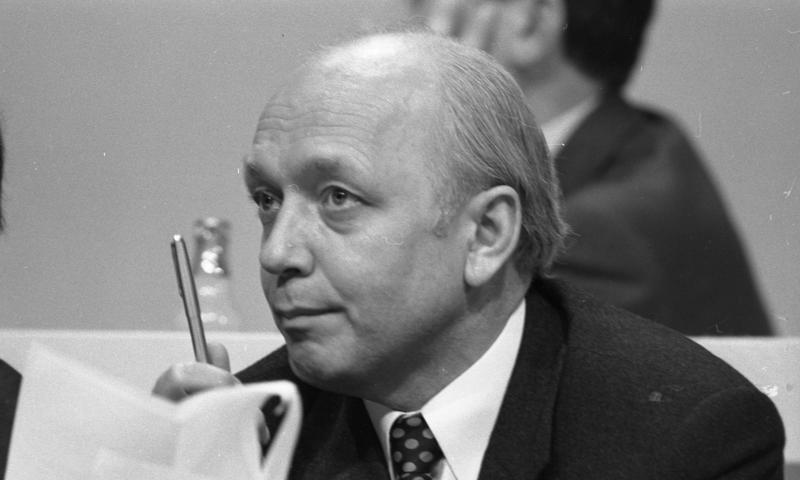
Karl-Heinz Narjes in 1973

Karl-Heinz Narjes (30 January 1924 – 26 January 2015) was a German Christian Democratic (CDU) politician. From 1969 to 1973 he was Minister for Economy and Transport of the State of Schleswig-Holstein and from 1981 to 1988 he was a European Commissioner.

During World War II, Narjes was a soldier in Kriegsmarine serving on a submarine U-91 with the rank of Leutnant zur See. After the submarine was sunk by the British Navy on 26 February 1944 eastwards of the Azores, Narjes became a prisoner of war of Britain.

From 1971 to January 1973, Narjes was a member of the Landtag of Schleswig-Holstein, i.e. the state parliament. From 1972 to 1981, he was a member of the Bundestag.

In the 1981–1985 Thorn Commission, Narjes was Commissioner for Parliamentary Relations and for Competition

In the 1985–1988 Delors Commission, he was a Vice-President of the Commission and Commission for Industry, information technology and science and research.

Political offices
Preceded by Guido Brunner	German European Commissioner; 1981–1985	Succeeded by Alois Pfeiffer
Preceded by Étienne Davignon as European Commissioner for the Internal Market, the Customs Union and Industrial Affairs	European Commissioner for the Internal Market, Industrial Innovation, the Customs Union, the Environment, Consumer Protection and Nuclear Safety; 1981–1985	Succeeded by Lord Cockfield as European Commissioner for Internal Market and Services
