= Claude Cheysson =

French politician (1920–2012)

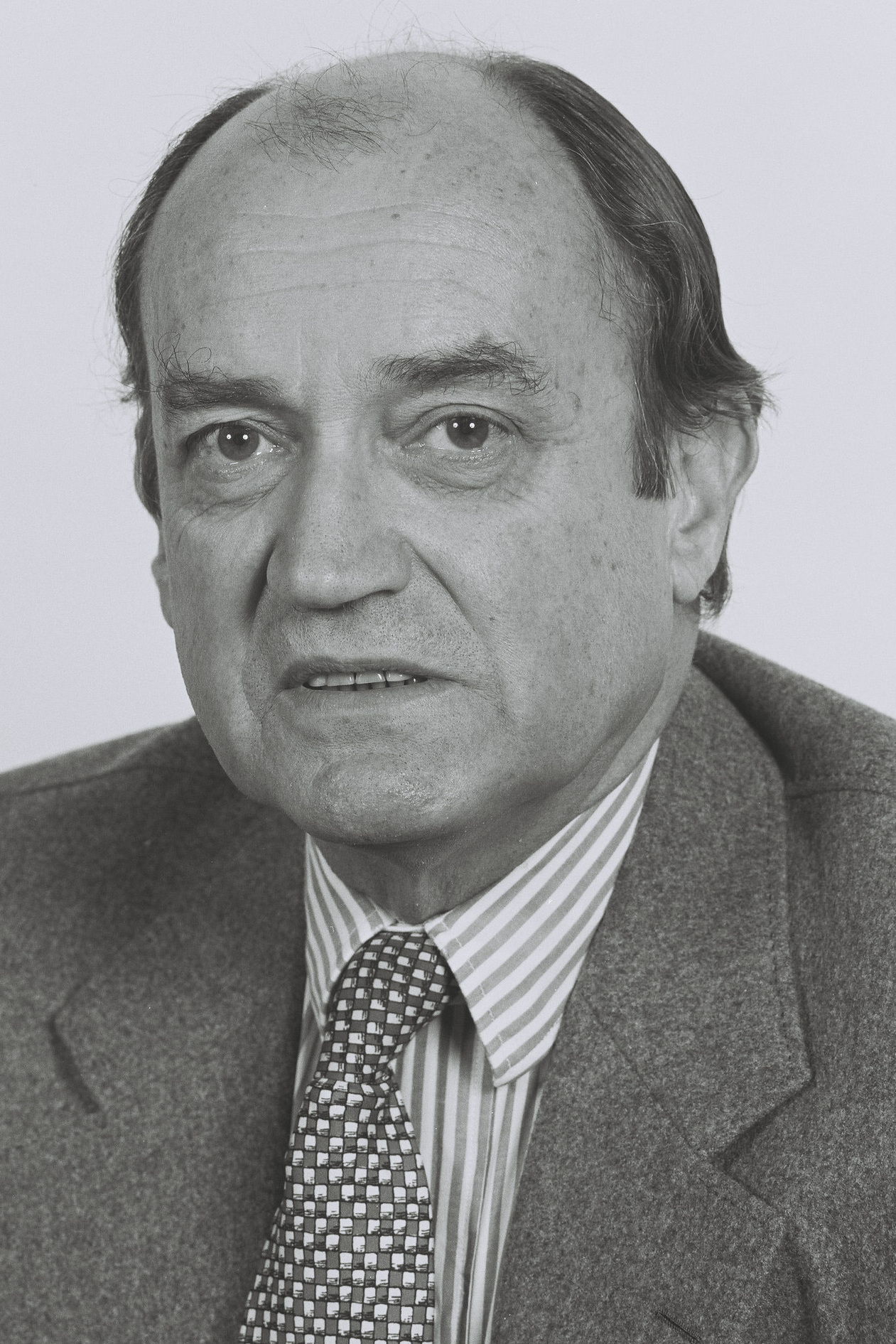
- Cheysson in 1980

Minister of External Affairs
- In office 22 May 1981 – 7 December 1984
- President: François Mitterrand
- Prime Minister: Pierre Mauroy; Laurent Fabius
- Preceded by: Jean François-Poncet
- Succeeded by: Roland Dumas

European Commissioner^{[Portfolios]}
- In office 5 January 1985 – 5 January 1989
- President: Jacques Delors
- Preceded by: Lorenzo Natali
- Succeeded by: Abel Matutes
- In office 6 January 1973 – 23 April 1981
- President: François-Xavier Ortoli; Roy Jenkins; Gaston Thorn
- Preceded by: Jean-François Deniau
- Succeeded by: Edgard Pisani

Personal details
- Born: 13 April 1920 16th arrondissement of Paris, France
- Died: 15 October 2012 (aged 92) 6th arrondissement of Paris, France
- Party: Socialist Party
- Education: École polytechnique ÉNA

Claude Cheysson (French pronunciation: [klod ʃɛsɔ̃]; 13 April 1920 – 15 October 2012) was a French Socialist politician who served as Foreign Minister in the government of Pierre Mauroy from 1981 to 1984.

== Career ==
Cheysson was born in Paris and attended the Cours Hattemer, a private school. He fled from France during World War II and joined the 2nd Armored Division of General Leclerc, serving as a second lieutenant in the 12th Chasseurs d'Afrique Regiment. He joined the Foreign Ministry in 1948 and became head of the liaison service with the West German authorities the following year. As he moved through the ranks of the Foreign Ministry, he served as counsellor to the president of the government of French Indochina in 1952, cabinet chief of Premier Pierre Mendès France from 1954 to 1955, and general secretary of the Commission for Technical Cooperation in Africa from 1957 to 1962. He was director of the Organisme Saharien from 1962 until 1965, and ambassador to Indonesia from 1966 to 1969.

In 1973, Cheysson was appointed the French European Commissioner. His first post, which he held until 1977, was in charge of development policy, cooperation, budgets, and financial control. From 1977 until 1981, he took on the development portfolio.

In 1981 he left the commission and became a member of the French Government, serving as Minister of Foreign Affairs until 1984. (The ministry was renamed as the Ministry of External Relations, but the previous name was re-established in 1986.) He joined the Delors Commission, where he was responsible for Mediterranean policy and north–south relations, from 1985 to 1989.

By 1999, Cheysson joined the Collectif Liberté pour l'Afghanistan, an organization lobbying for the West to stop tolerating the Taliban and "Osama bin Laden, the millionaire Saudi financier of terror".

== Notes ==
^{Commissioner for Development from 6 January 1973 to 23 April 1981; Commissioner for Budget and Financial Control from 6 January 1973 to 5 January 1977; Commissioner for Mediterranean Policy and North-South Relations from 5 January 1985 to 5 January 1989.}

== Bibliography ==
- Rulers.org

Political offices
Preceded by Jean François-Poncet	Minister of External Affairs; 1981–1984	Succeeded by Roland Dumas
