= Internal Audit Service (European Commission) =

Department of the European Commission

The Internal Audit Service or IAS is a Directorate-General (DG) of the European Commission that was established in 2001 to contribute to an increased accountability of the commission.

The Commissioner responsible for the IAS is Piotr Serafin, who chairs the commission's Audit Progress Committee.

The director-general of the IAS is the Internal Auditor of the commission.

== Mission ==
The mission of the IAS is to:

- perform an independent assessment of the effectiveness of governance, risk management, and control processes for operations, activities and financial transactions (‘assurance’)
- provide advice, insight and foresight.

== Organisation and leadership ==
The IAS serves under the leadership and responsibility of the Internal Auditor of the commission, a position created in the Financial Regulation. The Internal Auditor of the commission is Director-General of the IAS and Chief audit executive (CAE) as defined in the Global Internal Audit Standards.

The IAS has approx. 150 permanent staff. It is organized into three Directorates.

=== List of Internal Auditors of the European Commission ===
| # | Name | Period |
|---|---|---|
| 1 | Jules Muis | July 2001 – March 2004 |
| 2 | Walter Deffaa | August 2004 – May 2009 |
| 3 | Brian Gray | June 2009 – June 2012 |
| 4 | Philippe Taverne | September 2012 – August 2016 |
| 5 | Manfred Kraff | March 2017 – May 2023 |
| 6 | Agnieszka Kaźmierczak | October 2023 to present |

Between 2009 and 2023 the function of the internal auditor of the Commission and director-general of the IAS was entrusted successively to Brian Gray, Philippe Taverne and Manfred Kraff, who had all previously been deputy directors general of Directorate-General for Budget and the accounting officers of the commission (equivalent to CAO, chief accounting officer). The appointment of Manfred Kraff and practice of appointing former accounting officers as the internal auditor of the commission was subject of a complaint with the European Ombudsman.

Since October 2023, the Director-General of the IAS has been Agnieszka Kaźmierczak.

== History ==
=== Background ===
The European Commission adopted its first Financial Regulation in 1962, in which internal control was implemented by separating the roles of authorising officer, financial controller and accounting officer. However, as the Commission grew and became more complex, the European Court of Auditors (the EU's external auditor) began to call for the audit of systems and controls, and advocated an independent audit service within the commission. The ECA published an opinion in 1989 promoting the concept of internal auditing, and in 1997 recommended that a real internal audit function to be created.

5.12. On the express condition that the authorising officer's role is strengthened..., the financial controller's duties could develop into those of a real internal auditor.

— Opinion 4/97 of the Court of Auditors

A Commission decision from 1990 requested the Financial Controller to set up such a function, which was further developed under the programme of reform of financial management proposed in 1995 (the SEM2000). This audit function seems to have been re-focused on controls relating to structural funds, as Phase III progress reports of SEM2000 don't mention it - this modest audit function was little known and had little impact on the services of the commission.

=== The Santer Commission ===
After a serving Commission official made public allegations of fraud and financial mismanagement by members of the Santer Commission, in December 1998 the European Parliament refused to grant discharge on the 1996 accounts to the commission. In addition, a motion of no confidence was introduced. In early 1999 Commission President Jacques Santer admitted that there had been irregularities, but threatened to resign if Parliament exerted further pressure. In response, Parliament called for a committee of independent experts to look into ways of improving financial management and control. After receiving the first report of the so-called Wise Men in March 1999, the Santer Commission decided to collectively resign. In their Second Report, the Wise Men suggested in clear terms that the underlying problem is that the internal audit service is not perceived as a central department at the service of the entire Commission... Based on international best practices and the definition of internal audit as proposed by the Institute of Internal Auditors (IIA), the Wise Men recommended setting up a specialised Internal Audit Service outside the regular structure of directorates-general, reporting directly to the President of the commission.

The task of setting up the new service was allocated to the Commissioner responsible for institutional reform, Neil Kinnock

=== Reforming the Commission ===
In response to the Wise Men's report, an Administrative Reform Task Force was set up to draft the Reform White papers. The task force looked at financial controls, strategic planning and programming and the modernisation of personnel policy. The basis for establishing the IAS was recommendation 35 of the Wise Men's report proposing A professional and independent Internal Audit Service. Recommendation 37 also mentioned a specialised internal control function in each DG that would help establishing effective financial management. The Commission task force worked with the European Court of Auditors, the Wise Men committee, the World Bank and the EIB in developing the new control framework. Before this could be implemented, the Financial Regulation of the Commission needed to be changed (requiring a vote by all member states) to abolish the centralized ex-ante controls performed by DG Financial Control.

=== 20 years of the IAS ===
The IAS became an independent service in July 2001. The establishment of the new service was part of the reforms enacted at the Commission following the adoption of the Reform White Paper of 2000. As part of these reforms, Internal Audit Capabilities (IACs) were created in each DG, together with the Audit Progress Committee (APC), which oversees the work of both the IAS and IACs.

An independent and professional Internal Audit Service will be set up under the direct responsibility of the Vice-President for Reform...

— Action 68 of the Reform White Paper

The IAS set out a programme of in-depth audits of all DGs and Agencies that came under the new Financial Regulation. Apart from auditing, it also aimed to provide methodological support for audit activities to the IACs in each DG.

In 2006 IAS carried out the first quality review of the Internal Audit Capabilities. In 2007 its Mission Charter was updated, along with introducing a model charter for IACs.

In 2011 IAS completed the first overall opinion into the state of internal control in the commission. In the same year, it became the internal auditor of the newly established European External Action Service.

== See also ==
- OLAF
