= Cianciulli =

Cianciulli is a surname. Notable people are:

- Emil V. Cianciulli (1930–2019), American lawyer
- Leonarda Cianciulli (1894–1970), Italian serial killer
- Matthew Cianciulli (1942–2008), American politician
- Michele Cianciulli (1895–1965), Italian lawyer, historian, and philosopher
- Michele Angelo Cianciulli (1734–1819), Sicilian marquis and politician
