= Guido Colonna di Paliano =

Italian aristocrat, diplomat and European Commissioner

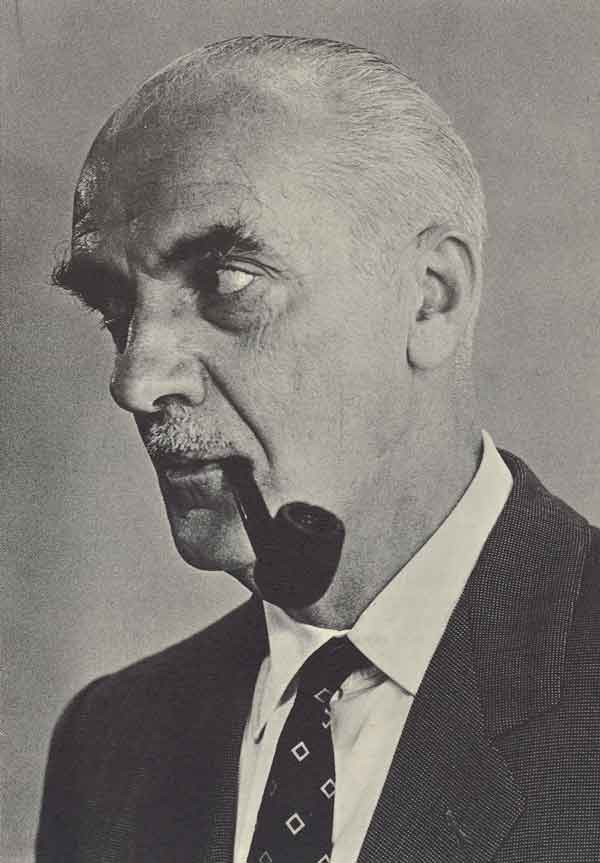
- Colonna in 1970

European Commissioner for Industrial Affairs
- In office 2 July 1967 – 8 May 1970
- President: Jean Rey
- Preceded by: Position established
- Succeeded by: Altiero Spinelli (Industrial Affairs and Trade)

European Commissioner for Internal Market
- In office 30 July 1964 – 2 July 1967
- President: Walter Hallstein
- Preceded by: Giuseppe Caron
- Succeeded by: Hans von der Groeben (Internal Market and Regional Policy)

Personal details
- Born: 16 April 1908 Naples, Italy
- Died: 27 January 1982 (aged 73) Naples, Italy
- Party: Christian Democracy
- Spouse: Tatiana Conus
- Children: 3
- Education: University of Naples

Don Guido Colonna dei principi di Paliano (16 April 1908 – 27 January 1982) was an Italian diplomat and European Commissioner.

== Early life ==
Guido Colonna di Paliano was born on 16 April 1908 into the Colonna family, from the branch of the Princes of Paliano and the sub-branch of the Princes of Summonte. He was the seventh child, and fourth son, of Don Stefano Colonna, dei principi di Paliano (1870–1948) and Maria Dorotea Cianciulli (1875–1942). His elder brother, Carlo, succeeded their uncle as 5th Prince of Summonte in 1956. His sister, Donna Giovanna Colonna, was the wife of Count Gerardo Giuseppe Dentice di Frasso (a son of Prince Luigi Dentice di Frasso).

His paternal grandfather was Don Edoardo Colonna, 3rd Prince of Summonte. The diplomat and Italian ambassador to London during the First World War, Marquess Guglielmo Imperiali (1858–1944), was the husband of his paternal aunt. Through his mother, he was a descendant of Michelangelo, Marquess Cianciulli (1734-1819), a jurist and Minister of Justice of the Kingdom of Naples, famous for settling the bill of law abolishing feudalism in that Kingdom.

Guido Colonna graduated with a degree in law in 1930 from the University of Naples.

== Career ==
Before the Second World War, Guido Colonna served in America as Italy's vice-consul to New York City from 1934 to 1937 and then to Toronto from 1937 to 1939. From 1939 to 1940 he was secretary of the Italian embassy in Cairo.

After the war, he was Secretary-General of the Italian delegation at the Marshall Plan negotiations (October 1947-March 1948), then Deputy Secretary-General of the Organisation for European Economic Co-operation (10 May 1948-July 1956). In 1956, he was appointed deputy general director for political affairs in the Italian foreign affairs ministry. He was promoted to the rank of minister on 20 October 1957. From December 1958 to July 1962, he was the Italian ambassador to Norway, succeeding Paolo Vita Finzi. He was deputy secretary general of NATO from 1962 to 1964.

On 30 July 1964, he succeeded Giuseppe Caron as European Commissioner for Internal Market & Services in the second Hallstein Commission and he remained in the succeeding Rey Commission of 1967 as Industry Commissioner until his resignation in May 1970 just before the commission's term of office expired. His resignation from the Rey Commission and the subsequent delay in appointing a successor confirmed reports that the Member States would not renew Rey's mandate which expired at the end of June 1970.

After the end of his political career, Guido Colonna di Paliano returned to the private sector as President of the Italian department store chain La Rinascente. He also became a member of the Trilateral Commission.

== Personal life ==
On 8 June 1938 in New York, Colonna, then Italian vice consul at Toronto, married Tatiana Conus, daughter of Julius Conus (Yúlij Eduárdovič Konyús), a Russian pianist and composer of French origin, and of Princess Maria Alexandrovna Lieven. She was born in Moscow on 1 December 1916 and died in Milan on 29 July 2009. They had three children:

- Don Piero Colonna (b. 1938), who was born in Toronto.
- Don Stefano Colonna (b. 1940), who was born in Cairo.
- Donna Maria Cristina Colonna (b. 1941), who was born in Stockholm and married Count Patrice de Vogüé in Paris in 1967. He was a descendant of the diplomat and archaeologist Melchior de Vogüé and owner of the Château de Vaux-le-Vicomte, a famous historical French château which he received from his father on the day of his marriage.

Tatiana Colonna and her children are the subjects of a story told by Italian writer Curzio Malaparte in his war novel Kaputt (published in 1944): she cures them of their fear of birds, brought on by their association with a sparrow trapped in their bedroom with the bombings they have experienced in Naples.

Political offices
Preceded by Giuseppe Caron	Italian European Commissioner; 1964–1970; Served alongside: Lionello Levi Sandri, Edoardo Martino	Succeeded by Franco Maria Malfatti
Preceded by Giuseppe Caron	Italian European Commissioner; 1964–1970; Served alongside: Lionello Levi Sandri, Edoardo Martino	Succeeded by Altiero Spinelli
Preceded by Giuseppe Caron	European Commissioner for Internal Market; 1964–1967	Succeeded by Hans von der Groeben as European Commissioner for Internal Market and Regional Policy
New office	European Commissioner for Industrial Affairs; 1967–1970	Succeeded by Altiero Spinelli as European Commissioner for Industrial Affairs and Trade
