= EU competition commission =

EU competition commission may refer to:

- European Union competition law
- European Commissioner for Competition
