= Margrethe Vestager =

Danish politician (born 1968)

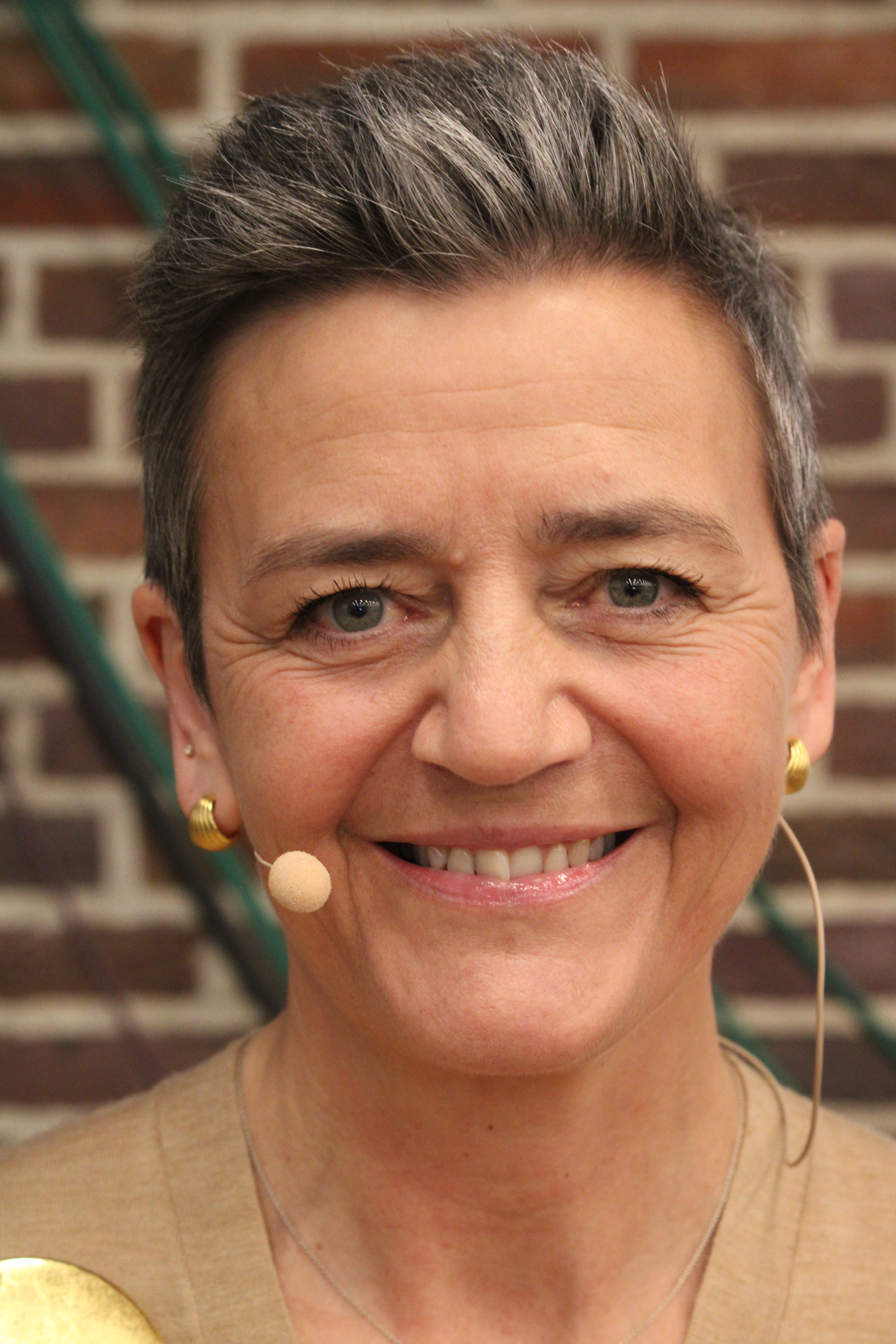
- Vestager in 2026

Executive Vice President of the European Commission for A Europe Fit for the Digital Age
- In office 1 December 2019 – 30 November 2024
- Commission: Von der Leyen I
- Preceded by: Position established (Note: Mariya Gabriel as Commissioner for Digital Economy and Society and Maroš Šefčovič as Acting European Commissioner for Digital Single Market)
- Succeeded by: Henna Virkkunen

European Commissioner for Competition
- In office 1 November 2014 – 30 November 2024
- Commission: Juncker; Von der Leyen I
- Preceded by: Joaquín Almunia
- Succeeded by: Teresa Ribera

Deputy Prime Minister of Denmark
- In office 3 October 2011 – 2 September 2014
- Prime Minister: Helle Thorning-Schmidt
- Preceded by: Lars Barfoed
- Succeeded by: Morten Østergaard

Minister of the Economy and Interior
- In office 3 October 2011 – 2 September 2014
- Prime Minister: Helle Thorning-Schmidt
- Preceded by: Brian Mikkelsen (Economy); Bertel Haarder (Interior)
- Succeeded by: Morten Østergaard

Leader of the Social Liberal Party
- In office 15 June 2007 – 2 September 2014
- Preceded by: Marianne Jelved
- Succeeded by: Morten Østergaard

Minister of Education
- In office 23 March 1998 – 27 November 2001
- Prime Minister: Poul Nyrup Rasmussen
- Preceded by: Ole Vig Jensen
- Succeeded by: Ulla Tørnæs

Minister of Ecclesiastical Affairs
- In office 23 March 1998 – 21 December 2000
- Prime Minister: Poul Nyrup Rasmussen
- Preceded by: Ole Vig Jensen
- Succeeded by: Johannes Lebech

Personal details
- Born: 13 April 1968 (age 58) Glostrup, Denmark
- Party: Social Liberal Party
- Other political affiliations: Alliance of Liberals and Democrats for Europe Party
- Spouse: Thomas Jensen (m. 1994)
- Children: 3
- Education: University of Copenhagen

Margrethe Vestager (Note: Danish pronunciation: [mɑˈkʁeˀtə ˈvestˌɛˀjɐ]) (born 13 April 1968) is a Danish politician who formerly served as Executive Vice President of the European Commission for A Europe Fit for the Digital Age between December 2019 and November 2024 in the Von Der Leyen Commission and was European Commissioner for Competition between 2014 and 2024 under Commission Presidents Juncker and Von Der Leyen. Vestager is a member of the Danish Social Liberal Party, and of the Alliance of Liberals and Democrats for Europe Party (ALDE) on the European level.

Prior to joining the European Commission, she served in the Danish governments of Poul Nyrup Rasmussen as Minister for Ecclesiastical Affairs from 1998 to 2000 and Minister of Education from 1998 to 2001. She was leader of the Social Liberals from 2007 to 2014, and served as Minister of Economic Affairs and the Interior under Helle Thorning-Schmidt from 2011 to 2014.

Following the 2014 European Parliament election, Vestager was nominated as Denmark's European Commissioner in the Juncker Commission, becoming Commissioner for Competition. In the 2019 European Parliament election, she was one of ALDE's seven lead candidates. After the election, Vestager was nominated as the Renew Europe group's candidate for President of the European Commission. After the election of Ursula von der Leyen as President, Vestager was re-nominated as Denmark's Commissioner. She retained her Competition portfolio while also becoming one of the Commission's three Executive Vice Presidents, with responsibility for "A Europe Fit for the Digital Age".

In 2023, European media called Vestager a waning star. Mistakes of judgement overshadowed her second mandate with the European Commission, such as the unsuccessful appointment of a US economics professor as Chief Economist for competition. Despite these setbacks, her aggressive antitrust enforcement against Big Tech culminated in a 2024 European Court of Justice victory that upheld landmark tax rulings against Apple and Google, decisions widely viewed as sealing her legacy as a steadfast regulator and vindicating her potent EU trustbuster campaign.

In her capacity as Commissioner for Competition, Vestager has gained international recognition for investigating, fining, or bringing lawsuits against major multinational companies including Google, Apple Inc., Amazon, Facebook, Qualcomm, Siemens, Alstom, and Gazprom. She has been described as "the rich world's most powerful trustbuster" and "the world's most famous regulator". Vestager has been the target of criticism by American corporations and US President Donald Trump for her efforts throughout her tenure as European Commissioner for Competition.

== Early life and education ==
Vestager was born in Glostrup, Zealand, a daughter of Lutheran ministers Hans Vestager and Bodil Tybjerg. She grew up in Ølgod, and matriculated from Varde Upper Secondary school in 1986. She studied at the University of Copenhagen, graduating in 1993 with a degree in Economics.

== Political career ==
Vestager has been a professional politician since the age of 21, when she was appointed to the central board and executive committee of the SLP and its European Affairs Committee, and shortly afterwards as National Chairwoman of the Party.

In 2001, Vestager was elected to the Danish Parliament, becoming Chairwoman of its Parliamentary Group in 2007. She was appointed Minister of Education and Ecclesiastical Affairs in 1998.

On 15 June 2007 Vestager secured election as her Party's parliamentary group leader in the Folketing, replacing Marianne Jelved. When Denmark's Prime Minister Lars Løkke Rasmussen called an early election in 2011 after failing to secure majority lawmaker backing for his economic stimulus package, Vestager's Social Liberals and the Conservative People's Party formed a political alliance, pledging to work together no matter which political bloc would win the election.

=== Minister for Economic and Interior Affairs of Denmark, 2011–2014 ===
From 2011 until 2014 Vestager served as Minister for Economic and Interior Affairs in the three-party Social Democrat-led coalition government of Helle Thorning-Schmidt. Having forced through deep cuts in unemployment benefits of Denmark's generous social welfare system after the country's economy narrowly escaped recession in 2012, she was at one point considered by Danish media and pollsters as the most powerful person in government, even above Thorning-Schmidt.

In her time in office, chaired the meetings of economic and finance ministers of the European Union (ECOFIN) during Denmark's presidency of the Council of Ministers in 2012. In this capacity, she announced that the European Union would cede two of its seats on the board of the International Monetary Fund to emerging economies under a new power-sharing scheme for international financial institutions. She also worked closely with Jean-Claude Juncker to salvage Europe's financial sector and forge a European Banking Union.

Between 2011 and 2014, Vestager led Denmark's campaign against Basel III liquidity rules, arguing in favor of allowing banks to use 75 percent more in covered bonds to fill liquidity buffers than allowed under Basel III rules; at the time Denmark's $550 billion mortgage-backed covered bond market, part of the country's two-century-old mortgage system, was the world's largest per capita. In 2013 she ruled out slowing down steps toward stricter requirements for systemically important lenders and reiterated her stance that banks won't get tax breaks to help them through the transition caused by regulatory reform.

In May 2014, Vestager presented a growth package designed to drag Denmark's economy – at the time Scandinavia's weakest – out of its crisis, raising the country's structural output by 6 billion kroner ($1.1 billion) and cut costs for companies by 4 billion kroner in 2020 through 89 measures to improve the business climate and boost employment.

In 2013, Vestager held that "[in] our experience it's impossible to pursue Danish interests without being close to the core of Europe. You don't have influence or produce results if you're standing on the sideline."

=== European Commissioner for Competition, 2014–2019 ===
On 31 August 2014, Prime Minister Thorning-Schmidt nominated Vestager as Denmark's EU Commissioner in the Juncker Commission. Despite her repeated denials of campaigning for the Environment portfolio, eventually she was designated the Competition dossier in the Juncker Commission. On 3 October 2014, she won the European Parliament's backing following her confirmation hearing.

In her confirmation hearings, Vestager said she favored settlement of cases before they come to a final executive judgment, for reduced fines or negotiated concessions from the companies.

Within a few months in the office, she brought antitrust charges against Google; Almunia had initially opened the investigation into Google in 2010, and had reached a settlement deal with Google by 2014 but was unable to convince the European Commission to accept it before his term ended. Vestager inherited Almunia's case but has shown greater desire to continue pursuing Google/Alphabet over the alleged antitrust violations. Also, she initiated investigations into the tax affairs of Fiat, Starbucks, Amazon.com and Apple Inc. under competition rules. In 2014, she launched proceedings against Gazprom, one of Europe's main gas suppliers, over allegations of breaching EU antitrust rules by putting in place artificial barriers to trade with eight European countries: Estonia, Latvia, Lithuania, Poland, Czech Republic, Slovakia, Hungary and Bulgaria.

In January 2015, Vestager ordered Cyprus Airways to pay back over 65 million euros in illegal state aid received in 2012 and 2013 as part of a restructuring package; as a consequence, Cyprus suspended operations at its flag carrier resulting in 550 job losses and reduced competition.

In August 2016, after a two–year investigation, Vestager announced Apple Inc. received illegal tax benefits from Ireland. The Commission ordered Apple to pay a fine of €13 billion, plus interest, in unpaid Irish taxes for 2004–2014; the largest tax fine in history. In July 2020, the European General Court struck down the decision as illegal, ruling in favor of Apple. The ruling of the European General Court was later overturned by the European Court of Justice, who definitely confirmed the Commission's decision.

As a result of the EU investigation, Apple agreed to re-structure out of its 2004–2014 Irish BEPS tool, the Double Irish in Q1 2015; Apple's replacement Irish BEPS tool, the CAIA arrangement caused Irish 2015 GDP to rise by 34.4 per cent, and was labelled Leprechaun economics by Nobel Prize-winning economist, Paul Krugman in July 2016.

In July 2017, a fine of $2.7 billion against Alphabet (formerly Google) was levied based on the European Commission claim that Google breached antitrust rules. This fine was later appealed.

In October 2017, Vestager ordered Amazon to pay €250 million of back taxes, and in January 2018, the EU Commission fined Qualcomm €997 million for allegedly abusing its market dominance on LTE baseband chipsets. In July 2018, she fined Alphabet (Google) €4.3 billion for entrenching its dominance in internet search by illegally tying together their service and other mobile apps with Android. On 22 January 2019 she fined Mastercard €570 million for preventing European retailers from shopping around for better payment terms. In March 2019, Vestager ordered Google to pay a fine €1.49 billion for abusive practices in online advertising. Vestager's actions against American companies as competition commissioner received criticism from US President Donald Trump (who also dubbed her as the EU's "Tax Lady"), stating "She hates the United States, perhaps worse than any person I've ever met."

In February 2019, Vestager blocked a merger between the two large European rail companies Siemens and Alstom due to serious competition concerns, despite the fact that both the German and French governments had supported the merger.

=== Executive Vice President of the European Commission for a Europe Fit for the Digital Age, 2019–2024 ===
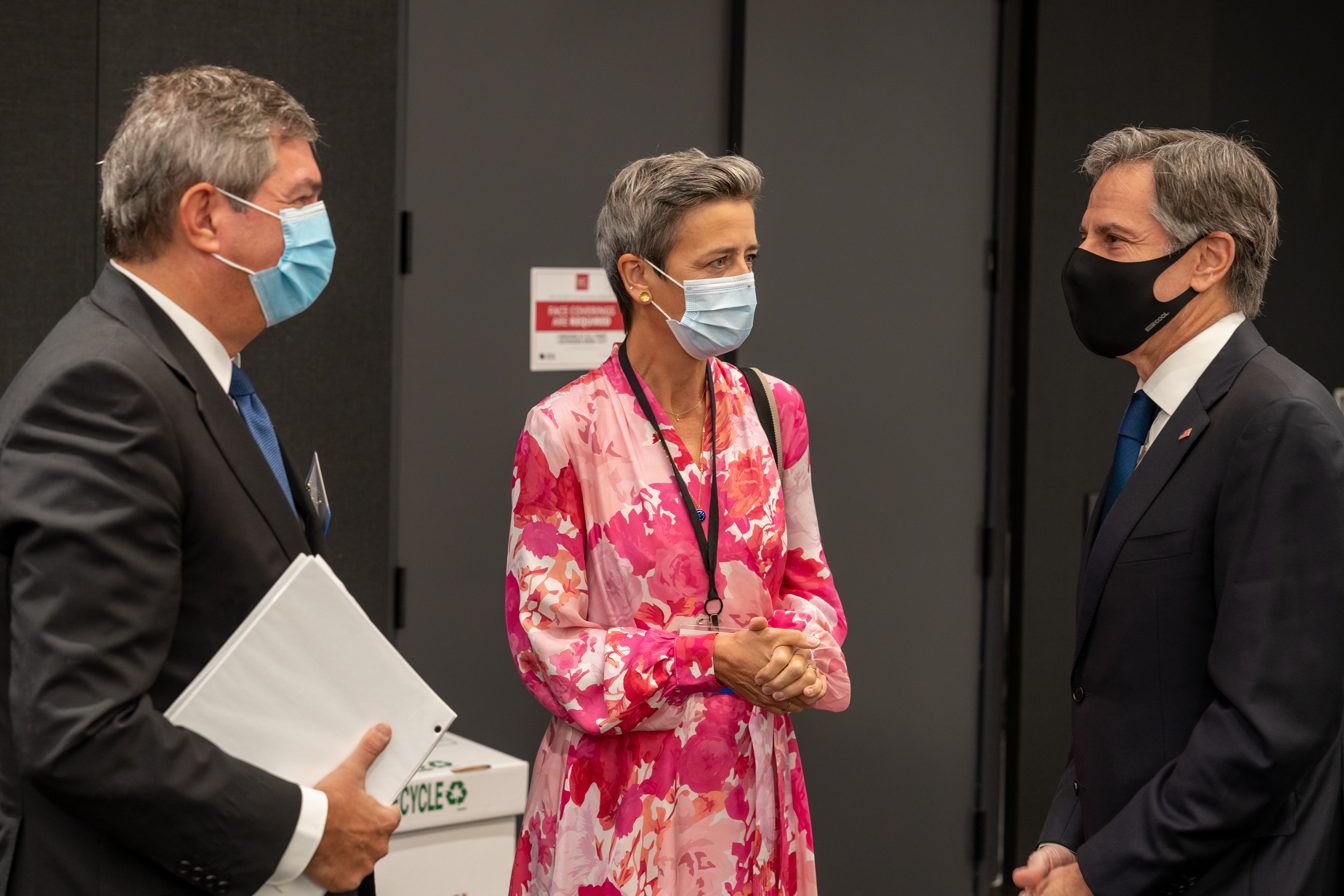
Vestager with Antony Blinken and Stavros Lambrinidis before the inaugural U.S.-EU Trade and Technology Council (TTC) meeting, 2021

Following the 2019 European Parliament election, Vestager was proposed as President of the European Commission. Vestager's campaign for the presidency of the European Commission encountered resistance in France, following her decision to veto the merger between Alstom and Siemens. The prohibition of the merger between two large European industrial companies angered the French president Emmanuel Macron and stood in the way of Vestager's bid for the presidency of the European Commission. In June 2019, Prime Minister Mette Frederiksen proposed that Vestager continue as Denmark's Commissioner for another five years. While, initially thought to become First Vice-President, Ursula von der Leyen has since proposed that Vestager, Frans Timmermans and Valdis Dombrovskis all serve as Executive Vice-Presidents of the Commission with Vestager having responsibility for a "Europe fit for the Digital Age".

In her role as Vice-President of the European Commission, Vestager had public and private disagreements with Commissioner Thierry Breton, the Frenchman in charge of a major overhaul of the digital rules in the European Union. As Vice-President of the European Commission, Vestager has been a co-chair of the Trade and Technology Council since its creation in 2021.

In July 2023, the appointment of the American Fiona Scott Morton to the post of chief economist in the Competition Directorate, with the support of Mrs Vestager, provoked an outcry in the European Parliament and in France, where leaders reacted negatively in the name of defending European interests. At a hearing at the European Parliament on 18 July, Vestager was unable to give a full list of cases for which Scott Morton, which had previously worked as a consultant to several companies, including GAFAM companies such as Amazon and Apple, would have to recuse herself, as the list was still being drawn, illustrating the extensive conflicts of interests of Scott Morton. On the same day, the French President Emmanuel Macron expressed his concerns regarding the choice of Scott Morton and his surprise that no qualified candidates could be found in Europe. He also noted with consternation Scott Morton's consulting work for the GAFAM. Scott Morton withdrew her candidacy the following day on 19 July 2023, to the regret to some academics that expressed support for Scott Morton. The failed nomination was labelled Fiona Scott Morton affair by commentators. It called into question the support by some of the European countries of the candidacy of Vestager to the presidency of the European Investment Bank, announced earlier that year.

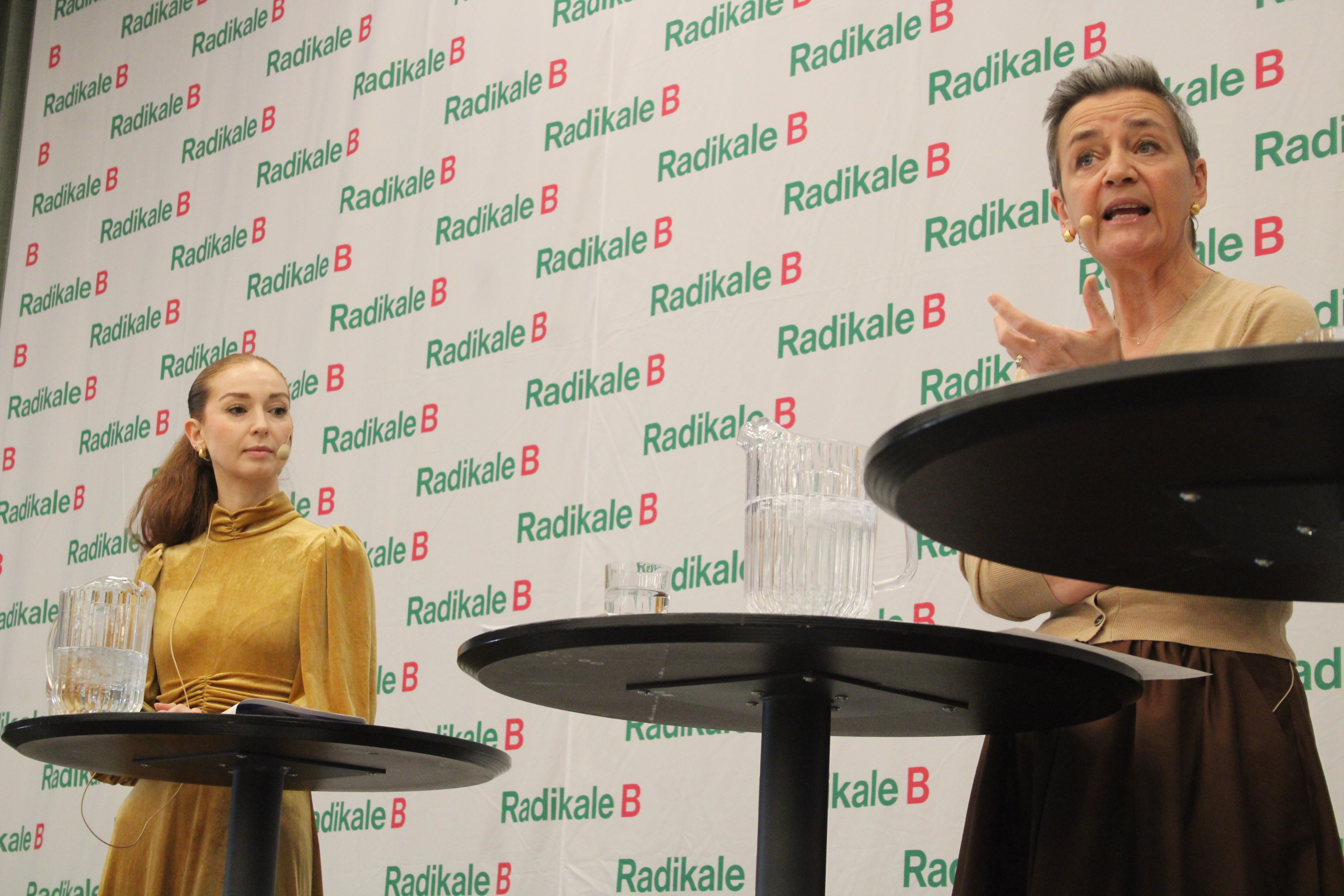
Vestager with Samira Nawa at their party's new year's meeting 2026

In September 2023, Vestager was released from her duties as Competition Commissioner by European Commission President Ursula von der Leyen and was replaced by Didier Reynders as Competition Commissioner in the interim. In December 2023, Nadia Calviño was announced as the new president of the EIB. Vincent van Peteghem, Minister of Finance of Belgium and Chair of EIB's Board of Governors, told reporters that EU finance ministers agreed that "Nadia Calviño will be a strong next president of the EIB, the biggest investment bank in the world.". Vestager subsequently resumed her duties as Competition Commissioner.

Following the resignation of Thierry Breton in September 2024, Vestager assumed his portfolio as Commissioner for Internal Market, and other related responsibilities, until the end of that Commission mandate.

== Other activities ==
=== Corporate boards ===
- Royal Greenland, Member of the Board of Advisors (2004–2007)

=== Non-profit organizations ===
- Augusta Victoria Hospital, Member of the Advisory Board (since 2025)
- Technical University of Denmark (DTU), Chair of the Board of Governors (since 2024)
- UNICEF Denmark, Member of the Executive Committee (2007–2011)
- Trilateral Commission, Member (2010–2011)
- Blaagaards Seminarium, Chairwoman of the Board (2006–2009)
- University College Copenhagen, Member of the Board (2006–2009)
- Copenhagen Business School, Institute for Management, Politics, and Philosophy, Chairwoman of the Advisory Board (2003–2008)
- European Council on Foreign Relations (ECFR), Member
- Trilateral Commission, Member of the European Group

=== Recognition ===
- 2017 – Doctorate honoris causa, KU Leuven

=== Acting credits ===
- Parlement Season 3 Episode 5 (2023) - cameo appearance as herself

== Criticism ==
=== Opposition to Italian recovery of local banks ===
In 2015, as the European Commissioner for Competition, Margrethe Vestager opposed the intervention of the Italian FITD (Inter-Bank Deposit Protection Fund) to support the capital increase of Banca Tercas, which had been approved by the Bank of Italy, defining it as an anti-competition state aid. This decision impeded similar interventions in favor of the recovery of other banks, such as Cassa di Risparmio di Ferrara, Banca delle Marche, Banca Etruria, CariChieti and Carige.

In 2019, following an appeal from Italy, FITD and Banca Popolare di Bari, the European General Court annulled the decision of Vestager, which was also based on the unproven assumption that FITD was using state-controlled resources. After an appeal from the European Commission, the European Court of Justice confirmed the previous judgement against the Commission. Former Governor of the Bank of Italy Ignazio Visco declared that the intervention of FITD could have avoided more serious consequences.

== Personal life ==
Vestager's husband is a gymnasium maths and philosophy teacher. They have three daughters, Maria, Rebecca, and Ella. Vestager served as an inspiration for the main character in Borgen, who tries to juggle family life and politics. She is also a knitter and a self-declared feminist. In 2021 she told Femina magazine that we were moving towards gender equality in the workplace "at a completely unacceptably slow speed". Vestager speaks Danish, English and some French.

== See also ==
- Double Irish arrangement, Apple's 2004–2014 Irish BEPS tool
- EU illegal State aid case against Apple in Ireland, 2004–2014 Commission case against Apple in Ireland
- Leprechaun economics, the effect of Apple's 2015 BEPS re-structuring on Ireland's GDP
- Single malt arrangement, Microsoft's post–2014 Irish BEPS tool
- CAIA arrangement, Apple's post–2015 Irish BEPS tool
- Ireland as a tax haven, overview of Ireland's BEPS tools

== Notes ==
Party political offices
Preceded by Grethe Erichsen	Chair of the Social Liberal Party; 1993–1997	Succeeded by Johannes Lebech
Preceded by Marianne Jelved	Leader of the Social Liberal Party in the Folketing; 2007–2011	Succeeded by Marianne Jelved
Preceded by Marianne Jelved	Leader of the Social Liberal Party; 2007–2014	Succeeded by Morten Østergaard
Political offices
Preceded by Ole Vig Jensen	Minister of Ecclesiastical Affairs; 1998–2000	Succeeded by Johannes Lebech
Preceded by Ole Vig Jensen	Minister of Education; 1998–2001	Succeeded by Ulla Tørnæs
Preceded by Lars Barfoed	Deputy Prime Minister of Denmark; 2011–2014	Succeeded by Morten Østergaard
Preceded by Brian Mikkelsen as Minister of the Economy	Minister of the Economy and Interior; 2011–2014	Succeeded by Morten Østergaard
Preceded by Bertel Haarder as Minister of the Interior	Minister of the Economy and Interior; 2011–2014	Succeeded by Morten Østergaard
Preceded by Connie Hedegaard	Danish European Commissioner; 2014–present	Incumbent
Preceded by Joaquín Almunia	European Commissioner for Competition; 2014–present	Incumbent
