= Giuseppe Caron =

Italian politician (1904–1998)

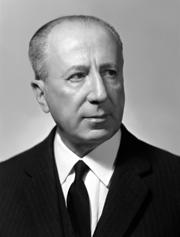
- Caron in 1963

European Commissioner for Internal Market
- In office 24 November 1959 – 15 May 1963
- President: Walter Hallstein
- Preceded by: Piero Malvestiti
- Succeeded by: Guido Colonna di Paliano

Personal details
- Born: 24 February 1904 Treviso, Italy
- Died: 3 March 1998 (aged 94) Treviso, Italy
- Party: Christian Democracy

Giuseppe Caron (24 February 1904 – 3 March 1998) was an Italian politician representing Christian Democracy (Democrazia Cristiana; DC) who was a Minister in successive governments from the 1950s to the 1970s, and a European Commissioner. He was born in Treviso.

Caron trained as a chemist and worked in the pharmaceutical industry and as a lobbyist. Later, in 1952, he became vice-president of the Italian Chamber of Commerce

During World War II Caron became involved in the resistance against the German Army and was a member of the DC Committee for National Release in Treviso.

He was elected to the Italian Senate in all legislative elections from the 1948 Italian general election to the 1972 Italian general election.

Caron's first political office was as under-secretary for Civil Aviation. He served as under-secretary for Public Works in the Government of Antonio Segni from 1955 to 1957, under-secretary for Defense in the 1957–1958 Governments of Adone Zoli and 1958–1959 Amintore Fanfani Government.

He became active in European politics as one of the Italian delegates at the Council of Europe.

In November (or December) 1959 he was appointed as one of the Italian European Commissioners on the first Hallstein Commission to replace Piero Malvestiti who resigned to become President of the European Coal and Steel Community. Caron took over Malvestiti's Internal Market portfolio.

His seat in the Senate was taken by Attilio Venudo.

Caron was re-appointed to the second Hallstein Commission which served from January 1962 and became a Vice-President of the Commission. He resigned from the commission in May 1963 having been re-elected to the Senate in the elections of April 1963. He was replaced in the commission by Guido Colonna di Paliano.

He then joined the governments of Aldo Moro from 1963 to 1968 where he served as under-secretary to the Budget minister. He held the same position in the first Government of Mariano Rumor from 1968 to 1969 and became Budget Minister in the second Rumor Government from 1969 to 1970.

Political offices
Preceded by Piero Malvestiti	Italian European Commissioner; 1959–1963; Served alongside: Giuseppe Petrilli, Lionello Levi Sandri	Succeeded by Guido Colonna di Paliano
Preceded by Piero Malvestiti	European Commissioner for Internal Market; 1959–1963	Succeeded by Guido Colonna di Paliano
