= Trade and Technology Council =

Diplomatic forum for EU-US Trade and Tech

The United States (orange) and European Union (green)

The Trade and Technology Council (TTC) is a transatlantic political body between the United States and European Union which serves as a diplomatic forum to coordinate technology and trade policy. It is composed of ten working groups, each focusing on specific policy areas. The formation of the TTC was first announced by US president Joe Biden and the European Commission president Ursula von der Leyen on June 15, 2021. The early agenda focused primarily on US-EU cooperation in technology, strategic sectors, market access, trade, democratic values and rule of law in the digital world, supply chain resilience, the global trade order and the EU's developing regulatory agenda like Digital Services Act, Data Act and Cloud Rules. The TTC was established under the leadership of five co-chairs – European Commission executive vice-president Margrethe Vestager, European Commission executive vice-president Valdis Dombrovskis, US secretary of state Antony Blinken, US secretary of commerce Gina Raimondo, and US trade representative Katherine Tai.

== Background ==
In summer of 2020, then-Trade Commissioner Phil Hogan approached the Trump administration with the idea of resetting the EU-U.S. relationship with a Trade and Technology Council at its heart. The TTC – which was also championed within the Commission by Executive Vice President Margrethe Vestager – would be meant to coordinate upstream trade, regulation and standard-setting on emerging technologies across the Atlantic. Brussels’ offer went relatively unheeded in the Trump Administration.

Almost at the same time on September 10, 2020 during the German EU presidency, the EU and China held the first High-Level Digital Dialogue, bringing together four Commissioners with 4 senior Chinese officials. The Dialogue – Europe’s first with a major tech power – focused on 5 areas: ICT standard setting, AI, product safety of articles sold online, DSTs and R&D. But the mood was considered tense and the dialogue of limited value in Brussels. The EU-China High-Level Digital Dialogue has not reconvened since.

Soon after at the September 2020 State of the European Union address, Commission president Ursula von der Leyen mentioned the EU’s desire to work on a trade and technology agenda with the White House regardless of the 2020 American election outcome. Following the November 2020 Biden-Harris victory calls began to emerge for a new effort at establishing US-EU alliance on democratic technology and the EU launched a much more intensive campaign for cooperation – releasing the December 2, 2020 Communication “A New Transatlantic Agenda for Global Change” which proposed the TTC as a central vehicle for cooperation with the relationship.

The Biden Administration made significant movement toward EU positions on a number of fronts. It rejoined the Paris Climate Accord, COVAX, the WHO, and indicated interest in rejoining the JCPOA. Furthermore, the administration and EU agreed to suspend $11.5 billion in tariffs resulting from the Boeing-Airbus dispute for 5 years. The two led OECD efforts to establish a minimum 15% corporate tax rate on companies with more than €750 million in annual revenues from 2023 onwards, generating around €150 billion new global tax revenues and redirecting over $125 billion taxable profit as a result of the location of economic activity. Together, this is intended to remove the potential of DSTs as an irritant between both sides of the Atlantic.

At the same time, the U.S. political climate was converging with the EU on a number of technology fronts: 1) both sides are closer than ever on data protection and privacy; content moderation and online safety; and market power of online platforms; 2) both sides indicated interest in a renewed industrial policy focused on avoiding supply chain bottlenecks, reducing climate emissions and furthering green technology; and 3) awareness of connectivity traps, supply chain vulnerabilities and weaponized technology interdependence have become a common geostrategic concern in both Brussels and Washington.

Despite Commission overtures, Biden administration policy reversals and greater convergence on digital and tech policy, the White House was slow to react to the Commission-led TTC idea. Until weeks prior to the June 15, 2021 EU-US Summit, it remained unclear whether the US would support the initiative at all. In advance of the Summit, Washington mounted pressure for a breakthrough on an interim Privacy Shield framework agreement that would create the space for greater focus on technology control issues (dual use export controls, investment screening, trustworthy vendors); industrial policy, R&D and supply chains; and increased cooperation on technical standard-setting – both bilaterally and in international bodies like the International Standards Organization (ISO), the International Electrotechnical Commission (IEC) and International Telecommunication Union (ITU).

The fact that a Biden visit to Brussels could not mount the necessary momentum to achieve an interim agreement on Privacy Shield was seen as a setback. At the Summit, however, President Biden, Commission president von der Leyen and Council president Charles Michel launched the TTC to:

- grow the bilateral trade and investment relationship;
- avoid new unnecessary technical barriers to trade;
- coordinate, seek common ground and strengthen global cooperation on technology, digital issues and supply chains;
- support collaborative research and exchanges;
- cooperate on compatible and international standards development;
- facilitate regulatory policy and enforcement cooperation and, where possible, convergence;
- promote innovation and leadership by U.S. and EU firms;
- and to strengthen other areas of cooperation.

Its ultimate objective is to “feed into coordination in multilateral bodies … and wider efforts with like-minded partners, with the aim of promoting a democratic model of digital governance.”

== Meetings ==
List of ministerial-level meetings
#	Date	Location	Statement	Attendees	Image
1	29 September 2021	Pittsburgh, Pennsylvania, United States	EU, US	Co-Chairs: U.S. secretary of state: Antony Blinken, U.S. secretary of commerce: Gina Raimondo, U.S. trade representative: Katherine Tai, European Commission executive vice president: Margrethe Vestager, European Commission executive vice president: Valdis Dombrovskis	
2	15-16 May 2022	Paris-Saclay, France	EU, US	Co-Chairs: U.S. Secretary of State: Antony Blinken, U.S. Secretary of Commerce: Gina Raimondo, U.S. Trade Representative: Katherine Tai, European Commission Executive Vice President: Margrethe Vestager, European Commission Executive Vice President: Valdis Dombrovskis; Additional attendees: European Commissioner: Thierry Breton	
3	5 December 2022	College Park, Maryland, United States	EU, US	Co-Chairs: U.S. Secretary of State: Antony Blinken, U.S. Secretary of Commerce: Gina Raimondo, U.S. Trade Representative: Katherine Tai, European Commission Executive Vice President: Margrethe Vestager, European Commission Executive Vice President: Valdis Dombrovskis; Additional attendees: U.S. Deputy Under Secretary of Labor Thea Lee, Jamaica Minister for Information Communication Technology Floyd Green, Kenya Cabinet Secretary for Information, Communication and the Digital Economy Eliud Owalo	
4	30-31 May 2023	Luleå, Sweden	EU, US	Co-Chairs: U.S. Secretary of State: Antony Blinken, U.S. Secretary of Commerce: Gina Raimondo, U.S. Trade Representative: Katherine Tai, European Commission Executive Vice President: Margrethe Vestager, European Commission Executive Vice President: Valdis Dombrovskis; Additional attendees: European Commissioner: Thierry Breton	
5	30 January 2024	Washington, D.C., United States	EU, US	Co-Chairs: U.S. Secretary of State: Antony Blinken, U.S. Secretary of Commerce: Gina Raimondo, U.S. Trade Representative: Katherine Tai, European Commission Executive Vice President: Margrethe Vestager, European Commission Executive Vice President: Valdis Dombrovskis; Additional attendees: European Commissioner: Thierry Breton	
6	4-5 April 2024	Leuven, Belgium	EU, US	Co-Chairs: U.S. Secretary of State: Antony Blinken, U.S. Secretary of Commerce: Gina Raimondo, U.S. Trade Representative: Katherine Tai, European Commission Executive Vice President: Margrethe Vestager, European Commission Executive Vice President: Valdis Dombrovskis; Additional attendees: European Commissioner: Thierry Breton	

=== September 2021 Pittsburgh Inaugural Meeting ===
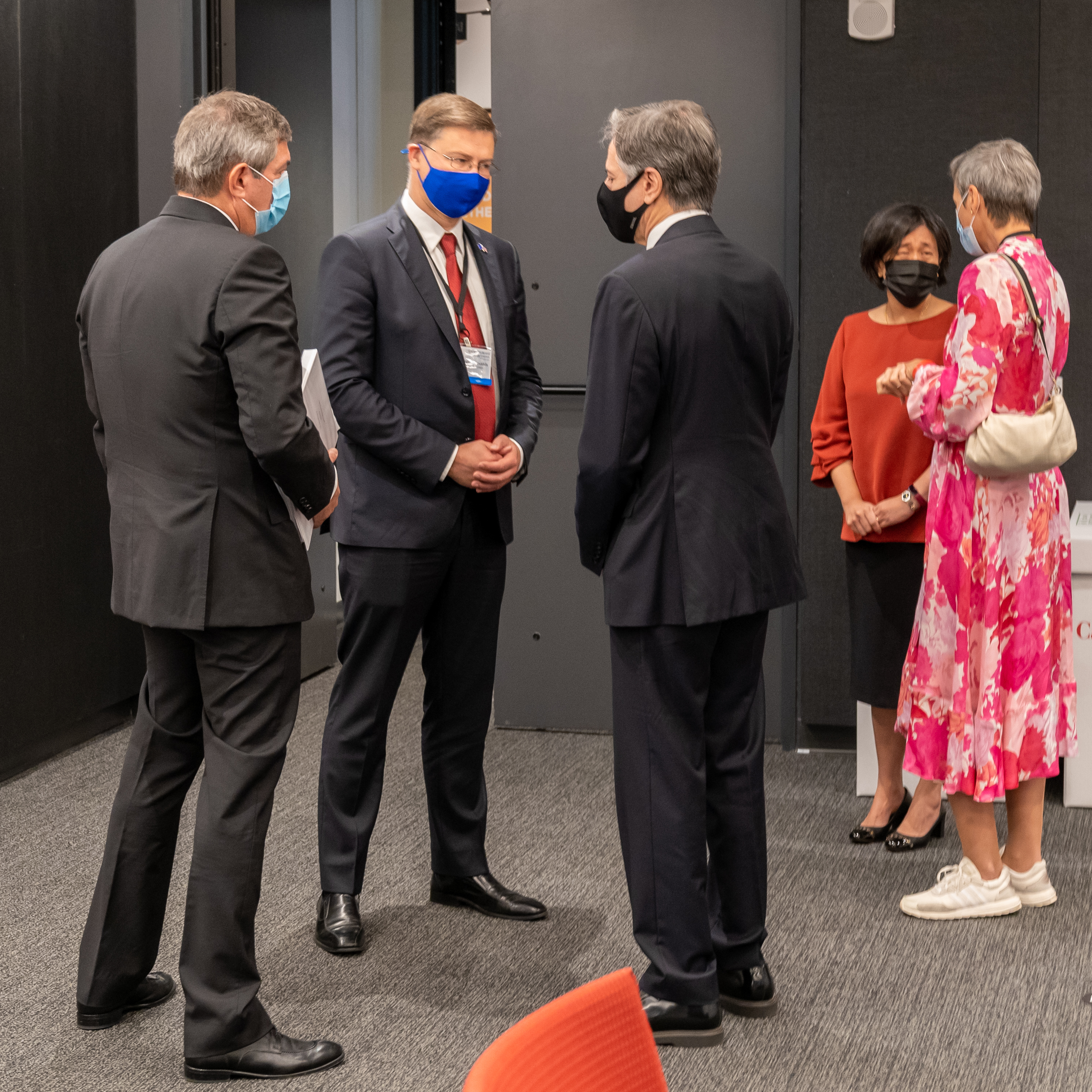
TTC meeting in Pittsburgh, U.S. on September 29, 2021

The first meeting of the TTC took place on September 29-30, 2021 in Pittsburgh. The initial meeting was called into question following the September 15, 2021 establishment of the security pact between the United States, Australia and the United Kingdom known as AUKUS. The AUKUS agreement led Australia to cancel a €56 billion Attack class diesel submarine contract with France, giving the French contract provider just hours notice before the contract was cancelled. In response, the French mounted a campaign to postpone the scheduled TTC meeting.

In a case of frantic diplomacy, French Industry Commissioner Thierry Breton – in some ways, a proxy for the French government – travelled to Washington, DC on September 20 to discuss supply chains and the future of EU-U.S. relations. Despite an announcement with Breton that the U.S. would lift the COVID-based travel restrictions for November 9th – an improvised concession to Europe organized to sooth damage caused by AUKUS – Breton called for a “pause and reset” of transatlantic relations, echoing the Paris position. Only strong Commission efforts and a coalition of Central and Northern member-states in a September 25 2021 COREPER meeting kept the Pittsburgh meeting on track.

On September 29-30, the 5 co-chairs met for 2 days in Pittsburgh to bring the TTC to life. The meeting began with a small stakeholder event at Mill 19, a converted steel mill now serving as a startup accelerator. Original plans for a press conference following the first day were scrapped following the AUKUS misstep. The meeting yielded a 17-page joint statement which includes 5 annexes and outlines a roadmap for future work. Overall, the TTC’s scope and ambition laid out in the Pittsburgh Joint Statement – with its 10 working groups covering a range of tech issues – exceeded expectations. The ten TTC working groups each focus on specific issues:

- Technology Standards
- Climate and Clean Tech
- Secure Supply Chains
- Information and Communication Technology and Services (ICTS) Security and Competitiveness
- Data Governance and Technology Platforms
- Misuse of Technology Threatening Security and Human Rights
- Export Controls
- Investment Screening
- Promoting Small and Medium-sized Enterprises (SME) Access to and Use of Digital Tools
- Global Trade Challenges

Noticeable absences, however, remained. First, it ringfenced the issue around antitrust and the Digital Markets Act taking it outside of the TTC and placing it in the separate EU-US Joint Technology Competition Policy Dialogue. Second, the TTC left the twin data irritants – Privacy Shield and extra-territorial data access under the US CLOUD Act – largely under-addressed, a sign of differences between the two partners.

=== Second Meeting ===
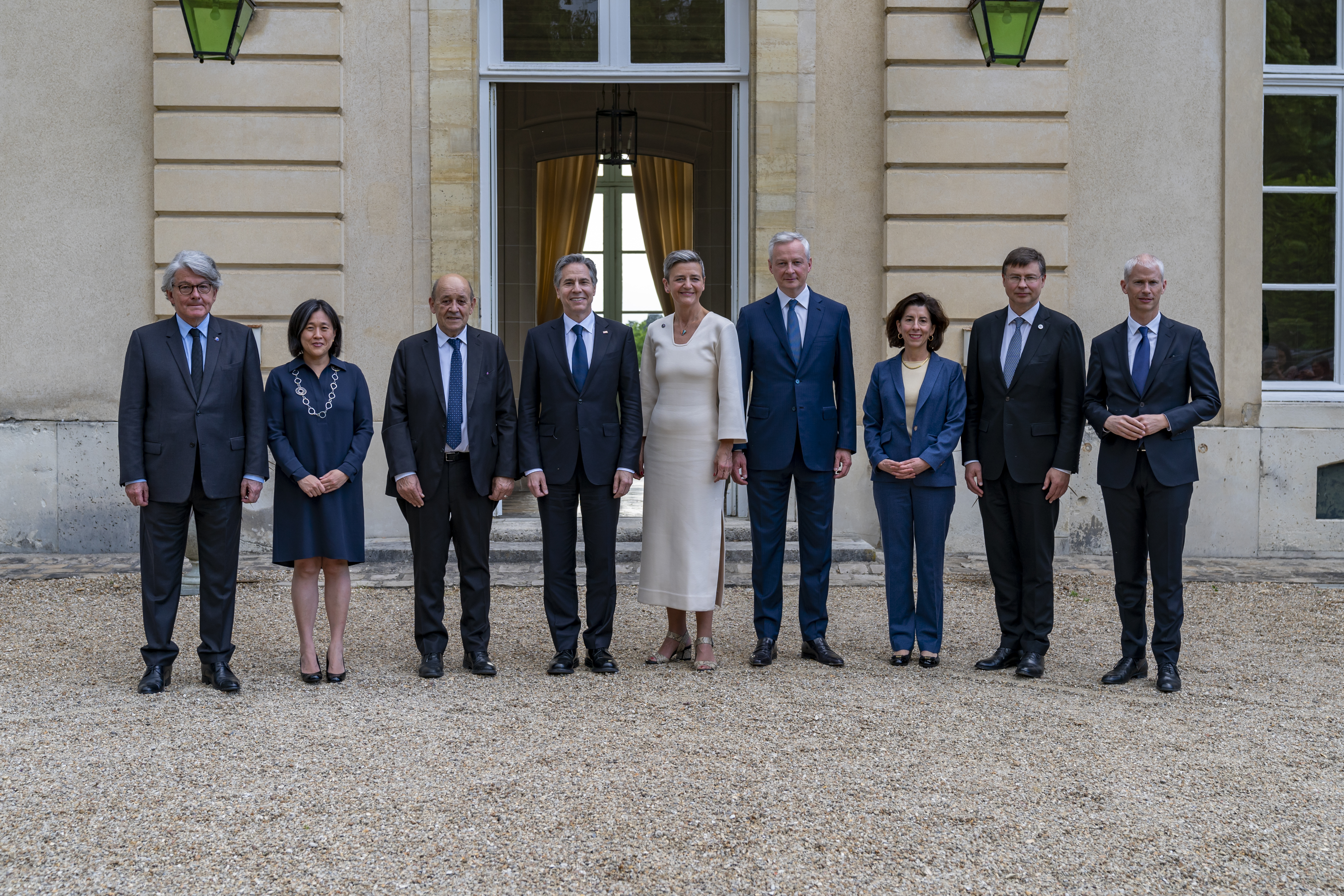
TTC meeting in Paris, France on May 15, 2022

The Joint Statement states that the second TTC meeting would take place in the second quarter of 2022 and both sides have indicated that it will take place in Europe during the French EU presidency. There is speculation that the meeting will thus take place in France and reflect Paris priorities, specifically around R&D and industrial policy on chip production. Other areas likely to increase in focus include: green technology, trusted cloud infrastructure and industrial data spaces, support for SMEs; deeper tech governance questions; infrastructure (particularly regarding German G7 priorities); and global trade issues, which have risen on the TTC agenda in recent weeks. If successful, in the mid term the TTC could address questions around AR/VR, quantum computing and blockchain technology, and NextGen Internet governance.

Beyond deepening bilateral cooperation, much of the second meeting considered the wider geopolitical context, particularly focusing on Russia’s war in Ukraine.

=== Third Meeting ===
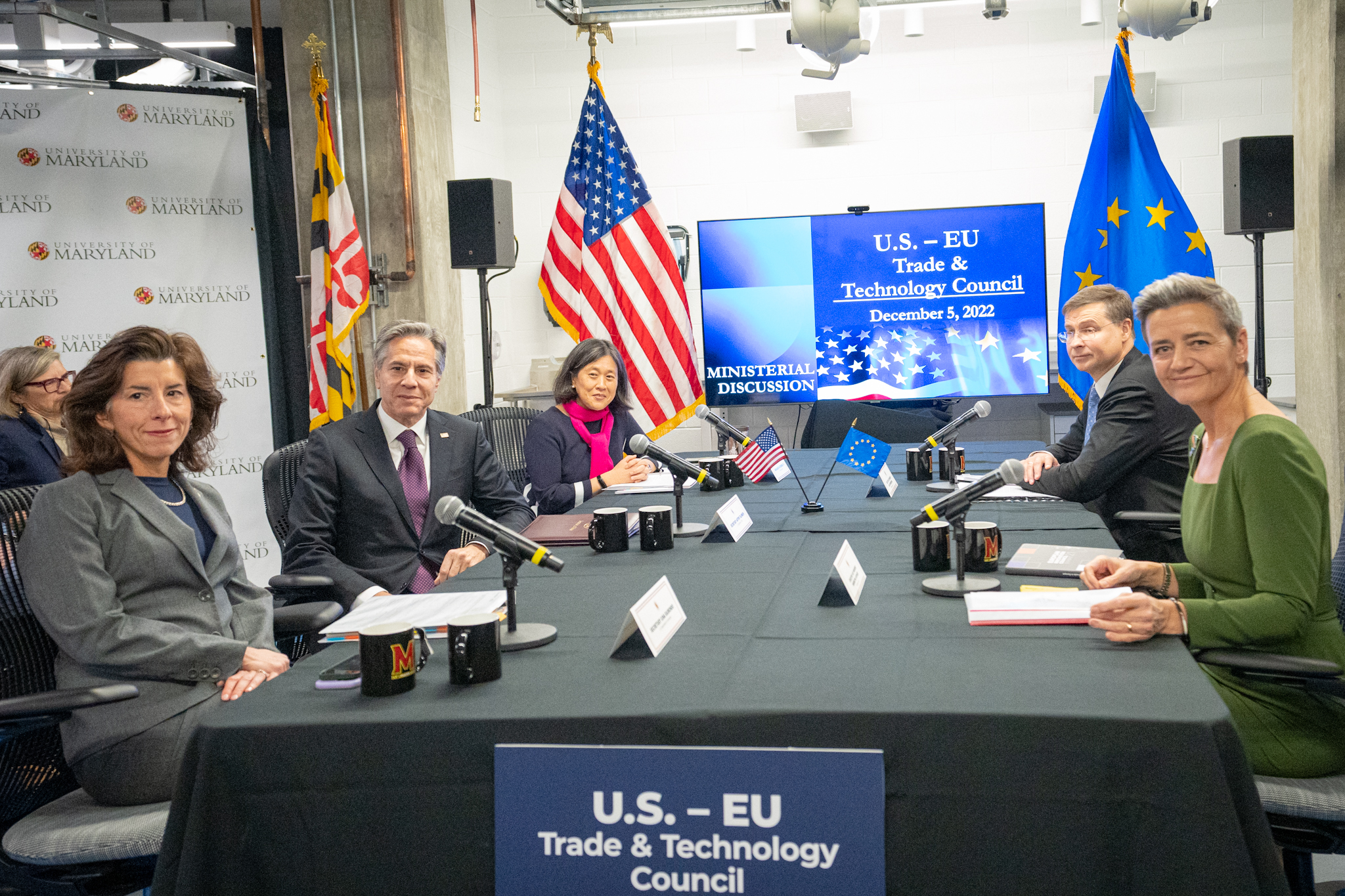
The TTC Ministerial Meeting at the University of Maryland on 5 December 2022

The third Ministerial Meeting of the Trade and Technology Council took place in College Park, Maryland.
