= Hans von der Groeben =

German politician (1907–2005)

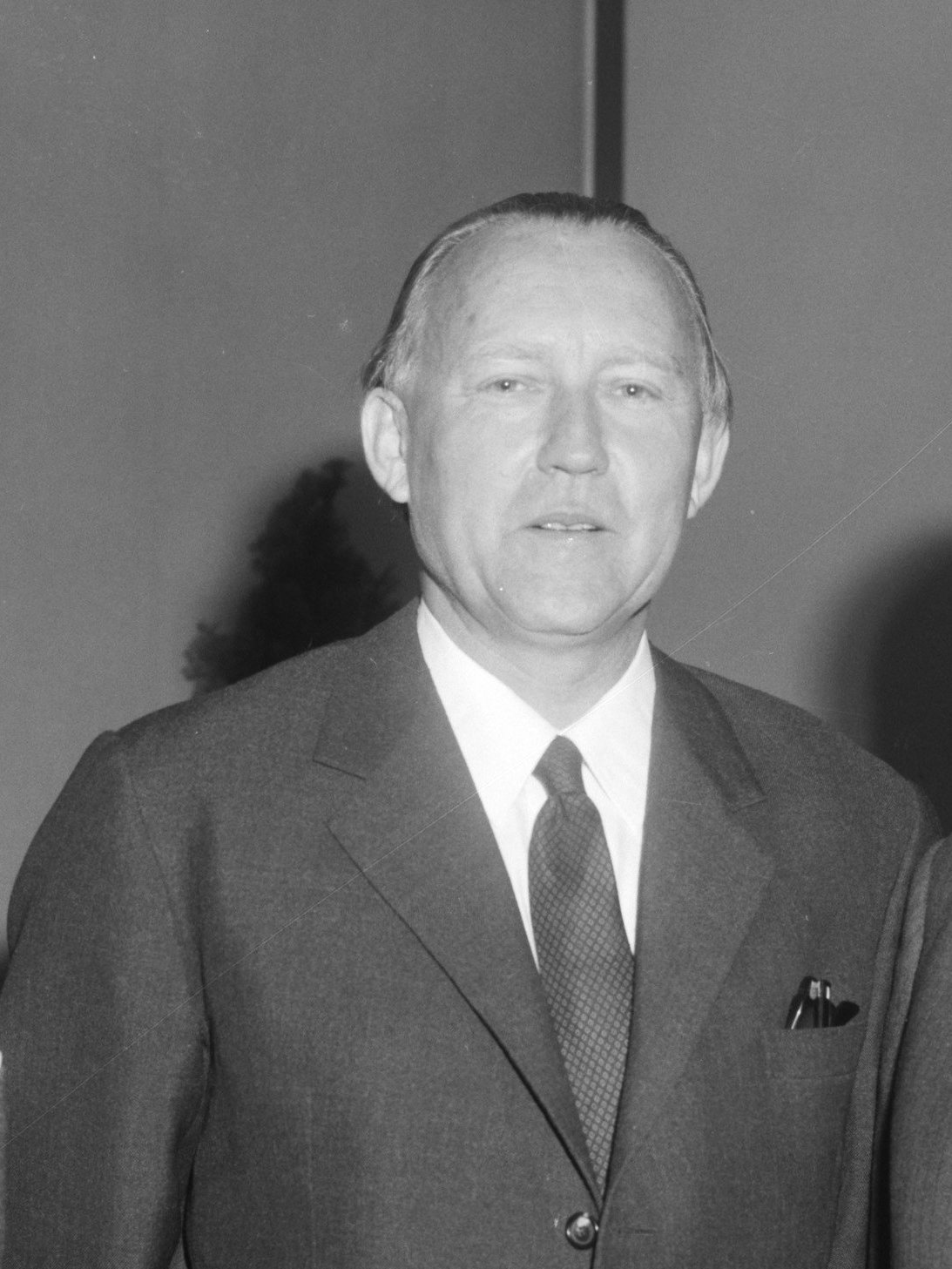
- Von der Groeben in 1965

European Commissioner for Internal Market and Regional Policy
- In office 2 July 1967 – 30 June 1970
- President: Jean Rey
- Preceded by: Guido Colonna di Paliano (Internal Market)
- Succeeded by: Wilhelm Haferkamp (Internal Market and Energy)

European Commissioner for Competition
- In office 7 January 1958 – 2 July 1967
- President: Walter Hallstein
- Preceded by: Position established
- Succeeded by: Maan Sassen

Personal details
- Born: 14 May 1907 Langheim, Germany (now Łankiejmy, Poland)
- Died: 6 March 2005 (aged 97) Rheinbach, Germany
- Party: Christian Democratic Union
- Education: University of Berlin; University of Bonn; University of Göttingen

Hans von der Groeben (14 May 1907 – 6 March 2005) was a German diplomat, lawyer, journalist and member of the European Commission.

A son of landowner Georg von der Groeben and Eva von Mirbach, he studied jurisprudence and political economics at the Universities of Berlin, Bonn and Göttingen. After the state exams, he became a government advisor in 1933 at the Ministry of Nutrition (Reichsernährungsministerium) and in 1937 transferred to his final advisory position for credit and cooperatives (Referats für das Kredit- und Genossenschaftswesen).

For periods during the Second World War, he served as a reserve in the armed forces, ending up as a first lieutenant. After the war, he became a director of government in the Treasury of Lower Saxony. Federal Minister for Economic Affairs Ludwig Erhard recruited him from there to work on Germany's response to the Schuman Declaration for better Franco-German relations. From 1953 he represented the Federal Government in the coordinating committee of the European Coal and Steel Community.

He ranks among the fathers of the European Union, he was one of the authors of the Spaak Report, calling for the establishment of the European Economic Community. He was vice-chair of the German delegation, led by Alfred Mueller Armack at the 1956 Brussels Conference which led to the Treaty of Rome and was chair of the "Common Market" committee. He is responsible for the fact that the EEC received a contractually specified free market framework and found a kindred spirit in the French delegation leader, Robert Marjolin.

When the Treaty of Rome came into effect on 1 January 1958, Chancellor Konrad Adenauer appointed Von der Groeben as the second German member of the first European Commission, along with Walter Hallstein who became the commission president.

Responsible for competition policy, Von der Groeben set the foundations of the European antitrust rights, introduced the value-added tax system, and adjusted the control systems and the European joint patents. The December 1961 adoption of the European antitrust rights is based on his efforts to unite the French and German systems.

He remained a member of the second Hallstein Commission and the Rey Commission, serving until 1970. After leaving the commission in 1970 he became an advisor to the CDU on questions of European policy and worked actively as a scientist and journalist.

In 1967 he received an Honorary Doctorate from the University of Frankfurt.

He married Gunhild von Rosenberg in 1934 and they had 3 children. After they divorced he married Ilse Freiin von und zu Gilsa in 1974.

Von der Groeben died in 2005, aged 97, in Rheinbach near Bonn.

Political offices
New office	German European Commissioner; 1958–1970; Served alongside: Walter Hallstein, Wilhelm Haferkamp, Fritz Hellwig	Succeeded by Ralf Dahrendorf
New office	German European Commissioner; 1958–1970; Served alongside: Walter Hallstein, Wilhelm Haferkamp, Fritz Hellwig	Succeeded by Wilhelm Haferkamp
New office	European Commissioner for Competition; 1958–1967	Succeeded by Maan Sassen
Preceded by Guido Colonna di Paliano as European Commissioner for Internal Market	European Commissioner for Internal Market and Regional Policy; 1967–1970	Succeeded by Wilhelm Haferkamp as European Commissioner for Internal Market and Energy
Preceded by Guido Colonna di Paliano as European Commissioner for Internal Market	European Commissioner for Internal Market and Regional Policy; 1967–1970	Succeeded by Albert Borschette as European Commissioner for Competition and Regional Policy
