= Danuta Hübner =

Polish economist and politician (born 1948)

Danuta Hübner MEP
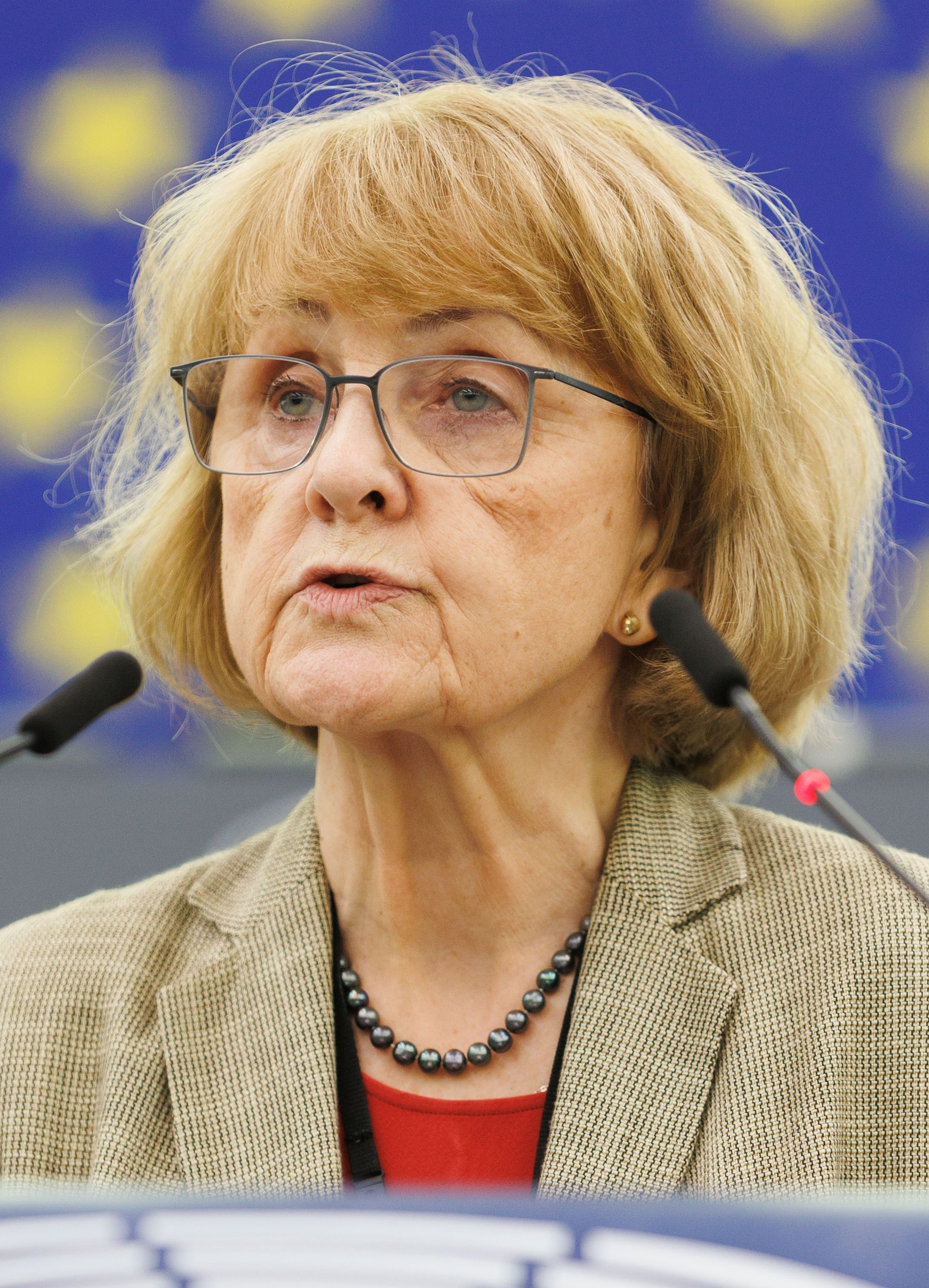
- Hübner in 2022

Chair of the European Parliament Constitutional Affairs Committee
- In office 7 July 2014 – 16 July 2024
- Preceded by: Carlo Casini

Member of the European Parliament
- In office 7 June 2009 – 16 July 2024
- Constituency: Poland

European Commissioner for Regional Policy
- In office 22 November 2004 – 4 July 2009
- President: José Manuel Barroso
- Preceded by: Jacques Barrot
- Succeeded by: Paweł Samecki

European Commissioner for Trade
- In office 1 May 2004 – 22 November 2004; Served with Pascal Lamy
- President: Romano Prodi
- Preceded by: Pascal Lamy
- Succeeded by: Peter Mandelson

Personal details
- Born: Danuta Maria Młynarska; 8 April 1948 (age 78) Nisko, Poland
- Party: Civic Platform (since 2009); Polish United Workers' Party (1970-1987)
- Other political affiliations: Poland: Civic Coalition (since 2018); EU: European People's Party (since 2009); Party of European Socialists (2004-2009)
- Education: Warsaw School of Economics

Danuta Maria Hübner (née Młynarska, Polish: [daˈnuta ˈxʲybnɛr] or [ˈxʲibnɛr]; born 8 April 1948) is a Polish politician, diplomat, and economist and Member of the European Parliament. She was European Commissioner for Regional Policy from 22 November 2004 until 4 July 2009, when she resigned to become a Member of European Parliament for the Civic Platform. In 2012 Hübner became a member of the International Honorary Council of the European Academy of Diplomacy.

== Education ==
Hübner received her MSc in Economics, SGH Warsaw School of Economics (Central School of Planning and Statistics) in 1971, her PhD in economics, SGH Warsaw School of Economics 1974 Visiting scholar at the Centre for European Studies at the University of Sussex in 1974, and her post-doctoral degree in international trade relations, SGH Warsaw School of Economics in 1980.

Hübner was a 1988–1990 Fulbright scholar at the University of California, Berkeley and received an honorary Degree in Laws of Sussex University in 2005.

== Academics ==
In the 1970s Hübner was a visiting scholar at Universidad Autonoma in Madrid. Since 1971 she has been a professor at the Warsaw School of Economics.

For 1981–1987 she was Deputy Director of the Research Institute for Developing Countries, Warsaw School of Economics. She has been a full Professor, Warsaw School of Economics, since 1992, currently on leave. For 1991–1994 she was Deputy Director, Institute for Development and Strategic Studies, Warsaw.

== Publishing ==
For 1991–1997 Deputy Editor-in-Chief of the Ekonomista, a Polish bi-monthly, and for 1994–1997 she was Editor-in-Chief of Gospodarka Narodowa, a Polish economics monthly.

== Political career ==
=== Early beginnings ===
- 1997–1998 Minister Head of the Chancellery of the President of the Republic of Poland Aleksander Kwaśniewski
- 1996–1997 Government Plenipotentiary for establishing the Committee for European Integration (KIE), Secretary of KIE with the rank of Secretary of State and Head of the Office of the Committee for European Integration (UKIE)
- 1995–1996 Chief Negotiator for accession to OECD
- 1994–1996 Under-Secretary of State in the Ministry of Industry and Trade
- 1994–1995 Advisor to the Deputy Prime Minister and Minister of Finance, Co-author of the Government Programme Strategy for Poland
- 1992–1996 Chairperson of the Council for Social Planning, Central Office for Planning
- In the years 1970–1987 she was a member of communist Polish United Workers' Party PZPR

=== United Nations Economic Commission for Europe, 1998–2001 ===
- 2000–2001 United Nations Under Secretary General and Executive Secretary, United Nations Economic Commission for Europe, Geneva
- 1998–2001 Economic Advisor to the President of the Republic of Poland Aleksander Kwaśniewski
- 1998–2000 Deputy Executive Secretary, United Nations Economic Commission for Europe, Geneva

=== Return to government ===
From 2001 until 2003, Hübner was the Head of Office of the Committee for European Integration and Secretary of State at the Ministry of Foreign Affairs.

From 2003 until 2004, Hübner served as Minister for European Affairs in the government of Prime Minister Leszek Miller. In this capacity, she was the representative of the Government of Poland to the Convention on the Future of Europe.

=== Member of the European Commission, 2004–2009 ===
From 1 May 2004, Hübner was a Member of the European Commission. At the time of her nomination by Prime Minister of Poland Leszek Miller, her main competitor was fellow Convention member and former Prime Minister Józef Oleksy.

In November 2004, Hübner was appointed Commissioner for Regional Policy in the European Commission led by President José Manuel Barroso. In this capacity, she represented the Commission at the funeral of Pope John Paul II in 2005.

Between 2006 and 2007, Hübner served as member of the Amato Group, a group of high-level European politicians unofficially working on rewriting the Treaty establishing a Constitution for Europe into what became known as the Treaty of Lisbon following its rejection by French and Dutch voters.

=== Member of the European Parliament, 2009–present ===
Since the 2009 European elections, Hübner has been a Member of the European Parliament for Poland, representing the Warsaw Constituency (from Civic Platform). In 2011, she was awarded the Emperor-Maximilian-Prize.

From 2009 until 2014, Hübner served as chairwoman of the Committee on Regional Development. Since 2014, she has been chairing the Committee on Constitutional Affairs. She also serves on the Committee on Economic and Monetary Affairs and on the five-member Advisory Committee on the Conduct of Members, the parliament’s body responsible for assessing alleged breaches of its code of conduct and advising the President of the European Parliament on possible action to be taken,

In addition to her committee assignments, Hübner has been a member of the Parliament's delegation for relations with the United States since 2009. On 15 September 2010 she joined the Spinelli Group in the European Parliament, which was founded to reinvigorate the strive for federalisation of the EU; other prominent supporters included Jacques Delors, Daniel Cohn-Bendit, Guy Verhofstadt, Andrew Duff, Elmar Brok. She is also a member of the European Parliament Intergroup on Sports. From 2014 until 2019, she was a member of the European Parliament's Advisory Committee on the Conduct of Members.

In 2015, Hübner was one of the Parliament's two rapporteurs (alongside Jo Leinen) on a set of proposed changes to EU electoral law that sought to regularize a variety of different electoral systems across the EU. Since 2017, she has been serving on the Parliament's so-called Brexit Steering Group, which works under the aegis of the Conference of Presidents and to coordinates Parliament's deliberations, considerations and resolutions on the UK's withdrawal from the EU.

== Other activities ==
- Centre for European Policy Studies (CEPS), Member of the Board of Directors
- European Council on Foreign Relations (ECFR), Member
- European Policy Centre (EPC), Member of the Strategic Council
- New Pact for Europe, Member of the Advisory Group
- Policy Network, Member of the Board of Directors
- Polish Academy of Sciences, Member of the Scientific Board of Economic Sciences Institute (1996–1998)
- European Association of Development Research and Training Institutes (EADI), Member of the Executive Committee (1987–1996)
- National Statistics Council of Poland, Member (1995–1997)
- Member of the Programme Council of Nowe Życie Gospodarcze, Polish economic bi-weekly magazine
- European Business Academy for Enterprises Warsaw, Member of the Programme Council
- Management Institute Warsaw, President of the Programme Board
- Member of the Scientific Council of the State Veterinary Institute in Puławy
- Member of the Scientific Council of the Central Mining Institute, Katowice
- Member of the Programme Board of the Polish Institute of Oncology, Warsaw
- Member of the association for counteracting social exclusion of persons suffering from psychiatric disorders MOST, Bydgoszcz
- Honorary member of Soroptimist International Poland – Dom Polski Association, Warsaw

== Political positions ==
In November 2017, Hübner joined a parliamentary majority by voting in favor of a resolution invoking Article 7 of the Treaty on European Union, thereby potentially stripping Poland of voting rights in the EU for violating the common values of the bloc, including the rule of law. Shortly after, her political opponents had pictures of Hübner and five other Polish politicians strung from a makeshift gallows in a public square in Katowice.

Speaking in July 2017 with respect to Brexit negotiations, Hübner has said the process cannot be about "cherry-picking". She has said that it is "important to understand what the UK wants". She has said that they have heard the UK say "no customs union, no single market". She has said that she hopes the negotiation will be a "learning process" for the UK and that these stances will change. Hübner said she was "totally disappointed" with the Brexit decision and said that she felt there was a "lack of understanding of the consequences" of Brexit.

Political offices
New office	Polish European Commissioner; 2004–2009	Succeeded by Paweł Samecki
Preceded by Pascal Lamy	European Commissioner for Trade; 2004; Served alongside: Pascal Lamy	Succeeded by Peter Mandelson
Preceded by Jacques Barrot	European Commissioner for Regional Policy; 2004–2009	Succeeded by Paweł Samecki
