= Lionello Levi Sandri =

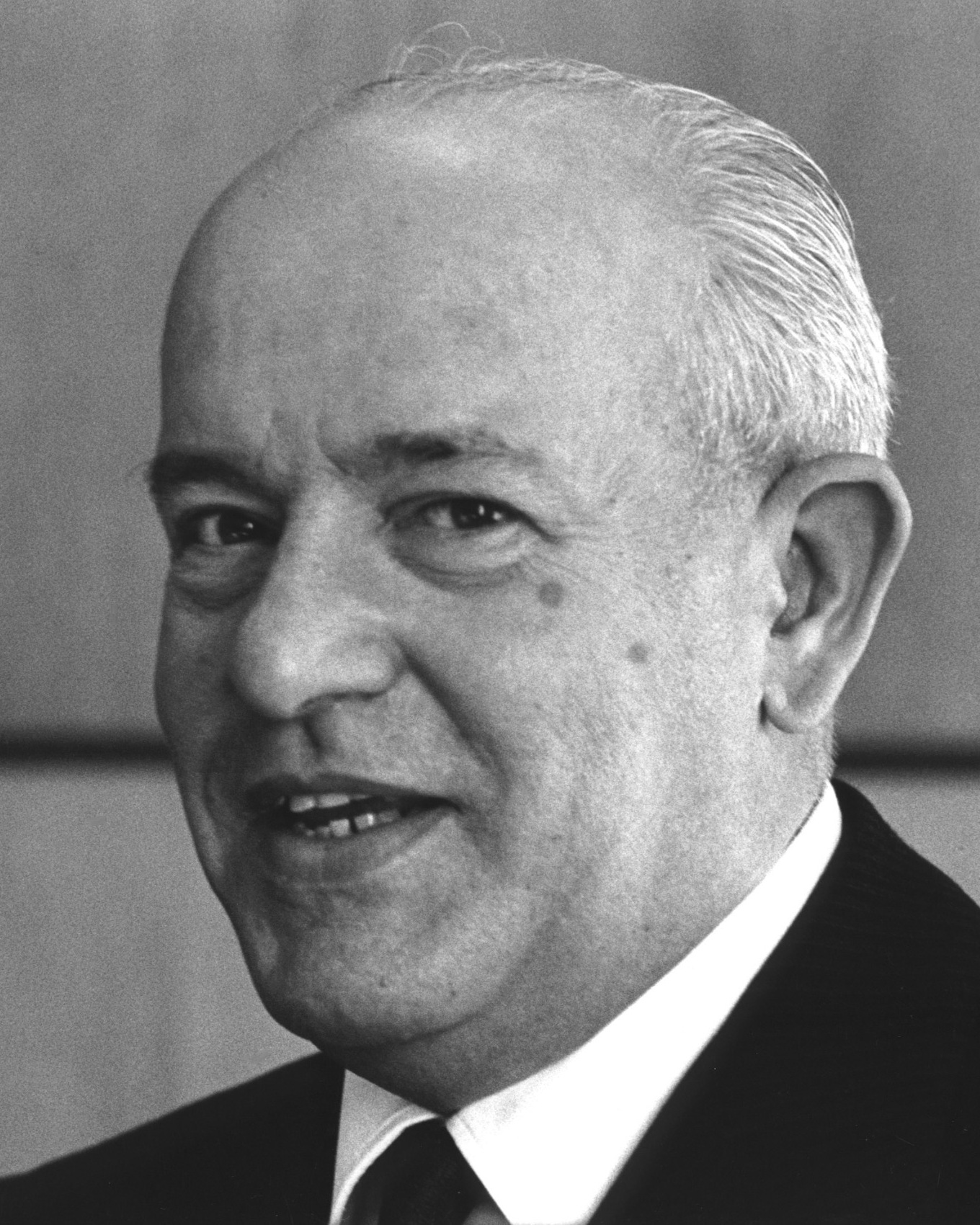

European Commissioner for Social Affairs, Personnel and Administration
- In office 2 July 1967 – 30 June 1970
- President: Jean Rey
- Preceded by: Himself (Social Affairs)
- Succeeded by: Albert Coppé (Social Affairs, Transport and Budget)

European Commissioner for Social Affairs
- In office 8 February 1961 – 2 July 1967
- President: Walter Hallstein
- Preceded by: Giuseppe Petrilli
- Succeeded by: Himself (Social Affairs, Personnel and Administration)

Personal details
- Born: 5 October 1910 Milan, Italy
- Died: 14 April 1991 (aged 80) Rome, Italy
- Party: Socialist Party

Lionello Levi Sandri (5 October 1910 in Milan – 14 April 1991 in Rome) was an Italian politician and European Commissioner.

Upon completing his education in 1932, Levi Sandri entered a career as a civil servant in the Italian employment administration and was promoted to high-ranking posts at a young age. In 1940, he became a lecturer in industrial law at the University of Rome. In the same year, he served in North Africa in the Second World War. Following the armistice on 8 September 1943 and the related events, however, he chose to join the resistance movement against Benito Mussolini, where he came to lead the partisan formation "Fiamme Verdi" (Green Flames) in the Brescia region.

After the war, Levi Sandri became involved in the Italian Socialist Party (PSI). From 1946 to 1950, he was a member of the town council for Brescia. From 1948, he was a member of the party executive committee at a regional level. Moreover, he was the chief of staff in the Italian Ministry for Employment.

He later advocated the formation of the Party of European Socialists.

He was appointed to the first European Commission in December 1960 (or February 1961) as the successor to Giuseppe Petrilli in the Hallstein Commission and was responsible for the Social Affairs portfolio, in addition to overseas states and territories. He supported the equalisation of work and social rights between the EEC states. He continued as a member of the second Hallstein Commission (1962–1967), where he was a vice-president from 1964, and as a member of the Rey Commission from 1967 to 1970.

Political offices
Preceded by Giuseppe Petrilli	Italian European Commissioner; 1961–1970; Served alongside: Giuseppe Caron, Guido Colonna di Paliano, Edoardo Martino	Succeeded by Franco Maria Malfatti
Preceded by Giuseppe Petrilli	Italian European Commissioner; 1961–1970; Served alongside: Giuseppe Caron, Guido Colonna di Paliano, Edoardo Martino	Succeeded by Altiero Spinelli
Preceded by Giuseppe Petrilli	European Commissioner for Social Affairs; 1961–1967	Succeeded by Himself as European Commissioner for Social Affairs, Personnel and Administration
Preceded by Himself as European Commissioner for Social Affairs	European Commissioner for Social Affairs, Personnel and Administration; 1967–1970	Succeeded by Albert Coppé as European Commissioner for Social Affairs, Transport and Budget
