= Paweł Samecki =

Polish economist

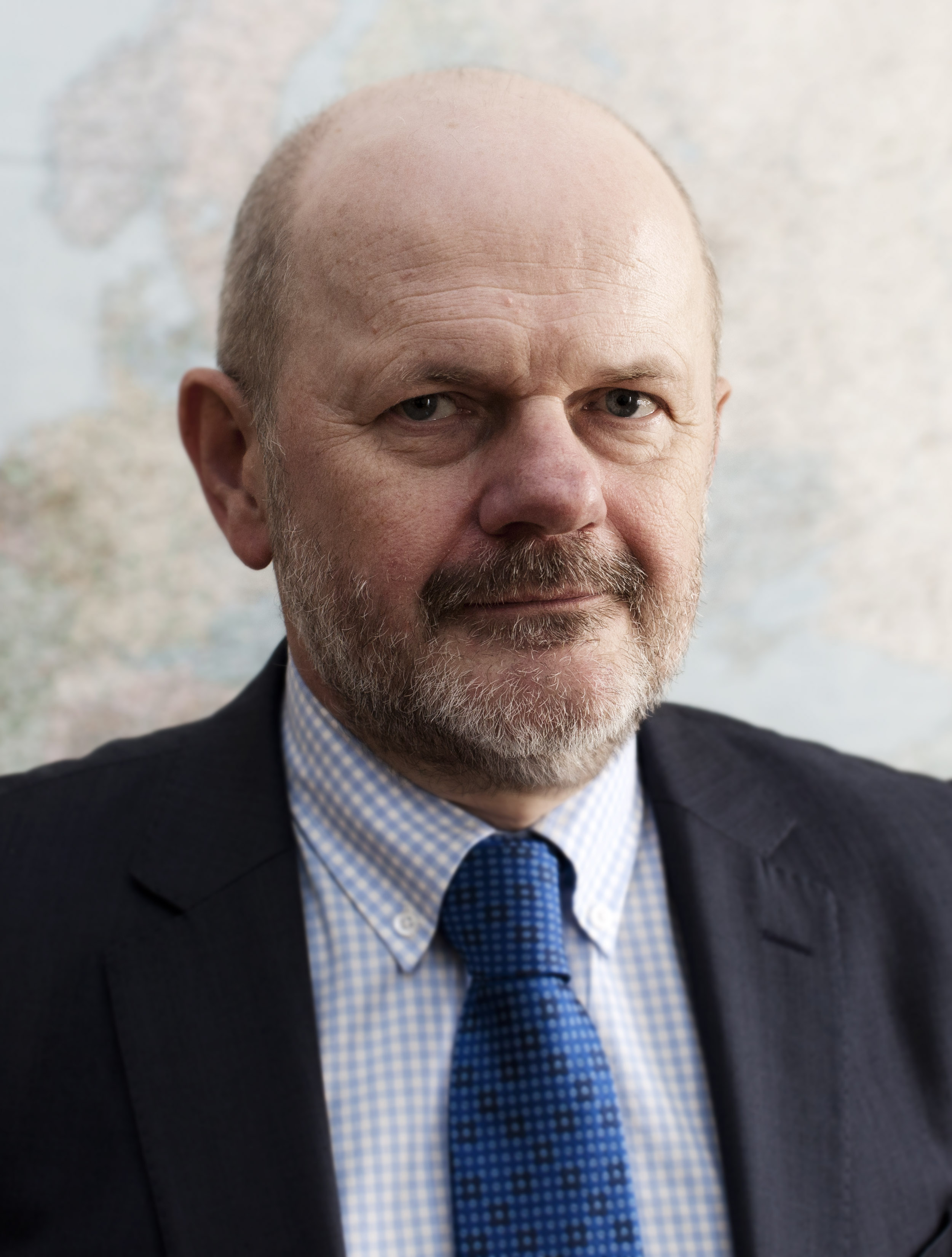
- Samecki in 2014

European Commissioner for Regional Policy
- In office 4 July 2009 – 9 February 2010
- President: José Manuel Barroso
- Preceded by: Danuta Hübner
- Succeeded by: Johannes Hahn

Personal details
- Born: 12 March 1958 (age 68) Łódź, Poland
- Education: University of Łódź
- Profession: Economist

Paweł Samecki (born 12 March 1958) is a Polish economist and served as the European Commissioner for Regional Policy (2009–10). He is married and has two children.

Political offices
Preceded by Danuta Hübner	Polish European Commissioner; 2009–2010	Succeeded by Janusz Lewandowski
Preceded by Danuta Hübner	European Commissioner for Regional Policy; 2009–2010	Succeeded by Johannes Hahn
