= Johannes Lebech =

Danish politician

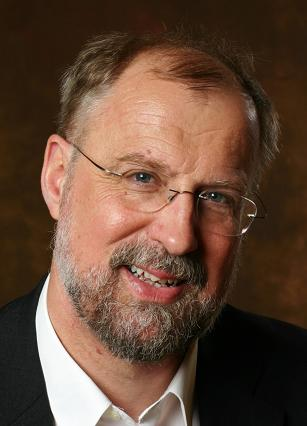

Minister of Ecclesiastical Affairs
- In office 21 December 2000 – 27 November 2001
- Prime Minister: Poul Nyrup Rasmussen
- Preceded by: Margrethe Vestager
- Succeeded by: Tove Fergo

Personal details
- Born: 12 September 1948 (age 78) Skive, Denmark
- Party: Danish Social Liberal Party
- Education: Aarhus Universitet
- Website: johanneslebech.dk

Niels Johannes Lebech (born 12 September 1948) is a Danish politician. He is former Minister for Ecclesiastical Affairs for the Danish Social Liberal Party and a former member of the European Parliament.

== Biography ==
Johannes Lebech is the son of principal Kristen Lebech and Edith Lebech (born Nielsen). After graduating high school at Viborg Katedralskole in 1967, Lebech served as a section leader in the Danish Civil defense (now called Danish Emergency Management Agency) from 1967 to 1969.

Lebech studied Danish and History at Aarhus Universitet 1969-1975 and European Studies at Jysk Åbent Universitet 1994–1996. He was a teaching assistant while studying at Aarhus Universitet and teacher at Holstebro Handelsskole from 1975 to 1978. Lebech was teacher and Lector at Holstebro Gymnasium og HF from 1978 to 2013.

== Political career ==
Johannes Lebech became a member of the Danish Social Liberal Party in 1980 and held various offices in the party: He served as chairman of the constituency of Holstebro 1982–1985, secretary for the county from 1985 to 1992 and party chairman from 1997 to 2000.

Lebech was Minister of Ecclesiastical Affairs from 21 December 2000 to 27 November 2001 in the Cabinet of Poul Nyrup Rasmussen IV, succeeding his party colleague Margrethe Vestager.

Lebech was a member of the European Parliament from 29 November 2007 to 13 July 2009.

Political offices
Preceded by Margrethe Vestager	Minister of Ecclesiastical Affairs; 21 December 2000 – 27 November 2001	Succeeded by Tove Fergo
Party political offices
Preceded by Margrethe Vestager	Chairman of the Danish Social Liberal Party; 1997–2000	Succeeded by Lone Loklindt (acting)
