= Ulla Tørnæs =

Danish politician (born 1962)

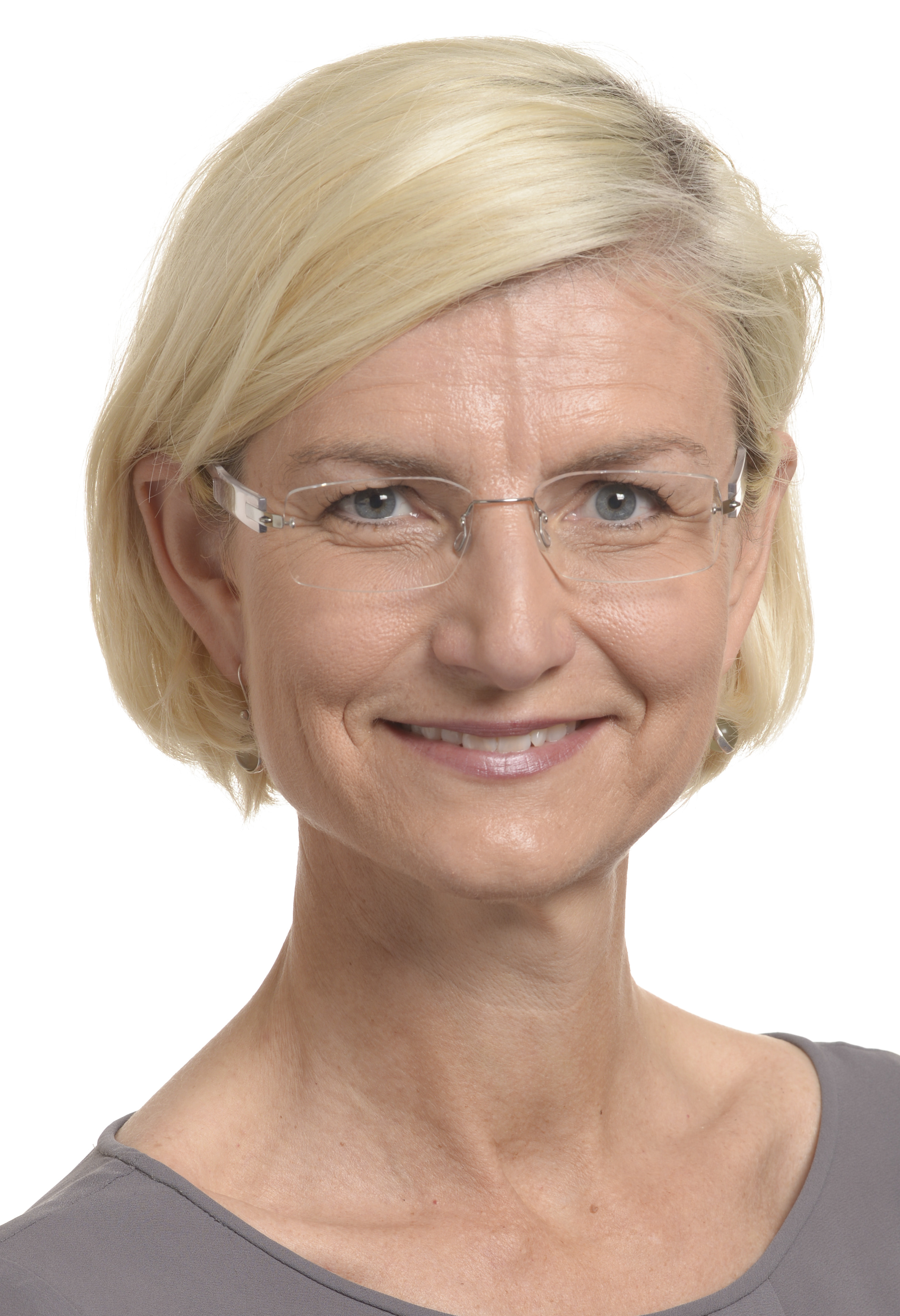

Minister of higher education and science
- In office 29 February 2016 – 28 November 2016
- Preceded by: Esben Lunde Larsen
- Succeeded by: Søren Pind

Minister for development cooperation
- In office 28 November 2016 – 27 June 2019
- Preceded by: Peter Christensen
- Succeeded by: Rasmus Prehn
- In office 18 February 2005 – 23 February 2010

Minister of education
- In office 27 November 2001 – 18 February 2005
- Preceded by: Margrethe Vestager
- Succeeded by: Bertel Haarder

Member of the Folketing
- Incumbent
- Assumed office 5 June 2019
- Constituency: South Jutland
- In office 21 September 1994 – 30 June 2014
- Constituency: South Jutland (2007–2014); Ribe (1994–2007)

Member of the European Parliament
- In office 2014–2016
- Constituency: Denmark

Personal details
- Born: Ulla Tørnæs; 4 September 1962 (age 64) Esbjerg, Denmark
- Party: Venstre; Alliance of Liberals and Democrats for Europe
- Education: Odense University; University of Savoy; Copenhagen Business School

Ulla Pedersen Tørnæs (born 4 September 1962 in Esbjerg) is a Danish politician, who is a member of the Folketing for the Liberal Party. She previously sat in parliament from 1994 to 2014, and served as member of the European Parliament from 2014 to 2016. She served as minister for development cooperation from 2016 to 2019, minister of higher education and science in 2016, minister of development cooperation from 2005 to 2010 and minister of education from 2001 to 2005.

== Political career ==
=== Role in Danish politics ===
Tørnæs served as minister for education in the Cabinet of Anders Fogh Rasmussen I (2001–2005) and as minister for development cooperation in the Cabinet of Anders Fogh Rasmussen II from 18 February 2005. From 2007, she was a member of the World Bank Group’s High Level Advisory Council on Women's Economic Empowerment, which was chaired by Danny Leipziger and Heidemarie Wieczorek-Zeul. She was also a member of the Prime Minister's Commission on Effective Development Cooperation with Africa which held meetings between April and October 2008. From 2010 until 2016, Tørnæs was a member of the management committee of the Danish Liberal Democracy Programme (DLDP).

=== Member of the European Parliament, 2014–2016 ===
Tørnæs became a Member of the European Parliament following the 2014 European elections. A member of the ALDE (Group of the Alliance of Liberals and Democrats for Europe) political faction, she served as vice-chairwoman of the Committee on Employment and Social Affairs. In 2015, she was the lead negotiator for the ALDE group on the eCall system. In addition to her committee assignments, Tørnæs was a member of the parliament's delegation for relations with the countries of Southeast Asia and the Association of Southeast Asian Nations (ASEAN).

=== Return to Danish politics ===
Tørnæs left the European Parliament on 29 February 2016, becoming minister for science, technology, information and higher education in the Lars Løkke Rasmussen II Cabinet, where she proposed the education ceiling. Her successor is Morten Løkkegaard. From 28 November 2016 until 2019, Tørnæs again served as minister for development cooperation.

== Personal life ==
Tørnæs is the daughter of former minister Laurits Tørnæs and Katty Tørnæs.

Political offices
Preceded by Mogens Jensen	Minister for development cooperation 2016 - 2019	Succeeded by Rasmus Prehn
Preceded by Esben Lunde Larsen	Minister of higher education and science 2016 - 2016	Succeeded by Søren Pind
Preceded by Bertel Haarder	Minister for development cooperation 2005 - 2010	Succeeded by Søren Pind
Preceded by Margrethe Vestager	Minister of education 2001 - 2005	Succeeded by Bertel Haarder
