= Maan Sassen =

Dutch politician (1911–1995)

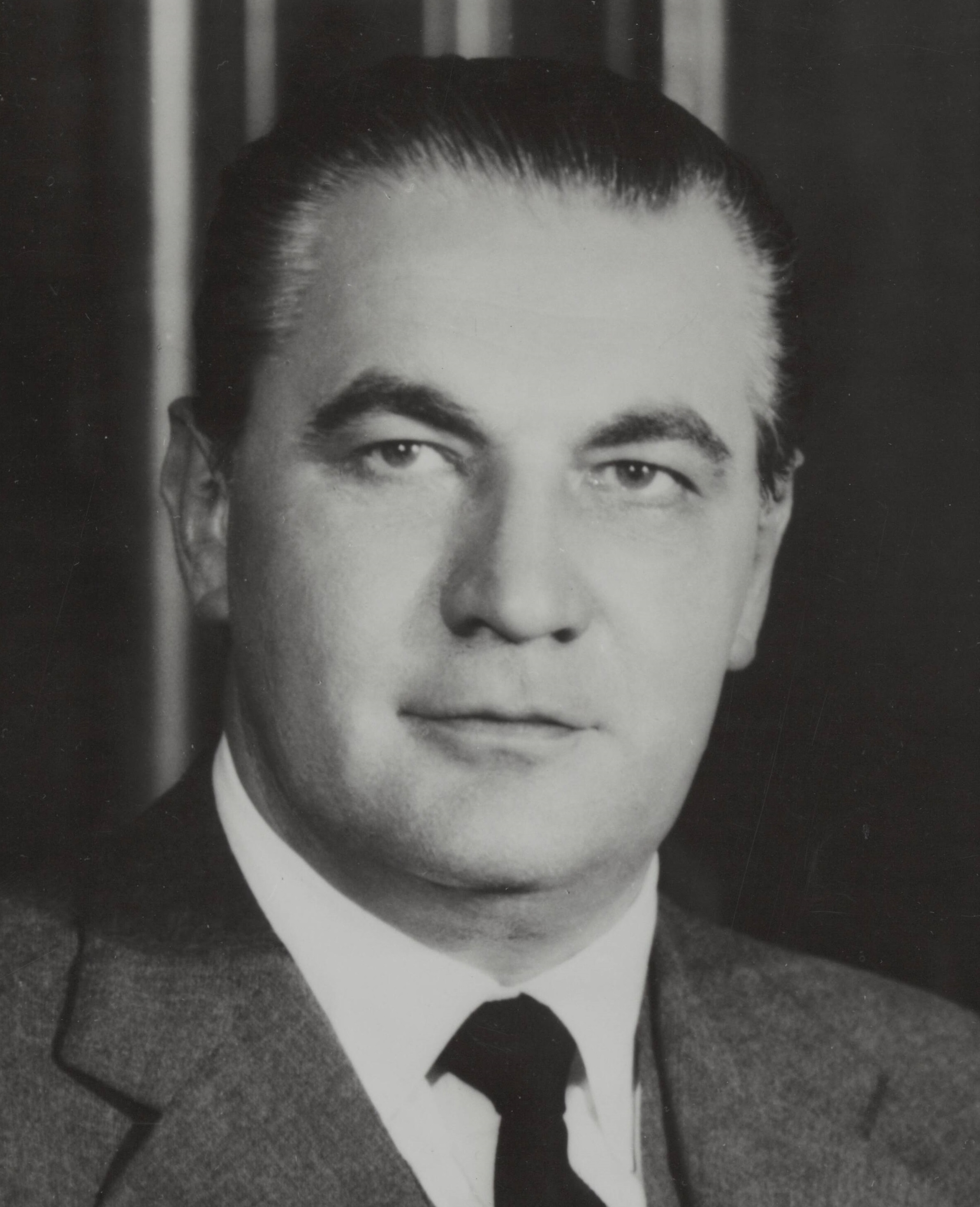
- Sassen in 1948

European Commissioner for Competition
- In office 30 June 1967 – 30 June 1970
- President: Jean Rey
- Preceded by: Hans von der Groeben
- Succeeded by: Albert Borschette

Member of the European Parliament
- In office 1 January 1958 – 13 February 1958
- Parliamentary group: Christian Democratic Group

Member of the European Coal and Steel Community Parliament
- In office 10 September 1952 – 1 January 1958
- Parliamentary group: Christian Democratic Group

Member of the Senate
- In office 13 November 1956 – 4 February 1958
- In office 15 July 1952 – 6 November 1956

Minister of Overseas Territories
- In office 7 August 1948 – 14 February 1949
- Prime Minister: Willem Drees
- Preceded by: Jan Jonkman
- Succeeded by: Johan van Maarseveen

Member of the House of Representatives
- In office 4 June 1946 – 7 August 1948

Personal details
- Born: Emmanuel Marie Joseph Antony Sassen; 11 September 1911 's-Hertogenbosch, Netherlands
- Died: 20 December 1995 (aged 84) 's-Hertogenbosch, Netherlands
- Party: Catholic People's Party (1945–1980)
- Other political affiliations: Roman Catholic State Party (1938–1945)

Emmanuel Marie Joseph Antony "Maan" Sassen (11 September 1911 – 20 December 1995) was a Dutch politician who served as European Commissioner for Competition in the Rey Commission from 1967 to 1971.

== Career ==
Sassen studied law and earned a doctorate. From 1936 to 1950 he worked as a lawyer and district attorney. In 1939 he became a member of the States of North Brabant. During World War Two he was interned at Kamp Sint-Michielsgestel. In 1946 he was elected to the Dutch House of Representatives for the Katholieke Volkspartij (KVP). He served as Minister responsible for the Dutch Colonies (1948–1949) and as European Commissioner for Competition in the Rey Commission from 1967 to 1971.

He was a member of the Common Assembly of the European Coal and Steel Community from its establishment in 1952 and was the first President of the Christian Democratic group, the predecessor of the European People's Party Group.

Political offices
Preceded by Sicco Mansholt	Dutch European Commissioner; 1967–1971; Served alongside: Sicco Mansholt	Succeeded by Sicco Mansholt
Preceded by Hans von der Groeben	European Commissioner for Competition; 1967–1971	Succeeded by Albert Borschette
