= Danish educational ceiling =

Repealed Danish rule limiting access to multiple higher educations

The Danish educational ceiling (Danish: uddannelsesloft(et)) is a repealed Danish rule limiting access to multiple higher educations in order to avoid double education.

The rule called for restricting persons from accessing full-time, state-funded higher education if those persons had already completed a state-funded higher education on a similar or lower level, though some exceptions were made for enrollment into educations with particularly low unemployment rates after graduation.

== Background ==
The law which implemented the rule was proposed on November 9, 2016, by Minister of Higher Education and Science Ulla Tørnæs. The law was at the time of proposal estimated to free up DKK 342.3 million in the national budget, which was to be directed towards unemployment benefits instead.

The proposal was passed in the Folketing on December 19, 2016, with 79 votes for (from parties V, S, DF, LA, KF) and 24 against (from the mainly left-wing parties EL, SF, RV and Å).

The rule drew intense criticism from students, educational institutions, worker's unions and corporations.

== Amendment ==
The rule was amended the following month of January 2017. The amendment relaxed the heavy restrictions on educational reenrollments, replacing the life-time restriction of education graduates from pursuing further state-funded education with a required six-year waiting period between the graduation from one education and the subsequent enrollment into another. Specifically, after a six-year waiting period:

- vocational university ('erhvervsakademi') graduates would again be allowed to attend vocational university.
- persons with educations falling into the categories 'Professionsbachelor' or 'akademiske bachelorer' as well as other persons with a higher education of category 'medium-length' would again be allowed to enter a second educational program of similar kind.
- persons with masters degrees would be allowed to enroll in a vocational-university education or a second bachelor's or master's degree

Additionally, no six-year waiting period was required if:

- medical conditions prevented persons from using a previously completed education on the labor market
- a person's previous education has become obsolete, i.e. the education has radically changed or seized to be offered
- the education was on a list of educations with a negligible unemployment rate (a list called 'positivlisten' or 'the positive list').

On January 26, 2018, a citizens' proposition to abolish the ceiling was put forth. The proposition was rejected by Parliament, but increased focus on the issue. This was the first citizens' proposition having collected enough signees to be discussed in parliament.

== Abolition ==
Having received continuous criticism from students, educational institutions, multiple political parties and more, the rule was repealed on December 2, 2019, as part of the newly elected government's negotiations on the national budget. The repeal is scheduled to take effect as of January 1, 2020.
