= Giuseppe Petrilli =

Italian professor and European Commissioner

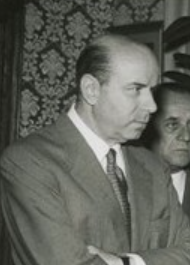
- Petrilli in 1969

European Commissioner for Social Affairs
- In office 7 January 1958 – 8 February 1961
- President: Walter Hallstein
- Preceded by: Position established
- Succeeded by: Lionello Levi Sandri

Personal details
- Born: 13 March 1913 Naples, Italy
- Died: 13 May 1999 (aged 86) Rome, Italy
- Party: Christian Democracy

Giuseppe Petrilli (13 March 1913 – 13 May 1999) was an Italian professor and European Commissioner.

He was a non-politician appointed as the first Italian European Commissioner on the Hallstein Commission from January 1958 with responsibility for the Social Affairs portfolio. In September 1960 (or December 1960, or 8 February 1961) he resigned and was succeeded by Lionello Levi Sandri.

A professor, Giuseppe Petrilli became president of IRI (the Italian Institute for Industrial Reconstruction – a powerful state-owned holding company) in 1960 and served for almost twenty years, until 1979. He died on 13 May 1999, aged 86.

Commissioner Petrilli was a member of the 1979 group that produced the Spierenburg Report on the improvement of the working methods of the commission.

A Giuseppe Petrilli, left-wing Italian Christian Democrat (DC) member was appointed secretary general of the "EUCD" in 1978, according to the European Peoples Party.

A Giuseppe Petrelli became a member of the 8th Italian Senate after the 1979 elections.

Political offices
New office	Italian European Commissioner; 1958–1961; Served alongside: Piero Malvestiti	Succeeded by Lionello Levi Sandri
New office	European Commissioner for Social Affairs; 1958–1961	Succeeded by Lionello Levi Sandri
