= Michele Cianciulli =

Italian lawyer, historian, and philosopher

Michele Cianciulli (1895–1965) was an Italian lawyer, historian, and philosopher.

Cianciulli, born in Montella, was charged with the teaching of philosophy at the University La Sapienza in Rome.

He has written books in history and philosophy. The most well-known are the works on King Manfred of Sicily and on Brigantaggio.

Known for his moral integrity he executed the last wills for several important inheritances and was a known anti-fascist in the period 1922-1945.

He was the administrator responsible for the Grande Oriente di Italia in the 1950-1955. He was friends with and exchanged letters with the composer Nino Rota. He died in Rome in 1965.

== Works ==
- Mazzini e il Romanticismo
- Il brigantaggio nell'Italia meridionale dal 1860 al 1870
- Re Manfredi e la tradizione della sua tomba in Montevergine
- Gentile - Tillinger: etica
- L'opera filosofica di F. Masci, in Idealismo realistico (1927), nn. 5-6.

=== Rare and unpublished ===
- Colloqui con mio fratello

== Sources ==
- Ciano A., The Savoia and the massacre in southern Italy, Grandmelò, Roma, 1996.
- Michele Cianciulli on Montellanet.com, http://www.montellanet.com/montella/personaggi/personaggi.asp?id=117&title=Michele%20Cianciulli
- https://web.archive.org/web/20080413053511/http://www.montella.eu/Personaggi/Personaggi/Personaggi_Mont-01.htm
