= European Commissioner for Cohesion and Reforms =

Member of the EU Commission

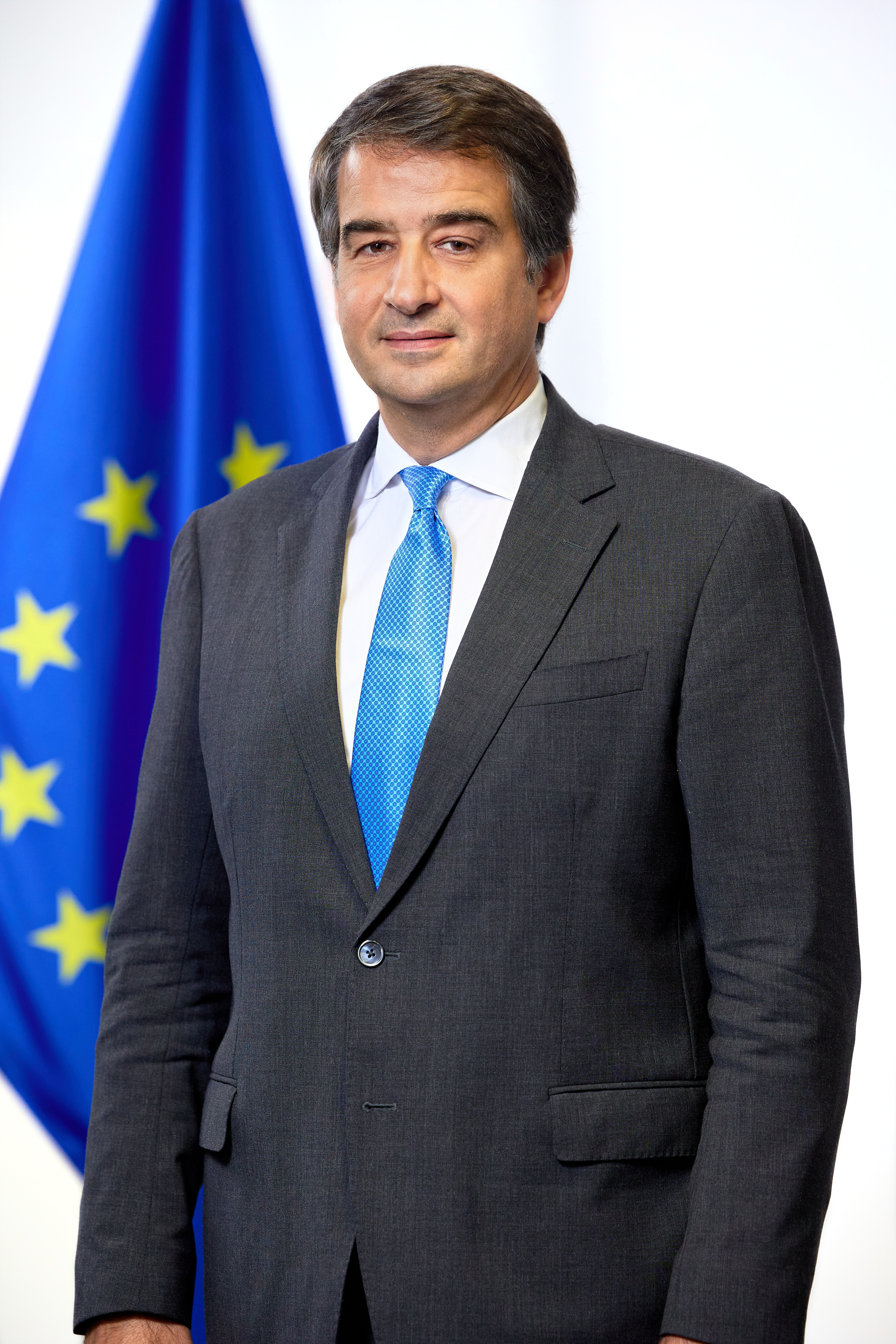
- Incumbent; Raffaele Fitto since 1 December 2024
- Appointer: President of the European Commission
- Term length: 5 years
- Inaugural holder: Hans von der Groeben
- Formation: 1967

The Commissioner for Cohesion and Reforms is a portfolio within the European Commission. The current Commissioner is Raffaele Fitto.

The portfolio is responsible for managing the regional policy of the European Union, such as the European Regional Development Fund, which takes up a third of the EU's budget.

== Current commissioner ==
Commissioner Raffaele Fitto, along with the broader Von der Leyen Commission II, was approved by the European Parliament in 2024.

== List of commissioners ==
#	Name	Country	Period	Commission
1	Hans von der Groeben	Germany	1967–1970	Rey Commission
2	Albert Borschette	Luxembourg	1970–1973	Malfatti Commission, Mansholt Commission
3	George Thomson	United Kingdom	1973–1977	Ortoli Commission
4	Antonio Giolitti	Italy	1977–1985	Jenkins Commission, Thorn Commission
5	Grigoris Varfis	Greece	1985–1989	Delors Commission I
6	Bruce Millan	United Kingdom	1989–1994	Delors Commission II & III
7	Monika Wulf-Mathies	Germany	1994–1999	Santer Commission
8	Michel Barnier	France	1999–2004	Prodi Commission
9	Jacques Barrot	France	2004	Prodi Commission
10	Péter Balázs	Hungary	2004	Prodi Commission
11	Danuta Hübner	Poland	2004–2009	Barroso Commission I
12	Paweł Samecki	Poland	2009–2010	Barroso Commission I
13	Johannes Hahn	Austria	2010–2014	Barroso Commission II
14	Corina Crețu	Romania	2014–2019	Juncker Commission
15	Elisa Ferreira	Portugal	2019–2024	Von der Leyen Commission I
16	Raffaele Fitto	Italy	2024–present	Von der Leyen Commission II

== See also ==
- Directorate-General for Regional Policy
- European Regional Development Fund
- Structural Funds and Cohesion Funds
- Instrument for Structural Policies for Pre-Accession
- European Social Fund
