= Albert Borschette =

Luxembourgish diplomat (1920–1976)

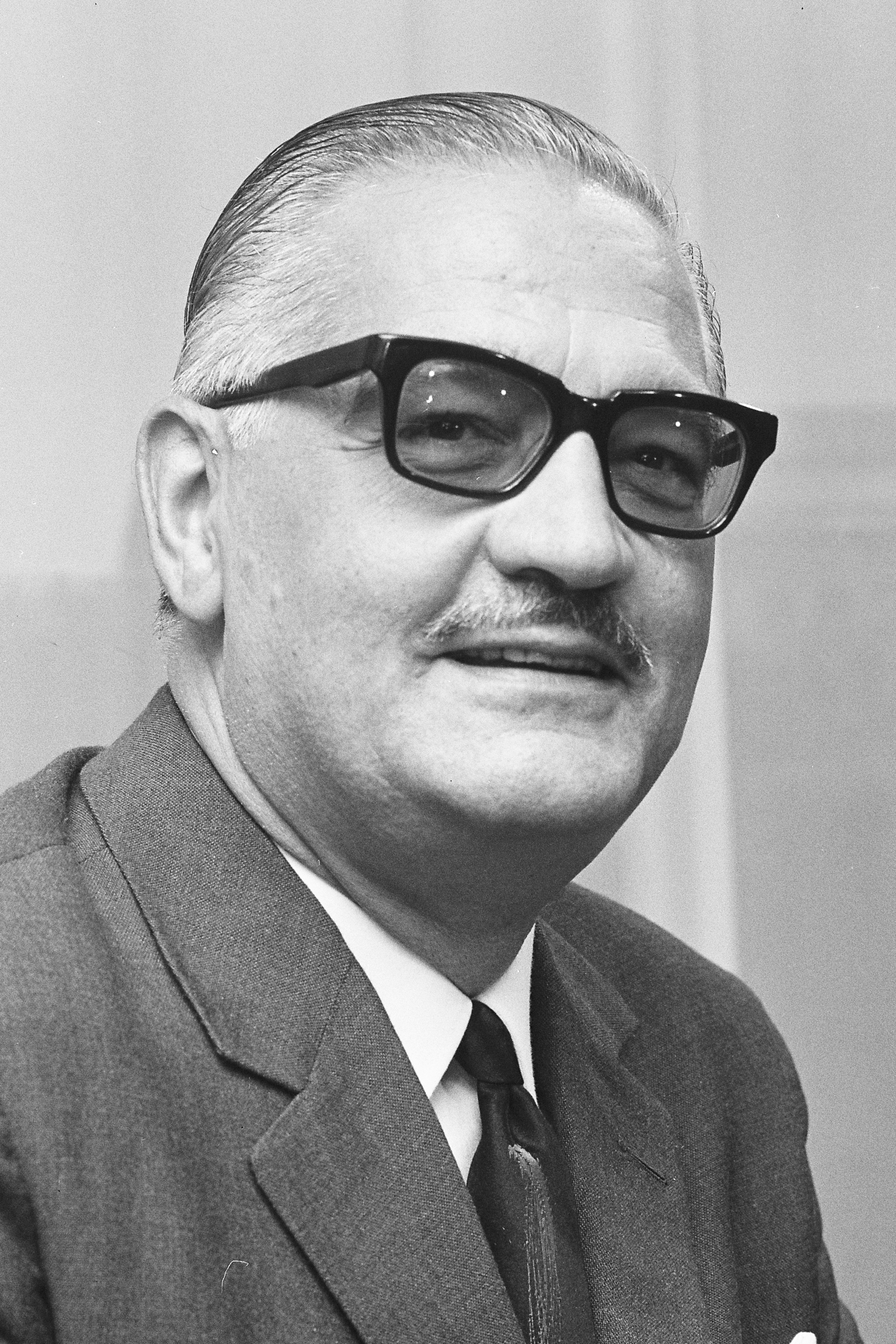
- Borschette in 1970

European Commissioner^{[Portfolios]}
- In office 1 July 1970 – 5 January 1977
- President: Franco Maria Malfatti; Sicco Mansholt; François-Xavier Ortoli
- Preceded by: Maan Sassen
- Succeeded by: Raymond Vouel

Personal details
- Born: 14 June 1920
- Died: 8 December 1976 (aged 56)
- Occupation: Diplomat, writer

Military service
- Allegiance: Nazi Germany; Luxembourg
- Branch/service: Wehrmacht
- Battles/wars: World War II; Eastern Front; Allied occupation of Germany

Albert Borschette (14 June 1920 – 8 December 1976) was a Luxembourgish diplomat and writer. He served as Luxembourg's European Commissioner from 1970 until 1976.

After attending the Lycées of Diekirch and Luxembourg City, Borschette studied in Aix-en-Provence, Innsbruck, Munich and Paris.

In World War II he was forcibly enrolled in the Wehrmacht and fought on the Eastern Front. His experiences there formed the basis for his literary work: almost all of his books involve the Soviet Union or the war. For his novel Continuer à mourir he received the SELF Prize in 1957.

After the war he was a press attaché in the Ministry of State, and then became the Luxembourgish representative with the French occupying army in Germany, with the Allied Control Commission in Berlin, then Embassy Secretary in Berlin and then in Brussels.

His work in and for Europe was aimed at making another war on the continent impossible (one of his books mentions the "génération sacrifiée", or the lost generation). From 1958 to 1970 he was the Permanent Representative of Luxembourg to the European Communities, later the European Union.

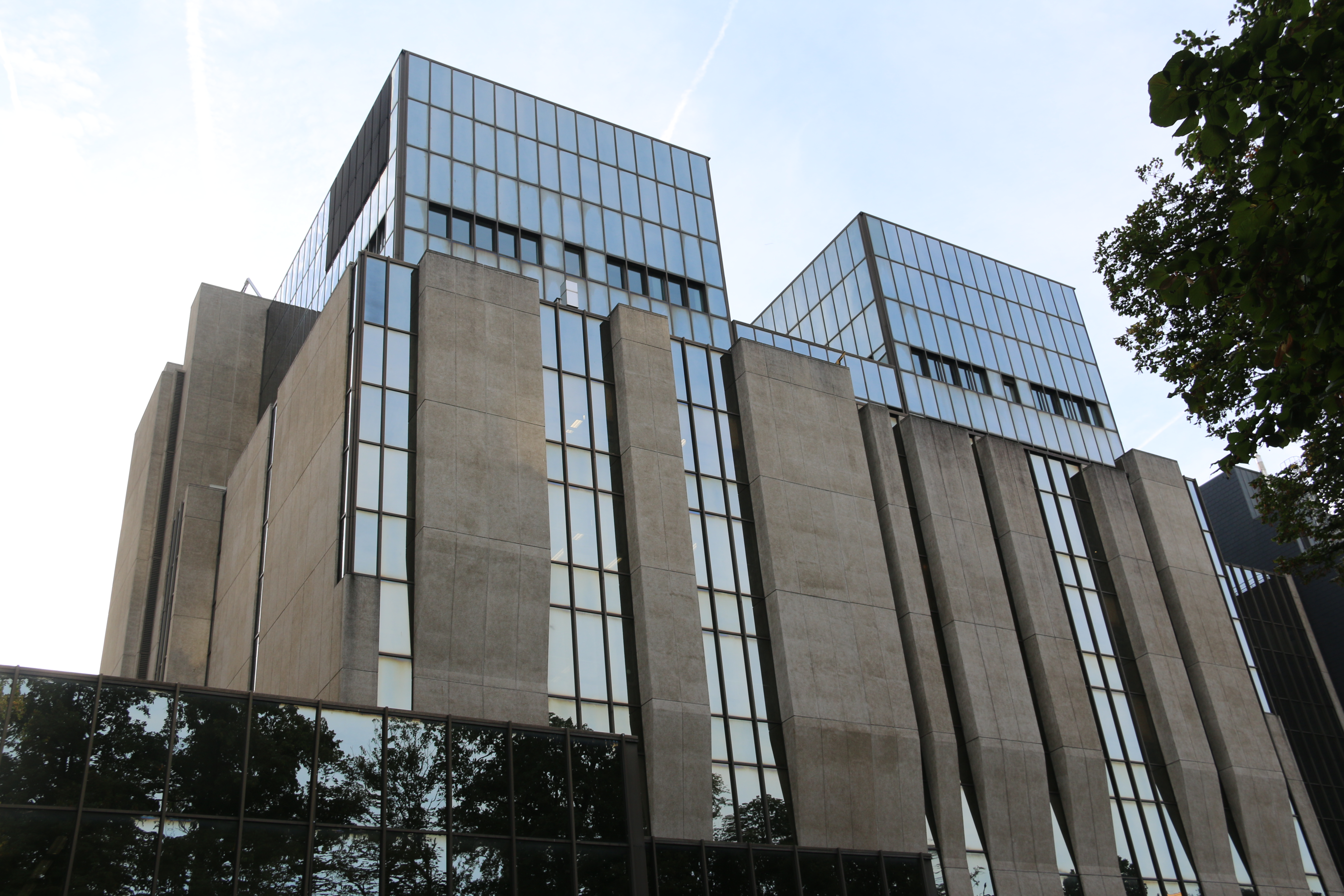
Albert Borschette conference centre, Brussels

From 1970 to 1976 he was a member of the European Commission with responsibility for competition, under the presidencies of Franco Maria Malfatti, Sicco Mansholt and François-Xavier Ortoli. His tenure saw the break-up of the sugar cartel. From 1970 to 1973, he was also the Commissioner for regional policy and the budget.

A conference centre in Brussels is named after him, of which a Dutch journalist once asked, what Borschette had committed, to merit having such an ugly building named after him. A street in Kirchberg in Luxembourg City is also named after him.

== Publications ==
- Journal russe (1946)
- Literatur und Politik (1951)
- Itinéraires (1952)
- Continuez à mourir (1959)
- Itinéraires soviétiques (1971)

== Notes ==
^{European Commissioner for Competition, Press, Information and Regional Policy from 1 July 1970 to 5 January 1973; Commissioner for Competition, Personnel and Administration from 6 January 1973 to 5 January 1977.}

Political offices
| Preceded by Maan Sassen | European Commissioner for Competition; 1970–1976 | Succeeded by Raymond Vouel |
| Preceded by Lambert Schaus | Luxembourgian European Commissioner; 1970–1976 | Succeeded by Raymond Vouel |
