= European Commissioner for Industry, SMEs and the Single Market =

Member of the EU Commission

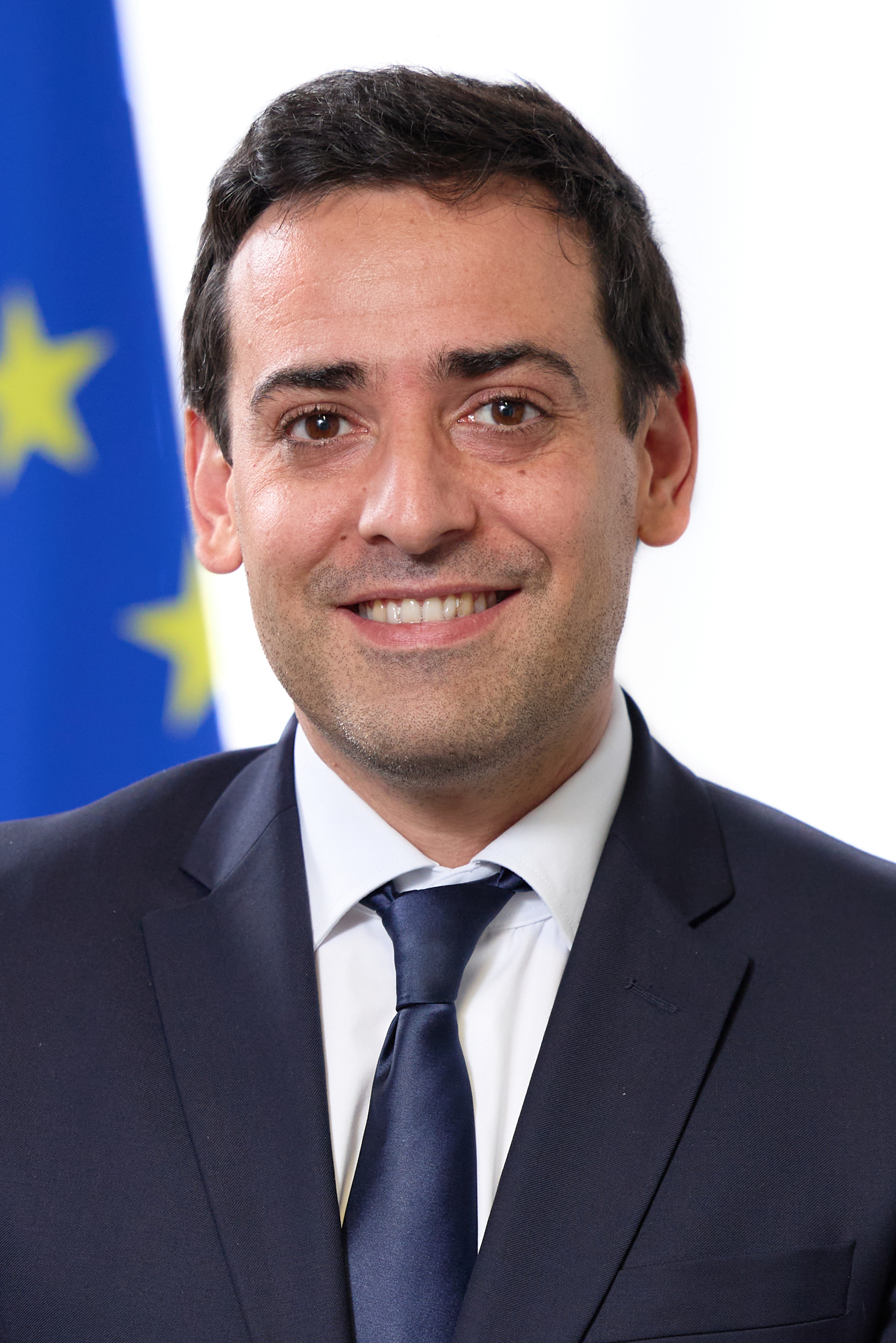
- Incumbent; Stéphane Séjourné since 1 December 2024
- European Commission
- Style: Mr. Commissioner
- Reports to: President of the European Commission
- Nominator: Member states in accordance with the President
- Appointer: The Parliament; sworn in by the Council
- Term length: Five years
- Formation: 1958
- First holder: Piero Malvestiti
- Salary: €19,909 monthly
- Website: ec.europa.eu

The European Commissioner for Industry, SMEs and the Single Market is a member of the European Commission. The post is currently held by Stéphane Séjourné, appointed in December 2024.

== Responsibilities ==
The portfolio concerns the development of the 480-million-strong European single market, promoting free movement of people, goods, services, and capital. Thus, it is clearly a leading role but has become more complex as the single market for services has developed. A large area of work is now financial services, a politically sensitive topic for some member states. The Commissioner controls the Directorate-General for Internal Market and Services, Directorate-General for Communications Networks, Content and Technology and the Office for Harmonization in the Internal Market.

== Stéphane Séjourné (2024–) ==
After taking office on 1 December 2024, Séjourné declared he would advocate for a “Europe First” strategy to protect the EU's strategic business interests. He emphasised the need for the EU to develop its industries, create employment, and foster growth, particularly in sectors like steel, car manufacturing, aerospace, and clean technologies. Séjourné also highlighted the importance of protecting historic industries, as they are crucial for the green transition and the development of other industries.

== Thierry Breton (2019–2024) ==
His profile was criticised amid allegations of a severe conflict of interest due to his previous positions at France Télécom and Atos. During his mandate, he promoted a strong line against abuses by major digital platforms (leading to the creation of the EU's Digital Services Act) and oversaw the production of COVID-19 vaccines.

He was an outspoken critic of European Commission president Ursula von der Leyen. Despite having been widely expected to serve a second term in the European Commission post 2024, he resigned from the position with immediate effect on 16 September 2024 after accusing von der Leyen of blocking his renomination to his portfolio.

Because of his instrumental role in developing the European Union Digital Services Act, he got sanctioned and declared persona non grata in the United States on 23 December 2025.

== Elżbieta Bieńkowska (2014–2019) ==
Elżbieta Bieńkowska is a former Polish regional development minister and a deputy prime minister. A self-described technocrat, she was appointed by the European Commission president Jean-Claude Juncker.

== Michel Barnier (2010–2014) ==
Barnier's appointment was controversial for some. His nomination came after the late 2000s recession led to criticism of bankers by many. Especially in France, there was a desire to more regulate the financial services sector, which in Europe is largely based around the City of London. French President Nicolas Sarkozy's declaration that Barnier's (then French foreign minister) appointment as Internal Market Commissioner was a "victory" produced considerable worry in the UK that France would use Barnier to push French-inspired restrictive regulation upon the UK's financial centre. Although he said that "we need to turn the page on an era of irresponsibility; we need to put transparency, responsibility and ethics at the heart of the financial system", he has tried to soothe worries in the UK and has reiterated his independence from national influence.

== Charlie McCreevy (2004–2010) ==
Charlie McCreevy's stated priorities were:

- To maximize the potential of the Internal Market to boost growth and employment.
- To eliminate remaining barriers to an effectively functioning internal market for services across member states.
- To deepen the integration of Europe's capital markets and improve its financial infrastructure so that the cost of capital is reduced, the inefficiencies of fragmentation are minimised and competition is intensified, to the overall benefit of Europe's economy.
- To ensure that existing internal market rules are properly enforced.
- To improve public procurement procedures to ensure that the European taxpayer gets value for money.
- To ensure an effective framework for the protection of intellectual property rights to encourage innovation in the new knowledge economy.

Directives McCreevy was involved with include the directives on:

- Services in the internal market
- Patentability of computer-implemented inventions

== Frits Bolkestein (1999–2004) ==
Commissioner Frits Bolkestein (Netherlands) served in the Prodi Commission between 1999 and 2004. In addition to holding the Internal Market portfolio, he also held Taxation and Customs Union. His head of cabinet was Laurs Nørlund.

Bolkestein is most notable for the Directive on services in the internal market, which is commonly called the "Bolkestein Directive". The directive aimed at enabling a company from one member state to recruit workers in another member state under the law of the company's home state. It was to help the development of the internal market for services, the development of which has lagged behind that for goods.

However, there was a great deal of concern about its effect on social standards and welfare, triggering competition between various parts of Europe. This led to significant protests across Europe against the directive, including a notable protest at the European Parliament in Strasbourg by port workers, which led to damage to the building. MEPs eventually reached a compromise on the text and the Parliament adopted it on 12 December 2006; 2 years after Bolkestein left office, under the Barroso Commission.

== List of commissioners ==
#	Name	Country	Period	Commission
1	Piero Malvestiti	Italy	1958–1959	Hallstein Commission I
2	Giuseppe Caron	Italy	1959–1963	Hallstein Commission I & II
3	Guido Colonna di Paliano	Italy	1964–1967	Hallstein Commission II
4	Hans von der Groeben	West Germany	1967–1970	Rey Commission
5	Wilhelm Haferkamp	West Germany	1970–1973	Malfatti Commission, Mansholt Commission
6	Finn Olav Gundelach	Denmark	1973–1977	Ortoli Commission
7	Étienne Davignon	Belgium	1977–1981	Jenkins Commission
8	Karl-Heinz Narjes	West Germany	1981–1985	Thorn Commission
9	Lord Cockfield	United Kingdom	1985–1989	Delors Commission I
10	Martin Bangemann	Germany	1989–1994	Delors Commission II & III
11	Raniero Vanni d'Archirafi	Italy	1992–1994	Delors Commission III
12	Mario Monti	Italy	1994–1999	Santer Commission
13	Frits Bolkestein	Netherlands	1999–2004	Prodi Commission
14	Charlie McCreevy	Ireland	2004–2010	Barroso Commission I
15	Michel Barnier	France	2010–2014	Barroso Commission II
16	Elżbieta Bieńkowska	Poland	2014–2019	Juncker Commission
17	Thierry Breton	France	2019–2024	Von der Leyen Commission I
18	Stéphane Séjourné	France	Since 2024	Von der Leyen Commission II

== See also ==
- Directive on services in the internal market
- Directorate-General for Internal Market and Services
- European Commissioner for Competition
- European Commissioner for Enterprise and Industry
- Markets in Financial Instruments Directive
- Office for Harmonization in the Internal Market
