= European Commissioner for Clean, Just and Competitive Transition =

Member of the EU Commission

- Flag of the EU

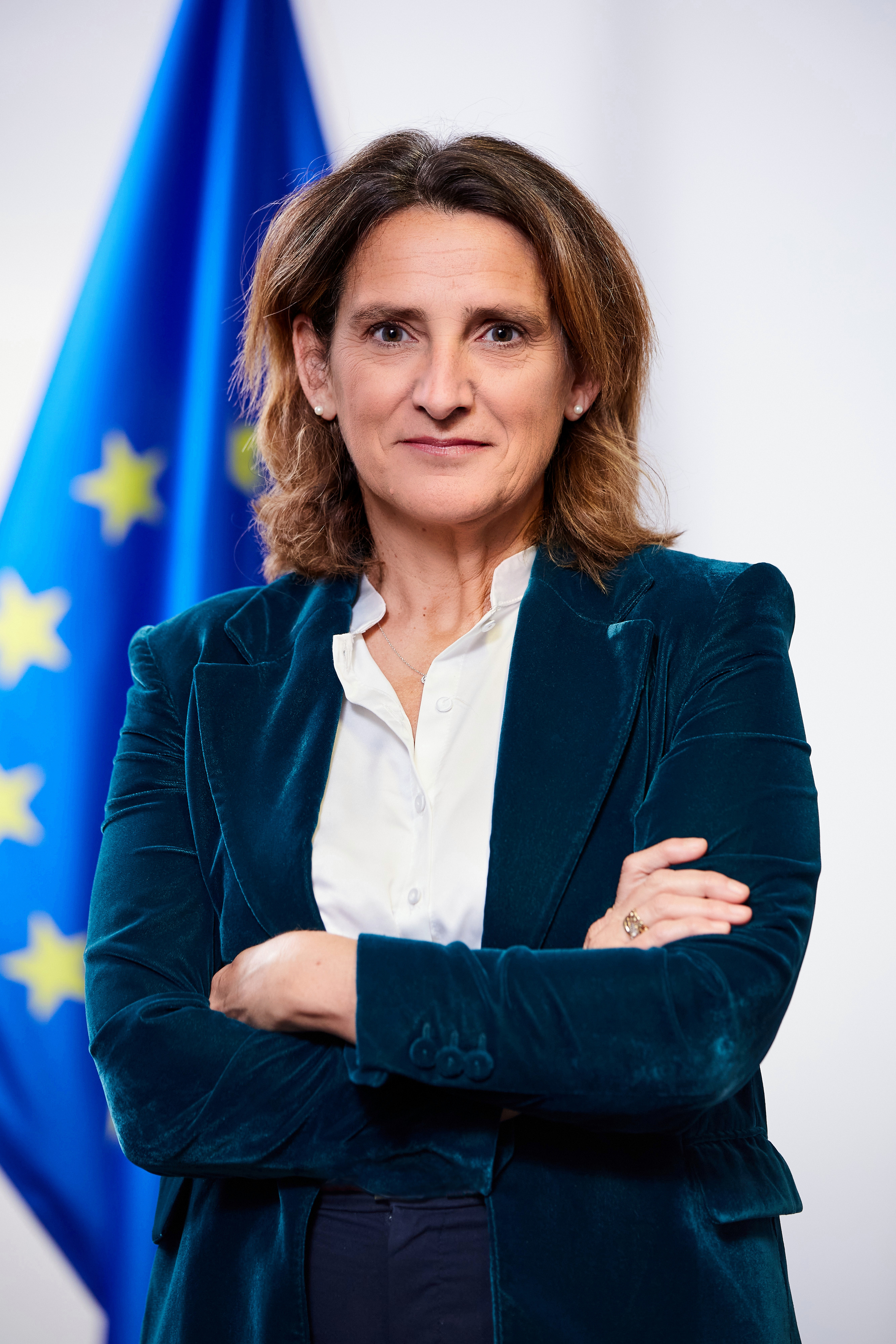
- Incumbent; Teresa Ribera since 1 December 2024
- Member of: the European Commission
- Reports to: President of the European Commission
- Term length: 5 years
- Formation: 7 January 1958; 68 years ago
- First holder: Hans von der Groeben

The Commissioner for Clean, Just and Competitive Transition is the member of the European Commission responsible for competition. The current commissioner is Teresa Ribera (Spanish Socialist Workers' Party).

== Responsibilities ==
The portfolio has responsibility for such matters as commercial competition, company mergers, cartels, state aid, and antitrust law. The position became the sole merger authority for the European Economic Area in September 1990.

The Competition Commissioner is one of the most powerful positions in the commission, and indeed the world, and is notable in affecting global regulatory practices in a phenomenon known as the Brussels effect. For example, preventing the merger of two US companies, General Electric and Honeywell, in 2001. In 2007, Neelie Kroes (then-Competition Commissioner) was the only Commissioner to make Forbes Magazine's List of The World's 100 Most Powerful Women; she held position 59.

== Past commissioners ==
=== Hans von der Groeben (1958-1967) ===
Hans von der Groeben was a close collaborator of Ludwig Ehrard and one of the main negotiators of the Treaty of Rome, which established the European Economic Community. He became the first commissioner for competition and played an important role in bringing about the first European law on cartels, Regulation No. 17/62.

=== Peter Sutherland (1985-1989) ===
When he was appointed European Commission for Competition in the Delors Commission, Peter Sutherland was the former Attorney General of Ireland. He pursued a vigorous policy of enforcing state aid rules and promoted the liberalization of new sectors, notably air transport and telecommunications.

=== Leon Brittan (1989-1993) ===
Leon Brittan played an instrumental role in the adoption of the Merger regulation in 1989. It gave the European the power to control mergers and ban those that were deemed to be detrimental to intra-european trade. Brittan banned the merger between the franco-Italian aircraff firm ATR and its competitor De Havilland, thus irritating the French President of the Commission Jacques Delors.

=== Mario Monti (1999–2004) ===
Mario Monti is particularly notable for his ruling during the GE-Honeywell merger attempt in 2001. General Electric, a US company, sought to acquire another US company, Honeywell. This merger had been approved by US authorities, however Monti, with the backing of the rest of the commission, rejected the merger;

The merger between GE and Honeywell, as it was notified, would have severely reduced competition in the aerospace industry and resulted ultimately in higher prices for customers, particularly airlines. However, there were ways of eliminating these concerns and allowing the merger to proceed. I regret that the companies were not able to agree on a solution that would have met the Commission's competition concerns.

Rather than be blocked from the European market, the merger was abandoned. This was the first time that a merger between two US companies had been blocked solely by European authorities, only the second time it had blocked just two US companies and only the 15th merger it had blocked ever since it started work. On 1 May 2004 Monti oversaw a radical change in the Competition powers of the Commission concerning antitrust regulation, merger controls, licensing agreements and air transport.

As an economist, Monti also promoted the "modernization" of EU competition policy, both in procedural and substantive terms, including the adoption of the "consumer welfare" standard.

=== Neelie Kroes (2004–10) ===
During Neelie Kroes' hearing at the European Parliament, MEPs expressed concern about whether Ms Kroes had a sufficiently detailed grasp of certain specific subjects. She was still approved as part of the Commission in 2004.

Since then, she stated that she promotes a fair and free business environment, achieving sustainable economic growth and higher employment. The commission has been involved in a number of high-profile cases fighting anticompetitive behaviour; such as the case against the merger of Sony – BMG, against Apple Inc. regarding iTunes and the ongoing case against Microsoft.

The latter has been an ongoing dispute on a number of issues. In April 2007, Microsoft became the first company to refuse to comply with the Commission's rulings. In response, Commissioner Kroes looked at harsher methods to gain the co-operation of companies. In September 2007, the Court of First Instance (the EU's second highest court) upheld the commission's decision to fine Microsoft 497 million euro and its order for to Microsoft for it to share its information, setting what the Commission described as an "important precedent". In response to the ruling, the United States Department of Justice's top antitrust official, Thomas Barnett, criticised the ruling. Kroes, in turn, stated that

"It is totally unacceptable that a representative of the US administration criticises an independent court of law outside its jurisdiction ... It is absolutely not on. The European Commission does not pass judgement on rulings by US courts and we expect the same degree of respect from US authorities for rulings by EU courts."

Kroes held a strong belief in free market principles. By the end of her term, she had completed most major cases.

=== Joaquín Almunia (2010–14) ===
Joaquín Almunia, previously the Finance Commissioner, took on the competition portfolio under the second Barroso Commission in 2010. He was expected to have a tenure similar to Kroes' stringent run. As an experienced appointee, he was welcomed by competition lawyers. He also impressed Parliament at his hearing. Early on in his term, he had to decide whether or not to pursue action against Google. He also came out in favour of the idea of a European Monetary Fund to deal with defaulting member states.

=== Margrethe Vestager (2014–2024) ===
Margrethe Vestager was part of both the Juncker and Von Der Leyen I college of Commissioners.

Her two terms at the European Commission were marked by strong enforcement across the full spectrum of competition policy. Some of the most notable cases were against the abuse of dominance by large digital companies and the Apple Tax case. To date, she had not lost a single case concerning abuses of dominance before the European Court of Justice.

In 2023, Vestager drew criticism for selecting Professor Fiona Scott Morton of Yale University, former chief economist of the Obama Administration, as Chief Competition Economist of DG COMP. Both her American nationality and consulting work for big tech came under fire by EU leaders, leading her to turn down the position.

=== Teresa Ribera (since 2024) ===
On 1 December 2024, Teresa Ribera was appointed First Executive Vice-President of the European Commission for Clean, Just and Competitive Transition and European Commissioner for Competition under the second Von der Leyen Commission. She is the first Competitoin Commissioner to have such a broach portfolio, as previous commissioners were responsible solely for competition policy, or almost exclusively so.

== List of commissioners ==
No.	Picture	Commissioner for Competition	Took office	Left office	Time in office	Party	European	Country	Commission
1	Hans von der Groeben	Hans von der Groeben (1907–2005)	7 January 1958	2 July 1967	9 years, 176 days	Independent	Independent	West Germany	Hallstein I–II
2	Maan Sassen	Maan Sassen (1911–1995)	30 June 1967	30 June 1970	3 years, 0 days	KVP	Independent	Netherlands	Rey
3	Albert Borschette	Albert Borschette (1920–1976)	1 July 1970	20 July 1976	6 years, 19 days	Independent	Independent	Luxembourg	Malfatti; Mansholt; Ortoli
4	Raymond Vouel	Raymond Vouel (1923–1987)	21 July 1976	6 January 1981	4 years, 170 days	LSAP	PES	Luxembourg	Ortoli; Jenkins
5	Frans Andriessen	Frans Andriessen (1929–2019)	6 January 1981	5 January 1985	3 years, 365 days	KVP	EPP	Netherlands	Thorn
6	Peter Sutherland	Peter Sutherland (1946–2018)	7 January 1985	5 January 1989	4 years, 0 days	Fine Gael	EPP	Ireland	Delors I
7	Leon Brittan	Leon Brittan (1939–2015)	6 January 1989	5 January 1993	3 years, 365 days	Conservative	ED	United Kingdom	Delors II
8	Karel Van Miert	Karel Van Miert (1942–2009)	6 January 1993	13 September 1999	6 years, 250 days	sp.a	PES	Belgium	Delors III; Santer
9	Mario Monti	Mario Monti (born 1943)	15 September 1999	30 October 2004	5 years, 45 days	Independent	Independent	Italy	Prodi
10	Neelie Kroes	Neelie Kroes (born 1941)	22 November 2004	9 February 2010	5 years, 79 days	VVD	ELDR	Netherlands	Barroso I
11	Joaquín Almunia	Joaquín Almunia (born 1948)	9 February 2010	1 November 2014	4 years, 265 days	PSOE	PES	Spain	Barroso II
12	Margrethe Vestager	Margrethe Vestager (born 1968)	1 November 2014	30 November 2024	10 years, 29 days	Social Liberals	ALDE	Denmark	Juncker; Von der Leyen I
12	Teresa Ribera	Teresa Ribera (born 1969)	30 November 2024	Incumbent	1 year, 351 days	PSOE	PES	Spain	Von der Leyen II

== See also ==
- Directorate-General for Competition
- European Union competition law
- European Union v. Microsoft
