= Michele Angelo Cianciulli =

Marquis in the Kingdom of Sicily (1734–1819)

Michele Angelo Cianciulli, called Michelangelo within his family, was a marquis and statesman of the Kingdom of Sicily.

He was born in Montella on 1 August 1734 and studied law at the University of Naples. He was regent of the Kingdom of Sicily from 8 July 1808 until 1 August 1808 when Ferdinand I of the Two Sicilies handed over the crown of the Kingdom to Joseph Bonaparte and to Murat. He was appointed as Minister of Justice and settled the bill of law abolishing feudalism.

He died in Naples on Sunday 16 May 1819.

== See also ==
- Ferdinand I of the Two Sicilies
- Giuseppe Bonaparte
- Joachim Murat

== Bibliography ==
- G. Passaro, La Repubblica Napoletana e gli eventi nell'Alta valle del Calore, Ed. del Centro di Ricerca "G. D'Orso", Avellino 2004
