= Leonard Orban =

Romanian technocrat (born 1961)

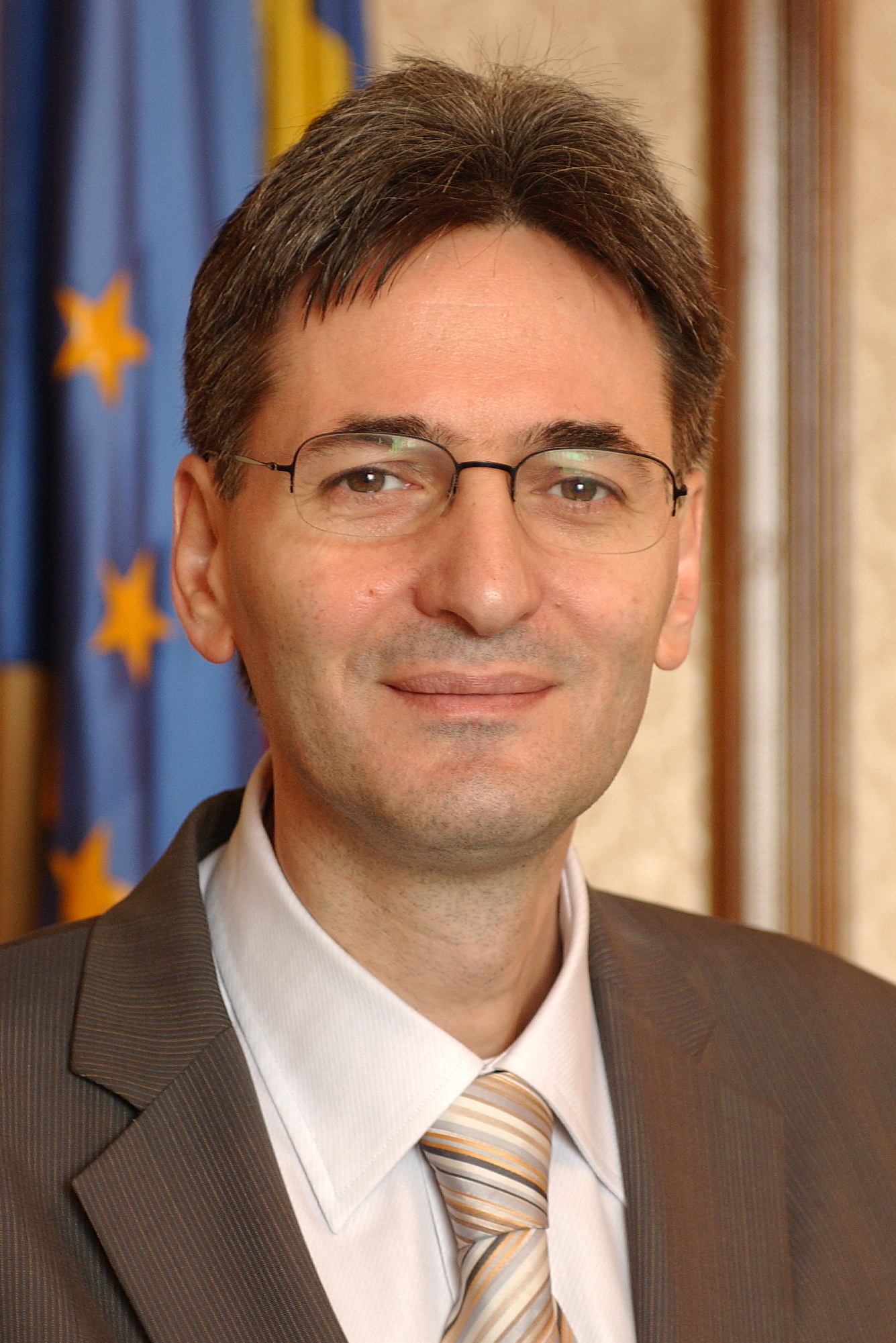
- Orban in 2006

European Commissioner for Multilingualism
- In office 1 January 2007 – 9 February 2010
- President: José Manuel Barroso
- Preceded by: Ján Figeľ (Education, Training, Culture and Multilingualism)
- Succeeded by: Androulla Vassiliou (Education, Culture, Multilingualism and Youth)

Ministry of European Affairs
- In office 20 September 2011 – 21 December 2012
- President: Traian Băsescu
- Prime Minister: Emil Boc; Mihai Ungureanu; Victor Ponta

Personal details
- Born: 28 June 1961 (age 65) Braşov, Romania
- Party: National Liberal Party (PNL)
- Spouse: Married
- Children: 1
- Education: Transylvania University of Braşov; Bucharest Academy of Economic Studies
- Profession: Engineer; Economist

Leonard Orban (born 28 June 1961) is a Romanian independent technocrat who served as the Commissioner for Multilingualism in the European Commission, the executive body of the European Union (EU). He was responsible for the EU language policy and was the first Romanian Commissioner and the first member of the Commission whose portfolio is exclusively multilingualism. His term of office began on 1 January 2007 and ended on 9 February 2010. With a background in engineering and economics, Orban has taken up various posts working for the accession of Romania to the European Union, most prominently as Deputy and later as Chief Negotiator for his country at the time of final negotiations with the European Union.

Steering the multilingualism language policy of the EU, Orban focused on promoting foreign language learning through EU programmes such as the Lifelong Learning Programme 2007–2013. In addition, his remit also included the effective functioning of the EU's extensive interpretation, translation and publication services in the 23 official languages. To support the remit of his portfolio, Orban oversaw a staff of 3,400 in total (approximately 15 per cent of the Brussels executive's workforce) and approximately 1 per cent of the EU budget.

Though unaffiliated to any political party, Orban adheres to liberalism. He supports Romania's closer European integration and a strong European Union, and were in favour of the relaunch of the frozen Treaty establishing a Constitution for Europe without modifications to the original text.

Between 2011 and 2012 he was the Romanian Minister of European Affairs in the second Boc, Ungureanu and first Ponta cabinets.

== Early years and personal life ==
Orban was born in Braşov, central Romania, to an ethnic Hungarian father and an ethnic Romanian mother. His brother, Ludovic Orban, a prominent politician and former president of Romania's National Liberal Party (PNL) as well as a former Transport Minister, was Romania's Prime Minister between 2019 and 2020.

Leonard Orban is married and has a daughter, and his personal interests range across foreign policy, classical music, reading, and cinema.

Orban gained a bachelor's degree (1981–1986) in engineering at the Faculty of Mechanical Engineering, Transylvania University of Braşov, and a bachelor's degree (1987–1992) in economics at the Faculty of Management, Bucharest Academy of Economic Studies. Alongside Romanian, he is also fluent in English and French and has passive knowledge of Italian.

Between 1986 and 1993, he worked as engineer for Tractor Manufacturing Company Miercurea Ciuc (1986–1989, Romanian: Întreprinderea de Tractoare Miercurea Ciuc), Enterprise for Special Industrial Constructions Bucharest (1989–1990, Romanian: Întreprinderea de Antrepriza Construcţii Speciale Industriale şi Montaj (I.A.C.S.I.M.) București) and Institute of Research for Machine Manufacturing Technology Bucharest (1990–1993, Romanian: Institutul de Cercetare Tehnologia Construcţiilor de Maşini (I.C.T.C.M.) București).

== Working for European affairs ==
From 1993 to 2001, Orban served as a Parliamentary Counsellor on European and International Affairs within the Chamber of Deputies of the Romanian Parliament, where he was responsible for the European Integration Committee, as well as relations with the European Parliament. In 1995, the Association Agreement between the EU and Romania came into force and Orban also dealt with the Secretariat of the Joint Parliamentary Committee EU-Romania. Between May 2001 and December 2004, he served as Deputy Chief Negotiator and from December 2004 to December 2006, as Chief Negotiator with the EU and as Secretary of State of the Ministry of European Integration of Romania, directly responsible for coordinating Romania's preparation for accession to the EU, as well as drafting the Treaty of Accession. On 25 April 2005, together with the Romanian president Traian Băsescu, the Romanian prime minister Călin Popescu-Tăriceanu and the Romanian foreign minister Mihai Răzvan Ungureanu, Orban was one of the signatories for Romania on the country's Treaty of Accession in Luxembourg. After the signing of the Treaty, when Romania received the status of the observer in the Council of the European Union and in the commission's committees, Orban was responsible for coordinating Romania's policies and positions in EU affairs. On 30 October 2006, Orban was nominated as Romania's candidate for the European Commission. From 1 January 2007, Orban became European Commissioner for Multilingualism for Romania in the Barroso commission. He wrote numerous newspaper articles and analyses and gave several speeches on European affairs.

Orban has not joined a political party, but is of liberal political leaning. He participated as an independent in the European Parliament political group Alliance of Liberals and Democrats for Europe (ALDE).

== Portfolio as European Commissioner ==
As European Commissioner for Multilingualism in the Barroso Commission, Orban was responsible for the language policy of the European Union, i.e. promoting multilingualism for the citizens and the institutions of the European Union. He was the first to hold this portfolio. Multilingualism has previously and subsequently been a responsibility of the European Commissioner for Education, Training, Culture and Multilingualism, Ján Figeľ, the first Commissioner whose portfolio explicitly included multilingualism.

Politically, the portfolio is focused on promoting foreign languages learning, specifically, an individual's mother tongue plus two other languages, as means for the worker's mobility and business competitiveness.

Though awareness for linguistic diversity is a policy target, the language rights of speakers of regional, minority, lesser-used and migrant languages are not legally protected. In the European Union, language policy is the responsibility of member states and European Union does not have a "common language policy." Based on the "principle of subsidiarity", European Union institutions play a supporting role in this field, promoting cooperation between the member states and promoting the European dimension in their language policies, particularly through the teaching and dissemination of their languages. The content of educational systems is the responsibility of individual member states and the European Union has very limited influence in this area. However, a number of European Union funded programmes actively promote language learning, most prominently under the much wider Lifelong learning Programme 2007–2013. Though regional and minority languages can benefit from European Union programmes, protection of linguistic rights is a matter for the member states.

Orban was also responsible for the effective functioning of the European Union's extensive interpretation, translation and publication services in the 23 official languages of the Union. Language policy affects the overall European Union strategy of communication with its citizens and the effort to establish a European identity. In many of these issues, responsibility was shared with other Commissioners, namely the European Commissioner for Education, Training and Culture, Ján Figeľ. Orban was also responsible, alongside the President of the Commission, Barroso, and Figeľ to work on "intercultural dialogue", including the 2008 European Year of Intercultural Dialogue.

Administratively, Orban was in charge of the Directorate-General (DG) for Translation, the DG for Interpretation and the Office for Official Publications of the European Communities, as well as the Multilingualism policy unit (EAC-C-5) in the DG for Education and Culture. In total, Orban is responsible for overseeing 3,400 staff (approximately 15 per cent of the Brussels executive's workforce) and approximately 1 per cent of the EU budget.

Orban was assisted by a cabinet of nine members; Patricia Bugnot (French) was Head of Cabinet and Jochen Richter (German) was Deputy Head. The cabinet did not include any natively anglophone member. Orban's salary was €18,233.38 (approx. US$23,631, c.2007) a month plus housing allowance.

== Appointment procedure ==
According to Article 45 of the protocol to the Accession Treaty of Bulgaria and Romania, the new members of the Commission representing the acceding member states were appointed by the Council of the European Union in common accord with the President of the commission and after consultation with the European Parliament. Compared to former enlargements of the European Union, the Accession Treaty for Bulgaria and Romania, for the first time, contains an explicit acknowledgement of the Parliament's role and constitutes the formal legal basis for the new Commissioners' appointment procedure.

On 30 October 2006, in agreement with the President of the commission, Barroso, the Romanian government nominated Leonard Orban as Commissioner designate for Romania. Barroso assigned him the portfolio of multilingualism. Before Orban, Varujan Vosganian, a former Romanian National Liberal Party Minister of Economy and Commerce, had been nominated, but withdrew his candidature due to allegations concerning his past involvement with the secret police under Ceauşescu and party financing by a tycoon. National Liberal Party foreign minister Mihai Răzvan Ungureanu refused a nomination.

The assignment of the multilingualism portfolio to the Romanian Commissioner by Barroso was highly controversial. Barroso was severely criticized for creating a new Commissioner portfolio so that the accessing countries in 2007 could hold a post. The portfolio was criticized for being too "light" for such a high-rank official, that there would be an overlap of responsibilities with other Commissioners and the good functioning of the commission would be endangered. The portfolio was considered insubstantial for a Commissioner due to the limited jurisdiction of the EU in affecting language policy and the more administrative (rather than political character) of the post. In addition, it appeared that the portfolio had been created to complete a 27-strong Commission; Romania's appointment of a technocrat rather than a politician, given the country's deficits in interior and justice policies, especially in terms of corruption, would result in the Romanian Commissioner taking a degraded portfolio. This criticism came from the Social Democratic Party (PSD), Romania's main opposition party, the Socialist Group (PES) in the European Parliament and the liberal Financial Times newspaper. Socialist Group leader, Martin Schulz, suggested a portfolio for the protection of ethnic minorities instead. The Conference of Presidents of the European Parliament asked Barroso to clarify the mandate of the Commissioner for Multilingualism as well as the mandate of the other members of the commission with regards to the "intercultural dialogue". Barroso turned down the PES proposal and defended the post. He stated that Ján Figeľ, the Commissioner for Education, Training and Culture, "will remain responsible for the management of actions to directly promote the inter-cultural dialogue".

After a public hearing in Brussels at the Committee on Culture and Education (CULT) of the European Parliament in participation with the Committee on Constitutional Affairs (AFCO) on 27 November 2006, the Committee gave a positive assessment. On December 12, 2006, Orban received the formal approval of the European Parliament in Strasbourg with 595 votes in favour, 16 against and 29 abstentions. The Socialist Group voted for Orban, laying the blame for the portfolio's mandate on the President of the Commission rather than the Commissioner designate. On 1 January 2007 he was appointed by the Council and on 22 January 2007, in a ceremony in Luxembourg, Orban was sworn in before the European Court of Justice.

Orban held the position of European Commissioner until 31 October 2009, when the remaining term of office for the Barroso Commission ends.

== Views on multilingualism ==
In his hearing at the European Parliament, Leonard Orban focused on defending the importance of his post in presenting the EU language policy, emphasising foreign language learning and describing the concrete initiatives he intended to implement.

Orban said that he intended to spearhead the commission's work on a portfolio that has become more important with every enlargement and assured the Members of the European Parliament that his portfolio was a substantial one, covering a range of important political and managerial responsibilities. He also described how his portfolio would contribute to economic competitiveness, the social dimension of the EU and the intercultural dialogue and stated that it would provide a forum for European political dialogue.

Orban told the Committee that the multilingual dimension of the EU must be made mainstream in all relevant EU policies and programmes and should not be seen as a separate, isolated policy. He stated that, "Politically, I will steer the Commission's work on bringing an active multilingualism policy into a variety of policies which are the key to the functioning of the EU and the internal market: culture, education and competitiveness." In addition, he claimed that multilingualism would be commercially advantageous as, "At first sight, one single language might appear easier to manage [... but] multilingualism can also give any industry a competitive advantage if it helps them to tap local markets and create new products which also cater for multilingualism." According to Orban, multilingualism promotes labour mobility, tolerance and a sense of European citizenship and, as an integral aspect of the legitimacy, transparency and democracy of the European integration, it contributes to a successful EU communication policy. Within the Lisbon strategy, the target for foreign language learning is "mother tongue plus two," which means that English language skills on their own are not sufficient. To address this, Orban aims to improve language teaching and to make the media and new communication technologies more language-friendly. He underlined that, "our efforts to support multilingualism are not limited to EU languages; we are also encouraging training in Chinese, Japanese, Arabic, Turkish and Russian." He added that, "The promotion of language learning and linguistic diversity is a general objective of the new programme for lifelong learning launched in 2007. For the first time, it will be open to all languages spoken in the European Union as well as to the languages of the EU's main trading partners." Orban claims that respect for linguistic diversity and the fight against discrimination on the basis of language are cornerstones for a social Europe; he states that, "Europe's linguistic and cultural diversity is a source of richness which also needs to be nurtured and promoted," which presumably includes all languages, national, regional, minority and migrant. However, Orban agreed that the protection of language rights was a matter for individual member states and his view is that, "When it comes to language rights, I am not in favour of adopting legislation at European level to be imposed on Member States."

Orban's remit included the development of the European Indicator of Language Competence, the creation of a Business Forum on Multilingualism and Juvenes Translatores, a translation contest between schools from all over Europe as part of the events marking the 50th anniversary of the Treaty of Rome. In addition to the Lifelong Learning Programme 2007–2013 and other educational and cultural programmes, Orban promoted multilingualism within other relevant policies and programmes, including the Seventh Framework Programme for Research and Technological Development, the European Social Fund and immigration initiatives. He also intended to contribute to the 2008 European Year of Intercultural Dialogue, where multilingualism played a fundamental part. On planning further policy, Orban promised to, "carefully analyse the results from the Action Plan for the promotion of language learning and linguistic diversity, the recommendations from the High Level Group on Multilingualism and the activities of the Commission internal network for multilingualism. Before the end of 2007, I would organise a Ministerial conference to discuss the way forward. I would then propose a new Action Plan in 2008 to continue work in this area."

His views on multilingualism fall in line with the current European Union language policy as described in the Communication from the Commission "A New Framework Strategy for Multilingualism" on 22 November 2005.

== Views on EU-Romania relations and the European integration ==
Orban defended Romania's accession to the EU, believing that Romania can only gain from its entry and stressing the importance of a post-accession strategy for his country.

On the "future of Europe", Orban believes in a strong, cohesive European Union capable of being a major actor on the global scene. In addition, he stressed the need to increase the pace of the implementation of the Lisbon Strategy, a ten-year strategy designed to make the European Union the world's most competitive economy by 2010. Institutionally, he supported the Treaty establishing a Constitution for Europe, voted down in referendums in France and Netherlands in 2005, believing that it should be ratified by the member states without further negotiations or without excluding some of its provisions.

Political offices
| New office | Romanian European Commissioner; 2007–present | Succeeded by Dacian Cioloş |
| Preceded by Ján Figeľ as European Commissioner for Education, Training, Culture and Multilingualism | European Commissioner for Multilingualism; 2007–2010 | Succeeded by Androulla Vassiliou as European Commissioner for Education, Culture, Multilingualism and Youth |
