= Jargon =

Specialist terminology often understood only by a certain group

Jargon, or technical language, is the specialized terminology associated with a particular field or area of activity. Jargon is normally employed in a particular communicative context and may not be well understood outside that context. The context is usually a particular occupation (that is, a certain trade, profession, vernacular or academic field), but any ingroup can have jargon. The key characteristic that distinguishes jargon from the rest of a language is its specialized vocabulary, which includes terms and definitions of words that are unique to the context, and terms used in a narrower and more exact sense than when used in colloquial language. This can lead outgroups to misunderstand communication attempts. Jargon is sometimes understood as a form of technical slang and then distinguished from the official terminology used in a particular field of activity.

The terms jargon, slang, and argot are not consistently differentiated in the literature; different authors interpret these concepts in varying ways. According to one definition, jargon differs from slang in being secretive in nature; according to another understanding, it is specifically associated with professional and technical circles. Some sources, however, treat these terms as synonymous. The use of jargon became more popular around the 16th century attracting persons from different career paths. This led to printed copies which are available on the various forms of jargon.

== Specifics ==
Jargon, also referred to as "technical language", is "the technical terminology or characteristic idiom of a special activity or group". Most jargon is technical terminology (technical terms), involving terms of art or industry terms, with particular meaning within a specific industry. The primary driving forces in the creation of technical jargon are precision, efficiency of communication, and professionalism. Terms and phrases that are considered jargon have meaningful definitions, and through frequency of use, can become catchwords.

While jargon allows greater efficiency in communication among those familiar with it, jargon also raises the threshold of comprehensibility for outsiders. This is usually accepted as an unavoidable trade-off but it may also be used as a means of social exclusion (reinforcing ingroup–outgroup barriers) or social aspiration (when introduced as a way of demonstrating expertise). Some academics promote the use of jargon-free language, or plain language, as an audience may be alienated or confused by the technical terminology, and thus lose track of a speaker or writer's broader and more important arguments.

Some words with both a technical and a non-technical meaning are referred to as semi-technical vocabulary: for example, Chinh Ngan Nguyen Le and Julia Miller refer to colon as an anatomical term and also a punctuation mark; and Derek Matravers refers to person and its plural form persons as technical language used in philosophy, where their meaning is more specific than "person" and "people" in their everyday use.

== Etymology ==
The French word is believed to have been derived from the Latin word gaggire, meaning "to chatter", which was used to describe speech that the listener did not understand. The word may also come from Old French jargon meaning "chatter of birds". Middle English also has the verb jargounen meaning "to chatter", or "twittering", deriving from Old French.

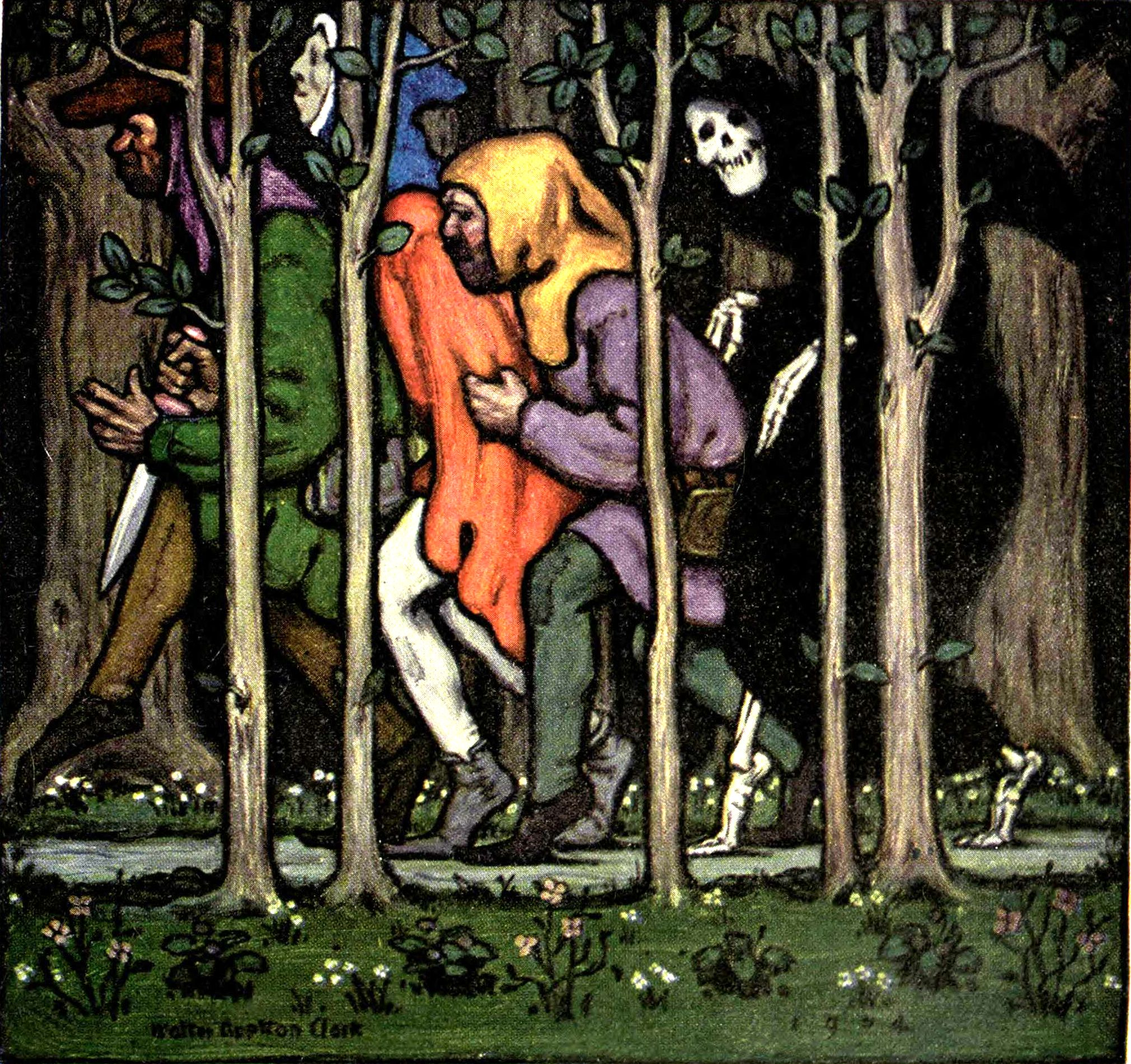
The Canterbury Tales by Geoffrey Chaucer is the first known use of the term "jargon" in English literature.

The first known use of the word in English is found within The Canterbury Tales, written by Geoffrey Chaucer between 1387 and 1400. Chaucer related "jargon" to the vocalizations of birds.

In colonial history, jargon was seen as a device of communication to bridge the gap between two speakers who did not speak the same tongue. Jargon was synonymous with pidgin in naming specific language usages. Jargon then began to have a negative connotation with lacking coherent grammar, or gibberish as it was seen as a "broken" language of many different languages with no full community to call their own. In the 1980s, linguists began restricting this usage of jargon to keep the word to more commonly define a technical or specialized language use.

=== Fields using the term ===
In linguistics, it is used to mean "specialist language", with the term also seen as closely related to slang, argot and cant. Various kinds of language peculiar to ingroups can be named across a semantic field. Slang can be either culture-wide or known only within a certain group or subculture. Argot is slang or jargon purposely used to obscure meaning to outsiders. Conversely, a lingua franca is used for the opposite effect, helping communicators to overcome unintelligibility, as are pidgins and creole languages. For example, Chinook Jargon was a pidgin. Although technical jargon's primary purpose is to aid technical communication, not to exclude outsiders by serving as an argot, it can have both effects at once and can provide a technical ingroup with shibboleths. For example, medieval guilds could use this as one means of informal protectionism. On the other hand, jargon that once was obscure outside a small ingroup can become generally known over time. For example, the terms bit, byte, and hexadecimal (which are terms from computing jargon) are now recognized by many people outside computer science.

=== Referenced ===
The philosopher Étienne Bonnot de Condillac observed in 1782 that "every science requires a special language because every science has its own ideas". As a rationalist member of the Enlightenment, he continued: "It seems that one ought to begin by composing this language, but people begin by speaking and writing, and the language remains to be composed."

== Industry term ==
An industry word is a specialized kind of technical terminology used in a certain industry. Industry words and phrases are often used in a specific area, and those in that field know and use the terminology.

Precise technical terms and their definitions are formally recognized, documented, and taught by educators in the field. Other terms are more colloquial, coined and used by practitioners in the field, and are similar to slang. The boundaries between formal and slang jargon, as in general English, are quite fluid. This is especially true in the rapidly developing world of computers and networking. For instance, the term firewall (in the sense of a device used to filter network traffic) was at first technical slang. As these devices became more widespread and the term became widely understood, the word was adopted as formal terminology.

Technical terminology evolves due to the need for experts in a field to communicate with precision and brevity but often has the effect of excluding those who are unfamiliar with the particular specialized language of the group. This can cause difficulties, for example, when a patient is unable to follow the discussions of medical practitioners, and thus cannot understand his own condition and treatment. Differences in jargon also cause difficulties where professionals in related fields use different terms for the same phenomena.

=== Corporate jargon ===
The use of jargon in the business world is a common occurrence. The use of jargon in business correspondence reached a high popularity between the late 1800s into the 1950s. In this context, jargon is most frequently used in modes of communication such as emails, reports, and other forms of documentation. Common phrases used in corporate jargon include:

- Common share
- Dividend
- KPI (Key Performance Indicator)
- Pursuant
- ROI (Return on Investment)
- SWOT analysis (Strengths, Weaknesses, Opportunities, and Threats)
- Undersigned

=== Medical jargon ===
Medicine professionals make extensive use of scientific terminology. Most patients encounter medical jargon when referring to their diagnosis or when receiving or reading their medication. Some commonly used terms in medical jargon are:

- Code blue
- Dyspnea
- Hematoma
- Hypertension
- Palliative care
- Tachycardia

At first glance, many people do not understand what these terms mean and may panic when they see these scientific names being used in reference to their health. The argument as to whether medical jargon is a positive or negative attribute of a patient's experience has evidence to support both sides. On one hand, as mentioned before, these phrases can be overwhelming for some patients who may not understand the terminology. However, with the accessibility of the internet, it has been suggested that these terms can be used and easily researched for clarity.

=== Legal jargon ===
Jargon is commonly found in the field of law. These terms are often used in legal contexts such as legal documents, court proceedings, contracts, and more. Some common terms in this profession include:

- Acquittal
- Affidavit
- Adjudication
- Libel
- Litigation
- Tort

=== Education jargon ===
There is specialized terminology within the field of education. Educators and administrators use these terms to communicate ideas specific to the education system. Common terms and acronyms considered to be jargon that are used within this profession include:

- Capstone project
- Curriculum
- ELL (English Language Learner)
- IEP (Individualized Education Program)
- Pedagogy
- PLC (Professional Learning Community)
- STEM (Science, Technology, Engineering, and Mathematics)

=== In practice ===
Jargon may serve the purpose of a "gatekeeper" in conversation, signaling who is allowed into certain forms of conversation. Jargon may serve this function by dictating to which direction or depth a conversation about or within the context of a certain field or profession will go. For example, a conversation between two professionals in which one person has little previous interaction or knowledge of the other person could go one of at least two possible ways. One of the professionals (who the other professional does not know) does not use, or does not correctly use the jargon of their respective field, and is little regarded or remembered beyond small talk or fairly insignificant in this conversation. Or, if the person does use particular jargon (showing their knowledge in the field to be legitimate, educated, or of particular significance) the other professional then opens the conversation up in an in-depth or professional manner. The use of jargon can create a divide in communication, or strengthen it. Outside of conversation, jargon can become confusing in writing. When used in text, readers can become confused if there are terms used that require outside knowledge on the subject.

== Positivity ==
Ethos is used to create an appeal to authority. It is one of three pillars of persuasion created by Aristotle to create a logical argument. Ethos uses credibility to back up arguments. It can indicate to the audience that a speaker is an insider with using specialized terms in the field to make an argument based on authority and credibility.

Jargon can be used to convey meaningful information and discourse in a convenient way within communities. A subject expert may wish to avoid jargon when explaining something to a layperson. Jargon may help communicate contextual information optimally. For example, a football coach talking to their team or a doctor working with nurses.

== Accessibility and criticism ==
With the rise of the self-advocacy within the Disability Rights Movement, "jargonized" language has started to face repeated rejection for being language that is widely inaccessible. However, jargon is largely present in everyday language such as in newspapers, financial statements, and instruction manuals. To combat this, several advocacy organizations are working on influencing public agents to offer accessible information in different formats. One accessible format that offers an alternative to jargonized language is "easy read", which consists of a combination of plain language and images.

The criticism against jargon can be found in certain fields where professionals communicate with individuals with no industry background. In a study done by analyzing 58 patients and 10 radiation therapists, professionals diagnosed and explained the treatment of a disease to a patient with the use of jargon. It was found that using jargon left patients confused about what the treatments and risks were, suggesting that jargon in the medical field is not the best in communicating the terminology and concepts.

== Quantification ==
Jargon has been quantified using a piecewise mathematical function called jargonness, which maps the frequencies of appearance of a word in scientific and contemporary English corpora to a parameter—called jargonness itself—quantifying the word's association with scientific jargon. It is expressed as:

$$\text{jargonness} = \begin{cases} \log \left ( \frac{f_s}{f_g} \right ), & f_g > 0 \\ 3,  & f_g = 0  \end{cases}$$

In the above equation, $f_g$ stands for the frequency of a word's appearance in a general English-language corpus, $f_s$ stands for its frequency in a scientific corpus, and $log$ is the common (base-10) logarithm.

Examples of corpora used in the determination of these frequencies include the Professional English Research Consortium Corpus (scientific) and the British National Corpus (common).

== Jargon glossaries ==
Many examples of jargon exist because of its use among specialists and subcultures alike. In the professional world, those who are in the business of filmmaking may use words like "vorkapich" to refer to a montage when talking to colleagues. In rhetoric, rhetoricians use words like "arete" to refer to a person of power's character when speaking with one another.

- Architectural terminology
- Ballet terminology
- Binomial nomenclature
- Blazon (Heraldic terminology)
- Business jargon
- Chemical nomenclature
- Computing jargon
- Corporate jargon
- Cricket terminology
- Economics terminology that differs from common usage
- Fencing terminology
- Flag terminology
- Language of mathematics
  - Mathematical jargon
- Legal terms
- Medical terminology
- Motion Picture terminology
- Musical terminology
- Nautical terms (A-L)
- Nautical terms (M-Z)
- Padonkaffsky jargon
- Professional Wrestling terminology
- Poker terminology
- Scientific terminology
  - International scientific vocabulary
- Wine tasting descriptors

== See also ==
- Academese
- Colloquialism
- Cryptolect
- Eurodicautom
- Gibberish
- Idola fori
- Jargon File
- Legalese
- Lexigraf
- Natural language
- Nomenclature
- Orismology
- P convention
- Phraseme
- Pidgin
- Polari
- Procedure word
- Register (sociolinguistics)
- Specification (technical standard)
- Technical standard
- Thieves' cant
- Three-letter acronym
- Variety (linguistics)
- Technobabble
