= Terminology Coordination Unit of the European Parliament =

Unit overview
- Formed: 2008; 18 years ago
- Jurisdiction: Europe
- Headquarters: Luxembourg
- Website: termcoord.eu

The Terminology Coordination Unit (TermCoord) is a supporting unit to the translation units of the Directorate-General for Translation (DG TRAD) of the European Parliament. TermCoord was created in 2008 by Rodolfo Maslias, professor at the Universities Luxembourg and Savoie-Mont Blanc, to stimulate and coordinate the terminology work of the 24 translation units of the European Parliament in Luxembourg.

It provides the terminologists and translators with tools, resources, support and training to facilitate their daily translation tasks. TermCoord also works to increase the European Parliament's inter-institutional contribution to the EU terminology database IATE.

== Background and history ==
Today's European Union legislation is drafted in 24 official languages, with each language version considered authentic. Thus, translation is an integral part in the process of drafting and adopting legal acts. The European Institutions employ many hundreds of translators to cover the major part of these translation needs and the 552 possible language combinations. The translation system must be regularly brought into line with constantly evolving legislative procedures and technology.

For this reason, the importance of terminology has become increasingly clear. Back when the European Parliament worked with less than ten official languages a Terminology Division was created with the aim of collecting glossaries and other terminology material. Later on, this division was combined with the IT service, resulting in the creation of the Euterpe database (European Terminology for the European Parliament).

Alongside the development of inter-institutional translation memory systems (internal Euramis), previously separate resources such as the Commission's Eurodicautom and Parliament's Euterpe, were merged into the common inter-institutional terminology database IATE (InterActive Terminology for Europe), which has been used by the EU's translation services since summer 2004. IATE was made available to the general public in June 2007. Today the database contains roughly 8.7 million terms and on its public version it receives on average 5000 queries per hour from all over the world.

In 2008, Parliament decided to set up a service to coordinate all issues related to the IATE database and the terminology work carried out in the translation units. At the start, the service was staffed by three permanent officials. The officials recruited later on to the unit through internal competitions have been assigned specific tasks.

The permanent staff, currently numbering ten officials, is assisted by both graduate and undergraduate trainees, who contribute to the achievements of the unit by using their specialised knowledge and skills during a traineeship period of 1–6 months.

Terminology coordination involves constant cooperation with a network of about 100 terminologists responsible for terminology matters in their translation units and carrying out terminology assignments set by TermCoord; volunteer groups working on certain projects; and rotating terminologists seconded to the unit for three months. The rotating terminologists' main responsibilities include participating in TermCoord's work on IATE, in particular doing updates in their native language, and liaising with the translation units to identify best practices.

== Interinstitutional cooperation ==
The IATE database receives support and funding from the three legislative institutions (European Commission, Council of the European Union and European Parliament), the European Economic and Social Committee, the Committee of the Regions, the Court of Auditors and the Translation Centre for the Bodies of the European Union. The European Court of Justice, the European Investment Bank and the European Central Bank are also involved in providing specialised terminology, which is in some cases compiled in cooperation with national authorities. Finally, the contribution of all EU agencies, coordinated by the Translation Centre, is extremely valuable.

The IATE database is managed by an inter-institutional team chaired in turn by one of the institutions which contribute to IATE and its funding. It is currently chaired by the Translation Centre, which houses the team responsible for the technical maintenance and improvement of the database.

TermCoord represents DG TRAD and the European Parliament in the IATE Management Group. The latter puts in place task forces and working groups in order to constantly improve the content, interface and functions of IATE.

== Proactive terminology and documentation ==
In 2011, in collaboration with the Development and Application Service, TermCoord introduced the "Glossary Links" tool to enable users to search in its collection of glossaries by keyword, languages, source or category.

The database currently contains links to about 1800 multilingual, bilingual and monolingual glossaries and dictionaries publicly available online. The glossaries are categorised according to the various domains featured in parliamentary texts.

Another helpful resource is the DocHound page – a one-stop reference page with links to various document types used in EU institutions or their respective search pages, where translators can find all kinds of reference documents they might need for their translations.

== Terminology projects ==
As of July 2010, participating in a terminology project has become an integral part of translation traineeships in order to give trainees the opportunity to develop their terminology skills. All trainees work either on one of the ongoing thematic projects prepared and coordinated by TermCoord staff and trainees, or on a language-specific project run by the translation unit. Trainees are helped by their unit's terminologists who revise and validate their results, which are then inserted into IATE. The terminology projects encompass a wide range of topics which are constantly being adapted depending on current needs. So far, projects were carried out in areas such as human rights (the EP is responsible for this thematic area in IATE), financial markets, EP's Rules of Procedure, LGBT (Lesbian, Gay, Bisexual and Transgender) basic terms, IT terminology and term mining with the help of extraction tools.

== Seminars ==
TermCoord organises terminology-related seminars for translators, terminologists and interpreters from all EU institutions, under the comprehensive title 'Terminology in the Changing World of Translation'. These seminars regularly attract a large audience to the historic setting of the original European Parliament Chamber in Luxembourg. These seminars have so far dealt with terminology in legislative procedures, computer-assisted translation, terminology management, lexicography and e-lexicography, neologisms in the digital age and legal translation.

== External contacts and presentations ==
Terminology is a dynamically evolving discipline of our age that has gained more and more importance over the last few decades. TermCoord believes that it is very important to stay up-to-date with the evolution of terminology science and practice, and to connect with the actors of this discipline in order to exchange valuable expertise and terminology material, which can be shared with EP translators.

For this purpose TermCoord keeps in contact with a large number of universities, terminology bodies and experts through its public website, as well as through its memberships in important associations, such as the European Association for Terminology (EAFT), the International Information Centre for Terminology (Infoterm), the International Network for Terminology (TermNet) and the Rat für Deutschsprachige Terminologie (RaDT). TermCoord's Facebook page is another important means of communication.

Thanks to important academic contacts, TermCoord received different groups of university students and teachers for one-day visits, as well as researchers for longer Erasmus and study visits. Agnieszka Antosik wrote as a trainee her master's thesis on the role of terminology in the European Parliament, focusing on the way the unit coordinates terminology work (original title: "Rolle der Terminologiearbeit im Europäischen Parlament. Am Beispiel von TermCoord"). Another trainee, Agnieszka Andrzejewska, wrote an assignment on her traineeship in the Unit TermCoord has an important academic cooperation with Universities all over Europe. Since 2012, TermCoord cooperates with terminology or language departments of universities on terminology projects for feeding IATE. It started as a pilot project with four universities (from Bulgaria, Belgium and Latvia) which teach terminology in the framework of a master's course. The students work on terminology projects, following the requirements for IATE terminology work and the respective guidelines, researching and documenting terms in a main source language (English or French) and a target language of their choice (among the official languages of the EU). The results having been very positive and TermCoord is willing to cooperate with other interested university departments. The Terminology Coordination Unit also has an academic cooperation with the University of Luxembourg and the University of Mons.

Furthermore, TermCoord has participated in several conferences and has given presentations on different aspects of terminology and IATE work carried out within the EP and the other EU institutions. Among others, a presentation was given about terminology consolidation in IATE in the EU institutions at the JIAMCATT conference in Turin; another about terminology work at the European Parliament at the 8th International Conference of the Greek Society on Terminology in Athens; and also a talk about the terminology and information sharing tools used in EU institutions at the Terminology and Knowledge Engineering Conference (TEK 2012) in Madrid and at the JIAMCATT conference in Luxembourg.

== Communication ==
TermCoord uses various means of communication both to keep the terminologists and translators of Parliament up to date and to facilitate the cooperation within the EP and between the Institutions mentioned above. Besides e-mail exchanges and meetings (both in person and through videoconferences), the internal websites are used extensively as important channels of communication. The need for a public website arose from TermCoord's wide-ranging contacts with universities and terminology bodies worldwide, since the EU institutional websites are only accessible on internal networks. TermCoord regularly publish posts on current issues related to terminology and provide a wide range of useful information, material and resources related to terminology and translation in order to facilitate translators' and terminologists' work. Both websites are used for publishing material from seminars, workshops and training sessions, as well as links to important terminology databanks and other terminology-related sites. Furthermore, the websites contain a number of other interesting items such as terminology and translation book reviews, information about international linguistics conferences, information about traineeships and study visits within the Parliament and theses on terminology.

== Awareness campaigns, newsletter, brochures ==
Every year, a campaign is launched in order to raise awareness among translators about the importance of and latest developments in terminology. 2012 campaign promoted the training possibilities offered by the unit to translators, terminologists and trainees, while the 2013 campaign encourages translators to participate more actively in terminology work and in enriching IATE. An outline of the Unit's principal activities is published in a quarterly newsletter for the information of colleagues in the Parliament and in the other EU institutions. Furthermore, a brochure published by DG TRAD promotes the IATE database and the significance of terminological consistency for accurate legislative drafting and good quality translations by presenting a selection of terms from the human rights domain, which is the responsibility of the European Parliament within IATE. If you want to find out more about TermCoord you can download TermCoord's booklet which was created in order to present the Unit ´s activities to external parties that are active in a related field.

== Credits ==
TermCoord was among the top 25 Language Lovers 2013 blogs in the category 'Language Professionals'. This category focuses on blogs maintained by people using languages in their profession, such as translators, interpreters and localization specialists.
