= Christos Ellinides =

European civil servant

Christos Ellinides CEng
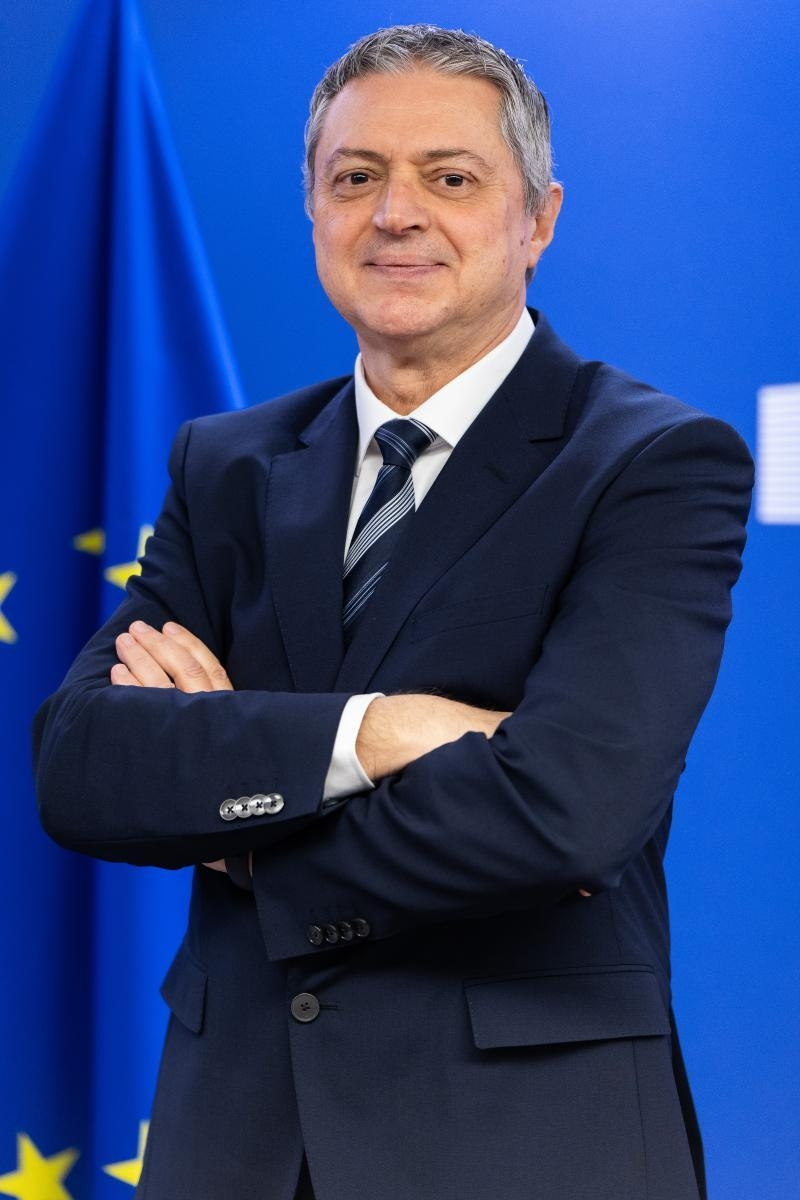
- Official portrait, 2024

Director-General for Translation
- Incumbent
- Assumed office 1 December 2023 (Acting: March 2022 - November 2023)
- Preceded by: Rytis Martikonis
- Commission: Von der Leyen I and II

Personal details
- Citizenship: Cyprus
- Education: Nova Southeastern University (BSc); City University, London (MSc)
- Occupation: European civil servant
- Profession: Engineer

Christos Ellinides is a European civil servant of Cypriot nationality who has served as Director-General of the Directorate-General for Translation (DGT) at the European Commission since March 2022. He is an engineer and information technology expert.

Christos Ellinides graduated cum laude in computer science and business administration from Nova University in Miami, before completing a Master of Science in Systems Analysis and Design at City University, London. He is a Chartered Engineer, registered with the UK's Engineering Council.

Ellinides had an extensive career in the private sector prior to joining the European institutions. He worked as an engineer in Cyprus for companies and in business administration, including for Mercedes Benz. In 1998, he joined the Cyprus Airways Group, becoming Chief Information Officer in 2000. During this period, Ellinides also lectured at the Higher Technical Institute of Cyprus and the European University of Cyprus.

In 2006, Ellinides joined the European Commission, working in digital infrastructure solutions for DG DIGIT. He moved to DGT, another internal service, in 2014 holding the rank of Deputy Director-General, before becoming Director-General - in an acting capacity from 2022 onwards and formally instated within the role from December 2023.

Ellinides is seeking to promote DGT's mission as a provider of high-quality translation and other language services to facilitate further multilingual communication in Europe and ensure information accessibility for all European citizens across EU member states. His term has also witnessed the integration of AI as part of digital transformation, with the arrival of machine translation within the professional sphere. Ellinides has stated that demand for human translation and machine translation has been increasing simultaneously in the past few years.

He also serves as chairman of the management board of the Translation Centre for the Bodies of the European Union.

Alongside his native Greek, Ellinides is fluent in English and French.
