= Spreadthesign =

Multilingual sign language dictionary

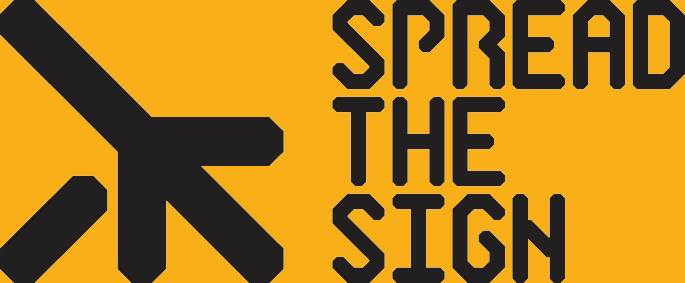
- Company type: Dictionary
- Founded: 2006
- Founder: Thomas Lydell
- Headquarters: Örebro, Sweden
- Area served: Worldwide
- Key people: Thomas Lydell (Founder); Sofia Wikström (Production Assistant); Mikael Sundberg (Photographer)
- Services: Multilingual sign language dictionaries
- Total assets: 610,000+ signed videos
- Number of employees: 2, and about 50 volunteers
- Parent: European Sign Language Centre
- Website: www.spreadthesign.com

Spreadthesign is an online multilingual sign languages dictionary. Searching for words and sentences provides the corresponding signs within the target sign language. Spreadthesign is available as a free access learning tool both as a website and an app. The project is largely supported by public institutions, public funding and public partnerships, universities and academics. Produced contents and software are published under proprietary licences.

== History ==
The project was initiated in 2006 with only six sign languages represented. Spreadthesign is managed by the Non-governmental organization European Sign Language Centre in Örebro, Sweden. The organization is financed by funds through different projects and a lot of the work is supported by volunteers. Today there are more than 610,000 videos in the database of Spreadthesign and the work to expand the number of videos and sign languages is an ongoing process.

At the inauguration at the Ministry for Foreign Affairs (Sweden) on March 31, 2009, several Swedish dignitaries were present. Among them were Queen Silvia of Sweden, the Minister of Education Jan Björklund and the minister of culture Lena Adelsohn Liljeroth.

During the period 2016–2018, extensive work has been done to heighten the quality of the dictionary.

== Supported languages ==
The sign languages represented in Spreadthesign are American Sign Language (ASL), Austrian Sign Language (ÖGS), Belarusian Sign Language, Brazilian Sign Language (LIBRAS), British Sign Language (BSL), Chilean Sign Language (LSCH), Cuban Sign Language, Cypriot Sign Language, Bulgarian Sign Language, Chinese Sign Language (CSL), Croatian Sign Language, (HZJ) Czech Sign Language, Estonian Sign Language (ESL), Finnish Sign Language, French Sign Language (LSF), German Sign Language (DGS), Greek Sign Language, Icelandic Sign Language, Indian Sign Language, International Sign (IS), Italian Sign Language (LIS), Japanese Sign Language (JSL), Latvian Sign Language, Lithuanian Sign Language (LGK), Mexican Sign Language (LSM), Polish Sign Language (PJM), Portuguese Sign Language, Romanian Sign Language, Russian Sign Language, Spanish Sign Language (LSE), Swedish Sign Language (SSL), Turkish Sign Language (TİD), Ukrainian Sign Language (USL) and Pakistan Sign Language (PSL).

The written languages represented in Spreadthesign are American English, Belarusian, British English, Bulgarian, Chinese, Croatian, Czech, English (India), Estonian, Finnish, French, German (Austria), German (Germany), Greek (Cyprus), Greek (Greece), Hindi, Icelandic, Italian, Japanese, Latvian, Lithuanian, Polish, Portuguese (Brazil), Portuguese (Portugal), Romanian, Russian (Belarus), Russian (Russia), Spanish (Chile), Spanish (Cuba), Spanish (Mexico), Spanish (Spain), Swedish, Turkish, Ukrainian, Urdu (Pakistan).

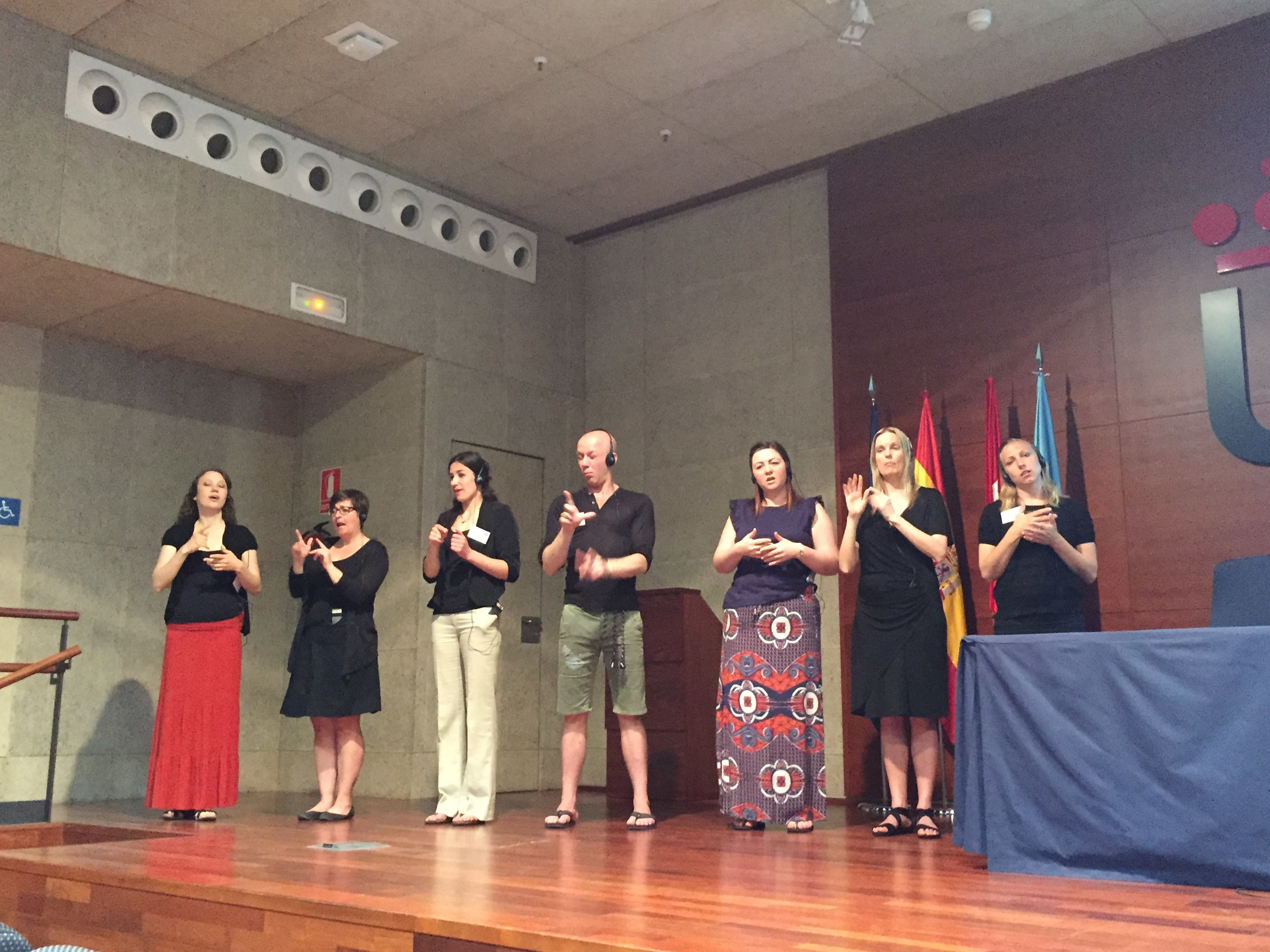
Sign language interpreters from different countries during a project meeting with Spreadthesign in 2015 at the Universidad Rey Juan Carlos.

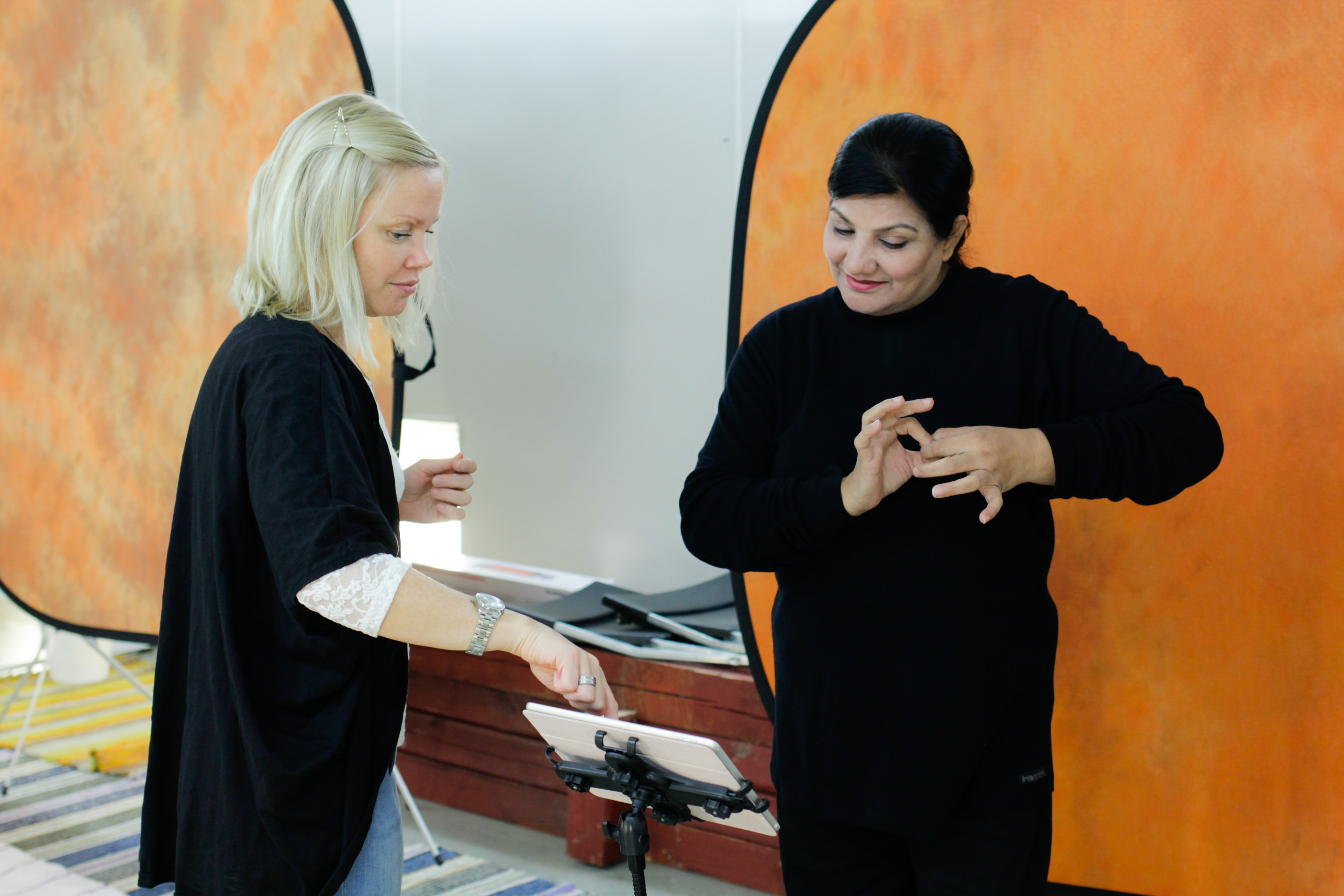
Sofia Wikström, one of the key people in Spreadthesign working in the studio with the actor Ms. Rubina Tayyab from Pakistan.

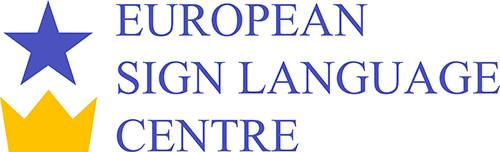
Logotype for the European Sign Language Centre, the non-profit association that manages Spreadthesign.

== See also ==
- Lingua Libre and its sign languages recording project
