= Ildikó Horváth =

European civil servant

- Education: University of Szeged; University of Montpellier Paul Valéry; University of Pécs
- Occupations: European civil servant, academic
- Known for: Deputy Director-General for Translation at the Directorate-General for Translation; Director of the Translation Centre for the Bodies of the European Union

Ildikó Horváth is a European civil servant of Hungarian nationality who has served as Deputy Director-General for Translation at the Directorate-General for Translation at the European Commission since 16 January 2026. She has also served as Director of the Translation Centre for the Bodies of the European Union since 2022.

Ildikó Horváth is an academic, specialised in translation studies and linguistics. She graduated from the University of Szeged with a master's degree in English language and literature in 1995 and a master's degree in French language and literature in 1996. This qualification enabled her to teach in secondary schools, which Horváth did in Budapest. In 1997, Horváth obtained a Diplôme d'études approfondies (DEA) in applied linguistics from the University of Montpellier Paul Valéry.

In 1998, Horváth joined Eötvös Loránd University as a translator, specialised in social sciences and economics, and interpreter for conferences. In 2007, Horváth obtained a PhD in translation studies and applied linguistics from the University of Pécs. In 2016, she obtained her habilitation from Eötvös Lorand. She had already returned to Eötvös Loránd in 2013 as an associate professor in the Faculty of Humanities and, from 2019, served as Director of the Institute of Language Mediation. In 2022, she was appointed Vice Dean for International Affairs.
