= Languages of the European Union =

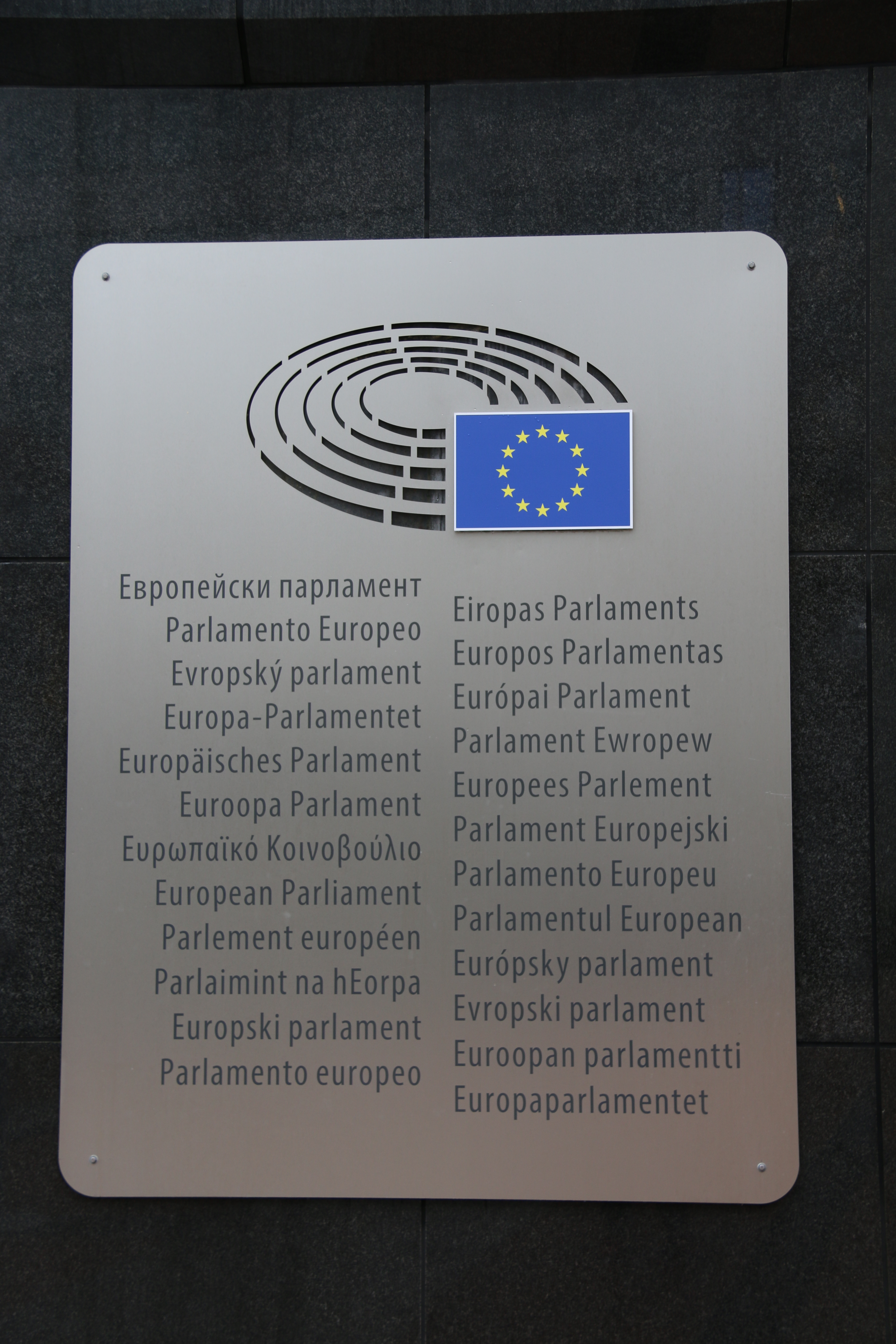
- Multilingual sign in the European Parliament
- Official: Bulgarian; Croatian; Czech; Danish; Dutch; English; Estonian; Finnish; French; German; Greek; Hungarian; Irish; Italian; Latvian; Lithuanian; Maltese; Polish; Portuguese; Romanian; Slovak; Slovene; Spanish; Swedish
- Regional: Russian, Lombard, Luxembourgish, Turkish, Gallo-Picene, Aragonese, Silesian, Istriot, Sami languages, Basque, Karaim, West Frisian, East Frisian, Catalan, Ligurian, Galician, Norman, Gallo, Picard, Walloon, Frainc-Comtou, Poitevin-Saintongeais, Champenois, Lorrain, Breton, Romani, Kashubian, Albanian, Emilian, Romagnol, Friulian, Serbian, Extreme Southerner, Ladin, Rusyn, Upper Sorbian, Tuscan, Livonian, Aromanian, Istro-Romanian, Lower Sorbian, Ukrainian, Belarusian, Neapolitan, Occitan, Arpitan, Corsican, Asturleonese, Sardinian, Wymysorys
- Immigrant: Arabic, Armenian, Chinese, Berber languages, Kurdish, Hebrew
- Signed: Many sign languages, in the French Sign Language family, German Sign Language family and Swedish Sign Language family; also the Maltese Sign Language
- Keyboard layout: QWERTY, QWERTZ, AZERTY, Bulgarian, Greek

The European Union (EU) has 24 official languages, of which the three most natively spoken ones are German, French and Italian. Previously, English, French and German were considered "procedural" languages, but this notion was abandoned by the European Commission, whereas the European Parliament accepts all official languages as working languages. Today, English and French are used in the day-to-day workings of the institutions of the EU. Institutions have the right to define the linguistic regime of their working, but the Commission and a number of other institutions have not done so, as indicated by several judicial rulings.

The EU asserts that it is in favour of linguistic diversity. This principle is enshrined in Article 22 of the Charter of Fundamental Rights (art. 22) and in the Treaty on European Union (art. 3(3) TEU). In the EU, language policy is the responsibility of member states, and the EU does not have a common language policy; EU institutions play a supporting role in this field, based on the principle of "subsidiarity"; they promote a European dimension in the member states' language policies. The EU encourages all its citizens to be multilingual; specifically, it encourages them to be able to speak two languages in addition to their native language. Though the EU has very limited influence in this area, as the content of educational systems is the responsibility of individual member states, a number of EU funding programmes actively promote language learning and linguistic diversity.

All 24 official languages of the EU are accepted as working languages, but in practice only three – English, French, and German – are in wide general use in its institutions, and of these, English is the most commonly used. The most widely understood language in the EU is English, which is understood by 44% of all adults, while German is the most widely used mother tongue, spoken by 18%. French is an official language in all three of the cities that are political centres of the EU: Brussels, Strasbourg, and Luxembourg City. Since the exit of the United Kingdom from the EU in 2020, the government of France has encouraged greater use of French as a working language.

Luxembourgish and Turkish, which have official status in Luxembourg and Cyprus, respectively, are the only two official languages of EU member states that are not official languages of the EU. In 2023, the Spanish government requested that its co-official languages Catalan, Basque, and Galician be added to the official languages of the EU.

== Official EU languages ==
As of 30 July 2023, the official languages of the European Union, as stipulated in the latest amendment of Regulation No 1 determining the languages to be used by the European Economic Community of 1958, are:

Language	Official in (de jure or de facto)		Since
Language	At national level	At subnational level	Since
Bulgarian	Bulgaria		2007
Croatian	Croatia	Austria (Note: Co-official status in certain municipalities in the State of Burgenland); Hungary (Note: Region of Transdanubia.); Italy (Note: Region of Molise.)	2013
Czech	Czechia	Slovakia (Note: Co-official status in the municipalities in which the size of the minority population meets the legal threshold of 20%.)	2004
Danish	Denmark	Germany (Note: State of Schleswig-Holstein)	1973
Dutch	Belgium; Netherlands		1958
English	Ireland; Malta; United Kingdom (until 31 December 2020)		1973
Estonian	Estonia		2004
Finnish	Finland		1995
French	Belgium; France; Luxembourg	Italy (Note: Region of Aosta Valley)	1958
German	Austria; Belgium; Germany; Luxembourg	Denmark (Note: Region of Southern Jutland); Italy (Note: Province of South Tyrol); Poland (Note: 22 gminas in Opole Voivodeship)	1958
Greek	Cyprus; Greece		1981
Hungarian	Hungary	Austria; Romania; Slovakia; Slovenia (Note: Co-official in certain municipalities in the region of Prekmurje); Croatia (Note: Region of Osijek-Baranja County.)	2004
Irish	Ireland		2007
Italian	Italy	Croatia (Note: in Istria County); Slovenia (Note: Co-official in certain municipalities in the region of Slovenian Istria)	1958
Latvian	Latvia		2004
Lithuanian	Lithuania	Poland (Note: Gmina Puńsk in Podlaskie Voivodeship)	2004
Maltese	Malta		2004
Polish	Poland		2004
Portuguese	Portugal		1986
Romanian	Romania		2007
Slovak	Slovakia		2004
Slovene	Slovenia	Austria (Note: Co-official status in certain municipalities in the State of Carinthia); Hungary (Note: County of Vas); Italy (Note: Region of Friuli-Venezia Giulia)	2004
Spanish	Spain		1986
Swedish	Finland; Sweden		1995

Official language proposal
Language	Official in (de jure or de facto)	Since
Language	At subnational level	Since
Catalan	Andorra Spain France Italy	2023
Basque	Spain France	2023
Galician	Spain	2023

The number of member states (27) exceeds the number of official languages (24), as three member states (Austria, Belgium and Luxembourg) did not have a distinct national official language when they joined the EEC, but rather shared their closest neighbours': Austria's was (and still is) German; Belgium's were (and still are) Dutch, French and German; and Luxembourg's were French and German. Luxembourgish became a national official language of Luxembourg in 1984 (decades after the country joined the European Communities as a founding member). Despite this, Luxembourg has not since requested its designation as an EU official language. Cyprus has two official languages, Greek and Turkish, but only Greek is an official language of the EU, shared by Greece. Conversely, the United Kingdom withdrew from the EU in 2020, but the English language remains as it is official in Ireland (besides Irish) and in Malta (besides Maltese). Therefore, 23 of the 27 EU states have 24 official languages, and the remaining 4 do not contribute any additional official languages.

Several national languages are shared by two or more countries in the EU. Dutch, English, French, German, Greek, and Swedish are all official languages at the national level in multiple countries (see table above). In addition, Croatian, Czech, Danish, Hungarian, Italian, Slovak, and Slovene are official languages in multiple EU countries at the regional level.

Furthermore, not all national languages have been accorded the status of official EU languages. These include Luxembourgish, an official language of Luxembourg since 1984, and Turkish, an official language of Cyprus.

All languages of the EU are also working languages. Documents which a member state or a person subject to the jurisdiction of a member state sends to institutions of the Community may be drafted in any one of the official languages selected by the sender. The reply is drafted in the same language. Regulations and other documents of general application are drafted in the twenty-four official languages. The Official Journal of the European Union is published in the twenty-four official languages.

Documents of major public importance or interest are produced in all official languages, but that accounts for a minority of the institutions′ work. Other documents—e.g., communications with the national authorities, decisions addressed to particular individuals or entities and correspondence—are translated only into the languages needed. For internal purposes the EU institutions are allowed by law to choose their own language arrangements. The European Commission, for example, conducts its internal business in three languages, English, French, and German (sometimes called "procedural languages"), and goes fully multilingual only for public information and communication purposes. The European Parliament, on the other hand, has members who need working documents in their own languages, so its document flow is fully multilingual from the outset. Non-institutional EU bodies are not legally obliged to make language arrangement for all the 24 languages

The translations are expensive. According to the EU's English-language website, the cost of maintaining the institutions’ policy of multilingualism—i.e., the cost of translation and interpretation—was €1,123 million in 2005, which is 1% of the annual general budget of the EU, or €2.28 per person per year. The EU Parliament has made clear that its member states have autonomy for language education, which by treaty the Union must respect.

=== Language families ===
Language family tree of EU official languages

The vast majority of the 24 official EU languages belong to the Indo-European family: the three dominant subfamilies are the Germanic, Romance, and Slavic. Germanic languages are primarily spoken in central and northern Europe and include Danish, Dutch, English, German, and Swedish. Romance languages are mostly spoken in western and southern European regions; they include French, Italian, Portuguese, Romanian, and Spanish. The Slavic languages are predominantly found in central Europe and the Balkans in southeastern Europe; they include Bulgarian, Croatian, Czech, Polish, Slovak, and Slovene. The Baltic languages, Latvian and Lithuanian; the Celtic languages, including Irish; and Greek are also Indo-European.

Outside the Indo-European family, Estonian, Finnish, and Hungarian are Uralic languages, while Maltese is the only Afroasiatic language with official status in the EU.

=== Writing systems ===
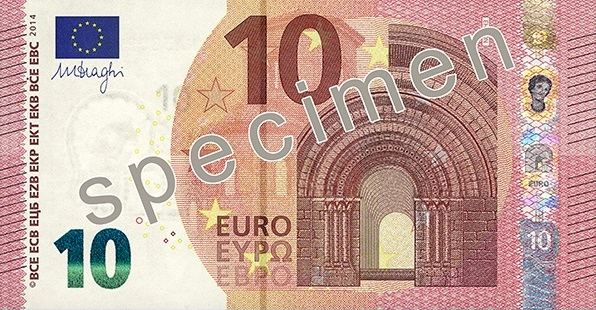
10 euro note from the Europa series written in Latin and Greek alphabets (EURO and ΕΥΡΩ, respectively), and also in the Cyrillic alphabet (ЕВРО), as a result of Bulgaria joining the European Union in 2007

Most official EU languages are written in the Latin script. The two exceptions are Greek, which is written in the Greek script, and Bulgarian, which is written in Cyrillic script. With the accession of Bulgaria to the European Union on 1 January 2007, Cyrillic became the third official script of the European Union, following the Latin and Greek scripts. The original design of euro banknotes had the word euro written in both Latin (Euro) and Greek (Ευρώ) letters; the Cyrillic spelling (Eвро) was added to the new Europa series of banknotes starting in 2013 (see Linguistic issues concerning the euro).

=== Language-specific regulations ===
English

After the United Kingdom's withrawal from the EU the number of native English speakers among EU citizens fell from approximately 13% to just 1%. This dramatic demographic shift created a paradox: English lost its primary native base within the Union, yet it has remained — and arguably consolidated itself as — the dominant working language of EU institutions.

This event consolidated a preexistent phenomenon: the emergence of recurrent linguistic features, lexical, grammatical, and pragmatic, in the English used within European institutional and professional contexts, shaped by contact with other European languages and by the relative absence of native-speaker normative pressure. This concept is called Euro-English.

==== Maltese ====
Although Maltese is an official language, the Council set a transitional period of three years from 1 May 2004, during which the institutions were not obliged to draft all acts in Maltese. It was agreed that the council could extend this transitional period by an additional year, but decided not to. All new acts of the institutions were required to be adopted and published in Maltese from 30 April 2007.

==== Irish ====
Irish previously had the status of "treaty language" before being upgraded to an official and working language in 2007. However, a temporary derogation was enforced until 1 January 2022. The designation of Irish as a "treaty language" meant that only the treaties of the European Union were translated into Irish, whereas Legal Acts of the European Union adopted under the treaties (like Directives and Regulations) did not have to be.

When Ireland joined the European Communities (now the EU) in 1973, Irish was accorded "Treaty Language" status. This meant that the founding EU Treaty was restated in Irish. Irish was also listed in that treaty and all subsequent EU treaties as one of the authentic languages of the treaties. As a Treaty Language, Irish was an official procedural language of the Court of Justice of the European Union. It was also possible to correspond in written Irish with the EU Institutions.

However, despite being the first official language of Ireland and having been accorded minority-language status in the Northern Ireland region of the United Kingdom, then an EU member state, Irish was not made an official working language of the EU until 1 January 2007. On that date an EU Council Regulation making Irish an official working language of the EU came into effect. This followed a unanimous decision on 13 June 2005 by EU foreign ministers that Irish would be made the 21st official language of the EU. However, a derogation previously stipulated that not all documents have to be translated into Irish as is the case with the other official languages.

The regulation meant that legislation adopted by both the European Parliament and the Council of Ministers is translated into Irish, and interpretation from Irish was available at European Parliament plenary sessions and some Council meetings. The cost of translation, interpretation, publication, and legal services involved in making Irish an official EU language was estimated at just under €3.5 million a year. On 3 December 2015, a new regulation passed by the council had set a definitive schedule on the gradual reduction of the derogation of the Irish language. This regulation outlined a schedule of gradual reduction spread across five years starting from 2016. The derogation was ultimately revoked on 1 January 2022, making Irish a fully recognised EU language for the first time in the state's history.

Irish is the only official language of the EU that is not the most widely spoken language in any member state. According to the 2006 Irish census figures, there are 1.66 million people in Ireland with some ability to speak Irish, out of a population of 4.6 million, though only 538,500 use Irish on a daily basis (counting those who use it mainly in the education system) and just over 72,000 use Irish as a daily language outside the education system.

==== South-Slavic language status ====
At the time of Croatia's accession to the EU, some diplomats and officials suggested that, rather than accepting the Croatian written standard as an official EU language, the EU should instead adopt a single unified literary form that would encompass several nearly-identical written standards of the same language, historically known as Serbo-Croatian, the official language of Yugoslavia until its disintegration and the division of the language among ethnic lines. In addition to Croatian, this would include the Serbian, Bosnian, and Montenegrin written standards, all of them based in the same spoken dialect of Eastern Herzegovina, with the goal of reducing potential translation and interpretation costs if the other Western Balkan states eventually joined the EU as well. The International Criminal Tribunal for the former Yugoslavia was cited as an example of an international body that had conducted business in such a unified standard. In negotiations with Croatia, however, it was agreed that the Croatian standard would become a separate official EU language, as none of the other states at issue had yet been admitted to the EU.

== Regional, minority and other languages ==
Some regional or minority languages spoken within the EU do not have official recognition at EU level. Some of them may have some official status within the member state and count many more speakers than some of the lesser-used official languages. The official languages of EU are in bold.

In the list, language varieties classified as dialects of an official language by member countries are not included. However, many of these varieties may be viewed as separate languages: for instance, Scots (the Germanic language descended from Old English, not the Celtic language known as Scottish Gaelic) and several Romance languages spoken in Spain, Portugal, France and Italy, such as Aragonese, Asturian, Mirandese, Lombard, Ligurian, Piedmontese, Venetian, Corsican, Neapolitan and Sicilian.

=== Languages of France ===
The French constitution stipulates French as the sole language of France. Since the 2008 modifications, article 75-1 of the Constitution adds that "regional languages form part of the French heritage".

Nevertheless, there exist a number of languages spoken by sizable minorities, such as Breton (a Celtic language), Basque, and several Romance languages such as Occitan, Catalan, Corsican and the various langues d'oïl (other than French), as well as Germanic languages spoken in Alsace-Lorraine (Central Franconian, High Franconian, Luxembourgish, and Alemannic) and French Flanders (Dutch).

These languages enjoy no official status under the French state, and regions are not permitted to bestow any such status themselves.

=== Languages of Greece ===
The official language of Greece is Greek, and recognized minority languages are Armenian, Ladino and Turkish. Nevertheless, there are several other languages in Greece, which lack any recognition. These are Albanian, Aromanian, Megleno-Romanian (these last two usually being collectively known as "Vlach"), Romani and the Slavic varieties spoken in the country. Greek scholar and National and Kapodistrian University of Athens emerita professor Bessie Dendrinos described Greece as the only European Union member state sticking to a "linguistic assimilationist ideology".

=== Languages of Italy ===
Italy's official language is Italian, although twelve additional languages (namely Albanian, Catalan, German, Greek, Slovene, Croatian, French, Franco-Provençal, Friulian, Ladin, Occitan and Sardinian) have been recognized as minority languages by the 1999 national Framework Law on the Country's historical linguistic minorities, in accordance with the Article 6 of the Italian Constitution. However, many languages other than Italian and the above-mentioned twelve are spoken across the country, most of them being either Gallo-Italic or Italo-Dalmatian, which lack any sort of official recognition and protection.

=== Languages of Spain ===
The Spanish governments have sought to give some official status in the EU for the languages of the autonomous communities of Spain, Catalan/Valencian, Galician and Basque. The 667th Council Meeting of the Council of the European Union in Luxembourg on 13 June 2005, decided to authorise limited use at EU level of languages recognised by member states other than the official working languages. The Council granted recognition to "languages other than the languages referred to in Council Regulation No 1/1958 whose status is recognised by the Constitution of a Member State on all or part of its territory or the use of which as a national language is authorised by law." The official use of such languages will be authorised on the basis of an administrative arrangement concluded between the council and the requesting member state.

Although Basque, Catalan/Valencian and Galician are not nationwide official languages in Spain, as co-official languages in the respective regions—pursuant to Spanish constitution, among other documents—they are eligible to benefit from official use in EU institutions under the terms of 13 June 2005 resolution of the Council of the European Union. The Spanish government has assented to the provisions in respect of these languages.

The status of Catalan, spoken by over 9 million EU citizens (just over 1.8% of the total), has been the subject of particular debate. On 11 December 1990, the use of Catalan was the subject of a European Parliament Resolution (resolution A3-169/90 on languages in the [European] Community and the situation of Catalan).

On 16 November 2005, the President Peter Straub of the Committee of the Regions signed an agreement with the Spanish Ambassador to the EU, Carlos Bastarreche, approving the use of Spanish regional languages in an EU institution for the first time in a meeting on that day, with interpretation provided by European Commission interpreters.

On 3 July 2006, the European Parliament's Bureau approved a proposal by the Spanish State to allow citizens to address the European Parliament in Basque, Catalan/Valencian and Galician, two months after its initial rejection.

On 30 November 2006, the European Ombudsman, Nikiforos Diamandouros, and the Spanish ambassador in the EU, Carlos Bastarreche, signed an agreement in Brussels to allow Spanish citizens to address complaints to the European Ombudsman in Basque, Catalan/Valencian and Galician, all three co-official languages in Spain. According to the agreement, a translation body, which will be set up and financed by the Spanish government, will be responsible for translating complaints submitted in these languages. In turn, it will translate the Ombudsman's decisions from Spanish into the language of the complainant. Until such a body is established the agreement will not become effective.

Following the 2023 Spanish general election, the PSOE-led Spanish government sent a letter to the rotating Presidency of the Council of the European Union, asking for Catalan, Basque, and Galician to be added to the current 24 official languages of the EU. This was done in exchange for the support of the Catalan pro independence party Junts for Francina Armengol's candidacy for President of the Congress of Deputies. Without such support the PSOE would likely have been unable to form a new government and a second election would have been held in the same year.

Galician in particular, not being itself a European Parliament official language, can be used and is in fact used by some European Parliament constituents as a spoken dialect of Portuguese due to its similarity with this language.

=== Luxembourgish and Turkish ===
Luxembourgish (Luxembourg) and Turkish (Cyprus) are the only two national languages that are not official languages of the EU. Neither Luxembourg nor Cyprus have yet used the provision of 13 June 2005 resolution to benefit from use in official EU institutions. On 26 February 2016 it was made public that Cyprus has asked to make Turkish an official EU language, in a “gesture” that could help reunification and improve EU–Turkey relations. Already in 2004, it was planned that Turkish would become an official language if Cyprus reunited. Turkish is also a recognized minority language in two EU member countries (Greece and Romania).

In September 2010, Luxembourg's foreign minister Jean Asselborn declined a request of the Alternative Democratic Reform Party (ADR) to make Luxembourgish an official language of the European Union citing financial reasons and also that German and French being already official languages would be sufficient for the needs of Luxembourg.

=== Romani ===
The Romani people, numbering over two million in the EU, speak the Romani language (actually numerous different languages), which is not official in any EU member state or polity, except for being an official minority language of Sweden and Finland. Moreover, Romani mass media and educational institution presences are near-negligible.

=== Russian ===
Russian is not an official language of the European Union, but is used by minorities and sizeable immigrant communities in some EU member states.

In March 2010 fact-sheets in Russian produced by the EU executive's offices in Latvia were withdrawn, provoking criticism from Plaid Cymru MEP and European Free Alliance group President Jill Evans who called European Commission to continue to provide information in non-official EU languages and commented that "it's disappointing to hear that the EU is bowing to pressure to exclude Russian speakers in the Baltic in this way".

=== Sami languages ===
In Finland, the Sami languages Northern Sami (ca. 2,000 speakers), Skolt Sami (400) and Inari Sami (300) have limited local recognition in certain municipalities of Finnish Lapland. Furthermore, legislation specifically concerning the Sami must be translated to these languages. Bilingualism with Finnish is universal, though.

At least five different Sami languages are spoken in Sweden, but "Sami language" (undifferentiated) is recognised as an official minority language in Sweden, and is co-official with Swedish in four municipalities in Norrbotten County (Swedish Lapland). Most of Sami speakers speak Northern Sami (5,000–6,000 speakers), although there are ca. 1,000–2,000 Lule Sami speakers and 600 Southern Sami speakers. Also Ume Sámi and Pite Sámi are spoken in Sweden.

=== Latin ===
For millennia, Latin served as a lingua franca for administrative, scholarly, religious, political, and other purposes in parts of the present-day European Union. After Athens and other Greek city-states of the 6th to 4th centuries BC, the first documented political entity historically verifiable in Europe was the Roman Republic, traditionally founded in 509 BC, the successor-state to the Etruscan city-state confederacies. Latin as a lingua franca of Europe was rivalled only by Greek. It is serving as honourable and ceremonial language in some of the oldest European universities in the 21st century, and has operated as the official language of the Roman Catholic Church to the present day. Latin, along with Greek, was at the core of education in Europe from the schools of rhetoric of the Roman Republic in all of its provinces and territories, through the medieval trivium and quadrivium, through the humanists and the Renaissance, all the way to Newton's Philosophiæ Naturalis Principia Mathematica (just to name one example of thousands of scientific works written in this language), to the public schools of all European countries, where Latin (along with Greek) was at the core of their curricula. Latin served as the undisputed European lingua franca until the 19th century, when the cultures of vernacular languages and the "national languages" started to gain ground and claim status. Today, several institutions of the European Union use Latin in their logos and domain names instead of listing their names in all the official languages. For example, the Court of Justice of the European Union has its website at "curia.europa.eu". The Court of Auditors uses Curia Rationum in its logo. The Council of the European Union has its website at "consilium.europa.eu" and its logo showing Consilium. The European Union itself has a Latin motto: "In varietate concordia". Under the European Company Regulation, companies can be incorporated as Societas Europaea (Latin for "European Company", often shortened to "SE" after the company's own proper name). Latin is one of the languages of IATE (the inter-institutional terminology database of the European Union).

=== Immigrant languages ===
A wide variety of languages from other parts of the world are spoken by immigrant communities in EU countries. Turkish (which is also an official language of the EU member Cyprus) is spoken as a first language by an estimated 1% of the population in Belgium and the western part of Germany, and by 1% in the Netherlands. Other widely used migrant languages include Berber languages which are spoken by about 1% of the population of both the Netherlands and Belgium and by many Berber migrants in France, Spain, Italy and Germany. Arabic is spoken in many EU countries mainly in its Maghrebi and Levantine varieties. Maghrebi Arabic is spoken by migrants in France, Italy, Spain, the Netherlands, Belgium and Germany. Levantine Arabic is spoken by migrants in Germany, France, Sweden, Denmark, Austria and Greece. Languages from former Yugoslavia (Serbian, Bosnian, Macedonian, Albanian, etc.) are spoken in many parts of the EU by migrants and refugees who have left the region as a result of the Yugoslav wars and unrest there.

There are large Chinese communities in France, Spain, Italy, and other countries. Old and recent Chinese migrants speak a number of Chinese varieties, in particular Cantonese and other southern Chinese varieties. However, Mandarin is becoming increasingly more prevalent due to the opening of the People's Republic of China.

There are many Russian-speaking immigrants in Germany and France. Vietnamese is one of the 14 recognized minority languages in the Czech Republic. (Note: Citizens belonging to minorities, which traditionally and on long-term basis live within the territory of the Czech Republic, enjoy the right to use their language in communication with authorities and in front of the courts of law The article 25 of the Czech Charter of Fundamental Rights and Basic Freedoms ensures right of the national and ethnic minorities for education and communication with authorities in their own language. Act No. 500/2004 Coll. (The Administrative Rule) in its paragraph 16 (4) (Procedural Language) ensures, that a citizen of the Czech Republic, who belongs to a national or an ethnic minority, which traditionally and on long-term basis lives within the territory of the Czech Republic, have right to address an administrative agency and proceed before it in the language of the minority. In the case that the administrative agency doesn't have an employee with knowledge of the language, the agency is bound to obtain a translator at the agency's own expense. According to Act No. 273/2001 (About The Rights of Members of Minorities) paragraph 9 (The right to use language of a national minority in dealing with authorities and in front of the courts of law) the same applies for the members of national minorities also in front of the courts of law.)

Many immigrant communities in the EU have been in place for several generations now, and their members are bilingual, at ease both in the local language and in that of their community.

=== Sign languages ===
A wide variety of sign languages are used in the EU, with around 500,000 people using a sign language as their first language. None of these languages are recognised as an official language of an EU member state, with the exception of Ireland passing the Irish Sign Language Act 2017 that granted it official status alongside Irish and English, and only three states (Austria, Finland and Portugal) refer to sign languages in their constitution.

Several NGOs exist which support signers, such as the European Union of the Deaf and the European Sign Language Centre. The European Commission has also supported some initiatives to produce digital technologies that can better support signers, such as Dicta-Sign and SignSpeak.

The sign languages in use in the EU are more difficult to classify into language families than the spoken languages, because of language contact and creolization. Important families include the Swedish, French, and German sign language families.

=== Esperanto ===
Esperanto is a constructed language that is part of the educational system in several member states. In Hungary it is officially recognised by the Ministry of Education as a foreign language; and examinations in Esperanto may be used to meet the requirements of knowledge of foreign languages needed to complete university or high school. Every year, since 2001, between 1000 and 3000 people have passed examinations in Esperanto, making up for a sum of more than 35,000 up to 2016; it is recognised by the Hungarian state. The Hungarian census 2001 found 4575 Esperanto speakers in Hungary (4407 of them learned the language, for 168 of them it is a family or native language); in 2011 it found 8397 Esperanto speakers. In 1990 there were only 2083 Esperanto speakers in Hungary following the census.

Esperanto is not mentioned by the EU Commission as an EU language; the Commission mentions only official, indigenous regional and minority languages as well as languages of immigrants. Following estimates there are approximately 100,000 Europeans sometimes using Esperanto (and several millions having learned Esperanto); the language has several thousand native speakers, some of them of the second or third generation.

The European party Europe – Democracy – Esperanto seeks to establish the planned language as an official second language in the EU in order to make international communication more efficient and fair in economical and philosophical terms. They are based on the conclusions of the Grin Report, which concluded that it would hypothetically allow savings to the EU of €25 billion a year (€54 for every citizen) and have other benefits. However, the EU Parliament has stated clearly that language education is the responsibility of member states.

The European Esperanto Union also promotes Esperanto as the international auxiliary language of Europe.

== Knowledge ==
The main official sources of information on the EU citizens' levels of language proficiency are the Special Eurobarometers no. 243 (February 2006; field work late 2005), no. 386 (2012), and no. 540 (2023).

Languages, by speakers as percentage of EU population as of October 2023
Official languages	First language	Additional language	Total
English	2%	47%	50%
German	19%	10%	29%
French	15%	11%	25%
Spanish	9%	7%	17%
Italian	13%	3%	16%
Polish	9%	0%	9%
Dutch	5%	1%	6%
Romanian	4%	1%	5%
Greek	3%	0%	3%
Hungarian	3%	0%	3%
Portuguese	3%	0%	3%
Czech	2%	1%	3%
Bulgarian	2%	0%	3%
Swedish	2%	1%	3%
Danish	1%	0%	2%
Slovak	1%	1%	2%
Finnish	1%	0%	1%
Croatian	1%	1%	1%
Lithuanian	1%	0%	1%
Slovenian	1%	0%	1%
Latvian	0%	0%	0%
Estonian	0%	0%	0%
Maltese	0%	0%	0%
Irish	0%	0%	0%

Non-official languages	First language	Additional language	Total
Russian	1%	3%	4%
Catalan (s)	1%	1%	3%
Turkish	1%	0%	1%
Arabic	0%	0%	1%
Galician (s)	0%	0%	1%
Chinese	0%	0%	1%
Luxembourgish	0%	0%	0%
Albanian	0%	0%	0%
Low German	0%	0%	0%
Frisian	0%	0%	0%
Kurdish	0%	0%	0%
Basque	0%	0%	0%
Sámi	0%	0%	0%
Sardinian	0%	0%	0%
Ukrainian	0%	0%	0%
Yiddish	0%	0%	0%
Japanese	0%	0%	0%
Friulia	0%	0%	0%
Occitan	0%	0%	0%
Romani	0%	0%	0%
Serbian/Bosnian/Montenegrin	0%	0%	0%
Other	0%	0%	0%

According to the Special Eurobarometer no. 540, as of 2023, the five most spoken languages in the EU were English (50%), German (29%), French (25%), Spanish (17%) and Italian (16%). At 19% of the total number of speakers, German was the most widely spoken native language, followed by French (15%), Italian (13%) Polish (9%) and Spanish (9%). The knowledge of foreign languages varied considerably in the specific countries, as the table below shows. The most spoken second or foreign languages in the EU were English, French, German, Spanish, and Italian. In the table, boxes coloured light blue mean that the language is an official language of the country, while the main language spoken in the country is coloured dark blue.

Knowledge of English (2012)

Knowledge of German (2012)

Knowledge of French (2012) (Note: Around 40% of Belgium's population are native French speakers.)

Knowledge of Italian (2012)

Knowledge of Spanish (2012)

Knowledge of Russian (2012) (Note: 37.5% of Latvia's population and about 30% of Estonia's population are native Russian speakers.)

Knowledge of languages in EU27 (2023)
Country	English	German	French	Spanish	Italian	Polish	Russian
European Union (total)	50%	29%	25%	17%	16%	9%	4%
Austria	59%	98%	11%	4%	9%	0%	1%
Belgium^{1}	61%	18%	83%	10%	7%	1%	2%
Bulgaria	30%	5%	3%	3%	1%	0%	14%
Croatia	45%	15%	4%	1%	8%	0%	1%
Cyprus	80%	7%	9%	1%	3%	0%	5%
Czech Republic	43%	20%	5%	3%	2%	4%	15%
Denmark	90%	50%	11%	9%	1%	0%	0%
Estonia	59%	14%	2%	2%	1%	1%	74%^{2}
Finland	82%	19%	4%	4%	2%	0%	4%
France	42%	6%	97%	14%	5%	0%	1%
Germany	66%	98%	16%	8%	4%	2%	4%
Greece	52%	7%	6%	2%	3%	0%	2%
Hungary	31%	13%	2%	2%	2%	0%	2%
Ireland	97%	7%	13%	7%	2%	3%	1%
Italy	34%	4%	10%	6%	97%	0%	1%
Latvia	55%	18%	3%	2%	1%	3%	91%^{3}
Lithuania	45%	12%	3%	1%	1%	14%	66%
Luxembourg	71%	66%	94%	15%	10%	1%	1%
Malta	91%	4%	13%	4%	52%	0%	1%
Netherlands	95%	61%	27%	9%	1%	0%	0%
Poland	31%	5%	1%	1%	1%	97%	5%
Portugal	42%	1%	13%	9%	1%	0%	1%
Romania	27%	3%	7%	3%	3%	0%	1%
Slovakia	40%	21%	2%	2%	2%	2%	15%
Slovenia	62%	33%	2%	4%	13%	0%	2%
Spain	39%	3%	13%	97%	4%	0%	0%
Sweden	91%	25%	12%	10%	3%	1%	1%

1 39% of those who speak French are native speakers, for a total of 83%.
2 Includes 25% native speakers
3 Includes 28% native speakers

59% of EU citizens are able to hold a conversation in a language other than their native language, three percent higher than reported in 2012. 28% are able to hold a conversation in at least two foreign languages, 11% are able to hold a conversation in at least three foreign languages, while 39% are only able to speak their native language.

English remains by far the most widely spoken foreign language throughout Europe. A total of 95% of students in the EU study English at secondary level and 38% of EU citizens state that they have sufficient skills in English to have a conversation (excluding citizens of Ireland, an English-speaking country). A total of 28% of Europeans indicate that they know either French (14%) or German (14%), along with their native language. French is most commonly studied and used in southern Europe, especially in Mediterranean countries, in Germany, Portugal, Romania, the Benelux countries and Ireland. German, on the other hand, is commonly studied and used in the Benelux countries, in Scandinavia, and in the newer EU member states. Spanish is most commonly studied in France, Italy, Luxembourg, and Portugal. In 19 out of 29 countries polled, English is the most widely known language apart from the native language, this being particularly the case in Sweden (89%), Malta (88%); the Netherlands (87%); and Denmark (86%). A total of 77% of EU citizens believe that children should learn English. English was considered the number one language to learn in all countries where the research was conducted except for Ireland and Luxembourg. English, either as a native language or as a second/foreign language, is spoken by 44% of EU citizens, followed by German with 36% and French with 30%.

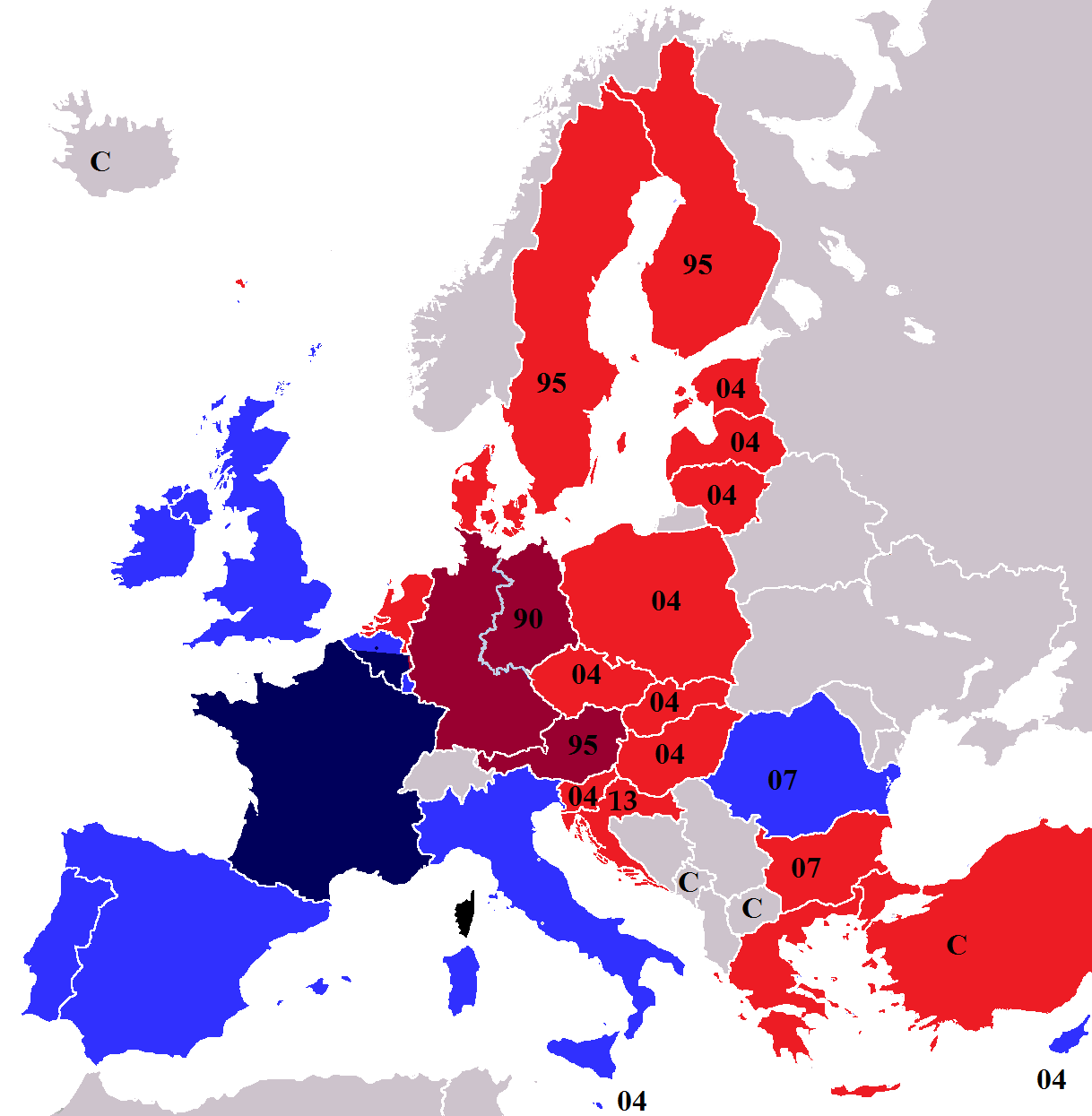
The EU enlargements since 1990 have largely favoured the position of German relative to French. The only exceptions are Romania, Cyprus and Malta. Red: Countries where German is more known than French. Blue: Countries where French is more known than German. Darker colours: Native countries. Figure: year of accession. C: Candidate country.

With the enlargement of the European Union, the balance between French and German is slowly changing. More citizens in the new member states speak German (23% compared with 12% in the EU15) while fewer speak French or Spanish (3% and 1% respectively compared with 16% and 7% among the EU15 group). A notable exception is Romania, where 24% of the population speaks French as a foreign language compared to 6% who speak German as a foreign language. At the same time, the balance is being changed in the opposite direction by growth of the French-speaking population and decrease of the German-speaking population.

Language skills are unevenly distributed both over the geographical area of Europe and over sociodemographic groups. Reasonably good language competences are perceived in relatively small member states with several state languages, lesser used native languages or "language exchange" with neighbouring countries. This is the case in Luxembourg, where 92% speak at least two languages. Those who live in southern European countries or countries where one of the major European languages is a state language have a lower likelihood of speaking multiple foreign languages. Only 5% of Turks, 13% of Irish, 16% of Italians, 17% of Spaniards and 18% of Britons speak at least two languages apart from their native language.

== Working languages ==
=== European Commission ===
While documents for and communication with citizens are in every official EU language as a right, day-to-day work in the European Commission is based around its three working languages: English, French, and German. Of these, English and French are used the most often. The use of English vs. French depends greatly on the unit or directorate. Only a few of the commissioners use a language other than English or French as their working language. German is rarely used as a true working language in the Commission, and German media have called the dominance of English and French a discrimination against German (which is the most spoken mother tongue of the EU) and a violation of the regulations pertaining to the EU's working languages. The German Bundestag has repeatedly called for German to receive an equal position in the Commission alongside English and French. The language situation has also disappointed many in France, and Kristalina Georgieva, who is from Bulgaria, gained a round of applause when she told the European Parliament she would learn French while in the Commission.

Use of German has, however, been increasing in EU institutions, as has the number of people learning the language across Europe.

=== European Parliament ===
The European Parliament translates its proceedings into all official languages so that fellow MEPs can understand them better than if they had the delayed translation. Committee meetings also often default to the language most understood by those attending instead of listening to the translation.

=== Court of Justice of the European Union ===
The working language of the Court of Justice of the European Union is French. The judges deliberate in French, pleadings and written legal submissions are translated into French, and the judgment is drafted in French. The Advocates-General, by contrast, may work and draft their opinions in any official language, as they do not take part in any deliberations. These opinions are then translated into French for the benefit of the judges and their deliberations.

=== European Central Bank ===
The working language of the European Central Bank is English.

== Policy ==
The European Union's legal powers on legislative acts and other initiatives on language policy are based on the provisions of the Treaties of the European Union. In the EU, language policy is the responsibility of member states, and the European Union does not have a common "language policy". Based on the principle of subsidiarity, European Union institutions play a supporting role in this field, promoting cooperation between the member states and promoting the European dimension in the member states' language policies, particularly through the teaching and dissemination of the languages of the member states (Article 149.2). The rules governing the languages of the institutions of the Community shall, without prejudice to the provisions contained in the Statute of the Court of Justice, be determined by the council, acting unanimously (Article 290). All languages, in which was originally drawn up or was translated due to enlargement, are legally equally authentic. Every citizen of the Union may write to any of the EU institutions or bodies in one of these languages and receive an answer in the same language (Article 24 TFEU).

In the Charter of Fundamental Rights, legally binding since its inclusion in the Treaty of Lisbon, the EU declares that it respects linguistic diversity (Article 22) and prohibits discrimination on grounds of language (Article 21). Respect for linguistic diversity is a fundamental value of the European Union, in the same way as respect for the person, openness towards other cultures, and tolerance and acceptance of other people.

Although not an EU treaty, most EU member states have ratified the European Charter for Regional or Minority Languages.

== Languages of the EU member states ==
- Austria
- Belgium
- Bulgaria
- Croatia
- Cyprus
- Czech Republic
- Denmark
- Estonia
- Finland
- France
- Germany
- Greece
- Hungary
- (Republic of Ireland) Ireland
- Italy
- Latvia
- Lithuania
- Luxembourg
- Malta
- Netherlands
- Poland
- Portugal
- Romania
- Slovakia
- Slovenia
- Spain
- Sweden

== See also ==
- Euromosaic
- European Charter for Regional or Minority Languages (ECRML) – a 1992 Council of Europe treaty
- Languages of Europe
  - English language in Europe
  - French language in Europe
  - German language in Europe
- European Day of Languages – 26 September
- Language and the euro
- Translation Centre for the Bodies of the European Union (CDT) – Inter-Active Terminology for Europe (IATE)

== Bibliography ==
=== Special Eurobarometers ===
- Directorate-General for Education and Culture (February 2006). Special Eurobarometer 243: Europeans and their Languages. (Fieldwork: November – December 2005. Publication: February 2006). Brussels: European Commission. p. 176. Archived from the original on 21 August 2024.
- Directorate-General for Education and Culture (June 2012). Special Eurobarometer 386: Europeans and their Languages. (Fieldwork: February – March 2012. Publication: June 2012) (PDF). Brussels: European Commission. p. 147. Archived from the original (PDF) on 6 January 2016.
- Directorate-General for Education and Culture (May 2024). Special Eurobarometer 540: Europeans and their Languages. (Fieldwork: September – October 2023. Publication: May 2024). Brussels: European Commission. p. 181. doi:10.2766/28257. ISBN 978-92-68-12045-3. Archived from the original on 21 August 2024.

=== Further reading ===
- Sabine Fiedler (2010). "Approaches to fair linguistic communication". European Journal of Language Policy. 2 (1): 1–21. doi:10.3828/ejlp.2010.2.
- Gazzola, Michele (4 October 2006). "Managing multilingualism in the European Union: language policy evaluation for the European Parliament". Language Policy. 5 (4): 395–419. doi:10.1007/s10993-006-9032-5. ISSN 1568-4555. S2CID 53576362.
- Hogan-Brun, Gabrielle and Stefan Wolff. 2003. Minority Languages in Europe: Frameworks, Status, Prospects. Palgrave. ISBN 1-4039-0396-4
- Nic Craith, Máiréad. 2005. Europe and the Politics of Language: Citizens, Migrants and Outsiders. Palgrave. ISBN 1-4039-1833-3
- Richard L. Creech, "Law and Language in the European Union: The Paradox of a Babel ‘United in Diversity’" (Europa Law Publishing: Groningen, 2005) ISBN 90-76871-43-4
- Shetter, William Z., EU Language Year 2001: Celebrating diversity but with a hangover, Language Miniature No 63.
- Shetter, William Z., Harmony or Cacophony: The Global Language System, Language Miniature No 96.
- Van der Jeught, Stefaan (2015). EU Language Law, Groningen: Europa Law Publishing, ISBN 9789089521729.
- Alice Leal, Seán Ó Riain, Language Policy and the Future of Europe, Routledge, 2023
- Bruyas, Pierrick, Le multilinguisme de l'Union européenne : Etude d'un modèle de l'intégration, Brussels, Larcier, 2025, ISBN 978-2-8027-7590-4
- Bruyas, Pierrick, The Multilingualism of the EU: Unravelling Underlying Principles of European Integration, Cambridge, Intersentia, 2026, ISBN 9781839706462
