= Juvenes Translatores =

- Awarded for: The best translation by young translators of a single page text from any one of the 24 official languages of the European Union into any other official EU language.
- Country: Translation test carried out simultaneously in participating schools across all member states of the European Union - Award Ceremony in Brussels
- Presented by
- First award: 2007
- Website: https://commission.europa.eu/education/skills-and-qualifications/develop-your-language-skills/juvenes-translatores_en

Juvenes Translatores (Latin for "young translators") is an annual online translation contest for 17-year-old students from secondary schools based in the European Union. It has been organised by the Directorate-General for Translation (DGT) of the European Commission since 2007, with a key aim to promote language learning in schools and give young people a taste of what it is like to be a translator. Each year over 3,000 students take part in the contest.

The contest has inspired and encouraged some of the participants to pursue language courses at the university level and to become professional translators. Throughout the years, interest from schools has grown, confirming the success of this initiative to promote language learning at the secondary education level. Multilingualism, and therefore translation, have been an integral part and richness of the EU since its beginnings.

== Objectives ==
Juvenes Translatores contest aims at:

- promoting language learning at school;
- promoting multilingualism;
- promoting the understanding of and openness towards other cultures;
- promoting the translation career;
- promoting the value and benefits of translation in business.

== Basic rules ==
All 17-year-old students from secondary schools based in the European Union and recognized by their public authorities can take part in the Juvenes Translatores contest.

A participating school should ensure suitable facilities and IT equipment, provide staff as well as ensure fair and impartial conditions throughout the whole process of the contest. As there are more schools willing to take part in the contest than can be accommodated each round, a random selection of participating schools takes place. The number of selected schools per country is equal to the number of seats that each country has in the European Parliament. When selected schools are announced on the official website, they can register between 2 and 5 students to participate in the contest.

The contest will be held simultaneously in all selected schools across the EU in late November. On contest day, participants have 2 hours to translate a one-page text online. The source text and the translation must be in an official EU language; as of 2022, there are 24 such languages, giving competitors 552 (24 times 23) language pairs to choose from. Students should decide on their preferred language pair prior to the contest day. The use of online dictionaries, spell checkers, computer-assisted translation (CAT) tools, as well as machine translation are not allowed. Only paper dictionaries can be used assupport.

The organisers and DGT translators, assess all translations which are anonymously submitted via the online platform on which the contest takes place. The main criteria to select the winning translation for each EU country are: accuracy, grammar, punctuation, creativity and fluency.

The contest culminates in the Award ceremony in Brussels. The winners, one per Member State, attend the ceremony in spring, in the presence of the Commissioner. They are accompanied by their language teacher and one of the parents to honor their remarkable achievement.

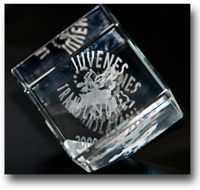

If too many schools apply from a particular country, the Commission uses a random selection method to choose between them. DGT translators evaluate the translations and select one winner per country. All 27 winners are invited to Brussels to receive their prize and attend the award ceremony.

== Stages ==
These are the main stages of the contest:

- Preparations (registration of schools, randomised selection of schools, registration of students, local preparations at schools, etc.)
- Contest day
- Award ceremony for winners
- General feedback to schools, ‘special mentions’ for other outstanding translations in each country
