= Jargonness =

Jargon and science communication

Jargonness is a piecewise mathematical function mapping the frequencies of a word's appearance in scientific and contemporary English corpora to a parameter quantifying the word's association with scientific jargon – the "jargonness" of that word. It is expressed mathematically as:

$$jargonness = \begin{cases} log \left ( \frac{f_s}{f_g} \right ), & f_g > 0 \\ 3,  & f_g = 0  \end{cases}$$

In the above equation, $f_g$ stands for the frequency of a word's appearance in a general English-language corpus, $f_s$ stands for its frequency in a scientific corpus, and $log$ is the common (base-10) logarithm.

== Method of use ==
Both the frequencies ($f_g$ and $f_s$) must be determined and then substituted in the above equation to calculate the word's jargonness. In case a word has no mention in the general English corpus, 3 is taken as its jargonness as suggested by the second part of the equation. Noticing that the logarithm in the first part of the equation is a common one (to the base 10), this simply means that the word is assumed to be a thousand times more likely to appear in a scientific text than a non-scientific one.

=== Examples of corpora ===
The corpora that have most commonly been employed to determine the frequencies mentioned above are the following:

- Professional English Research Consortium Corpus (for scientific vocabulary; 17 million words)
- British National Corpus (for common vocabulary; 97 million words)
