= Interactive Terminology for Europe =

Interactive Terminology for Europe (IATE) is the interinstitutional terminology database of the European Union. The project was launched in 1999 with the objective of creating a web-based interface for all EU terminology resources so as to make the information more easily available and ensure its standardisation throughout the EU institutions. It has been used in the EU institutions and agencies since summer 2004. A public user interface was released for testing in early 2007 and was officially opened on 28 June 2007. A new version was released on 7 November 2018 following a full rebuild of the system with state-of-the-art technologies, the latest software development standards, best practices on usability and accessibility, and a new look and feel.

IATE incorporated all of the existing terminology databases of the EU's translation services into one interinstitutional database containing approximately 1.4 million multilingual entries. The following legacy databases were imported into IATE:

- Eurodicautom (European Commission)
- TIS (Council of the European Union)
- Euterpe (European Parliament)
- Euroterms (Translation Centre for the Bodies of the European Union)
- CDCTERM (European Court of Auditors).

IATE is intended to contain a single entry per concept, but actually contains multiple entries for many concepts. As these entries have been consolidated the number of entries has fallen, from approximately 1.4 million to less than 1 million, despite the addition of many new entries for new and previously unrecorded concepts.

The project partners are the European Commission, European Parliament, Council of the European Union, European Court of Justice, European Court of Auditors, European Economic and Social Committee, European Committee of the Regions, European Central Bank, European Investment Bank, and the Translation Centre for the Bodies of the European Union.

The IATE web site is administered by the EU Translation Centre in Luxembourg on behalf of the project partners. The subject 'domains' are based on Eurovoc.

The entire IATE glossary database can be downloaded for free in a zipped format, then multilanguage glossaries can be generated using a free tool.

== See also ==
- European Thesaurus on International Relations and Area Studies
- EuroVoc
- Terminology Coordination Unit of the European Parliament
