= European Sign Language Centre =

Nonprofit organization

- Founded: 2006
- Region served: Member states of the European Union
- Website: signlanguage.eu

The European Sign Language Centre (ESC) is a nonprofit organization, working towards greater recognition and use of sign language.

== See also ==
- European Union of the Deaf
- World Federation of the Deaf
- Languages of the European Union
