= Eurodicautom =

European terminology database

Eurodicautom

Eurodicautom was the pioneering terminology database of the European Commission, launched in 1975 to support translators and staff in managing multilingual terminology. Originating from computational linguistics research at the Université libre de Bruxelles, it became one of the first large-scale digital terminology systems, initially covering six languages and expanding to eleven (plus Latin for scientific names) as the European Community grew. By 1980, it was accessible online within the Commission, and later offered public access, influencing modern translation technologies such as IATE.

== History and development ==
=== Origins with DICAUTOM ===
Eurodicautom originated from DICAUTOM (Dictionnaire Automatique), an automated dictionary consultation project developed between 1961 and 1963 by the Groupe de Linguistique Automatique at the Université libre de Bruxelles (ULB) under Euratom contract No. 018615 CETB. This collaborative effort involved researchers such as J.A. Bachrach, J. Blois, P. Decresy, F. Defijn, L. Hirschberg, and J. Mommens. DICAUTOM aimed to assist human translators by automating dictionary searches, utilizing a morphological analysis system developed by Jacques Blois and lexical choice concordances from high-energy physics by L. Hirschberg, implemented on early computers like the IBM 7090 and IBM 1620. It drew inspiration from machine translation research at Georgetown University.

By June 1963, DICAUTOM was completed, featuring a morphological analysis system developed by Blois that reduced ambiguity by providing precise, single-term translations, eliminating the need for labor-intensive contextual searches. This work was recognized in the National Science Foundation's 1962 report, which highlighted its contributions to automatic translation and linguistic data processing. A key component of this system was detailed in Blois's 1962 work, Morphologie du français pour la traduction automatique, published under Euratom, which enabled automatic French synthesis and was tested on the IBM 1620.

=== The third version of DICAUTOM and its impact ===
A significant evolution of DICAUTOM occurred with the third version, presented at COLING 1967 in Grenoble. This version introduced contextual analysis improvements and was optimized for German, marking an important milestone in multilingual terminology management. Unlike the initial version, which operated on IBM 1620 and IBM 7090, this iteration was tested on the IBM System/360 Model 40, allowing for faster dictionary lookups and more efficient morphological analysis.

This third version was developed in response to the growing needs of translators within the European Community, emphasizing automatic retrieval of multilingual terminology while minimizing ambiguity. The innovations introduced in DICAUTOM III directly influenced the development of Eurodicautom, which was launched in 1975 as a full-scale operational terminology database.

DICAUTOM’s success was noted in ALPAC’s 1966 report, which evaluated the state of machine translation research and acknowledged DICAUTOM as a valuable tool for translators, in contrast to fully automated translation systems, which still faced major challenges at the time. The system was also referenced in Victor H. Yngve’s 1964 article in Science, highlighting its role in the evolution of automatic information processing in Europe.

The transition from DICAUTOM to Eurodicautom was facilitated by its ability to scale up, handling an increasing number of languages and terminological domains. While DICAUTOM focused on technical terminology for scientific translation, Eurodicautom expanded to cover legal, economic, and administrative terminology, making it a cornerstone of multilingual communication in the European Commission.

Eurodicautom, officially launched in 1975, inherited many of DICAUTOM's core innovations, particularly its morphological analysis system, and was progressively improved to support an expanding number of official European languages.

=== Expansion and implementation ===
Introduced in 1975 to address the growing need for consistent terminology across the European Economic Community (EEC), Eurodicautom transitioned from a paper-based system to a digital database. By 1980, it was accessible online within the Commission, becoming a pioneer in computer-assisted translation (CAT). As the EEC expanded, it grew from six to eleven languages—including Danish, Dutch, English, French, German, Greek, Italian, Portuguese, Spanish, Finnish, and Swedish—with Latin added for scientific nomenclature in fields like botany and zoology.

In the late 1990s, public user interfaces were added, making Eurodicautom freely accessible and a valuable resource for translators, academics, and professionals worldwide. It featured multilingual coverage, domain-specific terminology (law, economics, agriculture, science, technology), contextual information (definitions, usage notes), and robust search functionality, updated regularly by Commission experts.

== Impact and legacy ==
Eurodicautom significantly influenced terminology standardization within European institutions, streamlining legal, technical, and scientific translations across member states. Students from institutions like Rennes University UFR2 (LEA department) contributed to its development, enhancing its entries while gaining practical experience in translation and terminology management. The contributions of Jacques Blois and the DICAUTOM project gained international recognition, notably in a 1964 article by Victor H. Yngve in Science, which cited its morphological analysis as part of advancements in automatic information processing in Western Europe.

In 2007, Eurodicautom was integrated into Interactive Terminology for Europe (IATE), which expanded to all 24 official EU languages with enhanced features. Though no longer in use, Eurodicautom's methodologies—rooted in DICAUTOM's innovations—continue to shape modern translation and terminology systems. Emerging amid the 1950s-1960s surge in machine translation research, it exemplified the potential of computational tools to support multilingual communication, leaving a lasting legacy in the EU's commitment to linguistic diversity.
