= European Thesaurus on International Relations and Area Studies =

The European Thesaurus on International Relations and Area Studies (abbreviated: European Thesaurus) is a multilingual, interdisciplinary thesaurus covering the subject fields of International Relations and Area Studies. The European Thesaurus consists of about 8.200 descriptors organised in 24 subdomains. To enhance the access to the thesaurus’ controlled vocabulary the descriptors are arranged both alphabetically as well as systematically. The semantic relationships (equivalence, hierarchy, association) between all individual descriptors have been established. The European Thesaurus is intended to be used primarily in bibliographic databases for indexing and retrieval of professional literature from the relevant domains. The European Thesaurus can, in addition, even serve as a terminological reference work and/or as a translation tool in international affairs matters.

The European Thesaurus was developed by an international working group in the framework of a terminology cooperation project carried out by the European Information Network on International Relations and Area Studies (EINIRAS).

The European Thesaurus is available in nine languages: Croatian, Czech, English, French, German, Italian, Polish, Russian, Spanish. A Greek version is currently being translated.

At present the European Thesaurus is applied by academic organisations and research institutes in Germany (German Information Network International Relations and Area Studies – database World Affairs Online –), the Czech Republic (Institute of International Relations Prague) and Poland (Polish Institute of International Affairs, Warsaw). The European Thesaurus is updated regularly.

The European Thesaurus is publicly accessible via the academic internet portal IREON (International RElations and area studies ONline).
