= Translation Centre for the Bodies of the European Union =

Agency of the European Union

Agency overview
- Formed: 28 November 1994
- Jurisdiction: European Union
- Headquarters: Luxembourg, Grand Duchy of Luxembourg
- Key documents: Council Regulation (EC) No 2965/94; Council Regulation (EC) No 2610/95; Council Regulation (EC) No 1645/2003
- Website: cdt.europa.eu

The Translation Centre for the Bodies of the European Union (CdT) is an EU agency based in Luxembourg City. Its primary role is to cater for the diverse multilingual communication needs of the EU agencies and other EU bodies. In addition, it may be called upon by the EU institutions to absorb any surplus work they may have.

The centre also contributes to interinstitutional cooperation between the EU's various translation services with the aim of promoting the use of EU terminology and the sharing of best practices and tools in the language field.

The Centre provides services in the 24 official EU languages and in various non-EU languages, involving over 700 language combinations in total.

== Function ==
- Provide language services to decentralized EU bodies (mainly agencies), as well as institutions where necessary, on the basis of a cooperation agreement signed with each client.
- Contribute to interinstitutional cooperation between the different translation services in the EU with the aim of streamlining working methods and harmonizing procedures.

== InterActive Terminology for Europe ==
As part of its function, the Centre manages Inter-Active Terminology for Europe, the largest terminology database in the world, on behalf of the EU institutions.

== Legal background ==
The Regulation (Council Regulation (EC) No 2965/94) establishing the centre was adopted by the Council of the European Union in November 1994. It was revised on two occasions: firstly, in 1995 (Council Regulation (EC) No 2610/95), to extend the centre's activities to those institutions and bodies that have a translation service and to strengthen interinstitutional cooperation in the field of translation; and, secondly, in 2003 (Council Regulation (EC) No 1645/2003), to bring certain provisions into line with the Council Regulation on the Financial Regulation applicable to the general budget of the European Communities.

== Governance ==
The centre is governed by a management board with representatives from the Member States, its clients and two representatives from the European Commission. The chairman of the management board is Christos Ellinides, Director-General of the Directorate-General for Translation of the European Commission.

The centre's legal representative is the Director, Ildikó Horváth, who is responsible for its day-to-day administration and who reports to the centre's management board.

== EU Agencies Network ==
The Translation Centre is a member of the EU Agencies Network. The EU Agencies were set up by the EU Member States and the EU institutions to provide services to industries and citizens and carry out specific legal, technical or scientific tasks under EU law.

== About the emblem ==
This emblem is protected under Article 6ter of the Paris Convention and is registered with WIPO (6ter No QO2517).

This file is made available under the Creative Commons Attribution 4.0 International (CC-BY-NC-ND 4.0) license for informational and encyclopedic purposes only.

This license does not grant any right to use the emblem for official, commercial, promotional, or misleading purposes, nor does it imply endorsement by the Translation Centre for the Bodies of the European Union. Any such use requires prior authorisation from the centre.
