= Directorate-General for Translation =

European Commission agency

The Directorate-General for Translation (DGT) translates texts for the European Commission into and out of the EU's 24 official languages, and a few others when needed. The department deals exclusively with written texts.

== Activities ==
The unit is responsible for:

- editing original documents drafted by Commission authors
- advising Commission departments on language and on managing multilingual websites
- translating laws, policy papers, reports, correspondence, etc. drafted by or sent to the Commission
- helping the Commission communicate with the public, thereby helping citizens understand EU policies
- ensuring correct terminology in all official EU languages, as documented in the interinstitutional database Interactive Terminology for Europe (IATE).

The unit translates 2.5 million documents a year, as at 2022. It uses a combination of people and machine translation. Press releases are routinely translated into English, French, German and languages relevant to the particular document.

In 2026, the DGT invited master students to participate in a project to rate AI translations.

The DGT runs programs to interest students in translation careers, including:

- the TraTra workshop series;
- the annual Juvenes Translatores translation competition.

== See also ==
- Translation Centre for the Bodies of the European Union
