= European School, Brussels =

European School, Brussels or European School of Brussels may refer to one of five schools offering the European Baccalaureate established in Brussels, Belgium or nearby municipalities:

- European School, Brussels I, located in the Brussels suburb of Uccle
- European School, Brussels II, located in the Brussels suburb of Woluwe-Saint-Lambert
- European School, Brussels III, located in the Brussels suburb of Ixelles
- European School, Brussels IV, located in the Brussels suburb of Laeken
- European School of Bruxelles-Argenteuil, located in the Belgian municipality of Waterloo
