= List of schools in Brussels =

An incomplete list of schools in the Brussels-Capital Region, Belgium.

== A ==
- Anderlecht
  - Collège Matteo Ricci
  - Institut Redouté-Peiffer
- Auderghem
  - Athénée Royal d'Auderghem
  - Japanese School of Brussels

== B ==
- City of Brussels
  - Athénée Adolphe Max
  - Athénée Robert Catteau
  - INSAS
  - Isabelle Gatti de Gamond Royal Atheneum
  - Royal Academy of Fine Arts
  - St John Berchmans College

== E ==
- Etterbeek
  - Brussels International Catholic School
  - Collège Saint-Michel
  - St. Michael's College

== I ==
- Ixelles
  - European School, Brussels III
  - Institut Saint-André
  - Institut Saint-Luc

== L ==
- Laeken
  - European School, Brussels IV
  - John of Ruysbroeck College

== M ==
- Molenbeek-Saint-Jean
  - Athénée Royal Serge Creuz

== U ==
- Uccle
  - Bogaerts International School
  - European School, Brussels I
  - Lycée français Jean Monnet
  - Russian Embassy School in Brussels

== W ==
- Watermael-Boitsfort
  - International School of Brussels
- Woluwe-Saint-Lambert
  - European School, Brussels II
