= European School, Varese =

- Schola Europaea

Location
- Via Montello, 118; Varese, Lombardy, 21100; Italy
- Coordinates: 45°49′54″N 8°48′34″E

Information
- Type: European School
- Established: 1960
- Operated by: The European Schools
- Director: Ariane Farinelle
- Gender: Mixed
- Age range: 4 to 18
- Enrolment: 1,306 (2023-2024)
- Student Union/Association: The Pupils' Committee
- Sister Schools: 12 European Schools
- Diploma: European Baccalaureate
- Website: www.eurscva.eu

The European School, Varese, commonly known as the ESV, is one of thirteen European Schools, and the only one to be established in Italy. Founded in 1960 in the city of Varese, in the North-Italian region of Lombardy, its primary purpose is to provide an education to the children of European Union staff posted to one of the three institutes of the European Commission's Joint Research Centre located in the nearby town of Ispra.

The school has three sections; a two-year nursery school, a 5-year primary school, and a 7-year secondary school.

== Notable alumni ==
- Philippe Daverio
- Laura Gauthier
- Thomas Larkin
- Analogy (band)
- Margherita Missoni
- Karin Giegerich

== See also ==
- European School
- European Schools
