= European School =

Type of international school

A European School (Latin: Schola Europaea) is a type of international school emphasising a multilingual and multicultural pedagogical approach to the teaching of nursery, primary and secondary students, leading to the European Baccalaureate as their secondary leaving qualification. Each European School is set up, financed, and operated by the international organisation, the "European Schools", controlled jointly by the member states of the European Union and the European Commission. The schools prioritise, for enrolment purposes, the children of EU staff.

The first European School, founded in Luxembourg, in 1953, had the objective of providing an education to the children of employees of the institutions of the European Coal and Steel Community — a forerunner of today's European Union. Originally, a private initiative of employees of the ECSC, the concept attracted the attention of EU founding father, Jean Monnet as capturing the spirit of the post-war effort to reconcile and integrate Europe.

As of September 2017, there are thirteen European Schools located in six EU member states in close proximity to European institutions.

Since 2005, upon a recommendation of the European Parliament, the title of an "Accredited European School" has been available for schools under national jurisdiction and financing, which have been approved, by the Board of Governors of the European Schools, to offer the European Schools' curriculum and the European Baccalaureate.

== Legal status ==
The schools, despite their close connection to the EU, are neither EU bodies, nor under the full jurisdiction of the individual member states of the European Union. They are instead administered and financed through the international organisation "The European Schools", established by means of an intergovernmental treaty, the 1957 Statute of the European School, since repealed and replaced by the 1994 Convention Defining the Statute of the European Schools. All EU member states, as well as the EU itself, and the European Atomic Energy Community (Euratom) are party to this agreement. As part of the UK's withdrawal from the EU, it will remain party to the convention until the end of the academic year ongoing at the end of the transition period. The Schools are legally recognised in all participating jurisdictions as public bodies.

== Locations ==
There are thirteen European Schools, (sometimes designated as "Type 1" European Schools in official documents) found in eight municipalities, across six EU countries, in close proximity to EU institutions, or in the case of the European School, Munich, the European Patent Organisation. There are currently five European Schools in Belgium (four in Brussels and one in Mol) and discussions are currently being held about building a fifth school in Brussels, to open in 2027.

In 2017, with the relocation of European Union-seconded researchers and their families following the formation of the successor project to the Joint European Torus fusion energy research programme, the European School, Culham was closed. The school affirmed this move was not connected with Brexit.

On 9 July 2021 the decision was made to move the Netherlands-based school from Bergen, to Alkmaar.

School	Country	Founded/Opened in
European School, Luxembourg I (Kirchberg)	Luxembourg	1953
European School, Brussels I (Uccle/Ukkel)	Belgium	1958
European School, Mol	Belgium	1960
European School, Varese	Italy	1960
European School, Karlsruhe	Germany	1962
European School, Bergen	Netherlands	1963
European School, Brussels II (Woluwe; Evere)	Belgium	1974
European School, Munich	Germany	1977
European School, Brussels III (Ixelles/Elsene)	Belgium	2000
European School, Frankfurt am Main	Germany	2002
European School, Alicante	Spain	2002
European School, Luxembourg II (Bertrange/Mamer)	Luxembourg	2004
European School, Brussels IV (Laeken/Laken)	Belgium	2006
European School, Culham	United Kingdom	1978 (closed on 31 August 2017)

== Curriculum ==
Age/Year equivalency table
Primary School
Age	Name	Abbreviation
6–7	First Year	P1
7–8	Second Year	P2
8–9	Third Year	P3
9–10	Fourth Year	P4
10–11	Fifth Year	P5
Secondary School
Age	Name	Abbreviation
11–12	First Year	S1
12–13	Second Year	S2
13–14	Third Year	S3
14–15	Fourth Year	S4
15–16	Fifth Year	S5
16–17	Sixth Year	S6
17–18	Seventh Year	S7

The curriculum is common to all thirteen schools and is centrally controlled by the Board of Inspectors and the Board of Governors.

=== Secondary level ===
Compulsory subjects for Years 1–7 of the secondary school:

- First language (normally mother tongue)
- Second language (Usually one of English, French or German, with some schools providing a local language such as Spanish, Italian, Danish or Dutch as alternate option)
- Mathematics
- History (instructed in second language from Year 3)
- Geography (instructed in second language from Year 3)
- Ethics/religion (instructed in second language from Year 3)
- Physical education (instruction in second language is possible from Year 3)

Compulsory for Years 1–3 of the secondary school:

- Art
- Music

Compulsory subjects for Years 1–5 of the secondary school:

- Third language (any EU official language, as long as a minimum number of students choose it in the same school)
- Natural sciences: physics, chemistry and biology (usually combined for Years 1–3)

Compulsory subjects for Years 6–7 of the secondary school:

- Philosophy
- Physics and/or chemistry and/or biology (at least one science subject is obligatory)

Optional subjects:

- ICT (instructed in second language) and Latin in Year 2—3 and 4—5 (you can stop between the first and second cycle of Latin)
- Economics (instructed in second language), music, or a fourth and fifth language in Years 4–7

=== Foreign language education ===
All modern foreign languages offered are taught using the direct method where the lessons are taught in the language being learned, and the use of the student's native tongue is discouraged. These foreign languages lessons are shared with pupils from other language streams. The idea is to encourage the pupils to use the language they are learning as a means of crossing the communication barrier between themselves and pupils from other language streams. From Year 3 onwards of the secondary school, History and Geography as well as other secondary subjects such as Music are taught in each student's second language. Many of the pupils find themselves in a foreign country, so are surrounded by a foreign language. Some pick it up through language immersion, hence some lessons are taught in the national language of the host country.

=== European Baccalaureate ===
The European Baccalaureate is the leaving certification of the European Schools, and should be distinguished from the International Baccalaureate (IB) and the baccalaureates of various national systems. It is a two-year course assessing the performance of students in the subjects taught in Years 6–7, and culminating in a final series exams taken at the end of Year 7. As per the multilingual ethos of the Schools, certain subjects are instructed and assessed in each student's respective second language. Details of the examinations are set out in the Annex of the Statute of the European School and in the regulations for the European Baccalaureate.

Those students undertaking the European Baccalaureate are required to study at least 8 and up to a maximum of 11 academic subjects, in addition to physical education and moral/religion, with different weightings according to the course choices made when commencing the Baccaluareate. The final mark is calculated as a percentage, where 50% is the minimum for a pass.

The European Baccalaureate is administered and directly supervised by an external examining board appointed annually by the Board of Governors. The examining board consists of up to three representatives of each member state, who must satisfy the conditions governing the appointment of equivalent examining boards in their respective countries. It is presided over by a senior university educator appointed by each member state in turn, assisted by a member of the Board of Inspectors of the Schools.

Article 5 (2) of the Statute provides that holders of the Baccalaureate shall:

- enjoy, in the Member State of which they are nationals, all the benefits attaching to the possession of the diploma or certificate awarded at the end of secondary school education in that country; and
- be entitled to seek admission to any university in the territory of any Member State on the same terms as nationals of that Member State with equivalent qualifications.

The first awards of the European Baccalaureate were made in 1959.

== Common extracurricular activities and events ==
Sports teams of the European Schools compete in the biennial Eurosport event, with the schools alternating as hosts. In addition, students of the schools have the opportunity to take part in the annual European Schools Science Composium, the winners of which represent the European Schools in the European Union Contest for Young Scientists.

The European Schools also cooperate to take advantage of their unique relationship to EU institutions to provide students on an annual basis with the opportunity to take part in political simulations of EU meetings, held on the premises of the institutions themselves. Students get the opportunity to role-play as delegates of EU member state governments in a Model European Council, MEPs in a Model European Parliament, or international journalists covering the meetings.

The federation of student representatives of the schools, CoSup, organises a "Europarty", held in a different European city each academic year, and open to any student of the European Schools over 16 years of age to attend.

== Notable alumni ==
- Chris Adami (Brussels I) is a German professor of microbiology and molecular genetics, as well as professor of physics and astronomy at Michigan State University.
- Tommaso Allan (Culham) is a rugby union player for Italy and Perpignan
- Dick Annegarn (Brussels I) is a Dutch songwriter who worked most of the time in France. In his youth he lived in Brussels and he celebrated this city in his most famous song, called "Bruxelles".
- Juan Becerra Acosta (Brussels I) is a Mexican journalist and TV anchor.
- Henry Brett (Culham) is a British champion polo player.
- Ulrich Daldrup (Brussels I) is a German politician and academic. He is Professor of Business Administration and International Management at the Aachen University of Applied Sciences and a former Mayor of Aachen (1994–1999).
- Eric Everard (Brussels and Luxembourg I) is a Belgian manager, who created in 1988 the European Student's Fair. In 1997 he founded Artexis, one of the largest organizers of exhibitions and trade fairs in Europe.
- Giovanni Ferrero (Brussels) is an Italian business manager, chief executive of Ferrero SpA
- Max Gazzè (Brussels II) is an Italian songwriter and musician who worked in Belgium, France and in Italy. He has worked with many European artists including Stephan Eicher and Stewart Copeland.
- Karin Giegerich (Varese) is a German actress, who worked in Italy, Germany, Switzerland and France.
- Florian Henckel von Donnersmarck (Brussels I) is a German film director who worked in Germany and in the United States. He is best known for writing and directing the 2007 Oscar-winning film The Lives of Others and The Tourist.
- Boris Johnson (Brussels I) is a British politician, former leader of the Conservative Party, and former Prime Minister of the United Kingdom (July 2019 – September 2022). He previously held the offices of Mayor of London (2008–2016), and Foreign Secretary of the UK (July 2016 – July 2018).
- Jo Johnson (Brussels I) is a British politician and former UK Minister for Universities and Science (May 2015 – January 2019) (July – September 2019), and Transport (January – November 2018).
- Rachel Johnson (Brussels I) is a British editor, journalist, television presenter, and author.
- Bas Kast (Munich) is a German journalist and writer.
- Christian Keysers (Munich) is a German neuroscientist. In 2004 he received the Marie Curie Excellence Award for outstanding research .
- Thomas Larkin (Varese) is an ice hockey defender. He played with the Italian national ice hockey team.
- Viktor Lazlo (real name Sonia Dronier) (Mol) is a French singer, actress and writer. She worked in Belgium and France.
- Mark Leonard (Brussels I) is a British political scientist, author, and the co-founder and director of the European Council on Foreign Relations.
- Stella Maxwell (Brussels II) is a Victoria's Secret model.
- Elizabeth May (Luxembourg I) is a lawyer and athlete, who is the 2011 ITU Aquathlon World Champion and 2009 European Triathlon Championships silver medalist. She competed in the triathlon event at the 2004 and 2008 Summer Olympics.
- Margherita Missoni (Varese) is the niece of Ottavio Missoni and the daughter of Angela, founders of the Missoni fashion house. After having worked for some years as a model, including for Estée Lauder Companies, she became the icon of the "Missoni acqua" perfume in 2006, thus becoming an active member of the Missoni family group.
- Brian Molko (Luxembourg I) is a songwriter, guitarist and lead vocalist of the band Placebo.
- Morten Helveg Petersen (Brussels I) is a Danish politician for the Danish Social Liberal Party and Member of the European Parliament (2014–). He previously served as a member of the Folketing (1998–2009).
- Sarah Teichmann (Karlsruhe) is a scientist at the University of Cambridge, UK.
- Ursula von der Leyen (Brussels I) is a German politician and President of the European Commission (December 2019–). She was formerly a member of the Bundestag (2009–2019), and member of the German government under Chancellor Merkel, holding the positions of Federal Minister of Defence (2013–2019), Federal Minister of Labour and Social Affairs (2009–2013) and Federal Minister of Senior Citizens, Women and Youth (2005–2009).
- Marina Wheeler QC (Brussels I) is a British lawyer, author and columnist.
- Diederik Wissels (Brussels I) is a Dutch jazz pianist who has received many awards such as the Grand Prix de l’Académie Charles Cros, the Prix Adami and the Prix du Musicien Européen de l’Académie du Jazz.
- Mathias Olesen (Luxembourg II) plays for Bundesliga team FC Köln and the Luxembourg national football team.
- Marta Estevez Garcia (Luxembourg I) Spanish-Luxembourgish football player, playing for Luxembourg women's national football team.
- Christos Floros (Luxembourg I and later on Luxembourg II) - Greek-Luxembourgish politician.

== See also ==
- Accredited European School
- European Baccalaureate
- European Schools
