= Lists of schools in Belgium =

This is an incomplete list of schools in Belgium, sorted by province.

== Antwerp ==
List of schools in Antwerp

== Brussels ==
List of schools in Brussels

== East Flanders ==
List of schools in Ghent

- Muda Institute, Evergem
- Sint-Lodewijkscollege, Lokeren
- St. Joseph College, Aalst

== Flemish Brabant ==
- British School of Brussels, Tervuren
- Brussels Elementary High School, Sterrebeek
- Heilige Drievuldigheidscollege, Leuven
- International German School of Brussels, Wezembeek-Oppem

== Hainaut ==
- Athénée Royal Vauban, Charleroi
- Collège Saint-Stanislas, Mons
- SHAPE High School, Maisières

== Liège ==
- Académie royale des beaux-arts de Liège, Liège
- Collège Saint-Benoît Saint-Servais, Liège
- Collège Saint-François-Xavier, Verviers
- Flône Abbey, Flône
- Royal Conservatory of Liège, Liège

== Limburg ==
- Sint-Hubertuscollege, Neerpelt

== Namur ==
- Collège Notre-Dame de la Paix, Erpent
- Collège Saint-Benoît de Maredsous, Denée

== Walloon Brabant ==
- European School of Bruxelles-Argenteuil, Waterloo
- ISF Waterloo, Waterloo
- Queen Elisabeth Music Chapel, Waterloo
- St. John's International School, Waterloo

== West Flanders ==
List of schools in West Flanders

== See also ==
- Education in Belgium
