= European School, Bergen =

- Schola Europaea
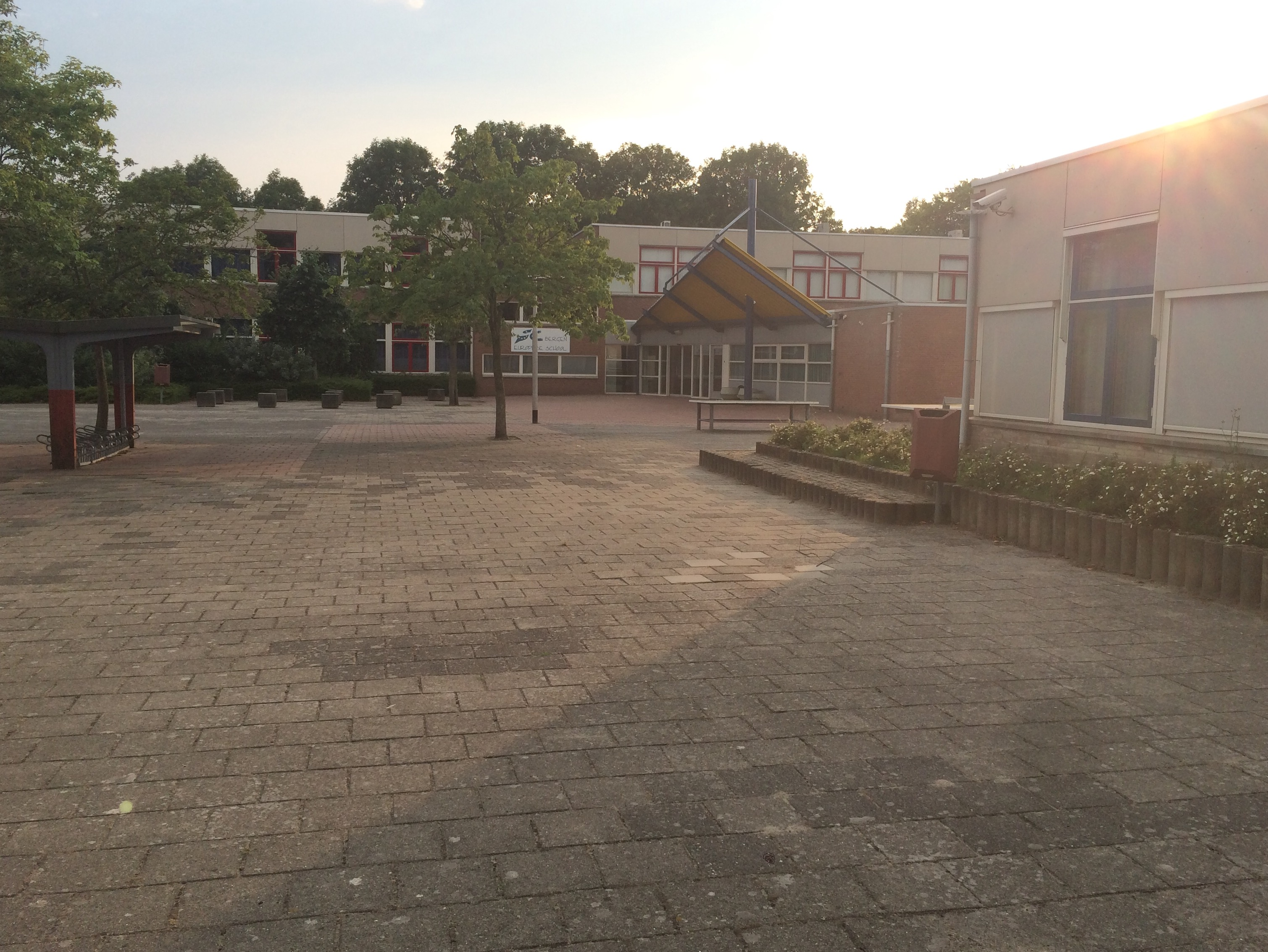
- European School, Bergen

Location
- Molenweidtje 5 Bergen, North Holland, 1862 BC; Netherlands
- Coordinates: 52.6780°N 4.7064°E

Information
- Type: European School
- Established: 1963
- Operated by: The European Schools
- Director: Per Frithiofson
- Gender: Mixed
- Age range: 4 to 18
- Enrolment: 481 (2023-24)
- Student Union/Association: The Pupils' Committee
- Sister Schools: 12 European Schools
- Diploma: European Baccalaureate
- Website: esbergen.eu

The European School, Bergen (in Dutch: Europese School Bergen, in French: École Européenne de Bergen, in German: Europäische Schule Bergen) (or ESB) is one of the thirteen European Schools. It is located in the town of Bergen in the Dutch province of North Holland. The school prioritises, for enrolment purposes, the children of European Union staff. Students must enrol in either the English, French or Dutch language sections of the school.

== History ==
The European School, Bergen was established in 1963 primarily to provide an education to the children of staff employed by the European Atomic Energy Community's (Euratom) nuclear research facility in nearby Petten - today under the remit of the European Commission's Joint Research Centre.

== EMA relocation ==
In 2019, enrollment in the school increased by 20% as a result of the relocation of the European Medicines Agency (EMA), its staff and their families to Amsterdam, as part of arrangements for the UK's withdrawal from the European Union. This increased the daily number of students commuting from Amsterdam to the school to 20% of total enrolment. As a result, the Dutch education ministry announced in late 2019 that it was investigating relocating the school to a new campus in 4 or 5 years time, with the municipalities of Alkmaar, Castricum and Zaanstad expressing interest in hosting the school. Eventually Zaanstad and Alkmaar filed motions to apply for this right. On July 9, 2021, the decision was made to move the school to Alkmaar.

== See also ==
- European School
- European Schools
