= European School, Alicante =

- Escuela Europea de Alicante
- Schola Europaea, Lucentum

Location
- Avenida Locutor Vicente Hipólito, s/n Alicante, 03540; Spain; 38°22′23″N 0°25′53″W

Information
- Type: European School
- Established: 2002
- Operated by: The European Schools
- Director: José Mário da Torre
- Gender: Mixed
- Age range: 4 to 18
- Enrolment: 1,129 (2023–2024)
- Student Union/Association: The Pupils' Committee
- Sister Schools: 12 European Schools
- Diploma: European Baccalaureate
- Website: www.escuelaeuropea.org

The European School of Alicante is one of thirteen European Schools and the only one in Spain. Founded in 2002, it primarily serves to provide an education to the children of staff posted to the European Union Intellectual Property Office, an EU agency based in the city of Alicante.

== See also ==
- European School
- European Schools
