= European School, Munich =

European School Munich
- Europäische Schule München

Location
- Elise-Aulinger-Straße, 21; Munich, Bavaria, 81739; Germany
- Coordinates: 48°05′47″N 11°38′23″E

Information
- Type: European School
- Established: 1977
- Oversight: European Schools
- Director: Anton Hrovath
- Director of secondary school: Martin Duggen
- Gender: Mixed
- Age range: 4 to 18
- Enrolment: 2,032 (2023-24)
- Student Union/Association: The Pupils' Committee
- Sister Schools: 12 European Schools
- Diploma: European Baccalaureate
- Website: www.esmunich.de

The European School Munich (ESM) is one of thirteen European Schools and one of three located in Germany. Founded in 1977, it moved to its current location in Neuperlach, a district in southeastern Munich. The ESM was principally established to serve the schooling needs of children of the staff of the European Patent Office (EPO) — the executive body of the European Patent Organisation. However, enrolment is open to other prospective students, albeit with a tuition fee. The school offers the European Baccalaureate as its secondary leaving qualification.

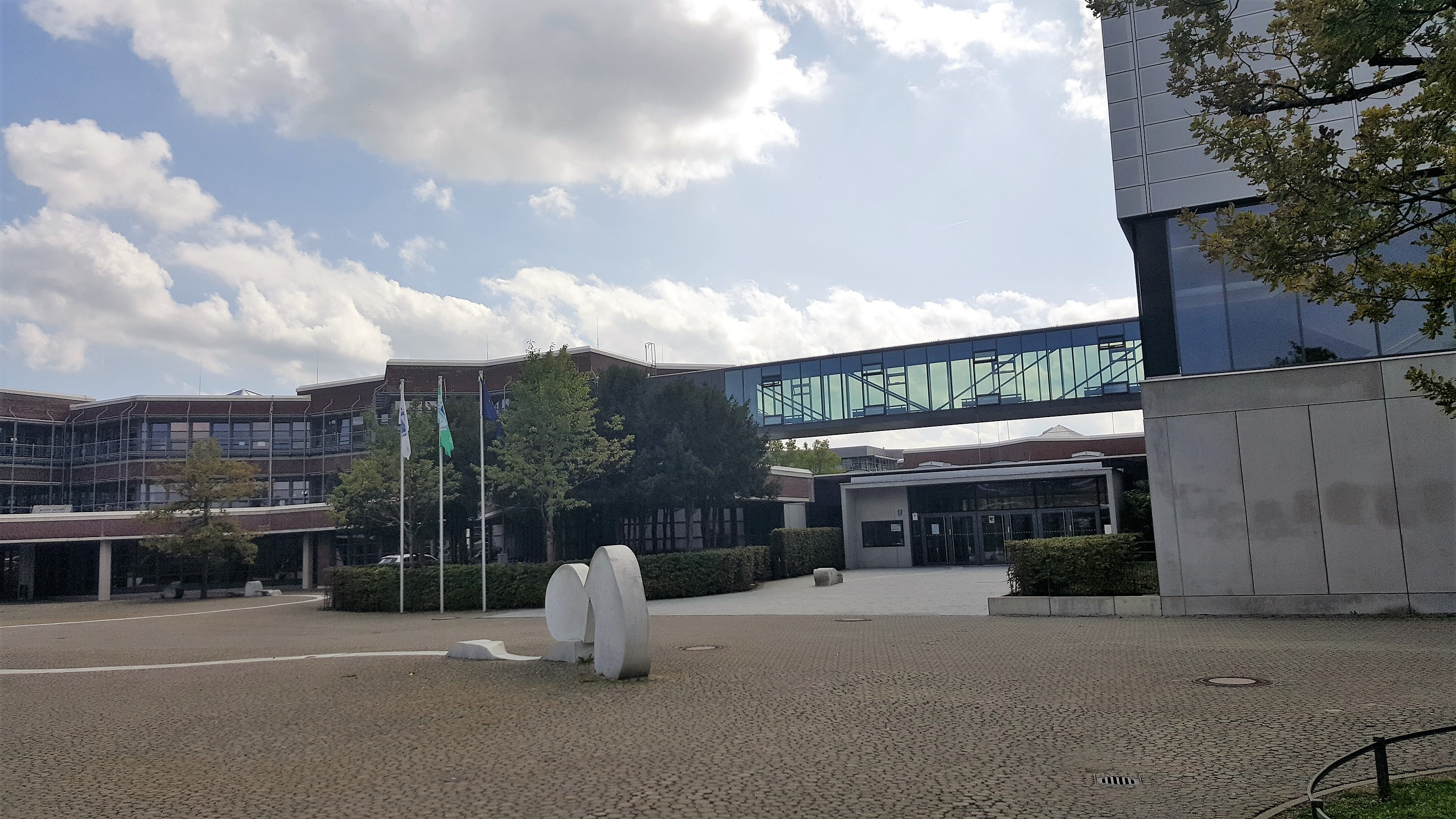
Main entrance of the ESM.

== Admission ==
For the purposes of admission, prospective students are divided into three different categories, depending on multiple factors, mainly their parent's employment status.

=== Category I ===
- Includes children of employees of the European Patent Office in Munich, of European Union institutions, of teachers, and of administrative and ancillary staff of the school. These children are required to be admitted to the school, and parents are exempt from paying tuition fees.

=== Category II ===
- Includes children covered by individual agreements or decisions, each entailing specific rights and obligations for the children concerned, particularly regarding tuition fees.

=== Category III ===
- Includes children not belonging to categories I and II. These children are given the least priority and may be admitted to a limited extent per relevant policy.

== Tuition fees ==
The following table displays the tuition fees for the school year 2024/2025, p.a., required to be paid by category III students.

Educational stage	Kindergarten	Primary school	Secondary school
Tuition fee (€)	4.284,70	5.891,53	8.033,89

== Notable people ==
=== Former alumni ===
- Bas Kast, German author
- Christian Keysers, German neuroscientist
- Peter Pomerantsev, British journalist and TV producer

=== Former staff ===
- Tom Høyem, school Director (1994-2000)

== See also ==
- European School
- European Schools
- European Baccalaureate
