= European School, Frankfurt am Main =

- Schola Europaea
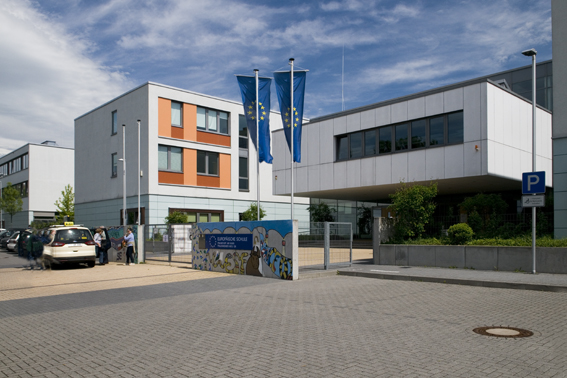

Location
- Praunheimer Weg 126, D-60439, Frankfurt am Main, Hesse; Germany
- 50°09′29″N 8°37′23″E

Information
- Type: European School
- Established: 2002
- Operated by: The European Schools
- Director: Anastasija Avsec (Slovenia)
- Gender: Mixed
- Age range: 4 to 18
- Enrolment: 1,654 (2023–24)
- Student Union/Association: The Pupils' Committee
- Sister Schools: 12 European Schools
- Diploma: European Baccalaureate
- Website: www.esffm.org

European School, Frankfurt am Main, or ESF (German: Europäische Schule Frankfurt am Main; French: École européenne de Francfort-sur-le-Main) is a European school in Frankfurt, Germany.

== History ==
The European School Frankfurt was opened in 2002 and caters for nursery school, primary school, and secondary students.

Approximately 1,500 pupils attend the school, of 45 nationalities. In addition to the four language sections (German, English, French and Italian) of the early years, the Spanish section was opened in September 2018. For the students without a language section (SWALS), apart from Maltese, all languages spoken in the member states of the EU are taught.

== See also ==
- European Schools
