= European School, Mol =

- Schola Europaea

Location
- Europawijk, 100; Mol, 2400; Belgium
- Coordinates: 51°12′05″N 5°02′42″E

Information
- Type: European School
- Established: 1960
- Operated by: The European Schools
- Director: María José Pérez Blanco
- Gender: Mixed
- Age range: 4-18
- Enrolment: 735 (2023-24)
- Student Union/Association: The Pupils' Committee
- Sister Schools: 12 European Schools
- Diploma: European Baccalaureate
- Website: www.esmol.net//

The European School, Mol was the third of the thirteen European Schools to be established, and is one of five such schools in Belgium. Founded in 1960, it is located in Mol, in the province of Antwerp.

The school was primarily established to provide an education to the children of staff posted to nearby domestic, and European atomic research projects and facilities; the Belgian governments' nuclear research centre, the Organisation for Economic Co-operation and Development's Eurochemic nuclear fuel reprocessing plant (now defunct), and the European Atomic Energy Community's Central Bureau for Nuclear Measurements (now under the auspices of the European Commission as the Institute for Reference Materials and Measurements).

However, the school has also welcomed children from other European or overseas families who live and work in the area. Buses bring pupils from as far as Antwerp and Eindhoven, with nearby facilities to accommodate boarders during the school week.

There are 2 divisions in the European schools campus, 1 is the primary where primary 1 - 5 (grades 1 - 5) and secondary, where secondary 1 - 7 ( grades 6th - 12th ).

The primary has a Daycare, where students can stay in after the school end at 4:15pm.

== See also ==
- European School
- European Schools
