= European School Karlsruhe =

- Schola Europaea
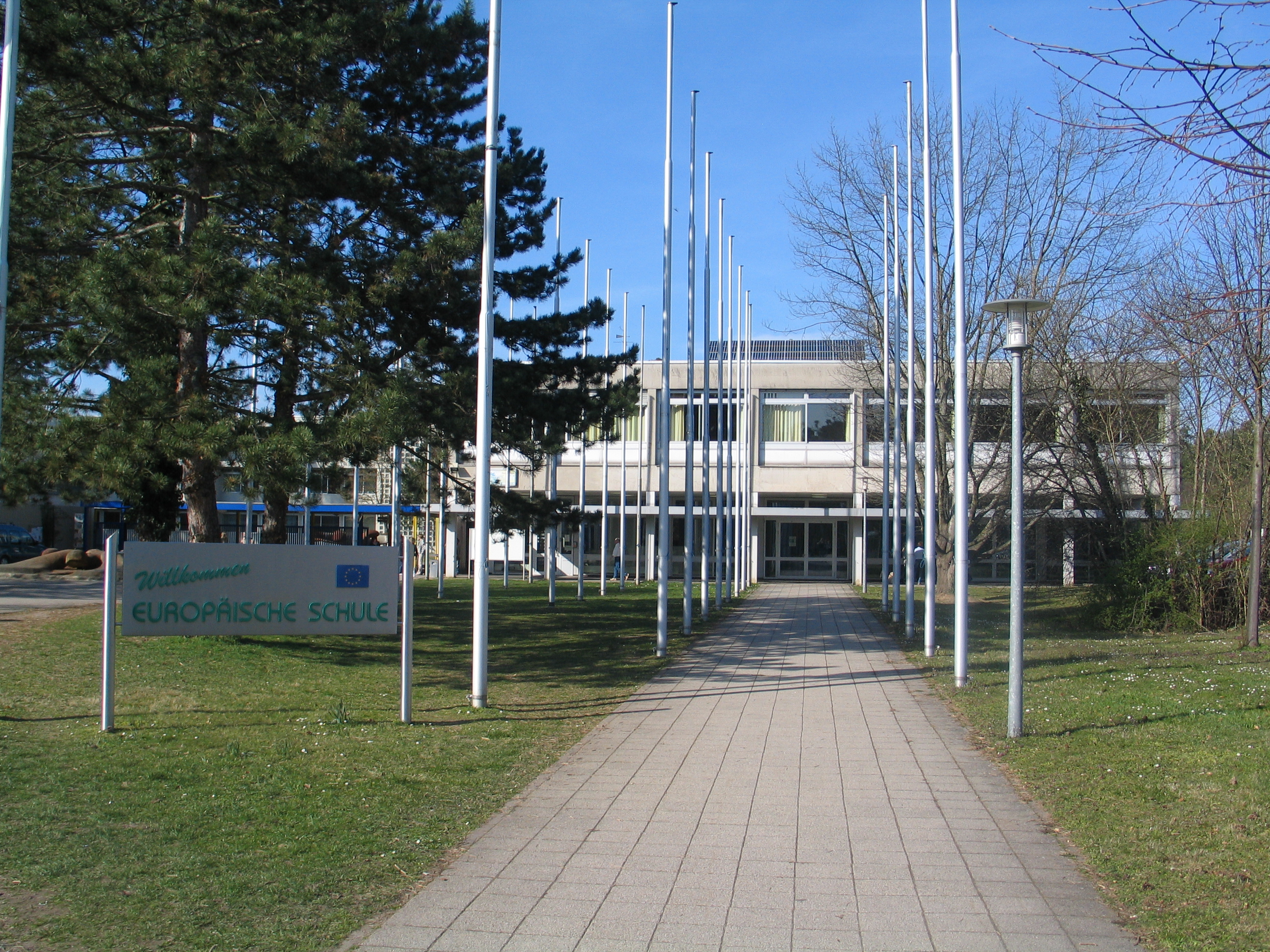

Location
- Albert-Schweitzer-Straße 1 Karlsruhe, Baden-Württemberg, 76139; Germany
- Coordinates: 49°02′47″N 8°26′46″E

Information
- Type: European School
- Established: 1962
- Operated by: The European Schools
- Director: Lászlo Munkácsy (Hungary)
- Gender: Mixed
- Age range: 4 to 18
- Enrolment: 970 (2023-24)
- Student Union/Association: The Pupils' Committee
- Sister Schools: 12 European Schools
- Diploma: European Baccalaureate
- Website: www.es-karlsruhe.eu

The European School Karlsruhe, commonly known as ESK, is one of three European Schools in Germany and one of thirteen across the European Union (EU). Founded in 1962, the school prioritises, for enrollment purposes, the children of staff of the European Commission's Joint Research Centre for Nuclear Safety and Security based nearby in their respective mother tongue and by native speaker teachers. Children of non-EU staff may enroll provided there is capacity.

ESK is an all-through school catering for nursery, primary and secondary pupils, culminating in the awarding of the European Baccalaureate as its secondary leaving qualification.

The school was founded with sections for - then - all four languages of the European Economic Community: French, German, Italian, and Dutch. Following the accession of Ireland and the UK to the European Community an English section was added and from 2005 on the Italian and Dutch section were taught-out and eventually closed. Since then there have been three language sections. Teachers for the anglophone section are seconded from Ireland, teachers for the francophone section from France and Belgium. There are also seconded teachers for some of the other Languages of the European Union to provide one hour of mother-tongue teaching per school day for the respective pupils.

== Notable people ==
=== Alumni ===
- Sarah Teichmann (1981-1993), bioinformatician

=== Former staff ===
- Tom Høyem, school Director (2000-2015)
- Daniel Gassner, school Director (2015-2024)

== See also ==
- European School
- European Schools
