= European School, Brussels I =

European School, Brussels 1
- Schola Europaea

Location
- Avenue du Vert Chasseur 46; Uccle, Brussels, B-1180; Belgium; 50.7998°N 4.3710°E

Information
- Type: European School
- Founded: 1958
- Operated by: The European Schools
- Director: David Tran
- Gender: Mixed
- Age range: 4 to 18(sometimes 19/20)
- Enrolment: 4,364 (2023-24)
  - Uccle: 3,402
  - Berkendael: 962
- Student Union/Association: The Pupils' Committee
- Sister Schools: 12 European Schools
- Diploma: European Baccalaureate
- Website: www.eeb1.com/en/

The European School, Brussels I (EEB1) is a European School located in Uccle, Brussels, Belgium (Uccle site), and Forest, Brussels, Belgium (Berkendael site). Originally the second of the European Schools to be founded, the European School, Brussels I, is today one of four in Brussels, and thirteen such schools across the European Union (EU). It is an all-through school, which exists primarily to provide an education to children of EU staff and officials based in Brussels leading to the European Baccalaureate as their secondary leaving qualification. Its alumni include the President of the European Commission, Ursula von der Leyen, and Boris Johnson, former Prime Minister of the United Kingdom. (Note: Von der Leyen and Johnson's status as alumni of the school was the first topic of conversation at their first face-to-face meeting at the UK prime minister's residence, following their appointments to their respective posts.)

== Language sections ==
In keeping with the multilingual and multicultural ethos and curriculum of the European Schools, the four Brussels-based European Schools are divided into language sections, with all schools required to host English, French and German sections. In addition to these, EEB1 comprises Danish, Hungarian, Latvian, Italian, Polish, and Spanish sections. (Note: Since the ESB1's establishment in 1958, the language sections operating within it have varied owing to local student demand, and the requirements imposed on the European Schools by new European Communities - and now European Union - Member States which then acceded to the international treaties governing them. Additionally, the opening of other European Schools in Brussels offered the possibility of dedicating the resources needed to run particular language sections to particular European Schools within the city.)

Applications for enrolment in the four Brussels-based European Schools are administered centrally, with all applications for those whose mother-tongue is Danish, Hungarian, Polish, Slovenian or Maltese referred automatically to the ESB1, along with applications for enrolment in the nursery and primary cycles of the Latvian section.

Students enrolled in the schools are generally instructed in the language of their respective section. Students must choose from either English, French or German for their second language, which becomes the language of instruction for History and Geography curriculum from the third-year secondary, as well as the optional Economics course available from fourth year. Students are also expected to take a third language upon entering the secondary cycle. Students whose mother-tongue is not covered by a language section, are enrolled in the English, French or German sections, and can opt for their mother-tongue in place of English, French or German studies, respectively.

== History ==
The first European School was founded in Luxembourg in 1953 as a private initiative of officials working for the institutions of the European Coal and Steel Community (ECSC), based within the jurisdiction, to provide an education to their children in their mother-tongues, whilst instructing them in a multilingual, multicultural environment. On 12 April 1957, the six founding states of the ECSC transformed the initiative into an intergovernmental organisation, signing the Statute of the European School, with the Board of Governors of the School being composed of the ministers of education of the six signatory states. The month prior, on 25 March 1957, the same states had signed the two Treaties of Rome, which established the European Economic Community (EEC) and European Atomic Energy Community (Euratom) on 1 January 1958. In a meeting of the foreign ministers of the six founding states of the three communities, held on 6 and 7 January 1958, Brussels and Luxembourg were selected as provisional seats of the Commissions and Council meetings of the EEC and Euratom. Consequently, at the request of the Belgian authorities, the Board of Governors of the European School agreed to the founding of a European School in Brussels.

Upon its opening at site on rue du Trône in September 1958, the school had just 26 pupils and six teachers. In September 1959, the school relocated to its current main campus, made available by the Belgian State, in the leafy Brussels suburb of Uccle.

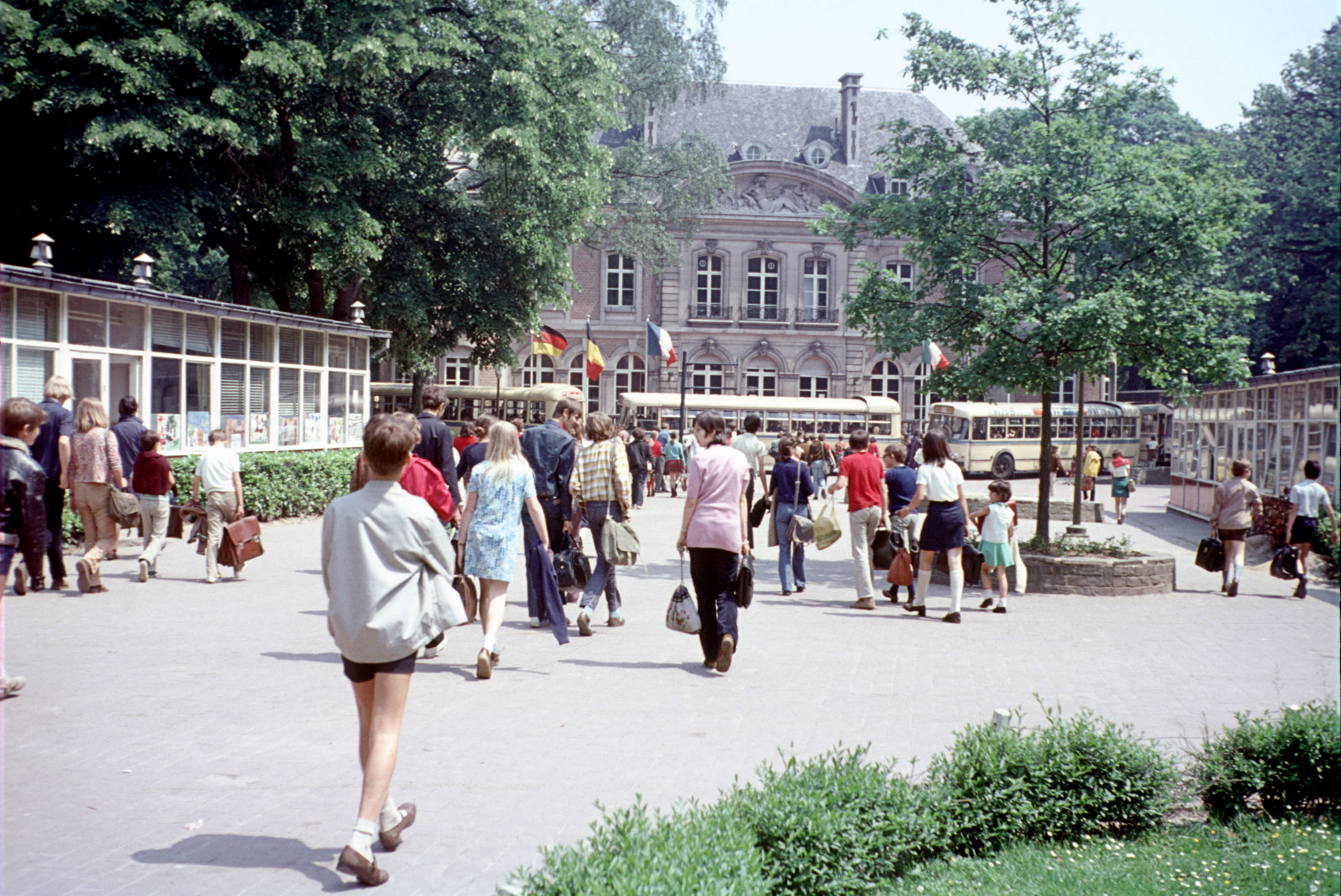
Flags of the then 6 European Communities states fly in front of the school's administrative building in 1971.

Demand for school places increased following the merging of the executives and Councils of the three European Communities (EC) in 1967, with most of their departments relocating permanently to Brussels, along with their staff and families. The first wave of enlargement of the EC in 1973, also saw the same States accede to the Statue of the European School, in order to provide an education to children of staff seconded or hired from their respective nations. Increasing demand for school places led to the establishment of a second School in Brussels in 1974. The incorporation of the EC into the European Union in 1993, and successive waves of enlargement of its membership, led to increased staff presence in the city. With new EC - and then EU - entrants each successively acceding to the international framework governing the Schools (repealed and replaced in 2002 by the Convention defining the Statute of the European Schools, originally signed in 1994), a third and fourth school were founded in Brussels in 1999 and 2007, respectively.

In 2015 the Boards of Governors of the European Schools agreed to the use of the European School, Brussels I's Berkandael site as a temporary overflow campus for the school up until the establishment of a fifth European School in Brussels on the site of the former NATO headquarters originally due in September 2019. In January 2020, the Belgian government approved the project, with the school expected to open in time for the 2021 academic year.

== Notable alumni ==
- Chris Adami
- Dick Annegarn
- Juan Becerra Acosta
- Ulrich Daldrup
- Florian Henckel von Donnersmarck
- Boris Johnson
- Jo Johnson
- Rachel Johnson
- Mark Leonard
- Antonio Loprieno
- Morten Helveg Petersen
- Federico Rampini
- Ursula von der Leyen
- Marina Wheeler
- Diederik Wissels
- Dario Alessi
- Max Gazzè

== See also ==
- European School of Bruxelles-Argenteuil
