= European School, Brussels IV =

- École Européenne, Bruxelles IV
- Schola Europaea, Bruxellae IV

Location
- Drève Sainte-Anne, 90; Laeken, Brussels, B-1020; Belgium
- Coordinates: 50°53′08″N 4°21′08″E

Information
- Type: European School
- Established: 2007
- Operated by: The European Schools
- Director: Marko Mattus
- Gender: Mixed
- Age range: 4 to 18
- Enrolment: 3,182 (2023-24)
- Student Union/Association: The Pupils' Committee
- Sister Schools: 12 European Schools
- Diploma: European Baccalaureate
- Website: www.eeb4.be

The European School, Brussels IV is one of the thirteen European Schools, and the fourth to be established within the city of Brussels, home to many European Union (EU) institutions. Opened in 2007, the school was initially based in the Brussels municipality of Forest, before moving to its purpose built campus in Laeken in 2012. The school combines nursery, primary and secondary education, with around 3,000 students enrolled at the start of the 2020–2021 academic year, spread over eight language sections (English, French, German, Dutch, Italian, Romanian, Bulgarian, and Estonian (up to the third year of secondary). The school prioritises the children of European Union (EU) staff for enrolment purposes, with others able to enrol provided there is capacity. Transport links to the school campus include Bockstael Station, which provides metro and suburban rail services.

== See also ==
- European School
- European Schools
- European School, Brussels I
- European School, Brussels II
- European School, Brussels III
- European School of Bruxelles-Argenteuil
