= Science for the contemporary world =

Spanish university subject

Spanish educational system
- Students' age: 16-17
- Sex: Male and female
- Course hours: 2 per week

Science for the contemporary world (SCW) is a subject of the Spanish education system which is mandatory for students in their first year of European Baccalaureate. The SCW's role is to give students the tools and information they need to think critically when examining scientific claims.

== Objectives ==
1. Learn the qualitative significant of some concepts, theories and laws to form opinions based on scientific and technological issues. Having an impact on the conditions of personal and global life being subject of social controversy and public debate.
2. Pose questions about scientific and actual issues and try to find an own solution to them using and selecting information on different sources.
3. Obtain, analyze and organize information of different scientific content. Use representations and models, guess, formulate hypotheses and make informed debate that will make informed decisions and communicate them to others with consistency, accuracy and clarity
4. Acquire a coherent and critical understanding of information technology, communication and entertainment present in the students’ environment, promoting judicious and rational use for the construction of scientific knowledge, the development of personal judgment and improvement of individual and collective wellbeing.
5. To argue, discuss and evaluate proposals and applications of scientific knowledge of social interest concerning health, environment, materials, energy sources, leisure, etc., in order to evaluate the scientific and technological means of mass communication and independent judgment to acquire information.
6. Implement attitudes and social values like creativity, curiosity, antidogmatism, the critical reflection and sensitivity to life and the environment, which are useful for personal advancement, relationships and social integration.
7. Assess the contribution of science and technology improving the quality of life, recognizing their contributions and limitations as a human endeavor whose ideas are constantly evolving and conditioned the cultural, social and economic context in which they develop.
8. Recognize some concrete examples interplay between scientific and technological development and the social, political, economic, religious, educational and cultural in which occurs the knowledge and its applications.

== Contents ==
1. Our Place in the Universe:
  - The origin of the Universe. The genesis of the elements: stardust. Exploration of the solar System.
  - The formation of the Earth and differentiation in layers. The global tectonics.
  - The origin of life. Prebiotic synthesis of the first organisms: main hypothesis.
  - The fixity of evolutionism. Natural selection Darwinian and current genetic explanation.
  - Of the fossil hominid Homo sapiens. The determinant genetic changes of human specificity.
2. Live longer, live better: - Health as a result of genetic factors, environmental and personal. The healthy lifestyles.
  - The constraints of medical research.
  - The patents. Health in countries of low development level.
  - The genetic revolution. The human genome. The Recombinant DNA technology and genetic engineering. Applications.
  - Assisted reproduction. Cloning and applications. Stem cells. Bioethics.
3. Towards sustainable management of the planet:
  - The overexploitation of resources: air, water, soil, living beings and energy sources. Water as limited resource.
  - The impacts: pollution, desertification, increased waste and biodiversity loss. The climate change.
  - Natural Risks. The most frequent disasters. Factors that increase the risks.
  - The problem of unlimited growth on a planet limited. General principles of economic, ecological and social sustainability. International commitments and civic responsibility.
4. New needs, new materials:
  - Mankind and use of materials. Location, production and consumption of materials: control resources.
  - Some natural materials. Metals, risks due to corrosion. The role and the problem of deforestation.
  - The scientific and technological development and society consumption: depletion of materials and appearance of new needs, from medicine to aviation.
  - The response of science and technology. New materials: polymers. New technologies: nanotechnology.
  - Environmental and energy use analysis materials: reducing, reusing and recycling. Rubbish.
5. The global village. In the information society to the knowledge society:
  - Processing, storage and exchange of information. The leap from analog to digital.
  - Numeric Data processing, signal and image.
  - Internet, an interconnected world. Compression & transmission of information. Privacy Control and data protection.
  - The technological revolution of communication: waves, cable, fiber optic, satellite, ADSL, mobile telephony, GPS, etc. Impact on everyday life.
