= Gediminas Budnikas =

Lithuanian basketball player (born 1944)

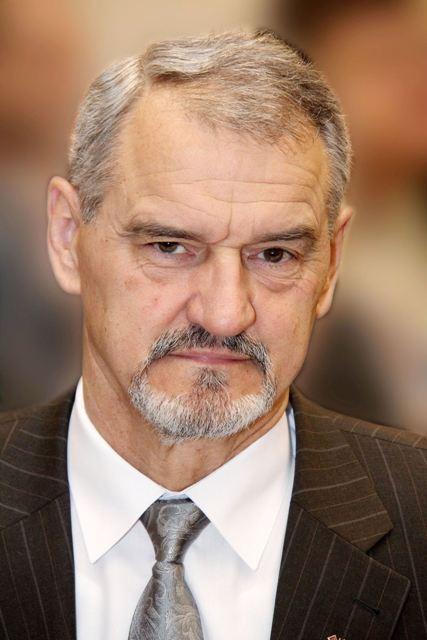

Personal information
- Born: February 11, 1944; Paąžuoliai, Ostland, Nazi Germany
- Height: 6 ft 7 in (201 cm)
- Weight: ~220 lb (100 kg)

Gediminas Budnikas (born February 11, 1944, in Paąžuoliai) is a retired Lithuanian basketball player, most notable for his career with Žalgiris from 1964 to 1973.

== Biography ==
Both partisans, his parents died on July 26, 1945, fighting for Lithuanian freedom. Gediminas and his brothers, Juozas and Antanas, grew up with relatives. In 1959, Gediminas graduated eight classes at Kaunas IV secondary school and finished Kaunas Food Industry Technical College. In 1979, he graduated from Vilnius University Kaunas Faculty of Humanities and, in 2005, in public administration at Kaunas University of Technology.

== Professional sports career ==
In 1962, Budnikas was invited to join Žalgiris team. In 1962-1974 he was a member of the Lithuanian Soviet Socialist Republic national team. In 1973, he became a USSR basketball championship prizewinner and later won the Lithuanian league eight times. In 1997 (Helsinki), 1998 (Montevideo) and in 2001 (Ljubljana) he was a member of the Lithuania seniors basketball world champion team. Budnikas also won the European seniors championship in Riga in 2000.

He is a member of the Žalgiris board.
