= Juan Acosta =

Juan Acosta may refer to:

- Juan Acosta (athlete) (1907–1994), Chilean long-distance runner
- Juan Acosta (footballer) (born 1993), Uruguayan footballer
- Juan F. Acosta (1890–1968), Puerto Rican composer and music teacher
- Juan Becerra Acosta (born 1973), Mexican journalist
