= European School, Brussels III =

- Schola Europaea

Location
- Boulevard du Triomphe, 135; Ixelles, Brussels, 1050; Belgium
- Coordinates: 50.8213°N 4.4005°E

Information
- Type: European School
- Established: 1999
- Operated by: The European Schools
- Director: Micheline Sciberras
- Gender: Mixed
- Age range: 4 to 18
- Enrolment: 3,237 (2023-2024)
- Student Union/Association: The Pupils' Committee
- Sister Schools: 12 European Schools
- Diploma: European Baccalaureate
- Website: www.eeb3.eu

The European School, Brussels III is one of the thirteen European Schools and one of the four located in Brussels. Founded in 1999, it is located in the Brussels municipality of Ixelles (Elsene). The school combines nursery, primary and secondary education, with 3,097 students enrolled at the start of the 2018–2019 academic year, spread over seven language sections (English, French, German, Spanish, Dutch, Greek and Czech). The school priotises the children of European Union (EU) staff for enrolment purposes, with others able to enrol provided there is capacity. Transport links to the school campus include Delta station, Hankar station and Arsenal/Arsenaal station which provide metro, bus, tram and suburban rail services.

== History ==
The first European School in Brussels was founded in 1958 with the primary purpose of providing an education to the children of officials of the Brussels-based institutions of the European Economic Community and European Atomic Energy Community, which had been established that same year. Subsequent enlargement of the European Communities - and later European Union -, the consolidation of European institutions in Brussels, and increasing staff numbers to correspond to deepening levels of European integration all increased demand for places within the European School system in Brussels. This resulted in the addition of a second school in Brussels in 1974, before the European School, Brussels III was founded in 1999.

Following the so-called "Big Bang" EU enlargement of 2004 and the consequent arrival of additional EU staff, a surplus of students attempting to enrol in the school led to the opening of the European School, Brussels IV in the Brussels suburb of Laeken. A fifth European School, on the site of the former NATO headquarters, was due to open in September 2019, and has since been delayed to September 2021.

== See also ==
- European School, Brussels I
- European School, Brussels II
- European School, Brussels IV
- European School of Bruxelles-Argenteuil
