= European School, Brussels II =

- Schola Europaea

Location
- Avenue Oscar Jespers, 75; Woluwe-Saint-Lambert, Brussels; Belgium
- Coordinates: 50°51′29″N 4°26′35″E

Information
- Type: European School
- Established: 1974
- Operated by: The European Schools
- Director: Kamila Malik
- Gender: Mixed
- Age range: 4 to 18
- Enrolment: 3,824 (2023-24)
  - Woluwe: 3,172
  - Evere: 652
- Student Union/Association: The Pupils' Committee of Brussels II (Comité des Elèves - CDE)
- Sister Schools: 12 European Schools
- Diploma: European Baccalaureate
- Website: www.eeb2.be

The European School, Brussels II is one of thirteen European Schools in the European Union (EU), and of four in Brussels. It is situated on Avenue Oscar Jespers, in the Brussels suburb of Woluwe-Saint-Lambert.

The school is an all-through school catering for nursery, primary and secondary pupils, culminating in the awarding of the European Baccalaureate as its secondary leaving qualification. Pupils of the school are enrolled in either the Dutch, English, French, German, Italian, Finnish, Swedish, Lithuanian, Portuguese, Latvian or Estonian language sections. Founded in 1974 after the first enlargement of the European Communities, the European School, Brussels II prioritises, the children of EU staff for enrolment purposes. Children of non-EU staff may enrol provided there is capacity. However, the School has been filled above its theoretical student capacity for multiple years. Enrolment in the four Brussels based European Schools is administered centrally.

== See also ==
- European School
- European Schools
- European School, Brussels I
- European School, Brussels III
- European School, Brussels IV
- European School of Bruxelles-Argenteuil
