= Daldrup =

Daldrup is a surname. Notable people with the surname include:

- Bernhard Daldrup (born 1956), German politician
- Ulrich Daldrup (born 1947), German politician
