= Kaunas University of Technology =

Public university in Kaunas, Lithuania

- Kauno technologijos universitetas
- Motto: Scientia, ingenium, virtus
- Motto in English: Science, creativity, virtue!
- Type: public
- Established: 1922; 104 years ago
- Affiliations: ECIU, EUA, SEFI, NORDTEK
- Rector: Eugenijus Valatka
- Students: more than 9,000 (according to 2019 data)
- Doctoral students: more than 300 (according to 2019 data)
- Location: Kaunas, Lithuania; 54°53′55″N 23°54′44″E
- Website: ktu.edu

Kaunas University of Technology Science and Technology Center

Kaunas University of Technology (KTU) is the leading technological university in the Baltic States, according to the 2025 Times Higher Education rankings.

KTU offers study programmes and conducts research across STEAM disciplines (technology, engineering, computer science, physical sciences and mathematics), as well as in business and management, social sciences, humanities, health sciences, the arts and education.

The university carries out both applied and fundamental research, participates in national and international projects, and collaborates with organisations from the public and private sectors.

The university is located in Kaunas, Lithuania. KTU traces its origins to the University of Lithuania, established in 1922.

== History ==
=== Early years ===
The origins of the KTU go back to the University of Lithuania, which was established on 16 February 1922. The university was renamed, Vytautas Magnus University on 8 June 1930. The university consisted of seven faculties: the Faculty of Theology and Philosophy, the Faculty of Evangelical Theology, the Faculty of Humanities, the Faculty of Law, the Faculty of Mathematics and Natural Sciences, the Faculty of Medicine, and the Faculty of Technology. The beginning of 1940 saw the reorganization of the Vytautas Magnus University with The Faculties of Law and Humanities being transferred to the University of Vilnius.

=== World War II and the Soviet Era ===
On 21 August 1940, following Soviet occupation, the university was renamed to the University of Kaunas. The Faculty of Mathematics and Natural Sciences was transferred to the University of Vilnius in the autumn of 1940. After the German occupation in 1941, the university was once again renamed to Vytautas Magnus University with five faculties: theology, philosophy, technology, civil engineering, and mathematics. The university closed on 17 March 1943,.

The Soviet government reopened the University on 13 November 1944. The university operated under the name, Kaunas National Vytautas Magnus University until 1946. The Faculty of History and Theology closed in June 1949. The University of Kaunas was reorganized into Kaunas Polytechnic Institute (KPI) and Kaunas Medical Institute in 1950. Throughout the Soviet era, the KPI resisted Russification and kept teaching in the Lithuanian language.

Under the influence of Perestroika, the Lithuanian SSR reinstated the School's "University" status. Vytautas Magnus University was re-established as a separate university from KPI in 1989. KPI was renamed to its current name, Kaunas University of Technology in 1990.

=== Since 1990 ===
Following the restoration of independence, the institution adopted Western standards. The university started implementing a two-level degree program of higher education and a new procedure for awarding research degrees and academic titles in 1992. The university joined Magna Charta of the European Universities and became a member of the European University Association and the International Association of Universities in 1998.

== Education ==
KTU Student Campus

The Kaunas University of Technology has 122 study programmes, of which 48 are bachelor's, 54 are master's, 19 are doctoral and 1 is a non-degree student programme. Of the 122 offered programmes, 56 are taught in English. The university has more than 9,000 students, of which more than 6,600 are bachelor's, 2,000 are master's and 320 are doctoral students. 6.5 percent of the student population is foreign. KTU also engages in research of physical, technological, and social sciences, and experimental development, while research of biomedical sciences and humanities is promoted.

=== Institutes ===
University rankings

Global – Overall
- QS World: 741-750 (2026)
- THE World: 1201–1500 (2024)
- USNWR Global: =1694 (2023)

KTU Aula

Faculty of Chemical Technology

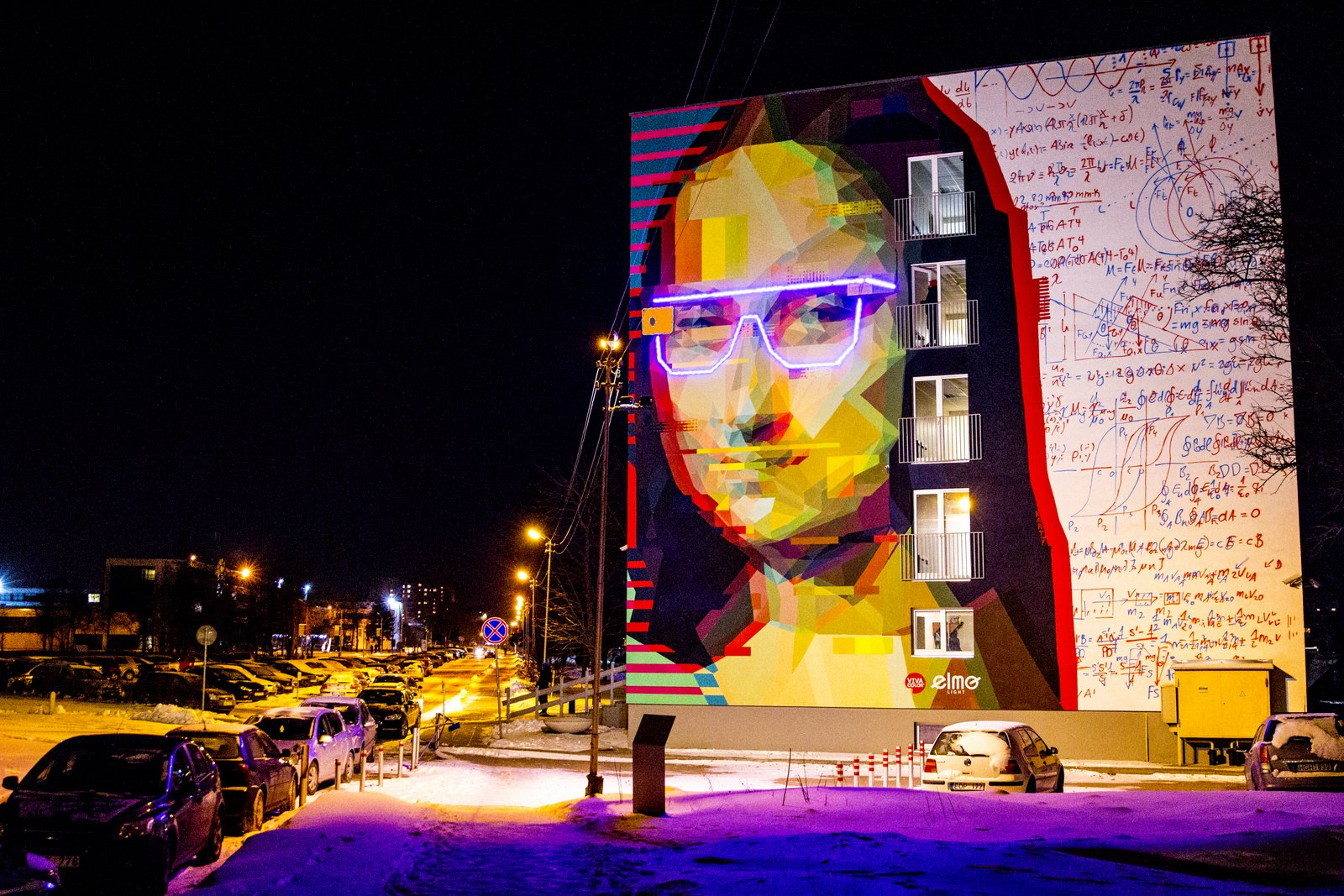
Image of Mona Lisa and mathematical operations depicted on KTU student's dormitory wall in 2017

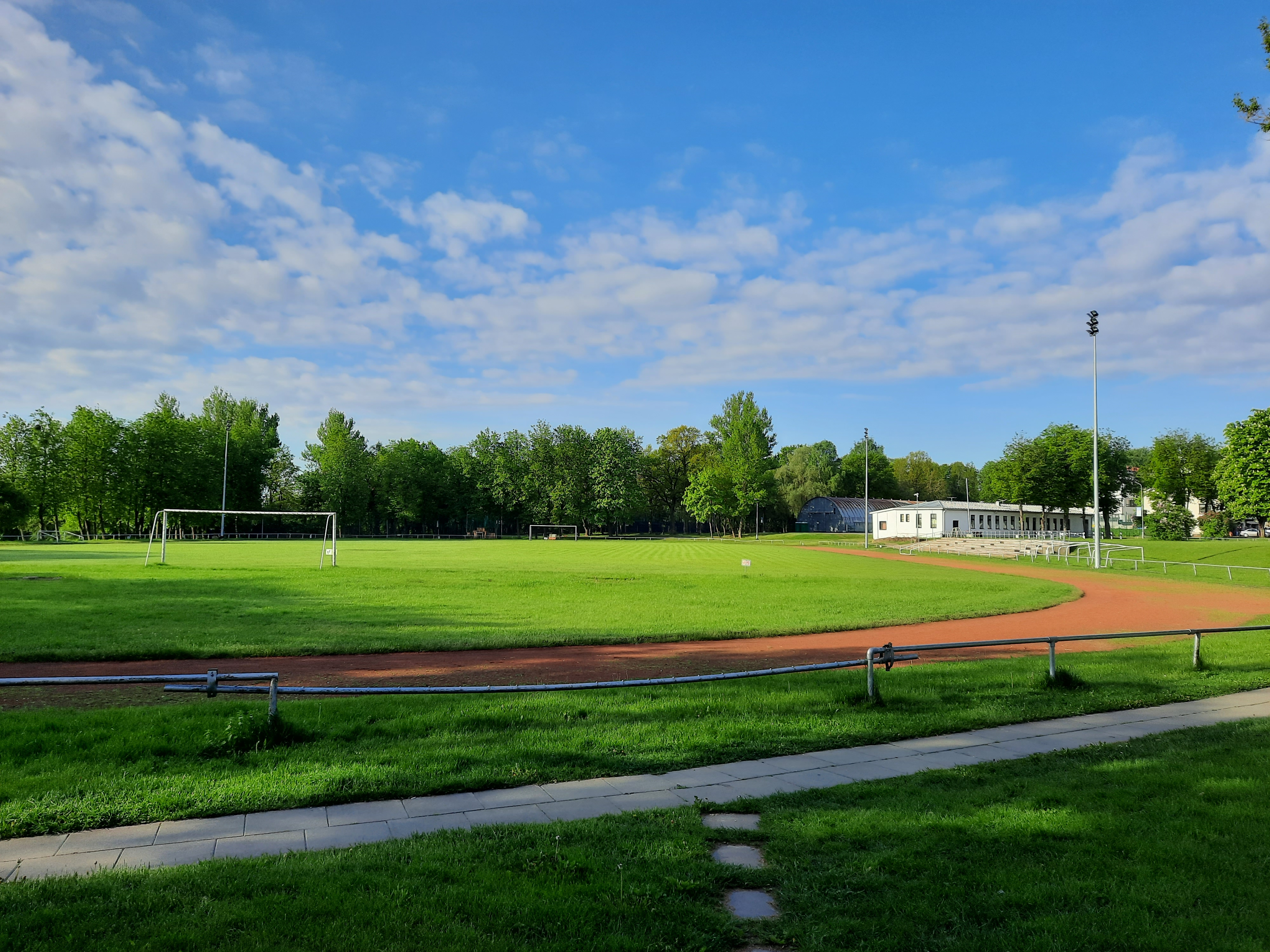
KTU stadium

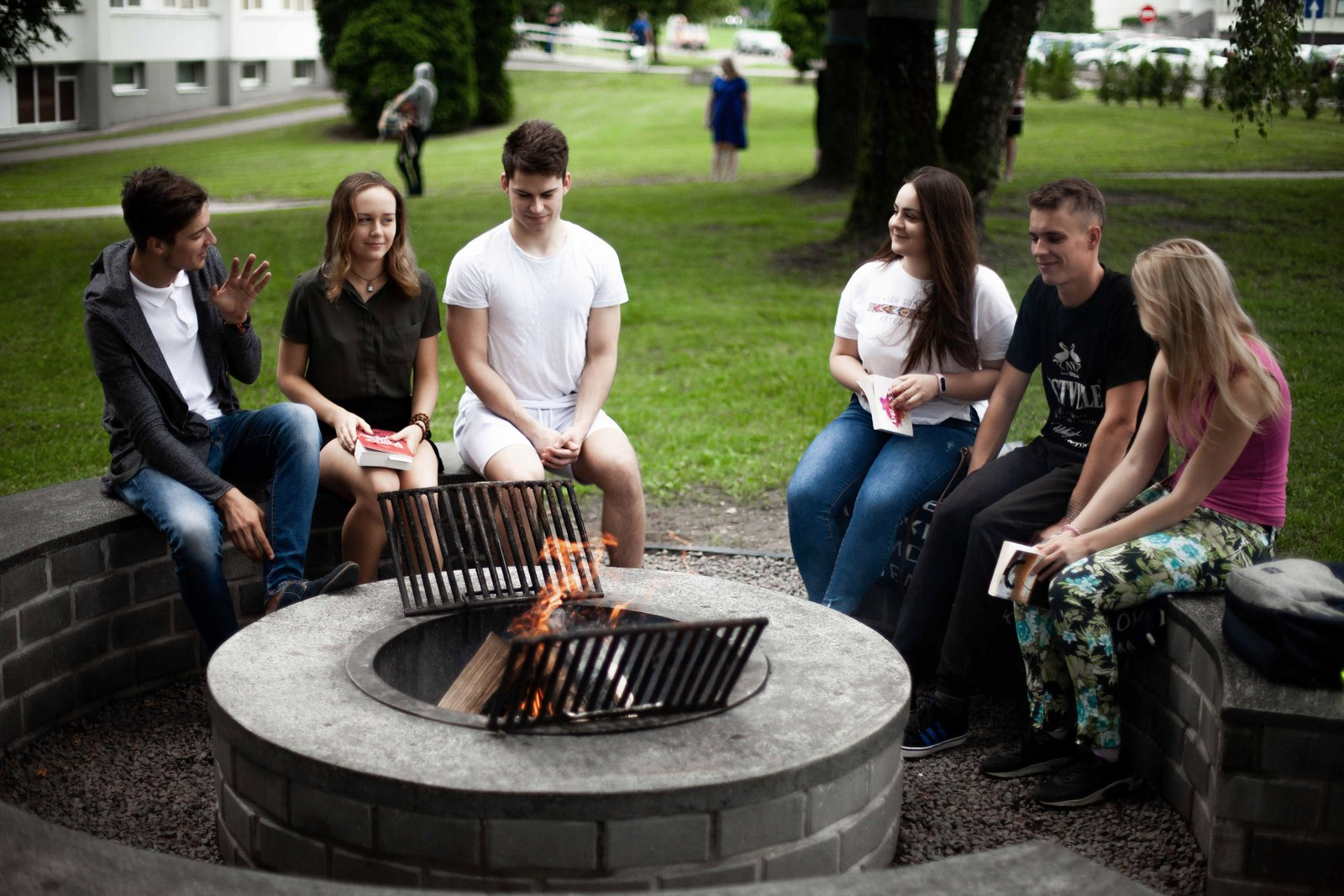
KTU students during free time

- Biomedical Engineering Institute
- Institute of Aviation & Aeronautical
- Food Institute
- Institute of Architecture and Construction
- Institute of Environmental Engineering
- Institute of Materials Science
- Institute of Mechatronics
- Kazimieras Baršauskas Ultrasound Research Institute
- Health Telematics Science Institute

=== Education in English ===
The following programs are offered entirely in English for bachelor's and master's levels.

==== Bachelor's level programs ====
- Faculty of Chemical Technology
  - Chemical Technology and Engineering
  - Food Science and Technology
- School of Economics and Business
  - Business Digitization Management
- Faculty of Electrical and Electronics Engineering
  - Electronic and Electrical Engineering
  - Intelligent Robotics Systems
  - Renewable Energy Engineering
- Faculty of Informatics
  - Artificial Intelligence
  - Informatics
- Faculty of Mathematics and Natural Sciences
  - Materials Physics and Nanotechnologies
- Faculty of Mechanical Engineering and Design
  - Aviation Engineering
  - Mechanical Engineering
  - Mechatronics
  - Vehicle Engineering
- Faculty of Social Sciences, Arts and Humanities
  - Communication Studies and Information Management Technologies
  - New Media Language
  - Public Governance and Civil Society
- Faculty of Civil Engineering and Architecture
  - Architecture
  - Civil Engineering

==== Master's level programs ====
- Faculty of Chemical Technology
  - Applied Chemistry
  - Chemical Engineering
  - Environmental Engineering
  - Food Science and Safety
  - Industrial Biotechnology
- School of Economics and Business
  - Accounting and Auditing
  - International Business
- Faculty of Electrical and Electronics Engineering
  - Biomedical Engineering
  - Control Technologies
  - Electronics Engineering
  - Energy Technologies and Economics
- Faculty of Informatics
  - Artificial Intelligence in Computer Science
- Faculty of Mathematics and Natural Sciences
  - Materials Physics
  - Medical Physics
- Faculty of Mechanical Engineering and Design
  - Aeronautical Engineering
  - Industrial Engineering and Management
  - Mechanical Engineering
  - Mechatronics
  - Sustainable Management and Production
  - Vehicle Engineering
- Faculty of Social Sciences, Arts and Humanities
  - Public Policy and Security
  - Translation and Localization of Technical Texts
- Faculty of Civil Engineering and Architecture
  - Architecture
  - Structural and Building Products Engineering
- Panevėžys Faculty of Technologies and Business
  - Control Technologies

== Events ==
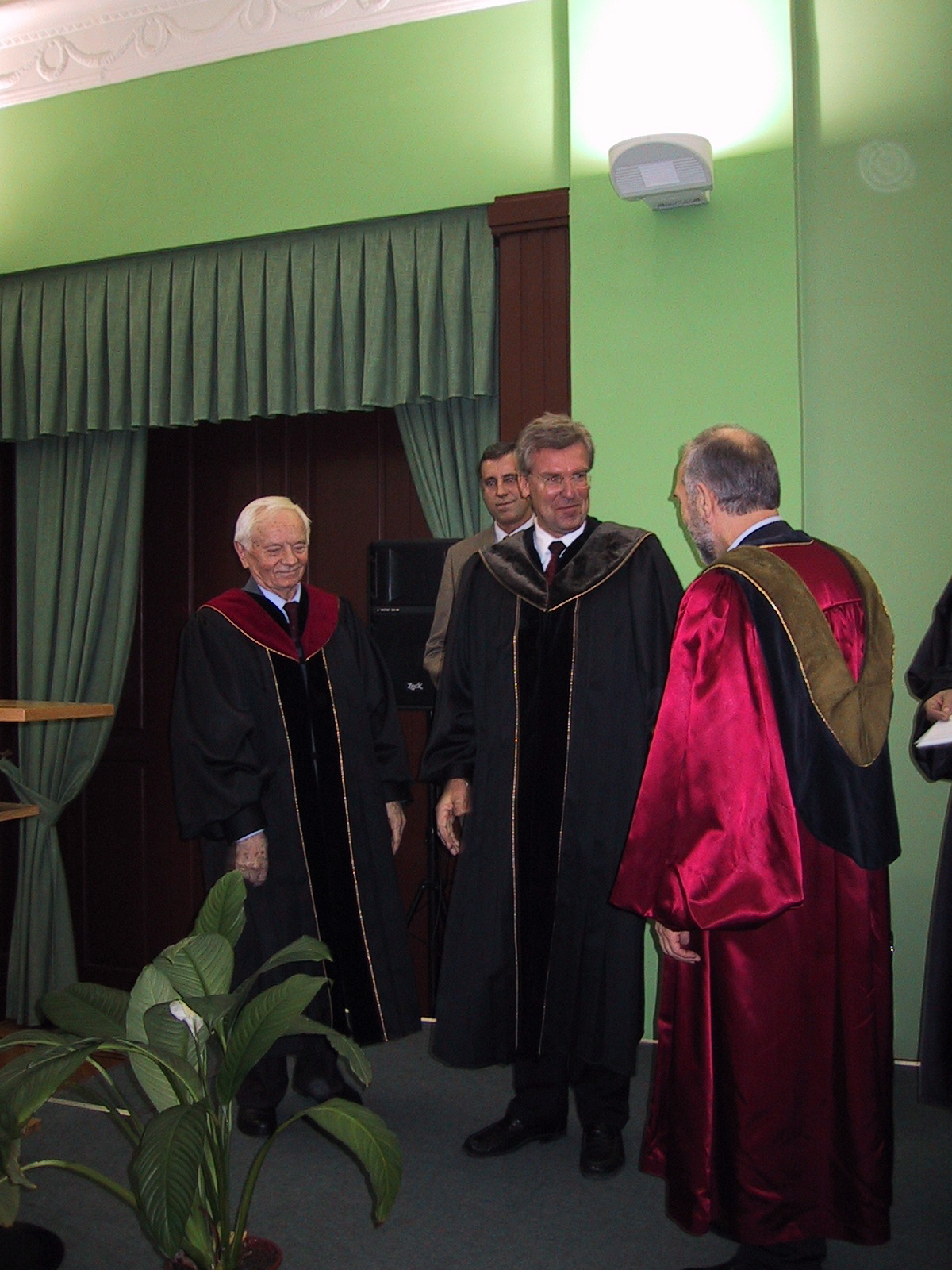
Awarding ceremony of KTU Doctor Honoris Causa to Ulrich Daldrup, 2007

- In 1998 the KTU Regional Business Incubator was established. It is the first technology business incubator in Lithuania, providing support to enterprises interested in starting new businesses.
- In 2008, Rymantas Jonas Kažys was awarded the National Award for Partnership Advancement for creating technologies of supersonic measurement and diagnostics and for the commencement of European scientific research and practice.
- In 2010, Jurgis Kazimieras Staniškis, head of the Institute of Environmental Engineering, was awarded the Baltic Sea Award 2010. Staniškis is currently the only Lithuanian scientist to receive this award.
- In 2010 an agreement on the Integrated Science, Studies and Business Center (Valley) of Santaka sponsorship of the first investment project was signed. The implementation of this project will result in the establishment of a world-class National open-access R&D Center within the KTU Student Campus in Kaunas. The center will primarily focus on such areas as sustainable chemistry, mechatronics, information and communication technology, and sustainable energy resources, which are a substantial part of the Lithuanian economy and comprise a significant part of its export.
- On 13 October 2017, Klaus Schwab, head of the World Economic Forum, became the 45th Honorary Doctor of Kaunas University of Technology for "spreading the knowledge on the economy and innovative ideas, for fostering social entrepreneurship and support for young businesses, and for his contribution into developing the concept of the Fourth Industrial Revolution".
- On 8 December 2023, KTU experienced a cyber attack. Personal information such as names, ID numbers, phone numbers, addresses, and passport data was leaked on the dark web.
