= Scandinavian School of Brussels =

International school in Belgium

Scandinavian School of Brussels (SSB; Finnish: Brysselin Skandinaavinen koulu, French: École Reine Astrid) was an international school in Waterloo, Belgium. It served students ages 2–19. The school had preschool through upper secondary levels, and had separate academic programmes for Denmark, Finland, Norway, and Sweden. SSB offered the International Baccalaureate (IB) Diploma Programme that was taught in more than 4000 schools in over 140 countries. Its French name refers to Queen Astrid of Sweden.

Its campus was located on the Argenteuil estate, which it shared with, "Den norske skolen i Brussel", the Queen Elisabeth Music Chapel, and the European School of Bruxelles-Argenteuil.

It opened in 1973 and closed in 2020.

== Campus and operations ==
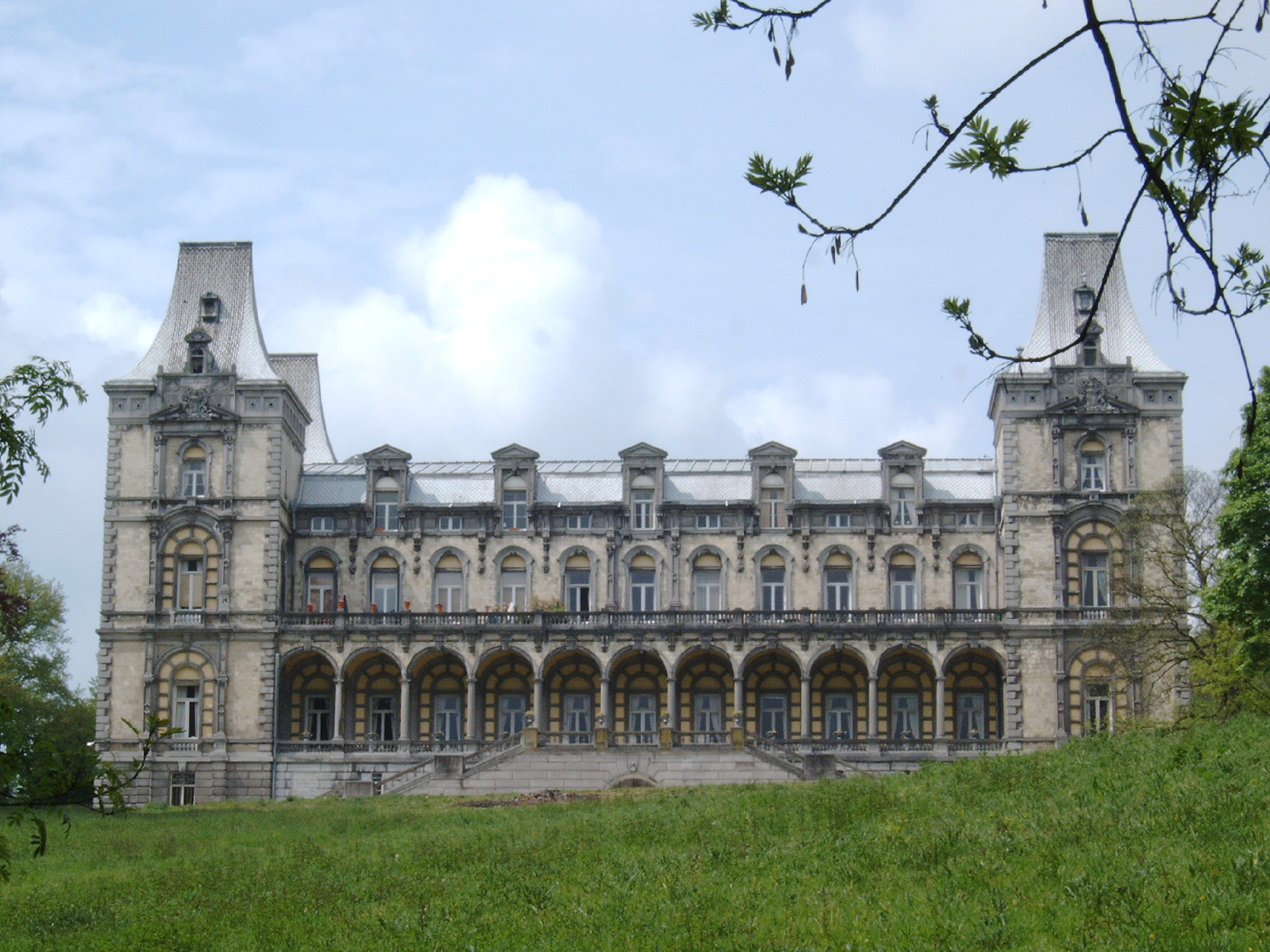
Château d'Argenteuil, which housed the school's canteen and boarding facility

SSB used the following buildings:

- Main building - School administration, library, Preschool, levels 3-9 (compulsory education), upper secondary, and the gymnasium for students in levels 1-3
- Paviljong - The play area
- Compulsory FS-2 building - Houses the music area, the sports hall, and classrooms for compulsory levels FS-2
- Château d'Argenteuil - Used as the boarding facility and canteen

SSB also assigned some boarding students to area families who participated in homestay arrangements.

== Student body ==
Its students originated from Denmark, Finland, Norway, and Sweden. As of 2015 it had about 300 students, most of whom reside in Waterloo, Lasne, and Sint-Genesius-Rode, with some living in central Brussels.

The school also offered home language courses to 100 other students.

== Closure ==
The school closed in 2020. It consolidated into the Swedish section of the European School of Bruxelles-Argenteuil.
