= Russian Embassy School in Brussels =

School in Brussels, Belgium

- Russian: Школа Посольства России в Бельгии

Information
- School type: International school

The Russian Embassy School in Brussels (Russian: Средняя общеобразовательная школа Посольства России в Бельгии, romanized: Srednyaya obshcheobrazovatel'naya shkola Posol'stva Rossii v Bel'gii or Russian: Школа Посольства России в Бельгии, romanized: Shkola Posol'stva Rossii v Bel'gii) is a Russian international school in the municipality of Uccle in Brussels, Belgium.
