= Bas Kast =

German science writer (born 1973)

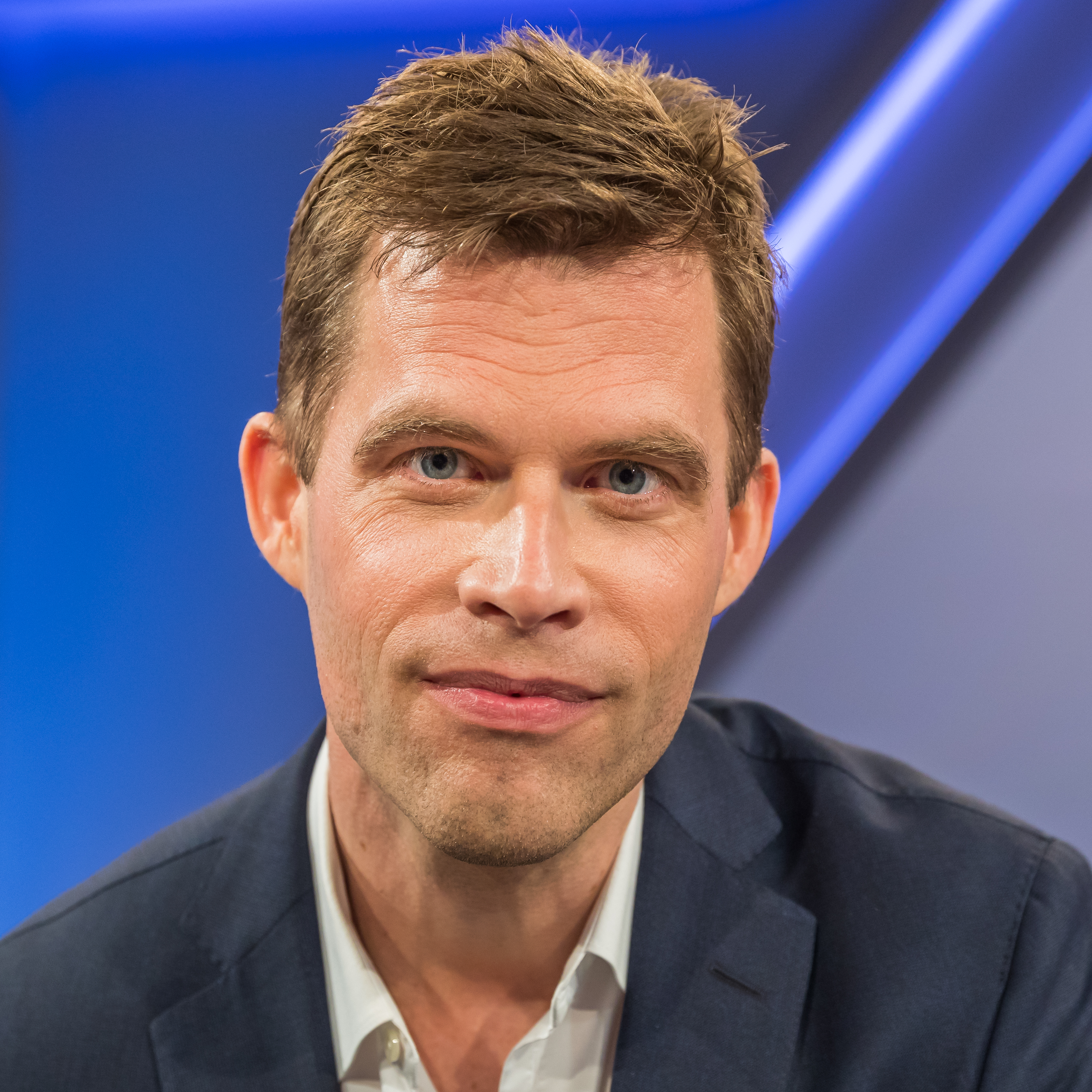
- Born: Bas Kast; 16 January 1973 (age 53)
- Education: European School Munich
- Occupations: Author; Journalist
- Employer: Tagesspiegel

Bas Kast (born 1973 in Landau, residence in Rottendorf) is a German-Dutch science writer. He studied psychology and biology at the University of Konstanz and at the Massachusetts Institute of Technology. Working as a freelancer for the German weekly newspaper Die Zeit and other magazines, he later became an editor and reporter for the Berlin-based newspaper Der Tagesspiegel. His articles have earned him a number of national and international prizes. Kast has written several popular science books, some of which became best selling books that have been translated in numerous languages.

== Articles (English) ==
- "Decisions, decisions...", Nature, 2001 May 10;411(6834):126-8.
- "The best supporting actors", Nature, 2001 Aug 16;412(6848):674-6.

== Awards ==
- Axel-Springer-Preis 2002 for the article "What is Empathy?"
- European Science Writers Award 2006
- freshwater snail Tylomelania baskasti is named in honor of Bas Kast

== Books ==
- Revolution im Kopf (2003)
- Die Liebe und wie sich Leidenschaft erklärt (2004)
- Wie der Bauch dem Kopf beim Denken hilft (2007)
- Lauras Schweigen (2011) [Novel published using the alias Niels Nefarius]
- Ich weiß nicht, was ich wollen soll (2012)
- Und plötzlich macht es KLICK! (2015)
- Der Ernährungskompass. Das Fazit aller wissenschaftlichen Studien zum Thema Ernährung. (2018)
- Der Ernährungskompass – Das Kochbuch. (2019)
- Das Buch eines Sommers. Werde, wer du bist. (2020)
- Kompass für die Seele. Das Fazit neuester Studien zu Resilienz und innerer Stärke, C. Bertelsmann Verlag, München (2023)
