= Karin Giegerich =

German actress (born 1963)

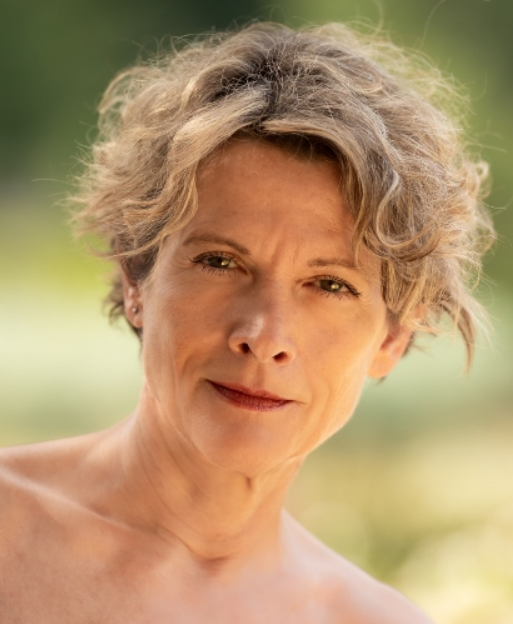
- Karin Giegerich in 2010
- Born: 15 May 1963 (age 63); Sorengo, Switzerland
- Occupation: Actress
- Years active: 1992-present

Karin Giegerich (born 15 May 1963) is a German actress. She appeared in more than sixty films since 1992.
