= European School of Bruxelles-Argenteuil =

- École Européenne de Bruxelles-Argenteuil

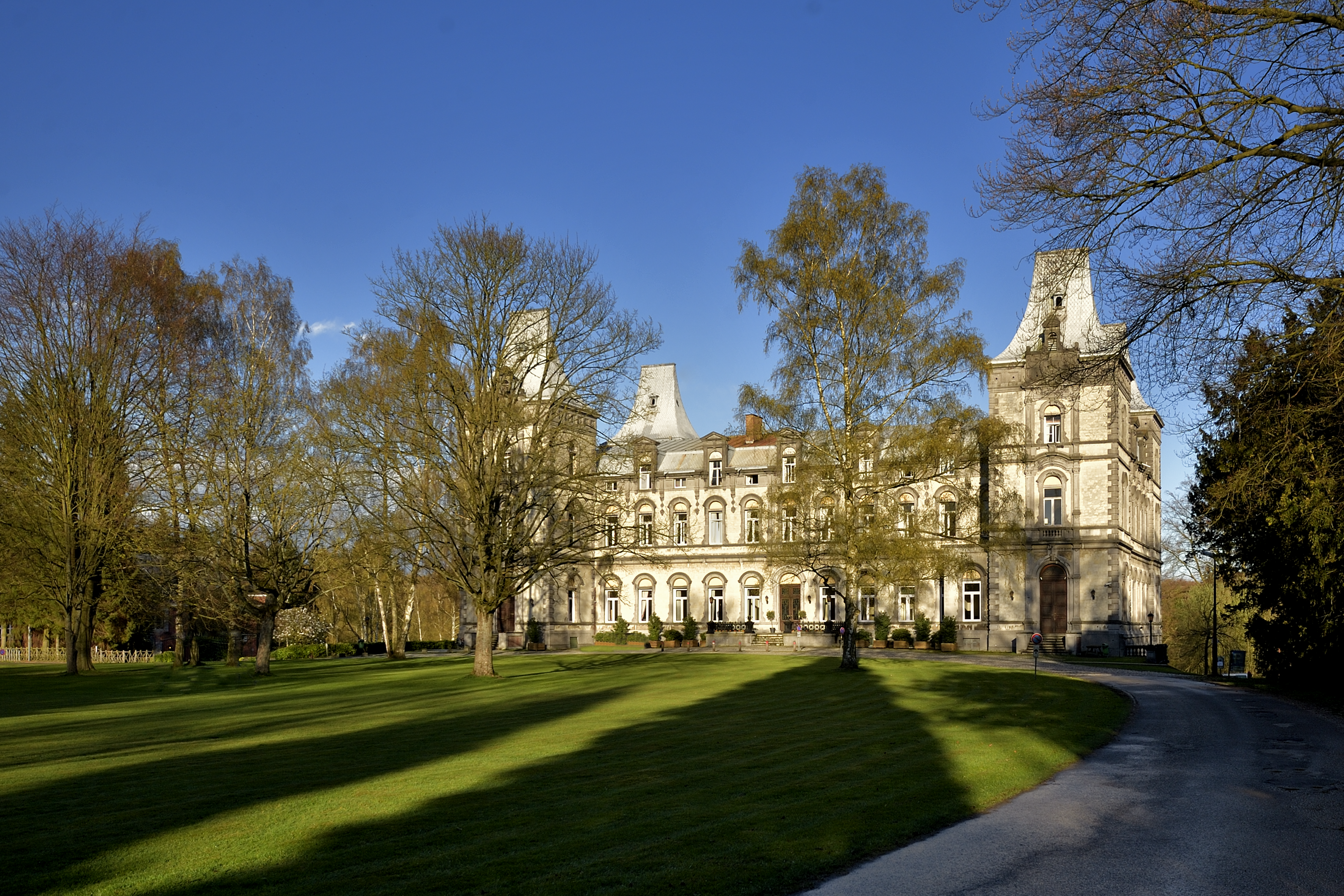

Location
- Square d’Argenteuil 5 Waterloo, 1410; Belgium; 50.717460°N 4.428200°E

Information
- Other name: EEBA
- Established: 2016
- Principal: Félix de Merode
- Gender: Mixed
- Age range: 2,5 to 18
- Enrolment: 400 (2026-2027)
  - Nursery: 40
  - Primary: 155
  - Secondary: 205
- Accreditation: Accredited by the European Schools
- Affiliations: Scandinavian School of Brussels; Lycée Molière
- Website: europeanschool.be

The European School of Bruxelles-Argenteuil (French: École Européenne de Bruxelles-Argenteuil), also known as the EEBA, is a private, Accredited European School located on the grounds of the Château d'Argenteuil, in Waterloo, Wallonia, Belgium. Founded in 2016, the EEBA is a partnership between Brussels private school Lycée Molière, and the Scandinavian School of Brussels (SSB). The EEBA, through its partnership with the SSB, offers its students the International Baccalaureate as its secondary leaving qualification, as well as the European Baccalaureate (S6-S7). The school offers education to nursery, primary and secondary students. (2,5 to 18 years old).

== History ==
=== European Schools ===
Since 1958, Brussels has played host to a growing number of institutions and bodies of the European Communities (EC) - now European Union (EU). In 1958, the European School, Brussels I (ESB1) opened its doors with the primary purpose of providing an education to the children of the staff of said institutions. The ESB1, was to be unusual in that it was to be the second in a network of schools directly governed and financed through a new separate intergovernmental organisation, originally established by the 1957 Statue of the European School - since repealed and replaced by the 1994 Convention Defining the Statute of the European Schools. The Board of Governors of the school network was to be composed of education ministers of the signatory states. The European Schools committed themselves to a multilingual and multicultural pedagogical approach, leading to the European Baccalaureate - a bilingual secondary leaving qualification overseen by the Board of Governors.

=== High demand ===
As member states each acceded to the EC - and, later, the EU - they would successively sign up to the treaties governing the European Schools in order to guarantee an education to the children of staff of their respective nationalities. Simultaneously increased European institutional presence and staff numbers in Brussels put a strain on the European Schools in the city. Between the founding of the ESB1 and 2007, three more European Schools were founded in Brussels. In 2015, the European Schools authorised a fifth school.

In the years since the European Schools' founding, its curriculum, ethos, and qualification had become popular amongst families of staff of other international institutions and corporations in Brussels, as well as locals. However, with the European Schools legally obligated to provide an education to the children of EU staff first, there was often little availability of school places.

=== Belgium's first Accredited European School ===
In 2013, seeking a solution to the high demand for European School places in Brussels, the Board of Governors of the European Schools requested the Belgian state permit the creation of the Belgium's first "Accredited European School". Taking advantage of regulations agreed by the Board of Governors in 2005, such a school would be accredited to provide the European Schools' curriculum, and the European Baccalaureate, whilst being under national jurisdiction and independently financed. It would join a network of thirteen existing such Accredited European Schools across the EU.

Responding to the Belgian government's calls, the Belgian private school, "Lycée Molière", and the Scandinavian School of Brussels, proposed a partnership venture for the creation of an Accredited European School. In September 2016, the English-language primary school section of the European School of Bruxelles-Argenteuil opened its doors on the grounds of the Château d'Argenteuil, in Waterloo, 15 km south of Brussels. From September 2017, the EEBA was able to provide education to secondary level education for students whose mother-tongue was English, French, or Swedish.

== Accreditation ==
The Board of Governors of the European Schools signed an accreditation agreement with the EEBA on 13 March 2018, valid until 31 August 2021, when upon it will require renewal. In concordance with the rigorous accreditation process, accredited schools are routinely audited by the Boards of Inspectors of the European Schools, with the EEBA's last audit taking place between 17 and 21 September 2018. Today the school offers the European Baccalaureate programme years (sixth and seventh year secondary) as well and the International Baccalaureate.

== Campus and Facilities ==
The EEBA is located on the grounds of the Château d’Argenteuil, a nineteenth century estate, with extensive park and woodland. The school is equipped with modern class rooms and laboratories, an inside sports hall, outdoor sport courts and recreational grounds. The Château itself hosts the school canteen, music room, art room, european hours workshops such as textile, woodwork.

== See also ==
- Accredited European School
- European Baccalaureate
- International Baccalaureate
- European Schools
- Private School in Waterloo
- International Schools
