= Ulrich Daldrup =

German political leader and mayor

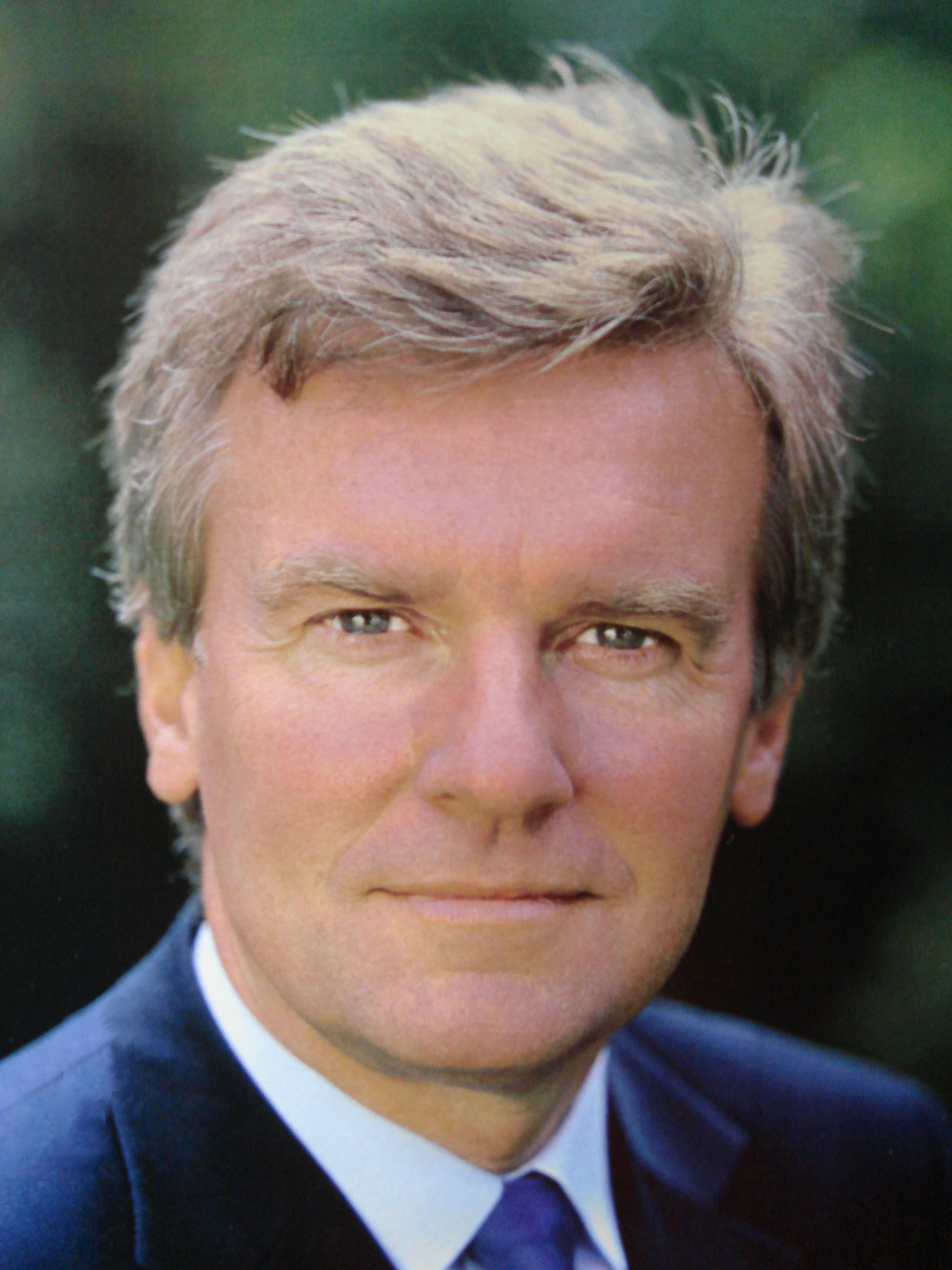
Ulrich Daldrup

Ulrich Daldrup (born 27 September 1947) is a former political leader and mayor of the German city of Aachen. He is an expert in International Cooperation and in Humanitarian Aid, and worked and lived many years in Africa and Asia.

== Youth ==
Daldrup was born in Porta Westfalica, Germany, and grew up in Brussels, Belgium where his father Franz Daldrup had been delegated in 1958 by then German Minister of Economic Affairs, Ludwig Erhard, to assist in the foundation of the European Economic Community. Daldrup graduated from the European School, Brussels I in 1965, obtaining his European Baccalaureate. Subsequently, he undertook a one-year apprenticeship in banking with Brussels Lambert Bank. In 1971 he finished his study of chemistry and of economics at the Technical University of Aachen with two master's degrees/Diplomas (in chemistry and in economics) and a PhD. In 1972 he married Elfi Herrny.

== International career ==
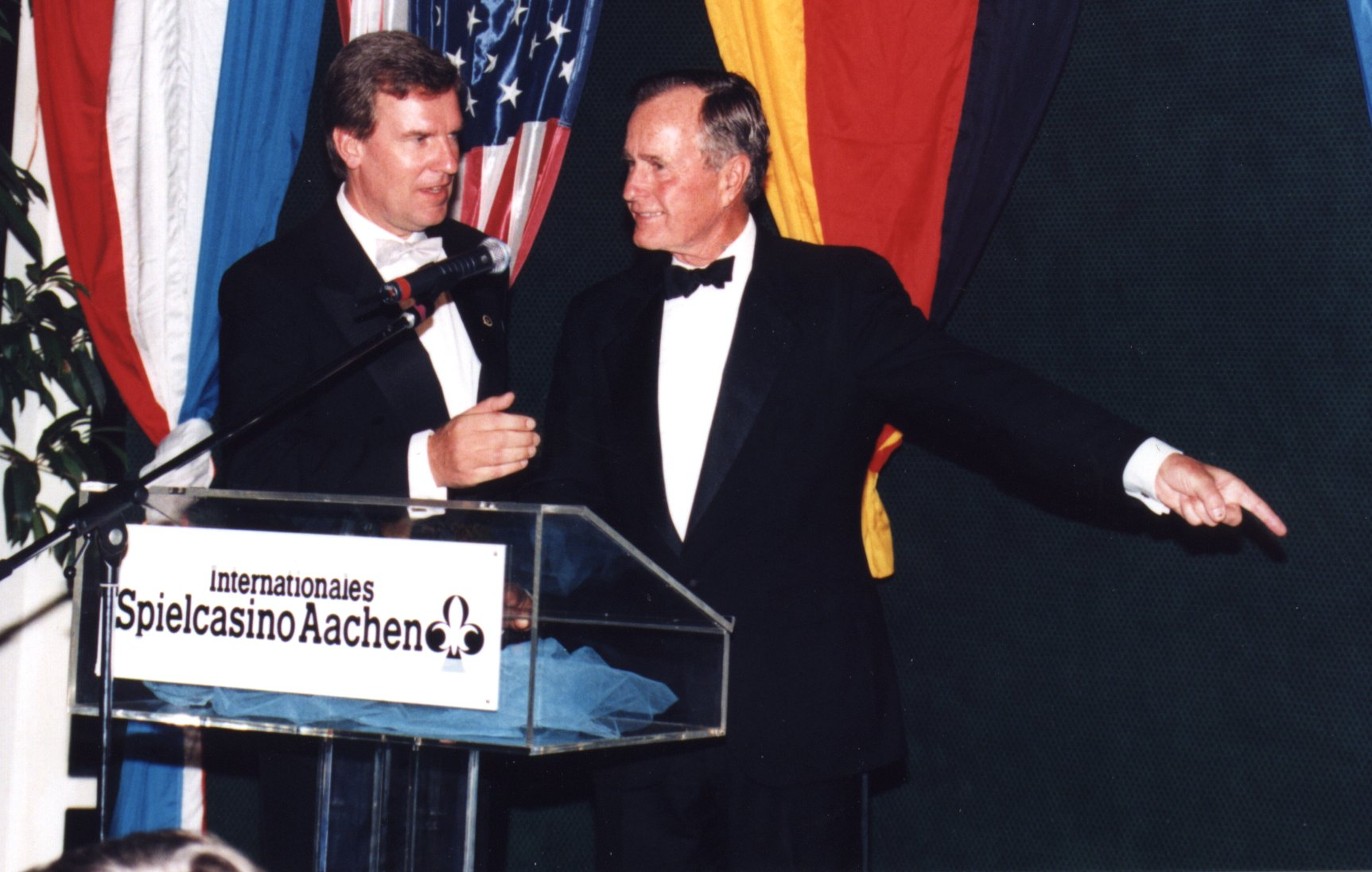
Ulrich Daldrup welcomes President George H. W. Bush in Aachen at Global Panel Conference

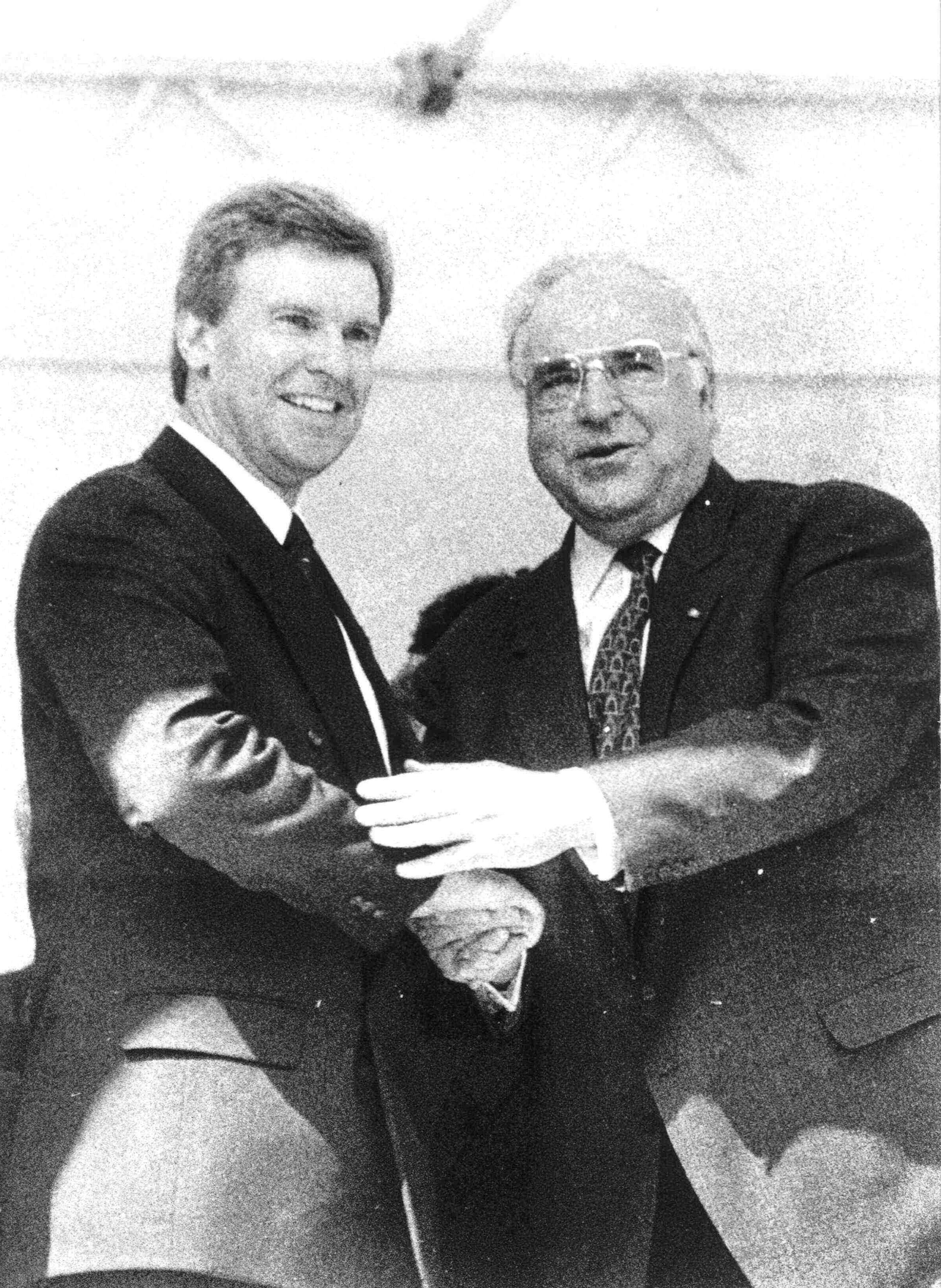
Ulrich Daldrup welcomes German Chancellor Helmut Kohl in Aachen 1994

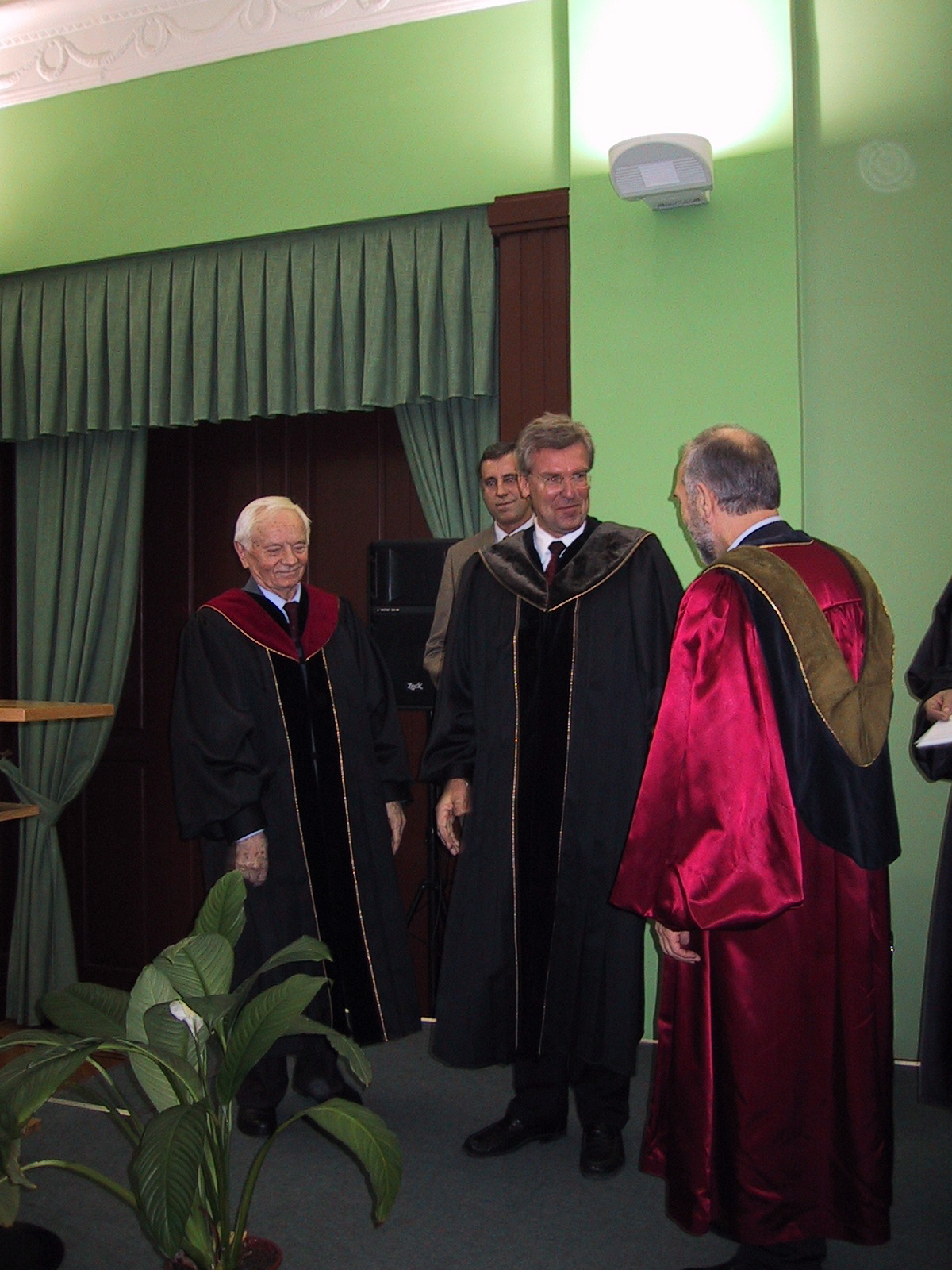
Ulrich Daldrup awarded Doctor Honoris Causa by Technical University of Kaunas

Ulrich Daldrup spent thirty years working in international cooperation (development aid) and humanitarian assistance. He spent many years of his life in Africa and Asia. His first assignment was from 1972 to 1974 within the framework of German international cooperation on behalf of the Federal Ministry for Economic Cooperation and Development, serving as an advisor at the rank of department head in the Ministry of Industry in Rabat, Morocco. Starting in 1975, he was a partner at a consulting firm in Cologne until 1979 when he founded his own consulting company, GFE GmbH, which specialized in international cooperation. He also lived in Mauritius for several years (1991 to 1993) as an advisor to the first Mauritian President, Cassam Uteem. Daldrup played a significant role in the formulation of the new constitution of Mauritius, introduced on March 12, 1992, through which Mauritius became a republic and Cassam Uteem became the first president. Daldrup lived for extended periods in Bizerte (Tunisia), Dakar (Senegal), Libreville (Gabon), Nairobi (Kenya), and Mogadishu (Somalia), where he was heavily involved in economic development and coordination of humanitarian aid, alongside conducting scientific research. He has authored numerous books and given lectures on the topic of international cooperation.

== Political career ==
In 1992, Ulrich Daldrup joined the CDU in Aachen. By September 1993, he was elected chairman of the CDU Aachen and became their top candidate in 1994. In the municipal election of September 1994, Ulrich Daldrup brought the CDU back to power in Aachen and was elected the city's first mayor. In 1999, he was again nominated as the top candidate and won the municipal election once more with 49.5%. However, in the 1999 election for Lord Mayor of Aachen, he lost with 40.07% of the vote to the incumbent Jürgen Linden, who received 52.54%. In 1999, he also became chairman of the MIT – Mittelstands- und Wirtschaftsvereinigung (Association of Small and Medium-Sized Businesses and Business Association). Ulrich Daldrup is a founding member of the Euregio Council Maas-Rhine and was one of the authors of its constitution. During his political career, he welcomed numerous heads of government and other dignitaries to Aachen, including the then German Chancellor Helmut Kohl. After his tenure as Mayor of Aachen, Ulrich Daldrup took on the role of the Federal Government Commissioner (Federal Ministry for Economic Affairs and Energy) for the Baltic States. For this position, he was delegated to Riga (Latvia) from 2000 until May 1, 2004, where he served at the rank of State Secretary in the Ministry of Finance in Riga. He was responsible for preparing Latvia, in particular, for accession to the European Union in the areas of regional development and municipal administration.

== Academic career ==
Since 1984, Ulrich Daldrup has been a professor of "International Law" and "Business Administration" at the TH Köln University. In 2004, FH Aachen University appointed him to teach "International Management." From 1996 to 1998, he served as the rector of the University of Bradford/NIMBAS, MBA Campus Aachen, as part of an international MBA program. He has also lectured at Kaunas University of Technology (Lithuania) and established a technology center there, for which he was awarded an honorary doctorate (Doctor Honoris Causa) in 2000. Furthermore, Ulrich Daldrup has delivered lectures at the University of Szczecin (Poland) and Georgetown University (USA). His research focuses on regional policy, European contracting, international cooperation, and in his later years, the social consequences of the energy transition and its impact on selected countries in Asia and Africa. In 2016, Ulrich Daldrup additionally took on the subject of Entrepreneurship at TH Köln. Since 2010, Ulrich Daldrup has been the Chairman of the Advisory Board of the ITT/TH Köln University.

He has published a number of books on international cooperation.

== Other Offices ==
In 2004, Ulrich Daldrup founded the Business Club Aachen Maastricht, through which he successfully brought together German, Belgian, and Dutch entrepreneurs. In 2006, he was appointed Vice-President of the humanitarian Water for the World Foundation. In 2007, he founded the energy cluster "Energy Hills" in collaboration with ten European universities, three major research institutions, and numerous private companies in the energy sector. In 2015, Ulrich Daldrup became Chairman of the Supervisory Board of the European Agency for Sustainable Energy (EASE), and in 2018, he was elected Deputy Chairman of the Board of Trustees of the European Foundation Aachener Dom. Ulrich Daldrup has been appointed to numerous supervisory boards, including IBC AG (Chairman of the Supervisory Board), FH Aachen, University, the startup initiative AC.E Aachener Entrepreneurship Team e.V., and Energieloft GmbH.

== Entrepreneur Award of the Business Club Aachen Maastricht ==
In 2007, Ulrich Daldrup initiated the Entrepreneur Award of the Business Club Aachen Maastricht. This award adheres to very high standards for its recipients. The Entrepreneur Award can only be given to individuals who have been or are very successful as entrepreneurs and who, in addition to their entrepreneurship, have made sustainable contributions to the common good, such as supporting social, sports, cultural, humanitarian, or other noble causes, as well as the promotion of sciences. This honor comes with a cash prize of 5,000 euros. An independent board of trustees takes on the task of proposing an entrepreneur each year who meets the set criteria.

== Distinctions ==
- “Doctor Honoris Causa” by the Technical University of Kaunas
- "Order of Merit of the Federal Republic of Germany"
- “Honorarprofessor” of the University of Applied Sciences of Cologne
- “Ehrentaler” of the Handwerkskammer Rhein-Main

== Publications ==
- Ernährungssicherung und Nahrungsmittelhilfe – ein Instrument der Entwicklungshilfe, Verlag Breitenbach Publishers, Saarbrücken/Fort Lauderdale 1981, ISBN 3-88156-187-0
- Investitionsführer Sri Lanka, Verlag Breitenbach Publishers, Saarbrücken/Fort Lauderdale 1985, ISBN 3-88156-307-5
- Sri Lanka – Guide de l'investisseur, Verlag GFE Aachen 1984, ISBN 3-923905-02-5
- Sri Lanka – Investors Guide, Verlag Breitenbach Publishers, Saarbrücken/Fort Lauderdale 1985, ISBN 3-88156-308-3
- Wirtschaftsführer Nigeria, Verlag Breitenbach Publishers, Saarbrücken/Fort Lauderdale 1985, ISBN 3-88156-306-7
- Wirtschaftsführer Wirtschaftsgemeinschaft westafrikanischer Staaten (CEDEAO/ECOWAS), Verlag GFE Aachen 1978
- Afrika – ein verlorener Kontinent. Eine kritisch-analytische Betrachtung und der Versuch eines Ausblicks, in: Technologie, Resource Management &
- Development, Volume 6, Cuvillier Verlag, Göttingen 2009, ISBN 978-3-86955-024-4
- Democratic Republic of Congo: Growth with Governance in the Mining Sector- World Bank May 2008, Report No. 43402,
- 75 Jahre soziale Marktwirtschaft, Festvortrag beim BKU – Bund Katholischer Unternehmer in Berlin am 3. Mai 2024
