= Juan Becerra Acosta =

Mexican journalist

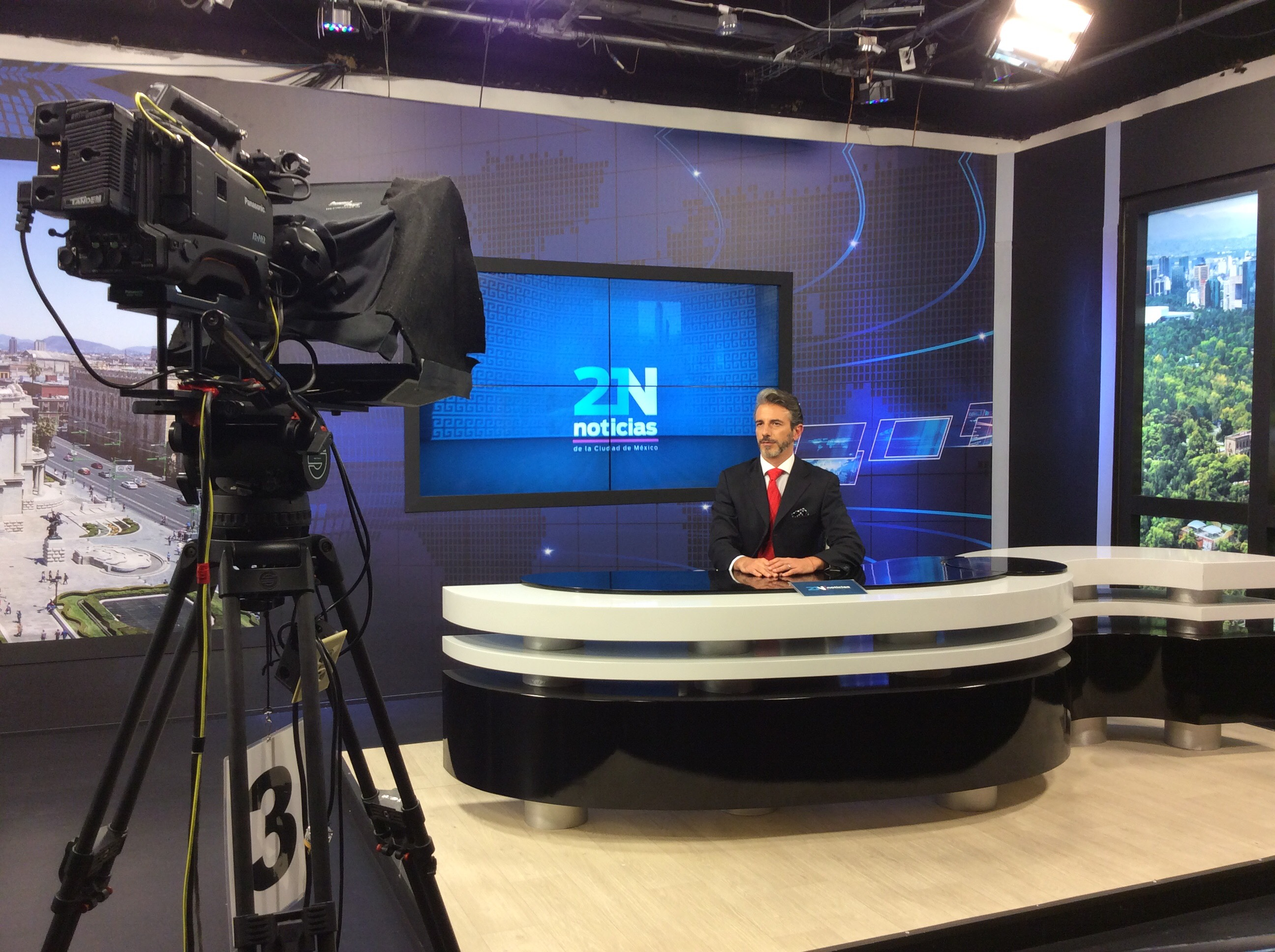
- Born: August 20, 1973 (age 51); México City, Mexico
- Occupation: Journalist

Juan Alberto Becerra Acosta Aguilar de Quevedo (born August 20, 1973 in Mexico City) is a Mexican journalist. He has a bachelor's degree in psychology from the Universidad Latinoamericana (ULA).

Becerra Acosta is a news anchor for Mexico news show, "Fórmula Noticias con Juan Becerra Acosta" hosted by Radio Fórmula. He has previously hosted, amongst other teleivison shows, Informe Capital at Capital 21 Public Tv Chanel of México city. "Tu Ciudad Es", "#AsambleaConstituyente", "ConstituyenteCDMX", "MiradasCDMX", and "S.O.S., Adolescente En Casa".

He is an active member of the editorial board of Algarabía Magazine, a former chief editor of Tiempo Libre Magazine, and a columnist at Contratiempo Chicagón Magazine.

In 2011 he hosted a radio programme, "Dios Creó a la Mujer" (English: "God Created Women") with Lucy Orozco on Mexican public radio station IMER. Thereafter, in 2012 he created a radio series about theatre and drama called "Revelaciones Dramáticas" (English: "Dramatic Reveleations"). In 2013 he ended his radio career with an 80 episode broadcast entitled "La Escena en su Papel" (English: "The Scene on your Paper").

In 2009, the Ball House Museum in Mexico City hosted a photojournalism exhibition of 26 images of Mexican theatre captured by Becerra Acosta between 2005 and 2009, entitled "52 Weeks of Theatre". In November 2016, the exhibition was rehosted by the Museum of Mexico City.

== Awards ==
In 2014 Becerra Acostta was recognised with the "Pillar of Mexican Theatre" award by the Mexican Theatre Centre and the executive committee of the International Theatre Institute (ITI UNESCO).
