= European Schools =

Intergovernmental education organisation

- Schola Europaea
- Formation: April 12, 1957; 69 years ago
- Founders: Inner Six states: Belgium; France; Italy; Luxembourg; Netherlands; West Germany
- Founded at: Luxembourg City, Luxembourg
- Type: Intergovernmental organisation
- Purpose: Education
- Headquarters: Office of the Secretary-General of the European Schools rue de la Science 23, B-1040; Brussels, Belgium
- Coordinates: 50.842630°N 4.371680°E
- Region served: European Union
- Members: 29 contracting parties: Austria; Belgium; Bulgaria; Croatia; Cyprus; Czechia; Denmark; Estonia; Finland; France; Germany; Greece; Hungary; Ireland; Italy; Latvia; Lithuania; Luxembourg; Malta; Netherlands; Poland; Portugal; Romania; Slovakia; Slovenia; Spain; Sweden; European Union; European Atomic Energy Community
- Secretary General: Andreas Beckmann
- Main organ: Board of Governors
- Website: www.eursc.eu
- Formerly called: European School

The European Schools (Latin: Schola Europaea) is an intergovernmental organisation, which has established, financed, and administered a small group of multilingual international schools, bearing the title "European School", which exist primarily to offer an education to the children of European Union (EU) staff from the maternel to the higher years of education; offers accreditation to other schools, bearing the title "Accredited European School", under national jurisdiction within EU member states to provide its curriculum; and oversees the provision of the secondary school leaving diploma, the European Baccalaureate.

The organisation was first established as the "European School" in 1957 by the Inner Six states, which transformed into an intergovernmental venture what was formerly a private initiative, started in 1953, by staff of the institutions of the European Coal and Steel Community (ECSC) to provide schooling for their children. It was spurred on by one of the architects of post-war European integration and reconciliation, Jean Monnet. In the following decades, the organisation set up other schools mainly near the locations of other European Communities (EC) — later, European Union — institutions and bodies. To reflect this, in 2002, the organisation was officially renamed the "European Schools" following the entry into force of its current legal basis, which as of 2013 — following the accession of Croatia — includes all 27 EU member states, the European Union, and the European Atomic Energy Community (Euratom) as contracting parties.

Since 2005, the European Schools has offered accreditation to other schools under national jurisdiction to offer its curriculum and the European Baccalaureate.

The organisation's executive is the Board of Governors, composed of the ministers of education of the member state contracting parties, a representative of the European Commission on behalf of the EU and Euratom, a representative of the Staff Committee, a representative of the federated Parents' Associations and a representative of the federated Pupils' Committees.

As of September 2017, the organisation is directly responsible for thirteen schools located in six EU member states, and as of September 2021, has accredited twenty schools located in thirteen EU countries, with a further five schools engaged in the accreditation process.

== History ==
=== Foundation: An intergovernmental enterprise ===
Following the establishment of the institutions of the European Coal and Steel Community (ECSC) in Luxembourg, in 1952, it became apparent that it was necessary to provide an education to the children of the officials of those institutions in their mother tongues. The lack of such provisions posed challenges in building an administration that reflected the diverse makeup of the ECSC's six founding member states, discouraging potential employees who heralded from outside the jurisdiction in which the institutions were based from relocating with their families. In 1953, employees of the ECSC established an association, financed by the High Authority of the ECSC, for the purpose of founding a school in Luxembourg providing nursery and primary education to the children of the institutions' officials. The school begun to operate on 4 October 1953, with teachers recruited and paid by the association.

However, by the spring of 1954, it was apparent that the solution was inadequate, with the school unable to provide a secondary education to its enrolees. The President of the High Authority of the ECSC, Jean Monnet, invited representatives of the education ministers of the six founding member states of the ECSC to Luxembourg for discussions on a school with intergovernmental status. The member state representatives transformed themselves into a Board of Governors, who would oversee the establishment of such a school. It was agreed that teaching staff would be seconded from the member states, who would continue to pay their salary, and that salaries would be harmonised by means of an additional supplement. On 12 October 1954, the first two years of the secondary school began to operate.

On 12 April 1957, the governments of the six ECSC member states signed the Statute of the European School, which took the form of an international treaty. Following ratification, the agreement entered into force on 22 February 1960. Under Article 6 of the Statute, the European School was to have the status of a public institution in the law of each of the contracting parties and was to have legal personality to the extent requisite for the attainment of its objectives. The organs of the school were to be a Board of Governors, which would have executive authority over the School, a Boards of Inspectors, an Administrative Board and a Head teacher. Article 8 provided that the Board of Governors of the European School was to consist of the "Minister or Ministers of each contracting party whose responsibilities include national education and/or external cultural relations", with the Board able to confer a position to a representative of the High Authority of the European Coal and Steel Community, as per Article 27.

=== The spread of the European Schools ===
Following the foundation of the European Economic Community (EEC) and the European Atomic Energy Community (Euratom) in 1957 and the establishment of the school in Luxembourg, other European Schools were set up in Brussels and then in Mol, Belgium in 1958, in Varese, Italy in 1960, Karlsruhe, Germany in 1962, in Bergen, the Netherlands in 1963, and a second school in Brussels in 1974. In order to facilitate the setting-up of those new schools and to provide them with a legal basis, the governments of the member states signed on 13 April 1962 in Luxembourg a Protocol on the setting-up of European Schools with reference to the 1957 Statute of the European School.

In 1967, the institutions of the EEC, ECSC and Euratom were merged to form the European Communities. Consequently, the three organisations were represented on the Board of Governors by the European Commission of the European Communities, the successor institution to the High Authority of the ECSC. Taking advantage of the powers conferred to it by the 1957 Statute, the Board of Governors signed an agreement with the European Patent Organisation - a separate intergovernmental organisation - in December 1975 allowing for the creation, in 1977, of a European School in Munich, Germany for the education and instruction together of children of its staff. In 1973, the first enlargement of the European Communities saw the United Kingdom, Denmark and Ireland join, who all likewise acceded to the 1957 Statute. In 1978, a European School was established at Culham, UK in order to serve the children of the staff posted to the Joint European Torus Joint Undertaking (JET), supervised by Euratom, for the development of a common nuclear fusion programme. By 1986, following the enlargement of the European Communities to include Greece, Spain and Portugal and their ratification of the Statute, the Schools were obliged to provide an education to the students of officials originating from the 12 EC member states. Finland acceded to the Statute in 1995 after its accession to the European Union.

=== Coping with EU enlargement ===
Pursuant to the incorporation of the European Communities into the European Union in 1993, and envisioning the enlargement in membership of the EU following the end of the Cold War, it was decided that the legal and organisational framework of the Schools needed an overhaul. On 21 June 1994 the Convention Defining the Statute of the European Schools, which repealed and replaced the 1957 Statute of the European School and its accompanying 1962 Protocol, was signed by all 12 then EU member states. On 1 October 2002 it came into effect, following ratification by all signatories. Following the subsequent enlargements of the EU, the acceding states have also acceded to the 1994 Convention, which, as of September 2021, includes amongst its contracting parties all 27 EU member states, as well as the EU itself, and Euratom.

=== Brexit ===
As part of the UK's withdrawal from the EU, better known as Brexit, the UK government notified its intention to withdraw from the Convention Defining the Statute of the European Schools. The UK's formal exit from the European Schools occurred at 00:00 CET on 31 August 2021, which represented, as per the terms established within the Withdrawal Agreement, the end of the school year that was ongoing at the end of the transition period. However, the UK has committed itself in the Withdrawal Agreement to maintain the legal rights, as laid out in Article 5(2) of the convention, of any former pupils, as well as those who are enrolled in a cycle of secondary studies in a European School before 31 August 2021 and acquire a European Baccalaureate after that date.

Brexit posed substantial challenges for the Europa School UK — an Oxfordshire based Accredited European School formed by stakeholders of the former European School, Culham, as accredited status may only be awarded to schools within an EU member state. As a result, the Europa School's accredited status expired on 31 August 2021, with the school no longer able to offer the European Baccalaureate.

== Principles and objectives ==
The historical significance of the first European School, founded a mere 8 years after the end of World War II, was not lost on its architects. Children, whose parents had fought on opposite sides of the conflict, would not only be taught together, but, as per the curriculum of the School, learn history and geography in a foreign language and from a foreign point of view. "May the Europe of the European schools definitively take the place of the Europe of the war cemeteries," René Mayer, head of the ECSC proclaimed upon the opening of a new custom building for the School on Boulevard de la Foire in Luxembourg, on 11 December 1957. This sentiment is echoed in the words inscribed in Latin on parchment and sealed in each of the European Schools' foundation stones. Translated into English, it reads:

Educated side by side, untroubled from infancy by divisive prejudices, acquainted with all that is great and good in the different cultures, it will be borne in upon them as they mature that they belong together. Without ceasing to look to their own lands with love and pride, they will become in mind Europeans, schooled and ready to complete and consolidate the work of their fathers before them, to bring into being a united and thriving Europe.

— Marcel Decombis, member of the cabinet of Jean Monnet and Head of the European School, Luxembourg between 1953 and 1960

== Organs ==
=== Board of Governors ===
The Board of Governors is the common executive body of the European Schools, determining educational, administrative and financial matters. When it is not in session, its powers are exercised by its officially appointed Secretary-General.

==== Membership ====
The governing board is composed of the ministers of education of each of the EU member states, normally represented by senior civil servants from the ministries of education or foreign affairs, together with the representative of the European Commission, representing the EU and Euratom, and the representative of the European Patent Office. A representative designated by the Staff Committee, a representative of the parents designated by the federated Parent's Associations are also members of the Board of Governors, with limited voting rights. A representative of the federated Pupils' Committees (CoSup) is also present, as an observer without voting rights.

==== Preparatory Committees ====
Matters to be discussed by the Board of Governors first make their way through a range of preparatory committees, the most important of which are the Joint Teaching Committee and the Budgetary Committee. The Joint Teaching Committee gathers Inspectors and directors, together with representatives of teachers, parents, pupils and a representative of the European Commission and the European Patent Office. It examines proposals concerning the organisation, curricula of the schools and all other pedagogical matters. The Budgetary Committee, likewise, gathers finance officials from the EU member states, together with representatives of the European Commission and European Patent Office to examine the financial implications of educational proposals and the budgets of individual schools and of the General Secretariat in Brussels.

=== Boards of Inspectors ===
Supervision of the education provided by the European Schools is conducted by two Boards of Inspectors, one for the primary and nursery sections and one for the secondary section. One Inspector from each of the 27 EU member states sits on each Board.

=== Administrative Boards ===
Each European School has an Administrative Board responsible for the day-to-day administration and functioning of the each respective School. Chaired by the Secretary-General of the European Schools. Its other members are the director of the School, a representative of the European Commission, two elected representatives of the teachers, two representatives of the Parents' Association, a representative of the administrative and socially staff, and, at the European School of Munich, a representative of the European Patent Office. Students have two elected representatives present as observers for the majority of the meeting. Bodies which have signed an agreement with a school and have at least 20 pupils on roll also have the right to be represented on the Administrative Board.

=== Directors (Head teachers) and teachers ===
Each director is appointed by the Board of Governors for nine years. There are generally two deputy-directors teachers, one for the secondary section and one for the primary and nursery sections. They are also appointed for nine years. Directors and deputy-directors are appointed directly by the Board of Governors. While some full-time teachers are seconded by their national governments for a period of up to nine years, others are hired locally within the member states in which the schools reside. Due to recruitment issues within the member states, these teachers are increasingly used as the primary category of teachers within the schools.

=== Staff Committees ===
Each European School elects, annually, two representatives of the teaching staff (one primary, one secondary) to form a European School Staff Committee which is represented on the Board of Governors, in the Preparatory Committees and on the Administrative Board of each School. In 2016, these roles were enlarged to include Locally Recruited Teachers (LRT) and two further representatives are elected annually. These representatives do not have voting rights, however they are able to attend meetings and represent the interests of LRTs vis-a-vis the School.

=== Complaints Board ===
In the European Schools system, the Complaints Board, an independent administrative court, represents the judiciary, owing to the Schools' unique intergovernmental legal basis.

=== Parents' Associations ===
Common to each European School, the respective Parents' Associations are responsible for overseeing the provision of school transportation, the running of canteen services and extra-curricula activities. Each Parents' Association is open to any parent or legal guardian who has a child enrolled in the Schools, and possesses a place on the Administrative Board of their respective European School. Via a body which federates all the Parents' Associations of the European Schools, InterParents, they participate in meetings of the Board of Governors of the European Schools, enabling them a voice in intergovernmental meetings which set the future direction of the organisation as a whole. Each Parents' Association is also a member of the Groupe Unitaire pour la Défense des Ecoles Européennes (GUDEE), which groups Parents’Associations, Trades-Unions and other organisations possessing an interest in the future of the European Schools together.

=== Pupils' Committees and CoSup ===
Regulations agreed by the Board of Governors of the European Schools recognise the right of the students of each School to organise and represent themselves in the administration and functioning of the Schools via a Pupils' Committee. Each European Schools' Pupils' Committee is led by a democratically elected president. The composition of the Pupils Committee's (PC) and internal procedures vary from school to school, depending on the local PC statute.

The Pupils' Committees of the European Schools are federated via CoSup, an acronym formed from its French title, Conseil Supérieur des Elèves. Each Pupils' Committee elects two representatives to send to meetings of CoSup. As of 2006, CoSup is recognised by the Board of Governors of the European Schools as an official body. It is able to represent common student interests on the European Schools' Joint Teaching Committee and at the Board of Governors. CoSup possesses a common fund, able to financially support represented Pupils' Committees, when necessary. Amongst other duties, CoSup is responsible for organising the annual Euronight (formerly Europarty), held in a different European city each year, and open to any student of the European Schools over the age of 16 to attend.

CoSup meets five times per academic year and utilises a Qualified Majority Voting system, endowing each European School represented with a number of votes proportional to its share of the total number of students enrolled across all European Schools. Each School receives an equal vote weighting for matters concerning the functioning of CoSup, such as its presidential elections, which occur at the last meeting of each academic year.

== See also ==
- Accredited European School
- European Baccalaureate
- European School
