= European Baccalaureate =

Bilingual secondary school leaving certification

The European Baccalaureate (or EB) is a bilingual educational diploma, which certifies the completion of secondary studies in a European School or Accredited European School by the Board of Governors of the intergovernmental organisation, "The European Schools". The diploma is awarded for the successful achievement of coursework and concomitant examinations which require that students take a minimum of 10 courses as well as be fully proficient in two languages. Students may take up to 14 courses. It is officially recognised as an entry qualification for Higher Education in all the member states of the European Union (EU), as well as in a number of others. All participating countries are legally obligated to ensure EB diploma holders enjoy the same rights and benefits as other holders of secondary school-leaving certificates in their jurisdictions. The name ‘European Baccalaureate’ belongs solely to the European Schools, which, since their establishment, have had a monopoly over its use in all the official languages of the EU. (This diploma should not be confused with other types of educational qualifications which also bear the name Baccalaureate like the International Baccalaureate. In German, the European Baccalaureate is called the Europäisches Abitur, not to be confused with the German Abitur.)

== Overview ==
The European Baccalaureate is a bilingual diploma taken at the end of the seventh year of secondary education. Students must study a minimum of ten subjects and are examined by means of written and oral examinations and by continuous assessment. The EB may only be awarded to students who have completed their secondary school education within either one of the thirteen European Schools, established by the intergovernmental organisation, "The European Schools", or one of the fourteen schools under national jurisdiction which have received the status of an Accredited European School by the Board of Governors of the European Schools. The EB should be distinguished from the International Baccalaureate (IB) and the baccalaureates of various national systems. Details of the examination are set out in the Annex of the Statute of the European School and in the Regulations for the EB, available from the schools.

The EB is administered and directly supervised by an external examining board appointed annually by the Board of Governors. The examining board consists of up to three representatives of each member state, who must satisfy the conditions governing the appointment of equivalent examining boards in their respective countries. It is presided over by a senior university educator appointed by each member state in turn, assisted by a member of the Board of Inspectors of the schools.

Article 5 (2) of the Statute provides that holders of the Baccalaureate shall:

- enjoy, in the member state of which they are nationals, all the benefits attaching to the possession of the diploma or certificate awarded at the end of secondary school education in that country; and
- be entitled to seek admission to any university in the territory of any member state on the same terms as nationals of that member state with equivalent qualifications

The EB is a two-year course and assesses the performance of students in the subjects taught in secondary years 6–7.

The first awards of the EB were made in 1959.

The EB is marked in percentages out of 100, and, in contrast to many national systems (e.g. British A-Levels), comprises a wide range of compulsory subjects and 3–5 elective subjects. Compulsory studies include mother tongue, 1st foreign language, mathematics (5 hours/week or 3 hours/week course), philosophy, one science subject, history and geography (both taught in the 1st foreign language), and gym. These also depend on the orientation that the pupil has chosen at the end of year 5. The choice of elective subjects is large (see examples in the table below), although a given subject may not be available if the class size is too small and sometimes other subjects are available.

European Baccalaureate curriculum, including number of weekly periods (p) allocated to each subject (availability of options and complementary subjects varies from year to year and from school to school)
Compulsory	Optional	Complementary
Language 1 (4p)	Ancient Greek (4p)	Biology Lab (2p)
Language 2 (4p)	Latin (4p)	Chemistry Lab (2p)
Mathematics (3p or 5p)	Biology (4p)	Physics Lab (2p)
Sport	Chemistry (4p)	ICT (2p)
Religion or Ethics (2p)	Physics (4p)	Sociology (2p)
History (2p)	History (4p)	
Geography (2p)	Geography (4p)	
Science (2p)	Economics (4p)	
Philosophy (2p)	Philosophy (4p)	
	Art (4p)	Art (2p)
	Music (4p)	Music (2p)
	Language 3 (4p)	Language 5 (2p)
	Language 4 (4p)	
	Advanced Language 1 (3p)	
	Advanced Language 2 (3p)	
	Advanced Mathematics (3p)	

A minimum of 31 periods a week must be taken, with a maximum of 35 periods, although this is sometimes extended to 36 or even 37 periods. At least 2 Column 3 subjects must be chosen; a maximum of 4 can be taken. There is a core of compulsory subjects which include language 1 (mother tongue), language 2 (first foreign language), mathematics, history, geography, philosophy, religion/ethics and sport. In addition, if no science subject is taken as an elective subject, a science subject must be taken as a compulsory subject. Students must take a minimum of ten courses. They have the choice of two elective subjects of four lessons per week and may take as many as four additional subjects in addition to the ten compulsory subjects. These subjects may include each of the separate sciences, social sciences, Latin, art, music, philosophy and languages 3 and 4. Mathematics can be taken as a 3-lesson or 5-lesson per week course. Additional advanced courses of three lessons per week may be taken in mathematics, language 1 and language 2. Students may also choose complementary courses of two lessons per week such as practical science, introductory economics, art, music and theatre.

The total mark consists of:

- 20% coursework from 7th year
- 30% written exams in January
- 15% oral exams in June (where applicable)
- 35% written exams in June

Consequently, there is a heavy workload for the students; the system enforces not only a rounded knowledge of all subjects but also allows students to specialize in individual fields. Students are obliged to have a strong skills in one foreign language (in years 2-5 of secondary school a 2nd foreign language is also compulsory). The final pass-rate is very high (almost always over 98%), in part due to the practice of 'weeding out' candidates who are not academically strong enough to complete the Baccalaureate.

This process starts from an early age whereby many pupils either leave, are asked to leave or fall foul of the 'three strikes' rule (fail a year 3 times and the student will be asked to leave). Failing the same year twice also means leaving the school. Failing and repeating a year is a fairly common occurrence from age 10 upwards; roughly up to 5% of pupils will fail in each year. The 5th year is comparable to the German 'Mittlere Reife' or British GCSEs.

However, the pluridisciplinarity the EB offers is advantageous to students wishing to go on to university studies, in France and Germany especially. Recent experience (2011–2012 and beyond) has shown that students applying to British universities are encountering growing difficulties, sometimes serious, in having their Baccalaureate qualifications adequately recognised.

== Difficulty ==
This reflects the demanding nature of the examination process and the fact that students need to perform very well across a very broad range of subjects and be fully bilingual. The bilingual demands of the course work and concomitant examinations entail that monolingual students cannot pass.

== Compulsory bilingual education ==
The ten compulsory courses include a mother tongue and a second language. Students are also obliged to take a third language in years 1 to 5 upon entry into secondary level education. Students must be highly skilled in two languages. They must take literature classes in both their first language and their second. Although some obligatory classes such as philosophy, biology and mathematics are taught in the students' mother tongue, other compulsory courses such as history and geography are taught in the second language ensuring students are fully bilingual. This insistence on bilingual course work and examination makes it difficult for non-bilingual new entrants to succeed.

== Evaluation ==
In a 2006 study based on a sample of over 500 former European School pupils, Kelly and Kelly compared the performances at British and Irish universities of students who had participated in the EB with the performances of students who had undertaken the dominant UK equivalent qualification, A-levels.

This showed that in terms of the probability of getting a good degree, an EB score of:

- 80 or more was roughly equivalent to 380 Universities and Colleges Admissions Service (UCAS) points awarded for A-levels (3 A grades).
- 70 to 79 was equivalent to a UCAS score of 340-360 (ABB to AAB)
- 60 to 69 was equivalent to 300-320 UCAS points (BBC, BBB).

The study concluded that EB participants were disadvantaged by the then current official equivalency system for converting their mark into UCAS points, with even students with a bare pass at the EB (60-64) more likely to get a good degree at university than students who achieved 280-300 UCAS points (BBC, BCC, CCC). Kelly and Kelly remarked that students undertaking the EB received unrealistic offers when applying to UK universities, with admissions offices failing to understand how seldom an EB score of 90+% is awarded. They found that the UK National Recognition Information Centre had incorrectly assumed that a fail mark in the EB (below 60%) was equivalent to a fail mark within the A-level qualification, (2 E grades or below 40%). Similarly, Kelly and Kelly concluded that the Irish Central Applications Office had also compiled an incorrect table of equivalencies for the EB with the Irish Leaving Certificate.

In 2020, the UK government issued updated guidance to admissions officers to facilitate the comparison to A-levels.

European Baccalaureate and A level overall / combined grade comparisons
A level grades	Comparable overall EB grades
A*A*A*	91.78-100.00
A*A*A	89.68-91.77
A*AA	87.55-89.67
AAA	85.15-87.54
AAB	83.21-85.14
ABB	81.08-83.20

European Baccalaureate and A level single subject grade comparisons
A level grades	Comparable EB grades from 2021
A*	9.50-10.00
A	8.75-9.49
B	7.84-8.74
C	6.76-7.83
D	5.74-6.75
E	5.00-5.73

== See also ==
- Accredited European School
- European School, the school type
- European Schools, the school authority
