= European School, Culham =

- Schola Europaea
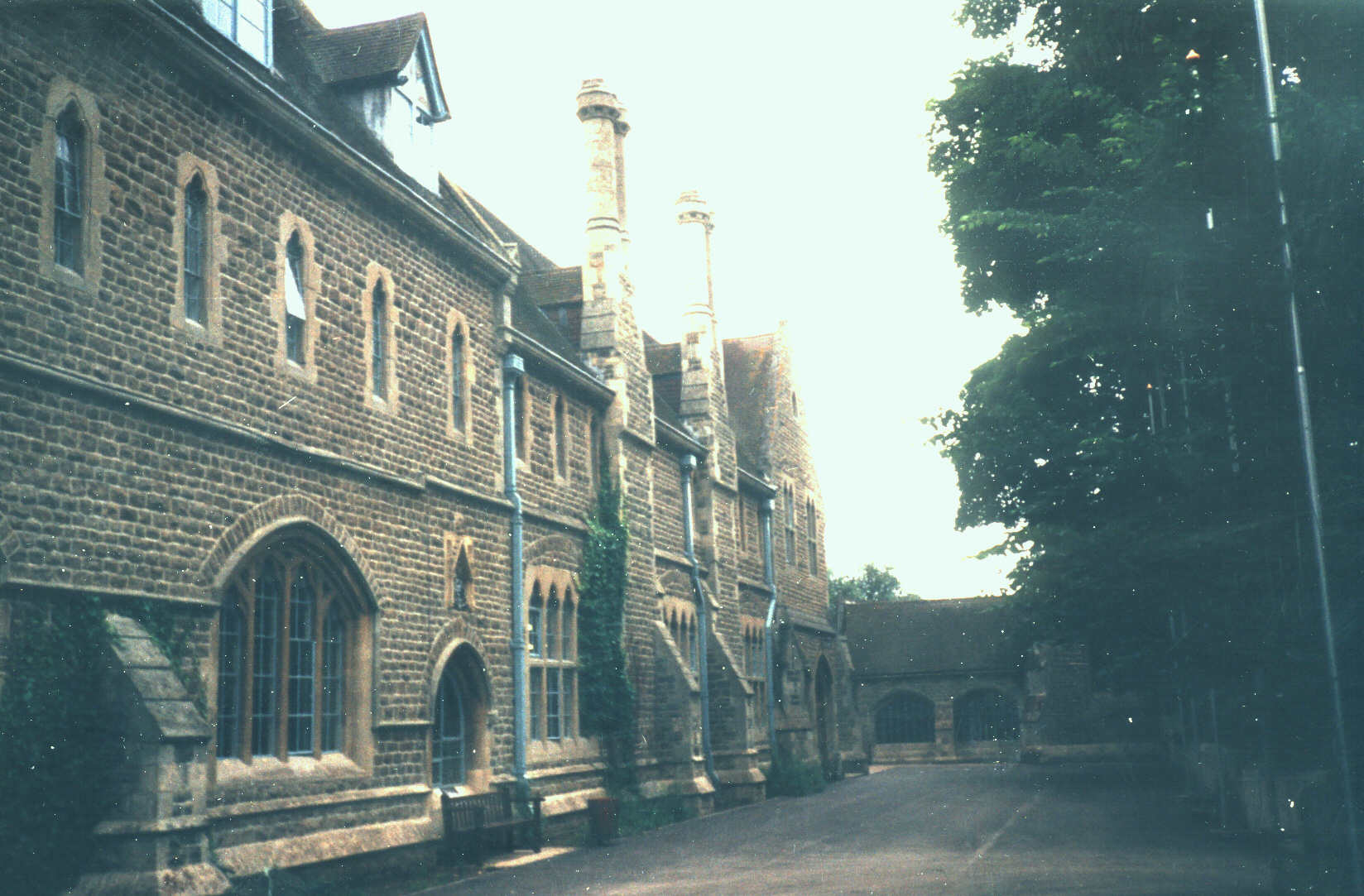
- The 19th-century school building in 1988

Location
- Thame Lane; Culham, Oxfordshire, OX14 3DZ; England; 51°39′22″N 1°15′28″W

Information
- Type: European School
- Established: 1978
- Closed: 31 August 2017
- Operated by: The European Schools
- Director: Leene Soekov (Estonian)
- Gender: Mixed
- Age: 4 to 18
- Enrolment: 390 (Note: At time of closure.) (2016-2017)
  - Peak enrolment: 835 (2008-2009)
- Alumni: Old Culhamites
- Sister Schools: 13 European Schools
- Diploma: European Baccalaureate

The European School, Culham (ESC) was one of the fourteen European Schools and the only one in the United Kingdom. Located in Culham near Abingdon in Oxfordshire. It was founded in 1978 for the purpose of providing an education to the children of staff working for the European Atomic Energy Community (Euratom).

== History ==
The school was founded in 1978 for the purpose of providing an education to the children of staff working for the European Atomic Energy Community (Euratom) on the Joint European Torus (JET) fusion energy research programme based nearby, and later, additionally, children of staff seconded as part of the European Fusion Development Agreement (EFDA). The school was based in the Grade II listed former building of Culham College, a nineteenth-century Diocesan Training College for the Church of England.

With the relocation of European Union-seconded researchers and their families following the formation of JET's successor in France, the International Thermonuclear Experimental Reactor (ITER), and the formation of EFDA's successor, EUROfusion, to support ITER's development, it was announced that the school would close on 31 August 2017. The school confirmed that this was a move unrelated to Brexit. The final two employees, the bursar and accountant, continued to work until 31 May 2018.

The former ESC campus was subsumed by the Europa School UK on 1 September 2017. ESUK is a 'free school' and an Accredited European School with all students following a learning programme leading to the European Baccalaureate qualification. Accredited European Schools are schools under national jurisdiction within European Union (EU) member states which, without forming part of the intergovernmental network of European Schools, offer its multilingual curriculum and the European Baccalaureate.

== Notable alumni ==
- Henry Brett, England polo player
- Tommaso Allan, Italian rugby union player
- Pablo Martinez (Welsh footballer), professional football player

== Notable former staff ==
- Tom Høyem, school Director (1987-1994)
- Marcus Stock, former teacher of Religious Education.
- Colin Hannaford, former mathematics teacher.

== See also ==
- Europa School UK
- European School
- European Schools
