= Ülemiste City =

Business park in Tallinn, Estonia

Coordinates: 59°25′17.28″N 24°48′6.51″E

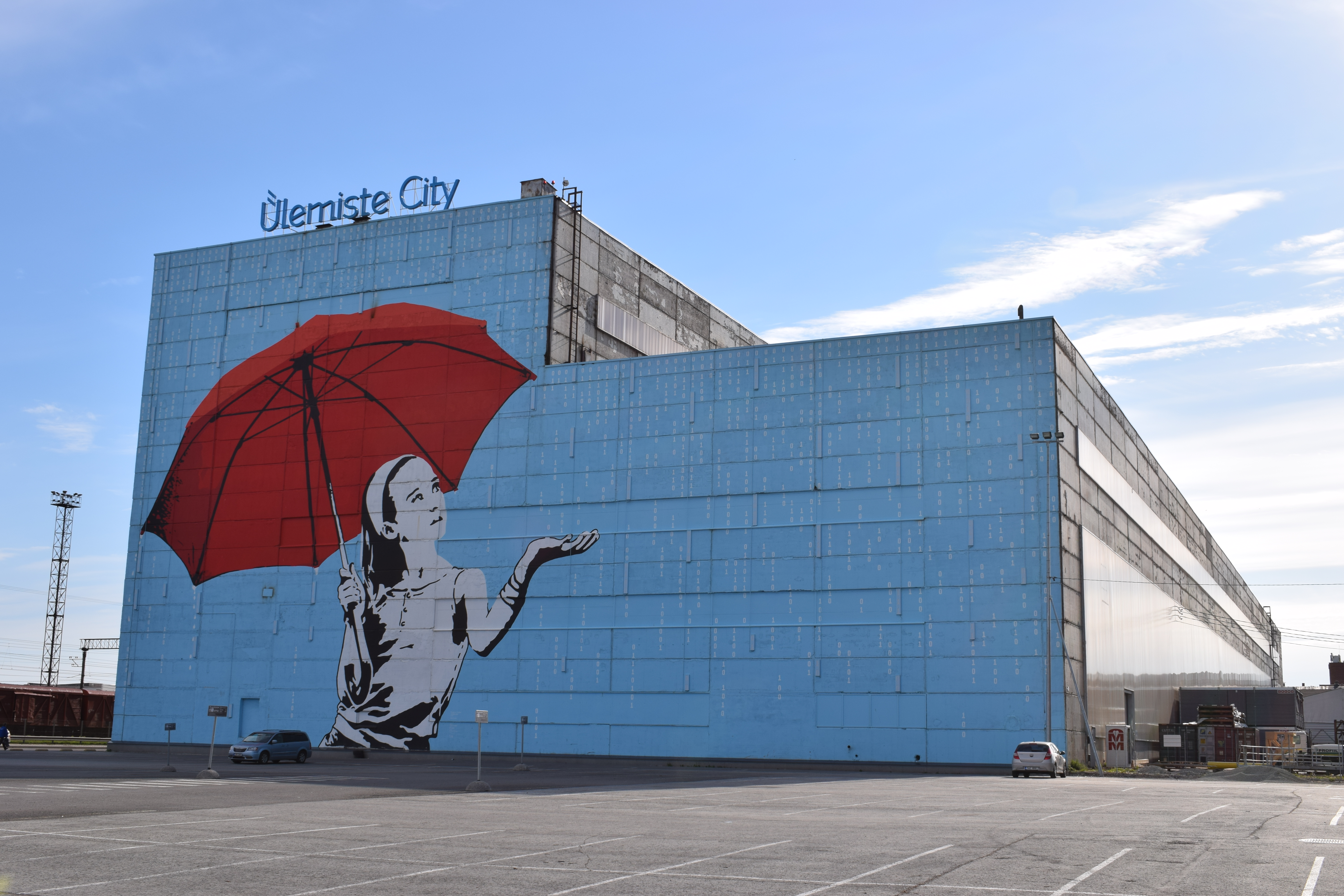
Ülemiste City

Ülemiste City is a business park in Tallinn, Estonia, on the territory of the former factory complex Dvigatel in Ülemiste neighbourhood. It is situated between Lennart Meri Tallinn Airport, shopping centre Ülemiste Keskus and the Ülemiste railway station, forming the core of the Ülemiste subdistrict.

== History ==
The factory complex Dvigatel, built in the end of the 19th century for producing railway cars and other machinery for the Russian Empire, lost its raison d’être after Estonia regained its independence from the Soviet Union in 1991. After its privatization and some unsuccessful attempts to restore former production capacities, the new owners decided to reprofile the business. In 2005, AS Mainor launched the transformation of the favourably-located 36 ha old industrial area into a modern technology campus, drawing inspiration from Kista near Stockholm, called the Silicon Valley of the Nordic countries. In 2010, the Finnish company Technopolis was included in the development of the business park.

== Current campus ==
The mission of Ülemiste City is to create a knowledge-based environment with an international reach for working, living and development that would increase the competitiveness of people and businesses, attract talented people and inspire the creation of new business models.

As of 2014, there are 300 businesses with 6,000 employees working on 82,000 m^{2} of office spaces. A range of services for businesses and employees are available. The Estonian Entrepreneurship University of Applied Sciences, Tallinn European School and Kalli-Kalli kindergarten are located in Ülemiste City. The campus also houses the E-Estonia showroom and Estonia’s biggest restaurant Dvigatel.

Lennart Meri Tallinn Airport, Ülemiste Keskus – the biggest shopping centre in Estonia –, the largest interchange in Estonia, Ülemiste railway station and Hotel Ülemiste are all situated in the immediate vicinity.

Ülemiste City is developed by two separate companies. A third of the territory is being developed by Technopolis Ülemiste AS, 51% of which is owned by the Finnish company Technopolis Plc. Two thirds of the campus is being developed by Mainor Ülemiste AS, the majority shareholder being AS Mainor.

== Future perspectives ==
The vision of Ülemiste City is to grow into a multifunctional campus operating 24/7, incorporating 15,000 employees of different businesses and organisations as well as 5,000 inhabitants.

In the near future, many important infrastructure projects (Rail Baltica passenger terminal, extension of a tramline through Ülemiste City to the airport) and other real-estate developments are planned in the Ülemiste area.

Tram services
Preceding station	Trams in Tallinn	Following station
Lennujaam Terminus	2 opening 2025	Ülemiste jaam towards Kopli
