= Ülemiste Centre =

Shopping center in Tallinn, Estonia

Coordinates: 59°25′17.97″N 24°47′39.78″E

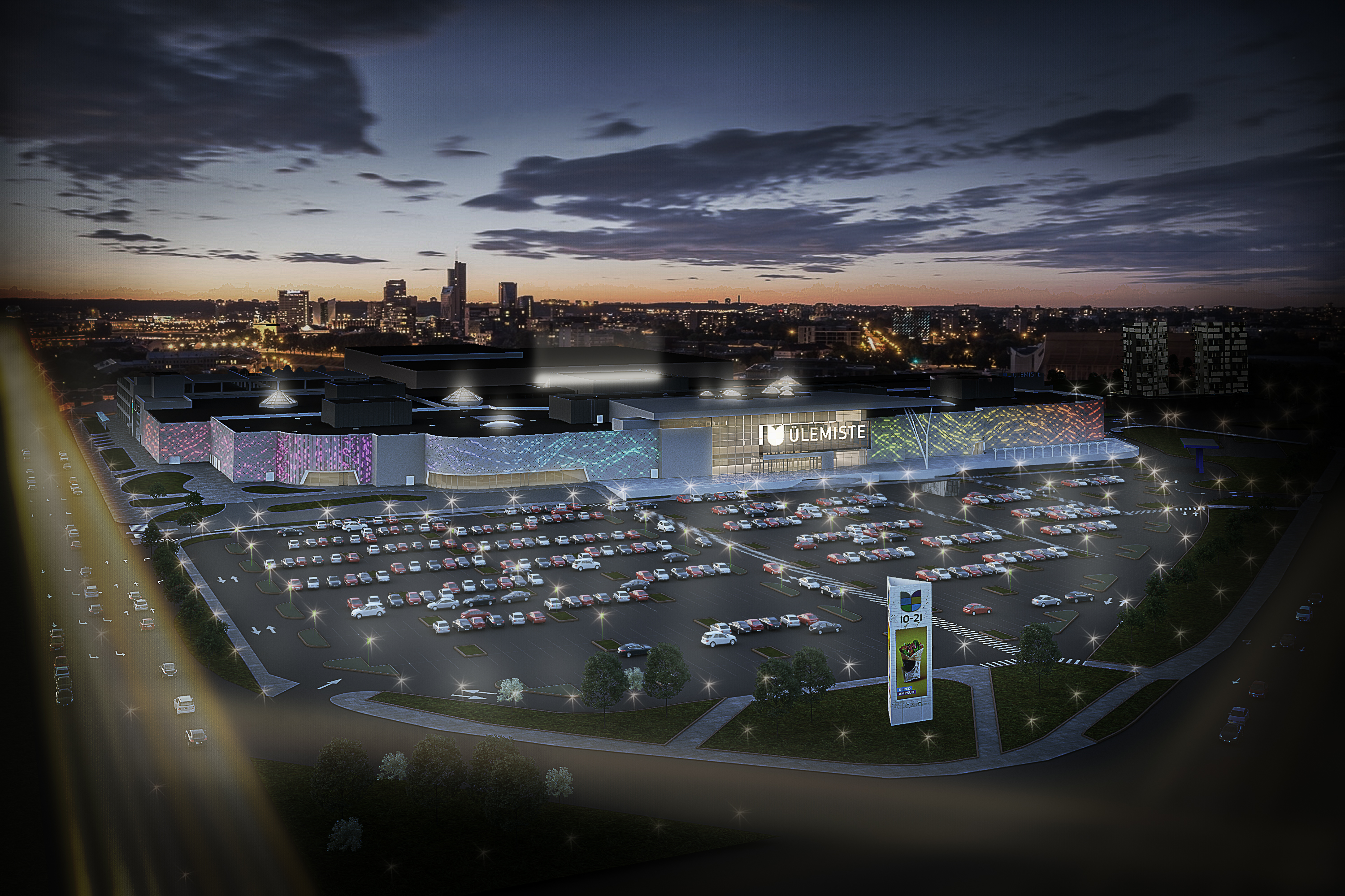
View of Ülemiste Centre in 2017

Ülemiste Keskus (Estonian: Ülemiste keskus) is a shopping centre in Tallinn, Estonia. It's adjacent to Tallinn Airport in Ülemiste. It has over 220 stores, 8 restaurants, and a large playroom for children.

Opened in 2004, the property is managed by Ülemiste Center OÜ, which earned €12 million in rental income in 2015 and whose net profit in the same year was 11.5 million euros. The owner of the company is Ülemiste Holding Nederland B.V., which in turn belongs to Linstow AS registered in Norway.

Estonia's first KFC fast food restaurant opened at Ülemiste Centre on 24 October 2019.

== See also ==
- Ülemiste City
- Lake Ülemiste
- Ülemiste Tunnel
