= Het Rijnlands Lyceum Oegstgeest =

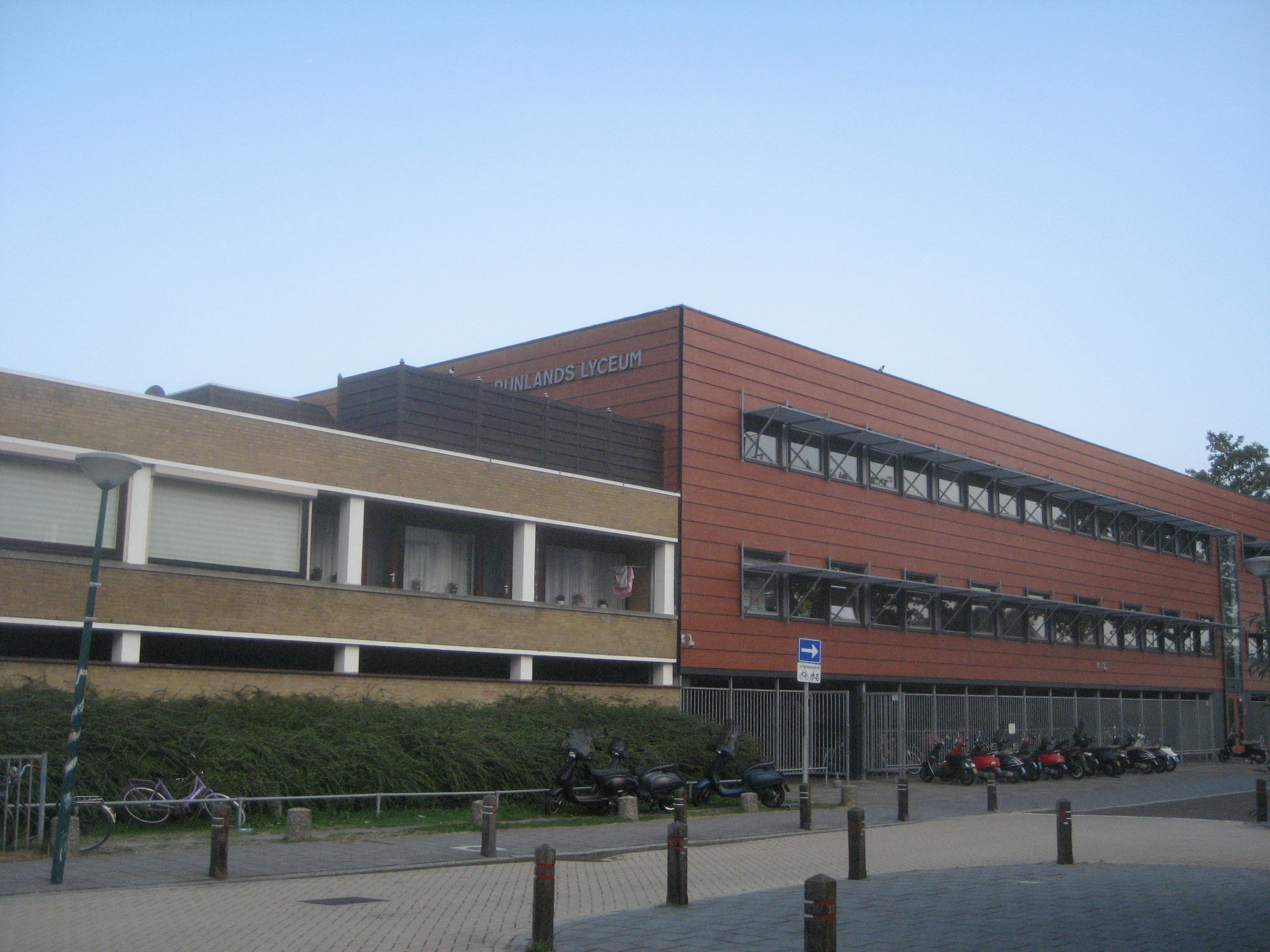
- Het Rijnlands Lyceum Oegstgeest in 2016

Location
- Apollolaan 1 Oegstgeest, South Holland, 2341 BA; Netherlands
- Coordinates: 52.1810°N 4.4619°E

Information
- School type: Independent school
- Established: 1956; 70 years ago
- School board: Rijnlands Lyceum Foundation
- Principal: G.W.M. van Langen
- Gender: Mixed
- Age range: 11 to 18
- Newspaper: De Roskam
- Website: www.rlo.nl

Het Rijnlands Lyceum Oegstgeest (informally RLO) is a secondary school in the town of Oegstgeest in South Holland, founded in 1956.

Het Rijnlands Lyceum Oegstgeest is part of the Rijnlands Lyceum Foundation, which also contains other schools in the region, including the International School of The Hague and the European School of the Hague, and formerly the Rijnlands Lyceum Dubai. The school building was designed by Rudi Bleeker, and the newly built wing from 2004 was designed by Dirk Jan Postel.

RLO alumni include many significant Dutch political or public figures (Including Cabinet minister Jet Bussemaker and current Deputy Prime Minister of the Netherlands Kajsa Ollongren).

== Curricula ==
The Rijnlands Lyceum Oegstgeest offers two streams of Dutch secondary education: "higher general continued education" (HAVO), and "preparatory scientific education" (VWO). The school also offers bilingual education (TTO), in English and Dutch. In addition, the Rijnlands Lyceum Oegstgeest has an international department offering the International Baccalaureate Middle Years Programme (IB MYP) and International Baccalaureate Diploma Programme (IB DP).

== Notable former students ==
- Rudy Andeweg (Dutch political scientist)
- Jet Bussemaker (Dutch politician: Secretary of State for Health, Welfare, and Sport; Minister of Education, Culture, and Science)
- Maarten Fontein (CEO and managing director of AFC Ajax)
- Harold Goddijn (CEO of TomTom)
- Liesbeth Koenen (linguist, journalist, and author)
- Sanne Langelaar (Dutch actress)
- Kajsa Ollongren (Dutch politician: Mayor of Amsterdam; Minister of the Interior and Kingdom Relations; Deputy Prime Minister)
- Princess Anita of Orange-Nassau (member of the Dutch royal family)
- Gerard Spong (Dutch lawyer)
- Diederik Stapel (Dutch social psychologist: known for his scientific misconduct)
- Philip Walkate (Dutch comedian and screenwriter)
- Erik-Jan Zürcher (Dutch Turkologist)

== Notable faculty ==
- Ko Colijn (Dutch journalist and political scientist – taught economics in the 1970s)
- Wicky Eekhof-de Vries (member of the Dutch Council of State – taught social studies between 1996 and 1980)
- Simone Haak (Dutch visual artist – taught arts in the 1990s and 2000s)
- Gerwin van der Werf – (Dutch author and songwriter – currently teaches music)

== See also ==
- Rijnlands Lyceum Foundation
