= Henry Brett =

Henry Brett may refer to:

- Henry Brett (MP for Gloucester) (c. 1587–1674), English Royalist politician
- Henry Brett (colonel) (died 1724), English army officer and Tory politician
- Henry Brett (journalist) (1843–1927), New Zealand journalist, newspaper proprietor, publisher, writer, politician
- Henry Brett (polo player) (born 1974), English polo player
- Henry Brett (priest) (1868–1932), Dean of Belfast
