= Ludger Limited =

Biotechnology company

Ludger Ltd is a biotechnology company with R&D and manufacturing facilities at the Culham Science Centre, Oxford, UK. The company specialises in technology for the measurement and control of biopharmaceutical glycosylation.

== History ==
The company was founded in 1999 by its chief executive, Dr Daryl Ludger Fernandes. Dr Fernandes had developed glycoprofiling technology for his doctorate in the Glycobiology Institute at the University of Oxford and in the late 1980s was responsible for transfer of that technology to Oxford GlycoSciences (OGS).

In 2000, the company won a UK Department of Trade and Industry (DTI) Smart award to develop biopharmaceutical glycoanalysis technology.; in 2001, it won a UK DTI Link grant for a collaborative R&D project to develop rapid glycoanalysis technology with GlaxoSmithKline and the University of Oxford.

The company's focus is to provide products, services for characterisation and quality control of biopharmaceutical glycosylation. Current products include kits and reagents for detailed analysis of N-linked and O-linked glycans by HPLC and mass spectrometry.

Current services include contract glycosylation analysis to support biopharmaceutical development and regulatory submissions to the US Food and Drug Administration and European Medicines Agency, glycoprofiling method development, and training in biopharmaceutical glycoprofiling procedures. The key glycoprofiling modules include monosaccharide analysis, sialic acid analysis to determine relative levels of human vs non-human sialylation, oligosaccharide profiling, and detailed glycan structure analysis.
