= International School of The Hague =

International school

International School of the Hague
- The school is built in a modernist architectural style

Location
- Wijndaelerweg 11, Kijkduin; The Hague, 2554 BX; Netherlands; 52.059320°N 4.222500°E

Information
- Other name: ISH
- Type: Non profit, state subsidised private, international secondary and primary school
- Motto: Curious, Connected and Compassionate
- Established: 1983; 43 years ago
- School board: Rijnlands Lyceum Foundation
- Principal (Primary): Janice Humpleby
- Principal (Secondary): Rubin Borges
- Faculty: Approx. 250
- Years: 1–13
- Gender: Mixed
- Enrollment: Approx. 2000
- Colours: Black and white
- Mascot: Silverbacks
- Rival: American School of The Hague; British School in the Netherlands
- Website: ishthehague.nl

The International School of The Hague (often abbreviated as ISH), established in 1983, is an international primary and secondary school in the vicinity of Kijkduin, The Hague.

The school was originally located on Theo Mann-Bouwmeesterlaan in Duinzigt, where an assisted living facility is now located. It moved to its current site on Wijndaelerweg in Loosduinen, in 2007. As of 2024, it has 2000 students, making it one of the largest International Schools in the Netherlands. The current primary school principal is Rubin Borges and the acting secondary school principal is Annette Sloan.

== School Profile ==
The ISH is one of several schools catering to the large international community of The Hague, which exists as a result of the many international organisations, embassies and companies located in the area, such as the European Patent Organisation, Organisation for the Prohibition of Chemical Weapons, Shell plc and the International Court of Justice.

The student body of the school consists of children and young people coming from around the world, aged 4 to 18. It became an IB World School in June 1985. The Primary School became the first school in the world to receive accreditation at 'Mastering' level from the International Primary Curriculum. It is a co-educational day school. The school is located in a new building completed in 2006. The school also has use of sports fields in the vicinity. It is subsidised by the Dutch Ministry of Education, Culture and Science and subject to Ministry regulation.

=== Location ===
After many years in its location at Theo Mann Bouwmeesterlaan 75, the ISH announced in 2002 that it would move to a new location, Wijndaelerduin 1, in Kijkduin. The relocation was completed in January 2007.

On April 21, 2007, Queen Beatrix of the Netherlands officially opened the new school building.

=== Facilities ===
The school has a total student capacity of approximately 2000 people. In the secondary building, there is a 350-seats auditorium inside the school. It also has two full sized, fully equipped gyms. There are two computer labs (each equipped with 30 iMacs), seven equipped science labs as well as an expanded library. The school has a canteen, designed to fit 200–350 people. Also, the school has expanded their capacity by including two, two-storey portacabins. There is a car park for staff on the school campus who are privileged to do so; student parking is unavailable.

=== Curricula ===
The primary school offers the International Primary Curriculum for students between the ages of 4 and 11, while the secondary school offers the International Baccalaureate Middle Years Programme (IB MYP) for students between the ages of 11 and 16 and the International Baccalaureate Diploma Programme (IB DP) and International Baccalaureate Career-related Programme (IB CP) for students between the ages of 16 and 18.

All lessons, apart from foreign language courses, are taught in English. The study of Dutch is compulsory for students except those in the IB Diploma Programme. The ISH supports mother tongue education, current provision including Dutch, French, German, Spanish, Italian, Portuguese and soon Romanian and Chinese. Although only Dutch, French, German and Spanish are available in secondary.

For those students whose native language is other than English, or for those with little familiarity with the language, the ISH offers English support lessons in both "beginner" and "transition" levels. Crash courses in English for beginners are provided in the Learning Support Centre (LSC).

Support for Special Educational Needs (SEN) is available.

The school also offers a wide range of optional after-school activities, including music lessons.

=== Model United Nations ===
The 2006 MUNISH conference, which took place from October 12 to October 15, 2006

The ISH hosts its own annual Model United Nations conference, known as MUNISH. Hundreds of students from other schools (including the British School of the Netherlands, American School of The Hague and also the Rijnlands Lyceum Oegstgeest) attend. The ISH also contributes to THIMUN, the oldest and largest model United Nations conference for high school (secondary) students in Europe and USA.

== See also ==
- List of model United Nations conferences
- American School of The Hague
- The British School in the Netherlands
