= Colin Hannaford =

British educator and writer

- Born: 1943; Plymouth, England
- Died: 22 July 2022 (age 79); Oxford, England
- Occupation: Teacher
- Writing career
- Subjects: Mathematics Education, Education Reform
- Website: www.channaford.com

Colin William Barter Hannaford was a British mathematics educator, author, and advocate for education reform.

== Early life, education, and career ==
Hannaford was born in 1943 in Plymouth, England during a bombing raid. He joined the British Army at the age of 17, where he earned a degree in mechanical engineering in 1967.

At the age of 29, Hannaford was involuntarily committed to an army psychiatric hospital. Hannaford claims the incident was politically motivated, in response to his criticism of British policy in Ireland. After three weeks, he was found sane and released.

After retiring from the army, Hannaford trained as a mathematics teacher at the University of Cambridge from 1975 to 1976. In 1976, he began teaching mathematics at Magdalen College School in Oxford, England. He then became the head of mathematics at the European School in Culham, where he taught for several decades, until 2004.

== Education reform ==
Based on his experience as a mathematics teacher, Hannaford has advocated for a major shift in mathematics education to focus on critical thinking instead of memorization. He has described his teaching philosophy as an application of the Socratic method to the classroom.

In 2009, Hannaford hosted a conference for the Qatar Foundation at Windsor Castle called Giving Peace a Voice, which aimed to show that children and students can practice critical and receptive discourse in mathematics lessons.

In 2014, Hannaford published his book Educating Messiahs, a collection of essays that he had previously shared with former students on Facebook, in which he expresses his hopes to teach students to think critically and learn to respectfully debate and disagree with one another.

In 2018, Hannaford published a booklet from the point of view of his dog, Amadeus, which gained the support of Blackwell's in Oxford, who provided free copies for children. In this booklet, he outlines his wish for students to no longer be categorised by perceived academic success.

== Books ==
- 473959 (2007), ISBN 978-1425109424
- Educating Messiahs (2014), ISBN 978-1-4669-9401-0
- Amadeus Teaches: Learning Together, Staying Strong (2018), ISBN 978-1720192152
- APE BRAINS TO COSMIC MINDS: the painful evolution of humankind (2018), ISBN 978-1790477630
- God is Evolution: Harvest of Souls (2019), ISBN 978-1708316785
- A TIDAL WAVE OF HUMAN CONSCIOUSNESS: To Stop Wars (2021), ASIN B09R4HLTWW

== Awards and honours ==
Hannaford was nominated for the Canadian Parliament Peace Prize in 1998, and won the Upton Sinclair Award for Educational Innovation in 2008.

Hannaford received the Chadwick Prize for best essay by the Oxford Philosophical Society in 1996 for a paper titled "A THESIS: That the Development of a Rational, Innovative Society, Internally Harmonious and Tolerant of Dissent, Depends on Understanding the Original Connection between Mathematics and Democracy".
