= Estonian Entrepreneurship University of Applied Sciences =

Vocational university in Tallinn, Estonia

- Eesti Ettevõtluskõrgkool Mainor
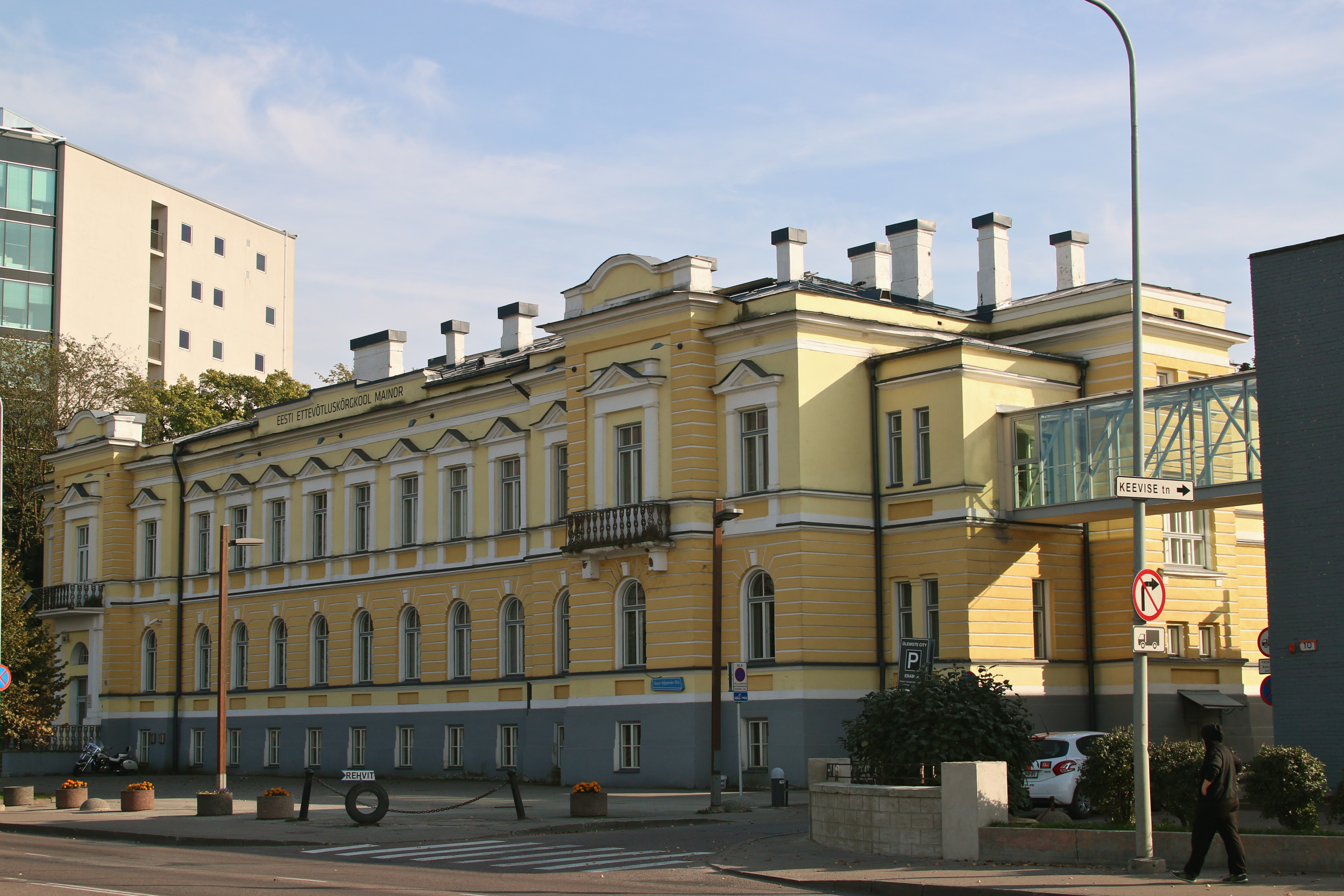
- Other name: Mainor Business School
- Type: Private vocational university
- Established: 1992; 34 years ago
- Students: 1,600
- Location: Tallinn, Estonia; 59°25′22″N 24°47′52″E

Estonian Entrepreneurship University of Applied Sciences (EUAS, Estonian: Eesti Ettevõtluskõrgkool Mainor, formerly known in English as Mainor Business School) is a private vocational university located in the Ülemiste City business park in Tallinn, Estonia. Founded in 1992, the university offers accredited Bachelor and Master-level degrees in Estonian, English, and Russian languages, covering such fields as business administration, finance and logistics, and software and game development. It has a student body of over 1,600 students, about 100 of whom are international students.

Since 2017, EUAS has been involved in a national cross-university entrepreneurship training program funded by the Estonian Ministry of Education and Research. The university is also notable for opening Estonia's first undergraduate degree program in Information Science taught in English, primarily aimed at expats.

While primarily a teaching institution, EUAS has been actively involved in research on entrepreneurship education and applied higher education.

== See also ==
- List of universities in Estonia
