= Kelmiküla =

Subdistrict of Tallinn, Estonia

Coordinates: 59.436522°N 24.729463°E

- Subdistrict of Tallinn
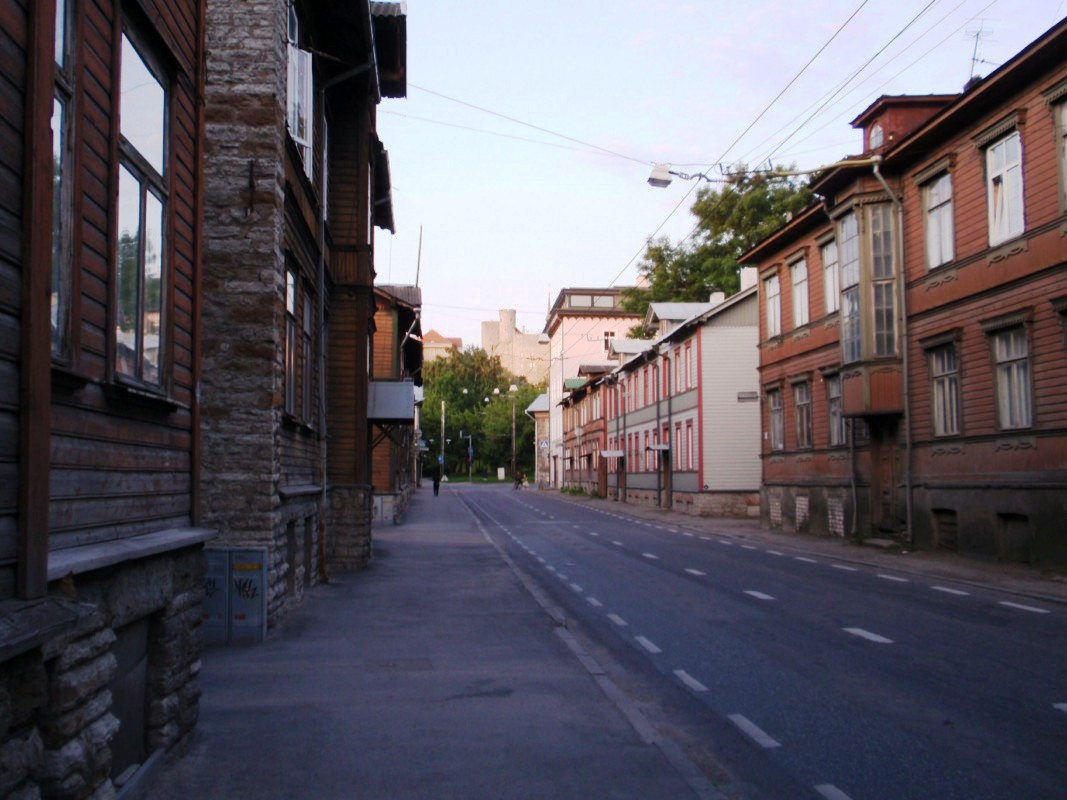
- Tehnika is the main street in Kelmiküla.

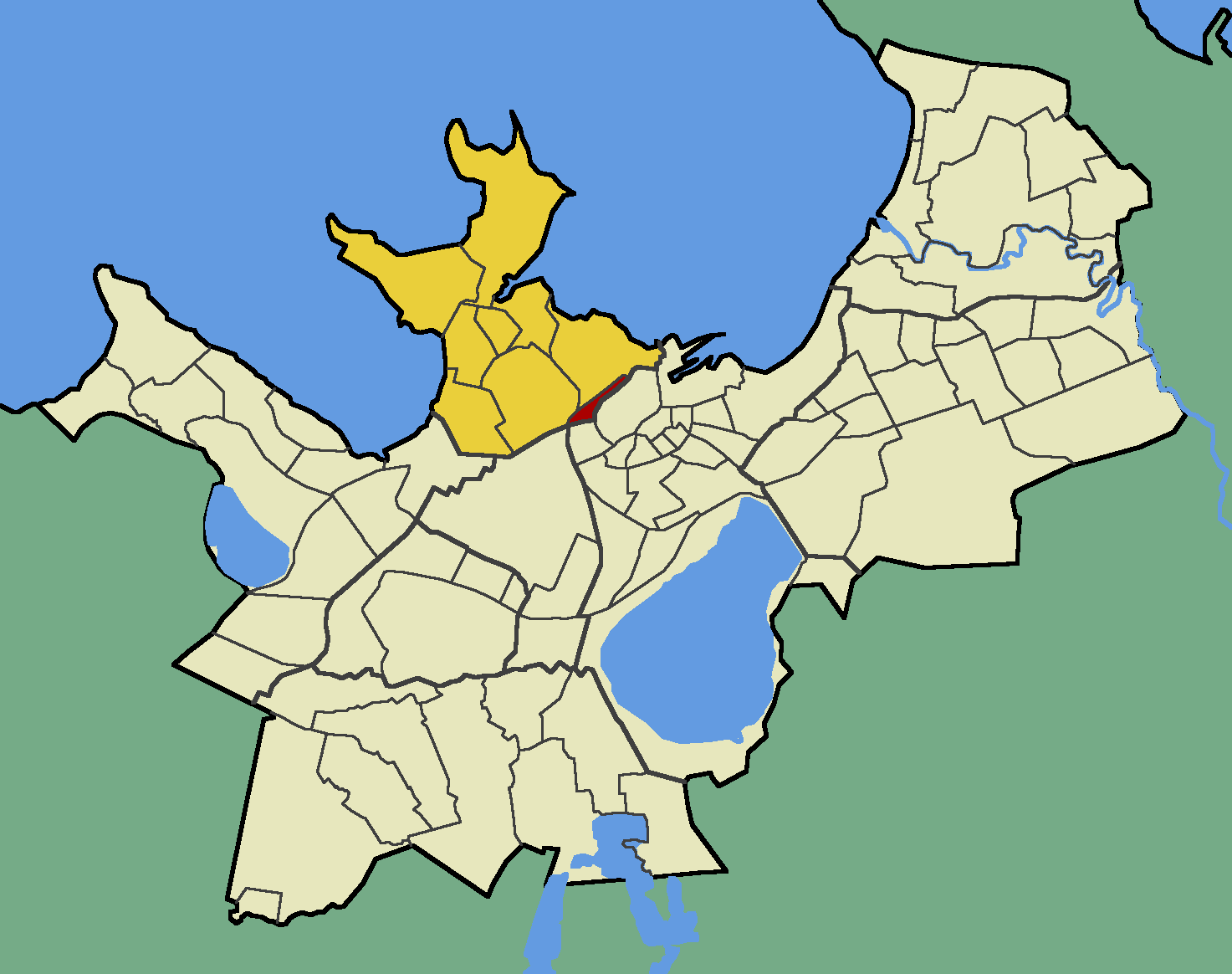
- Kelmiküla within Põhja-Tallinn.
- Country: Estonia
- County: Harju County
- City: Tallinn
- District: Põhja-Tallinn

Population (01.01.2015)
  - Total: 1,101

Kelmiküla (Estonian for "Rascal Village" or "Rogue Village") is a subdistrict (asum) in the district of Põhja-Tallinn (North Tallinn), Tallinn, the capital of Estonia. It has a population of 1,402 (As of 1 January 2022).

== Gallery ==
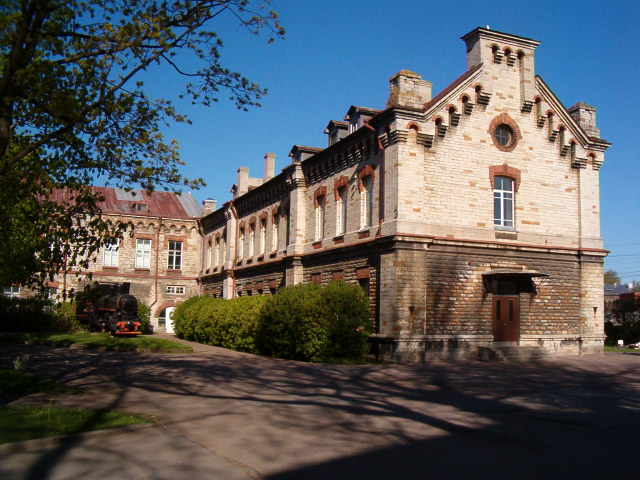
Former location of the "Tallinn Railway Technical School", now home to Tallinn European School.

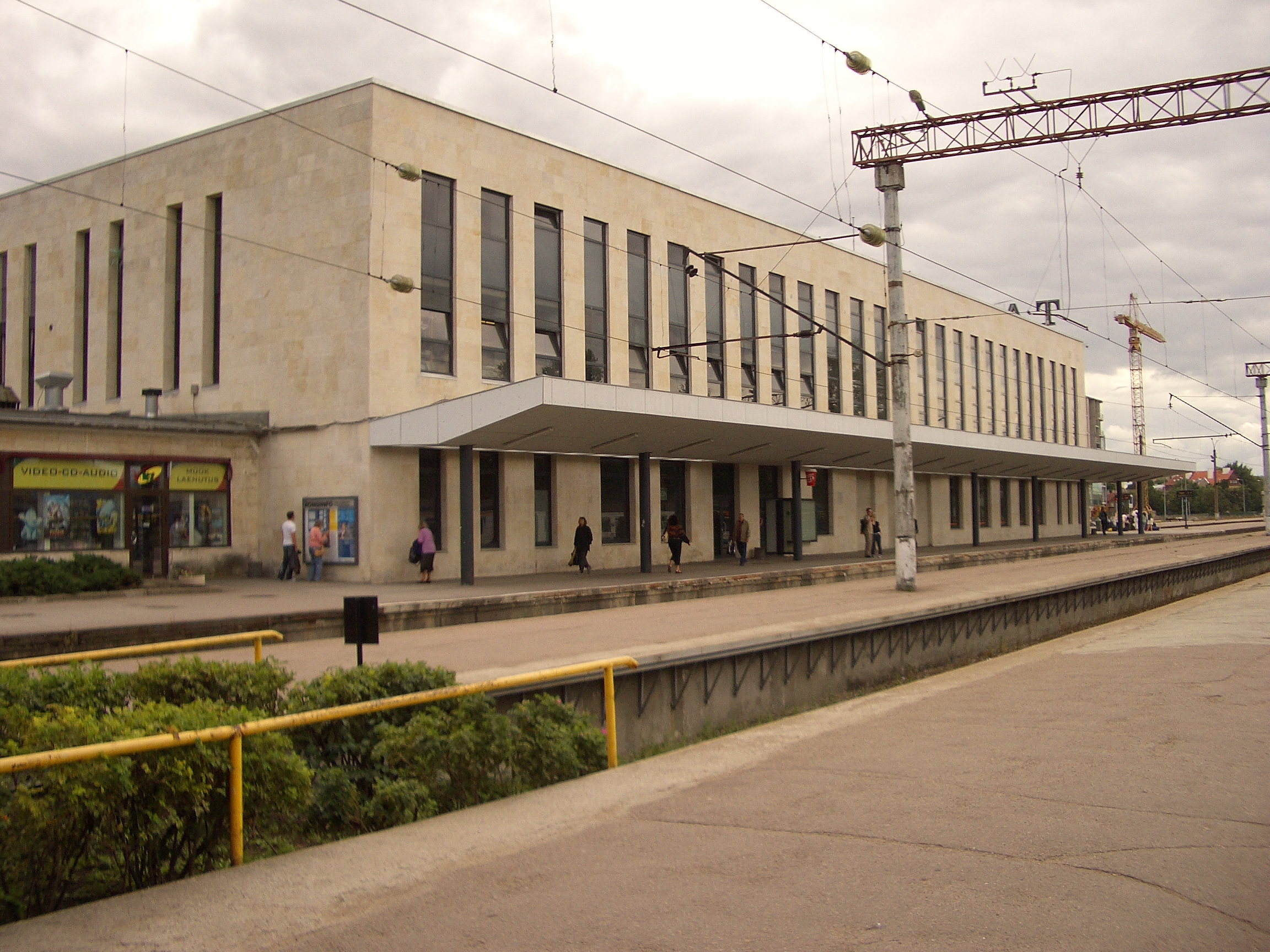
Tallinn main railway station "Balti jaam".

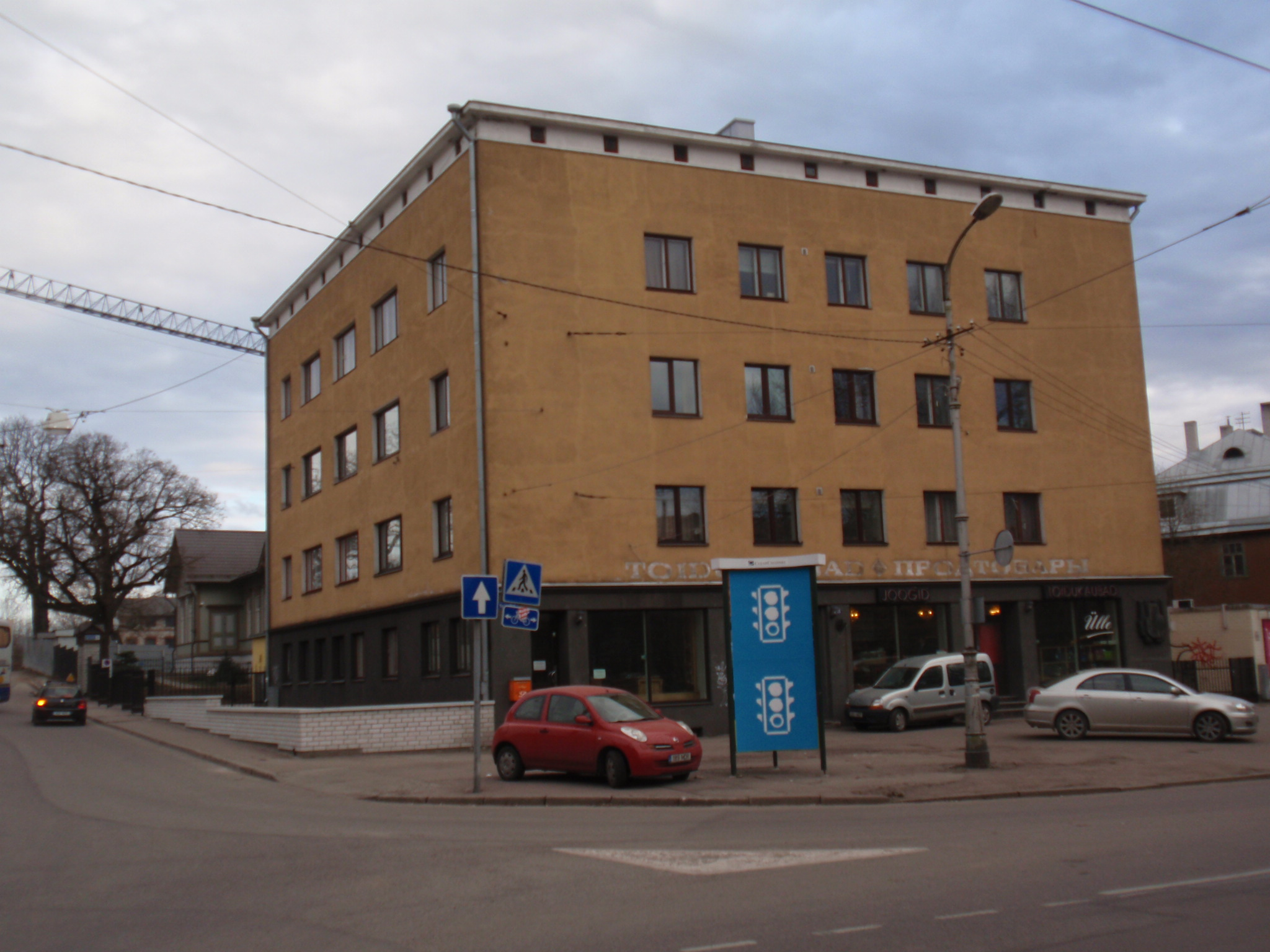
House on Tehnika street where artist Adamson-Eric (1902–1968) lived.
