= European School Ljubljana =

- Evropska šola Ljubljana

Location
- Aškerčeva cesta 1 Ljubljana, 1000; Slovenia
- Coordinates: 46°2′46.8″N 14°29′59.5″E

Information
- Other name: ESLJ
- Established: 2018
- Oversight: Ljubljana School Centre
- Head teacher: Darinka Cankar
- Gender: Mixed
- Age range: 6 to 18
- Accreditation: Accredited by the European Schools
- Website: eslj.sclj.si/en

The European School Ljubljana (Slovene: Evropska šola Ljubljana) is a co-educational, Accredited European School in Ljubljana, Slovenia that serves students age 6 to 18. It was established in 2018 and is part of the Ljubljana School Centre. In the 2019/20 academic year the school offered programs in English and Slovene, and language instruction in French, German, Lithuanian, and Spanish. The school is certified to offer the European Baccalaureate as its secondary leaving qualification.

== Location ==
The school is located in Ljubljana's Center District in the premises of the Ljubljana School Centre (Slovene: Šolski center Ljubljana), housed in a former Austro-Hungarian trade school built in 1911. The immediate surroundings include the University of Ljubljana's Faculty of Pharmacy to the west, the Faculty of Arts to the north, the French embassy to the east, and residential housing to the south. A section of the wall from the Roman colony of Emona stands immediately south of the school.

== See also ==
- Accredited European School
- European Baccalaureate
- European Schools
