= Adamson-Eric =

Estonian artist

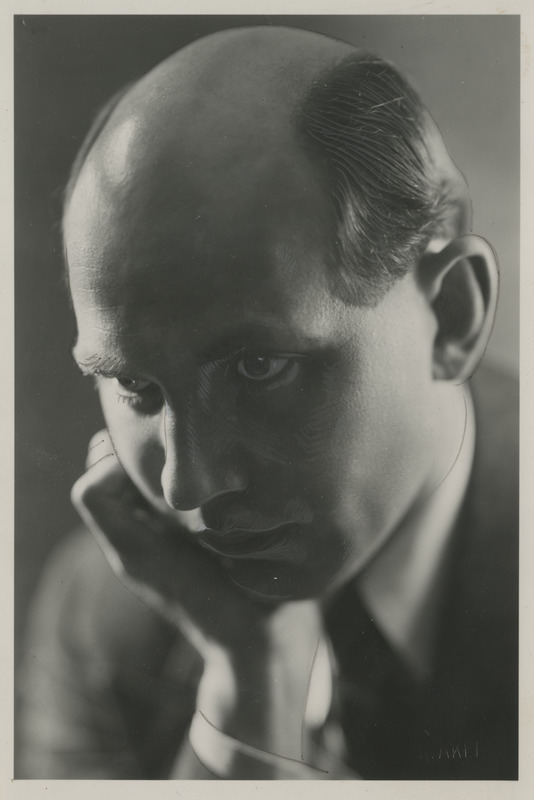
- Born: Erich Carl Hugo Adamson; 18 August 1902; Dorpat, Kreis Dorpat, Governorate of Livonia, Russian Empire
- Died: 2 December 1968 (aged 66); Tallinn, then part of Estonian SSR, Soviet Union
- Known for: Painting, decorative arts

Erich Carl Hugo Adamson (more commonly known as Adamson-Eric; 18 August 1902 – 2 December 1968) was an Estonian artist who worked mainly within the medium of painting in applied art.

== Life ==
Erich Carl Hugo Adamson was born 18 August 1902 in Tartu. He was the fourth child of Jaan and Anna Adamson. Adamson attended school at Hugo Treffner Gymnasium in his native Estonia before relocating to Berlin to study at the Charlottenburg Art and Crafts School. After studying in Berlin, Adamson then moved to Paris and studied with such artists as Charles Guérin, Roger Bissière, Moise Kisling, and André Lhote before entering the private academy of Russian artist Vasili Shukhaev in 1925 and concentrating in the media of art deco and Neue Sachlichkeit.

In June–July 1928, Adamson-Eric, along with fellow Estonian artists Eduard Wiiralt and Kristjan Teder finally opened an art exhibition in Tallinn. Adamson's career as an artist spanned nearly four decades. He died in Tallinn, where many of his works are on permanent display in the Adamson-Eric Museum on Lühike jalg Street. He is buried at Tallinn's Forest Cemetery.

== Gallery ==
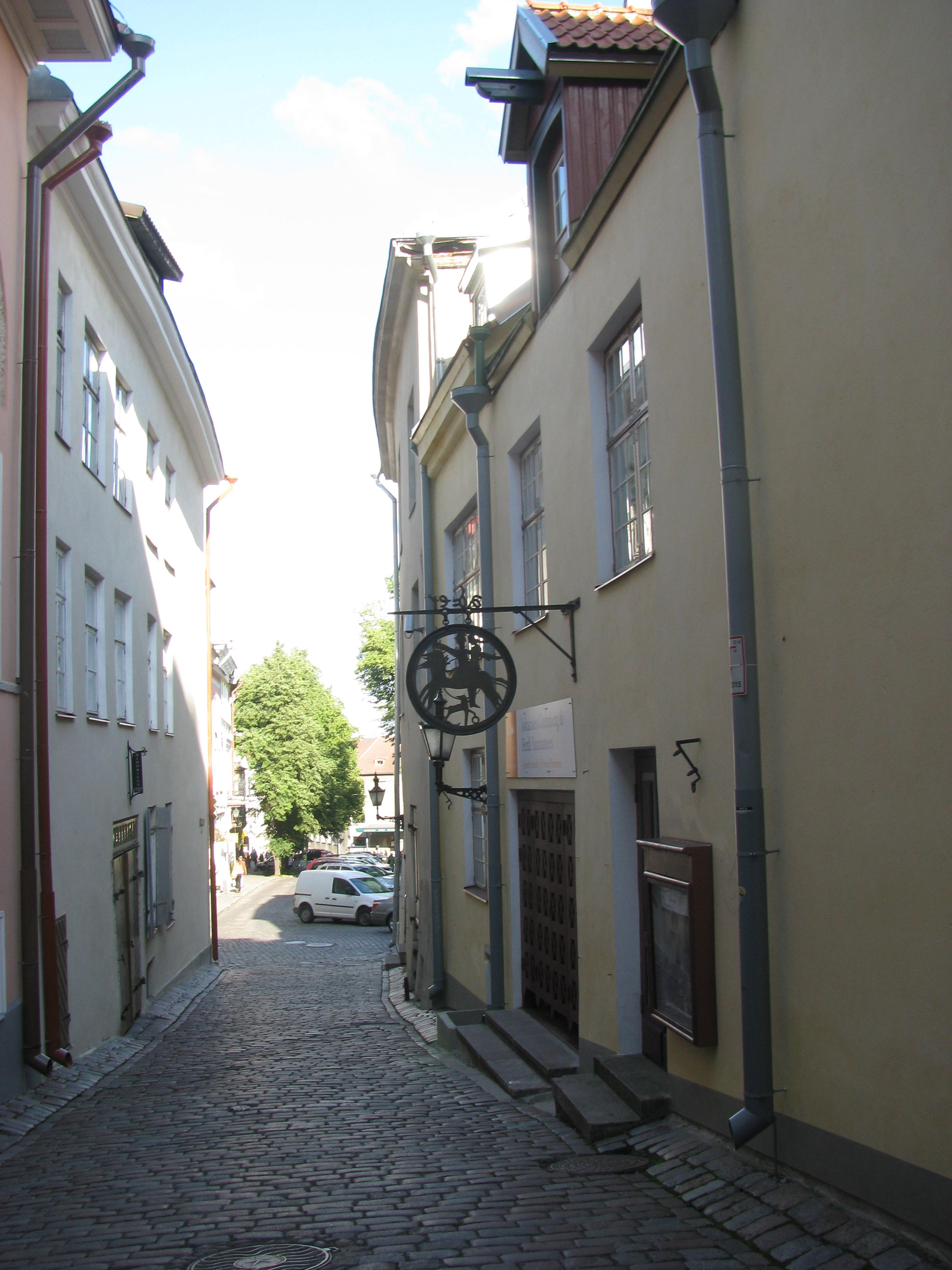
Adamson-Eric's house museum in Tallinn Old Town.

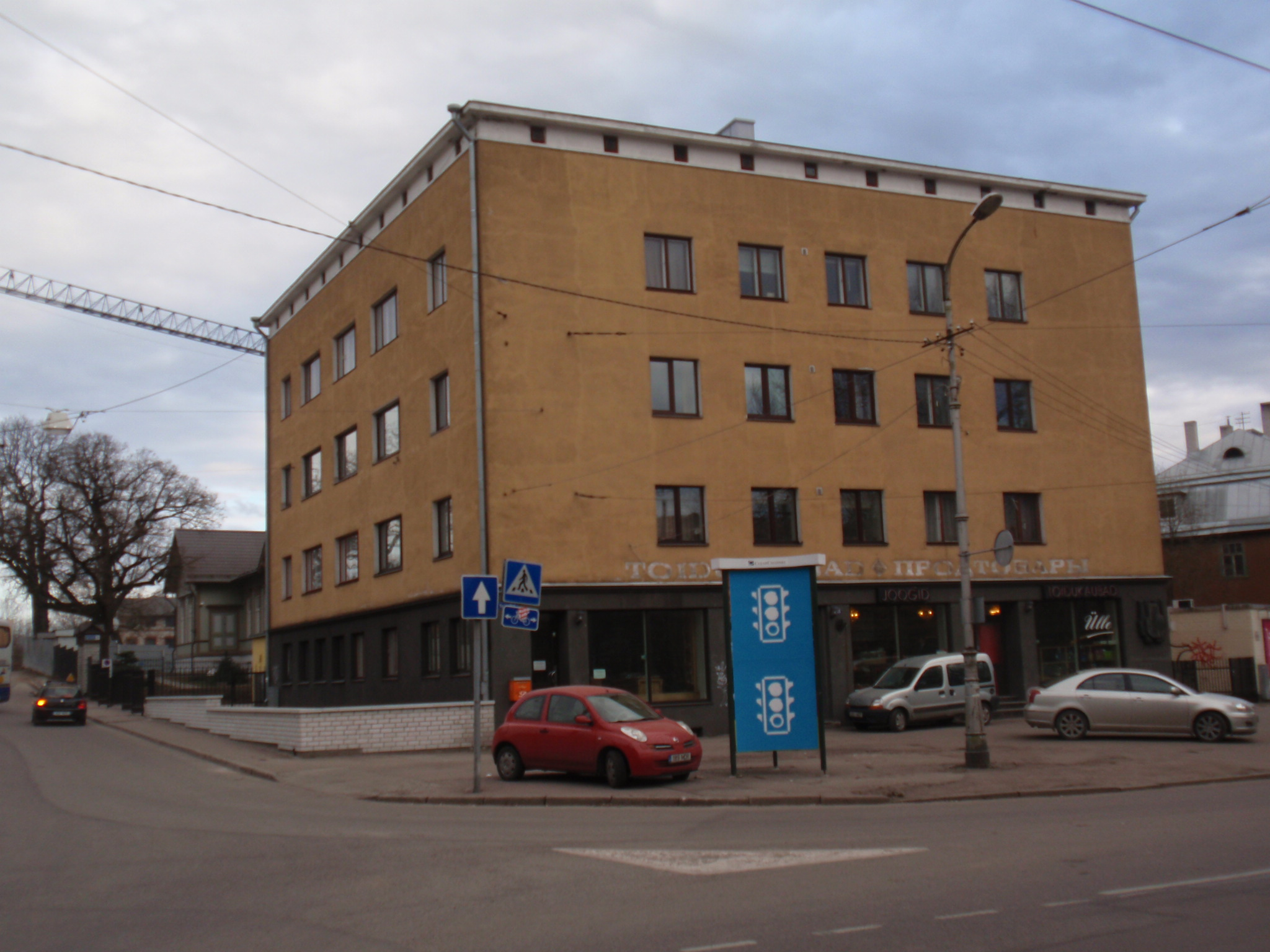
House in Kelmiküla, Tallinn where Adamson-Eric lived from 1936 to 1968.
