= European School of Paris-La Défense =

- Ecole Européenne Paris-La Défense
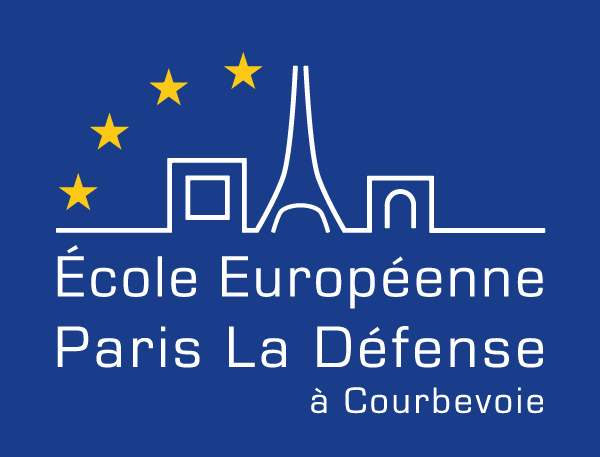

Location
- 80 rue Eugène Caron (Nursery & Primary); 13 rue de l’industrie (Secondary); Courbevoie; France; 48.896°N 2.242°E

Information
- Established: 2 September 2019
- Director: Valérie Ficara (2019-2023), then Marion Marchal, proviseur of lycée international Lucie-Aubrac
- Gender: Mixed
- Age range: 4 to 16 (in 2019)
- Enrolment: 137 (2019-2020)
  - Nursery: 43
  - Primary: 59
  - Secondary: 35
- Accreditation: Accredited by the European Schools
- Website: www.ee-parisladefense.ac-versailles.fr

The European School of Paris-La Défense (French: École Européenne Paris-La Défense) is a public Accredited European School in the business district of La Défense near Paris, France. Founded in 2019, it is an all-through school, which offers a multicultural and multilingual education leading to the European Baccalaureate as its secondary leaving qualification.

== History ==
The European School of Paris-La Défense was set up on initiative of the French Government, mainly to accommodate children of staff working for the European Banking Authority after its move from London to Paris in 2019. It was inaugurated on 2 September 2019.

== Legal status ==
Following the successful conclusion of its 2019 audit, the European School of Paris-La Défense is set to receive its initial accreditation, by the Board of Governors of the European Schools, to teach nursery to fifth-year secondary of the European School system.

The European School of Paris-La Défense is recognized as public school under French law, with an agreement with the European Union obliging it to prioritise, for enrolment purposes, the children of EU staff, in return for the receipt of funds proportional to the number of children of EU staff enrolled in the school.

== Multilingual curriculum ==
Students must enrol in either the English or the French section of the school and are generally instructed in the language of the respective section. Students must then choose from either French, English, or German for their second language, which becomes the language of instruction for the History, Geography and Ethics curriculum from the third-year secondary. Students are also expected to take a third language upon entering the secondary school.

== See also ==
- Accredited European School
- European Baccalaureate
- European Schools
