= Europa School UK =

School in Oxfordshire, England

Location
- Thame Lane; Culham, Oxfordshire, OX14 3DZ; England; 51°39′22″N 1°15′28″W

Information
- Other name: ESUK
- Type: Free school; IB World School
- Established: 21 September 2012
- Department for Education URN: 138269 Tables
- Ofsted: Reports
- Principal: Lynn Wood
- Gender: Mixed
- Age range: 4 to 18
- Enrolment: 901 (2019–2020)
  - Nursery: 174
  - Primary: 364
  - Secondary: 363
- Accreditation: Accredited by the European Schools (2012-2021) and the International Baccalaureate Organisation (2020-Present)
- Website: europaschooluk.org

The Europa School UK is an all-through, free school and IB world school located in Culham near Abingdon in Oxfordshire. It was founded in 2012 by stakeholders of the European School, Culham and subsumed the former school's campus upon its closure in 2017. It now offers the International Baccalaureate Diploma Programme and Middle Years Programme in the secondary section and a bilingual curriculum in primary with English and one of German, French, or Spanish. From its foundation until 31 August 2021, it was the only Accredited European School in the United Kingdom. This status was lost due to Brexit.

== History ==
Following the announcement of the closure of the European School, Culham due to the European Commission's decision to redeploy staff based at the Oxfordshire-based Joint European Torus (JET) fusion energy research programme to its successor programme, ITER, in Cadarache, France, stakeholders founded a charitable organisation, the "English Trust for European Education", in 2008, to investigate a means of continuing to provide the school's multilingual and multicultural curriculum, which culminates in the bilingual diploma, the European Baccalaureate. (Note: The ETEE was formally dissolved in May 2020 with all funds transferred to the Association for Language Learning.) This resulted in the founding of the Europa School, UK, as an Accredited European School, which opened its doors on 21 September 2012 in a ceremony attended by Lord Hill of Oareford and John Howell MP. The school's Accredited European School status differed from the European School, Culham it replaced, in that its financing and administration requirements must be dealt with under the national educational framework, rather than directly by the intergovernmental organisation of the European Schools. Initially only the primary and nursery sections of the school operated until the formal closure of the European School, Culham in August 2017, where after the secondary school began to operate and the school began offering the European Baccalaureate programme.

However, following the June 2016 UK referendum in favour of leaving the European Union (EU), the UK signalled its intent to withdraw from the Convention Defining the Statute of the European Schools; the enacted Brexit withdrawal agreement provides for the UK to leave the intergovernmental organisation, "the European Schools" — a distinct entity from the EU — at the end of the academic year ongoing at the end of the transition period. Furthermore, regulations of the European Schools restrict its Board of Governors to only providing accredited status to schools operating within the EU. The UK's withdrawal from the EU on 31 January 2020 prevented the organisation from renewing the Europa School UK's accredited status beyond its current period. Uncertainty over how long the school could continue to offer the European Baccalaureate programme during the protracted withdrawal negotiations led the Europa School UK to cease offering the European Baccalaureate following the 2021 graduation, and to secure accreditation to offer the International Baccalaureate Diploma Programme from the 2020–2021 academic year onwards.

== Legal status ==
The Europa School UK is defined as a "free school" academy under English law. It is accredited by the International Baccalaureate Organisation to offer the IBDP. It was also formerly accredited by the Board of Governors of the European Schools as an Accredited European School, but that status was lost on 31 August 2021.

== See also ==
- European School, Culham
