= European School of Strasbourg =

- Ecole Européenne de Strasbourg

Location
- 2 Rue Peter Schwarber; Strasbourg; France; 48.600325°N 7.776550°E

Information
- Other name: EES
- Established: 4 September 2008
- Director: Corinne Chan Yue Tack
- Gender: Mixed
- Age range: 4 to 18
- Enrolment: 967 (2018-2019)
  - Nursery: 82
  - Primary: 351
  - Secondary: 535
- Student Union/Association: EES Student Board
- Accreditation: Accredited by the European Schools
- Website: ee-strasbourg.eu/en

The European School of Strasbourg (French: École Européenne de Strasbourg), or EES, is a public Accredited European School in Strasbourg, France. Founded in 2008, it is an all-through school, which offers a multicultural and multilingual education leading to the European Baccalaureate as its secondary leaving qualification.

== History ==
The European School of Strasbourg was inaugurated on 4 September 2008 in a ceremony attended by, amongst other dignitaries, the French Minister of Education, Xavier Darcos, the Secretary-General of the Council of Europe, Terry Davis, and the Mayor of Strasbourg, Roland Ries.

The school originally shared a campus with another local French secondary school, the Collège Vauban, before moving into its current purpose built campus, located in the Strasbourg quarter of Robertsau, in 2015. It is based in proximity to Strasbourg's European district, the location of various institutions, agencies, and other bodies of the European Union, and the seat of the Council of Europe.

== Legal status ==
The school received its initial status as an Accredited European School from the Board of Governors of the European Schools in November 2009, and received accreditation to offer the European Baccalaureate programme in May 2013.

EES is recognized as a public school under French law, with an agreement with the European Union obliging it to prioritise, for enrollment purposes, the children of EU staff, in return for the receipt of funds proportional to the number of children of EU staff enrolled in the school.

== Multilingual curriculum ==
Students at the European School of Strasbourg must enrol in either the English, French or German sections of the school. Students enrolled in the school are generally instructed in the language of the respective section. Students must then choose from either English, French or German for their second language, which becomes the language of instruction for the History, Geography and Ethics curriculum from the third-year secondary. Students are also expected to take a third language upon entering the secondary school.

The school is famous for having a great diversity in ethnic groups and nationalities. In 2019, students enrolled in the school represented 48 different nationalities, while teachers represented 13 different nationalities.

== See also ==
- Accredited European School
- European Baccalaureate
- European Schools
