= European School Copenhagen =

- Europaskolen København
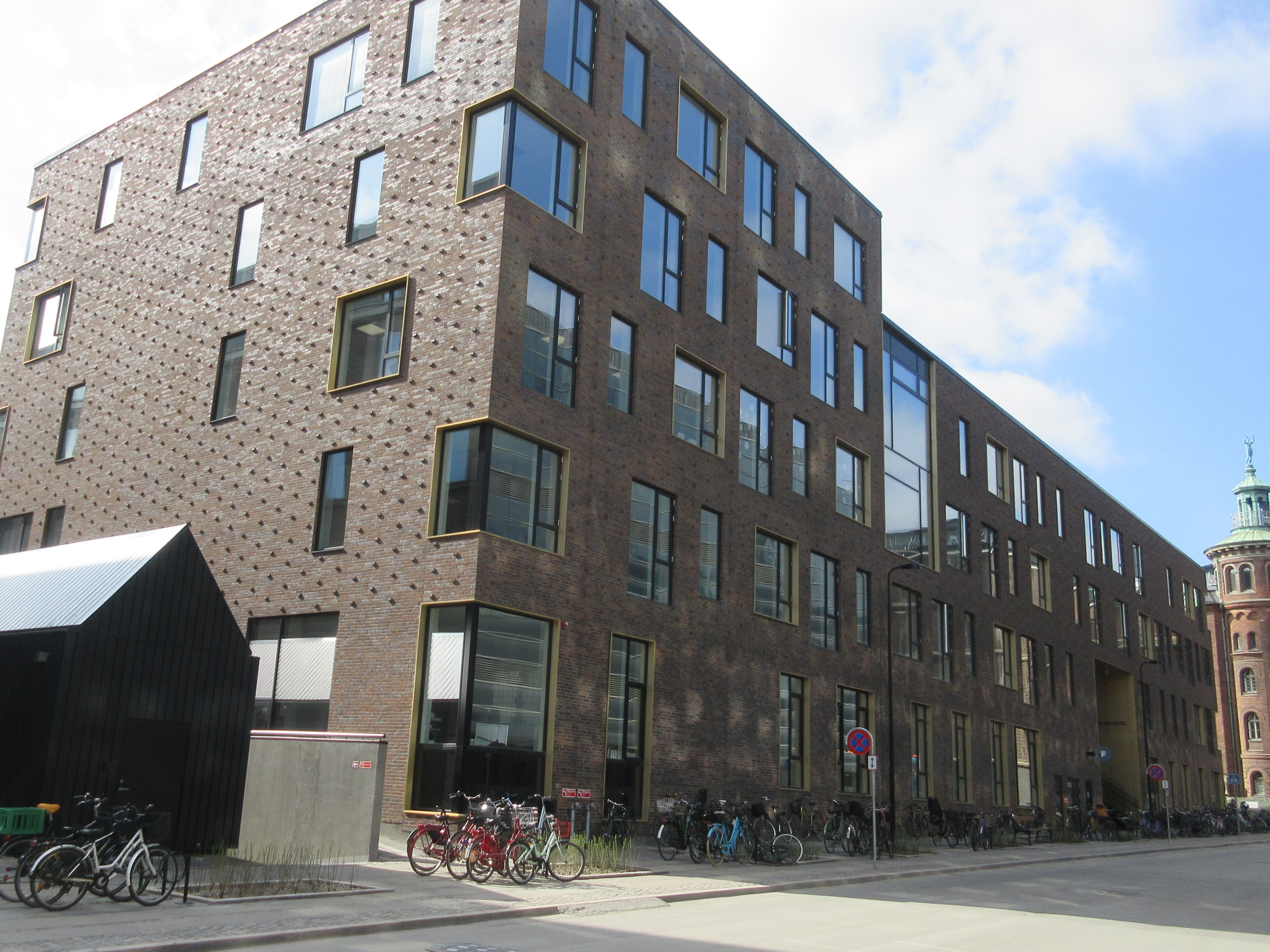

Location
- Ny Carlsberg Vej 99; Copenhagen V, DK-1799; Denmark
- Coordinates: 55.666988°N 12.534020°E ,

Information
- Established: 2014
- Head of primary: Helle Degn
- Director: Øzkan Güleryüz
- Gender: Mixed
- Age range: 5 to 19
- Enrolment: 727 (2020-21)
  - Nursery: 79
  - Primary: 323
  - Secondary: 325
- Accreditation: Accredited by the European Schools
- Affiliation: Sankt Annæ Gymnasium
- Diploma: European Baccalaureate
- Website: escph.dk

The European School Copenhagen (ESC) is an Accredited European School situated in the heart of the Carlsberg district of Copenhagen, Denmark. It caters to nursery, primary and secondary level students, leading to the European Baccalaureate as its secondary leaving qualification. The ESC is affiliated to the Sankt Annæ Gymnasium, a local Danish school, and is overseen by a joint management board of the two schools.

== History ==
The plans for the school were presented by Copenhagen Municipality, Realdania, Novo Nordisk Fonden, Nordea-fonden and Industriens Fond. Welcoming its first students in 2014, the school was initially based out of a temporary location at the South Harbour School.

A competition for the design of the new school was won by BAM Danmark, Vilhelm Lauritzen Arkitekter, Nord Arkitekter and EKJ consulting engineers. The school moved into its new building on 25 October 2018 and it was officially inaugurated on 20 November 2018.

== See also ==
- Accredited European School
- European Baccalaureate
- European Schools
