= European Fusion Development Agreement =

- Successor: EUROfusion
- Formation: 1999
- Dissolved: 2013
- Headquarters: Culham, United Kingdom; Garching, Germany
- Leader: Francesco Romanelli
- Website: efda.org

EFDA (1999 — 2013) has been followed by EUROfusion, which is a consortium of national fusion research institutes located in the European Union and Switzerland.

The European Union has a strongly coordinated nuclear fusion research programme. At the European level, the so-called EURATOM Treaty is the international legal framework under which member states cooperate in the fields of nuclear fusion research.

The European Fusion Development Agreement (EFDA) is an agreement between European fusion research institutions and the European Commission (which represents Euratom) to strengthen their coordination and collaboration, and to participate in collective activities in the field of nuclear fusion research.

In Europe, fusion research takes place in a great number of research institutes and universities. In each member state of the European Fusion Programme at least one research organisation has a "Contract of Association" with the European Commission. All the fusion research organisations and institutions of a country are connected to the program through this (these) contracted organisation(s). After the name of the contract, the groups of fusion research organisations of the member states are called "Associations".

== History ==
The European Fusion Development Agreement (EFDA) was created in 1999. Until 2008 EFDA was responsible for the exploitation of the Joint European Torus, the coordination and support of fusion-related research & development activities carried out by the Associations and by European Industry and coordination of the European contribution to large scale international collaborations, such as the ITER-project.

2008 has brought a significant change to the structure of the European Fusion Programme. The change was triggered by the signature of the ITER agreement at the end of 2006. The ITER parties had agreed to provide contributions to ITER through legal entities referred to as "Domestic Agencies". Europe has fulfilled its obligation by launching the European Domestic Agency called "Fusion for Energy", also called F4E, in March 2007.

With the appearance of F4E EFDA´s role has changed and it has been reorganised. A revised European Fusion Development Agreement entered into force on 1 January 2008 focuses on research coordination with two main objectives: to prepare for the operation and exploitation of ITER and to further develop and consolidate the knowledge base needed for overall fusion development and in particular for DEMO, the first electricity producing experimental fusion power plant being built after ITER.

== Organisation ==
EFDA has two locations, which each house a so-called Close Support Unit (CSU), responsible for part of EFDA's activities. The EFDA-CSU Garching is located in Garching, near Munich (Germany), and is hosted by the German Max-Planck Institut für Plasmaphysik. EFDA-CSU Culham is hosted by the CCFE laboratory in Culham (UK), home of the Joint European Torus facilities.

A large number of scientists and engineers from the associated laboratories work together on different projects of EFDA. The main task of the Close Support Units is to ensure that these diverse activities are integrated in a coordinated European Fusion Programme.

The EFDA management consists of the EFDA Leader (Dr. Francesco Romanelli) and the EFDA-Associate Leader for JET (Dr. Francesco Romanelli).

== Activities ==
In order to achieve its objectives EFDA conducts the following group of activities:

- Collective use of JET, the world's largest fusion experiment
- Reinforced coordination of fusion physics and technology research and development in EU laboratories.
- Training and carrier development of researchers, promoting links to universities and carrying out support actions for the benefit of the fusion programme.
- EU contributions to international collaborations outside F4E

EFDA coordinates a range of activities to be carried out by the Associations in 7 key physics and technology areas. The implementation of these activities benefits from structures so called Task Forces and Topical Groups. The European Task Forces on Plasma Wall Interaction (PWI) and on Integrated Tokamak Modelling (ITM) set up respectively in 2002 and 2003. To strengthen the co-ordination in other key areas five Topical Groups have been set up in 2008: on Fusion Materials Development, Diagnostics, Heating and Current Drive, Transport and Plasma Stability and Control.

== See also ==
- Culham Centre for Fusion Energy
