= Rijnlands Lyceum Foundation =

Educational foundation in the Netherlands

Rijnlands Lyceum Foundation Stichting Het Rijnlands Lyceum

Location
- Wassenaar, South Holland, PO Box 486, 2240 AL; Netherlands

District information
- Type: Multi-school educational foundation, Stichting
- Established: 1936
- Chair of the board: Arjan Kastelein
- Governing agency: Ministry of Education and Inspectorate of Education
- Schools: 9

Students and staff
- Students: 7,400
- Faculty: 1,100

Other information
- Website: rijnlandslyceum.nl/en/

Stichting The Rijnlands Lyceum Foundation (Dutch: Stichting Het Rijnlands Lyceum) is an educational foundation in the Netherlands encompassing nine different schools; three offering primary education and six offering secondary education. The Foundation, established in 1936, is based in Wassenaar, a suburb of The Hague.

== Management ==
The sole member and chair of the Foundation's executive board is Arjan Kastelein, who is accountable to the supervisory board chaired by Johan van der Werff. Previous chairs of the supervisory board include, Frans Weisglas, former Speaker of the House of Representatives of the Netherlands, and Hans Dijkstal, former Deputy Prime Minister of the Netherlands.

== Responsibilities ==
The Foundation is responsible for financial administration, the maintenance of buildings and IT infrastructure, and the recruitment of staff. The Foundation, as the "competent authority", is responsible for the quality of the education and is accountable to the Dutch Ministry of Education and the Dutch Education Inspectorate.

== Schools in the organisation ==
The organisation comprises nine schools:

- Rijnlands Lyceum Oegstgeest (secondary)
- Rijnlands Lyceum Sassenheim (secondary)
- Rijnlands Lyceum Wassenaar (secondary)
- International School of The Hague (secondary)
- International School of The Hague (primary)
- International School Wassenaar (secondary)
- European School The Hague (primary)
- European School The Hague (secondary)
- Eerste Nederlandse Montessorischool (primary)

The Rijnlands Lyceum Oegstgeest, Rijnlands Lyceum Sassenheim and Rijnlands Lyceum Wassenaar offer three streams of Dutch secondary education: "pre-vocational secondary education" (MAVO), "higher general continued education" (HAVO), and "preparatory scientific education" (VWO). They also offer bilingual education, in English and Dutch. In addition the Rijnlands Lyceum Oegstgeest has an international department offering the International Baccalaureate Middle Years Programme (IB MYP) and International Baccalaureate Diploma Programme (IBDP).

The International School of The Hague constitutes a primary and secondary school, offering the International Primary Curriculum, the MYP and the IB DP.

The International School Wassenaar, opened on the premises of Rijnlands Lyceum Wassenaar in 2019, offering the International Baccalaureate Middle Years Programme (IB MYP) and from April 2023 the International Baccalaureate Diploma Programme (IBDP) with the first students completing their studies in 2025. A new building to meet the demand of over 300 international pupils was begun on 24 August 2023 and was completed and open in time for the school year beginning in September 2024. The IBDP results for the first cohort of 24 students in 2025 included 96% achieving their IB Diploma with an overall average of 31 points and highest score of 40 points.

The European School The Hague opened in 2012, initially offering primary-level education, with its secondary cycle operating from 2014. The school is accredited by the Board of Governors of the European Schools to offer the European Baccalaureate bilingual diploma as its secondary leaving qualification. It prioritises, for enrolment purposes, the children of European Union staff and other non-EU European institutions based nearby.

The Eerste Nederlandse Montessorischool is a primary school offering a Montessori education.
