= Tallinn European School =

School in Tallinn

- Tallinna Euroopa Kool

Location
- Tehnika 18; Tallinn, 10149; Estonia; 59.436520°N 24.727720°E

Information
- Other name: TES
- Established: 2013
- Director: Ian Karell
- Gender: Mixed
- Age range: 4 to 18
- Enrolment: 290 (2018-2019)
  - Nursery: 38
  - Primary: 162
  - Secondary: 90
- Accreditation: Accredited by the European Schools
- Website: tes.edu.ee

Tallinn European School (Estonian: Tallinna Euroopa Kool), or TES, is a private, Accredited European School in Tallinn, Estonia. Founded in 2013, it is an all-through school which offers a multicultural and multilingual education leading to the European Baccalaureate as its secondary leaving qualification. TES is Estonia's largest international school, and the first of the Accredited European Schools, found across the European Union, to be established in the Baltic states.

== Multilingual curriculum ==
Tallinn European School currently allows students to enroll in either the English-section or French-section. Students enrolled in the school are generally instructed in the language of the respective section. Students must choose from either English, French or German for their second language, which becomes the language of instruction for History and Geography curriculum from the third-year secondary, as well as the optional Economics course available from fourth year. Students are also expected to take a third language upon entering the secondary school. Students whose mother-tongue is not covered by a language section, are enrolled in the English section, and can opt for their mother-tongue in place of English-studies, taking English as their designated second language. At present TES provides classes in ten languages for mother-tongue or foreign language programmes.

== History ==
Tallinn European School (TES) was founded in 2013 by the Innove Foundation, an independent "education competence centre" created by the Estonian Ministry of Finance.

Initially based in a building at 2, Keevise Street, in the Tallinn subdisctrict of Ülemiste, the school moved to its current location at Tehnika 18, in the Tallinn subdisctrict of Kelmiküla, in August 2018 following renovation of the buildings.

== Campus and facilities ==
The school's campus includes a canteen, a library and a gym, in addition to around 40 classrooms. It consists of three blocks (A, B, and C), with a total floor surface area of 7,200 square metres.

=== Railway heritage ===
Block A, originally built in 1880 for the "Tallinn Railway Technical School", is listed for conservation under Estonian law. A separate wooden structure, built in 1895, which constituted the railway school's main building no longer stands.

Block A incorporates elements of Gothic Revival architecture, including a rose window, neo-Gothic arch windows, and stepped gables. The wooden ceilings, windows, and hinges were restored during renovations.

Between 1926 and 1937, the building was used by the Tallinn French School, before, what was now the "Tallinn Railway Vocational School", reoccupied the building in 1939. The school building caught fire in 1969, and was reconstructed in 1978, with the addition of a new four-storey study hall, connected directly to the historical school building.

Originally installed in 1974, a Škoda Works, Kc4-100 model, narrow-gauge steam locomotive, is still displayed on the school grounds commemorating the campus' railway heritage.

== Legal status ==
Tallinn European School is a private school owned by the "Foundation Euroopa Kool", established by the Republic of Estonia, and under the remit of the Estonian Ministry of Education and Research.

=== Accreditation ===
The Board of Governors of the European Schools signed an accreditation and cooperation agreement with TES on 11 February 2014, which accredited the schools' nursery and primary sections, and the secondary section up to the end of year 5 (age 16). The agreement extends to 31 August 2019, when upon it will require renewal. A separate agreement was signed with TES on 21 May 2013 extending the accreditation status to secondary years 6 and 7, and enabling the school to formally offer the European Baccalaureate as its secondary leaving qualification. This agreement is valid until 31 August 2020. In concordance with the rigorous accreditation process, accredited schools are routinely audited by the Boards of Inspectors of the European Schools, with the TES' last audit taking place between 10 and 14 April 2017.

=== Relationship with the European Commission ===
TES is recognised as a "Type II" European School by the European Union (EU), permitting it to receive funds proportional to the number of pupils of EU staff enrolled in the school. The arrangement was made in large part due to the proximity of the EU's agency for the Operational Management of Large-Scale IT Systems in the Area of Freedom, Security and Justice (eu-LISA).

== See also ==
- Accredited European School
- European Baccalaureate
- European Schools
