= Ülemiste Tunnel =

Road tunnel in Tallinn

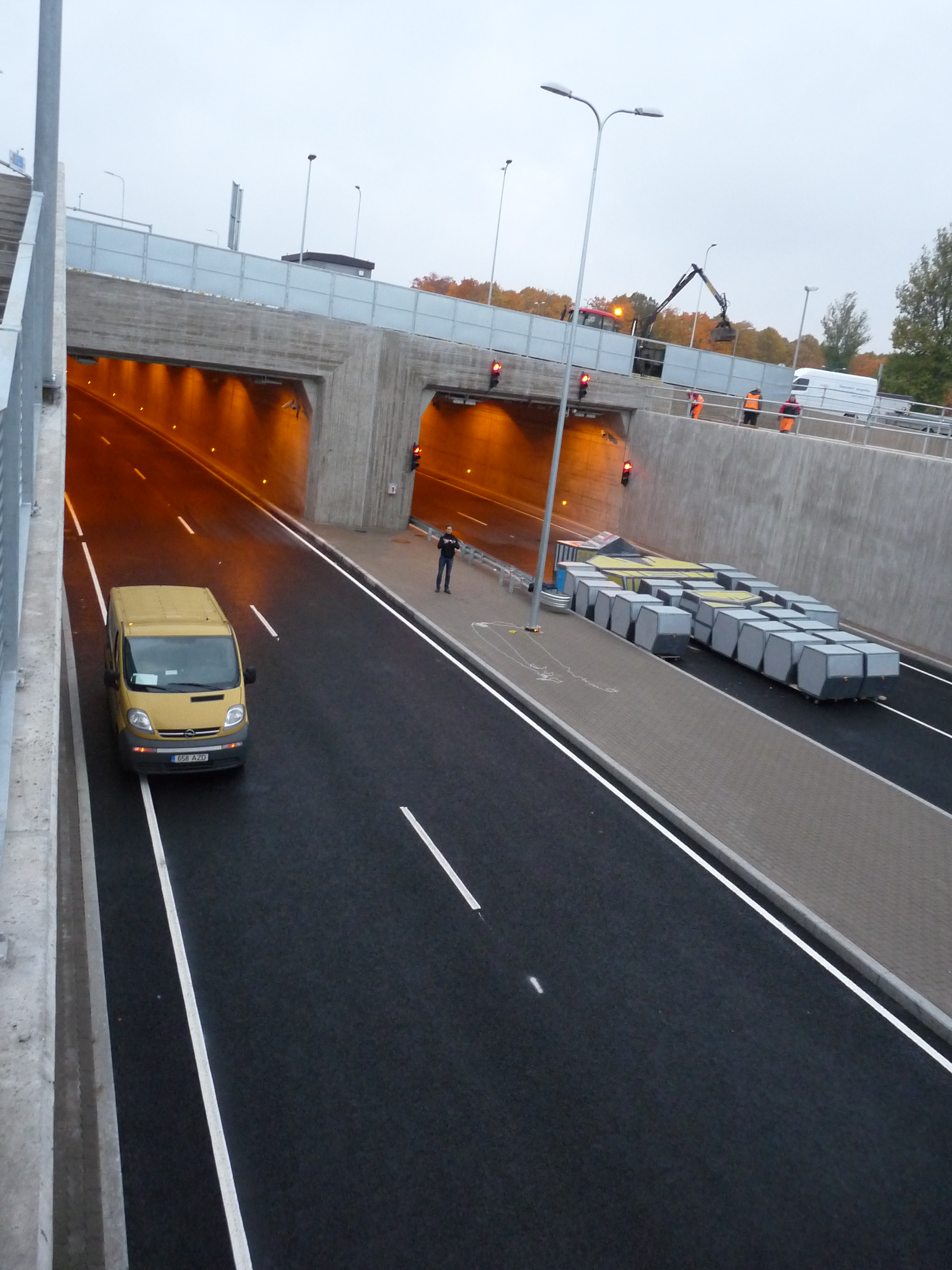
- The eastern portal
- Interactive map of Ülemiste Tunnel

Overview
- Location: Tallinn, Estonia
- Coordinates: 59°25′14″N 24°46′6″E
- Status: Active
- Route: Järvevana tee

Operation
- Opened: 2013
- Character: road

Technical
- Length: 320 metres (1,050 ft)
- No. of lanes: 4

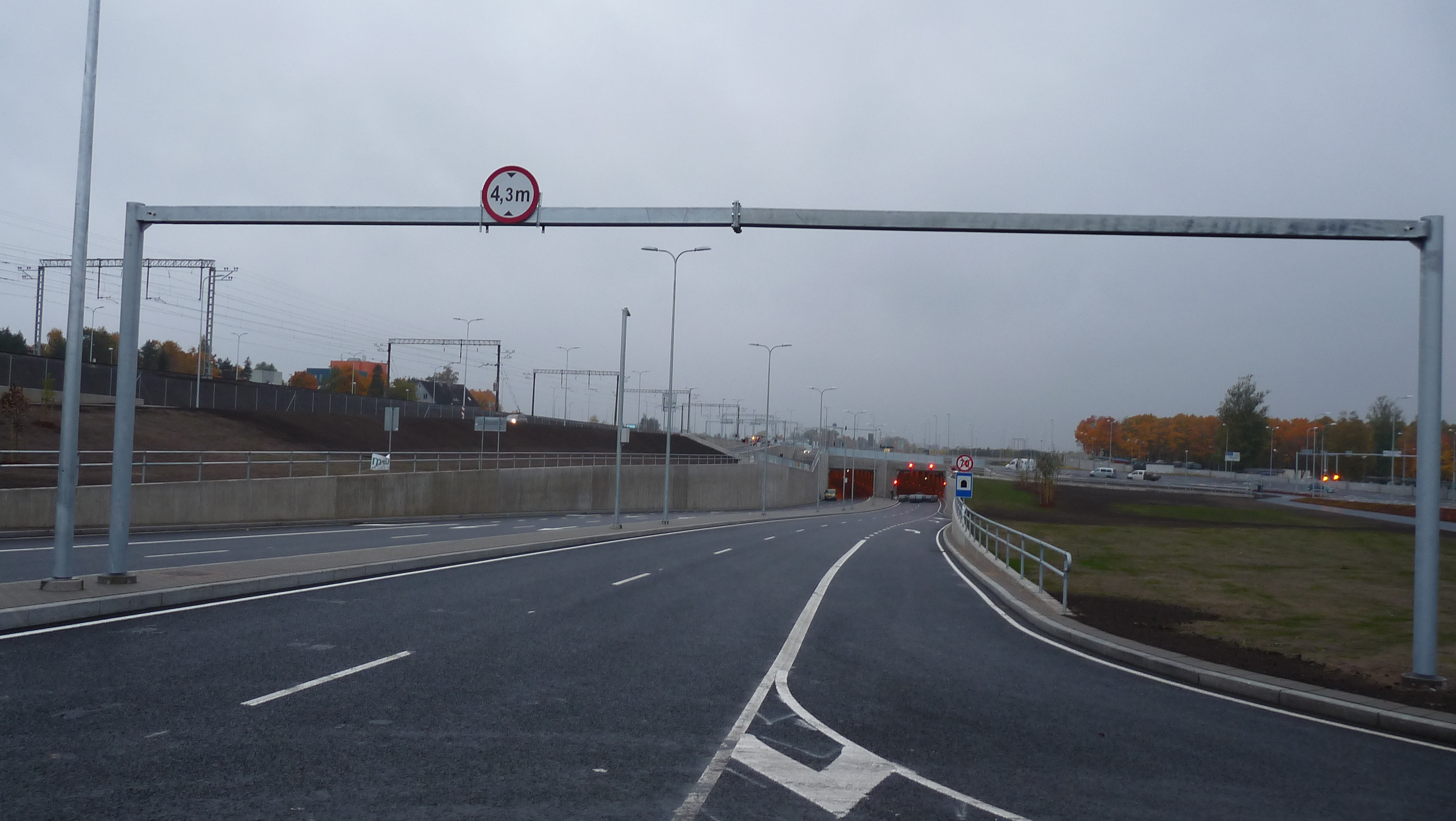
Entrance of the tunnel on Ülemiste side

The Ülemiste Tunnel is a road tunnel in Tallinn, Estonia, located southeast of the city centre near the Lake Ülemiste. The tunnel connects Peterburi road (Tallinn–Narva Road, part of E20) with Järvevana road (part of the inner beltway). Opened on 9 October 2013, the tunnel is 320 m (1,050 ft) long and consists of two parts divided by a thick concrete wall. It is the only road tunnel of its kind in Estonia.
