= Accredited European School =

An Accredited European School is a type of international school under national jurisdiction and financing, within the member states of the European Union, which have been approved, by the Board of Governors of the international organisation "The European Schools", to offer its multilingual and multicultural curriculum and the European Baccalaureate. An Accredited European School differs from a European School, in that the latter is set up, administered and financed directly by the Board of Governors of the European Schools.

The establishments originated following a 2005 report by the European Parliament, investigating the future of the European School system, particularly in how to "open up" the formerly exclusive establishments to a wider audience.

As of September 2021, there are twenty Accredited European Schools located in thirteen EU countries, with a further five schools engaged in the accreditation process.

== Legal status ==
The accredited status groups together, what were formerly known as "Type II" and "Type III" European Schools, with the only difference being that "Type II" European Schools give priority, for enrolment purposes, to children of staff of the EU institutions and are therefore entitled to receive funding from the European Commission in proportion to the number of such EU staff pupils enrolled.

== Locations ==
As of September 2021, there are twenty Accredited European Schools located in thirteen EU countries, with a further five schools engaged in the accreditation process.

School	Country	Date first accreditation agreement signed	Date first additional accreditation agreement signed	Current agreement situation	Year groups active September 2021
European School of Bruxelles-Argenteuil	Belgium	13 March 2018	N/A	Accreditation valid from 01.09.2019–31.08.2022	N1–S5
European School Brindisi	Italy	11 January 2017	19 January 2017	Accreditation valid from 01.09.2021– 31.08.2024 Additional accreditation valid from 01.09.2021–31.08.2024	N1 & P1–S7
European School Copenhagen	Denmark	10 September 2015	In the process of accreditation	Accreditation valid from 01.09.2021– 31.08.2024	N2–S6
European School The Hague	Netherlands	11 January 2013	9 January 2019	Accreditation valid from 01.09.2020– 31.08.2023 Additional accreditation valid from 01.09.2020–31.08.2023	N1–S7
International School of Differdange and Esch-sur-Alzette	Luxembourg	16 May 2017	In the process of accreditation	Accreditation valid from 01.09.2019–31.08.2022	P1–S6
Centre for European Schooling	Ireland	16 August 2007	N/A	Accreditation valid from 01.09.2020– 31.08.2023	N1–S5
International School Edward Steichen	Luxembourg	14 May 2019	N/A	Accreditation valid from 01.09.2021– 31.08.2024	N1–S4
European School of Helsinki	Finland	20 January 2009	26 May 2011	Accreditation valid from 01.09.2020– 31.08.2023 Additional accreditation valid from 01.09.2020–31.08.2023	N1–S7
School of European Education of Heraklion	Greece	15 October 2008	14 May 2014	Accreditation valid from 01.09.2019–31.08.2022 Additional accreditation valid from 01.09.2019–31.08.2022	N1–S7
International School Junglinster	Luxembourg	14 May 2019	N/A	Accreditation valid from 01.09.2021–31.08.2024	N1–S5
European School Lille Métropole	France	10 June 2020	24 July 2025	N1-S5: accreditation valid from 01.09.2025-31.08.2028 S6-S7: accreditation valid from 01.09.2024-31.08.2027	N1-S7
European School Ljubljana	Slovenia	20 June 2019	N/A	Accreditation valid from 01.09.2021– 31.08.2024	N1–S4
International School Provence-Alpes-Côte d'Azur de Manosque	France	24 May 2011	4 September 2012	Accreditation valid from 01.09.2021–31.08.2024	S1–S7
Mondorf-les-Bains International School	Luxembourg	14 May 2019	N/A	Accreditation valid from 01.09.2021– 31.08.2024	P1–4, S1–4
School for Europe of Parma	Italy	26 July 2007	14 January 2009	Accreditation valid from 01.09.2021– 31.08.2024 Additional accreditation valid from 01.09.2021–31.08.2024	N1–S7
European School of Paris-La Défense	France	19 June 2020	26 May 2021	Accreditation valid from 01.09.2019– 31.08.2022 Additional accreditation valid from 01.09.2020–31.08.2023	N1–S7
European School RheinMain	Germany	8 May 2013	4 September 2015	Accreditation valid from 01.09.2021– 31.08.2024 Additional accreditation valid from 01.09.2021–31.08.2024	N1–S7
European School of Strasbourg	France	16 November 2009	21 May 2013	Accreditation valid from 01.09.2020–31.08.2023 Additional accreditation valid from 01.09.2020–31.08.2023	N1–S7
Tallinn European School	Estonia	11 February 2014	30 August 2017	Accreditation valid from 01.09.2019–31.08.2022 Additional accreditation valid from 01.09.2019–31.08.2022	N1–S7
International European School Warsaw	Poland	24 June 2021	N/A	Accreditation valid from 01.09.2021–31.08.2024	N1–P5, S1–S4
European School Templin	Germany	Pending accreditation	N/A	N/A	N/A
European School, Saarland	Germany	In the process of accreditation	N/A	N/A	P1 & P5
European School, Lisbon	Portugal	Pending accreditation	N/A	N/A	N/A
International School Anne Beffort, Mersch	Luxembourg	In the process of accreditation	N/A	N/A	S1
Accredited European School Luxembourg-City	Luxembourg	Pending accreditation	N/A	N/A	N/A

== Former locations ==
School	Country	Date first accreditation agreement signed	Date first additional accreditation agreement signed	Accreditation lost
Europa School UK	United Kingdom	26 January 2015	9 March 2018	31 August 2021

== See also ==
- European Baccalaureate
- European School
- European Schools
