= American School of The Hague =

Location
- Wassenaar; Netherlands
- Coordinates: 52°8′46″N 4°25′20″E

Information
- Type: Private international school
- Motto: We build a better world as we become better human beings, hear and value every voice, keep every promise, and celebrate every achievement.
- Established: 1953
- Director: Dr. Courtney Lowe
- Faculty: approx. 200
- Grades: Pre-kindergarten to grade 12
- Enrollment: approx. 1,220
- Campuses: 2 (main and ECC)
- Colors: Gold and royal blue
- Athletics: Baseball, basketball, cross-country, swimming, softball, tennis, track and field, and volleyball
- Mascot: Trojans
- Arts: Theater, photography, visual arts, and music
- Website: www.ash.nl

The American School of The Hague is an international school located in Wassenaar, Netherlands. Student enrollment age ranges from 3 to 18 years. It represents students from 80 countries, with 28% and 15% being American and Dutch nationals.

== Overview ==
ASH was founded in 1953. Its purpose was to provide an American style education to children of international cooperation and government employees. The board of trustees are elected by the parents and are responsible for the governance of ASH. The school is accredited by NEASC - New England Association of Schools and Colleges. The school has three divisions: an elementary school, middle school and high school. In 1989, a new campus was built, next to the Rijksstraatweg in Wassenaar which was opened by then-Queen Beatrix of the Netherlands and First Lady Barbara Bush. Instruction is in English. French, Spanish, Dutch, and German are taught as foreign languages. There is no religious instruction.
