= Henry Brett (polo player) =

British champion polo player

Henry Brett (born 20 October 1974) is a British champion polo player.

== Biography ==
Brett attended the Dragon School and the European School, Culham, but left school at age of 16 to start his career as a polo player.

Since then, he has played for and captained the England polo team and has won every major tournament in England and many more around the world. He has reached a handicap of 8 and is one of only four English players to have reached this level since the Second World War. Currently, he has a handicap of 7 in Argentina. He was the first English player to captain his side to victory against Argentina in Argentina.

Henry co-founded The Polo Agency, a full-service brand sponsorship agency linked to the sport of polo.
