= Mainor =

Mainor is a surname. Notable people with the surname include:

- Charles Mainor (born 1967), American politician
- Kenny Mainor (born 1985), Canadian football player
