= EUROfusion =

European Union research consortium

- Founded: 2014; 12 years ago
- Headquarters: Garching, Germany
- Website: euro-fusion.org

EUROfusion is a consortium of national fusion research institutes located in the European Union, the UK, Switzerland and Ukraine. It was established in 2014 to succeed the European Fusion Development Agreement (EFDA) as the umbrella organisation of Europe's fusion research laboratories. The consortium is currently funded by the Euratom Horizon 2020 programme.

== Organisation ==
The EUROfusion consortium agreement has been signed by 30 research organisations and universities from 25 European Union countries plus Switzerland, Ukraine and the United Kingdom.

Country	Participating Laboratory
Austria	Austrian Academy of Sciences, Vienna
Belgium	Ecole Royale Militaire-Koninklijke Militaire School, Plasma Physics Laboratory, Brussels
Bulgaria	Bulgarian Academy of Sciences, Institute of Nuclear Research and Nuclear Energy, Sofia
Croatia	Ruđer Bošković Institute, Zagreb
Cyprus	University of Cyprus, Nicosia
Czech Republic	Academy of Sciences of the Czech Republic, Institute of Plasma Physics, Prague
Denmark	DTU, Plasma Physics and Fusion Energy, Lyngby
Estonia	University of Tartu, Institute of Physics
Finland	VTT Technical Research Centre of Finland, Espoo
France	Commissariat à l'énergie atomique et aux énergies alternatives, CEA, Cadarache
Germany	Forschungszentrum Jülich, FZJ; Karlsruhe Institute of Technology, KIT; Max Planck Institute of Plasma Physics, IPP, Garching and Greifswald
Greece	National Center For Scientific Research "DEMOKRITOS", Athens
Hungary	Hungarian Academy of Science, Wigner Research Centre for Physics, Budapest
Ireland	Dublin City University, Plasma Research Laboratory
Italy	Agenzia nazionale per le nuove tecnologie, l’energia e lo sviluppo economico sostenibile, ENEA (Italy), Frascati
Latvia	University of Latvia, Institute of Solid State Physics, Riga
Lithuania	Lithuanian Energy Institute, Kaunas
The Netherlands	Dutch Institute for Fundamental Energy Research (DIFFER), Eindhoven
Poland	Institute of Plasma Physics and Laser Microfusion, Warsaw
Portugal	Universidade de Lisboa, Instituto Superior Técnico, IPFN
Romania	Institutul de Fizica Atomica (IFA), Illfov
Slovakia	Comenius University, Department of Experimental Physics, Bratislava
Slovenia	JSI Jozef Stefan Institute, Ljubljana
Spain	Centro de Investigaciones Energeticas, Medioambientales y Tecnologicas, (CIEMAT), Madrid
Sweden	Vetenskapsrådet, Stockholm
Switzerland	Swiss Plasma Center (SPC), École polytechnique fédérale de Lausanne (EPFL), Lausanne
Ukraine	Kharkiv Institute of Physics and Technology (KIPT), Kharkiv
United Kingdom	Culham Centre for Fusion Energy (CCFE), Host to JET

The EUROfusion's Programme Management Unit offices located in Garching, near Munich (Germany), are hosted by the Max Planck Institute of Plasma Physics (IPP). The IPP is also the seat for the co-ordinator of EUROfusion.

== Activities ==
EUROfusion funds fusion research activities in accordance with the Roadmap to the realisation of fusion energy. The Roadmap outlines the most efficient way to realise fusion electricity by 2050. Research carried out under the EUROfusion umbrella aims to prepare for ITER experiments and develop concepts for the fusion power demonstration plant DEMO. EUROfusion is in charge of the fusion-related research carried out at JET, the Joint European Torus, which is housed in the Culham Centre for Fusion Energy, UK. Other fusion devices in Europe that devote some amount of time towards research under the EUROfusion framework include the following:

Device	Device type	Institute/Location
ASDEX Upgrade	Tokamak	IPP Garching, Germany
TCV Tokamak	Tokamak	École polytechnique fédérale de Lausanne, Switzerland
WEST	Tokamak	CEA, France
MAST Upgrade	Spherical tokamak	CCFE, United Kingdom
Wendelstein 7-X stellarator	Stellarator	IPP at the Greifswald branch
TJ-II stellarator	Stellarator	Laboratorio Nacional de Fusión, CIEMAT, Spain
Plasma-Wall Interaction in Linear Plasma Devices, PSI-2	Linear devices	FZJ, Jülich, Germany
PILOT-PSI	Linear devices	DIFFER, The Netherlands
MAGNUM-PSI	Linear devices	DIFFER, The Netherlands

== See also ==
- List of plasma physics software
