= Ülemiste =

Subdistrict of Tallinn, Estonia

Coordinates: 59.426635°N 24.813266°E

- Subdistrict of Tallinn
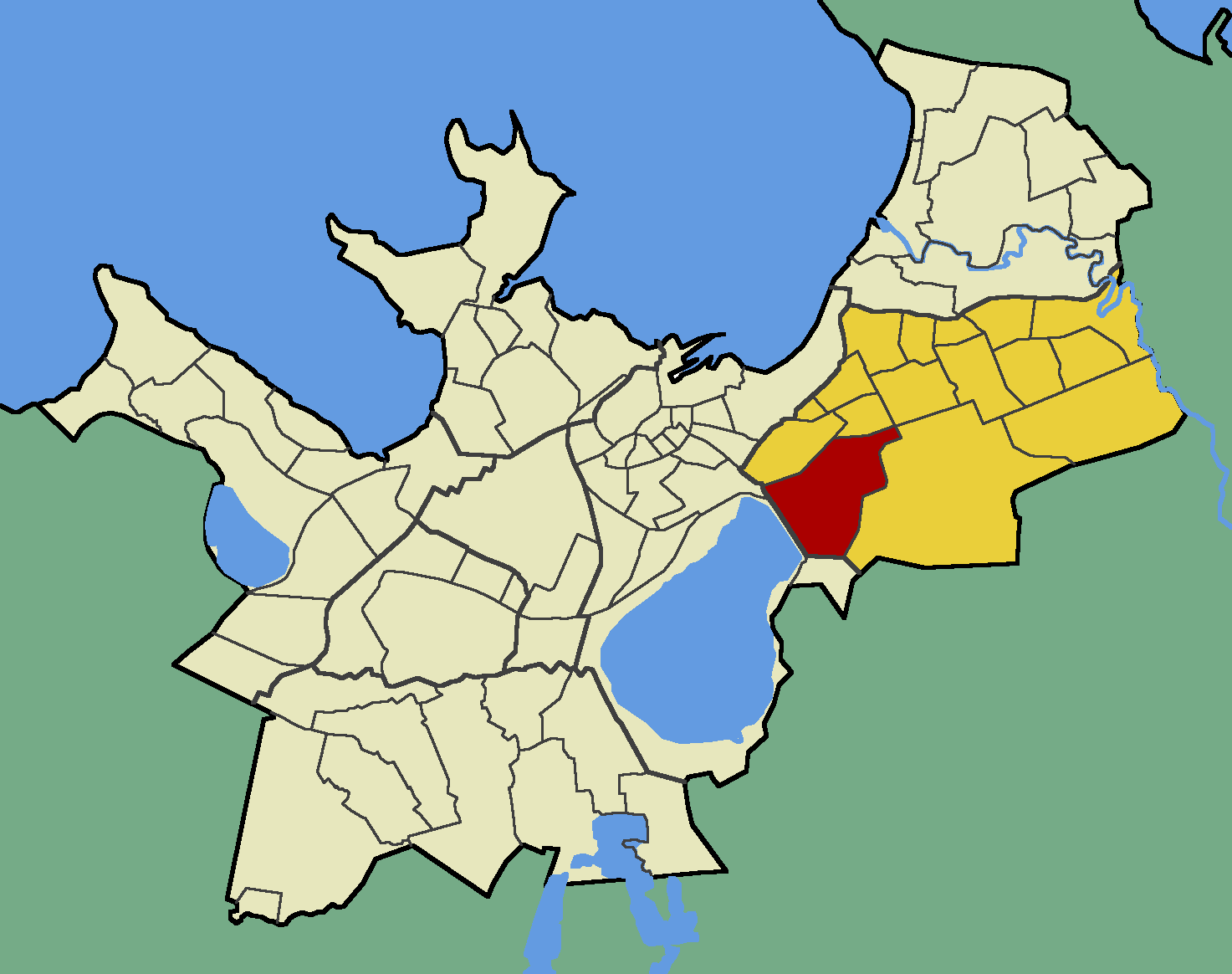
- Ülemiste within Lasnamäe District.
- Country: Estonia
- County: Harju County
- City: Tallinn
- District: Lasnamäe

Population (01.01.2015)
  - Total: 1,444

Ülemiste is a subdistrict (Estonian: asum) in the district of Lasnamäe, Tallinn, the capital of Estonia. It has a population of 1,444 (As of 1 January 2015).

Estonia's largest airport Lennart Meri Tallinn Airport is located in Ülemiste.

Ülemiste is the location of the Ülemiste Keskus shopping mall and the Ülemiste City business park.

Ülemiste railway station will be the location of Rail Baltica's Tallinn terminal, which is planned to open in 2030.

== Gallery ==
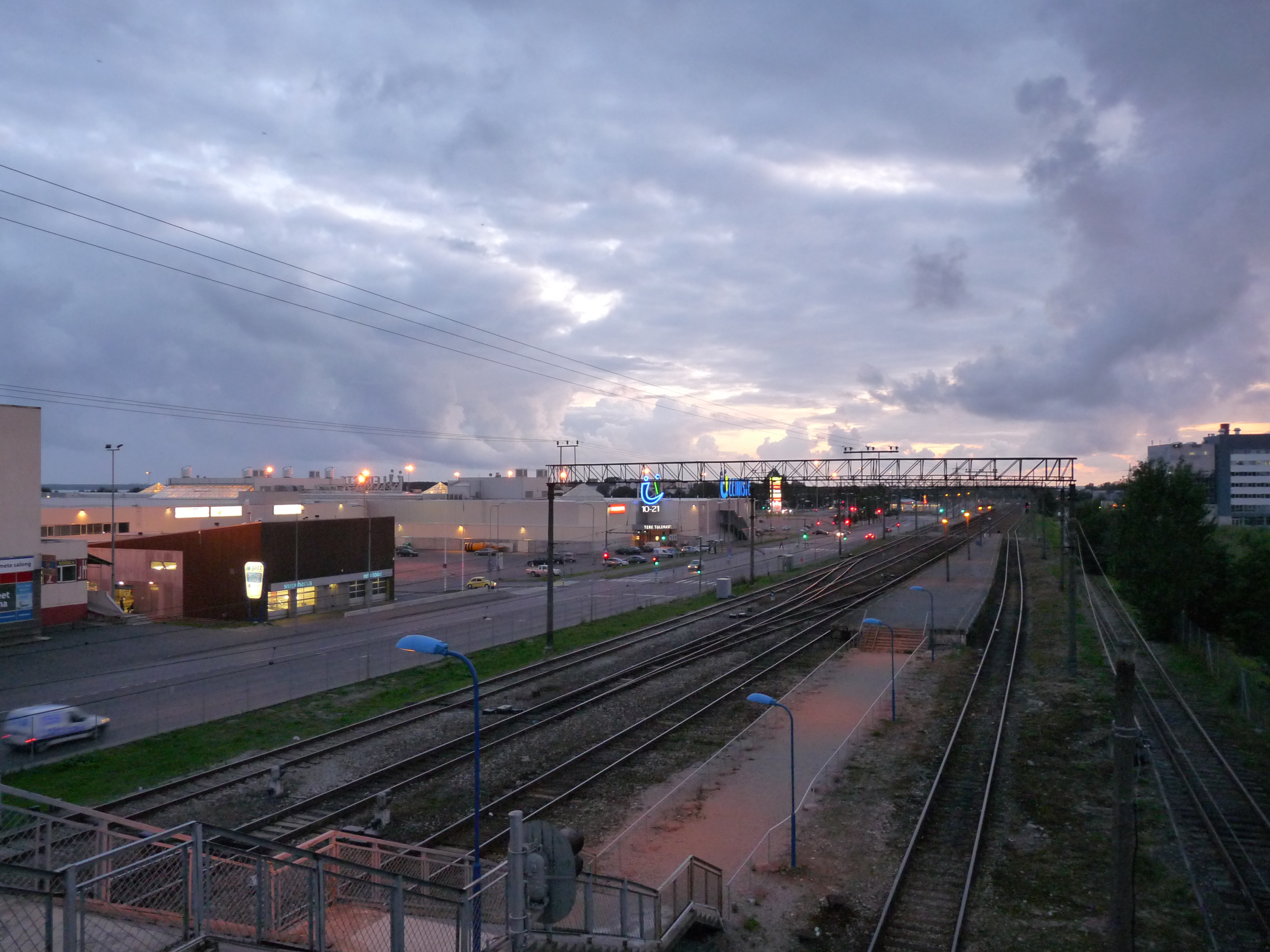
Ülemiste train station before the rebuild in 2012

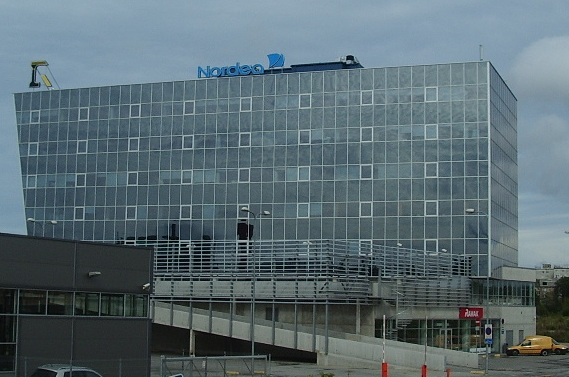
Nordea

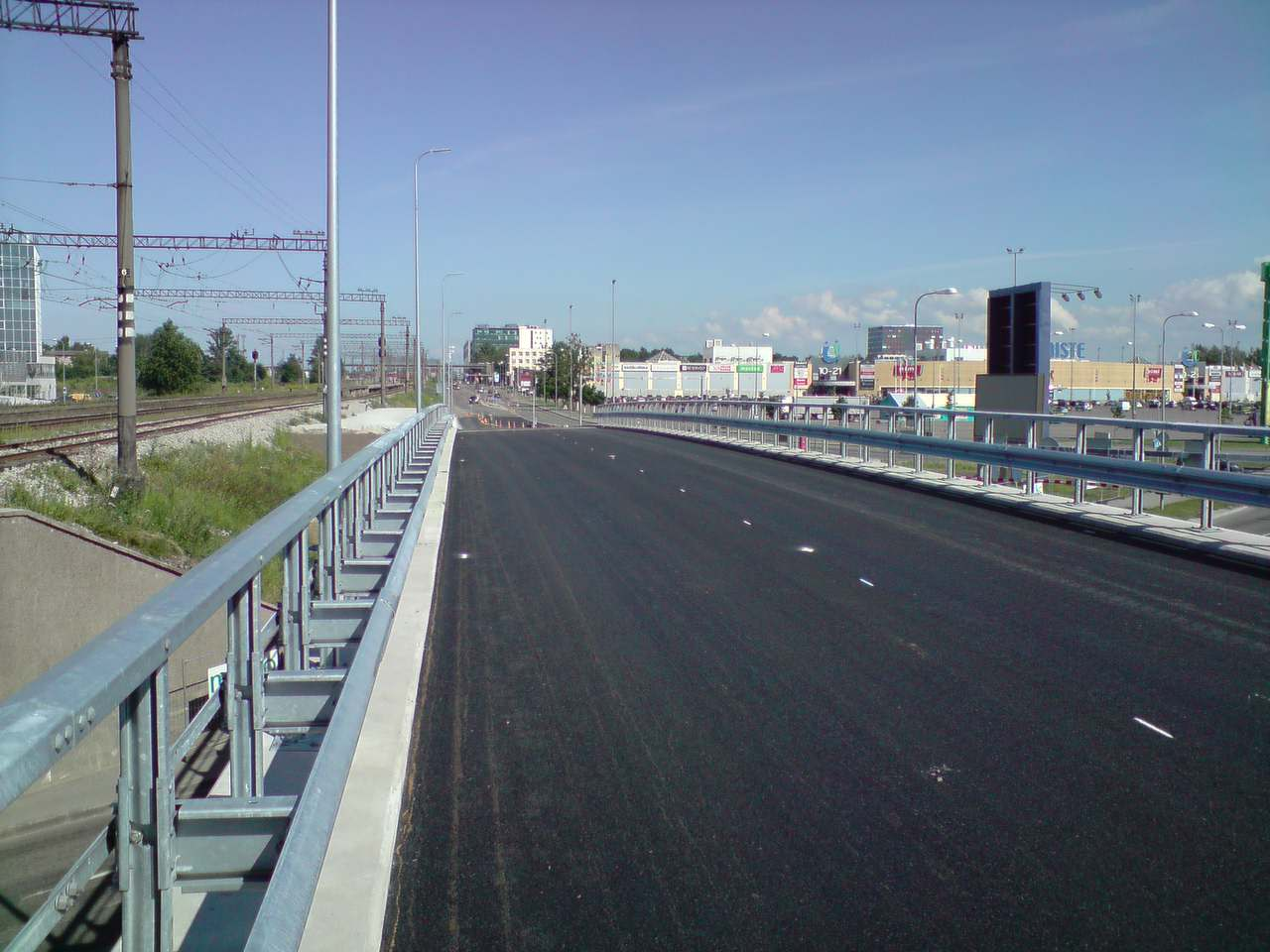
Bridge between Suur-Sõjamäe and Järvevana

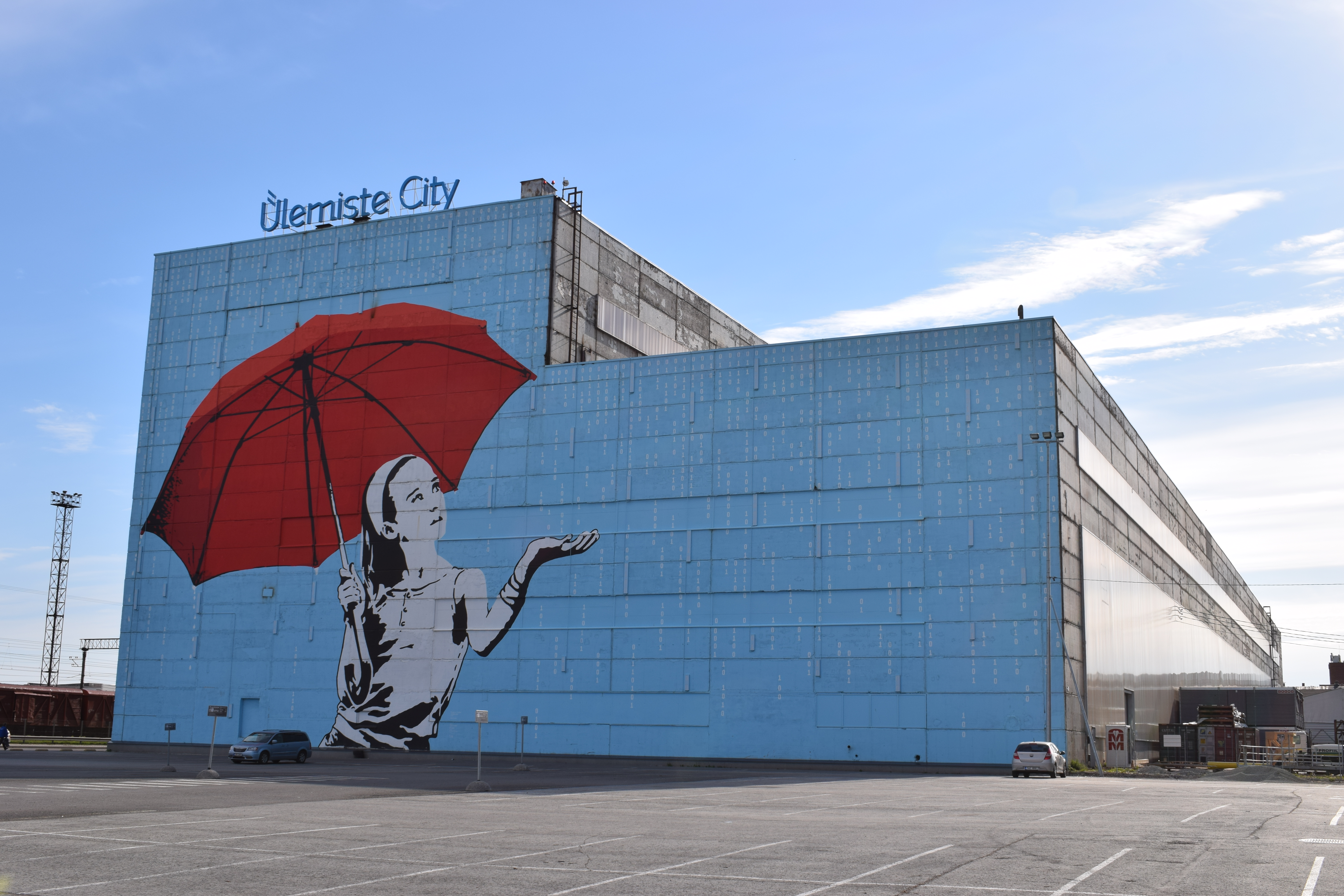
Ülemiste City

== See also ==
- Ülemiste City
- Ülemiste Tunnel
