= European School The Hague =

- Europese School Den Haag

Location
- Oostduinlaan 50; The Hague, 2596 JP; The Netherlands
- Coordinates: 52.097321°N 4.310840°E

Information
- Other name: ESH
- Established: August 2012
- School board: Rijnlands Lyceum Foundation
- Director: Frans van de Kerkhof
- Gender: Mixed
- Age range: 4 to 18
- Enrolment: 1,325 (2018-2019)
  - Nursery: 256
  - Primary: 648
  - Secondary: 512
- Accreditation: Accredited by the European Schools
- Website: europeanschoolthehague.nl/

The European School The Hague (Dutch: Europese School Den Haag), or ESH is an Accredited European School offering nursery, primary and secondary education in 13 European languages, leading to the European Baccalaureate.

== Curriculum ==
Students at the European School The Hague must enrol in a language section, with general instruction provided in the language of the respective section. The primary school currently operates Dutch, English, French, German and Spanish language sections, and the Secondary school offers Dutch, English and French language sections, with German beginning in school year 2020–2021. Students must choose from either English, French or Dutch for their second language, which becomes the language of instruction for the History, Geography and Ethics curriculum from the third-year secondary.

As per the policy of the European Schools, students whose mother tongue is not covered by a language section, must enrol in the section of one of the EU's official vehicular languages (English, German, or French), or in the section of the host country language (Dutch). They may then opt for their mother tongue for "Language 1" classes in place of those usually provided by their respective chosen language section. For the purposes of second language classes, their respective chosen section then becomes their designated second language.

In 2006 the Council of the European Union and European Parliament adopted a European Framework for Key Competences for Lifelong Learning. These competences are incorporated and embedded in the European Schools curriculum. The eight key competences, which all individuals need for personal fulfillment and development, active citizenship, social inclusion and employment form the basis of the school's curriculum.

== Legal status ==
The school received its initial status as an Accredited European School from the Board of Governors of the European Schools in November 2013, and received accreditation to offer the European Baccalaureate programme in June 2018.

The European School The Hague is managed by the Rijnlands Lyceum Foundation, which is responsible for the provision and maintenance of its facilities, finances, staff, and the overall quality of education.

The school was largely established to cater for the needs of families of staff of European institutions based in The Hague. For this reason the school is obliged to prioritise, for enrolment purposes, the children of staff of European Union institutions or agencies (notably Europol and Eurojust), as well as non-EU institutions such as the European Patent Office and the European Space Agency (ESA/ESTEC). The European Commission covers the fees of children of European Union staff enrolled in the school.

== History ==
The European School The Hague opened in August 2012, and was officially inaugurated that October, with an event programme that included a key note speech on "The Future of Europe", delivered by Rob de Wijk, Professor of International Relations and Security at the Institute of Security and Global Affairs at Leiden University. Initially only the nursery and primary cycles of the school operated, with the secondary cycle operating from September 2014.

In 2018, the secondary school moved into the old Aloysius College premises, a municipal monument, and has undertaken a significant renovation project to modernise the facilities, while maintaining the historical integrity of the building. The renovation project will deliver a new theatre, library, art, science and IT facilities, 27 new classrooms, and new kitchen and canteen facilities during school year 2020–2021. New sports facilities, additional classrooms and office space will be available when the renovations end in the school year 2021–2022.

ESH held its first European Baccalaureate examinations in 2019.

== See also ==
- Accredited European School
- European Baccalaureate
- European Schools
