= Dvigatel =

Company based in Estonia

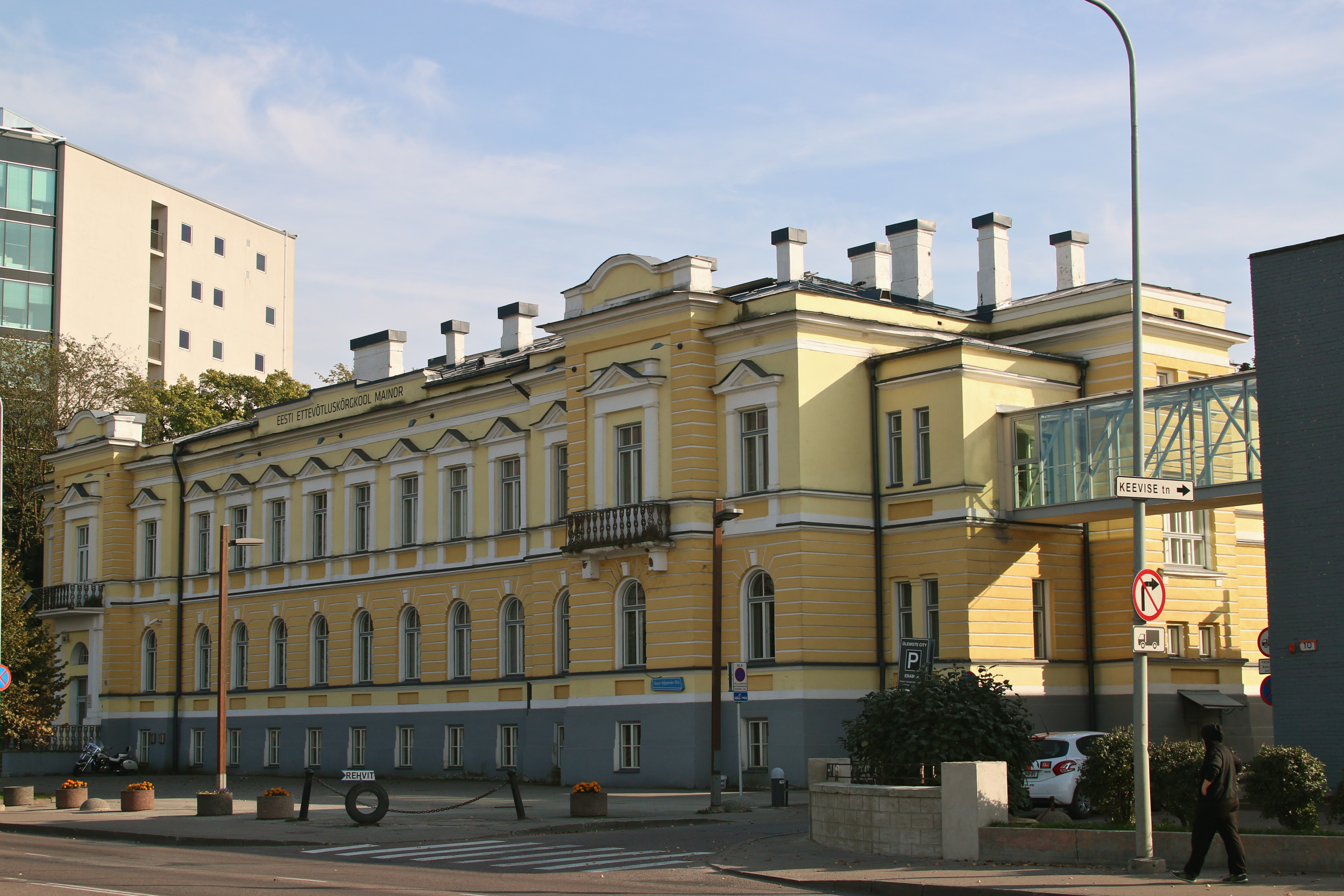
Administrative building of Dvigatel

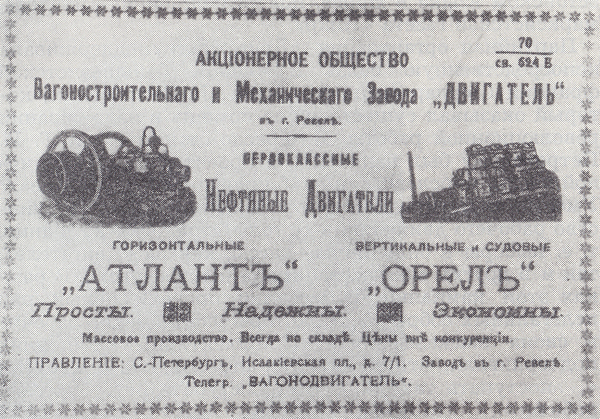
Advertisements of Dvigatel (1911)

Dvigatel was a metal industry company located in Lasnamäe, Tallinn, Estonia. Dvigatel existed 1897–2007. Its headquarters were located in Tallinn and Sankt Peterburg. Infrastructure of Dvigatel is partly preserved nowadays and is situated in Industry park of Dvigatel (:et)

Dvigatel was established in 1897 after czar Nikolai II signed the statute of company "Dvigatel". At the beginning it produced railway wagons.

After World War II there were produced reactors and different devices. The building In the period 1979-1983, the Dvigateli metal production building was built, during the Estonian SSR, the secret metal industry of the Dvigateli military factory was located there, the building had no windows facing the airport to ensure the secrecy of the operation.

== Names ==
- ...
- 1970s-1980s National Factory named after Vladimir Lenin (Estonian: V. I. Lenini nimeline Riiklik Liidutehas)
- 1992-1995 RAS Dvigatel (national joint-stock company)
- 1996-2007 AS Dvigatel (joint-stock company)
