= Culham =

Village in Oxfordshire, England

Coordinates: 51.652°N 1.266°W

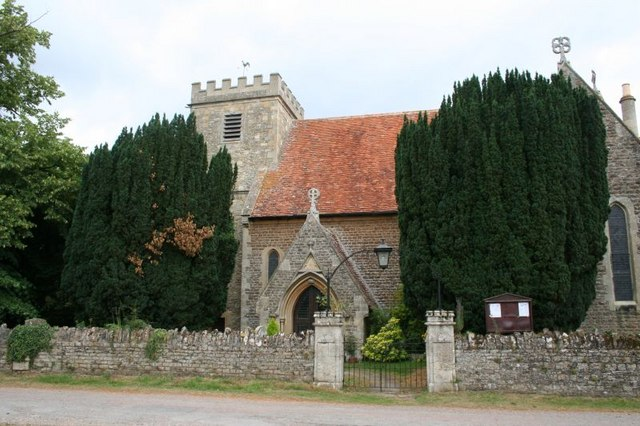
- St Paul's parish church

- Location within Oxfordshire
- Area: 8.29 km^{2} (3.20 sq mi)
- Population: 453 (2011 census)
  - Density: 55/km^{2} (140/sq mi)
- OS grid reference: SU5095
- Civil parish: Culham
- District: South Oxfordshire
- Shire county: Oxfordshire
- Region: South East
- Country: England
- Sovereign state: United Kingdom
- Post town: Abingdon
- Postcode district: OX14
- Dialling code: 01235
- Police: Thames Valley
- Fire: Oxfordshire
- Ambulance: South Central
- UK Parliament: Didcot and Wantage
- Website: Culham Village, Oxfordshire

Culham is a village and civil parish in a bend of the River Thames, 1 mile (1.6 km) south of Abingdon in Oxfordshire. The parish is bounded by the Thames to the north, west and south, and by present and former field boundaries to the east. It is low-lying and fairly flat, rising from the Thames floodplain in the south to a north-facing escarpment in the north up to 260 feet (80 m) above sea level. The 2011 census recorded its population as 453.

The parish includes Culham Science Centre, a major centre for nuclear fusion research occupying the former site of RNAS Culham.

== History ==
=== Manor ===
The toponym comes from the Old English Cula's hamm, referring to the village's position in a bend of the Thames. Culham is known to have existed by the reign of King Coenwulf of Mercia early in the 9th century, by which time the manor belonged to Abingdon Abbey. Soon after the Norman Conquest of England part of the manor was seized by William the Conqueror, but the land was restored to the abbey and remained in its possession until the dissolution of the monasteries in 1538.

The west wing of Culham Manor was built in the 15th century as a medieval grange for Abingdon Abbey. It is half-timbered, with a stone ground floor and timber-framed first floor. In 1610 it was extended with a new north front and east wing. The east wing was later demolished but the 17th-century north front survives. The house is a Grade II* Listed building. In 1685 a dovecote was built for the manor house. It, too, is now Grade II* listed. North of the house is a 17th-century sundial mounted on a 13th-century column.

=== Parish church ===
Several records suggest that Culham may have had a chapel since the 9th century. A parish church dedicated to Saint Paul was built in the 12th century. It was cruciform, having a chancel, nave and north and south transepts, and had features from the Early English and Decorated periods. There was a tower, and this was demolished and replaced in 1710. In 1852 the whole church except the 1710 tower was demolished and replaced with a new Gothic Revival building in 13th century style designed by Joseph Clarke.

During the rebuilding, heraldic stained glass installed in the north transept in 1638 was transferred to a window in the north aisle of the new church. The tower has a ring of six bells, but currently for technical reasons it is not possible to ring them. Mears and Stainbank of the Whitechapel Bell Foundry cast or re-cast five of the bells in 1921, and cast the present tenor bell in 1926. St Paul's also has a Sanctus bell cast in 1774 by Edne Witts of Aldbourne, Wiltshire. St Paul's parish is now part of the Benefice of Dorchester.

In 1486 brothers Sir Humphrey and Thomas Stafford sought sanctuary in the church after they had fled from the newly crowned King Henry VII after the brothers were defeated at the Battle of Bosworth. On 14 May 1486, sixty of the King's men entered the church and arrested the two brothers who were tried for treason. Sir Humphrey Stafford was executed; however, Henry pardoned the younger brother Thomas.

The mid-18th-century Georgian former rectory, Culham House, which was probably designed and built by John Phillips of London, is a Grade II listed building.

=== Economic and social development ===
Culham Inclosure Act 1810
- Act of Parliament
- Parliament of the United Kingdom
- Long title: An Act for inclosing Lands within the Manor and Parish of Culham, in the County of Oxford.
- Citation: 50 Geo. 3. c. cxl

Dates
- Royal assent: 24 May 1810

Text of statute as originally enacted

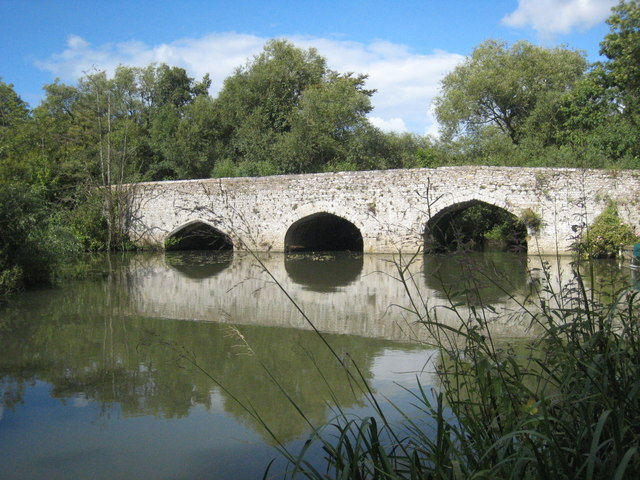
Culham Old Bridge

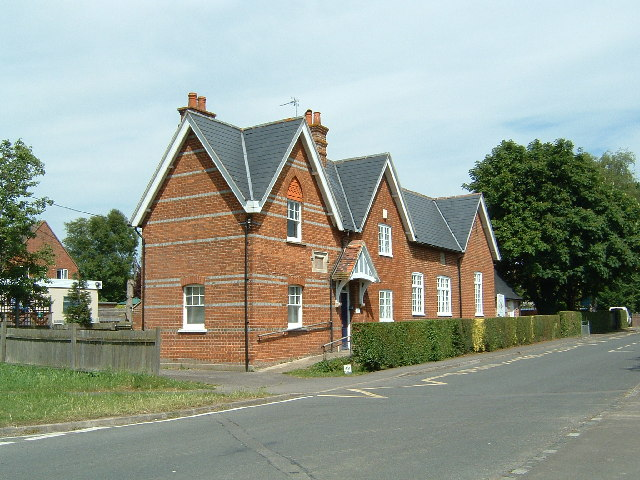
Culham C of E primary school

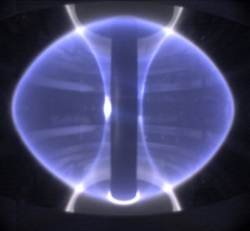
Plasma image from the MAST spherical tokamak machine at the Culham Centre for Fusion Energy

In 1416–22 the Abingdon Guild of the Holy Cross built Culham Bridge over the narrow Back Water between the village and Abingdon to carry the main road between Abingdon and Dorchester.

In the English Civil War, Royalist forces encamped on Culham Hill until June 1643, defending Culham Bridge. In May 1644 the Royalists withdrew from Abingdon and Parliamentarian forces took the bridge, from which they were able to intercept supplies to the Royalist headquarters in Oxford. In January 1645 a Royalist force tried to recapture the bridge and destroy it. The skirmish, known as the Battle of Culham Bridge, ended in a Parliamentarian victory and the Royalist commander Sir Henry Gage was mortally wounded.

In 1736 the Parliament passed the Berkshire and Oxfordshire Roads Act 1735 (9 Geo. 2. c. 14), the first of several acts to turn the Abingdon Road into a turnpike. It ceased to be a turnpike in the 1870s. In 1922 the Ministry of Transport classified it as the A415 road. In 1928 Oxfordshire County Council built a new bridge for the A415 beside the 15th-century one. The old bridge is now a Grade II* listed building. Road traffic between Culham and Sutton Courtenay crossed the Thames via Culham Ferry until 1807, when Sutton Bridge was built. In 1809 the Thames Navigation Commissioners built the 3/4 mile (1.2 km) long Culham Cut, a navigation that bypasses a difficult stretch of river past a watermill at Sutton Courtenay. Sutton Bridge was extended to span the cut, and Culham Lock was built on the cut just above the bridge. In 1844 the Great Western Railway opened an extension from Didcot to Oxford, passing through the eastern part of the parish. The GWR opened a station on the main road named Culham railway station, although it is 1 1/2 miles (2.4 km) east of the village, slightly nearer to Clifton Hampden. Isambard Kingdom Brunel designed the station building, and it has recently been restored by Network Rail. It is served by Great Western Railway.

In 1795 Culham had at least three public houses: the Nag's Head, the Sow and Pigs (later called the White Lion, but closed in 2009) and the Waggon and Horses (closed in 2015). In 1846 the Railway Hotel was added next to Culham railway station 1 mile (1.6 km) east of the village, and in 1894 a parish boundary change transferred the Nag's Head to Abingdon.

Most of the parish was farmed in an open field system until Parliament passed an inclosure act, the Culham Inclosure Act 1810 (50 Geo. 3. c. cxl).

The village school was built in 1850 and reorganised as an infants' school in 1924. Oxfordshire's smallest primary school, it shares a headteacher with nearby Clifton Hampden CE Primary School and is threatened with closure.

In the late 19th or early 20th century Culham had a brickworks.

=== Culham College ===
In 1851 Samuel Wilberforce, Bishop of Oxford founded the Diocesan Training College for Schoolmasters (Culham College). The Grade II listed building was designed by Joseph Clarke and completed in 1852. The building was altered and extended in about 1960. The college closed in 1979, and was converted into the Culham Trust, which established the Culham Institute as a charitable research organisation associated with the Church of England housed in the Educational Studies Department of Oxford University; the Culham Trust merged with the St Gabriel's Trust in 2012 to create the new Culham St Gabriel's Trust. The college's former buildings were occupied by the European School, Culham from 1978 until its closure in 2017, at which point the site became part of the Europa School UK.

=== Airfield and research centre ===
In 1941 the Fleet Air Arm opened Royal Naval Air Station HMS Hornbill between Culham railway station and Clifton Hampden village. Most of the airfield is in Clifton Hampden parish, but HMS Hornbill was also called RNAS Culham. A Royal Observer Corps Post was also constructed, in a field east of Tollgate Road, adjacent to a pre existent Pillbox, just up the hill from the rifle range, next to the river. The Admiralty closed the airfield in 1956 and transferred it to the UK Atomic Energy Authority in 1960. The former airfield is now the Culham Science Centre, an 800,000 square metre scientific research site that most notably includes two major nuclear fusion experiments: JET and MAST. The START Nuclear Fusion Experiment was also conducted on the site until MAST succeeded it in 1999.

== See also ==
- Crossings of the River Thames
- Locks on the River Thames

== Sources ==
- Dodsworth, IC (1976). "The Chawley Brick and Tile Works, Cumnor". Oxoniensia. XLI. Oxfordshire Architectural and Historical Society: 348–353. ISSN 0308-5562.
- Lobel, Mary D, ed. (1962). A History of the County of Oxford. Victoria County History. Vol. 7: Thame and Dorchester Hundreds. London: Oxford University Press for the Institute of Historical Research. pp. 27–39.
- Sherwood, Jennifer; Pevsner, Nikolaus (1974). Oxfordshire. The Buildings of England. Harmondsworth: Penguin Books. pp. 565–567. ISBN 0-14-071045-0.
