= List of secondary schools in Luxembourg =

This is a list of secondary schools in Luxembourg.

Name	Acronym	Location	Type
Athenée de Luxembourg	AL	Luxembourg City	public
European School, Luxembourg I	ESL1	Luxembourg City (Kirchberg)	European School
European School, Luxembourg II	ESL2	Bertrange	European School
International School of Luxembourg	ISL	Luxembourg City (Hollerich)	European School
Lycée Aline Mayrisch	LAML	Luxembourg City (Hollerich)	public
Lycée de Garçons de Luxembourg	LGL	Luxembourg City (Limpertsberg)	public
Lycée de Garçons Esch-sur-Alzette	LGE	Esch-sur-Alzette	public
Lycée Hubert Clément	LHCE	Esch-sur-Alzette	public
Lycée Josy Barthel	LJBM	Mamer	public
Lycée Michel Lucius	LML	Luxembourg City (Limpertsberg)	public
Lycée Michel Rodange	LMRL	Luxembourg City (Hollerich)	public
Lycée Vauban		Luxembourg City (Gasperich)	public
Atert Lycée Redange	ALR	Redange-sur-Attert	public
École de commerce et de gestion	ECG		public
École nationale pour adultes	ENAD		public
Lycée des Arts et Métiers	LAM		public
Lycée Robert Schuman	LRSL		public
Lycée technique de Bonnevoie	LTB	Luxembourg City (Bonnevoie)	public
Lycée technique du Centre	LTC		public
Lycée technique pour professions de santé	LTPS		public
École internationale de Differdange et d'Esch-sur-Alzette	EIDE		international
Lycée Bel-Val	LBV		public
Lycée Guillaume Kroll	LGK		public
Lycée Mathias Adam	LYMA		public
Lycée Nic Biever	LNB		public
Lycée technique de Lallange	LTL		public
École internationale de Mondorf-les-Bains	EIMLB		international
Lycée Classique d'Echternach	LCE		public
Lënster Lycée International School	LLIS		international
Maacher Lycée	MLG		public
Schengen-Lyzeum Perl	SLP		public
Sportslycée	SLL		public
École internationale Mersch Anne Beffort	EIMAB		international
École d'Hôtellerie et de Tourisme du Luxembourg	EHTL		public
Lycée Classique de Diekirch	LCD		public
Lycée Edward Steichen Clervaux	LESC		public
Lycée Ermesinde	LEM		public
Lycée du Nord	LN		public
Lycée technique agricole	LTA		public
Lycée technique d'Ettelbruck	LTEtt		public
Lycée technique pour professions éducatives et sociales	LTPES		public
Nordstad-Lycée	NOSL		public
OTR International School	OTR	Belair, Luxembourg City	private international
École privée Fieldgen	EPF	Luxembourg City	private
École privée Marie-Consolatrice	EPMC		private
École privée Notre Dame	EPND		private
École privée Sainte-Anne	EPSA		private
Lycée privé Emile Metz	LPEM		private
