= Education in Luxembourg =

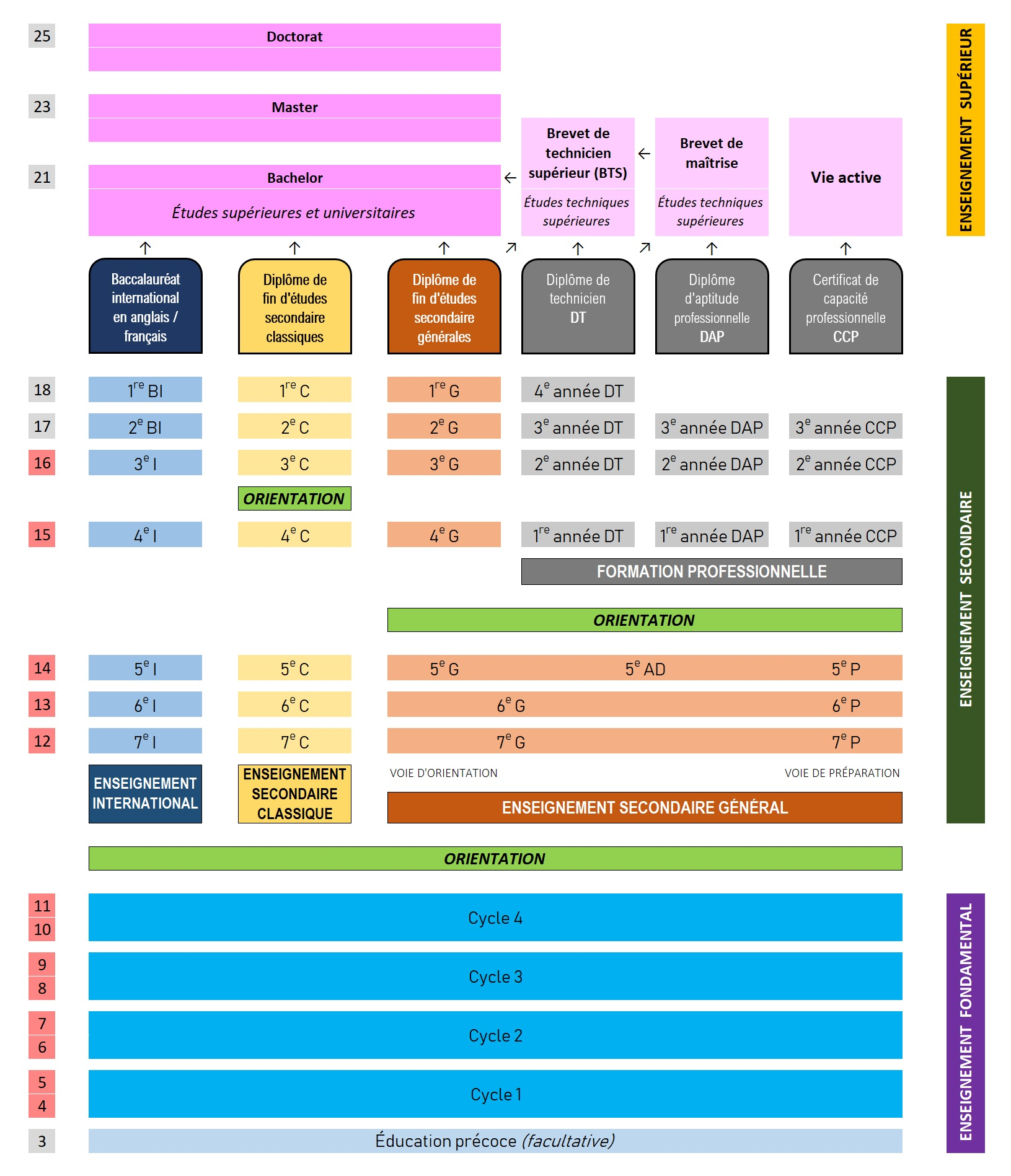
The guide to the Education system in Luxembourg, written in French.

Education in Luxembourg is multilingual and consists of fundamental education, secondary education and higher education. It is overseen by the Ministry of National Education, Children and Youth. From an early age, students are introduced to Luxembourgish, French, and German languages. The system includes a fundamental education that spans from ages 4 to 11, followed by secondary education, which is divided into classical and general streams based on students' academic performance and career interests.

== Fundamental education ==
Fundamental education (enseignement fondamental) consists of preschool and primary school. It is obligatory from the age of 4 onwards and is composed of 4 cycles instead of school years:

- 1st cycle: children aged 3–5 (at the beginning of the year)
- 2nd cycle: ages 6–7
- 3rd cycle: ages 8–9
- 4th cycle: ages 10–11

This system was introduced in the law of 21 January 2009.

== Secondary education ==
Secondary education lasts 6–7 years, and consists of:

- Classical system (enseignement secondaire): Geared towards a university education. It offers a general, all-round education. The objective is for the students to acquire fundamental knowledge of human sciences, literature, mathematics and natural sciences
- Technical system (enseignement secondaire technique): Emphasis more on vocational education. It may, however, also allow access to university studies. It is divided into 4 régimes:
  - General régime (régime classique equivalent and allows access to university studies; replaced by the régime technique)
  - Technician training régime (50% theoretical and 50% practical; allows access to higher technical studies)
  - Professional régime resulting in a Certificate of technical and professional aptitude (CATP) (75% practical and 25% theoretical)
  - Preparatory régime, for those who have not yet fulfilled the requirements of fundamental education

Schools of secondary education (that is, aimed towards university education) are called Lycées (or, colloquially, Lycée classique), while schools of secondary technical education are Lycées techniques. Some Lycées offer both types of education. The oldest Lycée in the country is the Athénée de Luxembourg, established in 1603. For a long time, it was also the only secondary school.

32 public Lycées and 5 private Lycées teach the state curriculum. Out of these, the following 4 have a special status to use innovative teaching techniques, while still using the public curriculum:

- Lycée Ermesinde, an all-day school
- Schengen Lycée, a bi-national school in Perl, Germany
- Sportlycée, for pupils engaging in sport at a high level
- École de la 2e chance (School of the second chance), for adolescents or adults who have left the school system without a certification

== Higher education ==
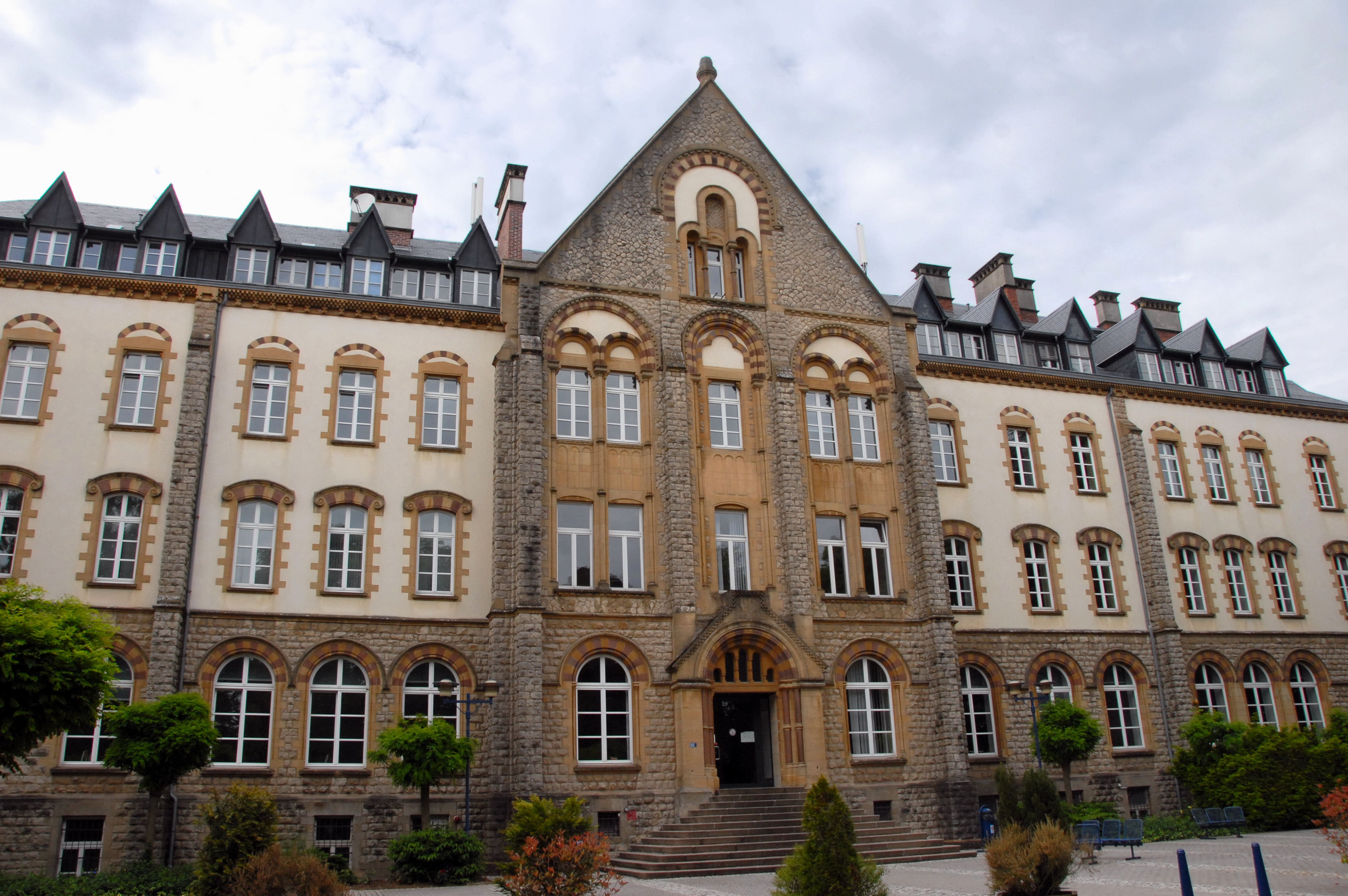
The University of Luxembourg's main building on the Limpertsberg campus

Higher education in Luxembourg is dominated by the University of Luxembourg, the only fully-fledged university in Luxembourg. It was founded in 2003 and has locations in Esch-sur-Alzette and Luxembourg City. Miami University Dolibois European Center is an international campus of Miami University (based in the United States), located in Differdange. Open University Luxembourg is a distance learning cooperation between the Luxembourg Lifelong Learning Center, the Luxembourg Chamber of Employees in the private sector, and the Open University (based in the United Kingdom), offering evening or distance learning courses. Luxembourg School of Business is the only accredited graduate business school in the nation.

Higher education is also offered by several lycées techniques, in the areas of business and management, arts, and healthcare. After three years of study, this leads to the award of a Brevet de technicien supérieur (BTS). Since 2013, the Lycée classique d'Echternach offers classes préparatoires for the French grandes écoles.

== Private and international schools ==
The vast majority of schools are state-run and free. However, some non-public schools exist. Some of these teach the same curriculum as state schools for the same diplomas, but charge tuition. Others teach foreign curricula and award foreign qualifications.

Among secondary schools, the following private schools teach the state curriculum and receive state subsidies:

- École privée Marie-Consolatrice
- École privée Sainte-Anne
- École privée Fieldgen
- Lycée Privé Émile Metz
- École privée Notre-Dame Sainte Sophie

Another five private schools teach a different curriculum, and receive fewer subsidies:

- Waldorf School (teaches towards the International Baccalaureate)
- St. George's International School (teaches the National Curriculum of England, Wales and Northern Ireland)
- International School of Luxembourg (teaches towards the International Baccalaureate)
- Lycée Vauban: Lycée francais du Luxembourg (teaches the French national curriculum)
- École privée Grandjean

The European schools are public schools, in the sense that they accept (for free) the children of European Union civil servants, and those whose parents work for other organisations with some special agreement. Other parents may also send their children, spaces permitting, but must pay tuition. They consist of European Schools I and II, and award the European Baccalaureate.

== Multilingualism ==
Tri-lingualism is a feature of the state education system, and of Luxembourgish society in general.

From pre-school onwards, Luxembourgish is spoken with the children. For the large number of foreign children in the country, this may be their first exposure to Luxembourgish. From the age of 6, children are taught to read and write German. The year after, French is introduced, while the language of instruction is German.

In secondary school, German is the vehicular language in the Lycées techniques, and in the lower years of the Lycées classiques. From the age of 15, however, French is used in Lycées classiques. English is added as a further obligatory language in all secondary schools. In Lycées classiques, pupils may optionally also choose to take lessons in Latin, Spanish or Italian. The number of hours per week devoted to language teaching at all levels of school is high, at 50% of teaching time.

Similarly, for the University of Luxembourg, one of its defining features is its "multi-lingual character": it uses English, French and German.

== History ==
The history of education in Luxembourg is closely linked to that of the Athénée de Luxembourg: in addition to being the oldest, and for a long time the only, secondary school in the country, it was also the home of Luxembourg's fledgling higher education courses for a while. It was founded as the Jesuit College (Collège des Jésuites) in Luxembourg city in 1603, and from this it derives its nickname "Kolleisch". When the Jesuit order was abolished by the Pope in 1773, it became a Royal College, staffed by the secular clergy instead of Jesuits. The French occupation from 1795 to 1814 put an end to its activities.

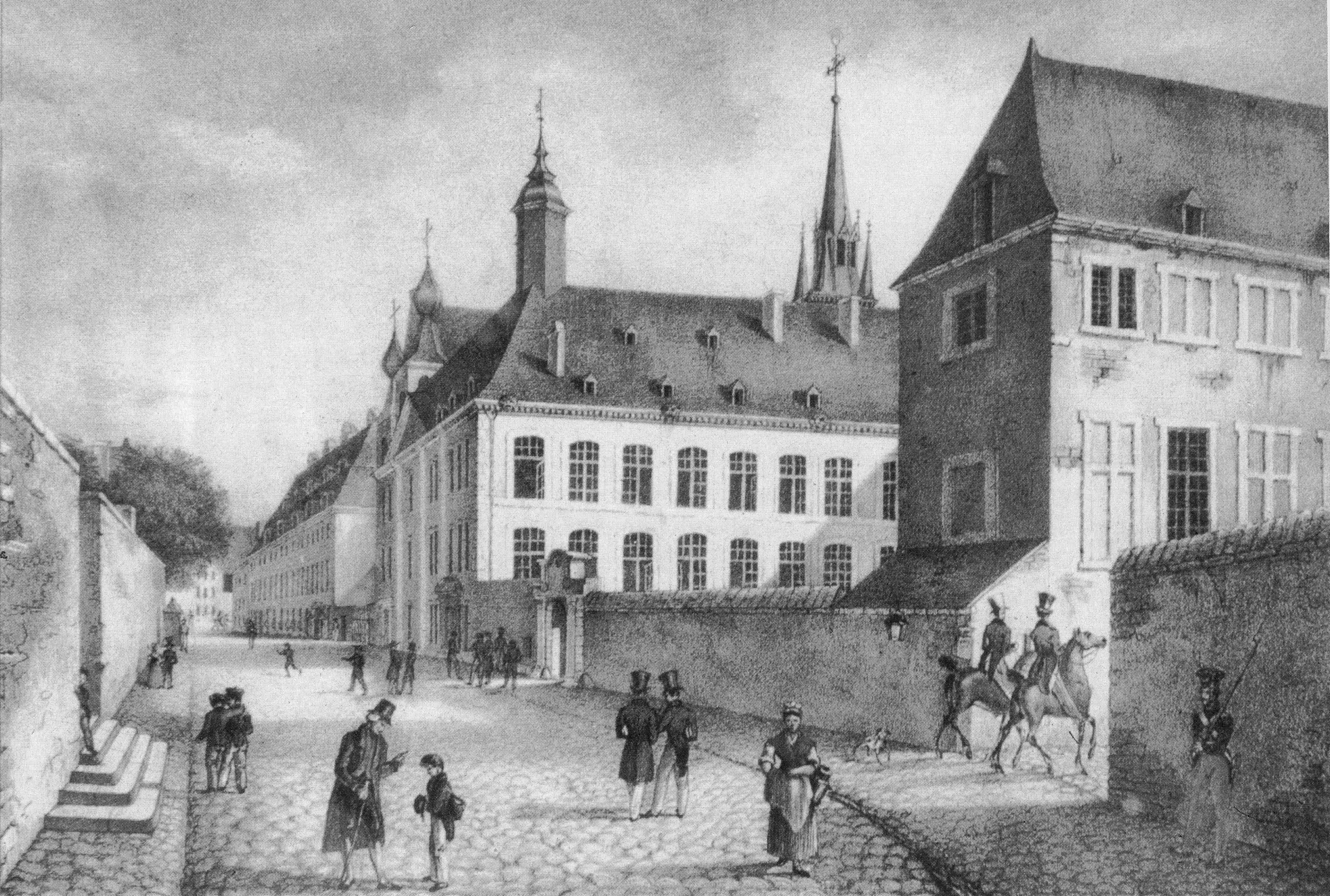
The old building of the Athénée de Luxembourg, 1828

An École centrale was created in its place from 1802, renamed an École Secondaire in 1805. It became a Collège communal in 1808, then a Gymnasium after Napoleon's defeat. It was renamed the Athénée Royal in 1817. That same year, the cours supérieurs (called cours académiques from 1824) were founded: these taught metaphysics, logic, physical sciences and mathematics, and were intended to compensate to an extent for the lack of a university in Luxembourg. Around the 1830s, the time of the Belgian Revolution, a distinction started to be made in the higher school years of the Athénée, between the "gymnasium," for those intending to attend university, and the "middle school" (école moyenne), later the industrial and commercial school, for everyone else.

=== Belgian Revolution ===
In 1830, most of Luxembourg (with the exception of the capital) sided with the Belgian Revolution against the Dutch King William I. The King-Grand Duke therefore sought to prevent young Luxembourgers from attending Belgian universities, which were hotbeds of anti-Dutch revolutionary sentiment. Belgian academic degrees were no longer recognised in Luxembourg from 1832, and an 1835 decree forced Luxembourgish students to study exclusively in the states of the German Confederation. This Germanisation policy continued with the Friedemann reform in 1837, which had the goal of turning the Athénée de Luxembourg into a preparatory school for German universities, and abolished the academic courses that had existed there since 1817, depriving Luxembourg of its embryo of higher education.

When the country became independent in 1839 (while remaining under personal union with the Dutch king), it needed its own administrative and political institutions: one major problem was the education of future elites, who would replace the foreign functionaries and play a key role in society. William I's measures of 1835 and 1837 had oriented the education system towards Germany, but the specific geographical nature of the country also required links with French-speaking countries. The professors of the Athénée demanded a reform of secondary education and the re-establishment of the academic courses.

William II came to the throne in 1840, ending his father's policies of reaction and Germanisation. The Constitution of 1841 allowed a free choice of universities, and laid the foundation for an education policy that took account of the specificities of the country. The coming reform was supported by the liberals, but opposed by the advocates of the Friedemann reform. While it was generally agreed that establishing a fully-fledged university in the Grand-Duchy was not viable, the question of how to organise higher education was a divisive one. As in other areas, the Luxembourgers examined the neighbouring countries's systems to determine the best course to follow. The clerical faction was in support of the German system, while the Belgian model had liberal support. This latter system entrusted university examinations to a jury of professors as well as learned and reputable men drawn from different parts of society, and this was the system eventually chosen by Luxembourg. It was clear that, far from just being a demonstration of academic knowledge, degrees were seen as a test of one's ability to exercise public office, and therefore it was only seen as fitting that they should be brought under tight state control. For the government, academic examinations were a matter of national sovereignty, which could not be entrusted to foreign universities. Automatically recognising foreign diplomas was out of the question.

The authorities decided, as a minimum, to re-establish the cours supérieurs at the Athénée, which were, however, just a pale imitation of higher education. The Luxembourgish state thereby gave itself the prerogative to confer academic degrees.

=== Organic law of 1848 ===
The system of academic degrees and the cours supérieurs was organised in the organic law of 23 July 1848: the Athénée would provide cours supérieurs, preparing for the degree of candidat (obtainable after only one year) in physical sciences and mathematics on the one hand, and in philosophy and letters on the other. Degrees were to be awarded by examination juries in Luxembourg. Qualifications obtained elsewhere were not recognised in the Grand Duchy. The law did, however, oblige students to take courses at foreign universities, the contents of which would be tested by Luxembourgish juries. The law of 1848 was continually adapted over the next half-century. These changes, accompanied by passionate debates, concerned the subject matter to be examined, the creation of new degrees for certain professions, and an adaptation to the realities of university education: there were cases where the state prescribed the attendance of courses that were no longer offered anywhere. From 1882, the need to reform secondary education set off an argument over the nature, and indeed the purpose, of the cours supérieurs. The Council of State was against abolishing them, as this would entail a reform of the law on academic awards. The debate was to flare up again in the early 20th century, but national sentiment prevailed: abandoning the cours supérieurs, and the end of awarding degrees, would mean abandoning a part of the Luxembourgish nation's independence.

=== Cours supérieurs and examination juries ===
Those graduating from the last year of gymnasium in the Athénée mostly went on to attend the cours supérieurs. The familiar atmosphere and the money saved were the reasons behind this, as well as the fact that these professors would be on the examination juries. Until 1884, the letters section was predominant, attended by students preparing for law, philology or theology. Towards the end of the century, interest in the science section increased, with young adults devoting themselves to the hard sciences, pharmaceutics, and industrial studies.

==== Criticism ====
The controversy over the cours supérieurs was partly due to their confusing nature. Accessible after an entrance exam, they took place in the building of the Athénée, a secondary school, and led to the award of certain degrees. But it was unclear whether these were an extension of secondary education, or the early stage of higher education. Even legislators and legal experts of the day had no definitive answer. They were described in 1882 by the Athénée's director as a "hybrid institution" between secondary and tertiary education; twenty years later, the jury for pharmacy termed them a "mockery, a caricature of university courses." The courses' practical organisation was partly to blame. After 1848, the Athénée consisted of three establishments: the cours supérieurs, the gymnasium, and the industrial school. But this was only a nominal division: the science section of the cours supérieurs, for example, often consisted of lessons combined with the two highest years of the industrial school. There was barely a consensus on whether there was one or two cours supérieurs. The Chamber of Deputies debated this in 1892, and decided in the end that there was one set of cours supérieurs: the letters section of the cours supérieurs was taught by professors of the gymnasium, the science section by those of the industrial school. While many refused to admit it, these courses hardly fulfilled the requirements of university studies.

The professors' training was not necessarily of a higher standard. The degree of candidat was sufficient to teach until 1857, when a doctorate became a requirement for many teaching posts, and demanded by law from 1874. The professors' pay, on the other hand, did not increase. No special compensation was offered for those teaching cours supérieurs.

The failure rates in the exams by the Luxembourgish juries was relatively low in the beginning, but increased steadily to reach 50% in 1901-1902. Results did not improve over the next few years. Some contemporaries saw this as a result of inherent flaws in the Luxembourgish system: the exams did not take into account the subject matter taught in the universities, and the examiners themselves were not up to speed with the latest research. The composition of the exam juries was problematic: without a university, the country did not have enough qualified teachers of an academic calibre. Their qualifications were questioned: a letter written to the Luxemburger Wort claimed that most examiners would not be able to pass their own exams. The problem was most serious for the subjects not taught in the cours supérieurs, such as law, medicine, the profession of notary, pharmacy, and veterinary studies. To resolve this issue, professional persons were appointed to juries: high-ranking state functionaries, practising doctors, and notables.

=== Reform around the turn of the 20th century ===
The period both before and after the turn of the 20th century saw education reform. In the late 19th century, the political class became aware that the traditional system of education was not well-adapted to the needs of an industrial society. Economic developments had created new social and professional classes. A middle class of employees and civil servants emerged from the growth of state services and administration. Artisanship and trade were transformed by industrial and commercial progress.

The government of Baron Félix de Blochausen (1874–1885) enacted a decisive reform of primary education when it introduced obligatory schooling over the opposition of conservative deputies. School absenteeism was particularly widespread in rural areas, where the children helped on the fields. The "loi Kirpach" of 10 April 1881 (named after Henri Kirpach, the Director-General for the Interior) made school attendance mandatory between the ages of 6 and 12. This reform provoked bitter debates over the role of the state in society and the relations between church and state. The law also provided for a single system of public schools, and made it the state's duty to organise education. At the same time, however, the church remained involved, since the local parish priest was an ex officio member of the local commune's school commission, and the schoolteacher was under his supervision.

Through a far-reaching reform of the education system, the government of Paul Eyschen (1888–1915) attempted to respond to the changes in society. Eyschen was an advocate of the idea of specialisation of schools: the Athénée de Luxembourg for those intending to later pursue university studies, an industrial school for those destined for a technical occupation, an agriculture school for farmers' sons, and a craftwork school for the sons of craftsmen. Particular attention was given to vocational education.

The law of 1892 split off the industrial and commercial school from the Athénée and added to it a commercial section. In 1908, it moved to Limpertsberg, to later become the Lycée des Garçons de Luxembourg. The law of 1896 created an artisanal school. These efforts were accompanied by an increase in students attending secondary school under the Eyschen government: 875 in 1879-1880 compared to 2500 in 1919-1920. In 1891, the Soeurs de la Doctrine Chrétienne had responded to the government's invitation by opening a domestic agricultural school for young girls.

In the latter half of the 19th century, Echternach and Diekirch had each received a so-called "pro-gymnasium", which operated under the supervision of the headteacher of the Athénée. Later, these too became autonomous institutions, and the Athénée lost its tight grip on secondary and higher education in Luxembourg.

Eyschen's government also tackled primary education through the Education Law of 1912. This abolished school fees, and made school mandatory for 7 years. Most controversially, it rolled back the Church's position in schools: teachers no longer needed a certificate of morality from their priest to be employed, and were no longer obliged to teach religious education. The law of 1912 was the subject of bitter arguments between the Left Bloc (socialists and liberals) and the clerical Right.

While in the rest of Europe, universities were opening their doors to women, Luxembourg was a late-comer in this regard. The establishment of two Lycées for young girls in 1909 and 1911 revealed the government's preoccupation with denying girls access to the Latin section, which granted sole access to universities. It was not until after the First World War, when they received the right to vote, that the first women attended exams for academic awards.

=== Religious influence ===
The state and the middle-class liberals who ran the government steadfastly refused to allow the opening of non-state schools, as demanded by the Church. At the same time, they allowed the clergy a lot of influence in teaching. The liberal Deputy Robert Brasseur complained of a "clericalisation of education". Around 20% of the secondary school professors were clerics, and this did not include the lay members of the Jesuits (Jésuites en courte robe) alleged by Brasseur. Students in the cours supérieurs were obliged to participate in religious processions, and to attend Mass and confession every Sunday and Thursday. Some criticised the philosophy lessons, firmly in the hands of the philosopher-preachers, as being a "theology course in disguise." In 1903 the Athénée's director tried to forbid students from attending a conference on the subject of the formation of the world, given by a Brussels professor. To some, it appeared that maintaining the cours supérieurs was a means of keeping a check on the students' ideology, whereas those who studied abroad might pick up foreign, radical ideas.

==== Catholic university ====
Until 1881, the Church still had plans for establishing a Catholic university in Luxembourg. In 1867, the General Assembly of Catholic Associations in Germany was looking for a location for a new free Catholic university—that is to say, one run by the Church. Luxembourgish priests campaigned for this to be in Luxembourg, emphasising the benefits this would bring to the country, and the government pledged its help, but the Chamber of Deputies was opposed. In any case, the new university was established in Fribourg in Switzerland instead. In 1881, Luxembourgish priests attempted to establish a university run by the Jesuits, who had been expelled from France. Neighbouring countries, however, were against the Jesuits setting up in the Grand Duchy, and the project was abandoned.

=== 1968 reforms ===
The Werner-Cravatte government (1964–1969) once again saw an urgent need to reform the education system, due to economic and social changes. The government attempted to respond by diversifying the types of Lycées in existence. 1965 saw the creation of middle schools (écoles moyennes): these were intended to cater to young people not quite suited for a university education, in order to prepare them for mid-level careers in the administration or the private sector, and to take the weight off the over-crowded Lycées. May 1968 also saw unrest in Luxembourg: the students of the cours supérieurs went on strike, demanding a reform of higher education and the awarding of academic degrees. The Werner-Cravatte government drafted a law which would not, however, come to a vote until the next government was in office. The Werner-Cravatte Ministry did introduce changes in the secondary education system: it aligned girls' education—previously in separate Lycées—with that of boys, and introduced co-education. Secondary education (as opposed to technical secondary education) was unified: two streams could be chosen, "classical" with Latin, and "modern", without Latin. For the upper school years, four sections were introduced.

It was under the second Werner-Schaus ministry that the system of academic awards dating back to 1848 was finally abolished, fulfilling the demands of the 1968 students. The law of 18 June 1969 stipulated that instead, degrees from other countries would be certified in Luxembourg.

=== Current system ===
In 1970, the cours supérieurs were integrated into the new "Centre universitaire de Luxembourg".

The Werner-Flesch government (1980–1984) introduced a move that harmonised public and private secondary schools: the law of 31 May 1982 provided for state subsidies for private schools, in return for allowing the state to supervise their curricula and their teachers' qualifications.

The initial idea of creating a Luxembourgish university was raised in a debate in the Chamber in 1993. In 2000, the government introduced a white paper on the matter. The law creating a University of Luxembourg was approved by the Chamber on 17 July 2003.

The Juncker-Polfer government also introduced further changes in secondary education. Tests conducted for the Programme for International Student Assessment (PISA) ranked Luxembourgish students 30th out of 32 countries. The government therefore launched a "back to basics" programme. The conservative-socialist government from 2004 to 2009 also set up several new schools outside of the mainstream system, with innovative teaching methods: the "Neie Lycée" (now "Lycée Ermesinde"), "Eis Schoul", the "École de la 2e chance," and the Deutsch-Luxemburgisches Schengen-Lyzeum Perl.

The Centre national d'Information pour Jeunes (CIJ), the national youth information centre, is funded by the Ministry of Education and Youth.

== See also ==
- List of secondary schools in Luxembourg
- Education Law of 1912
