= CIJ (disambiguation) =

CIJ is a French toy brand.

CIJ can also refer to:

- Captain Aníbal Arab Airport, an airport in Cobija, Bolivia, by IATA code
- Centre for Investigative Journalism, a British charity that provides training about investigative journalism
- Centre Information Jeunes asbl, an organization in Luxembourg providing information to youth
- International Court of Justice, an international court of the United Nations, located in The Hague, Netherlands
- Continuous inkjet, a kind of inkjet printing technology
