= European School, Luxembourg I =

- Schola Europaea
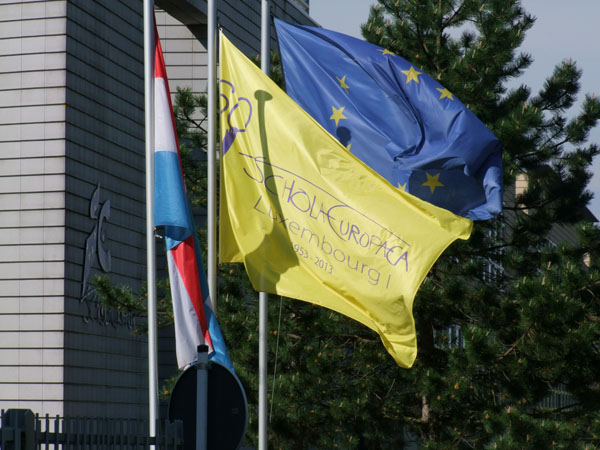

Location
- 23 Boulevard Konrad Adenauer; Kirchberg, Luxembourg City, L-1115; Luxembourg; 49°37′38″N 6°09′11″E

Information
- Type: European School
- Established: 1953
- Director: Martin Wedel (Germany)
- Gender: Mixed
- Age range: 4 to 18
- Enrolment: 3,303 (2024-25)
- Student Union/Association: The Pupils' Committee
- Sister Schools: 12 European Schools
- Diploma: European Baccalaureate
- Website: www.euroschool.lu

The European School, Luxembourg I (ESL1) was the first of the European Schools. It was founded in October 1953 on the initiative of officials of the European Coal and Steel Community, with the support of the Community's institutions and the government of Luxembourg. In April 1957, it formally became the first of the European Schools. It is located on the Kirchberg plateau in Luxembourg City since 1973.

== History ==
=== Boulevard de la Foire ===
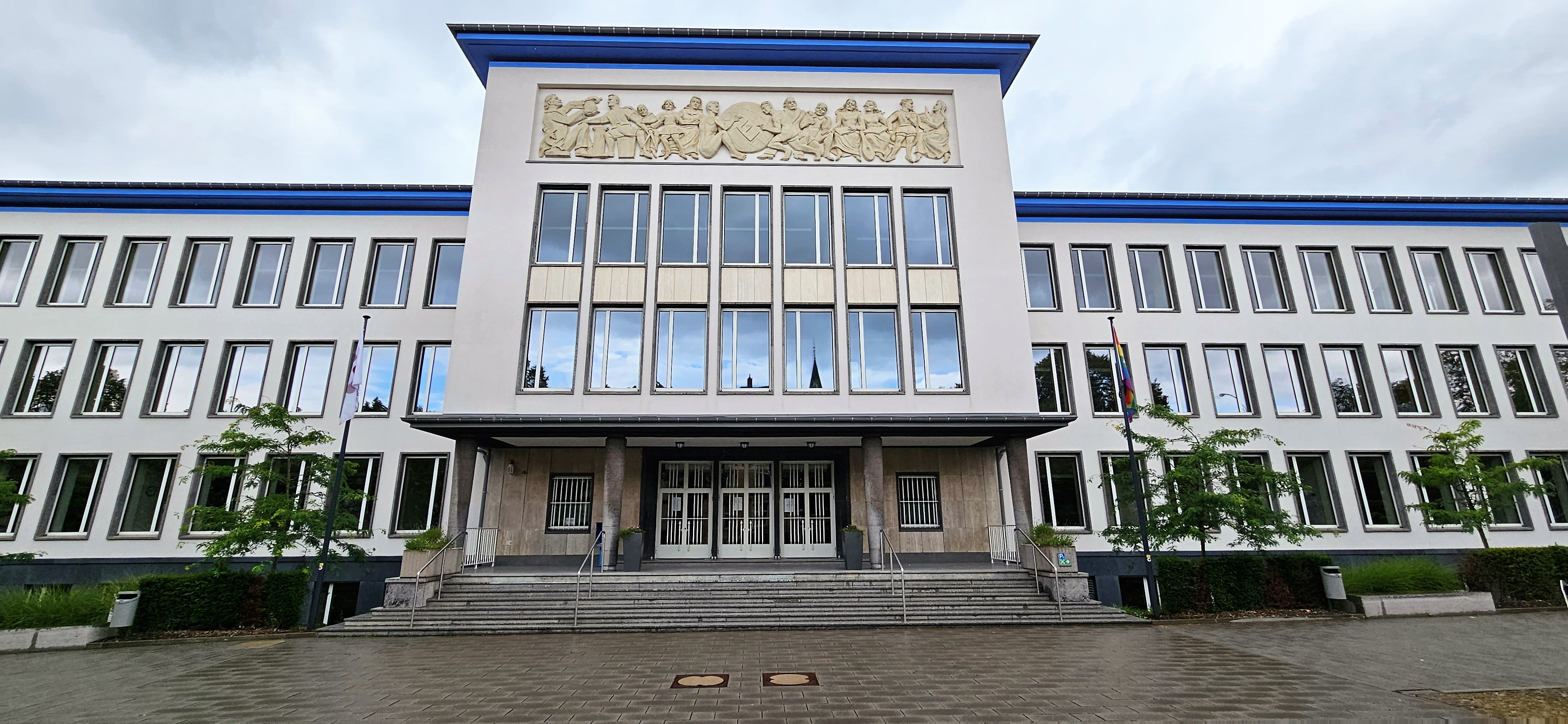
The school's former building, now home to the INLL, pictured in 2023

Parents working for the European Coal and Steel Community established the school in 1953. It became necessary to establish a new school when many European children from varying language backgrounds appeared.

When the school was founded it was located on the premises of a former furniture shop in the Limpertsberg district of Luxembourg City. It initially had 72 students. The school later moved to Villa Lentz in Hollerich. In 1956 construction began on a new building, located on Boulevard de la Foire, just outside the city centre. The building was opened on 11 December 1957. This building now houses Luxembourg's National Institute of Languages (INLL). The first students graduated in 1959; the graduating class was 23.

During the late 80s, the school re-used the building at Boulevard de la Foire, as an overflow school for three age groups of the primary school.

=== Kirchberg ===
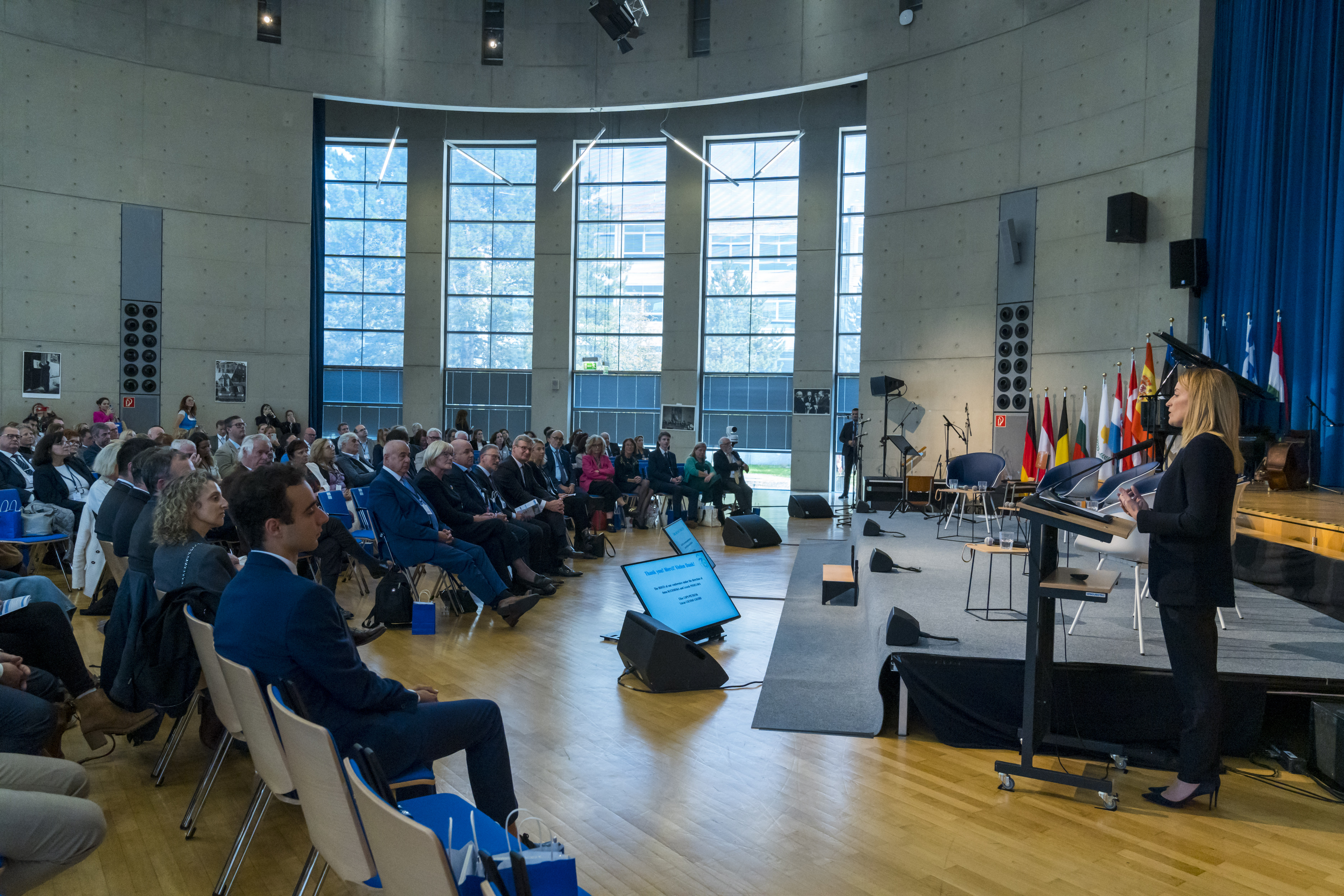
European Parliament President Roberta Metsola giving a speech at the school's reception hall in 2023.

The Boulevard de la Foire building was designed for a maximum capacity of 700 pupils, but by 1969, that number had ballooned to 1,557, with classes having to be held in every space possible, including in the attic, hallways and corridors. To remedy this, in November 1969, the Chamber of Deputies approved the construction of new premises for the school on the then largely undeveloped Kirchberg plateau, at a total cost of 363 million LUF. The school building on Kirchberg, at the time composed only of what are now blocks A, B and C, was designed by architect Paul Kayser and completed in September 1973, being formally inaugurated on 4 June 1975 in the presence of Grand Duke Jean and Grand Duchess Joséphine-Charlotte.

At the end of the 1990s, due to the consistent growth of the student population, the grounds on Kirchberg were completely redesigned. Old buildings were demolished and new ones (e.g. a new primary school building, an extension of the secondary school building and a new theatre building) were built, though three blocks of the secondary school (the current A, B and C blocks) were left standing. The new buildings went into use starting in September 1999. The prefabricated T and L blocks were added due to the high number of students. In 2012, the school relocated a large portion of students to a second European School of Luxembourg campus, situated in Bertrange. The L block was later demolished, its grounds replaced with a basketball court, though the T block remained standing.

In 2014 the Luxembourgish government signed an agreement for the European Schools to accept 100 more students in their English and French sections.

The school is due to be served by new branch of the Luxembourg City tramway by Autumn 2027.

== Students ==
As of 1999 the secondary school cycles consisted of three main sections, English, French, and German, each having two classes of students (classes A and B), while the Italian, Spanish, Portuguese, Dutch, and Greek sections only had one class of students per year each. Some students from Scandinavian countries also made up the Danish, Swedish, and Finnish sections, the latter two having been the newest addition to the language sections, just opened in 1995, respectively 1999. Due to their few numbers the students studied their mother tongue under special arrangements, and they shared many other classes such as Philosophy, Geography, History, and Human Science within the sections of their second language, which could be either in English, French, or German.

Some foreign students were also admitted in very rare cases, from countries that were not in the European Union at that time, but whose parents were working in Luxembourg. These included nationals from Romania, Russia, Turkey, and Bosnia, who were integrated into other language sections.

In the late 90s, the study of religion in the school was a compulsory subject, but it adhered to the Catholic Church which is the majoritarian religion in Luxembourg. For this reason many students could not opt in, therefore the school introduced the study of Ethics to students of Christian Orthodox, Muslim, Jewish, and other religions.

== Guinness World records ==
In 2002, as part of a special program called Science Week that was presented by several teachers of different sciences (physics, biology, and chemistry), Mr. John Watson who holds a Master of Science in Biology, had organized together with the school management and almost 3,000 of its pupils, a giant human DNA in an attempt to receive an entry in the Guinness Book of Records. The DNA which is made up of four simple building blocks called nucleotides, identified by the letters A, T, C, and G, was made with the help of pupils from both primary and secondary school cycles who stepped out in the courtyard, forming two rows facing the opposite direction and extending their right arms towards each other, wearing colored paper cuffs on their forearms, which represented the four letters of the building blocks of the DNA; their left arms resting on the shoulders of the pupils in front of them.

The world record for the largest human DNA helix was held in 2013 by the Hacettepe University in Turkey, with 3,034 participants, and as of 2016 it is held by the students from the Medical University of Varna in Bulgaria, with 4,000 participants.

== Incident ==
On 23 January 2001, two false bomb alerts caused the closure of the school's premises in the early mornings before the start of the classes. An unprecedented police presence ensued in collaboration with a special forces unit of the Luxembourgish police arriving by helicopter with bomb-sniffing dogs to inspect students' lockers. RTL, Luxembourg's main TV channel was also quick to arrive on the school grounds. Teachers from the school collaborated with the police in the first hour of their arrival to identify the perpetrator via a recording of his phone call.

Among the students, there was widespread criticism about how the Luxembourgish police managed the emergency situation by landing a police helicopter on a basketball court, which was seen as reckless, given that primary school pupils were still actively playing in the area.

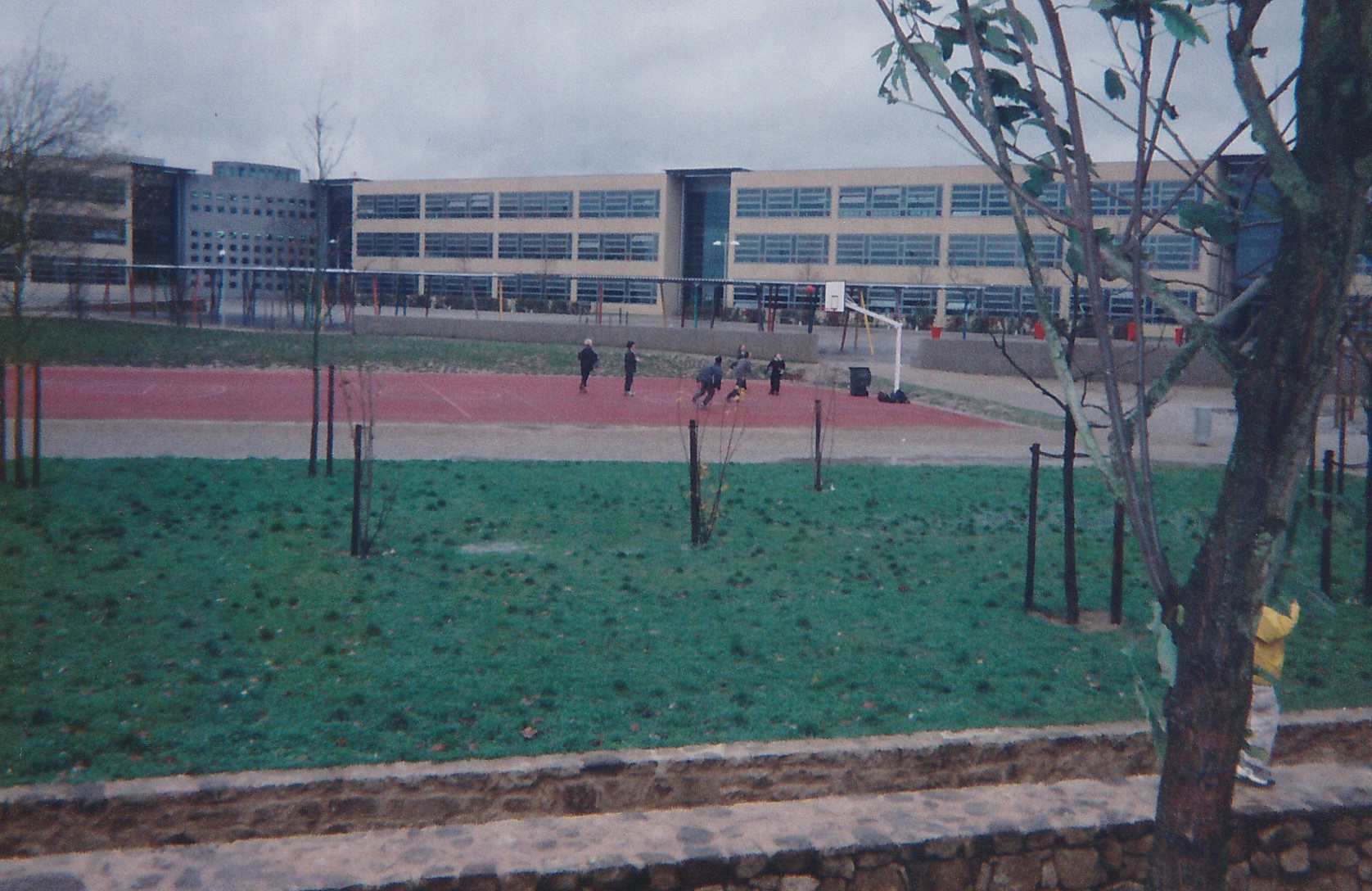
The basketball court pictured in 2003

A fictionalized account of the event takes place in the 2024 novel Into Babel by James Leader, a former teacher at the school.

== Notable alumni ==
- Martin Ågerup - Danish economist
- Eric Everard – founder and CEO of Artexis Group
- Christos Floros – Greek-Luxembourgish politician
- Marta Estévez García – Luxembourgish-Spanish international footballer
- Marc Hostert – radio personality
- Anoushé Husain - British paraclimber and civil servant
- Princess Margaretha of Liechtenstein – second daughter of the Grand Duke Jean of Luxembourg
- Elizabeth May – Olympic triathlete
- Brian Molko – lead singer, songwriter and guitarist of Placebo (initially attended the European School; transferred to the International School of Luxembourg)
- Fleur Maxwell – Luxembourgish former figure skater
- Claire Maxwell – sociologist
- Martine Reicherts - Luxembourgish politician, European Commissioner (2014)
- Amy Thompson – Luxembourgish footballer
- Henk van der Zwan – Dutch diplomat
