= Anoushé Husain =

Paraclimber

Anoushé Husain MBE (born 1987 or 1988) is a British paraclimber and civil servant.

== Early life and education ==
Husain was born and grew up in Luxembourg, and has British and Pakistani ancestry. She attended the European School of Luxembourg, obtaining her European Baccalaureate in 2005.

She was born with her right arm missing below the elbow, and has had other health problems including cancer and Ehlers–Danlos syndrome. Her parents were helped by the British charity Reach, which supports children with missing upper limbs and their parents. As a child she danced, swam competitively, played cricket and participated in martial arts. When she developed hypermobility her doctor told her to stop doing karate, and she was later diagnosed with Ehlers–Danlos. She had surgery on her thumb and her back, and at the age of 23 was diagnosed with cancer.

She has a degree in translation studies (French, English and Chinese, 2009) from the Institut Supérieur de Traducteurs et Interprètes in Brussels, and speaks eight languages. She has a master's degree in European governance (2012) from the University of Luxembourg.

== Climbing ==
Her first experience of climbing was on a school trip when she was eight years old, but she returned to the sport aged 23 after treatment for cancer.

In 2018 she co-founded Paraclimbing London, which "aims to create a safe space and help remove barriers disabled people might have in accessing climbing in London".

On 5 April 2022 she broke the world record for "greatest vertical distance climbed on a climbing wall with one hand in one hour (female)" when she climbed 374.85 metres (1,229.8 ft) at the Castle Climbing Centre in London.

== Outside climbing ==
Since 2020 she has been Diversity and Staff Engagement Lead at the Medicines and Healthcare products Regulatory Agency.

In 2017 she became an ambassador for Ehlers–Danlos Support UK (EDS-UK).

== Honours and recognition ==
Husain won the 2017 Helen Rollason Award for Inspiration in the Sunday Times Sportswomen of the Year Awards.

In 2018, Prime Minister Theresa May honoured Husain with the Points of Light award, describing her as "Paraclimbing ambassador".

Husain tells her story in her contribution to the 2022 book Tough Women, edited by Jenny Tough.

Husain was appointed Member of the Order of the British Empire (MBE) in the 2024 New Year Honours for services to people with disabilities as ambassador of Ehlers Danlos Support UK and LimbPower and disability champion. Her surname was spelled "Hussain" in the London Gazette.
