= Christos Floros =

Luxembourgish entrepreneur and political figure (born 1993)

Personal details
- Born: 13 November 1993 (age 33) Athens, Greece
- Party: Democratic
- Education: University of Luxembourg; University of Essex; Oxford Brookes University; European School, Luxembourg I
- Occupation: Entrepreneur, architect, journalist, author

Christos Floros (born 13 November 1993) is a Greek-born Luxembourgish entrepreneur and politician of the Democratic Party (DP).

== Biography ==
=== Early life ===
Floros was born in Athens, Greece, in 1993 and moved to Luxembourg with his parents in 1994. His father, who had previously worked for the European Commission in the 1980s, decided to relocate the family to Luxembourg.

Floros attended the European School, Luxembourg I, where he served as President of the Pupils' Committee.

=== Education ===
Floros studied architecture at Oxford Brookes University in Oxford, and completed a master's degree in Architecture, European Urbanisation and Globalisation at the University of Luxembourg. He also undertook studies at Harvard University and the Pratt Institute.

Between 2015 and 2018, Floros trained as an actor at the East 15 Acting School of the University of Essex, where he wrote his first play, Generation Z or Uncertainty of a Scattered Mind.

=== Professional career ===
After graduating from the East 15 Acting School, Floros worked as an actor in London, appearing primarily in stage productions.

Between 2022 and 2023, he worked for RTL in Luxembourg, covering news and political topics. He also produced and hosted Conversations with Christos, a series of interviews with Luxembourgish public figures, including Vice-President of the European Parliament Marc Angel, former Deputy Prime Minister Colette Flesch, and Mayor of Luxembourg City Lydie Polfer. His work at RTL frequently addressed immigration and integration issues in Luxembourg.

As of 2023, Floros has worked in Luxembourg’s technology sector and in social media analytics.

In 2025, Floros announced that he was leading Monnett, an initiative aimed at developing a European social media platform. According to Floros, the project seeks to challenge Meta Platforms’ dominance in online social networks.

=== Politics and civil rights ===
In Luxembourg, Floros is known for using both social media and traditional media to promote political discourse.

In 2022, he was one of Luxembourg’s representatives at the Conference on the Future of Europe.

In 2023, Floros founded Change for Luxembourg, a non-partisan political movement aiming to include more residents in Luxembourgish politics. He has stated that the idea was inspired by his volunteering experience during the COVID-19 pandemic: “half of the volunteers were Luxembourgers, the other half foreigners.” According to Floros, this experience highlighted how people across communities mobilised for Luxembourg’s national interest, motivating his advocacy for broader political participation.

In 2024, the Democratic Party (DP) announced that Floros would run on its list for the 2024 European Parliament election alongside Charles Goerens, as one of three members of the Democratic and Liberal Youth (JDL) running. Floros obtained 28,874 votes, placing him on the 21st position nationally, and was not elected.

During the campaign, Floros advocated for strengthening cybersecurity as part of Europe’s collective defence, promoted strategic autonomy, and supported increased investment in artificial intelligence research within Europe.

Floros is considered a progressive figure within the Democratic Party and supports a strongly pro-European platform. In October 2024, he was elected president of DP International, the international branch of the Democratic Party. Floros is a member of the Party’s Steering Committee.

== Publications ==
- Generation Z or Uncertainty of a Scattered Mind
- Kirchberg, Luxembourg City: From Farmland to a Multicultural, Political and Financial Centre (2014)
- Neighbourhood in Kirchberg, Luxembourg (2022)
