= Marc Hostert =

- Born: 18 July 1965 (age 61); Luxembourg, Luxembourg
- Occupations: Luxembourg Government Official, TV presenter
- Known for: RTL Luxembourg TV shows Success Story and Kapital, RTL radio show Carte Blanche

Marc Hostert (born 18 July 1965) is a Luxembourgish civil servant who worked at the European Court of Auditors. Active in television and radio media in Luxembourg, he was one of the judges of the RTL Télé Lëtzebuerg television show Success Story. He also appears on the RTL Télé Lëtzebuerg show Kapital and the RTL Radio show Carte Blanche.

== Early life and education ==
Born in Luxembourg in 1965, Hostert attended the European School Luxembourg (ESL). He completed a Masters in Business Administration at the European Business School in Frankfurt, London and Paris and a degree in political and administrative sciences from Montpellier 1 University. He also studied under the supervision of Professor Susan Strange at the European University Institute in Florence. In 2013 he obtained a doctorate in general management at the conservatoire national des arts et métiers ( CNAM Paris) under the supervision of Professor Jean-Paul Lemaire ESCP Paris and Yvon Pesqueux CNAM Paris. The title of his PHD thesis was: Strategy for the internationalisation of a small open mature economy (SOME) : the case of Luxembourg : key elements, challenges and levers. In 2019, Hostert became a certified Director at Gubena Institut belge des Administrateurs and ILA Institut Luxembourgeois des Administrateurs.

== Professional life ==
=== Luxembourg Government ===
Having entered the Luxembourg civil service in 1993, Hostert was appointed Conseiller de Gouvernement 1st class on 10 October 2004 when he was also named Commissioner for administrative simplification for enterprises at the Ministry of Small and Medium-sized enterprises. He has since held several public positions in Luxembourg including:

- Director of enterprise policy department at the Ministry of the Economy and Foreign Trade
- Executive Chairman of the National Committee for Administrative Simplification for Enterprises
- Chairman of the Board of l'Institut National pour le Développement de la Formation Professionnelle Continue (INFPC)

=== European Court of Auditors ===
Since 2008, Hostert has worked at the European Court of Auditors, most recently as Head of the Private Office of Henri Grethen, the Member of the Court for Luxembourg. Better Regulation, Impact Assessment and Trans-European rail networks have been amongst his topics of interest.

=== Other professional activities ===
Hostert's other professional activities include the development of the www.eco.lu portal, through which he held the following positions:

- President of the Board of the Association Nationale des Etudiants en Sciences Economiques (ANESEC)
- Founding President of the Board of the Amicale et Mutuelle des Universitaires en Sciences Economiques (AMUSE)
- President of the Board of Fondation des Universitaires en Sciences économiques de Droit Luxembourgeois (FUSE)
- President of the Board of Cercle Artistique de Luxembourg

== Media appearances ==
Since 2000, Hostert has appeared on approximately 100 episodes of the RTL the TV broadcast Kapital on which he has interviewed politicians and national and international business people and economists. He is a regular contributor to the RTL Radio show Carte Blanche in which he offers his personal views on current topics. Since 2010, Marc has been one of the judges of the RTL television show Success Story in which potential entrepreneurs seek support for their business ideas.

== Publications ==
Publications include l’Entrepreuneuriat dans la Grande-Région, La politique de développement et de diversification économiques — Impact sur la création d’emplois nouveaux – Essai d’un Bilan 1975-1995 and Luxembourg – Tolerant but conservative.
