= Campus Geesseknäppchen =

Coordinates: 49°36′08″N 06°06′35″E

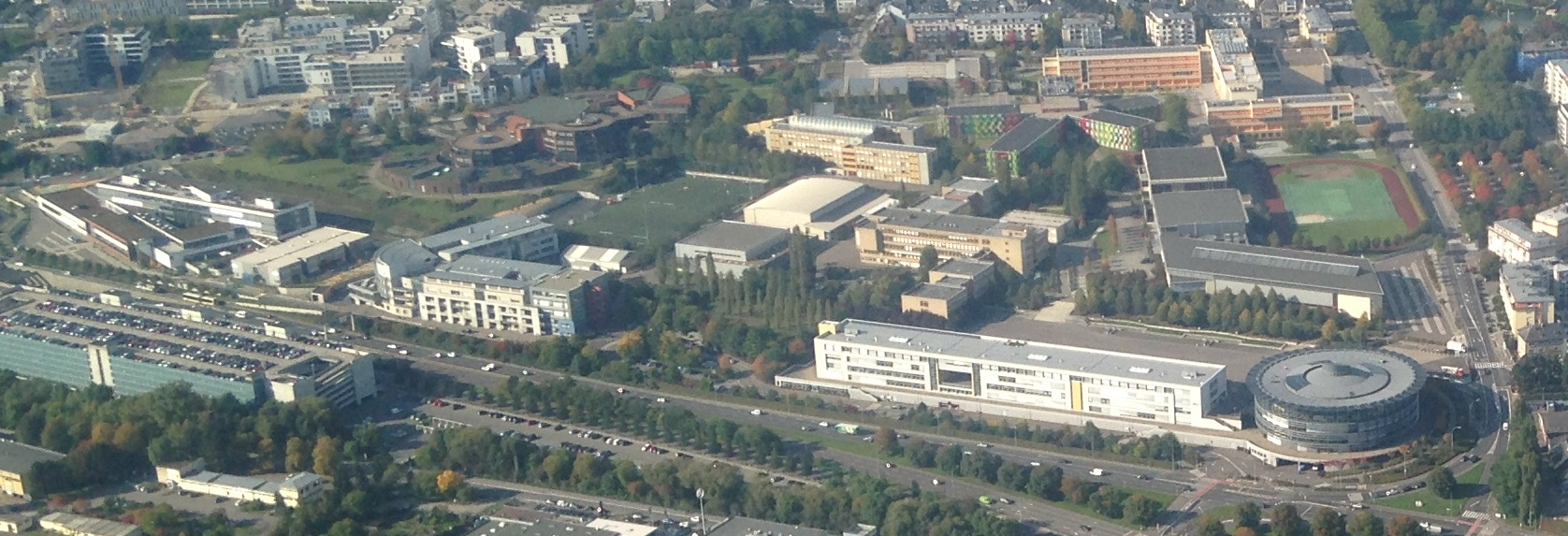
Campus Geesseknäppchen

Campus Geesseknäppchen is a school campus in Luxembourg City, in southern Luxembourg, that is shared by a number of academic institutions and sports facilities of said institutions.

The campus is located in the southwest of the city, just to the north of the terminus of the A4 motorway. It is predominantly in the district of Hollerich, although the western part (including the Conservatoire) lies in Merl. Shaped roughly like a right triangle, the campus measures 800 metres (880 yards) east-west along the hypotenuse, and 520 metres (570 yards) north-south at its maximum.

Geesseknäppchen is the site of:

- Athénée de Luxembourg
- Conservatoire de Luxembourg
- International School of Luxembourg
- Lycée Aline Mayrisch
- Lycée Michel Rodange
- École de Commerce et de Gestion
- École Nationale pour Adultes
- École Internationale Gaston Thorn

The campus has shared sporting facilities, including an athletics track, five sports halls, an Olympic size swimming pool, and a football (soccer) pitch.

Campus Geesseknäppchen contains a big, round, glass building known as the Forum Geesseknäppchen that contains a canteen, café, makerspace, and an auditorium which hosts many events.
