= St Joseph's Church, Limpertsberg =

Church in Luxembourg City

Coordinates: 49.62057°N 6.12094°E

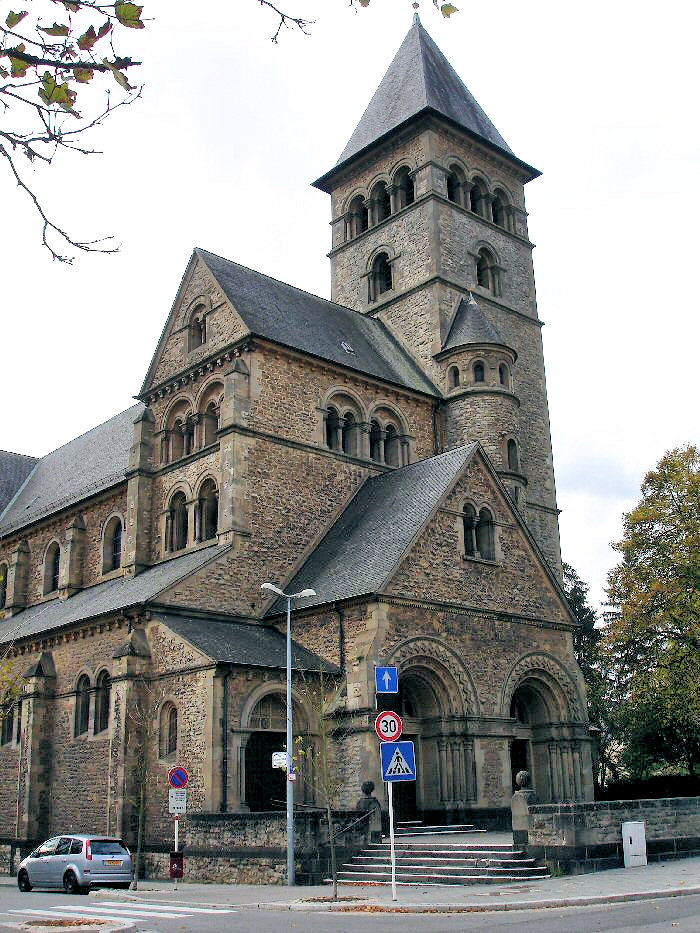
Exterior of St Joseph's church

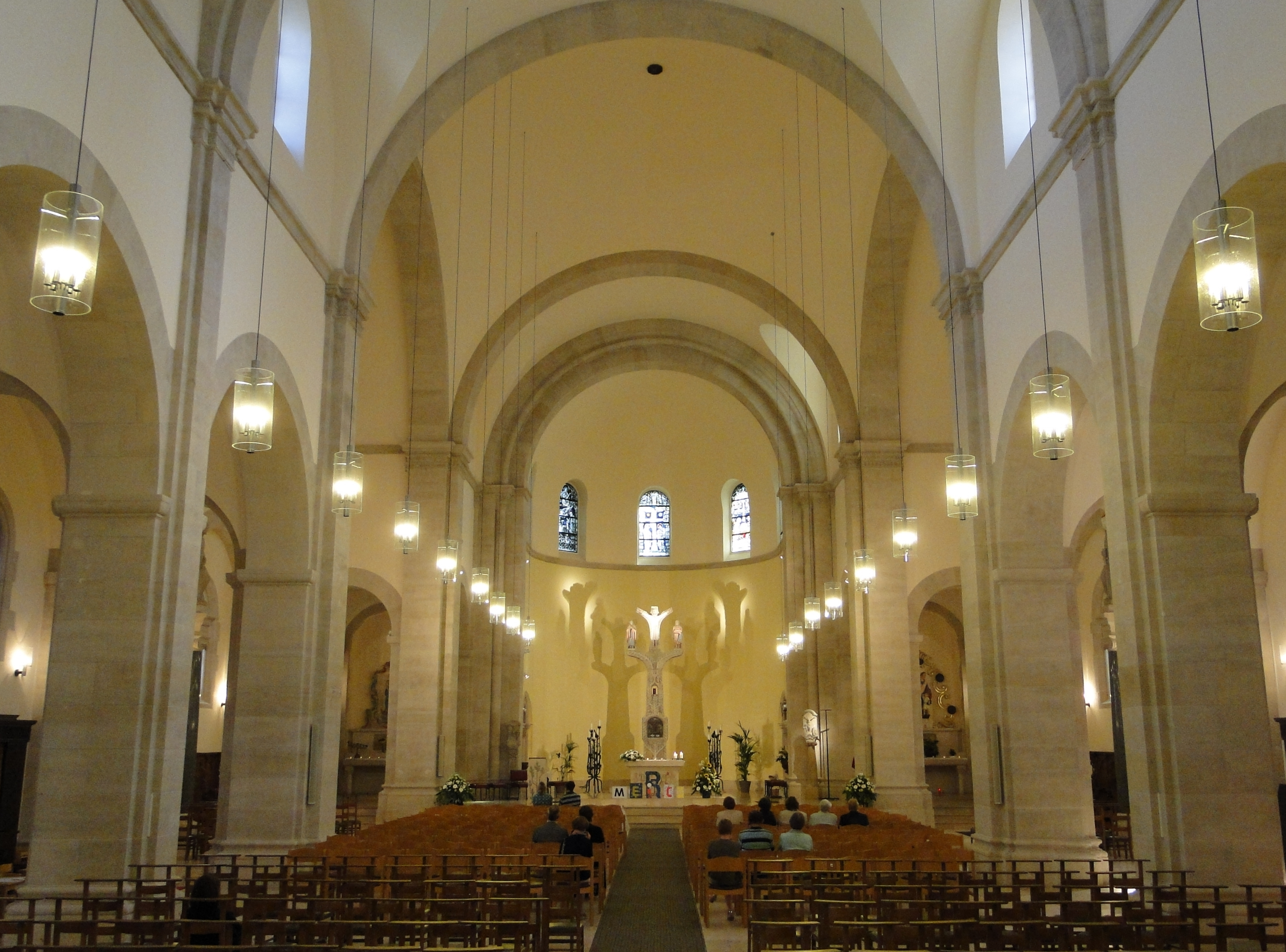
Interior of St Joseph's church

St Joseph's Church is a Roman Catholic church in the Limpertsberg district of Luxembourg City, in southern Luxembourg. Designed by the Luxembourgish architect Nicolas Petit in the Neo-Romanesque style, it was completed in 1913 and consecrated on 30 April of the same year. The interior was substantially renovated in 1976 by the German architect Willy Hahn who added a tabernacle column symbolizing the tree of life.

== History ==
In 1909, the Luxembourg City Communal Council decided a church with an adjoining rectory should be built in Limpertsberg, given the district's growing population (then some 3,000) and its considerable distance from the city's Notre-Dame Cathedral. Planned by Luxembourg City's architect Nicolas Petit, construction of the church was undertaken by Achille Giorgetti from 1910 to 1913, reflecting the growing prosperity of the Limpersberg district. It was consecrated in 1913. In 1976, the city and parochial authorities sought to enhance the interior by improving the furnishings, calling on the services of the architect Willy Hahn from nearby Trier. At the same time, with a view to improving the lighting, new windows illuminating the nave were created by the Luxembourgish architect and artist André Haagen.

== Architecture and furnishings ==
The church is one of Luxembourg's main examples of Romanesque Revival architecture. In addition to an imposing exterior making it one of Limpertsberg's most outstanding buildings, the well-proportioned interior is reminiscent of the 13th-century Romanesque churches of the Rhineland. The style is similar to that of Clervaux Abbey which had been designed by the Dutch-German architect Johannes Franziskus Klomp a few years earlier. St Joseph's holds a special place in Luxembourgish architecture as it is the last church to have been built in the Neo-Romanesque style.

As for the furnishings, the tabernacle column behind the altar is of special note. Symbolizing the tree of life, it rises to a height of 6.5 meters (21 ft) and is topped by a calvary. The church also houses a 17th-century statue of the Immaculate Conception enhanced with a sculpture of Saint Joseph created by the Luxembourger Albert Hames (1910–89).

The original organ was replaced in 1955 by a larger instrument manufactured by Kemper & Sohn of Lübeck.
