= Sidetracked (magazine) =

- Editor-in-Chief: John Summerton
- Categories: Adventure Travel; Extreme Sports
- Frequency: Tri-annual
- First issue: Web: June 2011; Print: April 2014
- Company: Captive Minds Communications Group
- Country: United Kingdom
- Based in: London
- Language: English
- Website: www.sidetracked.com

Sidetracked is an online and print magazine that aims to capture the experience of adventure travel and extreme sports through personal stories. The magazine was started as a website in 2011 but in 2014 moved into print with a bi-annual journal. Sidetracked also gifts an annual grant to explorers through its adventure fund. Its editor-in-chief is John Summerton; the editor is Alex Roddie; the photo editor is Martin Hartley; the deputy editor is Jenny Tough; sub-editor is Emily Woodhouse. Contributing editors include Daniel Neilson, Tom Hill, and Harriet Folkes.
