= Hollerich-Bonnevoie =

Legal name for the then-commune of Hollerich

Coordinates: 49.601°N 6.119°E

Hollerich-Bonnevoie (German: Hollerich-Bonneweg) was the legal name of a part, formally section (German: Sektion), of the then-commune of Hollerich, in southern Luxembourg. It covered the neighbourhoods of Hollerich, Bonnevoie, and Gare, which formed the urbanised part of the commune, separated from Luxembourg City by the Pétrusse.

City status was conferred upon Hollerich-Bonnevoie on 7 April 1914. The city, with the rest of the commune, merged into Luxembourg City on 26 March 1920, when the city status lapsed.
