= Martine Reicherts =

Luxembourgish politician (born 1957)

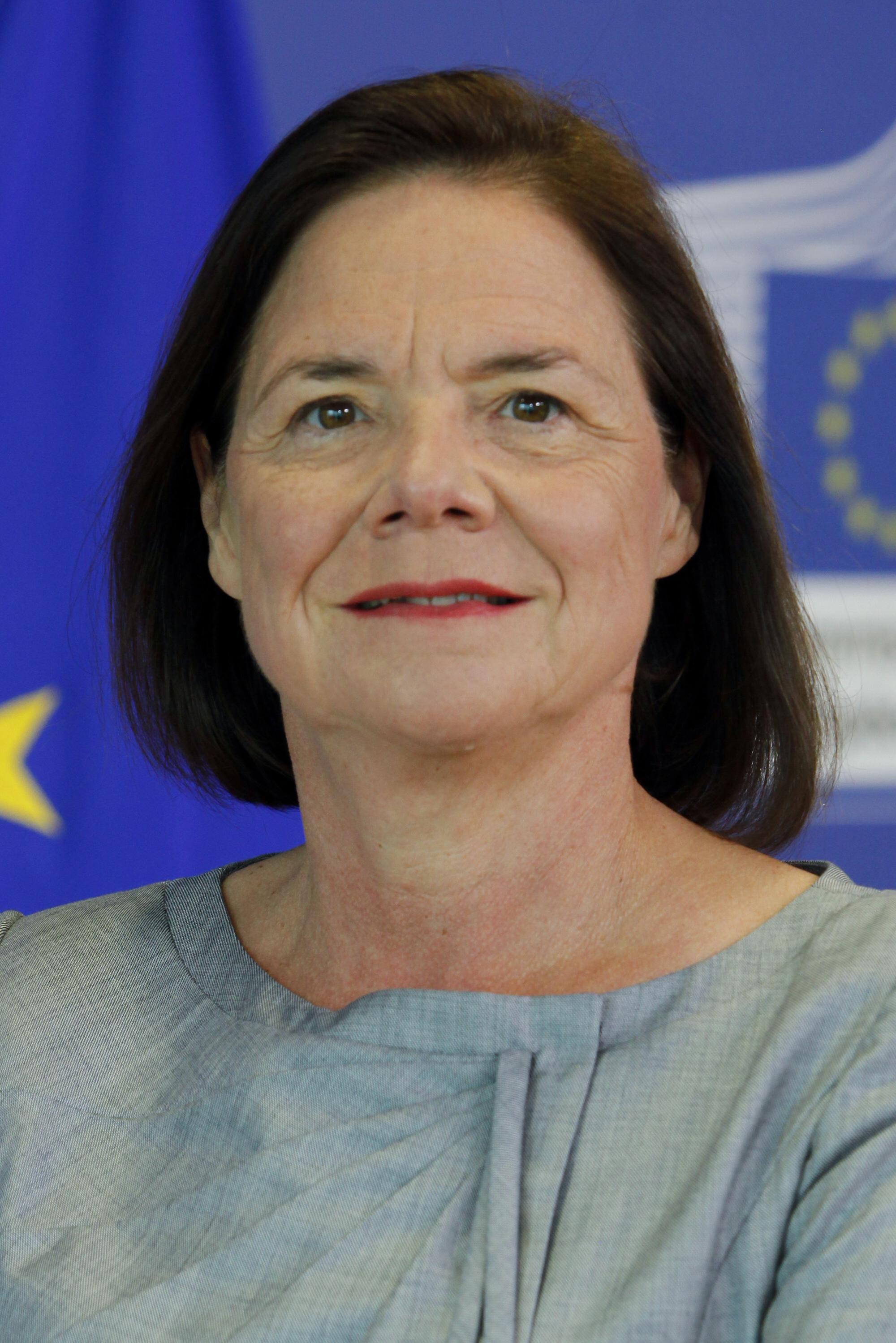
Reicherts in 2014

Martine Reicherts (born 13 April 1957) is a Luxembourgish politician who served as European Commissioner in 2014 and as the European Union's Director-General for Education, Youth, Sport and Culture until her retirement in 2018, when she was replaced by Themis Christophidou. She had previously held the post of Director-General of the Office for Official Publications of the European Union.

She was born in Luxembourg City, Luxembourg, and educated at the European School, Luxembourg I. She studied at the University of Luxembourg, University of Nice, University of Aix-en-Provence and University "Paris II" and has a Master of Laws and a D.E.A. in Business Law. After practising as a lawyer at the bar in Luxembourg from 1980 to 1984 she worked at the European Commission from 1984 until her retirement in 2018. From 1988 to 1991 she taught taxation at the Solvay Brussels School of Economics and Management.

She served as a European Commissioner in the Barroso Commission, with a portfolio of Justice, Fundamental Rights and Citizenship.
