= Troy Blacklaws =

South African writer and teacher

- Born: Troy Michael Douglas Blacklaws; September 9, 1965 (age 61); Pinetown, Natal Province South Africa
- Education: Rhodes University, South Africa; Goethe University, Germany
- Occupation: Author
- Website: www.troyblacklaws.com

Troy Blacklaws (born 9 September, 1965) is a writer and teacher from South Africa. He was in Pinetown, Natal Province. After his schooling at Paarl Boys' High School he studied at Rhodes University before being conscripted in to the South African Defence Force. After serving in the army Blacklaws began teaching English. He is currently teaching at the International School of Luxembourg.

Blacklaws' first novel, Karoo Boy, was published in 2004. The book was described as "a riotous vision of 1976 Cape Town" in Anderson Tepper's Village Voice review and "sensual, cinematic" in The New York Times.

His second novel was Blood Orange, the story of a white boy in Africa. It was first published in 2005 and is a fusion of memoir and fiction. The novel was adapted for the stage by Blacklaws, Greig Coetzee and Craig Morris. The play, directed by Coetzee, was first performed by Morris at the National Arts Festival in Grahamstown, South Africa, in July 2006.

In 2010 Blacklaws published a fable: Bafana Bafana : A Story of Soccer, Magic and Mandela. Art by Andrew Stooke. Vikas Swarup, author of Slumdog Millionaire, had this to say of it: "A magical fable. Troy Blacklaws effortlessly conjures up the sights, sounds and rhythms of the South African landscape."

His third novel, Cruel Crazy Beautiful World, was published in 2011 in South Africa. The words of the title are taken from a song by Johnny Clegg. The story is set in post-apartheid South Africa in 2004.

== Novels ==
- Karoo Boy: A Novel. Open Road Media. 2004. ISBN 978-1-4804-1002-2.
- Blood Orange: A Novel. Open Road Media. 2005. ISBN 978-1-4804-1001-5.
- Bafana Bafana: A Story of Soccer, Magic and Mandela. Open Road Media. 2010. ISBN 978-1-4804-1000-8.
- Cruel Crazy Beautiful World: A Novel. Jacana Media. 2011. ISBN 978-1-4314-0250-2.
