= Stade Josy Barthel =

Football stadium in Luxembourg City, Luxembourg

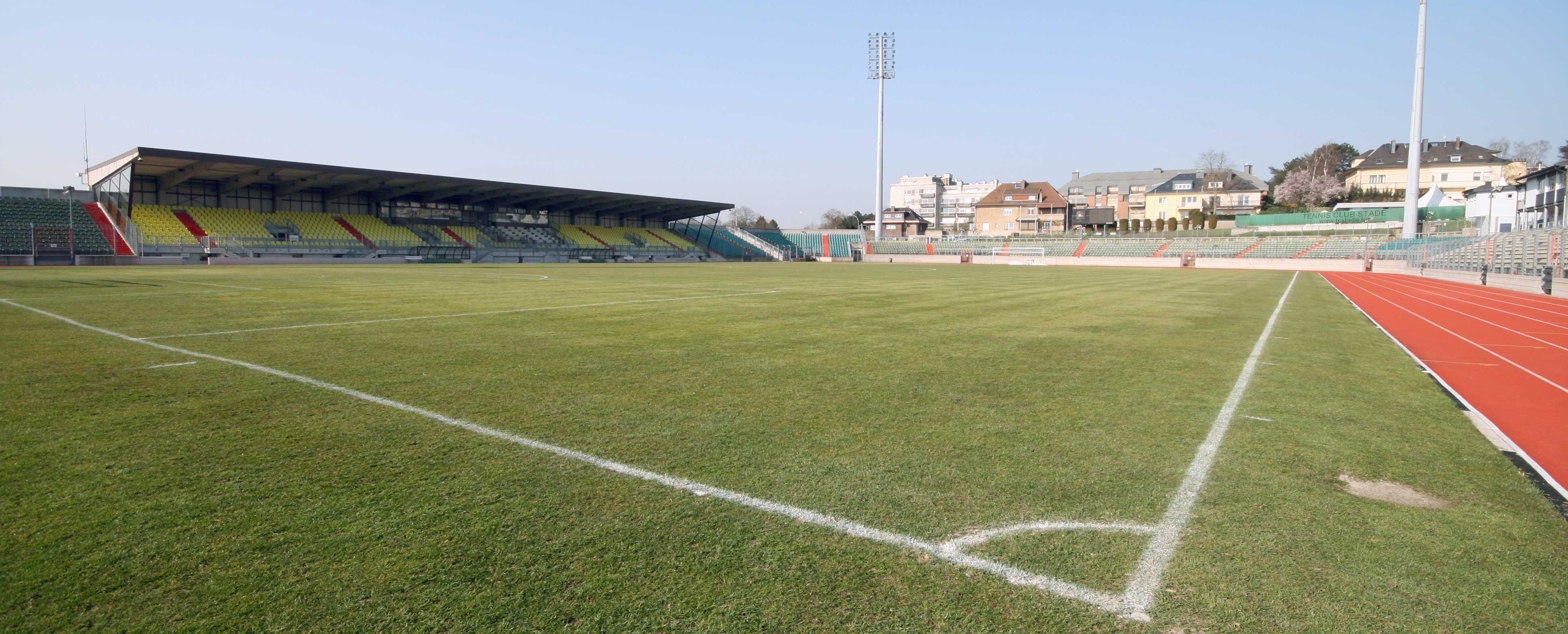
- Interactive map of Stade Josy Barthel
- Former names: Stade Municipal (1931–1993)
- Location: Belair, Luxembourg City, Luxembourg
- Coordinates: 49°36′56″N 6°06′35″E
- Capacity: 8,022

Construction
- Built: 1928–1931
- Opened: 1931
- Renovated: 1990
- Closed: 2021
- Reopened: 9 November 2023

Tenant
- Luxembourg national football team (until 2021)

The Stade Josy Barthel is the former national stadium of Luxembourg, and the former home of the Luxembourg national football team. The stadium, which also hosted rugby union and athletics events, is located on route d'Arlon, in the Luxembourg City district of Belair. Following the opening of the Stade de Luxembourg in September 2021, the stadium and its grounds are currently due for demolition and redevelopment, to be ultimately replaced with a new mixed use neighbourhood named "Wunnquartier Stade".

== History ==
Originally called Stade Municipal after its construction in 1928–1931, it was entirely rebuilt in 1990. Since July 1993, it has borne the name of Joseph "Josy" Barthel, the 1500m gold medalist at the 1952 Olympics: Luxembourg's only Olympic gold medal winner. The stadium is also home to the biggest athletics club in the country, CAL Spora Luxembourg. The spectator capacity is 7,983, some under cover, some in the open air.

In 2014 it was announced that an investment of €230,000 would be required to get the stadium up to a sufficient standard to hold the qualifying matches for Euro 2016.

In June 2014, the Luxembourg Ministry of Sport, in conjunction with the Luxembourg City administration, decided upon the construction of the new Stade de Luxembourg in Gasperich, which opened in 2021. As a result, the Luxembourg City authorities have announced their intentions to demolish the Stade Josy Barthel and redevelop its grounds and surrounding areas.

The Luxembourg national football team played its last official game at the Josy Barthel Stadium on 30 March 2021, a 3–1 defeat to Portugal in the 2022 World Cup qualifiers.

== See also ==
- Stade de Luxembourg
