= Lycée Michel Rodange =

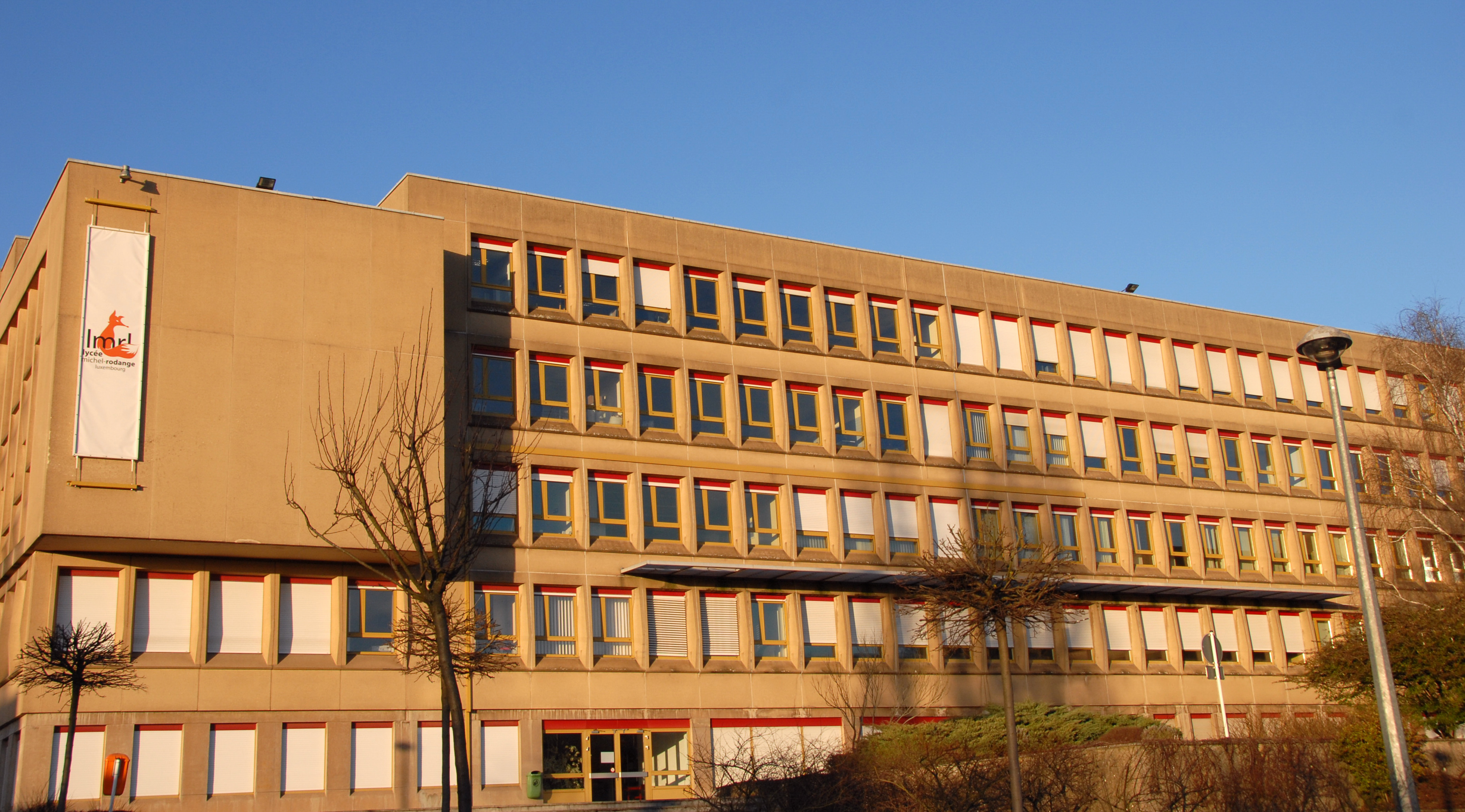

Location
- Luxembourg City; Luxembourg
- 49°36′06″N 06°06′38″E

Information
- Type: High school (Classic secondary school)
- Established: 1968
- Principal: Jean-Claude Hemmer
- Campus size: 0.2 km^{2} (0.1 sq mi)
- Campus type: Campus Geesseknäppchen
- Website: http://www.lmrl.lu

Lycée Michel Rodange, abbreviated to LMRL, is a high school in Luxembourg City, in southern Luxembourg. It is located on Campus Geesseknäppchen, along with several other educational institutions, most of which, including Lycée Michel Rodange, is in the district of Hollerich, in the south-west of the city.

It was founded by law on 5 August 1968 as the 'Nouveau Lycée de Luxembourg' (English: Luxembourg New School), but was renamed by Grand Ducal decree on 19 January 1970 to its current name, after Michel Rodange, the author of Luxembourg's national epic, Rénert the Fox. Rodange counts Jean-Claude Juncker, the President of the European Commission as its alumnus.
