= Lycée Aline Mayrisch =

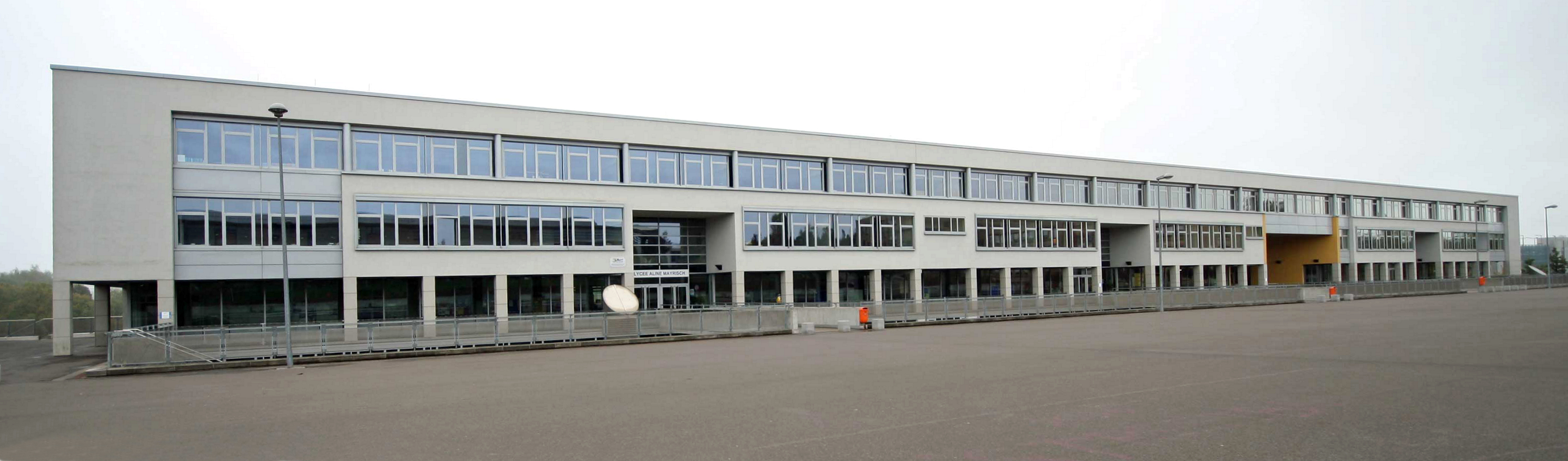

Location
- Luxembourg City; Luxembourg
- 49°36′02″N 06°06′42″E

Information
- Type: Classical secondary school
- Established: 2001
- Principal: Carole Chaine
- Campus size: 0.2 km^{2} (0.1 sq mi)
- Campus type: Campus Geesseknäppchen
- Website: http://www.laml.lu

The Lycée Aline Mayrisch is a high school in Luxembourg City, in southern Luxembourg. It is located on Campus Geesseknäppchen, along with several other educational institutions, most of which, including the Lycée Aline Mayrisch, is in the district of Hollerich, in the south-west of the city.

It is named after Aline Mayrisch: a famous women's rights campaigner, socialite, and philanthropist, President of the Luxembourgish Red Cross, and wife of industrialist Émile Mayrisch.
