= Hollerich =

District of Luxembourg City, Luxembourg

Hollerich Hollerech (Luxembourgish)
- District
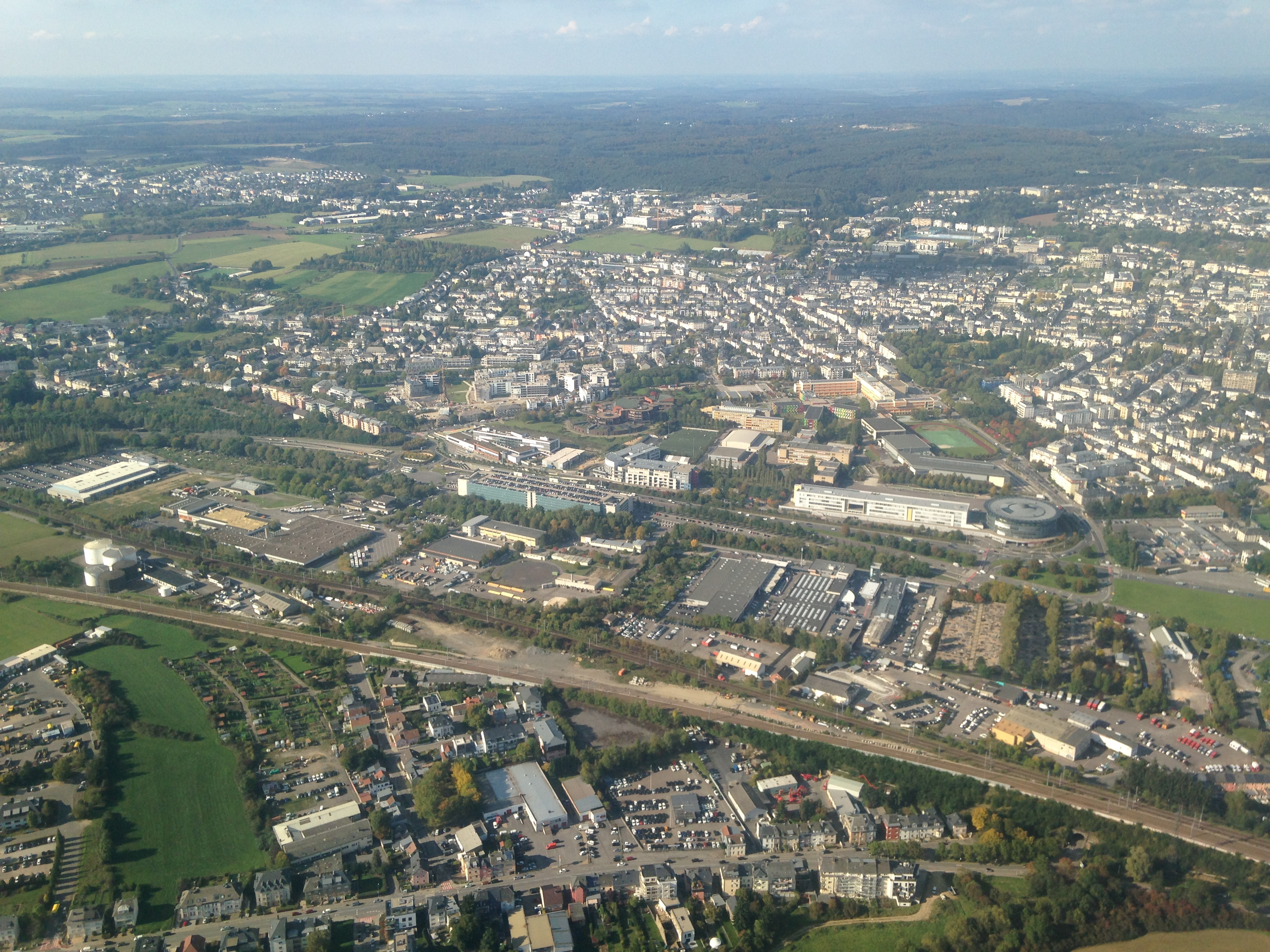

- Hollerich is one of 24 districts in Luxembourg City
- Coordinates: 49.627869°N 6.153422°E
- Country: Luxembourg
- Commune: Luxembourg City

Area
  - Total: 1.6001 km^{2} (0.6178 sq mi)

Population (31 December 2025)
  - Total: 7,751
  - Density: 4,844/km^{2} (12,550/sq mi)

Nationality
  - Luxembourgish: 28.10%
  - Other: 71.90%
- Website: Hollerich

Hollerich (German pronunciation: [ˈhɔləʁɪç]; Luxembourgish: Hollerech, pronounced [ˈholəʀəɕ]) is a district in south-western Luxembourg City, in southern Luxembourg.

As of 31 December 2025, the district has a population of 7,751 inhabitants.

Hollerich railway station is located on CFL Line 70, which connects Luxembourg City to the south-west of the country. Hollerich station is only 600 metres to the south-west of the country's main terminus, Luxembourg railway station, and just to the west of a major junction that separates traffic exiting Luxembourg station to the south. The urban park Parc Merl is located on its border with Belair.

== Education ==
The Campus Geesseknäppchen, the largest educational campus in Luxembourg City, is located within the district. Five educational establishments are premised on the site; the Athénée de Luxembourg, the International School of Luxembourg, Lycée Aline Mayrisch, the Lycée Michel Rodange, the Lycée Technique École de Commerce et de Gestion) and the Conservatoire de Luxembourg. The campus boasts a number of shared facilities, including an Olympic size swimming pool.

== Commune ==
Hollerich Hollerech
- Former commune of Luxembourg
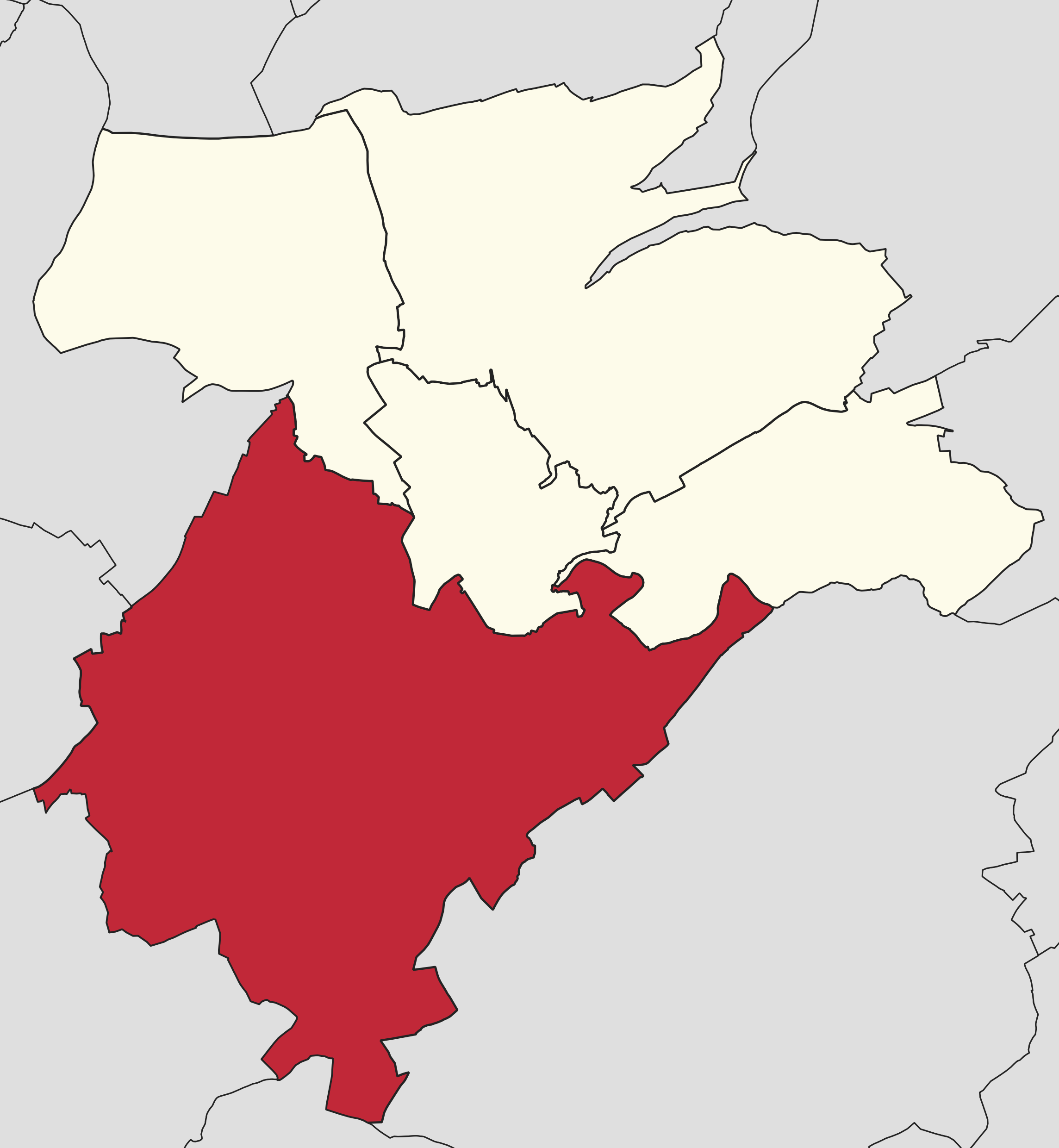
- Map of Luxembourg City before 1920, with the Commune of Hollerich highlighted in red
- Country: Luxembourg
- District: Luxembourg
- Canton: Luxembourg
- Created: Original commune
- Abolished: 26 March 1920

Area
  - Total: 21.062 km^{2} (8.132 sq mi)

Population (1916)
  - Total: 15,402
  - Density: 731.27/km^{2} (1,894.0/sq mi)
- Currently: Part of Luxembourg City

Hollerich was first mentioned in a document in the 10th century. In the course of the French administrative reorganisation of 1796, it achieved the status of a separate commune. In 1859, Luxembourg's railway station was built on the commune's territory. This facilitated its modern development from a farming village located at the Pétrusse and the road towards Esch, to an important industrial site in front of the gates of Luxembourg City.

Soon, the commune attracted industries due to its good infrastructure: the iron industry with Paul Würth from 1891, champagne production with Mercier as well as the tobacco producer Heinz von Landewyck, to name only a few.

Hollerich was a commune in the canton of Luxembourg until 26 March 1920, when it was merged into the city of Luxembourg, along with Hamm and Rollingergrund. At the time of the merger, Hollerich was the third most populous commune in Luxembourg behind Luxembourg City and Esch-sur-Alzette, with a population of 15,402 as of 1916. From 7 April 1914 until the dissolution of the commune, the part of the commune encompassing the urban areas of Hollerich and Bonnevoie was afforded the title of city. The title was not conferred upon all of the commune; the part that was granted the title was officially styled 'Hollerich-Bonnevoie'.

It is also the location of Den Atelier, a music venue.
