= International School of Luxembourg =

Location
- 36, boulevard Pierre Dupong; Hollerich, Luxembourg City, L-1430; Luxembourg; 49.600944°N 6.108333°E

Information
- Other name: ISL
- Former names: DuPont de Nemours Private School; English Speaking School of Luxembourg; American School of Luxembourg; American International School of Luxembourg
- Type: International school Private School
- Established: 1963
- Category: Nursery, Primary and Secondary Education
- Director: Iain Fish
- Grades: PreK-12
- Gender: Mixed
- Age range: 3-18
- Enrolment: ~1,350 (2023—24)
- Colour
- Athletics conference: NECIS, LASEL
- Team name: The Eagles
- Accreditation: International Baccalaureate
- Annual tuition: €19,805-€23,446
- Website: www.islux.lu

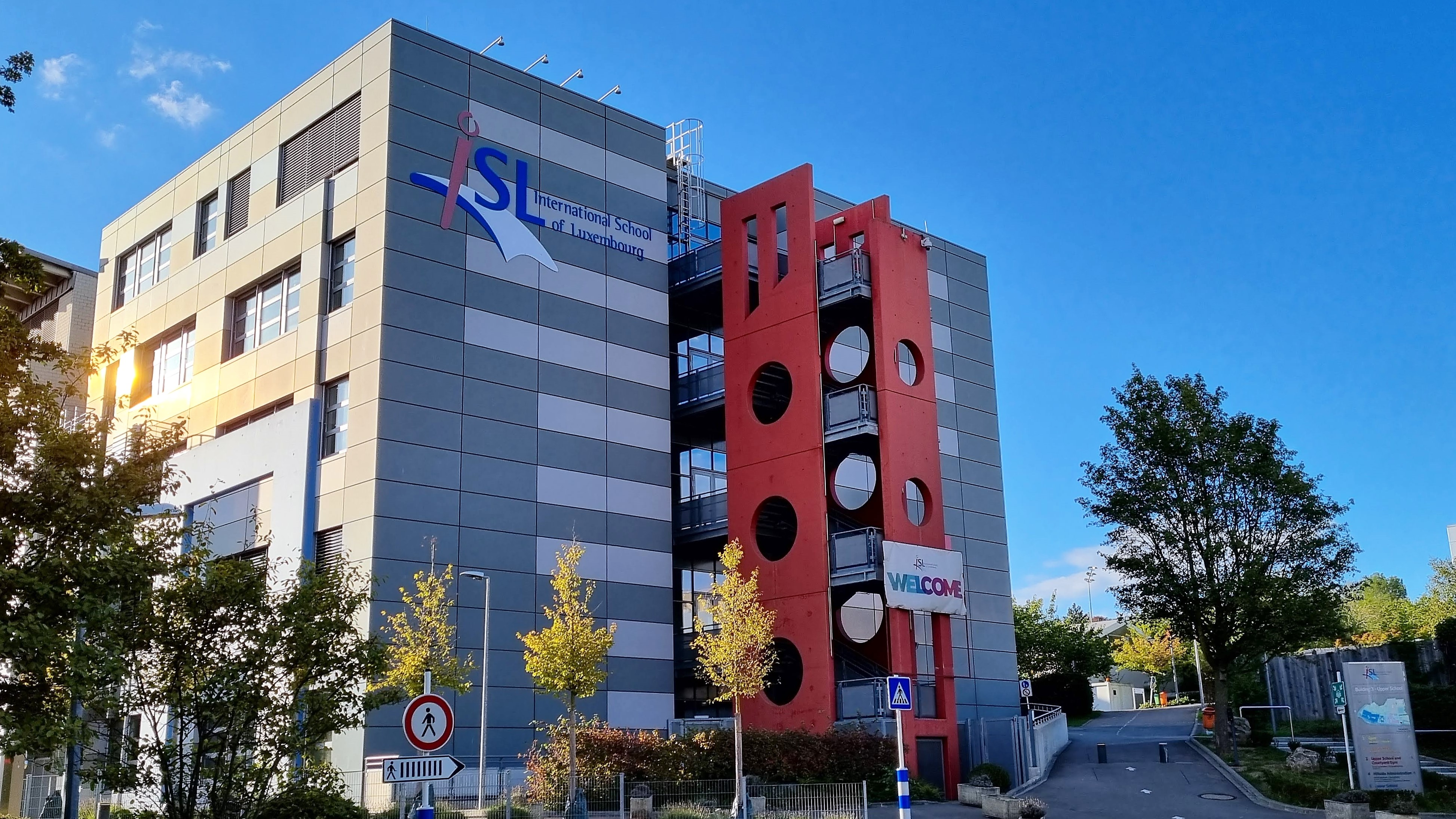
Luxembourg, Geesseknäppchen campus. Building of the “International School of Luxembourg.”

The International School of Luxembourg (ISL) is a privately owned non-profit international school located in Hollerich, Luxembourg City, in southern Luxembourg.

== History ==
The school was founded in 1963 under the name DuPont de Nemours Private School. As part of a deal with the Luxembourg government to open Europe's first polyester film plant in the country the American conglomerate DuPont requested that its employees have access to an American-style education for their children. Classes were first located in the dining room of a private home in Strassen, before moving, in early 1963, to a single classroom at a primary school in Cessange. Soon after, the Luxembourg government offered to the school classrooms at Servais House at the junction of Avenue Maria-Teresa and Boulevard Joseph II, where the school remained for six years.

Seeing the school as a draw for other international firms, the Luxembourg government continued to support its development. In 1969, it gave the school access to a new building on rue Aloyse Kayser, in Belair. The same year it was taken over by international firm Goodyear and renamed the English Speaking School of Luxembourg.

In 1972, with student numbers growing, the school moved to the premises of the Lycée Michel Rodange in Hollerich, where it took the name the American School of Luxembourg and became a not-for-profit organisation. From 1977 to 1999 the school was located at 188 Avenue de la Faiencerie in Limpertsberg, where it adopted the name, the American International School of Luxembourg.

In 1999, the school settled into its current purpose built location in Hollerich on the Campus Geesseknäppchen, which hosts several other Luxembourg-based educational establishments. That same year the school adopted its present name, the International School of Luxembourg.

== Structure and student body ==
The school is divided into a lower school and upper school.

The lower school consists of an Early Years Programme serving children aged 3–7, which includes the Preschool, Kindergarten and Grade 1, whilst the rest of the lower school programme serves ages 7–11 in Grades 2-5.

The upper school consists of a middle school of Grades 6-8, serving ages 11–14, and a high school comprising Grades 9-12 serving ages 14–18.

The school follows the International Baccalaureate (IB) curriculum, including the Middle Years Programme (MYP), and Diploma Programme (DP).

The primary language of instruction is English, with French, German, Spanish, and Luxembourgish also taught.

As of 2023, ISL's student body consists of approximately 1,350 students representing close to 50 nationalities. On average, students remain enrolled in the school for between 3 and 5 years.

== Sports and extracurricular activities ==
ISL is a member of the Northwest European Council of International Schools (NECIS) Sports Council, which coordinates varsity athletics competitions amongst its members. ISL fields teams in volleyball, soccer/football, cross country, basketball, swimming, track and field, tennis, golf, girls soccer/football, and coed softball. The team goes by the name of the Eagles. ISL also fields teams in table tennis and badminton, as part of the Ligue des Associations Sportives Estudiantines Luxembourgeoises (LASEL)

Extracurricular activities include Model United Nations (MUN), Global Issues Network (GIN), drama productions, music ensembles, choirs, and student leadership programs, providing students with opportunities for personal growth and development beyond the classroom.

== Facilities ==
The ISL campus is composed of 4 main buildings: Lower School, Upper School, Hillside Administration, and the Upper School Gym. The campus features modern science laboratories for physics, chemistry, and biology, as well as fully equipped libraries and media centers offering both print and digital resources. Students have access to performing arts spaces, including an auditorium, drama classrooms, and music rooms. Sports facilities include gymnasiums, a football pitch and swimming pool access, while common areas, outdoor play spaces, and a cafeteria support student life and community activities.

== Supplementary programmes ==
Since 1991, ISL has hosted the Japanese Supplementary School in Luxembourg (ルクセンブルグ補習授業校 Rukusenburugu Hoshū Jugyō Kō), a Japanese supplementary school for students aged 6–15.

== Notable alumni ==
- Brian Molko, British-American musician
- Stefan Olsdal, Swedish musician
- Prince Sébastien of Luxembourg, member of the royal family of Luxembourg
- Tali Golergant, Luxembourgish musician
- Monique Olivier, Luxembourgish swimmer and national record-holder

== Notable teachers ==
- Troy Blacklaws, writer and teacher from South Africa
