= Jenny Tough =

Canadian endurance athlete (born 1989/90)

Jenny Tough (born 1989 or 1990) is a Canadian endurance athlete based in Scotland. She has been the first woman in multiple bikepacking races, including the Silk Road Mountain Race in 2021, and the Atlas Mountain Race in 2020. In addition to her bikepacking achievements, Tough is an ultrarunning adventurer who has run solo and unsupported the length of a mountain range on every populated continent. The mountain ranges she has run include the Tien Shan, the Atlas Mountains, the Bolivian Andes, the Southern Alps, the Canadian Rockies, and the Transylvanian Alps. She described these runs in her 2023 book Solo.

In 2022, Tough edited the book Tough Women: Adventure Stories in which twelve women wrote about their adventurous activities, "from mountain climbing to wingsuit flying, from horse trekking to swimming the English Channel".

Tough is deputy editor, also described as contributing editor of adventure travel magazine Sidetracked.

Tough was born in Banff, Alberta, Canada, graduated from James Cook University, and, as of 2023, lives in Edinburgh, Scotland.

== Selected publications ==
- Tough, Jenny, ed. (2020). Tough women adventure stories: stories of grit, courage and determination. London, UK: Summersdale. ISBN 978-1787833005.
- Tough, Jenny (2023). Solo: a true story of spirit, adventure and the life-changing power of running alone. London: Aster. ISBN 978-1783254736.
