= Centre national d'Information pour Jeunes =

National youth information centre of Luxembourg

The Centre national d'Information pour Jeunes (CIJ) is the national youth information centre of Luxembourg.

== History and mission ==
The CIJ and was created in 1987. It was located in the Galerie Kons until the end of 2013, opposite the main railway station in Luxembourg. As of January 2014, the CIJ is located on 87, route de Thionville in 2611 Luxembourg, and is opened to young people, aged 12 to 30, Mondays to Fridays, from 12pm to 5pm. According to the Youth Information Charter, the information will always be provided anonymously, neutrally and free of charge.

The mission of the CIJ is:

1. to provide young people with an objective and dependable information, and by doing so, promoting access to information;
2. to structure the distribution of such information on a national level;
3. to offer a professional service adapted to the needs and requirements of any young person;
4. to promote the autonomy of young people.

== Face-to-face services provided by the CIJ ==
The main activity of the CIJ is youth information, provided either at their centre or during their regular outside activities at fairs, in schools or in youth-houses, and it is generally regrouped under 6 pillars: Studies, Work, Everyday Life, Health, Travel/Sports and Europe/International. Whenever an answer is not known, the team will research it and, if possible, direct the youngster to a more appropriate organisation. Also, the CIJ provides other services such as the European Youth Card, the Teamkaart, reservation services for UCPA, French language training, student job listings, CV and motivational letter assistance, ProJeunes and free onsite access to the Internet and to local Newspapers.

The CIJ also owns a mobile information vehicle, named Infomobile, containing a multimedia-infrastructure and which they use to visit fairs, schools and other youth centers. Onsite youth information can be provided, and activities with young people are offered.

Finally, the CIJ also offers a number of documents, adapted to the needs of young people in Luxembourg.

== Information materials provided by the CIJ up until 2013 ==
Up until 2013, the CIJ provided young people with 4 regular publications for different uses. The Guide des Jeunes summarized all important information that a young person might require at some stage. The same pillars of information could be found here. The last edition was released in February 2010. The Guide Mobilité summarized all possible options that a young person has if he or she wants to travel the world. A special focus was on programs that nurture learning, voluntary services and professional experience. The first and only edition was released in November 2010. The Agenda du CIJ contained useful information for young people and useful contact details. It also contained a yearly schedule for youth that are still at school. Its last edition was September 2013. The Plan de la Ville du CIJ contained a small selection of useful information and a detailed map of Luxembourg-city.

== Information materials provided by the CIJ from 2013 ==
=== Guide du CIJ ===
This guide regroups all pre-existing materials from the Guides Jeunes, Guide Mobilité, Agenda Scolaire and Plan de la Ville. This guide serves as a (school-)agenda and is available free of charge every year in September.

=== Carnets de Liaison ===
In 2012, the CIJ started offering Carnets de Liaison to students in the cycle inférieur of certain public schools in Luxembourg. Students of 30 Schools receive an adapted version of this Carnet at the beginning of each term.

=== SLAM! D'Zeitung fir déi Jonk ===
From January 2014, the CIJ also edits a national Newspaper, called SLAM!. This newspaper, whose objectives it is to accompany young people in the setting up of a newspaper for young people and to teach them the difference between good and poor information, is available on a bi-monthly basis. It can be subscribed to by purchasing a European Youth Card, it can be collected free of charge in any Lycée, at the CIJ and in any Quick in Luxembourg. Of course, all articles are also available online.

== Structure of the CIJ ==
The CIJ has 11 staff members and is composed mainly of youth workers. It is funded by the Ministry of Education and Youth and is partners with several other organisations and institutions such as the Conférence Générale de la Jeunesse and the Service National de la Jeunesse. It is managed by the committee of the Centre Information Jeunes asbl. The CIJ is also member of EYCA and ERYICA.
