= Belair, Luxembourg City =

District of Luxembourg City, Luxembourg

Belair Neumerl
- District
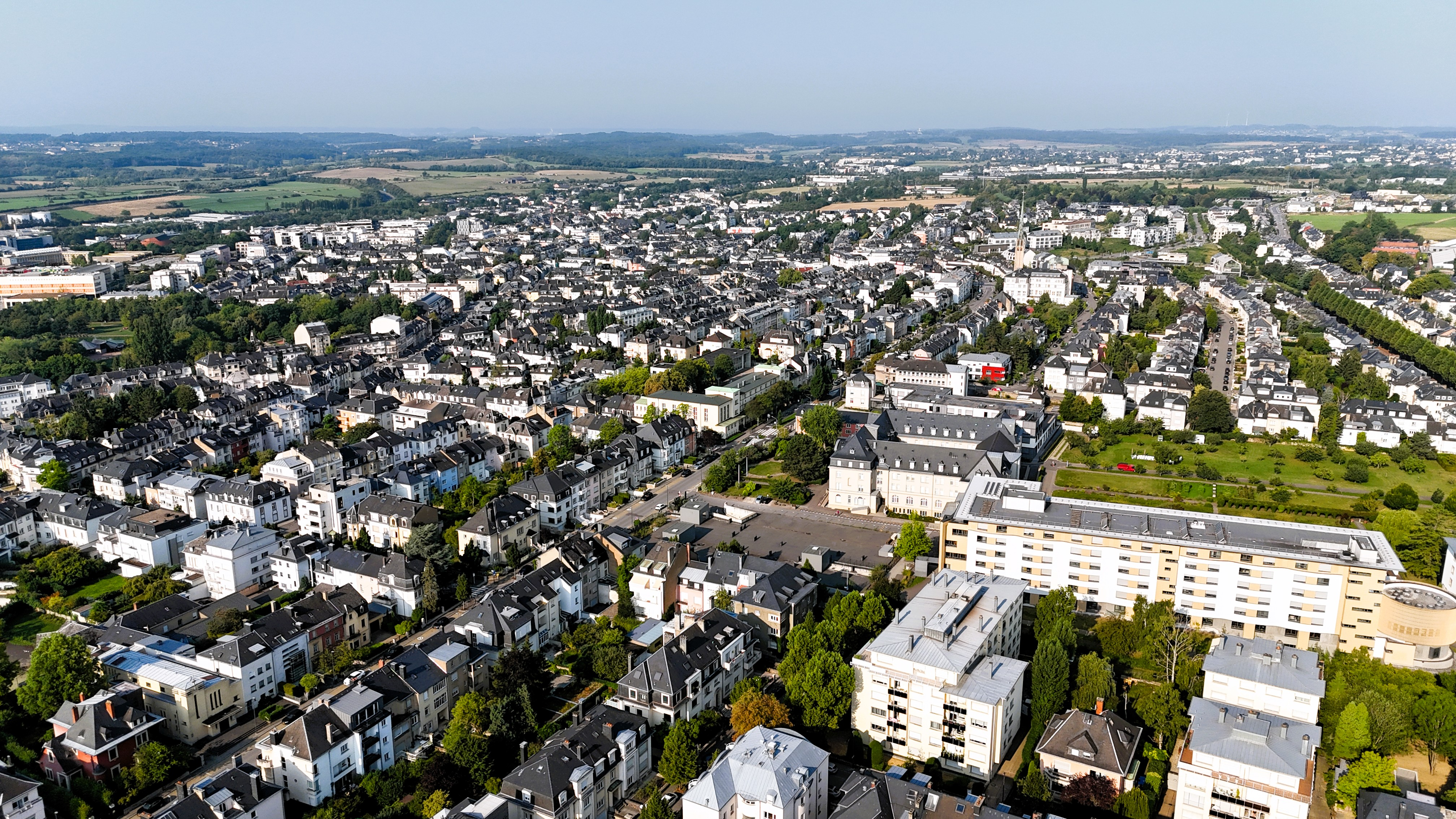

- Belair is one of 24 districts in Luxembourg City
- Country: Luxembourg
- Commune: Luxembourg City

Area
  - Total: 1.718 km^{2} (0.663 sq mi)

Population (31 December 2025)
  - Total: 12,331
  - Density: 7,178/km^{2} (18,590/sq mi)

Nationality
  - Luxembourgish: 33.44%
  - Other: 66.56%
- Website: Belair

Belair (Note: French pronunciation: [bɛlɛʁ]; Luxembourgish pronunciation: [bæˈlɛːɐ̯]; known as Neumerl (Luxembourgish: Neimärel) until 1956) is a district in western Luxembourg City, in southern Luxembourg.

From 1931 to 2021, Belair was the location of Luxembourg's national stadium, rebuilt in 1990, the Stade Josy Barthel, named after Luxembourg's only Olympic gold medal winner. In September 2021, it was officially replaced by the newly built Stade de Luxembourg and is due to be demolished and replaced with a new mixed use neighbourhood named "Wunnquartier Stade".

Luxembourg City's main fire station and the Centre Hospitalier de Luxembourg hospital are based within Belair.

As of 31 December 2025, Belair has a population of 13,331 inhabitants.

== Location ==
The district is bordered in the east by the Boulevard Grande Duchesse Charlotte from the Place de l'Etoile to the Route d'Esch. In the south, it is delimited by the Avenue Guillaume – a section of the Avenue du X Septembre through to the Place de France. The streets Wurth-Paquet and O‘Bradley continue the southern border, while the Rue des Aubépines, and from the junction of this street with the Val Sainte-Croix, the commune border with Strassen, complete Belair's boundary. In the north, the district is divided from Rollingergrund by the Route d'Arlon.

== History ==
During the times when the Fortress of Luxembourg was still occupied, Belair lay within the fortress's exclusion zone, a strip of land outside the fortifications that had to remain undeveloped. Originally fixed at 500 metres from the fortress walls, this area was later increased to 1,000 metres, in the course of the improvements in artillery throughout history. Only approved wooden buildings were permitted, since these could easily and quickly be burned down by the garrison if the need arose. From 1771 no new constructions were allowed here. In 1792/94 the farm estates Daubenfeld and Jungblut (in existence since medieval times), the houses „bey Didlengesch“ (on the Avenue du X Septembre) as well as the chapel of the Holy Cross with a hermitage in the Val Sainte-Croix, were torn down. An unapproved reconstruction of the chapel in 1824 was destroyed in 1839. A cross that was erected in 1984 at the Val Sainte-Croix junction had been constructed in 1833 in a private garden in memory of the chapel.

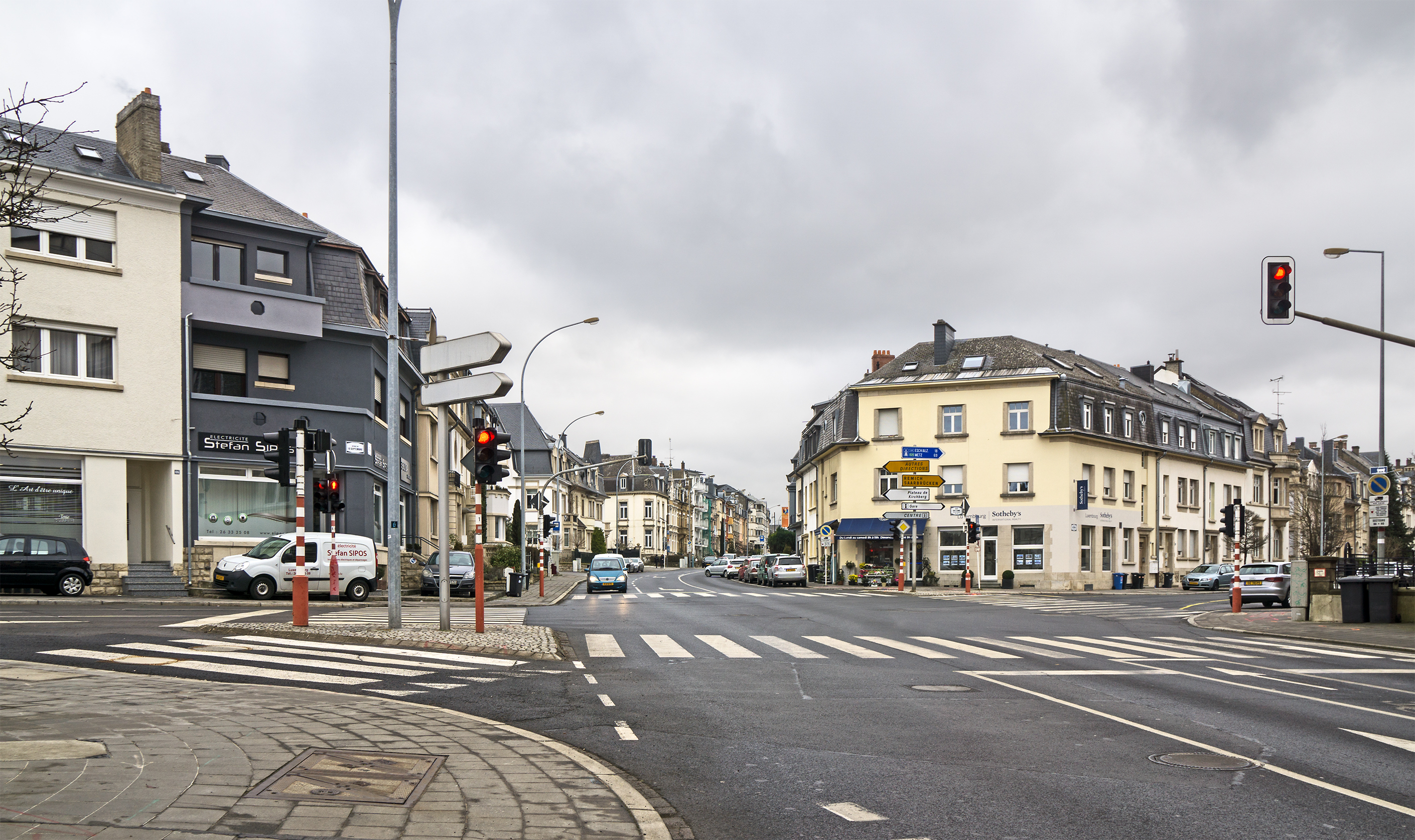
Crossing Avenue Guillaume and Avenue du X Septembre in Belair

The route d'Arlon was built in 1722 in its current location for military reasons. The stretch of the old Roman road from Reims to Trier, which leads through the Val Sainte-Croix, thus became the road to Bertrange.

When Luxembourg became the seat of the European Coal and Steel Community in 1952 and the city's population rose by 4,000 within 5 years, there was also increased pressure to develop new real estate in Belair, a location that was highly suitable for European civil servants to commute to work. From 1951 to 1960, 17 new streets were constructed here. The district which had existed since the 1930s, now expanded its infrastructure. From 1953 to 1957, the parish church was constructed at the western end of the district, according to the plans of Laurent Schmit; this would later become the centre of Belair. Until then, the Chapelle du Christ Roi of the Jesuit Order, constructed in 1931 as designed by Hubert Schumacher, had served as the church of the upcoming district.
