= Limpertsberg =

District of Luxembourg City, Luxembourg

Limpertsberg Lampertsbierg (Luxembourgish)
- District

- Limpertsberg is one of 24 districts in Luxembourg City
- Coordinates: 49°37′15″N 6°07′18″E
- Country: Luxembourg
- Commune: Luxembourg City

Area
  - Total: 1.5707 km^{2} (0.6065 sq mi)

Population (31 December 2025)
  - Total: 11,593
  - Density: 7,380.8/km^{2} (19,116/sq mi)

Nationality
  - Luxembourgish: 29.06%
  - Other: 70.94%
- Website: Limpertsberg

Limpertsberg (Luxembourgish: Lampertsbierg, pronounced [ˈlɑmpɐtsbi̯əɕ]) is a district in north-western Luxembourg City, in the centre of Luxembourg.

As of 31 December 2025, Limpertsberg had a population of about 11,593 inhabitants.

== Overview ==
In the south, on the border with the main city is the Glacis, a large open air parking lot which hosts the annual Schueberfouer fair, the largest fair in the country. Next to the Glacis is the Grand Théâtre de Luxembourg.

Limpertsberg's Notre-Dame Cemetery has a Monument de la résistance et de la déportation (Monument of the national resistance and deportation). The cemetery features the bronze sculpture of The Political Prisoner by Luxembourg's best-known sculptor Lucien Wercollier. The Limpertsberg bronze is one of three casts of the sculpture, with the other two at the Musée national de la résistance (National Resistance Museum) in Esch-sur-Alzette and the National Monument to the Resistance and to the Deportation at Notre-Dame cemetery in Luxembourg City.

To the south east is another iconic landmark, the Grand Duchess Charlotte Bridge, also known as the Red Bridge due to its colour. It connects Limpertsberg to the European district of Kirchberg, passing over the City district of Pfaffenthal and the Alzette river.

Limpertsberg also has several educational institutions such as, parts of the University of Luxembourg, the Lycée de garçons (LGL), the Lycée Robert Schuman, the Lycée Vauban, the Lycée Technique des Arts et Métiers, the Lycée Technique du Centre, the Lycée Technique Michel Lucius, the French school as well as the Waldorf school.

The district also houses St Joseph's Roman Catholic church completed in the Neo-Romanesque style in 1913.

== History ==
In the Middle Ages, the area of the current Limpertsberg district had a forest. John the Blind, King of Bohemia and Count of Luxembourg, mentioned a new mill "under the forest Lymperich" in a legal document in 1314, the first historical mention of Limpertsberg. A 1411 agreement between Wenceslas II and an alderman similarly refers to Limpertsberg as being a wooded area.

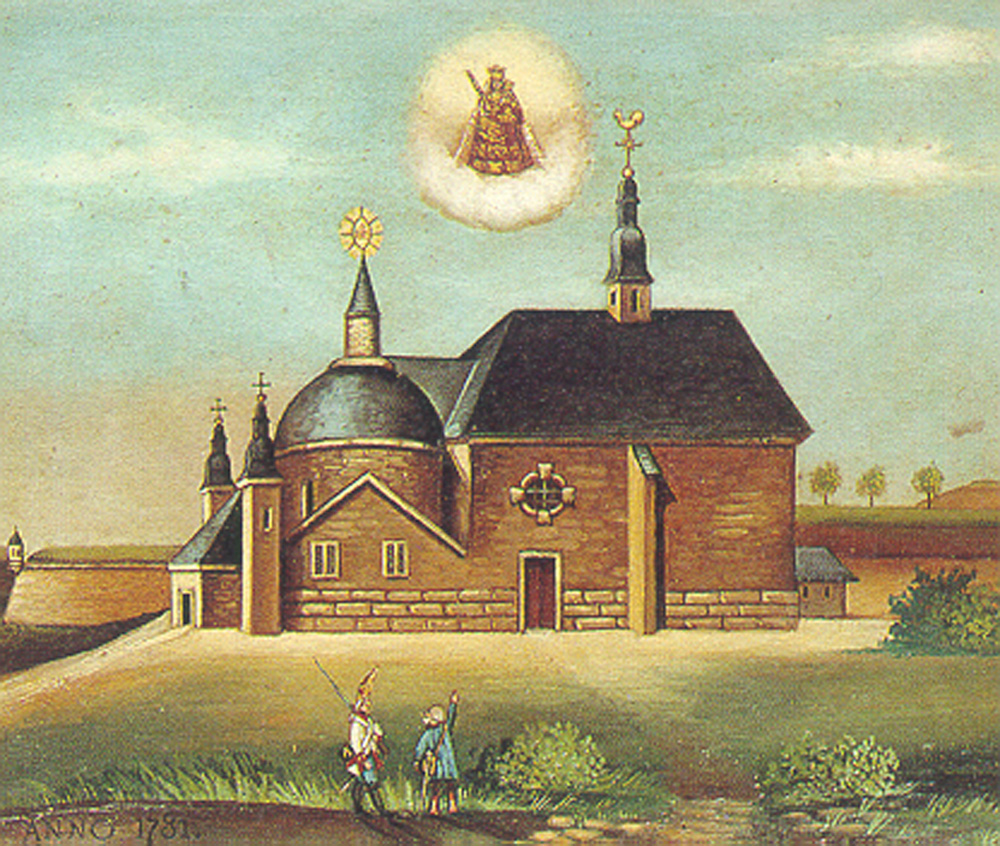
The former Chapelle Notre-Dame on the Glacis (Limpertsberg) destroyed in 1796 by the French army

During the time of the fortress, Limpertsberg was predominantly agricultural in nature, its plateau's image being marked by fields and gardens. The fortress's regulations forbade any significant construction on the land in front of the fortifications. The Prussian law of 1827/28 for the lower Limpertsberg area only permitted light wooden buildings. However, the most important building of modern Limpertsberg had by then long since ceased to exist.

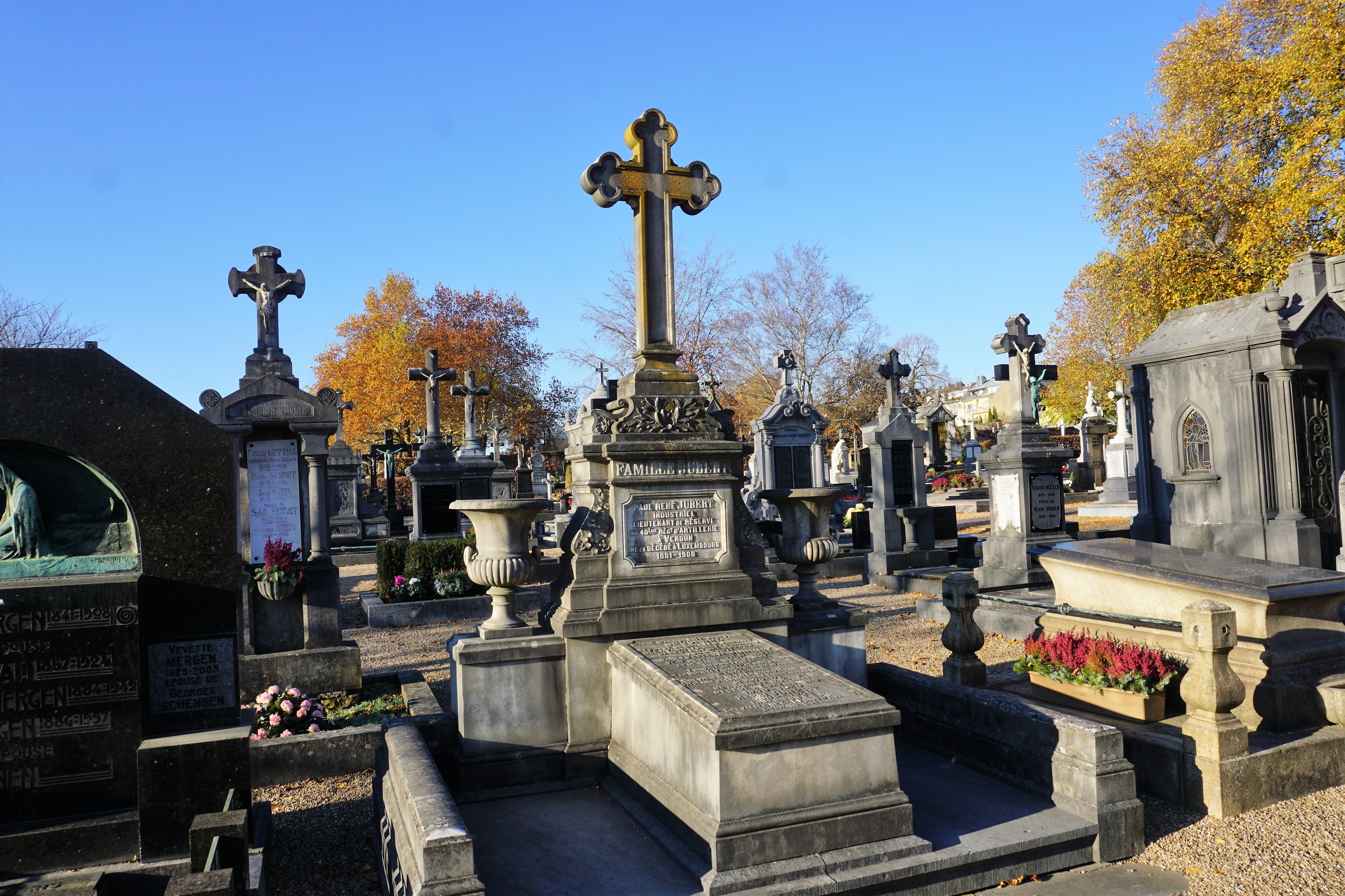
Notre-Dame Cemetery, Limpertsbierg

The chapel of Notre-Dame at the crossing between the current Avenue de la Faiencerie and the Allée Scheffer had been constructed from 1624 to 1627 at the instigation of the Jesuit priest Jakob Brocquart, and was generously endowed by several rich urban nobles and citizens. Within a short amount of time, this chapel, with the statue of Mary the Comforter of the Afflicted, developed into the central Marian shrine of Luxembourg, meaning that it had to be expanded already in 1640. The shrine to the Virgin Mary was torn down in 1796 by French Revolutionary troops; only a year previously, it had been turned into a garrison slaughterhouse. Today, a bronze memorial plaque donated by the Lampertsbierger Syndikat in 1935 and designed by local artist Michel Haagen, serves as a reminder of the former "Glaciskapelle" ("Glacis chapel"). (Note: Located initially on a building opposite the Kleppelkrich monument, it was moved to its current location in 1983) In 1691, the chapel cemetery (Kapellekiirfecht) had been inaugurated behind the chapel, which gradually developed into the present-day Notre-Dame Cemetery, especially since 1778 when the city parish church of St. Nicholas was dismantled and the city's main cemetery was relocated to Notre-Dame. Although the official name for this is the "Cimetière Notre-Dame", in common parlance the name "Niklooskiirfecht" is still used today. Near the cemetery, 7 rebels of the Kleppelkrich were executed by firing squad on 8 January 1799. Their leader Michel Pintz was executed on 20 May of the same year by guillotine. A commemorative stone serves as a reminder of this event, made by Edmond Lux, and installed in front of the cemetery in 1974 at the instigation of the publisher François Mersch. The new Glacis chapel, endowed by Bishop Nicolas Adames and designed by the state architect Charles Arendt, was completed in 1885. In the first years of the 20th century, it temporarily served as a parish church to the rapidly increasing population of Limpertsberg.

By necessity, Limpertsberg could not begin its actual development into a residential and education district until after the dismantlement of the fortress from 1867. Only few houses or residents of Limpertsberg are mentioned historically in the era of the fortress. The siege map of 1795 does not mention one single house on the whole plateau. For strategic reasons, all the arable soil had been carried away from the current Glacis during 1745- 48; the goal here was to deprive an attacking force of the opportunity to entrench in front of the fortress, as the French troops under Vauban and Créquy had done in 1684.
