= Lycée Vauban (Luxembourg) =

Secondary school in Luxembourg

Coordinates: 49.584162°N 6.125661°E

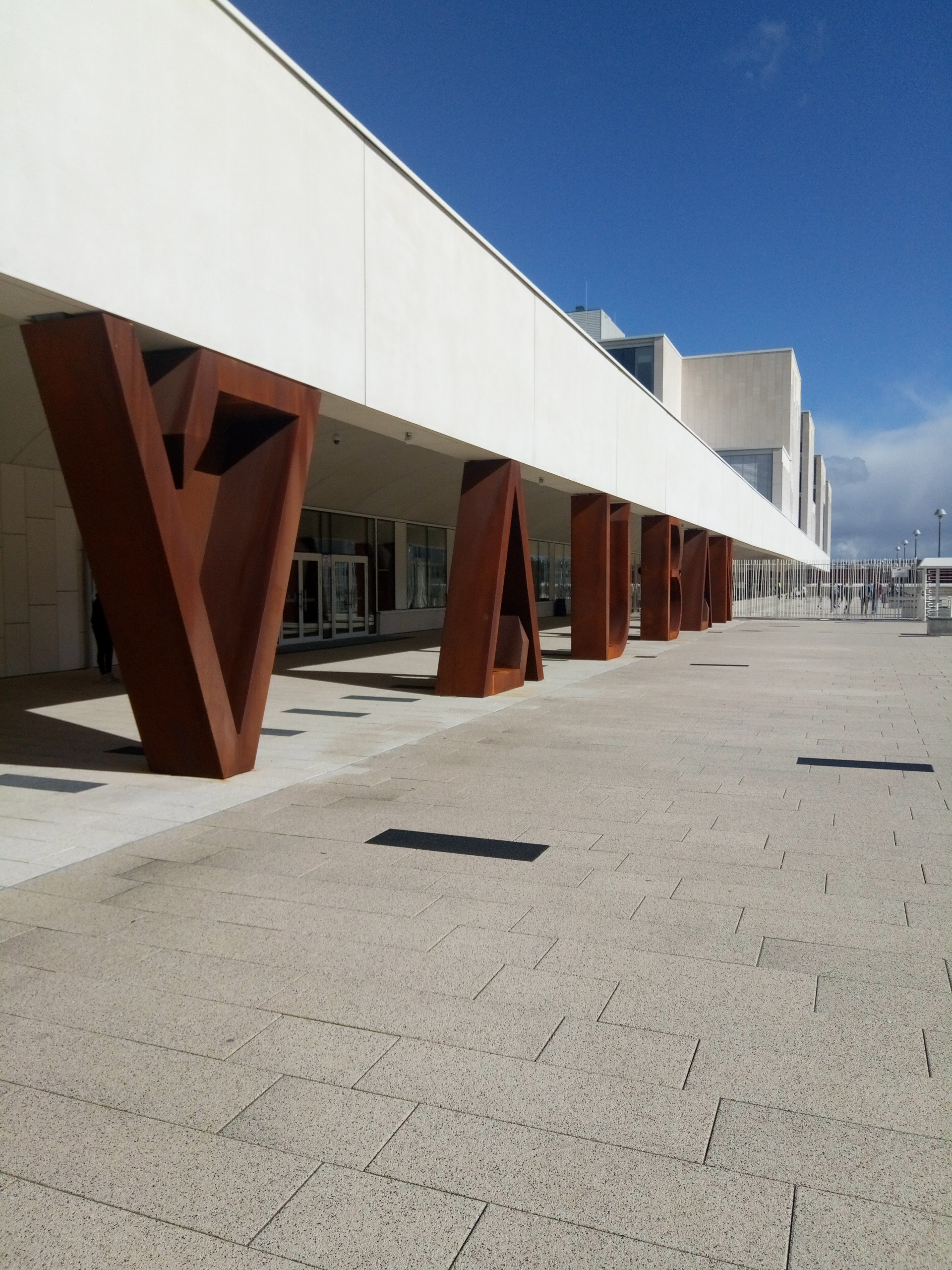
Lycée Vauban

Lycée Vauban is a French High School located in Gasperich, a district of Luxembourg City, in southern Luxembourg.

== History ==
The school was founded in 1985 by French expatriates in Luxembourg, finding the teaching system in Luxembourg inadequate for their children. It was named after Sébastien Le Prestre de Vauban, a French architect who updated Luxembourg City's fortifications under the occupation of Louis XIV. The school grew year by year, teaching pupils of many nationalities. As a result, it has become a cosmopolitan high school, even if lessons are in French. In the early 2000s the government of Luxembourg increasingly subsidized the lycée, therefore, tuition fees have been curbed substantially, consequently more and more pupils can afford attending Lycée Vauban.

Notable alumni of the school include Princess Alexandra of Luxembourg.
