= Operations Manna, Chowhound, and Faust =

1945 humanitarian food drops over the German-occupied Netherlands by the Allies

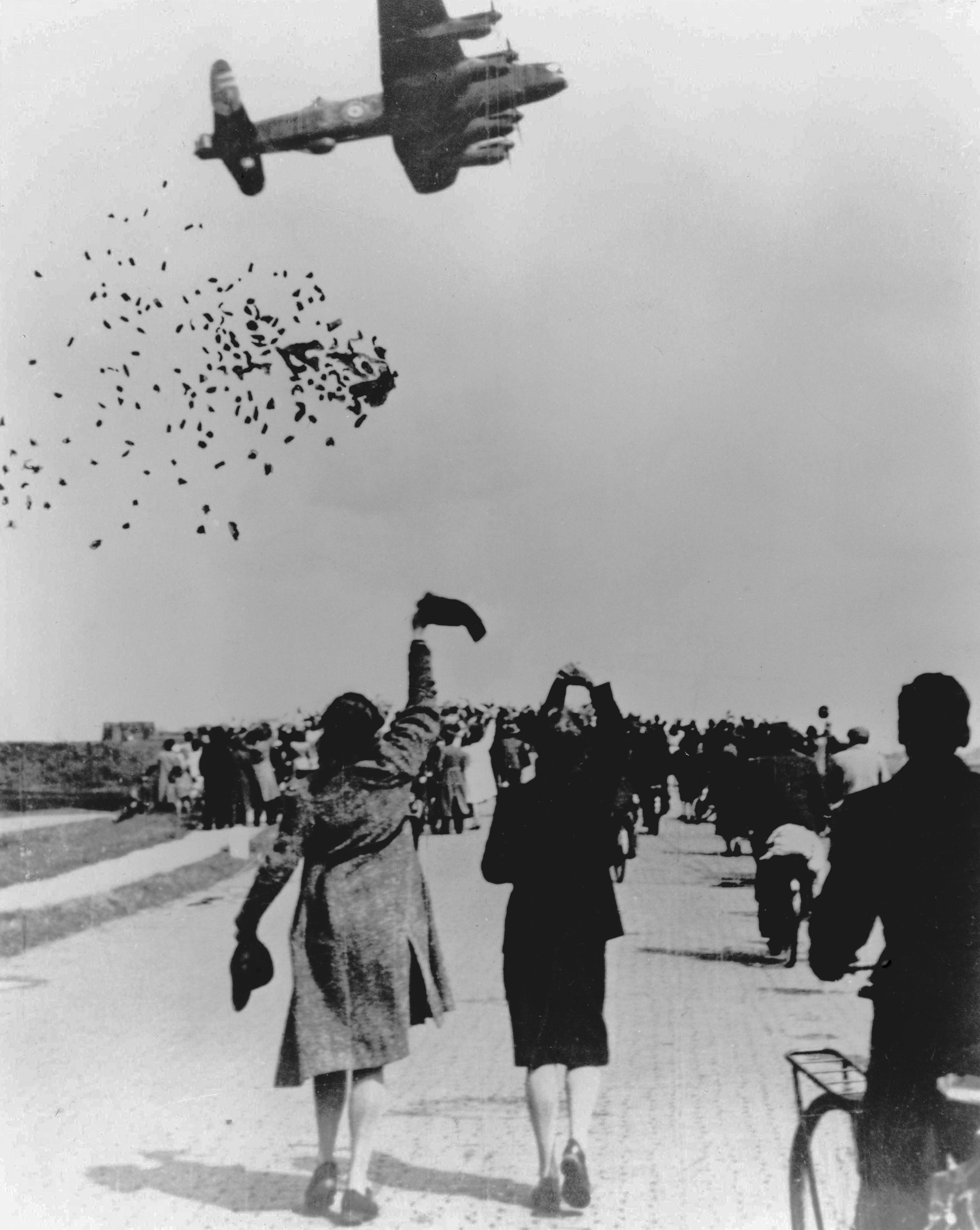
An Avro Lancaster with a food drop over Ypenburg during Operation Manna

Operations Manna, Chowhound and Faust provided food to relieve a famine in the 1944–1945 German-occupied Netherlands. By May 1945, about 20,000 people in the Netherlands had died of starvation and three million were surviving on an ever-diminishing supply of food. The main area impacted by the famine encompassed the large cities in the west. The operations were undertaken by Allied air and ground forces in the last ten days of World War II. A truce with the German occupiers permitted the relief operation to be carried out.

Manna (29 April – 7 May 1945), air-dropped 7,000 tonnes of food into the Nazi-occupied western part of the Netherlands. The operation was carried out by British Royal Air Force (RAF) units and squadrons from the Royal Australian Air Force (RAAF), Royal Canadian Air Force (RCAF), Royal New Zealand Air Force (RNZAF) and Polish Air Force squadrons in the RAF. Chowhound (1–8 May 1945) dropped 4,000 tonnes of food and was accomplished by the United States Army Air Forces. Faust (2–9 May 1945) was a ground operation carried out by the Canadian army which delivered 7,000 tons of food. In total, 18,000 tonnes of food were air dropped or trucked into the occupied Netherlands over 11 days. The war ended in the Netherlands with the 8 May overall surrender of Nazi Germany.

Operations Manna, Chowhound, and Faust staved off a more extensive famine in the Netherlands. With the end of the war, the Allies sent additional large quantities of food into the Netherlands to relieve food shortages.

== Background ==
Nazi Germany invaded and occupied the Netherlands in May 1940. The famine began in the occupied Netherlands after the failure of Operation Market Garden (17–25 September 1944), the Allied offensive in southeastern Netherlands aimed at opening up an invasion route into Germany, and the simultaneous strike by Dutch railway workers. After Market Garden, the Germans temporarily prohibited food from being transported from rural eastern Netherlands to the urbanized and heavily populated western Netherlands. The strike by railway workers, which persisted until the end of the war in May 1945, disrupted the transport of food, especially the potato harvest in fall 1944. These two factors plus a diminished level of food reserves held by the Dutch government, the flooding of much agricultural land by the Germans as a defensive measure, a colder than average winter, the forced export of food and workers from the Netherlands to Germany, and Allied bombing contributed to the severity of the famine.

Most of the hardships during the famine were suffered by the urban population (2.6 million people) in the western Netherlands. Deaths are estimated at about 20,000. At its lowest, the daily ration provided by the Dutch government was two slices of bread and one pint of watery soup per person. The British and American allies were initially reluctant to respond to Dutch requests to send food because they feared the food would fall into German hands. Sweden and Switzerland, neutral countries, and the Red Cross (ICRC) sent shiploads of food to the Netherlands from February to April 1945 and added an additional 200 to 400 kilocalories (800–1,700 kilojoules) of food energy daily to the diet of the residents in the cities, but that was far from sufficient to relieve the famine. The official ration was supplemented by a black market and "food trekkers" journeying on foot or by bicycle to the countryside to buy or trade for food.

In April 1945, with the surrender of Germany on the near horizon, negotiations between the Germans and Dutch officials resulted in an agreement to request air drops of food by the Allied air forces and for food to enter the Netherlands via military trucks. Remaining in German control was the area west of the Grebbe Line where the four largest cities of the Netherlands were: Amsterdam, Rotterdam, The Hague, and Utrecht. The situation in those cities at the end of April was near catastrophic with official rations amounting to only 364 kilocalories (1,520 kilojoules) daily. On 1 May, Dutch food officials in the German-occupied part of the Netherlands said they had no more food to distribute.

The negotiations also resulted in a local truce between the advancing Allied armies (mostly Canadian) and the Germans. The Allies feared that as a defensive measure the Germans might destroy the dikes holding back the Atlantic Ocean and flood much of the Netherlands. Twenty-six percent of the Netherlands is below sea level. Eisenhower sent a warning to the German military commander that he "would be punished if the Germans intensifed Dutch suffering."

The German army in the Netherlands surrendered to the Allies on 5 May 1945. World War II in Europe ended on 8 May when Germany surrendered.

=== Negotiations ===
On 2 April 1945, German Reichskommissar Arthur Seyss-Inquart told Dutch food officials that he was willing to negotiate a truce in the western Netherlands to permit entry of food into the German-occupied Netherlands. On 12 April, Seyss-Inquart agreed with the Dutch that if Allied forces halted at the Grebbe Line and ceased military operations in the Netherlands, he would support an Allied effort to send food aid to Netherlands territory still occupied by the Germans. Dutch Prime Minister in exile Pieter Sjoerds Gerbrandy briefed British Prime Minister Winston Churchill and Prince Bernhard briefed Allied Supreme Commander Dwight Eisenhower on the opportunity to aid the starving urban Dutch population. On 23 April, Eisenhower was authorized by the U.S. and British governments to begin planning a relief operation. Eisenhower had already tasked Air Commodore Andrew Geddes with planning.

On 26 April Seyss-Inquart agreed with Dutch authorities to permit air drops of food. On 27 April Seyss-Inquart met with British military authorities and on 30 April with Eisenhower's deputy Bedell Smith. The discussions led to an agreement that Allied planes would be permitted to fly in designated corridors without being fired upon by the Germans and that food could be dropped in 10 designated drop zones without interference from the Germans.

=== Planning ===
Tasked with planning, British officer Andrew Geddes first decided that air dropping would be the best method of delivery. Not enough parachutes were available for each parcel however and airplanes couldn't land safely in the Netherlands because the Allies had bombed all the airstrips. They also worried that the planes and crewmen might be taken captive by the Germans if they landed. Geddes experimented with trial drops of sand bags and found that the bags burst hitting the ground when dropped from an altitude of 500 ft (150 m), but that drops at slow speed from 400 ft (120 m) were successful. The low altitude of the drops dictated daytime operations only.

Coordination with the occupying Germans was necessary to designate flight corridors and drop zones to preclude the Germans firing on the aircraft bearing food. The Germans feared that the Allies might use the aid drops as a cover for a military attack. On 26 April Geddes and British general Freddie de Guingand met with German officers in Achterveld, a village in the Canadian-conquered part of the Netherlands. The officers agreed on air corridors, drop zones, and other details, although the German officers did not have the authority to approve the operation. That decision was pushed up to Seyss-Inquart.

== Operations ==
=== Manna ===
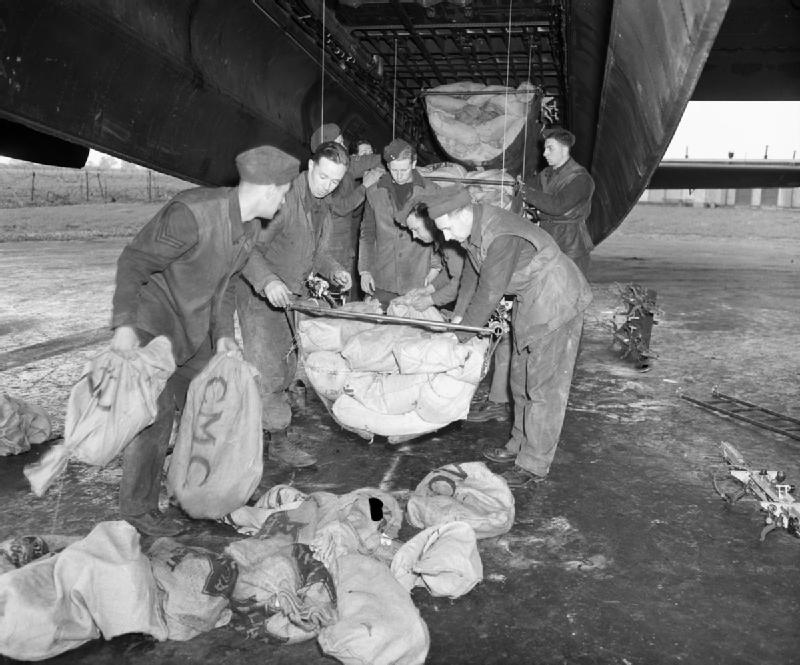
RAF ground crew loading food supplies into slings for hoisting into the bomb bay of an Avro Lancaster heavy bomber of 514 Squadron (1945).

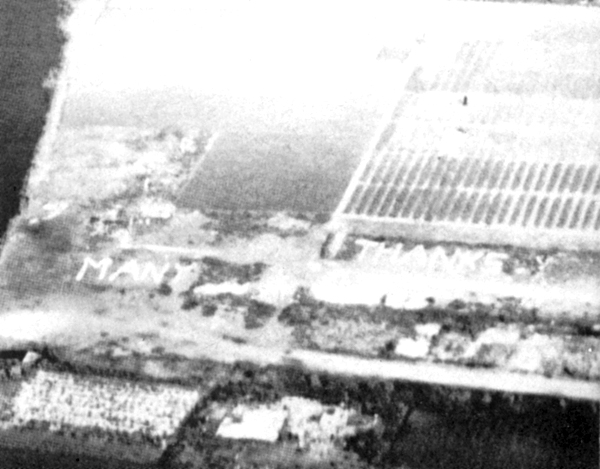
Many Thanks spelt-out on the ground in tulips for Operations Manna and Chowhound.

Operation Manna was the British operation, named after the miraculous food described in the Bible. On April 29, despite the fact that the Germans had not yet formally agreed to a ceasefire (Seyss-Inquart would do so the next day), Geddes undertook a test flight to see if the Germans would adhere to the tentative agreement not to shoot at Allied aircraft bearing food. On that morning, two RAF Avro Lancasters carrying food instead of bombs flew to the Netherlands, dropped the food at a racetrack near The Hague, and returned safely to Britain after an operation that lasted only a little more than two hours. With that success, the BBC announced that hundreds of British military aircraft would drop food at six designated drop zones that afternoon. Two hundred forty Lancasters dropped 526 tons of food that day. The Lancasters flew at very low altitudes with German guns pointed at them. The Germans had laid out bed-sheets to identify drop zones. German intelligence personnel stood by to check the food bags as they landed to ensure that no weapons were dropped. Tens of thousands of Dutch citizens descended upon the drop zones. Despite the risk of chaos as hungry people rushed to the drop zones, the reception of the food drops was well organized. Geddes had called on Prince Bernhard, commander of the Dutch army, to organize Dutch reception and distribution committees.

John Funnell, a navigator on the operation, says the first items dropped were tinned food, dried food and chocolate.

At the briefing we were told that a truce had not been negotiated but a broadcast had been made to the Germans telling of our mission, and giving details of our route, height, speed, and destination with a request that we should not be harmed. As we arrived people had gathered already and were waving flags, making signs, etc., doing whatever they could. It was a marvellous sight. The idea was we would cross the Dutch border at 1,000 feet, and then drop down to 500 feet at 90 knots which was just above stalling speed...There was no truce at that point, and as we crossed the coast, we could see the anti-aircraft guns following us about. We were then meant to rise up to 1,000 feet, but because of the anti-aircraft guns we went down to rooftop level. By the time they sighted on us, we were out of sight. A lot of people were surprised we went without armaments...

From April 29 and continuing until May 8, Operation Manna consisted of 3,301 sorties and the dropping of 7,142 tons of food to six locations. The operation was carried out by British, Australian, Canadian, New Zealand, and Polish war planes and crew--plus one Dutchman who piloted a Lancaster. The drop zones were: Katwijk (Valkenburg airfield), The Hague (Duindigt horse race course and Ypenburg airfield), Rotterdam (Waalhaven airfield and Kralingse Plas) and Gouda. The initial drops included military combat rations, but contents became single-item boxes and sacks of flour, tinned meat, sugar, coffee, peas, chocolate and dried eggs.

=== Chowhound ===
The American operation was delayed by poor weather at U.S. bases in Britain but began on 1 May. Between that day and 8 May, ten bomb groups of the US Third Air Division flew 2,268 sorties, delivering a total of 3,770 tons. Four hundred B-17 Flying Fortress bombers of the United States Army Air Forces dropped 800 tons of K-rations during 1 to 3 May on Amsterdam Schiphol Airport. Each box of K-rations weighed 41 lb (19 kg) to 43 lb (20 kg) and represented a threat to civilians on the ground who might be hit by falling boxes. German troops on the ground, against or unaware of orders to hold their fire, sometimes shot at the low-altitude aircraft, but little damage was done.

On 1 May 1945, Valkenburg airfield near Leiden was the drop zone for some of the B-17s. Gunner Bernie Behrman of the 390th Bomb Group described his experience of the flight:

The purpose of the mission was Valkenburg airbase. We had no trouble finding the field. There was no anti-aircraft resistance. As I turned for the drop, I could see German soldiers on watch. We dropped the food. Some packages got stuck on the attachment points, but that was no problem. We closed the bomb doors and returned home with a good feeling. The crew on board was a war crew who had a part in blowing things up. After all those destruction flights, we had a very good feeling about this mission. I think the bombers flying low over the drop zones at 150 to 175 knots must have boosted the morale of the people on the ground.

Operation Chowhound set a precedent and a model for future airdrop missions, most notably the Berlin Airlift of 1948–1949.

=== Faust ===
The Allied army on the ground in the liberated portion of the Netherlands began stockpiling food for aid to the Dutch while awaiting the opportunity to distribute it at the end of the war or in the areas still controlled by the Germans. Allied stockpiles of food designated for the Netherlands were located in the Netherlands, Belgium, Britain, the U.S., and on board ships and totalled about 158,000 tons. Operation Faust was the initial effort to bring food aid to the Netherlands with ground transportation rather than air.

On 1 May the German army commander and Canadian commander Charles Foulkes agreed on a ceasefire along the road and railroad from Arnhem (in Allied hands) to Utrecht (in German hands). Operation Faust began the next morning when 360 Canadian trucks carrying food crossed into German-controlled territory. An additional 150 trucks later participated in the relief operation. Food delivered from 2 to 9 May totalled 6,913 tons. With the German surrender in the Netherlands on 5 May, food deliveries could enter the formerly occupied part of the Netherlands without hindrance from the Germans and with their help in administering the operation.

== Aftermath ==
The spectacle of hundreds of bombers passing over Dutch cities at low altitudes "incited cheering, waving crowds....Never will Holland forget the spectacle of the endless stream of planes which 'bombarded' our terrorized cities with goods of which we had forgotten the existence." The large-scale distribution of the food to the public by Dutch authorities did not begin until 10 May due to wartime damages which had destroyed much of the transportation network. The variety of the items delivered made sorting difficult in preparing individual food packets for distribution.

The psychological impact of the air drops was substantial although the quantity of food delivered by air drops in relation to the need was small, about three kilograms (6 1/2 pounds) per person in the famine impacted area of the Netherlands. Operation Faust added an additional two kilograms (4 1/2 lb) per person to the food supply. The food shortage was alleviated by the large quantities of food the Allies delivered by land and sea after the German surrender. By the week of 27 May the daily adult ration exceeded 2,000 kilocalories (8,400 kilojoules) per day, an adequate diet for most people.

=== Legacy ===
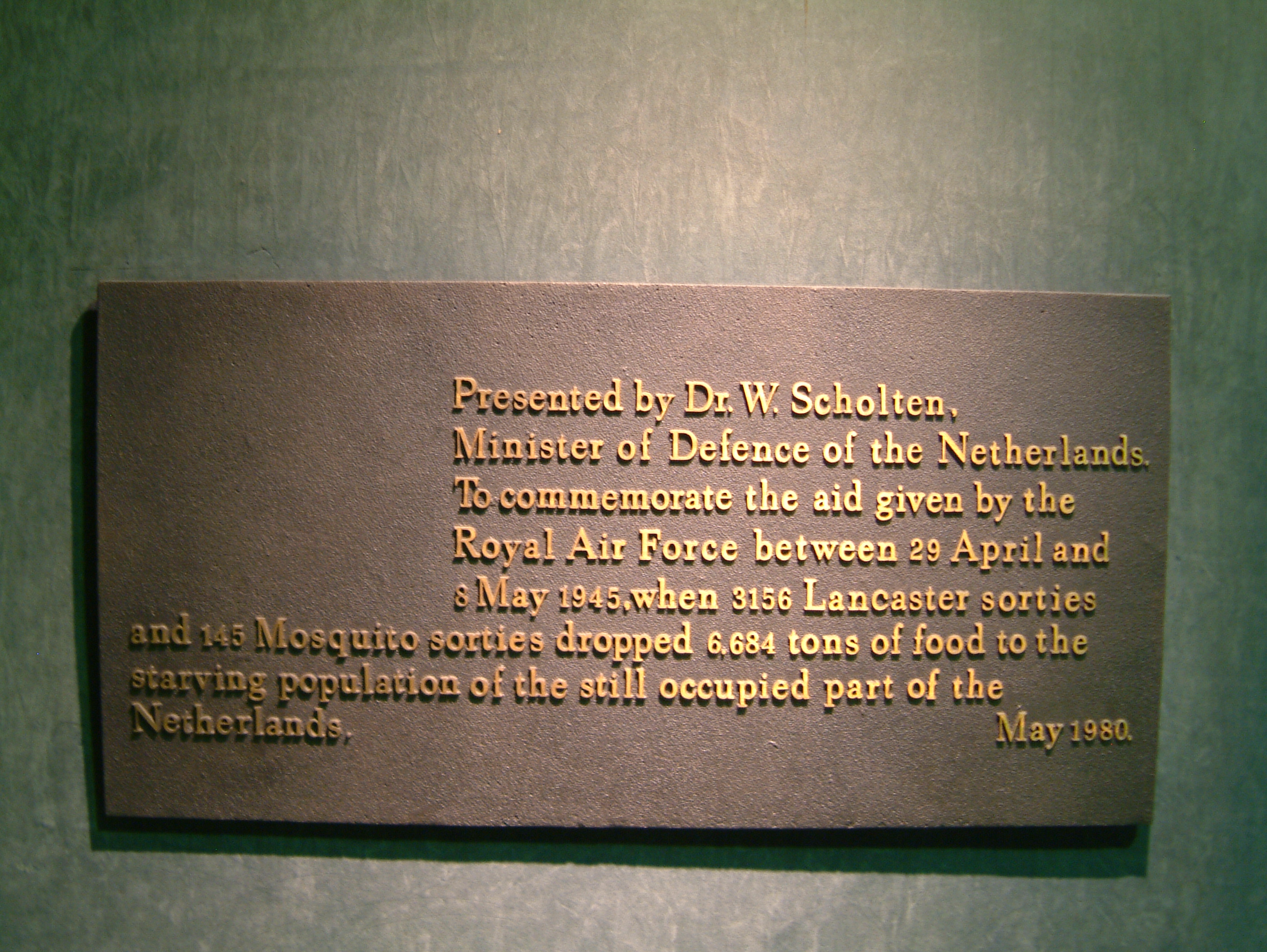
Operation Manna Commemoration Plaque

A commemorative plaque to thank the Royal Air Force for their help in mounting Operation Manna was presented in May 1980 by Dr. Willem Scholten, Minister of Defence of the Netherlands and is displayed in the Royal Air Force Museum, Hendon, England. On 28 April 2007, British Air Commodore Andrew Geddes was honoured when a hiking trail in the Rotterdam district of Terbregge, the Air Commodore Geddespath, was named after him. This path goes past the Manna/Chowhound monument in the noise barrier of the northern highway ring road around Rotterdam. The official unveiling of the plaque was performed by Lieutenant-Commander Angus Geddes RN (Geddes's son) from England and Warrant Officer David Chiverton from Australia (Geddes's grandson).

== In popular culture ==
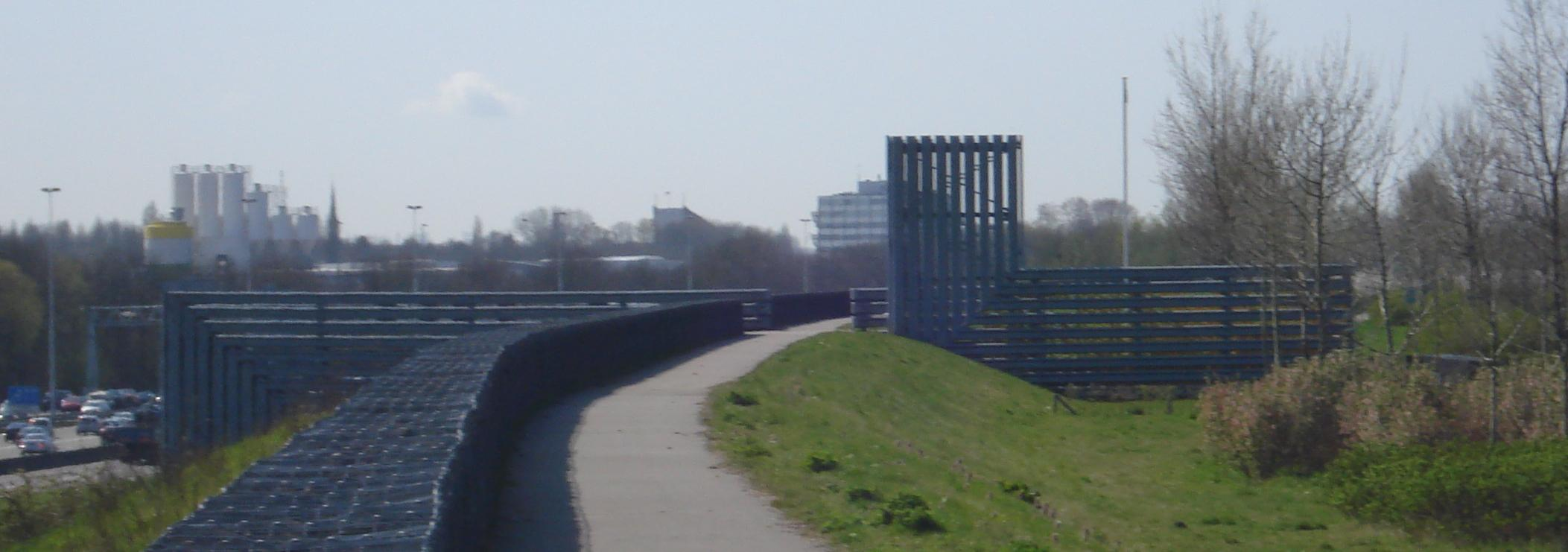
Manna/Chowhound monument ("Monument voor operatie Manna")

Operation Chowhound was featured in episode 9 of Masters of the Air, a television miniseries for Apple TV+ from Steven Spielberg and Tom Hanks.

The flights over Amsterdam dropping food parcels appeared in episode 7 of A Small Light, a UKTV mini series about Miep Gies during WW2.
