= Stella Simons =

Dutch lawyer and feminist

Stella (Estella Carolina) Simons (November 5, 1888 in Amsterdam – January 30, 1989 in Wassenaar) was a Dutch lawyer and feminist. Simons undertook many activities in the field of child protection, care for the poor and feminism. She received recognition through her honorary membership (in 1934) from the UVSV and (in 1954) from the VVAO. Moreover, in 1958 she was appointed Officer in the Order of Orange-Nassau.
