= Dirk Spierenburg =

Dutch politician and diplomat

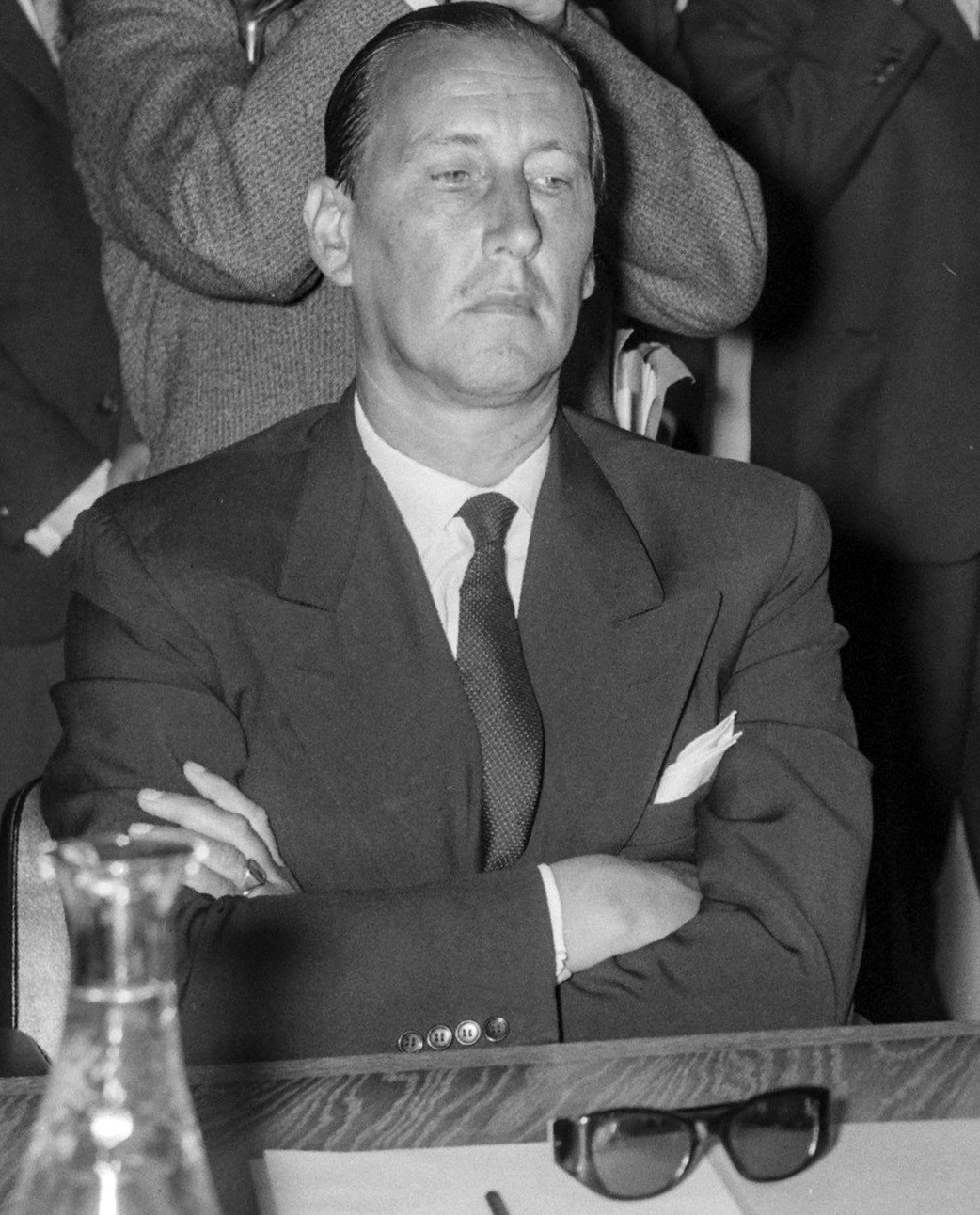
- Spierenburg in 1952

Vice-President of the High Authority of the European Coal and Steel Community
- In office 1957–1962

Member of the High Authority of the European Coal and Steel Community
- In office 1952–1962

Permanent Representative of the Netherlands to the European Communities
- In office 1963–1971

Permanent Representative of the Netherlands to NATO
- In office 1971–1974

Personal details
- Born: Dirk Pieter Spierenburg; 4 February 1909 Rotterdam, Netherlands
- Died: 27 August 2001 (aged 92) Wassenaar, Netherlands

Dirk Pieter Spierenburg (4 February 1909 – 27 August 2001) was a Dutch politician and diplomat, born in Rotterdam.

He was a member of the High Authority of the European Coal and Steel Community, serving in the Monnet Authority from 1952 and was in charge of external relations. He later wrote the Spierenburg report on reform in 1979 of the European Commission which was only partly heeded.

== Publications ==
- with Raymond Poidevin, The History of the High Authority of the European Coal and Steel Community: Supranationality in Operation (1994).
- (chair) Europese Unie. Rapport van de Adviescommissie Europese Unie (1975).
