= Wassenaar =

- Municipality and town
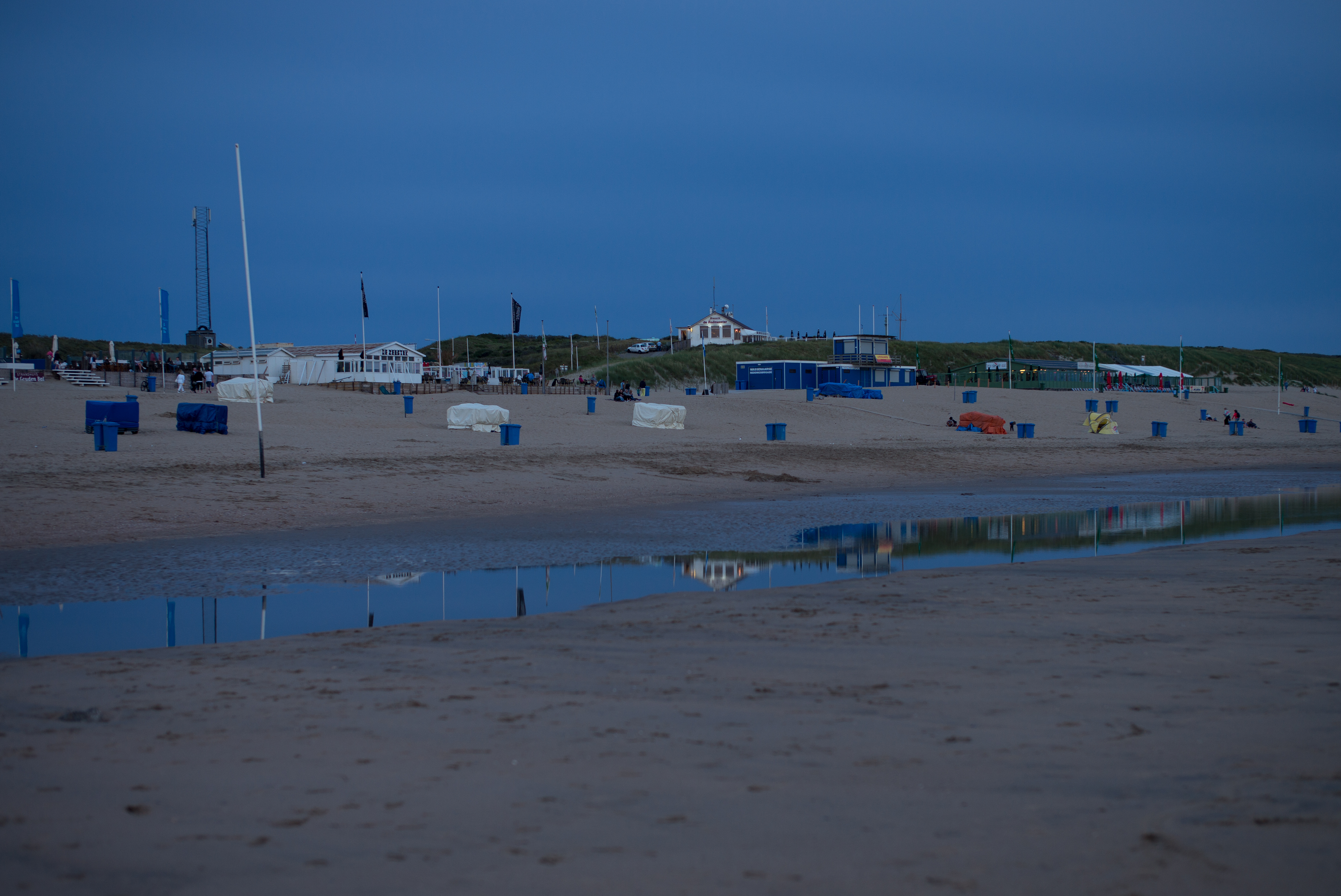
- Beach in Wassenaar after sunset

- Flag Coat of arms

- Location in South Holland
- Coordinates: 52°9′N 4°24′E
- Country: Netherlands
- Province: South Holland

Government
  - Body: Municipal council
  - Mayor: Leendert de Lange (VVD)

Area
  - Total: 62.40 km^{2} (24.09 sq mi)
  - Land: 51.11 km^{2} (19.73 sq mi)
  - Water: 11.29 km^{2} (4.36 sq mi)
- Elevation: 1 m (3.3 ft)

Population (January 2021)
  - Total: 26,949
  - Density: 527/km^{2} (1,360/sq mi)
- Demonym: Wassenaarder
- Time zone: UTC+1 (CET)
  - Summer (DST): UTC+2 (CEST)
- Postcode: 2240–2245
- Area code: 070
- Website: www.wassenaar.nl

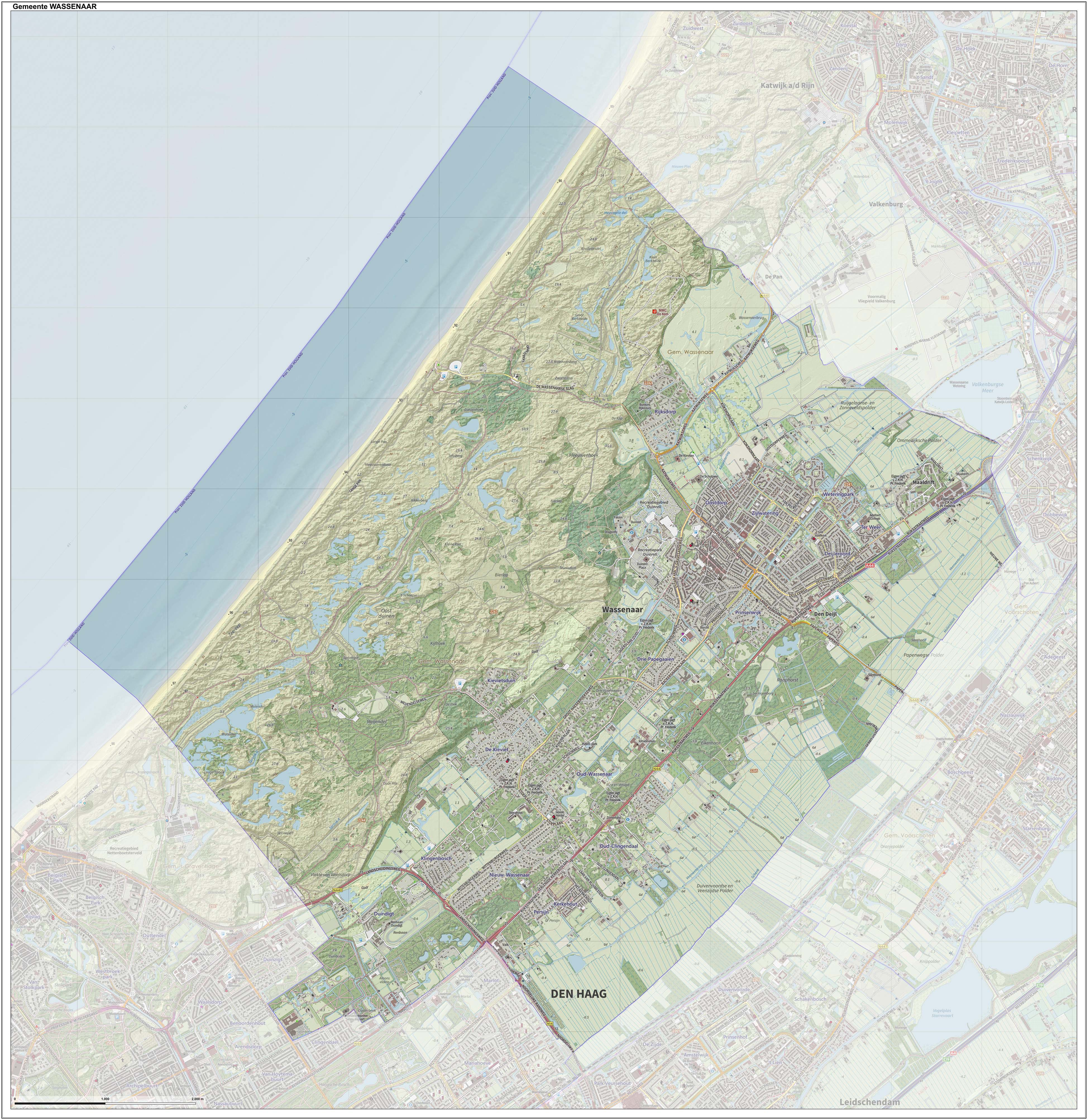
Map of Wassenaar, June 2023

Wassenaar (Dutch pronunciation: [ˈʋɑsənaːr]; population: 26,949 in 2021) is a municipality and town located in the province of South Holland, on the western coast of the Netherlands.

An affluent suburb of The Hague, Wassenaar lies 10 km (6 mi) north of that city on the N44/A44 highway near the North Sea coast. It is part of the Haaglanden region and the Rotterdam–The Hague metropolitan area. The municipality covers an area of 62.40 km^{2} (24.09 sq mi), of which 11.29 km^{2} (4.36 sq mi) is covered by water.

Wassenaar is home to some of the Netherlands' richest residential neighborhoods as well as the country's most expensive street, the Konijnenlaan.

== History ==
By tradition, the 12th-century Romanesque church in Wassenaar is the spot where the Northumbrian missionary Willibrord landed in the Netherlands; the high dunes to the west were not formed until later.

Wassenaar long remained an unremarkable small town, known only as the home of the House of Wassenaer. It only began to gain prominence in the 19th century when Louis Bonaparte ordered the construction of the Heerweg ("Army Road") between The Hague and Leiden, which forms the current Rijksstraatweg. In approximately 1840, Prince Frederik had the De Paauw (Peacock) palace built, where he lived for many years; it now serves as the city hall of Wassenaar.

In 1907 a railway was built, connecting Rotterdam, The Hague, Wassenaar and Scheveningen, the course of which now forms the Landscheidingsweg. Wassenaar became attractive as a residence for wealthy people from Rotterdam. Buildings such as the monumental Huize Ivicke were constructed.

Some remnants of the Atlantic wall are located on Wassenaar's beach, the Wassenaarseslag; nearly a thousand metres of underground walled tunnels are present, connecting five bunkers. The network now serves as a bat sanctuary and is no longer open to visits.

From September 1944 to March 1945 Wassenaar was one of the launch sites used by the German Luftwaffe for the V-2 rockets directed mainly towards London.

The American World War II and Korean War general Haywood Hansell, who helped plan the Allied bombing offensive against both Germany and Japan, lived in Wassenaar in retirement from 1957 to 1966.

In 1982 the Wassenaar Agreement between employers' organisations and trade unions in the Netherlands was signed here. This groundbreaking agreement helped in restraining wage growth in return for the adoption of policies to combat unemployment and inflation.

The Wassenaar Arrangement, a post Cold War era arms control convention, was signed here by forty member nations in May 1996.

=== Modern history ===
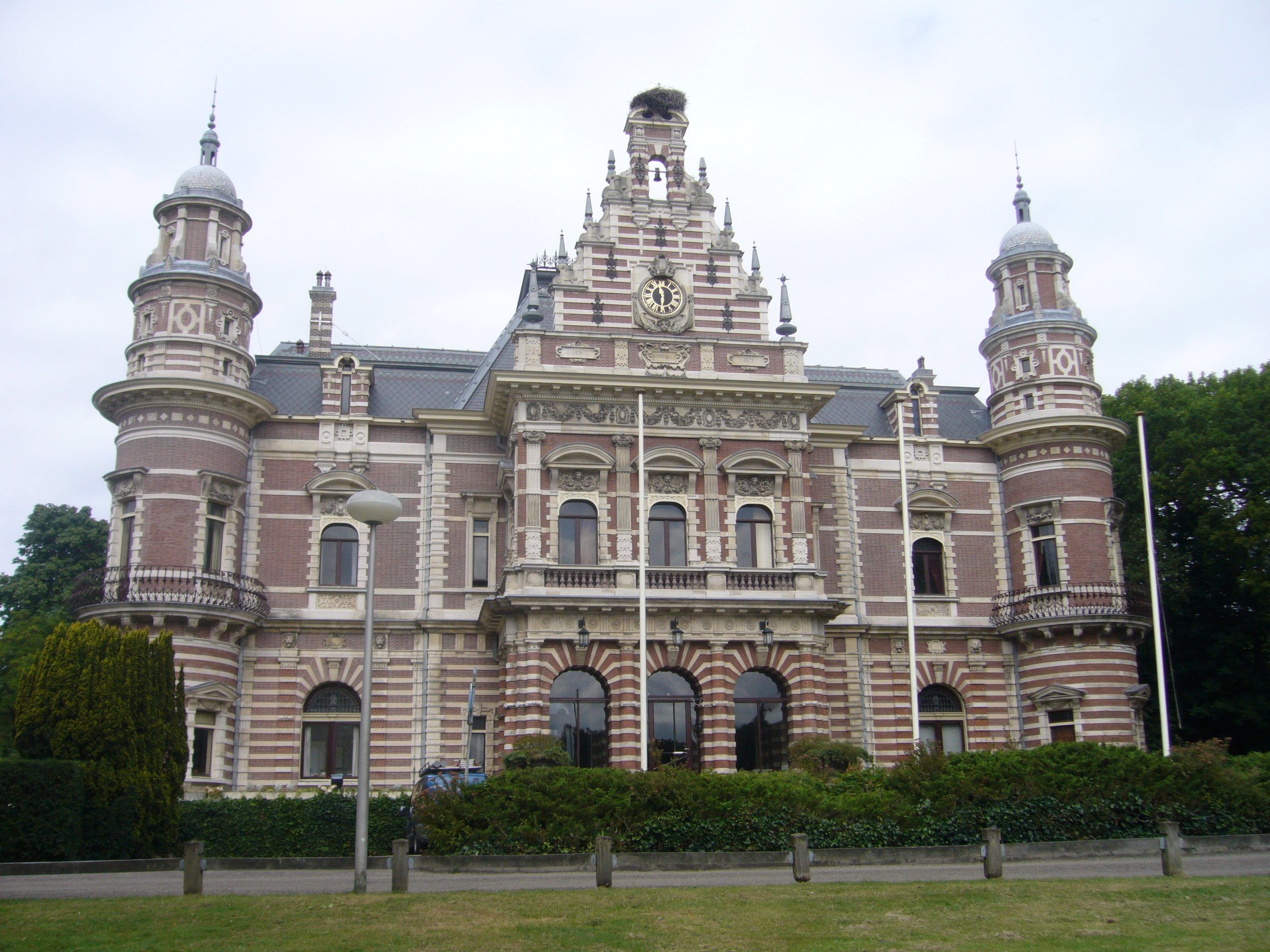
Old Castle of Wassenaar

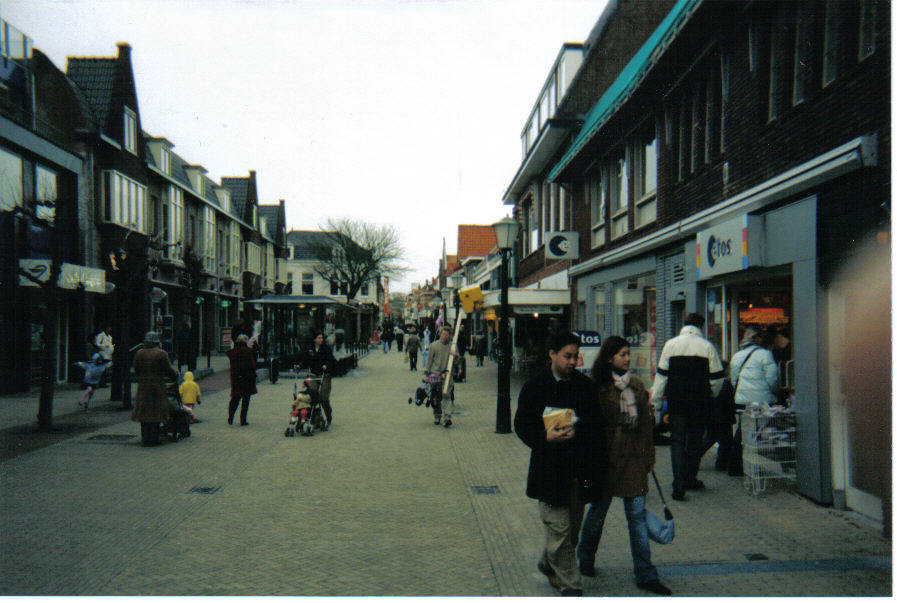
De Langstraat, the main shopping street in Wassenaar

Since the days of Prince Frederik, Wassenaar has often served as an official residence: King Willem-Alexander of the Netherlands, his wife, Queen Máxima, and their daughters lived in the villa Eikenhorst at the estate De Horsten in Wassenaar from 2003 until 2019; Princess Alexia was baptized at the Romanesque church in Wassenaar. The princesses attended the Bloemcampschool in Wassenaar, founded in 1931.

From 1970 until its relocation to Amsterdam in 2016, the Netherlands Institute for Advanced Study (NIAS) which provides research time, space and support for foreign and Dutch scholars, was located in Wassenaar and the Netherlands Institute of International Relations Clingendael, is situated in Huys Clingendael.

The U.S. Embassy The Hague as well as several ambassadorial residences are located here, including those of Canada, South Korea, Indonesia, and Ireland. In general, there is a large expatriate community of diplomats and business people in Wassenaar, largely due to its proximity to both the international organizations and embassies in The Hague. There are several international schools located in Wassenaar, including the American School of The Hague (ASH), and The International School Wassenaar, part of Rijnlands Lyceum Foundation.

Wassenaar has several parks and a network of bicycle paths. Trees, mainly beech, oak, and horse chestnut, are widespread, giving the town a green character. The town centre supports a number of high-end shops, delicatessens and bakeries as well as cafes, bars, and restaurants. There are Football, Field Hockey, Cricket, Rugby, and Tennis clubs. The theme park Duinrell and the race track Duindigt, the only remaining grass race track in the Netherlands, are also here. The art Museum Voorlinden was opened by King Willem-Alexander in 2016.

Despite being a relatively small town, Wassenaar is well known in the Netherlands for its conspicuous wealth. Areas of the town are amongst the most affluent in the Netherlands, and residents have a reputation for being bekakt or posh. Wassenaar is home to some of the most expensive neighbourhoods in the nation. In 2018 the Konijnen laan had an average house price of around 2.5 million Euros, making it the most expensive street in the Netherlands. The Dutch artists Ross and Iba released a song entitled 'Wassenaar,' which poked fun at the wealth of the town.

Wassenaar has always enjoyed good relations with the neighbouring town of Voorschoten, with which it has shared a history. The House of Wassenaer, for example, historically resided in the Kasteel Duivenvoorde in Voorschoten. A merger into one municipality has been discussed.

== Local government ==
The municipal council of Wassenaar consists of 21 seats, which are divided as follows (from the election results of 2026):

- VVD, 8 seats
- Hart voor Wassenaar, 4 seats
- D66, 2 seats
- Lokaal Wassenaar!, 2 seats
- GroenLinks/PvdA, 2 seats
- Forum for Democracy, 1 seat
- Democratische Liberalen Wassenaar (DLW), 1 seat
- CDA, 1 seat

== Culture ==
=== Sports ===
The following annual sports events take place in Wassenaar;

- The Zwemloop Wassenaar, which in 2024 will be organized by the Tri-Team Wassenaar, for the 28th occasion.
- The 15 van Wassenaar, which will be hosting the 10th edition in 2024.

== Notable people from Wassenaar ==
=== Academic and public service ===
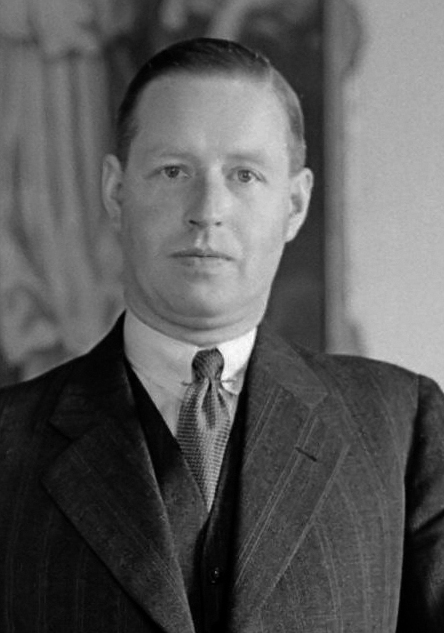
Alidius Tjarda van Starkenborgh Stachouwer, 1935

- Jonkheer Alidius Tjarda van Starkenborgh Stachouwer (1888–1978 in Wassenaar) nobleman and statesman, the last colonial Governor-General of the Netherlands East Indies
- Henk Hofstra (1904–1999 in Wassenaar) politician
- Gerard Helders (1905–2013) politician died in Wassenaar aged 107
- Maurits Kiek (1909–1980) World War II MI9 agent, parachuted into Nazi occupied territory.
- Johan Witteveen (1921–2019 in Wassenaar) retired politician
- Sidney van den Bergh, (born 1929 in Wassenaar) Canadian retired astronomer
- Pieter Kooijmans, (1933–2013), jurist, politician and diplomat, sat at the International Court of Justice
- Teun A. van Dijk, (born 1943) discourse analyst, lived in Wassenaar between 1945 and 1962
- Corinne Hofman (born Wassenar, 1959) professor of Caribbean Archaeology at Leiden University
- Leendert de Lange (born 1972) politician, deputy mayor of Wassenaar 2013/14 and mayor since 2019

=== Royal family ===
- Willem-Alexander of the Netherlands (born 1967) King of the Netherlands
- Queen Máxima of the Netherlands (born 1971) spouse of King Willem-Alexander
- Catharina-Amalia, Princess of Orange (born 2003) heir apparent to the throne of the Kingdom of the Netherlands
- Princess Alexia of the Netherlands (born 2005) second daughter of King Willem-Alexander and Queen Máxima
- Princess Ariane of the Netherlands (born 2007) third daughter of King Willem-Alexander and Queen Máxima

=== The arts ===
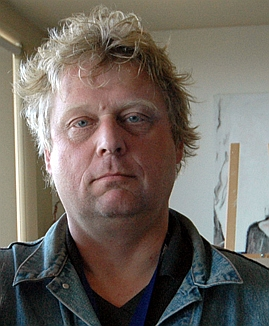
Theo van Gogh, 2004

- Felix Tikotin (1893–1986) architect, art collector, art dealer; founded the Tikotin Museum of Japanese Art; lived in Wassenaar.
- Henri Friedlaender (1904–1996) Israeli typographer and book designer, lived in the attic of his house in Wassenar in WWII
- Boudewijn Büch (1948–2002) writer, poet and television presenter; grew up in Wassenar
- Theo van Gogh (1957–2004) film and TV director and producer; screenwriter, actor, critic and author
- Thom Hoffman (born 1957 in Wassenaar), actor and photographer
- Lorena Kloosterboer (born 1962), artist and author, lived in Wassenaar from 1972–1979 and again from 1987–1993
- Anthony Ingruber (born 1990), Canadian actor, voice actor and impressionist, currently lives in Wassenaar

=== Science & business ===
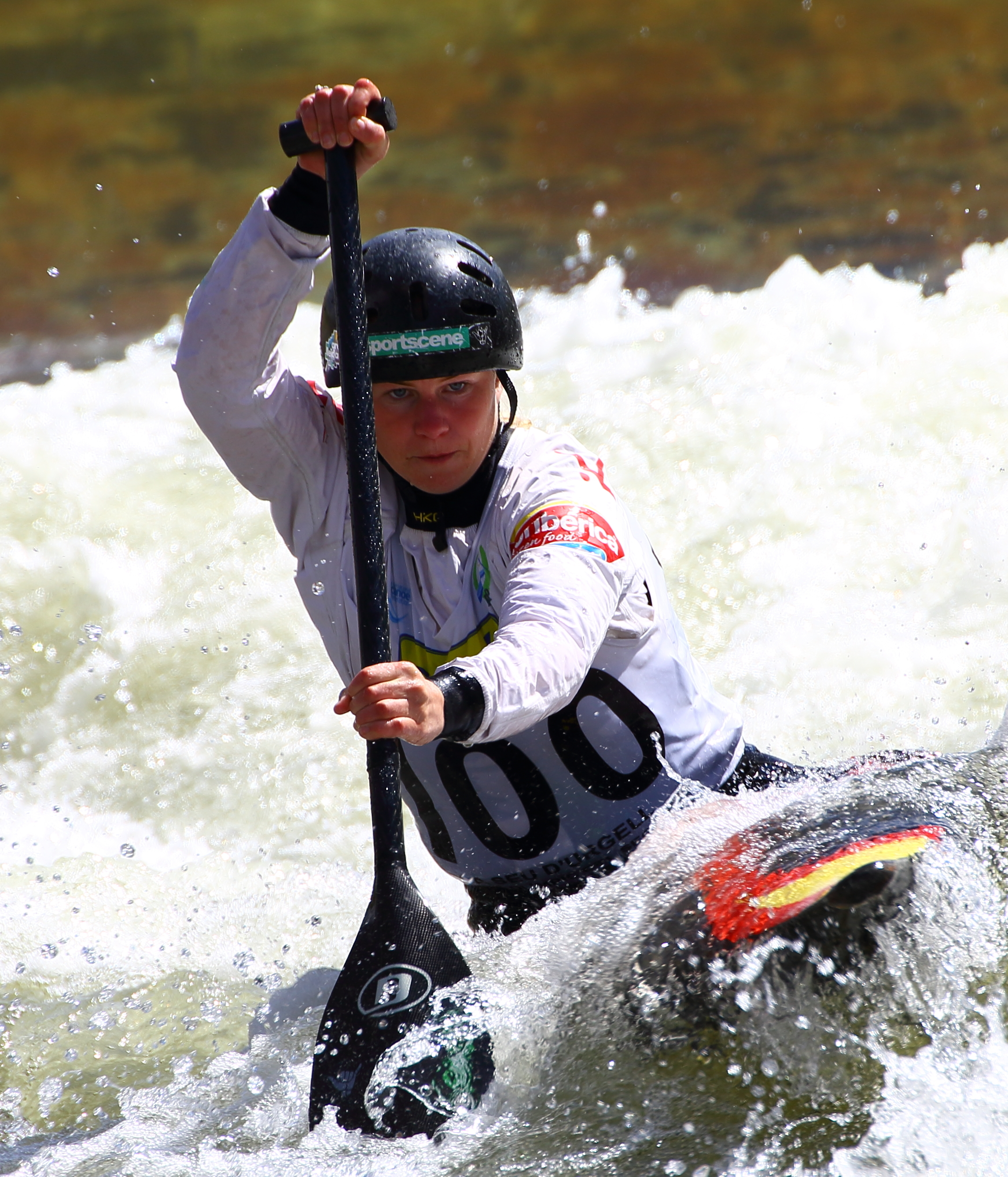
Annebel van der Knijff, 2017

- Sidney Van den Bergh FRS (born 1929 in Wassenaar) a retired Canadian astronomer
- Morris Tabaksblat (1937–2011) ex CEO of Unilever, lived and died here
- Rattan Chadha (born 1949) joint founder of the fashion company Mexx
- Hans M. Heybroek (1927–2022) botanist, breeder of elms resistant to Dutch elm disease

=== Sport ===
- Nico van der Voet (born 1944 in Wassenaar), water polo player
- Konrad Bartelski (born 1954), skier, lived in Wassenaar for a number of years
- Junior Strous (born 1986) racing driver, racing team owner and entrepreneur from Wassenaar
- Annebel van der Knijff (born 1996 in Wassenaar) ICF Dutch-Spanish canoe slalom paddler
- Laurens van Hoepen (born 2005), racing driver
- Mark Slats Athlete, lived in Wassenaar. The fastest solo row across the Atlantic in 30 days, 7 hours and 49 minutes in 2017.

== Gallery ==
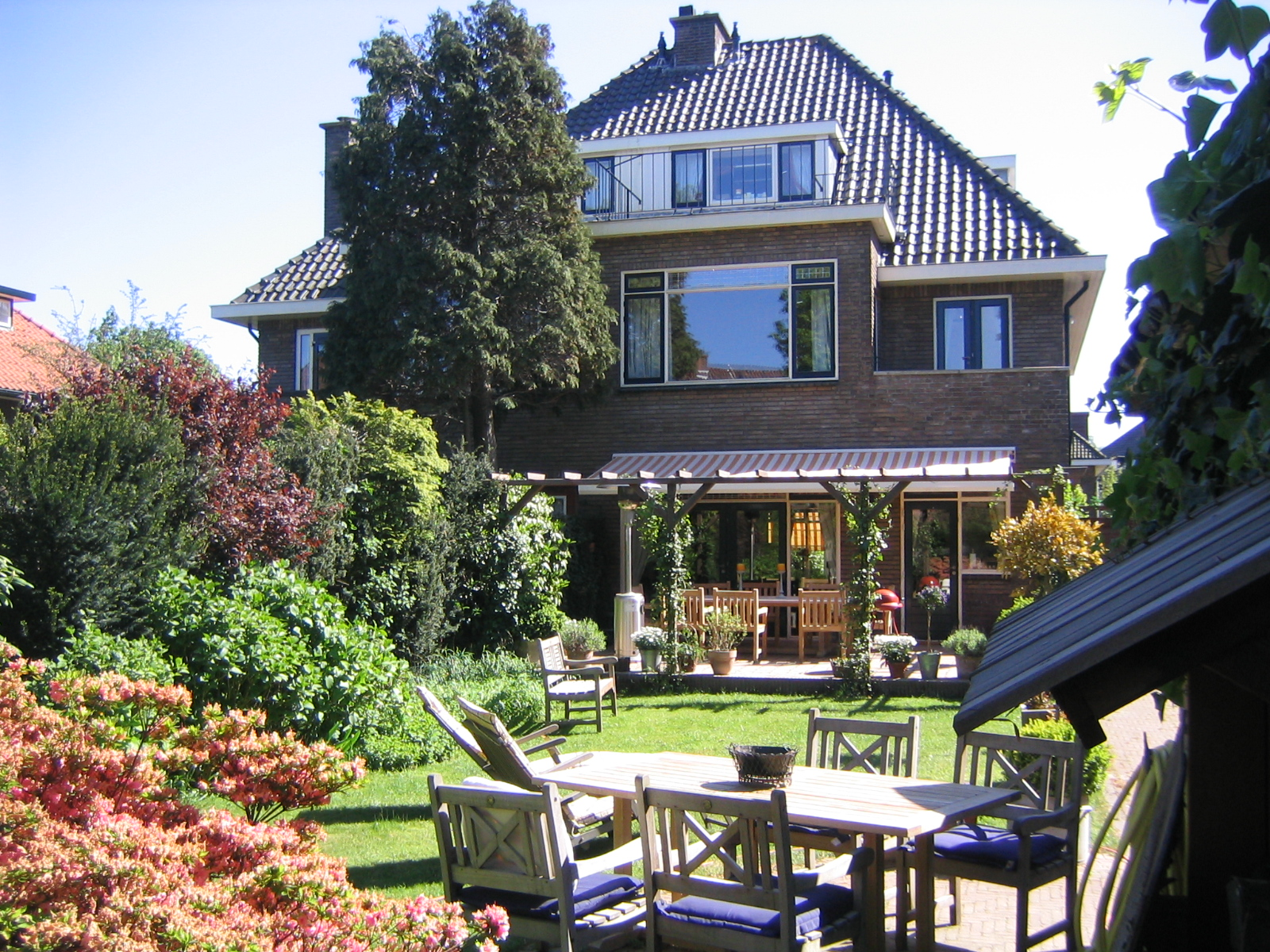
Hoflaan, Wassenaar

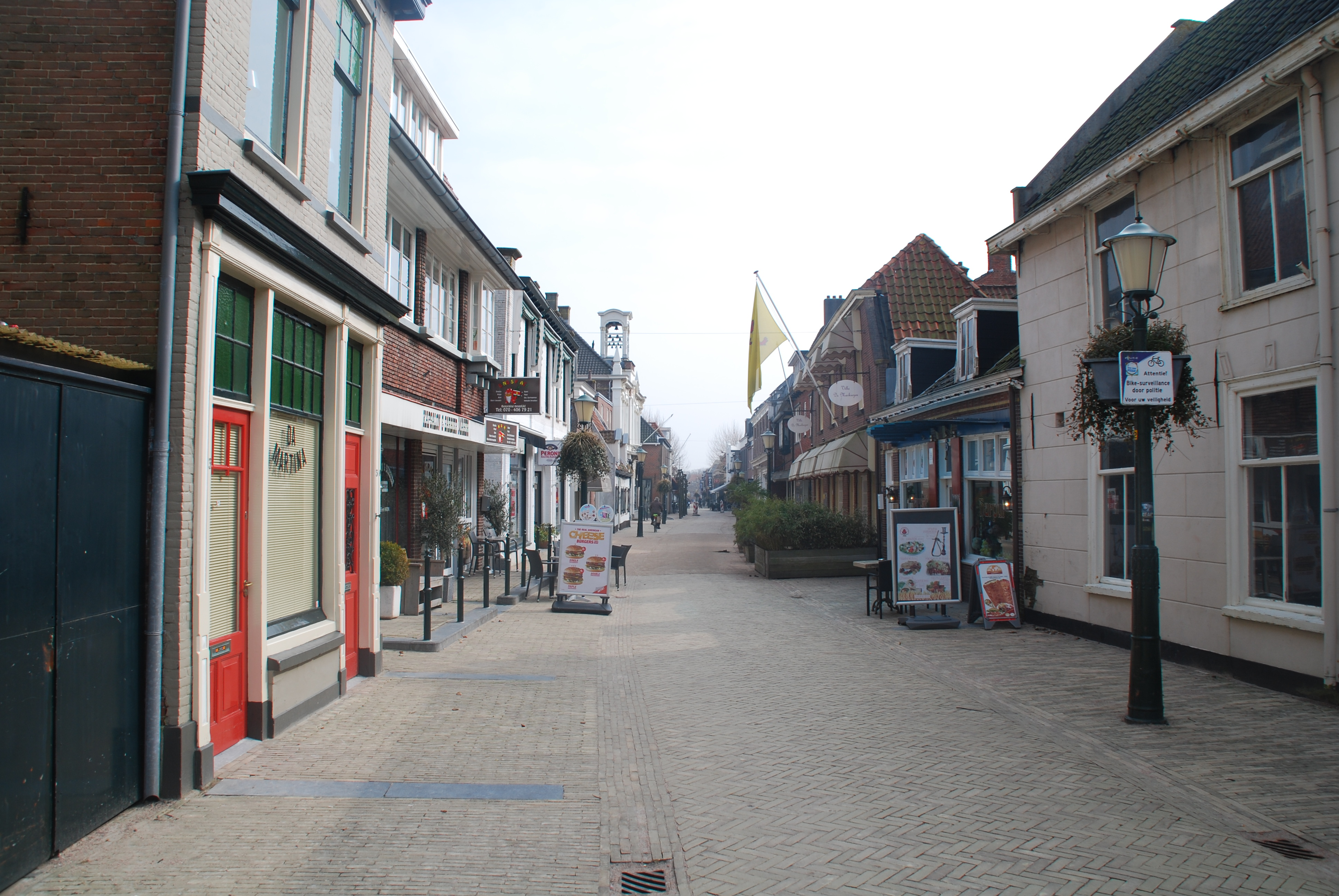
Langstraat Wassenaar

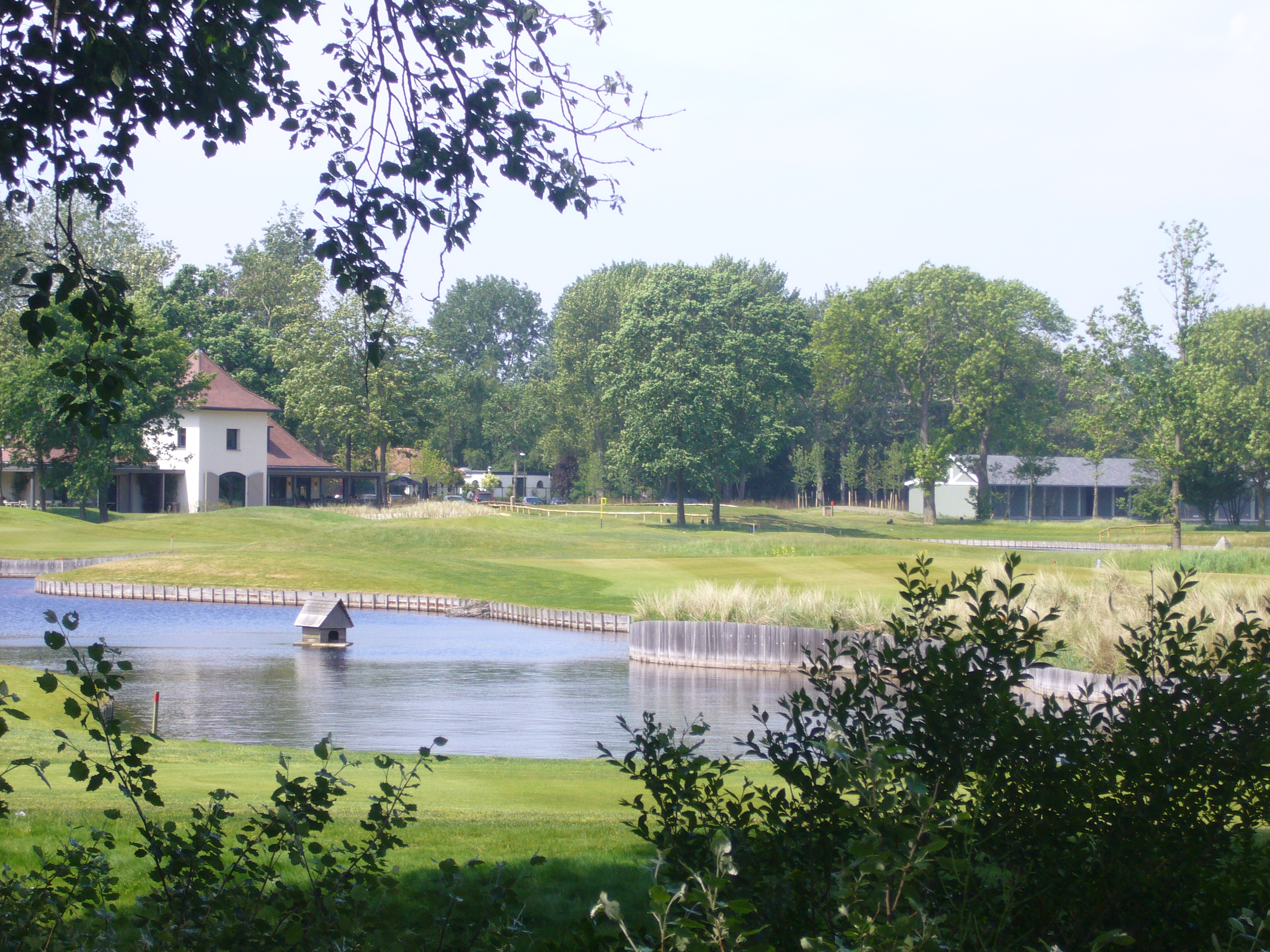
GC Groenendael

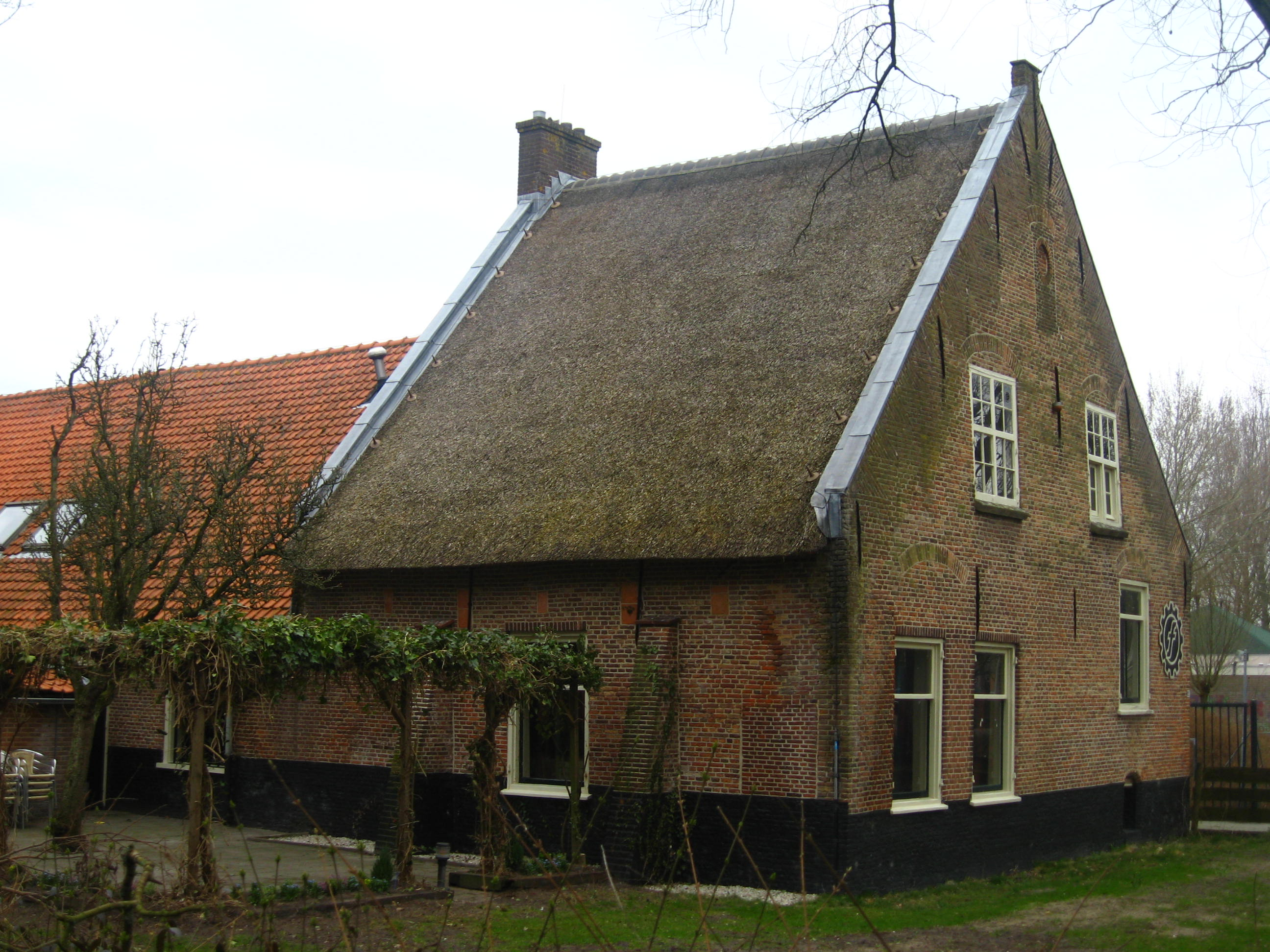
Huis Ter Weer, Deijlerweg, Wassenaar

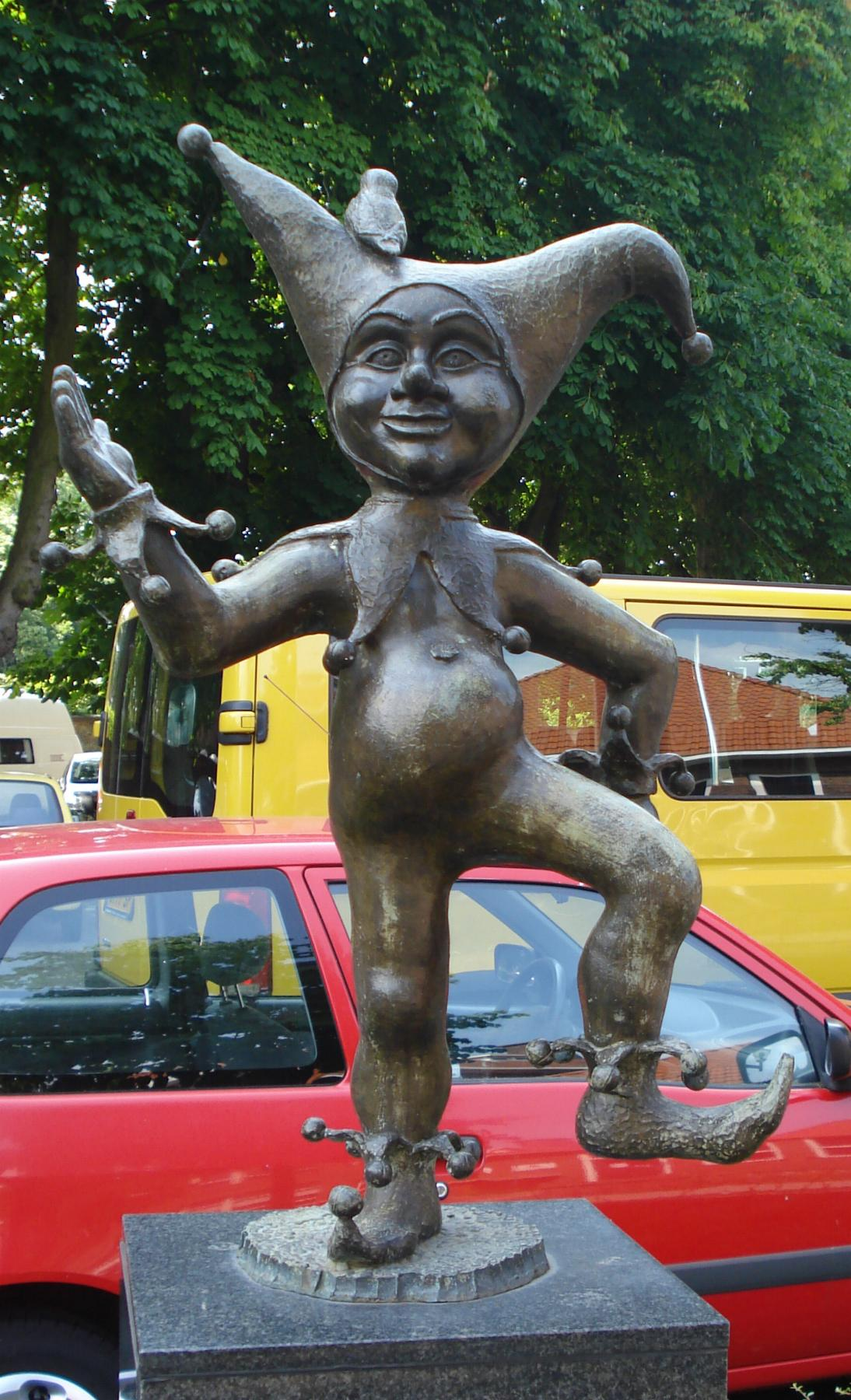
Artwork, Wassenaar

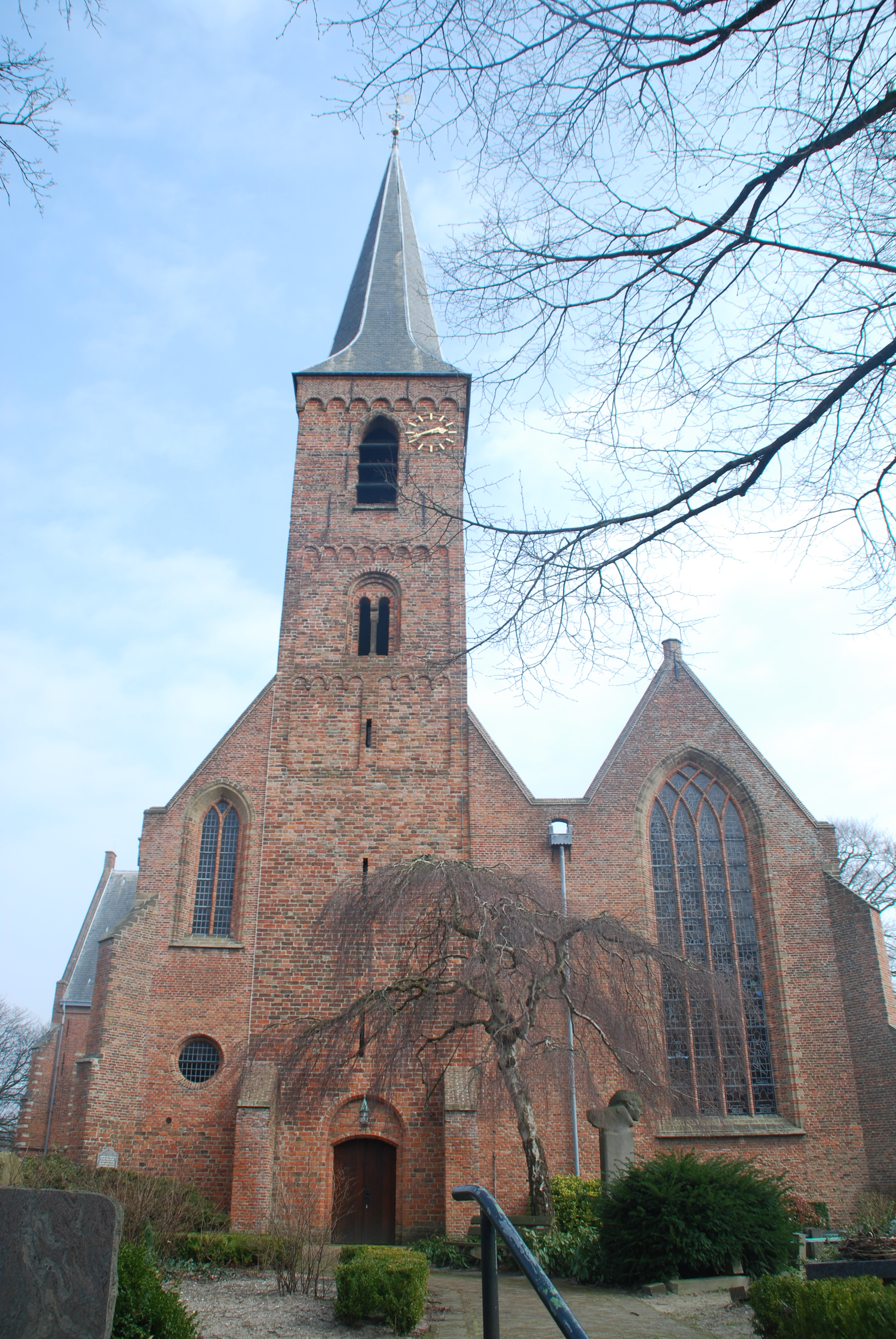
Dutch Reformed Church, Wassenaar

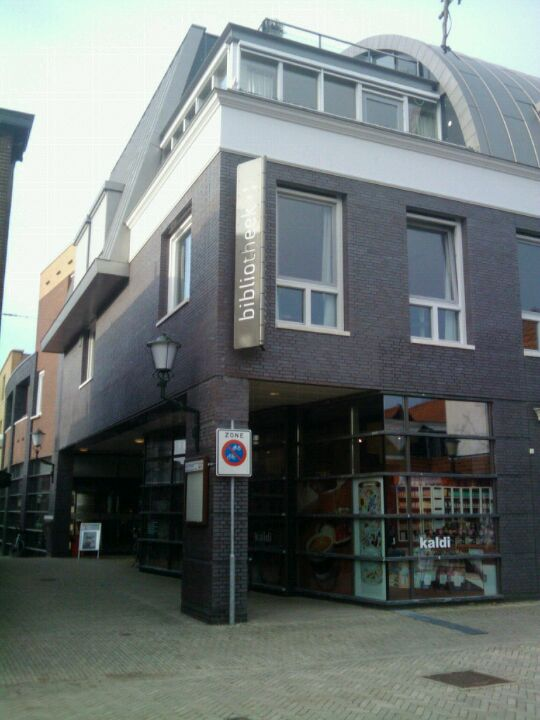
Wassenaar library

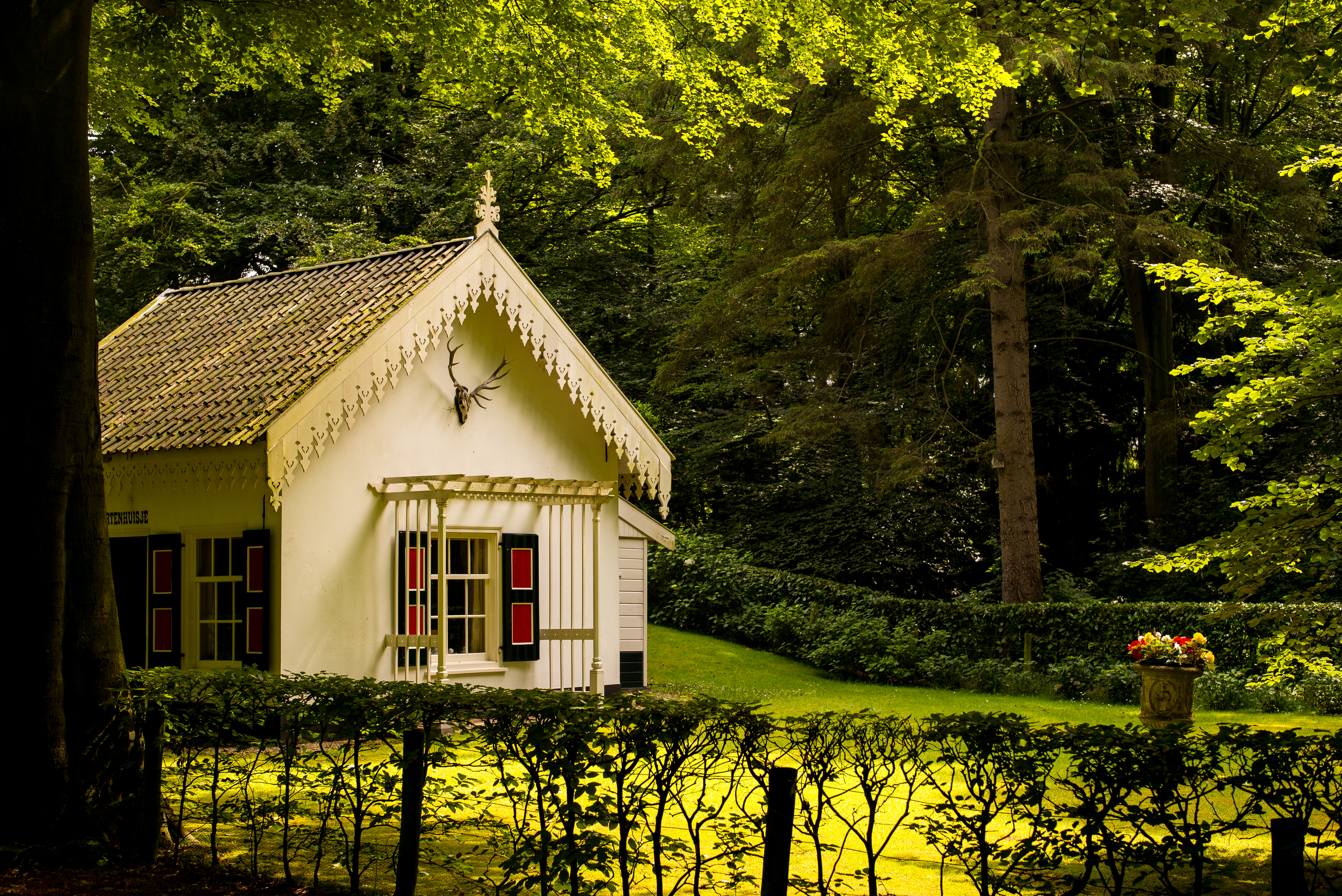
In the light of the forest

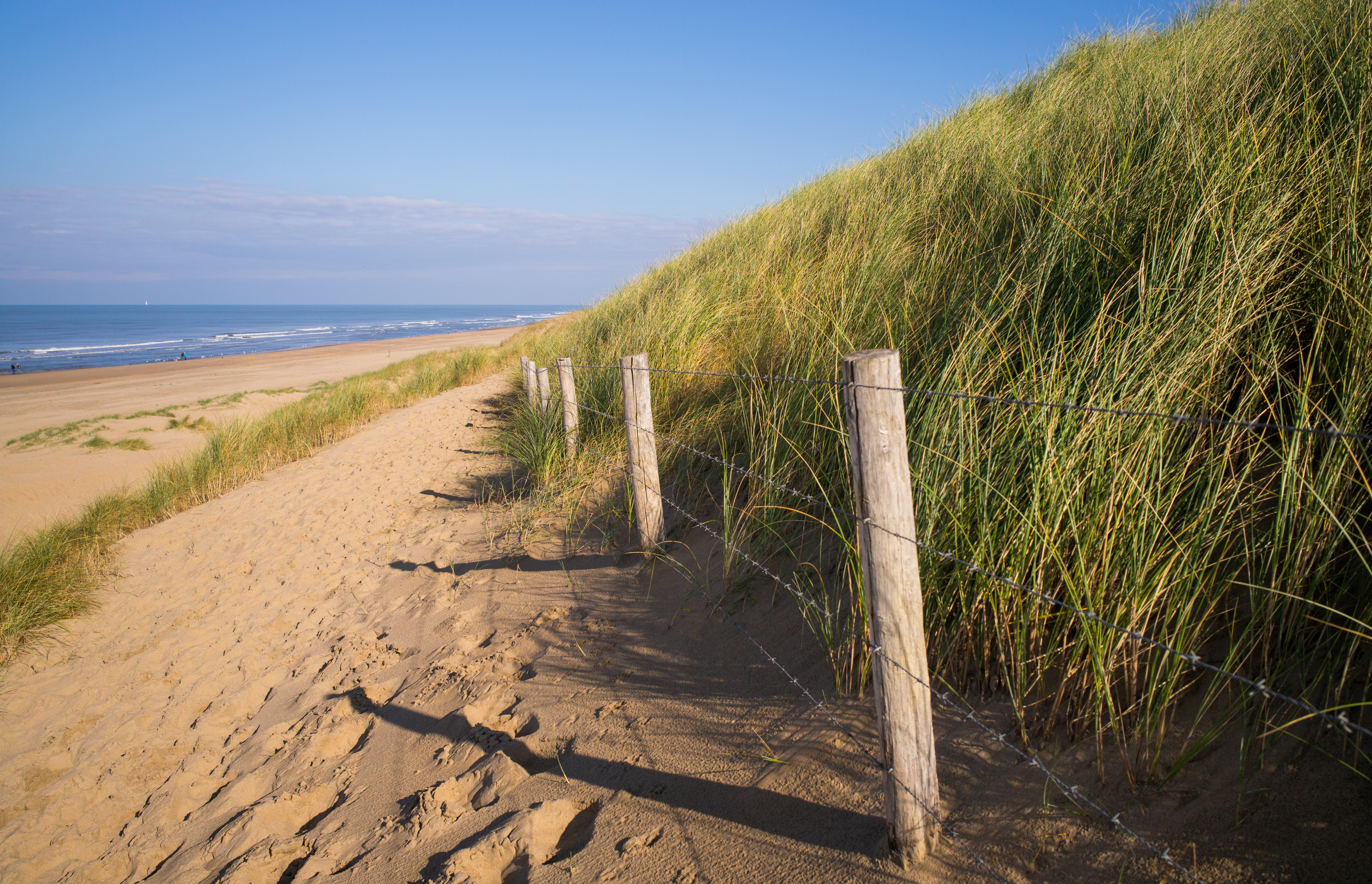
Autumn Beach, Wassenaar
