= Eli Lancman =

Israeli historian of Japanese and East Asian art

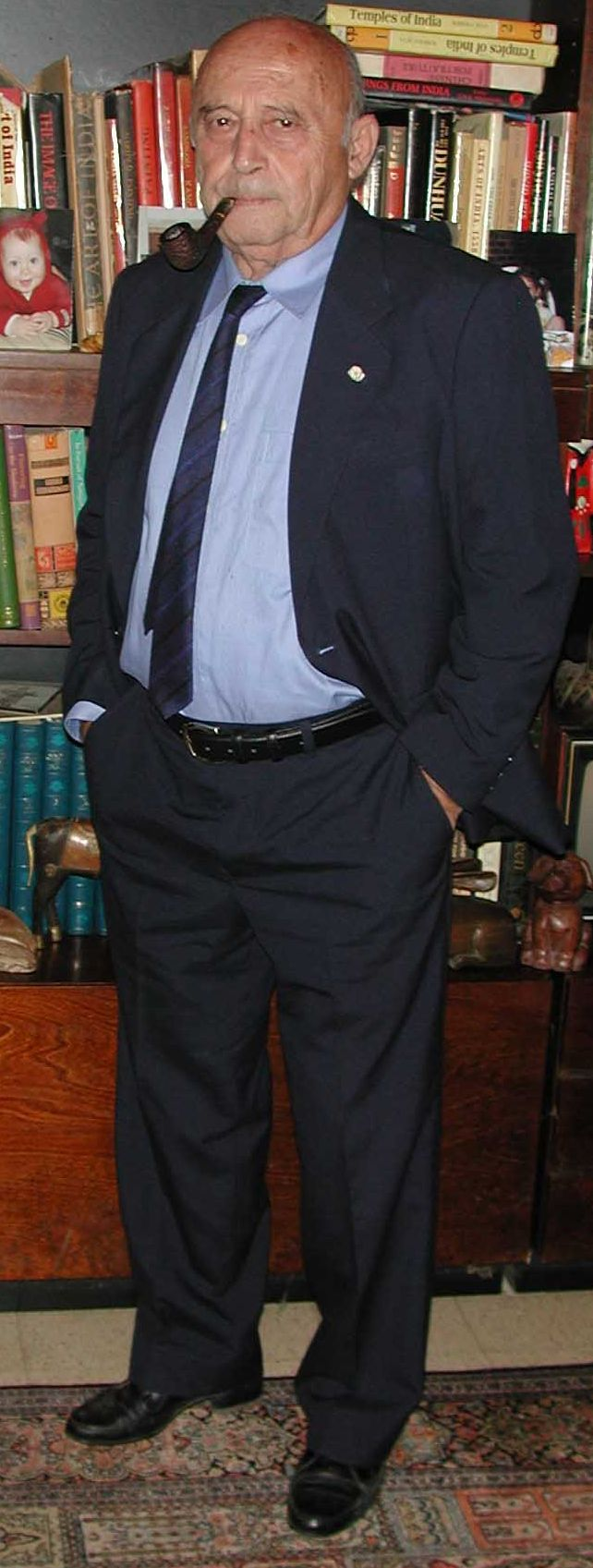
Lancman in 2009

Eli Lancman (Hebrew: אלי לנצמן; 1936 – December 2, 2024) was an Israeli historian of Japanese and East Asian art. Developer and director of the Tikotin Museum of Japanese Art in Haifa from 1966 to 1992, he was also one of the founders of the Israel-Japan Friendship Society.

== Biography ==
Born in Tel Aviv in 1936, Lancman studied seven years in Japan, graduate of the Jochi University (1960–1963) and Tokyo University (1964–1966). He specialized in curatorship and Japanese art conservation at the Yamato Bunkakan Museum in Nara and served as an art critic for two of the largest newspapers in Japan: Yomiuri and Mainichi.

He was invited in 1966 by Aba Hushi, mayor of Haifa, to direct and develop the Museum of Japanese Art in Haifa, and to serve as director and head curator, a position he held for about 30 years. In 2000 the museum was awarded the prestigious Japan Foundation Prize for its thirty years of activity. On June 22, 2001, Eli Lancman was awarded the Emperor's Decoration “Order of the Sacred Treasure, Gold Rays with Neck Ribbon”, for his many years of promoting of Japanese art and culture. His book Chinese Portraiture (1966) was the first to show the major differences between the Western attitudes towards drawing to that of the Chinese, which emphasizes the spiritual nature of the characters.

Lancman contributed many entries to the Hebrew Encyclopedia, including entries on Japanese and Chinese Art. He was one of the first lecturers in the Faculty of Art at Haifa University and served as a lecturer at the Technion – Israel Institute of Technology in the faculty of Humanities and Arts. He was one of the founders of the Israel-Japan Friendship Society and served as chairman until 2007. In 2009 he was appointed honorary chairman of the Israel-Japan Friendship Society.

Lancman was editor of a Hebrew language encyclopedia on Japanese culture and art. He died on December 2, 2024, at the age of 88.

== Selected publications ==
- Chinese Portraiture, Tuttle, Tokyo 1966 ISBN 0-8048-0104-5
- Tessai, New Japan (Mainichi) Vol.19, 1967
- China: Art and History, Taiwan Press, 1979.
- Japanese Art, Hebrew Encyclopedia vol. 20.
- Chinese Art, Hebrew Encyclopedia vol. 25.
- “Tea Taste” and Japanese esthetics, North, Writers’ Association, 2002
- Tantra: Love as a Conceptual Symbol, Nefesh, 2000.
- Big Art in Small Size, Japanese Netsuke and Art in Ivory, Weil Center, 2007

== Selected catalogues ==
- Japanese Drawings. Israel Museum 1973
- Hokusai, Paintings & Prints, M.O.J.A.H, 1970
- Genre Paintings, M.O.J.A.H, 1971
- Contemporary Japanese Prints, Tel Aviv Museum 1973
- Hashira-e & Triptychs, M.O.J.A.H, 1980
- Bijin-ga, M.O.J.A.H, 1981
- Fauna & Flora in Japanese Art, M.O.J.A.H, 1981
- Yakusha-e, Kabuki Prints, M.O.J.A.H, 1983
- Impressions in Monochrome, M.O.J.A.H, 1983
- Fukei Prints, M.O.J.A.H, 1984
- Surimono Prints, M.O.J.A.H, 1989
