= Leendert de Lange =

Dutch politician (born 1972)

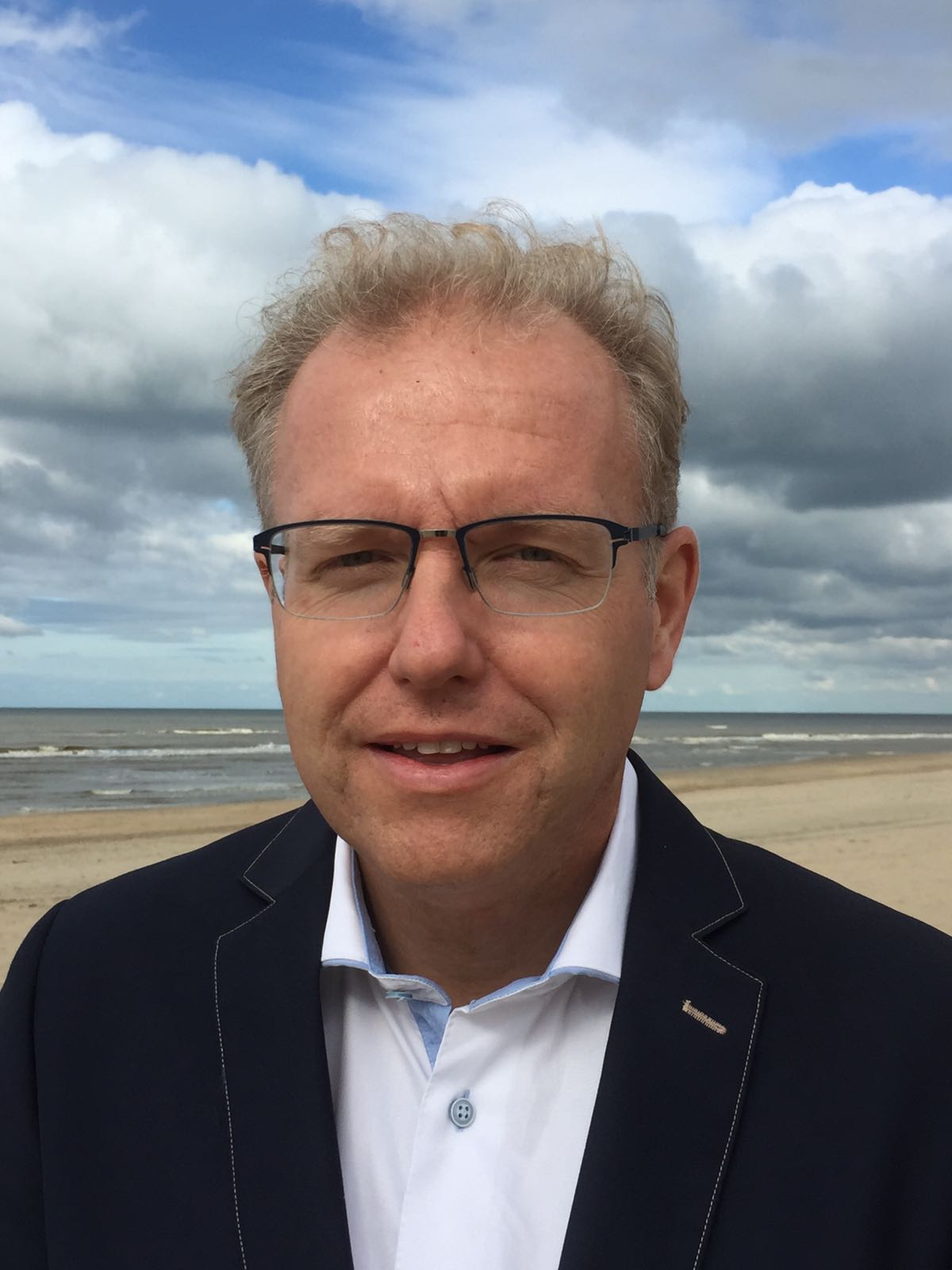

Mayor of Wassenaar
- Incumbent
- Assumed office 18 July 2019

Member of the House of Representatives of the Netherlands
- In office 31 March 2015 – 23 March 2017
- In office 31 October 2017 – 3 July 2019

Personal details
- Born: 13 November 1972 (age 53) Wassenaar, Netherlands
- Party: People's Party for Freedom and Democracy
- Education: Leiden University

Leendert Arent-Willem de Lange (born 13 November 1972) is a Dutch politician. He has been mayor of Wassenaar since 18 July 2019. Previously he was a member of the House of Representatives for the People's Party for Freedom and Democracy, serving from 31 March 2015 to 23 March 2017 and once again from 31 October 2017 to 3 July 2019. De Lange was alderman in Noordwijk between 2006 and 2013 and in Wassenaar between 2013 and 2014 where he also served as deputy mayor.

== Career ==
De Lange was born on 13 November 1972 in Wassenaar. He studied government management between 1991 and 1994 at the Thorbecke Academie. Subsequently, he studied public administration theory at Leiden University from 1995 to 2000. He worked at the district court and later for the public prosecutor of The Hague court between 1996 and 2000. From 2000 to 2005 he worked as advisor on parliamentary and ministerial contacts at the municipality of The Hague.

De Lange became member of the People's Party for Freedom and Democracy in 1992. He was member of the municipal council of Leiden between 1999 and 2006. Between May 2006 and February 2013, he was alderman in Noordwijk. From 11 February 2013 until 1 June 2014, he was alderman and deputy mayor in his birth town of Wassenaar. After his terms as alderman he worked for communication firm Dietz.

In the parliamentary elections of 2012 De Lange occupied place 53 on the candidate list of the People's Party for Freedom and Democracy. On 31 March 2015, he entered the House of Representatives of the Netherlands when he replaced René Leegte who had resigned. In the House of Representatives his portfolio was health care. His term in office ended on 23 March 2017. De Lange returned to the House on 31 October 2017. He resigned from the House on 3 July 2019 to become mayor of Wassenaar. On 18 July 2019, he was installed in this position.
