= Duindigt =

Horse racing venue in Wassenaar, Netherlands

Coordinates: 52°6′26″N 4°20′41″E

Renbaan Duindigt
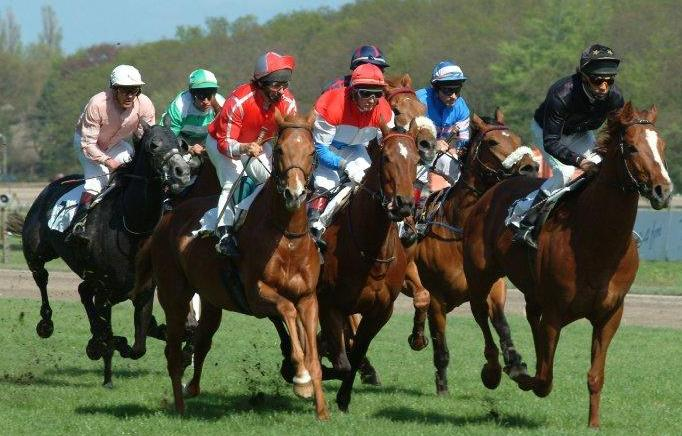
- Location: Wassenaar, Netherlands
- Type: Horse racing track
- Opened: 1906

Website
- duindigt.nl

Renbaan Duindigt is the oldest harness and horse racing venue in the Netherlands, located in Wassenaar. It opened in 1906 and remains the only horse racing venue in the country that has never closed.

== History ==
Renbaan Duindigt has hosted numerous prestigious races and was particularly popular in the 1970s and 1980s. Legendary horses such as Quicksilver S, Jojo Buitenzorg, and Kees Verkerk raced here, often accompanied by the iconic commentary of Hans Eijsvogel.

Unlike other racecourses in the Netherlands, Duindigt has maintained regular race events and betting opportunities. However, attendance has declined, facilities have deteriorated, and the venue has faced severe financial challenges in recent decades.

In 2021, administrator Arie van Bellen described the situation as "incredibly difficult", citing the venue's failure to adapt to modern entertainment trends, such as online betting and alternative leisure activities.

== Acquisition and Redevelopment ==
In July 2024, Amsterdam-based real estate investor Villa Betty acquired the site with the intent to renovate the racetrack, its hospitality areas, and grandstands. The investor also announced plans to build approximately 46 villas on the property and committed to investing €250,000 annually for ten years.

A prior proposal in 2023 had been rejected by Wassenaar's alderman Koetsier, due to non-compliance with local zoning and sustainability regulations. This rejection intensified the racetrack's financial troubles, bringing the managing foundation (Stichting Beheer Renbaan Duindigt) close to bankruptcy, and a foreclosure auction had been scheduled for 23 July 2024.

Villa Betty's renewed offer in 2024 averted the auction, with an immediate purchase agreement signed. The deal came as a surprise to the municipal council of Wassenaar, which had mixed reactions to the sale.

== Controversy ==
The proposed development has been politically contentious. The local party D66 expressed concern about the potential loss of the area's open, green character. Lokaal Wassenaar! criticized the racetrack's cultural significance, calling it "a glorified gambling palace", and questioned whether public intervention in support of the site was justified given its financial struggles.

Conversely, Hart voor Wassenaar supported the deal, viewing it as a compromise to preserve green space. They argued that without the current plan, a far denser residential development could occur in the future.

A motion to block the sale failed to gain a majority in the municipal council.
