= Tikotin Museum of Japanese Art =

Museum in Haifa, Israel

Coordinates: 32°48′33″N 34°59′07″E

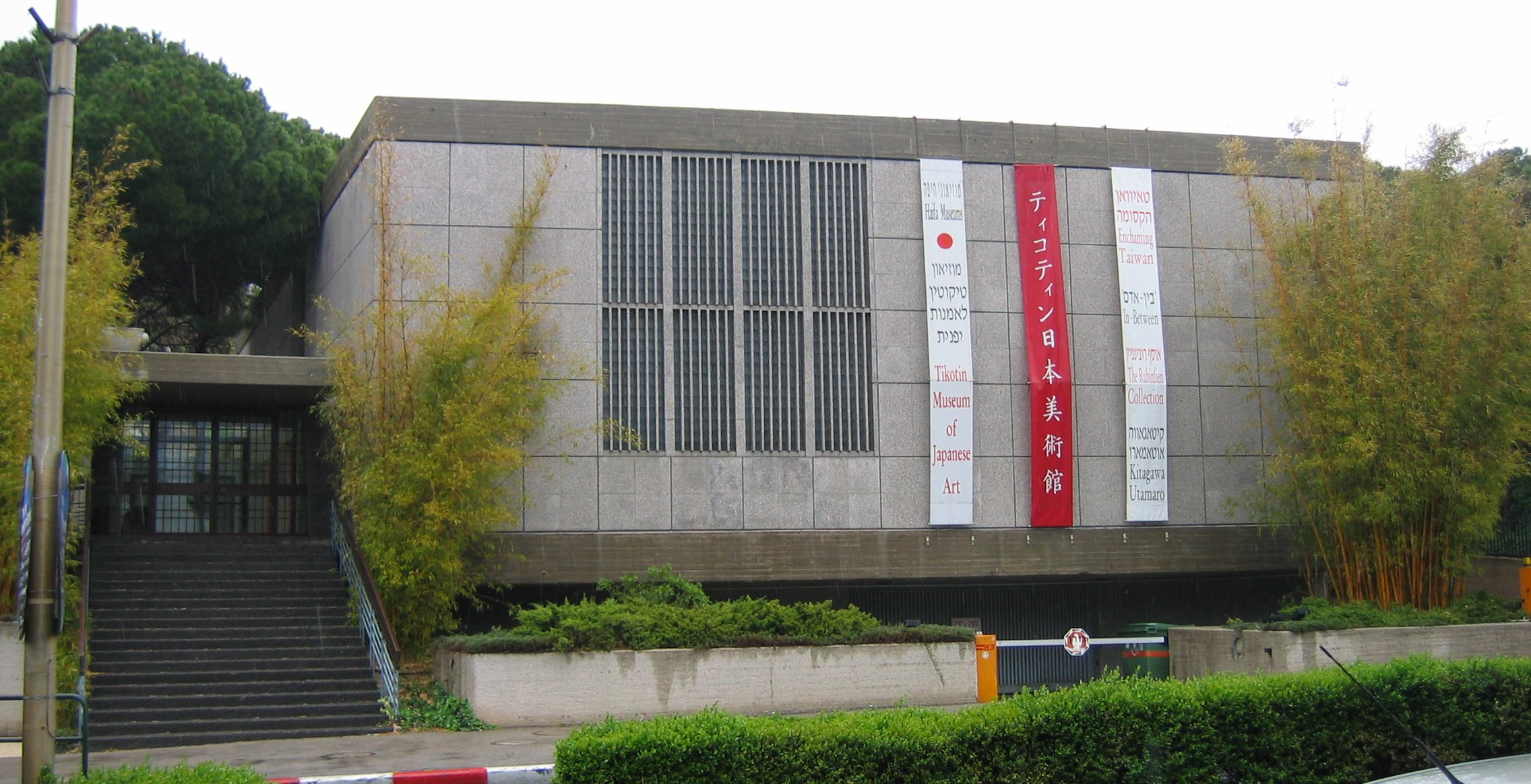
Tikotin Museum of Japanese Art, Haifa, Israel.

The Tikotin Museum of Japanese Art is a museum on the crest of Mount Carmel, in Haifa, Israel, dedicated to the preservation and exhibition of Japanese art. It is the only such museum in the Middle East. It was established in 1959 on the initiative of Felix Tikotin of the Netherlands, and Abba Hushi, who was the mayor of Haifa.

== History ==
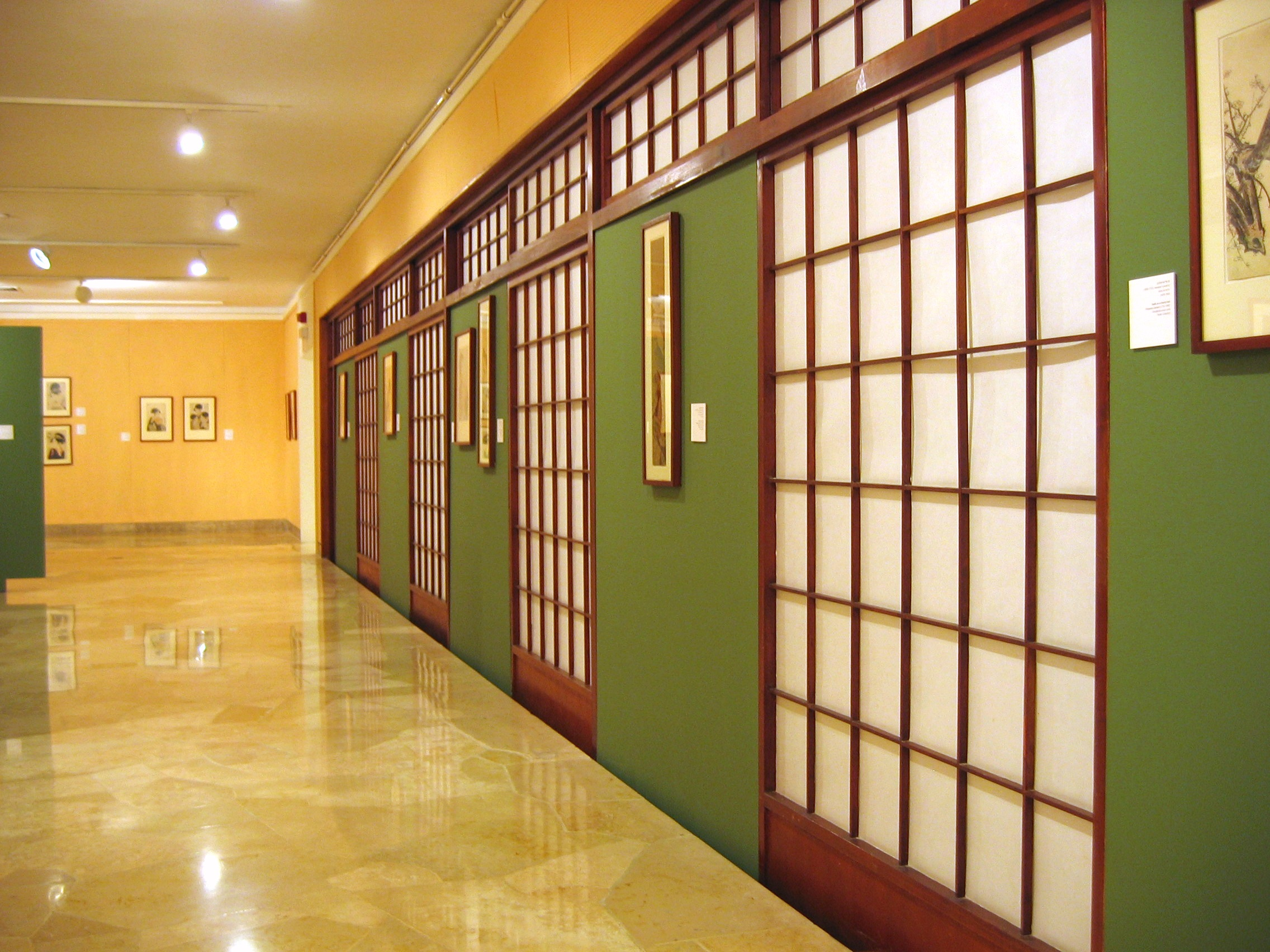
One of the museum's several exhibition halls.

Felix Tikotin, an architect by profession, was an internationally renowned collector and dealer in Japanese works of art. For more than forty years he amassed his valuable and rare collection and organized exhibitions of Japanese art in many museums. During the Second World War, because he was Jewish, Felix Tikotin fled from the Nazis. He hid his collection in the Netherlands to prevent it from falling into their hands. After the war, Tikotin decided that his unique collection should be taken to Israel, and in 1956 he came to Israel and donated the collection to one of Israel's museums. During a visit to Haifa he met Mayor Abba Hushi, and decided that the collection should remain in Haifa, and that he would build a pavilion specifically for exhibiting it here.

Tikotin travelled to the Netherlands, Switzerland, Belgium, France, England and Japan to organize support for his idea. He engaged the help of museum directors such as Nagatake Asano (1895–1965); academics such as Chisaburoh Yamada (1908–1984) of the Tokyo University of the Arts, who was also chosen to be the first director of the Japanese Museum in Haifa; spiritual leaders such as Victor M. A. Suzuki, son of the famous Zen philosopher, and others. During the years 1966–1992 the museum was directed by Eli Lancman, who received a prize from the Japanese government in 2001.

At a meeting of the Haifa Municipality on May 18, 1958, it was decided to acquire the "Kisch House" and its surrounding land. The house was built by Brigadier Frederick Kisch, Chairman of the Zionist Executive Committee in Jerusalem and Head of the Political Department of the Zionist Organization, later of the Jewish Agency from 1923 to 1931. He lived in the house from 1934 to 1939. Kisch, who commanded the Engineering Brigade of the British Eighth Army, fell in battle during the North African Campaign in April 1943. The Kisch House is still the home of the offices of the museum, the library, the creativity workshops, and a Japanese room. The library – the largest of its kind in Israel – comprises some 3,000 books and publications relating to Japanese art and culture.

In February 1959 plans were approved for a Japanese pavilion, and construction began on the exhibition hall in accordance with the ideas and plans of Felix Tikotin, supervised by the architect M. Lev. The exhibition hall was designed in the Japanese spirit. It is spacious, and has sliding doors of paper leading to the garden, conveying a Japanese atmosphere. On May 25, 1960, the Japanese Museum was opened to the public with an exhibition of works from the donor's collection. In accordance with Tikotin's wishes, a Board of Trustees of the museum was set up, headed today by his daughter, Ilana Drukker-Tikotin.

== Collections ==
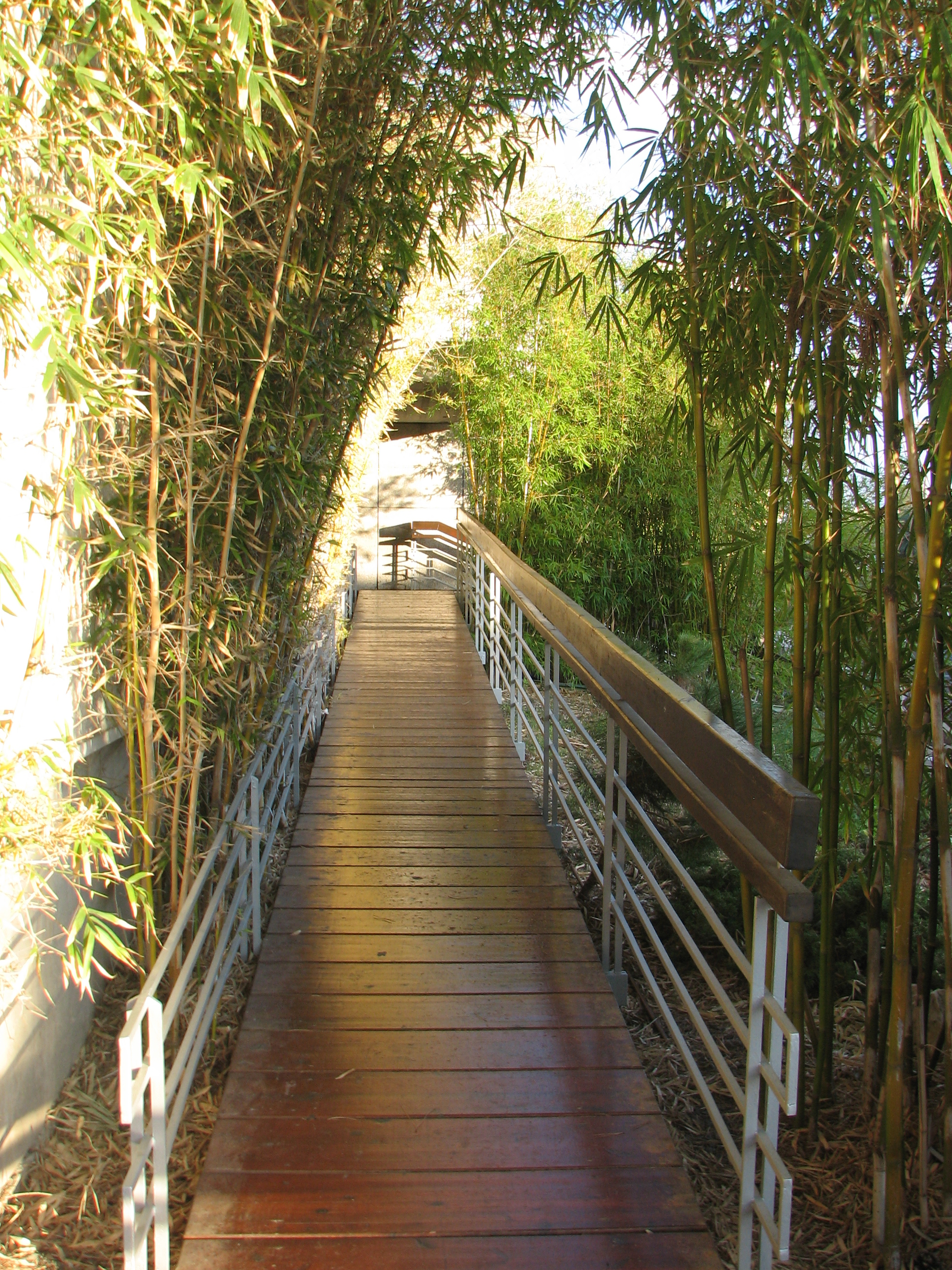
Bamboo-lined entrance bridge.

The museum's collection comprises some 8,000 items of art and crafts – paintings, prints, drawings, painted screens, textiles, antique illustrated texts, ceramics, miniature carvings (netsuke), lacquer and metal work, antique swords and functional art works, mainly from the 17th to 19th centuries, as well as a collection of modern Japanese art. The collection has increased over time, and other private collections have been donated.

Exhibitions cover different aspects of Japanese culture, displaying traditional and modern art, and emphasizing the aesthetic values unique to Japanese art. According to Japanese custom, a room is sparsely furnished with items selected for specific events and for the season. Hence the exhibitions are changed approximately every three months, and subject, style and period are common to all of them. Exhibitions are accompanied by illustrated catalogues and explanatory texts. The museum store also sells exhibition posters.

In 1982 the Japanese philanthropist Ryoichi Sasakawa donated the sum of one and half million dollars for the construction of a large new wing to the museum. It was designed by the Japanese architect Junzo Yoshimura, together with Israeli architect Al Mansfeld of Haifa. It was opened in 1995, and is funded by the Eva Tikotin-Licht Foundation. Yoshimura, one of the renowned architects of Japan, designed the National Museum at Nara in Japan and the Japan House, now known as Japan Society (Manhattan), in New York. Mansfeld is known as the architect of the Israel Museum in Jerusalem. The new wing has two floors and a lower parking area, and extends over 1,800 square metres. The exhibition hall covers 350 sq.m. and is connected to the original hall (300 sq.m.) in the old building. Adjacent to the large hall is a smaller hall of 120 sq.m. On the second floor the Raphael Angel acoustic Auditorium was constructed in 2000, with two hundred seats. A special staircase was connected to lead to the auditorium. The old building is a single story, and its integration with the new building created a single harmonious unit, embodying the Japanese spirit. The addition of these construction elements was planned by the firm Mansfeld Kehat Architects.

== Educational activities ==
Tikotin's dream was that the Japanese Museum should be a centre for studying Japanese arts and culture and for broadening the Israelis' knowledge about Japan. In the educational branch of the museum, workshops based on the exhibitions are conducted for schoolchildren and those of kindergarten age, for teachers, and for other groups. Courses are given about the Japanese language, calligraphy and ink drawing, ikebana, cooking, and special activities are held for children. There are also Japanese rooms for learning about how people live in Japan, their clothing, food, and homes.

The museum presents a variety of events concerning the arts and culture of Japan. These include lectures, films, the tea ceremony, festivals and special celebrations, many of which are held in the Raphael Angel Auditorium. As a result of its activities, the museum has become a centre for promoting and understanding the unique Japanese culture, and for establishing closer ties between the two nations.

== Awards and recognition ==
Since the re-opening of the museum in December 1995, there were some 145 new exhibits, most of which were curated by the museum's chief curator, Dr. Ilana Singer Blaine, who won the award by the minister of science and culture (2007), the award of the Japanese minister of foreign affairs (2014) and the Japanese emperor decoration “The Order of the Rising Sun, Gold Rays with Neck Rosette” conferred by the prime minister of Japan (2021). In 2000, the museum received the Japan Foundation Special Award, which is conferred annually on institutions that make significant contributions to cultural exchanges with Japan. In 2003, the Israeli Ministry of Education and Culture's committee for evaluating the quality of exhibitions and collections, ranked the Tikotin Museum of Japanese Art second only to the Israel Museum in order of merit.

== See also ==
- Israel–Japan relations
- List of museums in Israel
- Culture of Israel
