= Felix Tikotin =

Architect, art collector

Felix Tikotin (12 October 1893 – 15 August 1986) was an architect, art collector, and founder of the first Museum of Japanese Art in the Middle East.

== Biography ==
Felix Tikotin was born in Glogau, Germany to a Jewish family. His family was from the town of Tykocin. He grew up in Dresden and thought of studying art, but in the end became an architect.

In World War I, he served as an officer in the German army, fighting first on the Western front in Belgium and later in the East. He was awarded the Iron Cross, 2nd Class. After the war, he travelled to Japan on the Trans-Siberia Express and fell in love with Japanese culture. In April 1927, he opened an art gallery in Berlin.

During World War II, Tikotin settled in the Netherlands. His two daughters were born in The Hague, where he operated a home gallery. After the invasion of the Nazis, the family moved away from the coast. When things became worse for the Jews, the Dutch Resistance helped find them hiding places. The family survived but Tikotin's art collection, which had been hidden by his neighbours, was stolen.

After the war, Tikotin resumed his activities as a dealer in Japanese art. He held exhibitions all over Europe and the United States. In 1955 he organised the first overseas exhibition of the origami by Akira Yoshizawa (in the Stedelijk Museum of Amsterdam). He played an important role in introducing ikebana and other Japanese genres to the West.

When Tikotin first visited Israel in 1956, he decided that the major part of his collection belonged there. He helped to build an exhibition hall and bought the Kisch House in Haifa to house his art. The Tikotin Museum of Japanese Art opened in 1960.
