= List of European commissioners by member state =

This is a list of European commissioners by member state of the European Union. Each name is a member of the European Commission and hold a specific portfolio within the college, led by the president of the European Commission. They operate similarly as European-level equivalents to national government ministers. Each member state of the European Union has the right to a single commissioner (before the Barroso I Commission in November 2004, the five largest states—France, Germany, Italy, Spain and the United Kingdom—were granted two) and appoints them in consultation with the president.

The accession of Romania and Bulgaria in 2007 raised the number of commissioners from 25 to 27, and after the accession of Croatia in 2013 the number of commissioners raised to 28. The United Kingdom left the EU on 31 January 2020, and did not nominate a commissioner when the Juncker Commission ended on 1 December 2019.

Below is a list of all past and present European commissioners according to the member state they were nominated by, including the presidents of the European Coal and Steel Community and European Atomic Energy Community. The colours indicate their European political family background (blue for conservative or centre-right, mainly the European People's Party; red for left-wing or social democrats, mainly the Party of European Socialists; yellow for centrist or liberals, mainly the Alliance of Liberals and Democrats for Europe Party; green for green politicians, mainly the European Green Party; grey for independents or unknowns; and their pan-European predecessors).

== European commissioners by current member state ==
=== Austria ===
Name	Portfolio	Start	End	Commission	National party	European party
Franz Fischler	Agriculture and Rural Development	23 January 1995	15 September 1999	Santer	ÖVP	EPP
Franz Fischler	Agriculture, Rural Development and Fisheries	16 September 1999	21 November 2004	Prodi	ÖVP	EPP
Benita Ferrero-Waldner	External Relations and European Neighbourhood Policy	22 November 2004	1 December 2009	Barroso I	ÖVP	EPP
Benita Ferrero-Waldner	Trade and European Neighbourhood Policy	1 December 2009	9 February 2010	Barroso I	ÖVP	EPP
Johannes Hahn	Regional Policy	9 February 2010	31 October 2014	Barroso II	ÖVP	EPP
Johannes Hahn	Justice, Fundamental Rights and Citizenship (acting)	19 April 2014	25 May 2014	Barroso II	ÖVP	EPP
Johannes Hahn	Justice, Fundamental Rights and Citizenship (acting)	1 July 2014	16 July 2014	Barroso II	ÖVP	EPP
Johannes Hahn	European Neighbourhood Policy and Enlargement Negotiations	1 November 2014	30 November 2019	Juncker	ÖVP	EPP
Johannes Hahn	Regional Policy (acting)	3 July 2019	30 November 2019	Juncker	ÖVP	EPP
Johannes Hahn	Budget and Administration	1 December 2019	30 November 2024	Von der Leyen I	ÖVP	EPP
Magnus Brunner	Internal Affairs and Migration	1 December 2024	present	Von der Leyen II	ÖVP	EPP

=== Belgium ===
Name	Portfolio	Start	End	Commission	National party	European party
Jean Rey	External Relations	7 January 1958	9 January 1962	Hallstein I	PLP	ALDE
Jean Rey	External Relations	9 January 1962	30 June 1967	Hallstein II	PLP	ALDE
Jean Rey	President	2 July 1967	30 June 1970	Rey	PLP	ALDE
Albert Coppé	Budget, Credit, Investment, Press and Information	2 July 1967	30 June 1970	Rey	CVP	EPP
Albert Coppé	Social Affairs, Transport, Personnel, Administration, Credit, Investment, Budget and Financial Control	1 July 1970	21 March 1972	Malfatti	CVP	EPP
Albert Coppé	Social Affairs, Transport, Personnel, Administration, Credit, Investment, Budget and Financial Control	22 March 1972	5 January 1973	Mansholt	CVP	EPP
Henri Simonet	Taxation, Financial Institutions and Energy (Vice President)	6 January 1973	5 January 1977	Ortoli	PS	PES
Étienne Davignon	Internal Market, Industrial Affairs and Customs Union	6 January 1977	6 January 1981	Jenkins	CDH	EPP
Étienne Davignon	Industrial Affairs, Energy, Research and Science (Vice President)	6 January 1981	5 January 1985	Thorn	CDH	EPP
Willy De Clercq	External Relations and Trade	5 January 1985	5 January 1989	Delors I	PVV	ALDE
Karel Van Miert	Transport, Credit, Investment, and Consumer Protection	6 January 1989	4 January 1993	Delors II	SP.A	PES
Karel Van Miert	Competition, Personnel and Administration (Vice President)	5 January 1993	23 January 1995	Delors III	SP.A	PES
Karel Van Miert	Competition	23 January 1995	15 September 1999	Santer	SP.A	PES
Philippe Busquin	Research	16 September 1999	18 July 2004	Prodi	PS	PES
Louis Michel	Research	18 July 2004	21 November 2004	Prodi	MR	ALDE
Louis Michel	Development and Humanitarian Aid	22 November 2004	17 July 2009	Barroso I	MR	ALDE
Karel De Gucht	Development and Humanitarian Aid	17 July 2009	9 February 2010	Barroso I	VLD	ALDE
Karel De Gucht	Trade	9 February 2010	31 October 2014	Barroso II	VLD	ALDE
Marianne Thyssen	Employment, Social Affairs, Skills and Labour Mobility	1 November 2014	30 November 2019	Juncker	CD&V	EPP
Didier Reynders	Justice	1 December 2019	30 November 2024	Von der Leyen I	MR	ALDE
Didier Reynders	Competition (acting)	5 September 2023	8 December 2023	Von der Leyen I	MR	ALDE
Hadja Lahbib	Equality; Preparedness and Crisis Management	1 December 2024	present	Von der Leyen II	MR	ALDE

=== Bulgaria ===
Name	Portfolio	Start	End	Commission	National party	European party
Meglena Kuneva	Consumer Protection	1 January 2007	9 February 2010	Barroso I	NDSV	ALDE
Kristalina Georgieva	International Cooperation, Humanitarian Aid and Crisis Response	9 February 2010	31 October 2014	Barroso II	GERB	EPP
Kristalina Georgieva	Budget and Human Resources (Vice President)	1 November 2014	31 December 2016	Juncker	GERB	EPP
Mariya Gabriel	Digital Economy and Society	7 July 2017	30 November 2019	Juncker	GERB	EPP
Mariya Gabriel	Innovation, Research, Culture, Education and Youth	1 December 2019	15 May 2023	Von der Leyen I	GERB	EPP
Iliana Ivanova	Innovation, Research, Culture, Education and Youth	19 September 2023	30 November 2024	Von der Leyen I	GERB	EPP
Ekaterina Zaharieva	Startups, Research and Innovation	1 December 2024	present	Von der Leyen II	GERB	EPP

=== Croatia ===
Name	Portfolio	Start	End	Commission	National party	European party
Neven Mimica	Consumer Protection	1 July 2013	31 October 2014	Barroso II	SDP	PES
Neven Mimica	International Cooperation and Development	1 November 2014	30 November 2019	Juncker	SDP	PES
Dubravka Šuica	Democracy and Demography (Vice President)	1 December 2019	30 November 2024	Von der Leyen I	HDZ	EPP
Dubravka Šuica	Mediterranean	1 December 2024	present	Von der Leyen II	HDZ	EPP

=== Cyprus ===
Name	Portfolio	Start	End	Commission	National party	European party
Markos Kyprianou	Budget	1 May 2004	21 November 2004	Prodi	DIKO	PES
Markos Kyprianou	Health and Consumer Protection	22 November 2004	1 January 2007	Barroso I	DIKO	PES
Markos Kyprianou	Health	1 January 2007	3 March 2008	Barroso I	DIKO	PES
Androulla Vassiliou	Health	3 March 2008	9 February 2010	Barroso I	EDI	ALDE
Androulla Vassiliou	Education, Culture, Multilingualism and Youth	9 February 2010	31 October 2014	Barroso II	EDI	ALDE
Christos Stylianides	Humanitarian Aid and Crisis Management	1 November 2014	30 November 2019	Juncker	DISY	EPP
Stella Kyriakidou	Health and Food Safety	1 December 2019	30 November 2024	Von der Leyen I	DISY	EPP
Costas Kadis	Fisheries and Oceans	1 December 2024	present	Von der Leyen II	Ind.	Ind.

=== Czech Republic ===
Name	Portfolio	Start	End	Commission	National party	European party
Pavel Telička	Health and Consumer Protection	1 May 2004	21 November 2004	Prodi	US-DEU	ALDE
Vladimír Špidla	Employment, Social Affairs and Equal Opportunities	22 November 2004	9 February 2010	Barroso I	ČSSD	PES
Štefan Füle	Enlargement and European Neighbourhood Policy	9 February 2010	31 October 2014	Barroso II	ČSSD	PES
Věra Jourová	Justice, Consumers and Gender Equality	1 November 2014	30 November 2019	Juncker	ANO	ALDE
Věra Jourová	Values and Transparency (Vice President)	1 December 2019	30 November 2024	Von der Leyen I	ANO	ALDE
Věra Jourová	A Europe Fit for the Digital Age (acting)	5 September 2023	8 December 2023	Von der Leyen I	ANO	ALDE
Věra Jourová	Justice (acting)	15 April 2024	25 June 2024	Von der Leyen I	ANO	ALDE
Jozef Síkela	International Partnerships	1 December 2024	present	Von der Leyen II	STAN	Ind.

=== Denmark ===
Name	Portfolio	Start	End	Commission	National party	European party
Finn Olav Gundelach	Internal Market and Customs Union	6 January 1973	5 January 1977	Ortoli	SD	PES
Finn Olav Gundelach	Agriculture and Fisheries (Vice President)	5 January 1977	6 January 1981	Jenkins	SD	PES
Finn Olav Gundelach	Agriculture	6 January 1981	13 January 1981	Thorn	SD	PES
Poul Dalsager	Agriculture	20 January 1981	5 January 1985	Thorn	SD	PES
Henning Christophersen	Budget, Financial Control, Personnel and Administration (Vice President)	5 January 1985	5 January 1989	Delors I	V	ALDE
Henning Christophersen	Economic and Financial Affairs (Vice President)	6 January 1989	4 January 1993	Delors II	V	ALDE
Henning Christophersen	Economic, Financial and Monetary Affairs, Credit and Investment (Vice President)	5 January 1993	23 January 1995	Delors III	V	ALDE
Ritt Bjerregaard	Environment and Nuclear Safety	23 January 1995	15 September 1999	Santer	SD	PES
Poul Nielson	Development and Humanitarian Aid	16 September 1999	21 November 2004	Prodi	SD	PES
Mariann Fischer Boel	Agriculture and Rural Development	22 November 2004	9 February 2010	Barroso I	V	ALDE
Connie Hedegaard	Climate Action	9 February 2010	31 October 2014	Barroso II	KF	EPP
Margrethe Vestager	Competition	1 November 2014	30 November 2019	Juncker	RV	ALDE
Margrethe Vestager	A Europe Fit for the Digital Age (Executive Vice President)	1 December 2019	30 November 2024	Von der Leyen I	RV	ALDE
Margrethe Vestager	Competition	1 December 2019	30 November 2024	Von der Leyen I	RV	ALDE
Margrethe Vestager	Innovation and Research (acting)	10 May 2023	5 September 2023	Von der Leyen I	RV	ALDE
Dan Jørgensen	Energy and Housing	1 December 2024	present	Von der Leyen II	SD	PES

=== Estonia ===
Name	Portfolio	Start	End	Commission	National party	European party
Siim Kallas	Economic and Monetary Affairs	1 May 2004	21 November 2004	Prodi	ER	ALDE
Siim Kallas	Administrative Affairs, Audit and Anti-Fraud (Vice President)	22 November 2004	9 February 2010	Barroso I	ER	ALDE
Siim Kallas	Transport (Vice President)	9 February 2010	31 October 2014	Barroso II	ER	ALDE
Siim Kallas	Economic and Monetary Affairs and the Euro (acting)	7 April 2014	25 May 2014	Barroso II	ER	ALDE
Siim Kallas	Economic and Monetary Affairs and the Euro (acting)	1 July 2014	16 July 2014	Barroso II	ER	ALDE
Andrus Ansip	Digital Single Market (Vice President)	1 November 2014	1 July 2019	Juncker	ER	ALDE
Andrus Ansip	Digital Economy and Society (acting)	1 January 2017	7 July 2017	Juncker	ER	ALDE
Kadri Simson	Energy	1 December 2019	30 November 2024	Von der Leyen I	EK	ALDE
Kaja Kallas	Foreign Affairs and Security Policy (Vice President)	1 December 2024	present	Von der Leyen II	ER	ALDE

=== Finland ===
Name	Portfolio	Start	End	Commission	National party	European party
Erkki Liikanen	Budget, Personnel and Administration	25 January 1995	15 September 1999	Santer	SDP	PES
Erkki Liikanen	Enterprise and Information Society	16 September 1999	11 July 2004	Prodi	SDP	PES
Olli Rehn	Enterprise and Information Society	12 July 2004	21 November 2004	Prodi	SK	ALDE
Olli Rehn	Enlargement	22 November 2004	9 February 2010	Barroso I	SK	ALDE
Olli Rehn	Economic and Monetary Affairs	9 February 2010	27 October 2011	Barroso II	SK	ALDE
Olli Rehn	Economic and Monetary Affairs and the Euro (Vice President)	27 October 2011	1 July 2014	Barroso II	SK	ALDE
Jyrki Katainen	Economic and Monetary Affairs and the Euro (Vice President)	16 July 2014	31 October 2014	Barroso II	KOK	EPP
Jyrki Katainen	Jobs, Growth, Investment and Competitiveness (Vice President)	1 November 2014	30 November 2019	Juncker	KOK	EPP
Jutta Urpilainen	International Partnerships	1 December 2019	30 November 2024	Von der Leyen I	SDP	PES
Henna Virkkunen	Tech Sovereignty, Security and Democracy (Executive Vice President)	1 December 2024	present	Von der Leyen II	KOK	EPP

=== France ===
Name	Portfolio	Start	End	Commission	National party	European party
Robert Lemaignen	Overseas Development	7 January 1958	9 January 1962	Hallstein I	Unknown	
Robert Marjolin	Economic and Financial Affairs (Vice President)	7 January 1958	9 January 1962	Hallstein I	SFIO	PES
Robert Marjolin	Economic and Financial Affairs (Vice President)	9 January 1962	30 June 1967	Hallstein II	SFIO	PES
Henri Rochereau	Overseas Development	9 January 1962	30 June 1967	Hallstein II	Unknown	
Henri Rochereau	Overseas Development	2 July 1967	30 June 1970	Rey	Unknown	
Raymond Barre	Economic and Financial Affairs (Vice President)	2 July 1967	30 June 1970	Rey	UDF	ALDE
Raymond Barre	Economic and Financial Affairs (Vice President)	1 July 1970	21 March 1972	Malfatti	UDF	ALDE
Raymond Barre	Economic and Financial Affairs (Vice President)	22 March 1972	5 January 1973	Mansholt	UDF	ALDE
Jean-François Deniau	Enlargement and Development Aid	1 July 1970	21 March 1972	Malfatti	UDF	ALDE
Jean-François Deniau	Enlargement and Development Aid	22 March 1972	5 January 1973	Mansholt	UDF	ALDE
Jean-François Deniau	Development, Budget and Financial Control	6 January 1973	5 January 1977	Ortoli	UDF	ALDE
François-Xavier Ortoli	President	6 January 1973	5 January 1977	Ortoli	UDR / RPR	EPP
François-Xavier Ortoli	Economics, Finance, Credit and Investment (Vice President)	6 January 1977	6 January 1981	Jenkins	UDR / RPR	EPP
François-Xavier Ortoli	Economics, Finance, Credit and Investment (Vice President)	6 January 1981	5 January 1985	Thorn	UDR / RPR	EPP
Claude Cheysson	Development, Budget and Financial Control	6 January 1973	5 January 1977	Ortoli	PS	PES
Claude Cheysson	Development	6 January 1977	6 January 1981	Jenkins	PS	PES
Claude Cheysson	Development	6 January 1981	23 April 1981	Thorn	PS	PES
Claude Cheysson	Mediterranean Policy and North-South Relations	5 January 1985	5 January 1989	Delors I	PS	PES
Edgard Pisani	Development	26 May 1981	3 December 1984	Thorn	PS	PES
Jacques Delors	President	5 January 1985	5 January 1989	Delors I	PS	PES
Jacques Delors	President	6 January 1989	4 January 1993	Delors II	PS	PES
Jacques Delors	President	5 January 1993	23 January 1995	Delors III	PS	PES
Christiane Scrivener	Taxation and Customs Union	6 January 1989	4 January 1993	Delors II	PR	ALDE
Christiane Scrivener	Taxation, Customs Union and Consumer Protection	5 January 1993	23 January 1995	Delors III	PR	ALDE
Yves-Thibault de Silguy	Economic and Financial Affairs, Credit and Investment	23 January 1995	15 September 1999	Santer	RPR	EPP
Édith Cresson	Research, Science, Technological Development, Education, Culture, Multilingualism and Youth	23 January 1995	15 September 1999	Santer	PS	PES
Pascal Lamy	Trade	16 September 1999	21 November 2004	Prodi	PS	PES
Michel Barnier	Regional Policy	16 September 1999	31 March 2004	Prodi	UMP	EPP
Jacques Barrot	Regional Policy	31 March 2004	21 November 2004	Prodi	UMP	EPP
Jacques Barrot	Transport (Vice President)	22 November 2004	9 May 2008	Barroso I	UMP	EPP
Jacques Barrot	Justice, Freedom and Security (Vice President)	9 May 2008	9 February 2010	Barroso I	UMP	EPP
Michel Barnier	Internal Market and Services (Vice President)	9 February 2010	31 October 2014	Barroso II	UMP	EPP
Michel Barnier	Industry and Entrepreneurship (acting)	19 April 2014	25 May 2014	Barroso II	UMP	EPP
Michel Barnier	Industry and Entrepreneurship (acting)	1 July 2014	16 July 2014	Barroso II	UMP	EPP
Pierre Moscovici	Economic and Financial Affairs, Taxation and Customs	1 November 2014	30 November 2019	Juncker	PS	PES
Thierry Breton	Internal Market	1 December 2019	30 November 2024	Von der Leyen I	Ind.	ALDE
Stéphane Séjourné	Prosperity and Industrial Strategy (Vice President)	1 December 2024	present	Von der Leyen II	RE	Ind.

=== Germany ===
Name	Portfolio	Start	End	Commission	National party	European party
Walter Hallstein	President	7 January 1958	9 January 1962	Hallstein I	CDU	EPP
Walter Hallstein	President	9 January 1962	30 June 1967	Hallstein II	CDU	EPP
Hans von der Groeben	Competition	7 January 1958	9 January 1962	Hallstein I	CDU	EPP
Hans von der Groeben	Competition	9 January 1962	30 June 1967	Hallstein II	CDU	EPP
Hans von der Groeben	Internal Market and Regional Policy	2 July 1967	30 June 1970	Rey	CDU	EPP
Fritz Hellwig	Research, Technology and Information Distribution (Vice President)	2 July 1967	30 June 1970	Rey	CDU	EPP
Wilhelm Haferkamp	Energy (Vice President)	2 July 1967	30 June 1970	Rey	SPD	PES
Wilhelm Haferkamp	Internal Market and Energy (Vice President)	1 July 1970	21 March 1972	Malfatti	SPD	PES
Wilhelm Haferkamp	Internal Market and Energy (Vice President)	22 March 1972	5 January 1973	Mansholt	SPD	PES
Wilhelm Haferkamp	Economics, Finance, Credit and Investment (Vice President)	6 January 1973	5 January 1977	Ortoli	SPD	PES
Wilhelm Haferkamp	External Relations (Vice President)	6 January 1977	6 January 1981	Jenkins	SPD	PES
Wilhelm Haferkamp	External Relations and Nuclear Affairs (Vice President)	6 January 1981	5 January 1985	Thorn	SPD	PES
Ralf Dahrendorf	External Relations and Trade	1 July 1970	21 March 1972	Malfatti	FDP	ALDE
Ralf Dahrendorf	External Relations and Trade	22 March 1972	5 January 1973	Mansholt	FDP	ALDE
Ralf Dahrendorf	Research, Science and Education	6 January 1973	5 January 1977	Ortoli	FDP	ALDE
Guido Brunner	Energy, Research, Science and Education	6 January 1977	6 January 1981	Jenkins	FDP	ALDE
Karl-Heinz Narjes	Internal Market, Industrial Innovation, Customs Union, Environment, Consumer Protection, and Nuclear Safety	6 January 1981	5 January 1985	Thorn	CDU	EPP
Karl-Heinz Narjes	Industrial Affairs, Information Technology, Research and Science (Vice President)	5 January 1985	5 January 1989	Delors I	CDU	EPP
Alois Pfeiffer	Economic Affairs, Employment, Credit and Investment	5 January 1985	5 January 1986	Delors I	SPD	PES
Alois Pfeiffer	Economic Affairs and Regional Policy	5 January 1986	1 August 1987	Delors I	SPD	PES
Peter Schmidhuber	Economic Affairs and Regional Policy	2 September 1987	5 January 1989	Delors I	CSU	EPP
Peter Schmidhuber	Budget and Financial Control	6 January 1989	4 January 1993	Delors II	CSU	EPP
Peter Schmidhuber	Budget and Financial Control	5 January 1993	23 January 1995	Delors III	CSU	EPP
Martin Bangemann	Internal Market, Industrial Affairs and Parliamentary Relations (Vice President)	6 January 1989	4 January 1993	Delors II	FDP	ALDE
Martin Bangemann	Industrial Affairs, Information Technology and Telecommunications (Vice President)	5 January 1993	23 January 1995	Delors III	FDP	ALDE
Martin Bangemann	Industrial Affairs, Information and Telecommunications Technologies	23 January 1995	15 September 1999	Santer	FDP	ALDE
Monika Wulf-Mathies	Regional Policy	23 January 1995	15 September 1999	Santer	SPD	PES
Michaele Schreyer	Budget	16 September 1999	21 November 2004	Prodi	Greens	EGP
Günter Verheugen	Enlargement	16 September 1999	21 November 2004	Prodi	SPD	PES
Günter Verheugen	Enterprise and Industry (Vice President)	22 November 2004	9 February 2010	Barroso I	SPD	PES
Günther Oettinger	Energy (Vice President)	9 February 2010	31 October 2014	Barroso II	CDU	EPP
Günther Oettinger	Digital Economy and Society	1 November 2014	1 January 2017	Juncker	CDU	EPP
Günther Oettinger	Budget and Human Resources	1 January 2017	30 November 2019	Juncker	CDU	EPP
Ursula von der Leyen	President	1 December 2019	30 November 2024	Von der Leyen I	CDU	EPP
Ursula von der Leyen	President	1 December 2024	present	Von der Leyen II	CDU	EPP

=== Greece ===
Name	Portfolio	Start	End	Commission	National party	European party
Giorgos Kontogeorgis	Transport, Fisheries and Tourism	6 January 1981	5 January 1985	Thorn	ND	EPP
Grigoris Varfis	Regional Policy and Parliamentary Relations	5 January 1985	5 January 1986	Delors I	PASOK	PES
Grigoris Varfis	Consumer Protection	5 January 1986	5 January 1989	Delors I	PASOK	PES
Vasso Papandreou	Employment, Industrial Relations, Social Affairs, Education, Training and Youth	6 January 1989	4 January 1993	Delors II	PASOK	PES
Ioannis Paleokrassas	Environment, Nuclear Safety and Fisheries	5 January 1993	23 January 1995	Delors III	ND	EPP
Christos Papoutsis	Energy, SMEs and Tourism	23 January 1995	15 September 1999	Santer	PASOK	PES
Anna Diamantopoulou	Employment and Social Affairs	16 September 1999	18 February 2004	Prodi	PASOK	PES
Stavros Dimas	Employment and Social Affairs	10 March 2004	21 November 2004	Prodi	ND	EPP
Stavros Dimas	Environment	22 November 2004	9 February 2010	Barroso I	ND	EPP
Maria Damanaki	Maritime Affairs and Fisheries	9 February 2010	31 October 2014	Barroso II	PASOK	PES
Dimitris Avramopoulos	Migration, Home Affairs and Citizenship	1 November 2014	30 November 2019	Juncker	ND	EPP
Margaritis Schinas	Promoting Our European Way of Life (Vice President)	1 December 2019	30 November 2024	Von der Leyen I	ND	EPP
Margaritis Schinas	Culture, Education and Youth (acting)	10 May 2023	19 September 2023	Von der Leyen I	ND	EPP
Margaritis Schinas	Innovation and Research (acting)	5 September 2023	19 September 2023	Von der Leyen I	ND	EPP
Margaritis Schinas	International Partnerships (acting)	2 December 2023	28 January 2024	Von der Leyen I	ND	EPP
Apostolos Tzitzikostas	Sustainable Transport and Tourism	1 December 2024	present	Von der Leyen II	ND	EPP

=== Hungary ===
Name	Portfolio	Start	End	Commission	National party	European party
Péter Balázs	Regional Policy	1 May 2004	21 November 2004	Prodi	MSZP	PES
László Kovács	Taxation and Customs Union	22 November 2004	9 February 2010	Barroso I	MSZP	PES
László Andor	Employment, Social Affairs and Inclusion	9 February 2010	31 October 2014	Barroso II	MSZP	PES
László Andor	Consumer Protection (acting)	19 April 2014	25 May 2014	Barroso II	MSZP	PES
Tibor Navracsics	Education, Culture, Youth and Sport	1 November 2014	30 November 2019	Juncker	Fidesz	EPP
Olivér Várhelyi	Neighbourhood and Enlargement	1 December 2019	30 November 2024	Von der Leyen I	Fidesz	EPP
Olivér Várhelyi	Health and Animal Welfare	1 December 2024	present	Von der Leyen II	Ind.	Ind.

=== Ireland ===
Name	Portfolio	Start	End	Commission	National party	European party
Patrick Hillery	Social Affairs (Vice President)	6 January 1973	2 December 1976	Ortoli	FF	ALDE
Richard Burke	Taxation, Consumer Affairs, Transport and Parliamentary Relations	6 January 1977	6 January 1981	Jenkins	FG	EPP
Michael O'Kennedy	Personnel and Administration	6 January 1981	3 March 1982	Thorn	FF	ALDE
Richard Burke	Personnel and Administration	1 April 1982	5 January 1985	Thorn	FG	EPP
Peter Sutherland	Competition, Social Affairs, Education and Training	5 January 1985	5 January 1986	Delors I	FG	EPP
Peter Sutherland	Competition and Parliamentary Relations	5 January 1986	5 January 1989	Delors I	FG	EPP
Ray MacSharry	Agriculture and Rural Development	6 January 1989	4 January 1993	Delors II	FF	ALDE
Pádraig Flynn	Social Affairs, Employment, Immigration, Home Affairs and Justice	5 January 1993	23 January 1995	Delors III	FF	ALDE
Pádraig Flynn	Social Affairs and Employment	23 January 1995	15 September 1999	Santer	FF	ALDE
David Byrne	Health and Consumer Protection	16 September 1999	21 November 2004	Prodi	FF	ALDE
Charlie McCreevy	Internal Market and Services	22 November 2004	9 February 2010	Barroso I	FF	ALDE
Máire Geoghegan-Quinn	Research, Innovation and Science	9 February 2010	31 October 2014	Barroso II	FF	ALDE
Phil Hogan	Agriculture and Rural Development	1 November 2014	30 November 2019	Juncker	FG	EPP
Phil Hogan	Trade	1 December 2019	26 August 2020	Von der Leyen I	FG	EPP
Mairead McGuinness	Financial Stability, Financial Services and the Capital Markets Union	12 October 2020	30 November 2024	Von der Leyen I	FG	EPP
Michael McGrath	Democracy, Justice and the Rule of Law	1 December 2024	present	Von der Leyen II	FF	ALDE

=== Italy ===
Name	Portfolio	Start	End	Commission	National party	European party
Piero Malvestiti	Internal Market (Vice President)	7 January 1958	15 September 1959	Hallstein I	DC	EPP
Giuseppe Petrilli	Social Affairs	7 January 1958	8 February 1961	Hallstein I	DC	EPP
Giuseppe Caron	Internal Market	24 November 1959	9 January 1962	Hallstein I	DC	EPP
Giuseppe Caron	Internal Market (Vice President)	9 January 1962	15 May 1963	Hallstein II	DC	EPP
Lionello Levi Sandri	Social Affairs	8 February 1961	9 January 1962	Hallstein I	PSI	PES
Lionello Levi Sandri	Social Affairs (Vice President)	9 January 1962	30 June 1967	Hallstein II	PSI	PES
Lionello Levi Sandri	Social Affairs, Personnel and Administration (Vice President)	2 July 1967	30 June 1970	Rey	PSI	PES
Guido Colonna di Paliano	Internal Market	30 July 1964	30 June 1967	Hallstein II	DC	EPP
Guido Colonna di Paliano	Industrial Affairs	2 July 1967	8 May 1970	Rey	DC	EPP
Edoardo Martino	External Relations	2 July 1967	30 June 1970	Rey	DC	EPP
Franco Maria Malfatti	President	1 July 1970	21 March 1972	Malfatti	DC	EPP
Altiero Spinelli	Industry, Technology, Training, Education and Customs Union	1 July 1970	21 March 1972	Malfatti	SI	PES
Altiero Spinelli	Industry, Technology, Training, Education and Customs Union	22 March 1972	5 January 1973	Mansholt	SI	PES
Altiero Spinelli	Industry and Technology	6 January 1973	13 July 1976	Ortoli	SI	PES
Carlo Scarascia-Mugnozza	Agriculture (Vice President)	22 March 1972	5 January 1973	Mansholt	DC	EPP
Carlo Scarascia-Mugnozza	Parliamentary Affairs, Environment, Consumer Interests, Transport and Information (Vice President)	6 January 1973	5 January 1977	Ortoli	DC	EPP
Cesidio Guazzaroni	Industry and Technology	13 July 1976	5 January 1977	Ortoli	PRI	ALDE
Antonio Giolitti	Regional Policy	6 January 1977	6 January 1981	Jenkins	PSI	PES
Antonio Giolitti	Regional Policy	6 January 1981	5 January 1985	Thorn	PSI	PES
Lorenzo Natali	Enlargement, Environment and Nuclear Safety	6 January 1977	6 January 1981	Jenkins	DC	EPP
Lorenzo Natali	Mediterranean Policy, Enlargement and Information (Vice President)	6 January 1981	5 January 1985	Thorn	DC	EPP
Lorenzo Natali	Cooperation, Development and Enlargement (Vice President)	5 January 1985	5 January 1989	Delors I	DC	EPP
Carlo Ripa di Meana	Institutional Reform, Information, Culture and Tourism	5 January 1985	5 January 1989	Delors I	PSI	PES
Carlo Ripa di Meana	Environment and Nuclear Safety	6 January 1989	4 January 1993	Delors II	PSI	PES
Filippo Maria Pandolfi	Science, Research, Development, Telecommunications, Information Technology and Innovation (Vice President)	6 January 1989	4 January 1993	Delors II	DC	EPP
Antonio Ruberti	Science, Research, Technological Development, Education, Training and Youth (Vice President)	5 January 1993	23 January 1995	Delors III	PSI	PES
Raniero Vanni d'Archirafi	Institutional Reform, Internal Market, Financial Services, Enterprise and SMEs	5 January 1993	23 January 1995	Delors III	DC	EPP
Emma Bonino	Fisheries and Consumers Policy	23 January 1995	15 September 1999	Santer	LB	ALDE
Mario Monti	Internal Market, Financial Services, Customs and Taxation	23 January 1995	15 September 1999	Santer	Ind.	ALDE
Mario Monti	Competition	16 September 1999	21 November 2004	Prodi	Ind.	ALDE
Romano Prodi	President	16 September 1999	21 November 2004	Prodi	ID / DL	ALDE
Franco Frattini	Justice, Freedom and Security (Vice President)	22 November 2004	23 April 2008	Barroso I	FI	EPP
Antonio Tajani	Transport (Vice President)	18 June 2008	9 February 2010	Barroso I	PdL	EPP
Antonio Tajani	Industry and Entrepreneurship (Vice President)	9 February 2010	1 July 2014	Barroso II	PdL	EPP
Ferdinando Nelli Feroci	Industry and Entrepreneurship	16 July 2014	31 October 2014	Barroso II	Ind.	EPP
Federica Mogherini	Foreign Affairs and Security Policy (Vice President)	1 November 2014	30 November 2019	Juncker	PD	PES
Paolo Gentiloni	Economy	1 December 2019	30 November 2024	Von der Leyen I	PD	PES
Raffaele Fitto	Cohesion and Reforms (Executive Vice President)	1 December 2024	present	Von der Leyen II	FdL	ECR

=== Latvia ===
Name	Portfolio	Start	End	Commission	National party	European party
Sandra Kalniete	Agriculture, Rural Development and Fisheries	1 May 2004	21 November 2004	Prodi	LTF	EPP
Andris Piebalgs	Energy	22 November 2004	9 February 2010	Barroso I	LC / LPP	ALDE
Andris Piebalgs	Development	9 February 2010	31 October 2014	Barroso II	LC / LPP	ALDE
Andris Piebalgs	Financial Programming and the Budget (acting)	19 April 2014	25 May 2014	Barroso II	LC / LPP	ALDE
Andris Piebalgs	Financial Programming and the Budget (acting)	1 July 2014	16 July 2014	Barroso II	LC / LPP	ALDE
Valdis Dombrovskis	Euro and Social Dialogue (Vice President)	1 November 2014	16 July 2016	Juncker	V	EPP
Valdis Dombrovskis	Euro, Social Dialogue, Financial Stability, Financial Services and Capital Markets Union (Vice President)	16 July 2016	1 December 2019	Juncker	V	EPP
Valdis Dombrovskis	An Economy That Works for People (Executive Vice President)	1 December 2019	30 November 2024	Von der Leyen I	V	EPP
Valdis Dombrovskis	Financial Stability, Financial Services and Capital Markets Union	1 December 2019	12 October 2020	Von der Leyen I	V	EPP
Valdis Dombrovskis	Trade	26 August 2020	30 November 2024	Von der Leyen I	V	EPP
Valdis Dombrovskis	Economy and Productivity; Implementation and Simplification	1 December 2024	present	Von der Leyen II	V	EPP

=== Lithuania ===
Name	Portfolio	Start	End	Commission	National party	European party
Dalia Grybauskaitė	Education and Culture	1 May 2004	21 November 2004	Prodi	Ind.	EPP
Dalia Grybauskaitė	Financial Programming and the Budget	22 November 2004	1 July 2009	Barroso I	Ind.	EPP
Algirdas Šemeta	Financial Programming and the Budget	1 July 2009	9 February 2010	Barroso I	TS	EPP
Algirdas Šemeta	Taxation and Customs Union, Audit and Anti-Fraud	9 February 2010	31 October 2014	Barroso II	TS	EPP
Vytenis Andriukaitis	Health and Food Safety	1 November 2014	30 November 2019	Juncker	SDP	PES
Virginijus Sinkevičius	Environment, Oceans and Fisheries	1 December 2019	16 July 2024	Von der Leyen I	LVŽS / DSVL	EGP
Andrius Kubilius	Defence and Space	1 December 2024	present	Von der Leyen II	TS–LKD	EPP

=== Luxembourg ===
Name	Portfolio	Start	End	Commission	National party	European party
Michel Rasquin	Transport	7 January 1958	27 April 1958	Hallstein I	LSAP	PES
Lambert Schaus	Transport	18 June 1958	9 January 1962	Hallstein I	CSV	EPP
Lambert Schaus	Transport	9 January 1962	30 June 1967	Hallstein II	CSV	EPP
Victor Bodson	Transport	2 July 1967	30 June 1970	Rey	LSAP	PES
Albert Borschette	Competition, Press, Information and Regional Policy	1 July 1970	21 March 1972	Malfatti	Unknown	
Albert Borschette	Competition, Press, Information and Regional Policy	22 March 1972	5 January 1973	Mansholt	Unknown	
Albert Borschette	Competition, Personnel and Administration	6 January 1973	5 January 1977	Ortoli	Unknown	
Raymond Vouel	Competition	6 January 1977	6 January 1981	Jenkins	LSAP	PES
Gaston Thorn	President	6 January 1981	5 January 1985	Thorn	DP	ALDE
Nicolas Mosar	Energy	5 January 1985	5 January 1989	Delors I	CSV	EPP
Jean Dondelinger	Cultural Affairs and Information	6 January 1989	4 January 1993	Delors II	Unknown	
René Steichen	Agriculture and Rural Development	5 January 1993	23 January 1995	Delors III	CSV	EPP
Jacques Santer	President	23 January 1995	15 March 1999	Santer	CSV	EPP
Viviane Reding	Education and Culture	16 September 1999	21 November 2004	Prodi	CSV	EPP
Viviane Reding	Information Society and Media	22 November 2004	9 February 2010	Barroso I	CSV	EPP
Viviane Reding	Justice, Fundamental Rights and Citizenship (Vice President)	9 February 2010	1 July 2014	Barroso II	CSV	EPP
Martine Reicherts	Justice, Fundamental Rights and Citizenship	16 July 2014	31 October 2014	Barroso II	CSV	EPP
Jean-Claude Juncker	President	1 November 2014	30 November 2019	Juncker	CSV	EPP
Nicolas Schmit	Jobs and Social Rights	1 December 2019	30 November 2024	Von der Leyen I	LSAP	PES
Christophe Hansen	Agriculture and Food	1 December 2024	present	Von der Leyen II	CSV	'EPP

=== Malta ===
Name	Portfolio	Start	End	Commission	National party	European party
Joe Borg	Development and Humanitarian Aid	1 May 2004	21 November 2004	Prodi	PN	EPP
Joe Borg	Fisheries and Maritime Affairs	22 November 2004	9 February 2010	Barroso I	PN	EPP
John Dalli	Health and Consumer Policy	9 February 2010	16 October 2012	Barroso II	PN	EPP
Tonio Borg	Health and Consumer Policy	28 November 2012	1 July 2013	Barroso II	PN	EPP
Tonio Borg	Health	1 July 2013	31 October 2014	Barroso II	PN	EPP
Karmenu Vella	Environment, Maritime Affairs and Fisheries	1 November 2014	30 November 2019	Juncker	PL	PES
Helena Dalli	Equality	1 December 2019	30 November 2024	Von der Leyen I	PL	PES
Glenn Micallef	Intergenerational Fairness, Youth, Culture and Sport	1 December 2024	present	Von der Leyen II	PL	PES

=== Netherlands ===
Name	Portfolio	Start	End	Commission	National party	European party
Sicco Mansholt	Agriculture (Vice President)	7 January 1958	9 January 1962	Hallstein I	PvdA	PES
Sicco Mansholt	Agriculture (Vice President)	9 January 1962	30 June 1967	Hallstein II	PvdA	PES
Sicco Mansholt	Agriculture (Vice President)	2 July 1967	30 June 1970	Rey	PvdA	PES
Sicco Mansholt	Agriculture (Vice President)	1 July 1970	21 March 1972	Malfatti	PvdA	PES
Sicco Mansholt	President	22 March 1972	5 January 1973	Mansholt	PvdA	PES
Maan Sassen	Competition	2 July 1967	30 June 1970	Rey	KVP	EPP
Pierre Lardinois	Agriculture	6 January 1973	5 January 1977	Ortoli	KVP	EPP
Henk Vredeling	Employment and Social Affairs (Vice President)	6 January 1977	6 January 1981	Jenkins	PvdA	PES
Frans Andriessen	Parliamentary Relations and Competition	6 January 1981	5 January 1985	Thorn	KVP	EPP
Frans Andriessen	Agriculture and Fisheries (Vice President)	5 January 1985	5 January 1986	Delors I	KVP	EPP
Frans Andriessen	Agriculture (Vice President)	5 January 1986	5 January 1989	Delors I	KVP	EPP
Frans Andriessen	External Relations and Trade (Vice President)	6 January 1989	4 January 1993	Delors II	KVP	EPP
Hans van den Broek	External Relations and Enlargement	5 January 1993	23 January 1995	Delors III	CDA	EPP
Hans van den Broek	Central and Eastern European Relations and Enlargement	23 January 1995	15 September 1999	Santer	CDA	EPP
Frits Bolkestein	Internal Market	16 September 1999	21 November 2004	Prodi	VVD	ALDE
Neelie Kroes	Competition	22 November 2004	9 February 2010	Barroso I	VVD	ALDE
Neelie Kroes	Digital Agenda (Vice President)	9 February 2010	31 October 2014	Barroso II	VVD	ALDE
Frans Timmermans	Better Regulation, Interinstitutional Relations, Rule of Law and Charter of Fundamental Rights (First Vice President)	1 November 2014	30 November 2019	Juncker	PvdA	PES
Frans Timmermans	European Green Deal and Climate Action (Executive Vice President)	1 December 2019	22 August 2023	Von der Leyen I	PvdA	PES
Wopke Hoekstra	Climate Action	9 October 2023	30 November 2024	Von der Leyen I	CDA	EPP
Wopke Hoekstra	Transport (acting)	15 July 2024	30 November 2024	Von der Leyen I	CDA	EPP
Wopke Hoekstra	Climate, Net-Zero and Clean Growth	1 December 2024	present	Von der Leyen II	CDA	EPP

=== Poland ===
Name	Portfolio	Start	End	Commission	National party	European party
Danuta Hübner	Trade	1 May 2004	21 November 2004	Prodi	Independent	PES
Danuta Hübner	Regional Policy	22 November 2004	4 July 2009	Barroso I	Independent	PES
Paweł Samecki	Regional Policy	4 July 2009	9 February 2010	Barroso I	PO	EPP
Janusz Lewandowski	Financial Programming and Budget	9 February 2010	1 July 2014	Barroso II	PO	EPP
Jacek Dominik	Financial Programming and Budget	16 July 2014	31 October 2014	Barroso II	PO	EPP
Elżbieta Bieńkowska	Internal Market, Industry, Entrepreneurship and SMEs	1 November 2014	30 November 2019	Juncker	PO	EPP
Janusz Wojciechowski	Agriculture	1 December 2019	30 November 2024	Von der Leyen I	PiS	ECR
Piotr Serafin	Budget, Anti-Fraud and Public Administration	1 December 2024	present	Von der Leyen II	KO	EPP

=== Portugal ===
Name	Portfolio	Start	End	Commission	National party	European party
António Cardoso e Cunha	Fisheries	5 January 1986	5 January 1989	Delors I	PSD	EPP
António Cardoso e Cunha	Personnel, Administration, Energy, Small Business and Tourism	6 January 1989	4 January 1993	Delors II	PSD	EPP
João de Deus Pinheiro	Parliamentary Relations, Communications, Information and Cultural Affairs	5 January 1993	23 January 1995	Delors III	PSD	EPP
João de Deus Pinheiro	African, Caribbean and Asian Relations and Development	23 January 1995	15 September 1999	Santer	PSD	EPP
António Vitorino	Justice and Home Affairs	16 September 1999	21 November 2004	Prodi	PS	PES
José Manuel Barroso	President	22 November 2004	9 February 2010	Barroso I	PSD	EPP
José Manuel Barroso	President	9 February 2010	31 October 2014	Barroso II	PSD	EPP
José Manuel Barroso	Interinstitutional Relations and Administration (acting)	19 April 2014	25 May 2014	Barroso II	PSD	EPP
Carlos Moedas	Research, Science and Innovation	1 November 2014	30 November 2019	Juncker	PSD	EPP
Elisa Ferreira	Cohesion and Reforms	1 December 2019	30 November 2024	Von der Leyen I	PS	PES
Maria Luís Albuquerque	Financial Services and the Savings and Investments Union	1 December 2024	present	Von der Leyen II	PSD	EPP

=== Romania ===
Name	Portfolio	Start	End	Commission	National party	European party
Leonard Orban	Multilingualism	1 January 2007	9 February 2010	Barroso I	PNL	ALDE
Dacian Cioloș	Agriculture and Rural Development	9 February 2010	31 October 2014	Barroso II	Ind.	EPP
Corina Crețu	Regional Policy	1 November 2014	1 July 2019	Juncker	PSD / PRO	PES / EDP
Adina-Ioana Vălean	Transport	1 December 2019	15 July 2024	Von der Leyen I	PNL	EPP
Roxana Mînzatu	Social Rights and Skills, Quality Jobs and Preparedness (Executive Vice President)	1 December 2024	present	Von der Leyen II	PSD	PES

=== Slovakia ===
Name	Portfolio	Start	End	Commission	National party	European party
Ján Figeľ	Enterprise and Information Society	1 May 2004	21 November 2004	Prodi	KDH	EPP
Ján Figeľ	Education, Training, Culture and Multilingualism	22 November 2004	1 January 2007	Barroso I	KDH	EPP
Ján Figeľ	Education, Training and Culture	1 January 2007	1 October 2009	Barroso I	KDH	EPP
Maroš Šefčovič	Education, Training and Culture	1 October 2009	9 February 2010	Barroso I	Smer	PES
Maroš Šefčovič	Interinstitutional Relations and Administration (Vice President)	9 February 2010	31 October 2014	Barroso II	Smer	PES
Maroš Šefčovič	Health and Consumer Policy (acting)	16 October 2012	28 November 2012	Barroso II	Smer	PES
Maroš Šefčovič	Energy Union (Vice President)	1 November 2014	30 November 2019	Juncker	Smer	PES
Maroš Šefčovič	Digital Single Market (acting)	3 July 2019	30 November 2019	Juncker	Smer	PES
Maroš Šefčovič	Interinstitutional Relations and Foresight (Vice President)	1 December 2019	30 November 2024	Von der Leyen I	Smer	PES
Maroš Šefčovič	European Green Deal (Executive Vice President)	22 August 2023	30 November 2024	Von der Leyen I	Smer	PES
Maroš Šefčovič	Climate Action (acting)	22 August 2023	9 October 2023	Von der Leyen I	Smer	PES
Maroš Šefčovič	Environment, Oceans and Fisheries (acting)	16 July 2024	30 November 2024	Von der Leyen I	Smer	PES
Maroš Šefčovič	Trade and Economic Security; Interinstitutional Relations and Transparency	1 December 2024	present	Von der Leyen II	Smer	PES

=== Slovenia ===
Name	Portfolio	Start	End	Commission	National party	European party
Janez Potočnik	Enlargement	1 May 2004	21 November 2004	Prodi	LDS	ALDE
Janez Potočnik	Science and Research	22 November 2004	9 February 2010	Barroso I	LDS	ALDE
Janez Potočnik	Environment	9 February 2010	31 October 2014	Barroso II	LDS	ALDE
Violeta Bulc	Transport	1 November 2014	30 November 2019	Juncker	SMC	ALDE
Janez Lenarčič	Crisis Management	1 December 2019	30 November 2024	Von der Leyen I	Ind.	ALDE
Marta Kos	Enlargement	1 December 2024	present	Von der Leyen II	Ind.	Ind.

=== Spain ===
Name	Portfolio	Start	End	Commission	National party	European party
Abel Matutes	Credit, Investments, Financial Instruments and SMEs	5 January 1986	5 January 1989	Delors I	PP	EPP
Abel Matutes	Mediterranean and Latin American Policy	6 January 1989	4 January 1993	Delors II	PP	EPP
Abel Matutes	Energy and Transport	5 January 1993	27 April 1994	Delors III	PP	EPP
Manuel Marín	Social Affairs, Employment, Education and Training (Vice President)	5 January 1986	5 January 1989	Delors I	PSOE	PES
Manuel Marín	Cooperation, Development and Fisheries (Vice President)	6 January 1989	4 January 1993	Delors II	PSOE	PES
Manuel Marín	Cooperation, Development and Humanitarian Aid (Vice President)	5 January 1993	23 January 1995	Delors III	PSOE	PES
Manuel Marín	Mediterranean, Latin American and Middle Eastern Relations (Vice President)	23 January 1995	15 September 1999	Santer	PSOE	PES
Manuel Marín	President (acting)	16 March 1999	15 September 1999	Santer	PSOE	PES
Marcelino Oreja	Energy and Transport	27 April 1994	23 January 1995	Delors III	PP	EPP
Marcelino Oreja	Parliamentary Relations, Culture and Audiovisual Policy and Institutional Reform	23 January 1995	15 September 1999	Santer	PP	EPP
Loyola de Palacio	Parliamentary Relations, Transport and Energy (Vice President)	16 September 1999	21 November 2004	Prodi	PP	EPP
Pedro Solbes	Economic and Monetary Affairs	16 September 1999	10 April 2004	Prodi	PSOE	PES
Joaquín Almunia	Economic and Monetary Affairs	24 April 2004	21 November 2004	Prodi	PSOE	PES
Joaquín Almunia	Economic and Financial Affairs	22 November 2004	9 February 2010	Barroso I	PSOE	PES
Joaquín Almunia	Competition (Vice President)	9 February 2010	31 October 2014	Barroso II	PSOE	PES
Miguel Arias Cañete	Climate Action and Energy	1 November 2014	30 November 2019	Juncker	PP	EPP
Miguel Arias Cañete	Energy Union (acting)	18 January 2019	30 March 2019	Juncker	PP	EPP
Josep Borrell	A Stronger Europe in the World and Foreign Affairs and Security Policy (Vice President)	1 December 2019	30 November 2024	Von der Leyen I	PSOE	PES
Teresa Ribera	Clean, Just and Competitive Transition (Executive Vice President)	1 December 2024	present	Von der Leyen II	PSOE	PES

=== Sweden ===
Name	Portfolio	Start	End	Commission	National party	European party
Anita Gradin	Immigration, Justice, Home Affairs and Financial Control	23 January 1995	15 September 1999	Santer	SAP	PES
Margot Wallström	Environment	16 September 1999	21 November 2004	Prodi	SAP	PES
Margot Wallström	Institutional Relations and Communication Strategy (First Vice President)	22 November 2004	9 February 2010	Barroso I	SAP	PES
Cecilia Malmström	Home Affairs	9 February 2010	31 October 2014	Barroso II	FP	ALDE
Cecilia Malmström	Trade	1 November 2014	30 November 2019	Juncker	FP	ALDE
Ylva Johansson	Home Affairs	1 December 2019	30 November 2024	Von der Leyen I	SAP	PES
Jessika Roswall	Environment, Water Resilience and a Competitive Circular Economy	1 December 2024	present	Von der Leyen II	M	EPP

=== United Kingdom ===
Name	Portfolio	Start	End	Commission	National party	European party
Christopher Soames	External Relations (Vice President)	6 January 1973	5 January 1977	Ortoli	Con.	EPP
George Thomson	Regional Policy	6 January 1973	5 January 1977	Ortoli	Lab.	PES
Roy Jenkins	President	6 January 1977	6 January 1981	Jenkins	Lab.	PES
Christopher Tugendhat	Budget, Financial Control and Financial Institutions	6 January 1977	6 January 1981	Jenkins	Con.	EPP
Christopher Tugendhat	Budget, Financial Control, Financial Institutions, Personnel and Administration (Vice President)	6 January 1981	5 January 1985	Thorn	Con.	EPP
Ivor Richard	Employment, Social Affairs, Education and Training	6 January 1981	5 January 1985	Thorn	Lab.	PES
Arthur Cockfield	Internal Market, Customs Union and Taxation (Vice President)	5 January 1985	5 January 1989	Delors I	Con.	EPP
Stanley Clinton-Davis	Environment, Consumer Protection, Nuclear Safety and Transport	5 January 1985	5 January 1986	Delors I	Lab.	PES
Stanley Clinton-Davis	Environment, Nuclear Safety and Transport	5 January 1986	5 January 1989	Delors I	Lab.	PES
Bruce Millan	Regional Policy	6 January 1989	4 January 1993	Delors II	Lab.	PES
Bruce Millan	Regional Policy	5 January 1993	23 January 1995	Delors III	Lab.	PES
Leon Brittan	Competition and Financial Institutions (Vice President)	6 January 1989	4 January 1993	Delors II	Con.	EPP
Leon Brittan	Trade (Vice President)	5 January 1993	23 January 1995	Delors III	Con.	EPP
Leon Brittan	External Relations and Trade (Vice President)	23 January 1995	15 September 1999	Santer	Con.	EPP
Neil Kinnock	Transport	23 January 1995	15 September 1999	Santer	Lab.	PES
Neil Kinnock	Administrative Reform (Vice President)	16 September 1999	21 November 2004	Prodi	Lab.	PES
Chris Patten	External Relations	16 September 1999	21 November 2004	Prodi	Con.	EPP
Peter Mandelson	Trade	22 November 2004	3 October 2008	Barroso I	Lab.	PES
Catherine Ashton	Trade	24 October 2008	1 December 2009	Barroso I	Lab.	PES
Catherine Ashton	Foreign Affairs and Security Policy	1 December 2009	9 February 2010	Barroso I	Lab.	PES
Catherine Ashton	Foreign Affairs and Security Policy (First Vice President)	9 February 2010	31 October 2014	Barroso II	Lab.	PES
Jonathan Hill	Financial Stability, Financial Services and Capital Markets Union	1 November 2014	16 July 2016	Juncker	Con.	ECR
Julian King	Security Union	19 September 2016	30 November 2019	Juncker	Con.	ECR

== Withdrawn nominees ==
=== Portfolio assigned ===
A number of commissioners were formally nominated and assigned portfolios before being withdrawn after their hearing with the European Parliament, with the exception of Thorvald Stoltenberg, who withdrew after the rejection of Norway's accession referendum.

State	Name	Portfolio	Commission	Year	Party	Family
Norway	Thorvald Stoltenberg	Fisheries	Santer	1994	AP	PES
Czech Republic	Miloš Kužvart	Health and Consumer Protection	Prodi	2004	ČSSD	PES
Italy	Rocco Buttiglione	Justice, Freedom and Security (Vice President)	Barroso I	2004	UDC	EPP
Latvia	Ingrīda Ūdre	Taxation and Customs Union	Barroso I	2004	LZS	EGP
Bulgaria	Rumiana Jeleva	International Cooperation, Humanitarian Aid and Crisis Response	Barroso II	2009	GERB	EPP
Slovenia	Alenka Bratušek	Energy Union (Vice President)	Juncker	2014	ZaAB	ALDE
France	Sylvie Goulard	Internal Market	Von der Leyen I	2019	LREM	ALDE
Hungary	László Trócsányi	Neighbourhood and Enlargement	Von der Leyen I	2019	Fidesz	EPP
Romania	Rovana Plumb	Transport	Von der Leyen I	2019	PSD	PES

=== Before hearings held ===
At the end of the Juncker Commission, some were initially named by the member states to succeed commissioners who took seats in the European Parliament before an agreement to not fill the seats under the start of the next commission.

The Von der Leyen I Commission requested member states name female and male candidates in order to have gender parity. She would then chose the one candidate to be formally nominated, or request new names. She usually continued her request for female and male candidates for vacancies throughout her first commission.

State	Name	Commission	Year	Party	Family
Estonia	Kadri Simson	Juncker	2019	EK	ALDE
Romania	Ioan Mircea Pașcu	Juncker	2019	PSD	PES
Poland	Krzysztof Szczerski	Von der Leyen I	2019	PiS	ECR
Portugal	Pedro Marques	Von der Leyen I	2019	PS	PES
Romania	Dan Nica	Von der Leyen I	2019	PSD	PES
Romania	Melania-Gabriela Ciot	Von der Leyen I	2019	PSD	PES
Romania	Victor Negrescu	Von der Leyen I	2019	PSD	PES
Romania	Siegfried Mureșan	Von der Leyen I	2019	PNL	EPP
Ireland	Andrew McDowell	Von der Leyen I	2020	FG	EPP
Bulgaria	Daniel Lorer	Von der Leyen I	2023	PP	ALDE

== European Atomic Energy Community (EAEC) ==
State	Name	Portfolio	Start	End	Commission	Party	Family
France	Louis Armand	President	7 January 1958	2 February 1959	Armand	Unknown	
France	Étienne Hirsch	President	2 February 1959	10 January 1962	Hirsch	Unknown	
France	Pierre Chatenet	President	10 January 1962	5 July 1967	Chatenet	UDR	EPP

== European Coal and Steel Community (ECSC) ==
State	Name	Portfolio	Start	End	Authority	Party	Family
Belgium	Albert Coppé	Long Term Policy (Vice President)	10 August 1952	3 June 1955	Monnet	CVP	EPP
Belgium	Albert Coppé	General Objectives, Long Term Policy, Markets, Agreements and Transport (Vice President)	3 June 1955	13 January 1958	Mayer	CVP	EPP
Belgium	Albert Coppé	General Objectives and Long Term Policy (Vice President)	13 January 1958	15 September 1959	Finet	CVP	EPP
Belgium	Albert Coppé	Member (Vice President)	15 September 1959	22 October 1963	Malvestiti	CVP	EPP
Belgium	Albert Coppé	Transport and Information (Vice President)	22 October 1963	5 July 1967	Del Bo / Coppé	CVP	EPP
Belgium	Albert Coppé	President (acting)	1 March 1967	5 July 1967	Del Bo / Coppé	CVP	EPP
Belgium	Paul Finet	Social Problems and Administrative Questions	10 August 1952	3 June 1955	Monnet	BSP	PES
Belgium	Paul Finet	Social Problems	3 June 1955	13 January 1958	Mayer	BSP	PES
Belgium	Paul Finet	President	13 January 1958	15 September 1959	Finet	BSP	PES
Belgium	Paul Finet	Member	15 September 1959	22 October 1963	Malvestiti	BSP	PES
Belgium	Paul Finet	Social Problems	10 January 1964	18 May 1965	Del Bo	BSP	PES
France	Jean Monnet	President	10 August 1952	3 June 1955	Monnet	Unknown	
France	Léon Daum	Finance, Investment, Production and Instructions	10 August 1952	3 June 1955	Monnet	Unknown	
France	Léon Daum	Finance, Investment, Production and Instructions	3 June 1955	13 January 1958	Mayer	Unknown	
France	Léon Daum	Investment and Production	13 January 1958	15 September 1959	Finet	Unknown	
France	René Mayer	President	3 June 1955	13 January 1958	Mayer	PR	EPP
France	Roger Reynaud	Member	13 January 1958	15 September 1959	Finet	Unknown	
France	Roger Reynaud	Member	15 September 1959	September 1963	Malvestiti	Unknown	
France	Roger Reynaud	Economic Policy and Industrial Development	10 January 1964	5 July 1967	Del Bo / Coppé	Unknown	
France	Pierre-Olivier Lapie	Member	15 September 1959	22 October 1963	Malvestiti	SFIO	PES
France	Pierre-Olivier Lapie	Energy	22 October 1963	5 July 1967	Del Bo / Coppé	SFIO	PES
Germany	Heinz Potthof	Member	10 August 1952	3 June 1955	Monnet	SPD	PES
Germany	Franz Etzel	Markets, Agreements and Transport (First Vice President)	10 August 1952	3 June 1955	Monnet	CDU	EPP
Germany	Franz Etzel	Member (First Vice President)	3 June 1955	28 October 1957	Mayer	CDU	EPP
Germany	Franz Blücher	Member	13 January 1958	15 September 1959	Finet	FDP	ALDE
Germany	Heinz Potthoff	Finance, Budget and Administration	13 January 1958	15 September 1959	Finet	SPD	PES
Germany	Heinz Potthoff	Finance and Investment	15 September 1959	10 August 1962	Malvestiti	SPD	PES
Germany	Karl-Maria Hettlage	Finance and Investment	14 December 1962	22 October 1963	Malvestiti	CDU	EPP
Germany	Karl-Maria Hettlage	Finance and Investment	22 October 1963	5 July 1967	Del Bo / Coppé	CDU	EPP
Germany	Fritz Hellwig	Coal and Steel Markets	10 January 1964	5 July 1967	Del Bo / Coppé	CDU	EPP
Italy	Enzo Giacchero	Press and Information	10 August 1952	3 June 1955	Monnet	DC	EPP
Italy	Enzo Giacchero	Press and Information	3 June 1955	13 January 1958	Mayer	DC	EPP
Italy	Enzo Giacchero	Social Problems	13 January 1958	15 September 1959	Finet	DC	EPP
Italy	Piero Malvestiti	President	15 September 1959	22 October 1963	Malvestiti	DC	EPP
Italy	Rinaldo Del Bo	President	22 October 1963	1 March 1967	Del Bo	DC	EPP
Luxembourg	Albert Wehrer	Member	10 August 1952	3 June 1955	Monnet	Unknown	
Luxembourg	Albert Wehrer	Member	3 June 1955	13 January 1958	Mayer	Unknown	
Luxembourg	Albert Wehrer	External Relations	13 January 1958	15 September 1959	Finet	Unknown	
Luxembourg	Albert Wehrer	Member	15 September 1959	22 October 1963	Malvestiti	Unknown	
Luxembourg	Albert Wehrer	External Relations	22 October 1963	5 July 1967	Del Bo / Coppé	Unknown	
Luxembourg	Jean Fohrmann	Social Problems	30 June 1965	5 July 1967	Del Bo / Coppé	LSAP	PES
Netherlands	Dirk Spierenburg	External Relations	10 August 1952	3 June 1955	Monnet	Unknown	
Netherlands	Dirk Spierenburg	External Relations	3 June 1955	13 January 1958	Mayer	Unknown	
Netherlands	Dirk Spierenburg	Steel, Transport and Concentrations (First Vice President)	13 January 1958	15 September 1959	Finet	Unknown	
Netherlands	Dirk Spierenburg	Member (First Vice President)	15 September 1959	25 September 1962	Malvestiti	Unknown	
Netherlands	Dirk Spierenburg	Competition (First Vice President)	22 October 1963	7 June 1965	Del Bo	Unknown	
Netherlands	Johannes Linthorst Homan	Member (First Vice President)	15 December 1962	22 October 1963	Malvestiti	VVD	ALDE
Netherlands	Johannes Linthorst Homan	Competition	22 October 1963	5 July 1967	Del Bo / Coppé	VVD	ALDE
