= Malvestiti Authority =

The Malvestiti Authority was the fourth High Authority of the European Coal and Steel Community (ECSC), between 1959 and 1963. Its president was Piero Malvestiti of Italy.

There were one more High Authorities before the institutions of the ECSC were merged with those of the European Atomic Energy Community and the European Economic Community in 1967 to become the European Communities.

== Membership ==
In addition to Piero Malvestiti of Italy, as president, the Authority comprised;

Dirk Spierenburg of Netherlands, First Vice-President (until he resigned on 25 September 1962)

Johannes Linthorst Homan of the Netherlands, succeeded Spierenburg as vice president on 15 December 1962.

Albert Coppé of Belgium, Second Vice-President

- Rules of competition (inc. transport)

Paul Finet of Belgium

- Social problems
- Finance and investment
- Economic policy and industrial development

Fritz Hellwig of Germany

Heinz Potthof of Germany (until 10 August 1962)

- Social problems
- Finance and investment

Karl-Maria Hettlage (from 14 December 1962, succeeding Potthof)

- Social problems
- Finance and investment

Pierre-Olivier Lapie of France

- Rules of competition (inc. transport)
- Coordination of energy policies

Roger Reynaud of France

- External relations and information
- Economic policy and industrial development
- Coal and steel markets

Albert Wehrer of Luxembourg

- External relations and information
- Economic policy and industrial development
- Finance and investment
