= Del Bo Authority =

Executive branch of the former European Coal and Steel Community

The Del Bo Authority was the last High Authority of the European Coal and Steel Community (ECSC), between 1963 and 1967. Its president was Rinaldo Del Bo of Italy. Del Bo was briefly followed by Albert Coppé's interim Authority.

There were only five High Authorities, this being the last, before the institutions of the ECSC were merged with those of the European Atomic Energy Community and the European Economic Community in 1967 to become the European Communities.

When they were created, the Authorities of the Atomic Energy and Economic Communities were called "Commissions", and that name was kept after the three bodies merged rather than "High Authority", hence no Authority exists today.

Del Bo's term was until 19 December 1963 but had it extended on 10 January 1964 until 8 March 1967 when he resigned.

== Membership ==
In addition to Rinaldo Del Bo of Italy, as president, the Authority comprised:

Dirk Spierenburg of Netherlands, First Vice-President (until he resigned on 7 June 1965)

- Rules of competition (inc. transport) (Chairman)

Johannes Linthorst Homan of the Netherlands

- Rules of competition (inc. transport) (Chairman)

Albert Coppé of Belgium, Second Vice-President (interim president from 8 March 1967

- Transport (Chairman)
- Information (Chairman)
- Coordination of energy policies (Member)
- Rules of competition (inc. transport) (Member)

Paul Finet of Belgium (coopted on 10 January 1964, died on 18 May 1965)

- Social problems (Chairman)
- Finance and investment (Member)
- Economic policy and industrial development (Member)

Jean Fohrman of Luxembourg, succeeding Finet on 30 June 1965

- Social problems (Chairman)
- Finance and investment (Member)
- Economic policy and industrial development (Member)

Fritz Hellwig of Germany (coopted on 10 January 1964)

- Coal and steel markets (Chairman)
- Coordination of energy policies (Member)

Karl-Maria Hettlage of Germany (from 14 December 1962, succeeding Potthof)

- Finance and investment (Chairman)
- Social problems (Member)

Pierre-Olivier Lapie of France

- Coordination of energy policies (Chairman)
- Transport (Member)
- Rules of competition (inc. transport) (Member)

Roger Reynaud of France (resigned September 1963, reappointed 10 January 1964)

- Economic policy and industrial development (Chairman)
- External relations (Member)
- Coal and steel markets (Member)

Albert Wehrer of Luxembourg

- External relations (Chairman)
- Finance and investment (Member)
- Information (Member)
