= Monnet Authority =

The Monnet Authority was the first High Authority of the European Coal and Steel Community (ECSC), between 1952 and 1955. Its president was Jean Monnet of France.

Monnet resigned on Europe day 1955 following the failure of the European Defence Community and was succeeded by the Mayer Authority. There were four more High Authorities before the institutions of the ECSC were merged with those of the European Atomic Energy Community and the European Economic Community in 1967 to become the European Communities.

== Membership ==
The High Authority was based temporarily in Luxembourg City and consisted of nine members; one each for the Benelux states, two for the larger states of France, Germany and Italy. Nevertheless, the Monnet Authority had two members from Belgium and one from Italy. The members were supposed to represent the general interest of the Community and were assisted by a consultative committee. Each member was involved in a number of areas, working with other members, and led one or two of those areas.

In addition to Jean Monnet of France, as president, the authority comprised:

- Franz Etzel of Germany, First Vice-President
  - Markets, agreements, transport (President)
  - Social problems
  - External relations
  - Press and information
  - 'Messina' working group
- Albert Coppé of Belgium, Second Vice-President
  - Long term policy (President)
  - Markets, agreements, transport
  - Press and information
  - 'Messina' working group
- Paul Finet of Belgium
  - Problems (President)
  - Administrative questions (President)
- Dirk Spierenburg of Netherlands
  - External relations (President)
  - Markets, agreements, transport
  - 'Messina' working group
- Léon Daum of France
  - Finance, investment, production (President)
  - Instructions group (President)
  - Long-term policy
  - Markets, agreements, transport
  - Press and information
- Enzo Giacchero of Italy
  - Press and information (President)
  - Long-term policy
  - Finance, investment, production
  - Administrative questions
  - Instructions group
- Albert Wehrer of Luxembourg
  - Finance, investment, production
  - Social Problems
  - External relations
  - Administrative questions
  - Instructions group
- Heinz Potthof of Germany
  - Long-term policy
  - Finance, investment, production
  - Administrative questions
  - Instructions group

== See also ==
- History of the European Union
- History of the European Commission
