= Finet =

Finet may refer to:

== People ==
- Achille Eugène Finet (1863–1913), French botanist
- John Finet (1571–1641), English Master of Ceremonies
- Louis Finet (born 1894), Belgian Olympic vaulter
- Patrice Pellat-Finet (born 1952), French Olympic alpine skier
- Paul Finet (1897–1965), Belgian politician
  - Finet Authority (1958–1959), European Coal and Steel Community

== Other ==
- FINET, a secure private network used by Malaysia's Ringgit Operations Monitoring System
