= Mayer Authority =

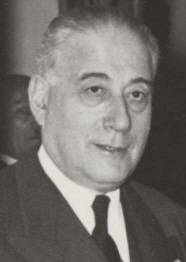
President René Mayer

The Mayer Authority was the second High Authority of the European Coal and Steel Community (ECSC), between 1955 and 1958. Its president was René Mayer of France.

There were three more High Authorities before the institutions of the ECSC were merged with those of the European Atomic Energy Community and the European Economic Community in 1967 to become the European Communities.

== Membership ==
There was a great deal of continuity with the Monnet Authority, in addition to René Mayer of France, as president, the Authority comprised;

Franz Etzel of Germany, First Vice-President (until he resigned on 28 October 1957

- External relations

Albert Coppé of Belgium, Second Vice-President

- General objectives and long term policy (Chairman)
- Markets, agreements, transport (Chairman)
- Press and information

Paul Finet of Belgium

- Social Problems

Dirk Spierenburg of Netherlands

- External relations (Chairman)
- Markets, agreements, transport

Léon Daum of France

- Finance, investment, production (Chairman)
- Instructions group (Chairman)
- General objectives and long term policy
- Markets, agreements, transport
- Press and information

Enzo Giacchero of Italy

- Press and information (President)
- General objectives and long term policy
- Industrial problems, finance
- Social problems

Albert Wehrer of Luxembourg

- Industrial problems, finance
- Social Problems
- External relations
- Instructions group
