= Finet Authority =

The Finet Authority was the third High Authority of the European Coal and Steel Community (ECSC), between 1958 and 1959. Its president was Paul Finet of Belgium.

There were two more High Authorities before the institutions of the ECSC were merged with those of the European Atomic Energy Community and the European Economic Community in 1967 to become the European Communities.

== Membership ==
In addition to Paul Finet of Belgium, as president, the Authority comprised;

Dirk Spierenburg of Netherlands, First Vice-President

- Steel, transport and concentrations (Chairman)
- External relations (Member)
- Finance, budget, administration (Member)
- Coal, contracts (Member)

Albert Coppé of Belgium, Second Vice-President

- General objectives and long term policy (Chairman)
- Investment and production (Member)
- Information, relations with Consultative Committee (Member)
- Coal, contracts (Member)

Franz Blücher of Germany (until he died on 26 March 1959)

- Coal, contracts (Member)
- General objectives and long term policy (Member)
- External relations (Member)
- Information, relations with the Consultative Committee (Member)

Léon Daum of France

- Investment and production (Chairman)
- External relations (Member)
- Coal, contracts (Member)
- Steel, transport, concentrations (Member)

Enzo Giacchero of Italy

- Social problems (Chairman)
- General objectives and long term policy (Member)
- Investment and production (Member)
- Steel, transport, concentrations (Member)

Heinz Potthof of Germany

- Finance, budget, administration (Chairman)
- Investment and production (Member)
- Social problems (Member)
- Steel, transport, concentrations (Member)

Roger Reynaud of France

- General objectives and long term policy (Member)
- Finance, budget, administration (Member)
- Social problems (Member)
- Coal, contracts (Alternate Member)

Albert Wehrer of Luxembourg

- External relations (Chairman)
- Finance, budget, administration (Member)
- Social Problems (Member)
- Information, relations with the Consultative Committee (Member)
- Steel, transport, concentrations (Member)
