= Rey Commission =

CEE commission

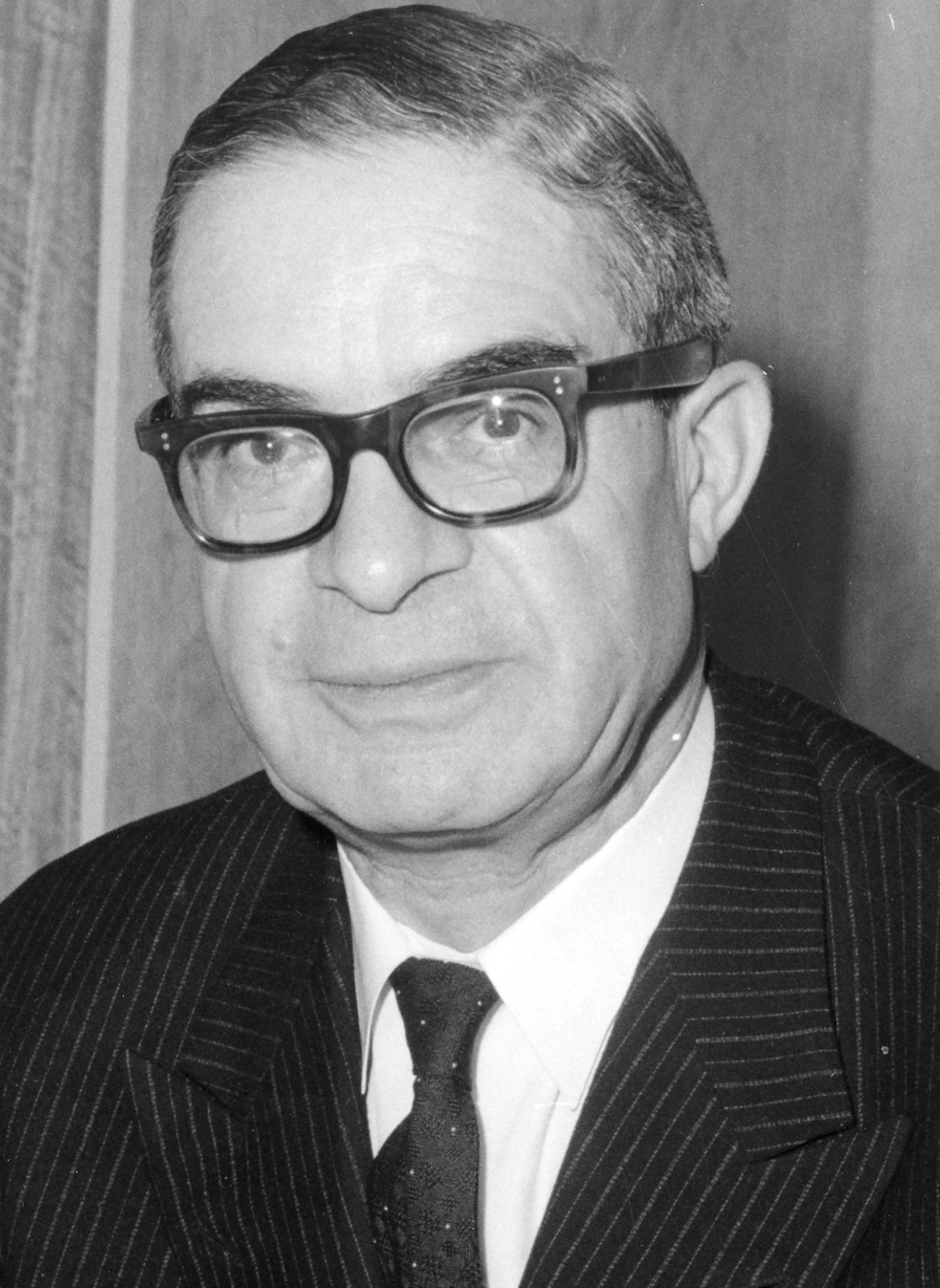
President Rey Term: 1967-1970 Party: LDR

The Rey Commission is the European Commission that held office from 2 July 1967 to 30 June 1970. Its president was Jean Rey.

== Work ==
The Rey Commission

It was the first commission of the merged European Communities. It was the successor to the Hallstein Commission and was succeeded by the Malfatti Commission. The commission worked to reinforce the Communities' institutions and increase the powers of the European Parliament. It also campaigned for an elected parliament, which was achieved later in 1979. It oversaw the competition of the customs union in 1968.

Rey played an important role the Summit of The Hague in 1969, where the European leaders decided to relaunch European integration with two new initiatives: on the one hand, Economic and Monetary Union of the European Union (EMU), and on the other hand, European Political Cooperation (EPC), which foreshadow the euro and the Common Foreign and Security Policy of the European Union today.

Finally, in 1970, the last year of this mandate, Rey managed to win the European governments' support for his proposal to give the Community "own resources". This meant that the EEC no longer depended exclusively on contributions by the member states, but could complete these with revenues from customs duties, levies on agricultural products from outside the EEC, in addition to a share of the VAT revenue.

== Membership ==
The commission was composed of 14 members, 3 from Italy, West Germany, and France, 2 from Belgium and the Netherlands and 1 from Luxembourg.

Portfolio(s)	Commissioner	Member state	Party	Notes
President; Secretariat General, Legal Service and Spokesman’s Service	Jean Rey	Belgium	PRL
Vice-president; Agriculture	Sicco Mansholt	Netherlands	PvdA
Vice-president; Social Affairs, Personnel and Administration	Lionello Levi Sandri	Italy	PSI
Vice-president; Research and Technology, Distribution of Information and Joint Research Center.	Fritz Hellwig	West Germany	CDU
Vice-president; Economic and Finance, Statistical Office	Raymond Barre	France	none
Budgets, Credit and Investment, Press and Information	Albert Coppé	Belgium	CVP
Internal Market and Regional Policy	Hans von der Groeben	West Germany	none
Competition	Maan Sassen	Netherlands	KVP
Development Assistance	Henri Rochereau	France	none
Industrial Affairs	Guido Colonna di Paliano	Italy	none	Resigned 8 May 1970, not replaced.
Foreign Trade, Enlargement and Assistance to developing countries	Jean-François Deniau	France	UDF
Transport	Victor Bodson	Luxembourg	LSAP
Vice-president; Energy	Wilhelm Haferkamp	West Germany	SPD
Foreign relations	Edoardo Martino	Italy	CD

=== Summary by political leanings ===
The colour of the row indicates the approximate political leaning of the office holder using the following scheme:

Affiliation	No. of Commissioners
Right leaning / Conservative	8
Liberal	2
Left leaning / Socialist	4
