= Coppé Authority =

The Coppé Authority was an interim High Authority of the European Coal and Steel Community (ECSC), between 1 March and 5 July 1967. Its president was Albert Coppé of Belgium. The Authority was subsequently combined by the Merger Treaty (1967) with the Commissions of the European Atomic Energy Community and the European Economic Community to become the Commission of the European Communities.
