= Fritz Hellwig =

German politician (1912–2017)

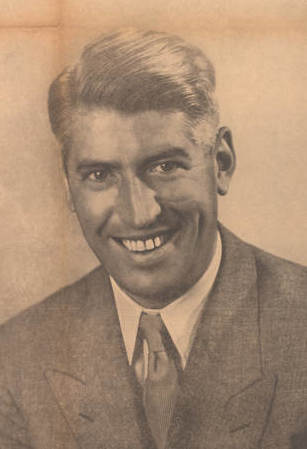
- Hellwig in 1953

European Commissioner for Research, Technology and Information Distribution
- In office 2 July 1967 – 30 June 1970
- President: Jean Rey
- Preceded by: Position established
- Succeeded by: Ralf Dahrendorf (Research, Science and Education); Altiero Spinelli (Industry and Technology)

Personal details
- Born: 3 August 1912 Saarbrücken, Prussia (now Germany)
- Died: 22 July 2017 (aged 104)
- Party: Christian Democratic Union
- Education: University of Marburg; University of Vienna; University of Berlin

Fritz Hellwig (3 August 1912 – 22 July 2017) was a German CDU politician and European Commissioner. He was born in Saarbrücken and turned 100 in August 2012. He died on 22 July 2017 at the age of 104, being the last surviving member of the Second Bundestag.

== Early life ==
Hellwig was born in the area known today as the Saarland province, known at that time as the Rhine Province of Prussia. After finishing school in 1930 in Saarbrücken, he studied philosophy, national economy, political sciences and history in Marburg, Vienna and Humboldt University of Berlin. He received a doctorate in 1933 in Berlin with a study on The Fight for the Saar 1860 – 1870, and in 1936 concluded a Habilitation with a work on the Saarland Industrialist Carl Ferdinand von Stumm-Halberg. From 1933 to 1939, he worked in the Saarbrücken Chamber of Commerce and Industry. From 1937 he was also a lecturer at the Saarbrücken teacher training university. Hellwig was a member of the NSDAP and the SA, and maybe also a member of the SS—his membership card of the writer's chapter of the Reich Chamber of Culture is ambiguous. In 1939/1940 Hellwig was managing director of the iron production organization in Düsseldorf and until 1943 of the iron and steel producing industry in the southwest district. He was called up to serve in the armed forces in 1943 and served until 1947.

After his dismissal from the army, Hellwig became an economic adviser in Duesseldorf and Duisburg. From 1951 to 1959, he was acting director of the German industrial institute in Cologne and also chairman of the "German Saarbundes". His analysis had a crucial influence on the "Saarpolitik" of Chancellor Konrad Adenauer.

== Party politics ==
At first, Hellwig had belonged to the Centre Party but in 1947 he joined the CDU and immediately became a member of the political-economic committee for the Rhineland. Later he was selected for the federal committee for economic policy and the federal promotion of the CDU. Hellwig was among the authors of the 1949 CDU publication Düsseldorfer Leitsätze (the Düsseldorf guiding principles).

== Public representative ==
Hellwig represented the Cologne II constituency in the Bundestag from 1953 to November 1959. From 21 September 1956 he was chairman of the Bundestag committee on economic policy. From 1953 to 1956 Hellwig was also a deputy delegate for the Council of Europe. In addition Hellwig was a member of the early European Parliament from 25 February 1959 to 14 September 1959.

== Public office ==
Hellwig left the Bundestag to become a member of the High Authority of the European Coal and Steel Community. When this was merged in 1967 with the Commission of European Economic Community he became a vice-president of the new Rey Commission and European Commissioner for Science & Research.

== Publications ==
- The fight for the Saar 1860 – 1870. Contributions to the Rhine politics Napoléons third , Berlin 1933.
- Carl baron von Stumm-Halberg , Habilitation, Heidelberg/Saarbrücken, 1936.
- Lorraine steel instead of Ruhr steel? , Duesseldorf 1947.
- The economic entwinements of the Saar , Duesseldorf 1947.
- Konrad Adenauer. To 125. Birthday , in: Historical-political reports, number 8, 2001, pages 1 – 10.
- European integration from historical experience , a time witness discussion with Michael Gehler, Bonn 2004 ISSN 1435-3288 ISBN 3-936183-29-5 (pdf; 0.6 MT).

Political offices
New office	German European Commissioner; 1967–1970; Served alongside: Wilhelm Haferkamp, Hans von der Groeben	Succeeded by Wilhelm Haferkamp
New office	German European Commissioner; 1967–1970; Served alongside: Wilhelm Haferkamp, Hans von der Groeben	Succeeded by Ralf Dahrendorf as European Commissioner for Research, Science and Education
New office	European Commissioner for Research, Technology and Information Distribution; 1967–1970	Succeeded by Ralf Dahrendorf as European Commissioner for Research, Science and Education
New office	European Commissioner for Research, Technology and Information Distribution; 1967–1970	Succeeded by Altiero Spinelli as European Commissioner for Industry and Technology
