= European Commissioner for Social Rights and Skills, Quality Jobs and Preparedness =

Member of the EU Commission

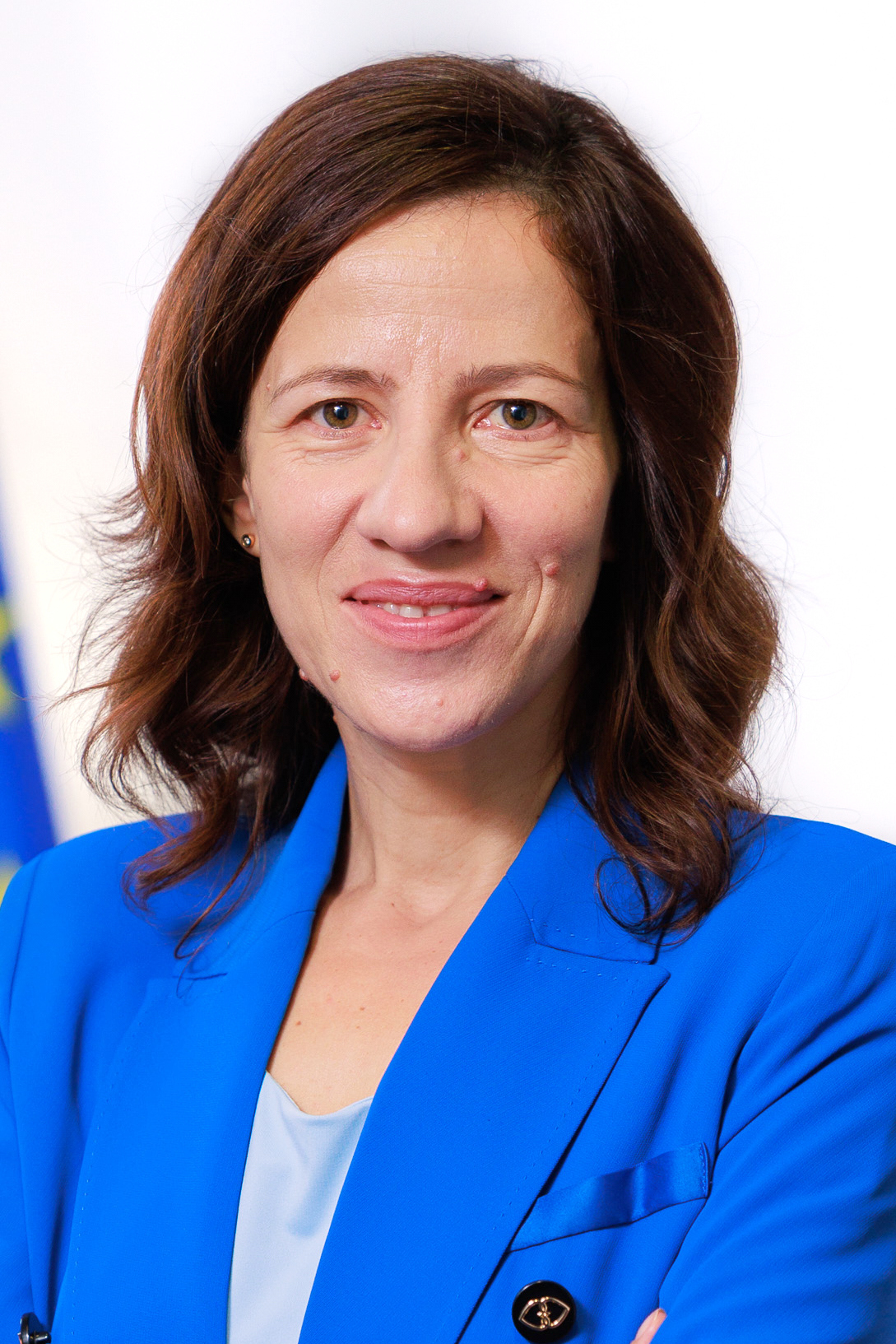
- Incumbent; Roxana Mînzatu since 1 December 2024
- Appointer: President of the European Commission
- Term length: 5 years
- Inaugural holder: Lionello Levi Sandri
- Formation: 1967

The Commissioner for Social Rights and Skills, Quality Jobs and Preparedness is a member of the European Commission. The position was previously titled as the Commissioner for Employment, Social Affairs, Skills and Labour Mobility until 2019. The current holder is Roxana Mînzatu.

The portfolio is responsible for matters relating to employment, social affairs, skills, and labour mobility. It also includes the coordination of the European Social Fund (ESF), the European Globalisation Adjustment Fund (EGF) and the management of the EU Programme for Employment and Social Innovation (EaSI), which brings together three EU programmes since 2014, namely EURES, PROGRESS, and Progress Microfinance.

== List of commissioners ==
#	Name	Country	Period	Commission
1	Lionello Levi Sandri	Italy	1967–1970	Rey Commission
2	Albert Coppé	Belgium	1970–1973	Malfatti Commission, Mansholt Commission
3	Patrick Hillery	Ireland	1973–1977	Ortoli Commission
4	Henk Vredeling	Netherlands	1977–1981	Jenkins Commission
5	Ivor Richard	United Kingdom	1981–1985	Thorn Commission
6	Peter Sutherland	Ireland	1985–1989	Delors Commission I
7	Vasso Papandreou	Greece	1989–1992	Delors Commission II
8	Pádraig Flynn	Ireland	1993–1999	Delors Commission III, Santer Commission
9	Anna Diamantopoulou	Greece	1999–2004	Prodi Commission
10	Vladimír Špidla	Czech Republic	2004–2010	Barroso Commission I
11	László Andor	Hungary	2010–2014	Barroso Commission II
12	Marianne Thyssen	Belgium	2014–2019	Juncker Commission
13	Nicolas Schmit	Luxembourg	2019–2024	von der Leyen Commission
14	Roxana Mînzatu	Romania	2024–present	von der Leyen Commission II

== See also ==
- Directorate-General for Employment, Social Affairs and Equal Opportunities
- European Social Fund
- European Year of Equal Opportunities for All
