= Malfatti Commission =

The Malfatti Commission is the European Commission that held office from 1 July 1970 to 21 March 1972. Its president was Franco Maria Malfatti.

== Work ==
It was the successor to the Rey Commission and was succeeded by the Mansholt Commission. The Malfatti Commission began as the integration process was relaunched: the EC adopting a financial framework and competing the single market. There was also the beginnings of political cooperation, monetary cooperation and of enlargement as talks opened with Denmark, Ireland, Norway and the United Kingdom.

== Membership ==
The Malfatti Commission

Portfolio(s)	Commissioner	Member state	Party affiliation
President	Franco Maria Malfatti	Italy	DC
Vice President; Agriculture	Sicco Mansholt	Netherlands	Labour
Vice President; Internal Market & Energy	Wilhelm Haferkamp	West Germany	SPD
Economic & Financial Affairs	Raymond Barre	France	UDF
Competition & Regional Policy	Albert Borschette	Luxembourg	
Social Affairs, Transport & Budget	Albert Coppé	Belgium	CVP
External Relations & Trade	Ralf Dahrendorf	West Germany	FDP
External Relations & Development Aid	Jean-François Deniau	France	UDF
Industrial Affairs & Trade	Altiero Spinelli	Italy	Italian Communist Party

=== Summary by political leanings ===
The colour of the row indicates the approximate political leaning of the office holder using the following scheme:

Affiliation	No. of Commissioners
Right leaning / Conservative	2
Liberal	3
Left leaning / Socialist	2
Eurocommunist	1
Independent	1

== See also ==
- Delors Commission
- Santer Commission
- Prodi Commission
- Barroso Commission
