= Rinaldo Del Bo =

Italian politician (1916–1991)

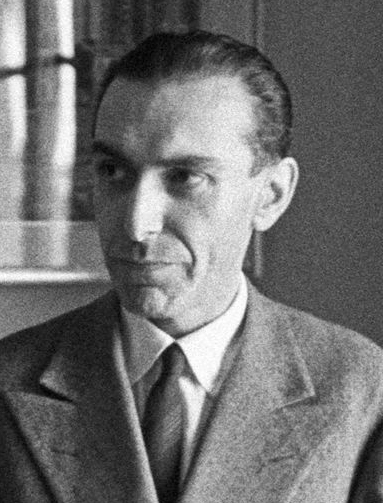

President of the ECSC High Authority
- In office 22 October 1963 – 8 March 1967
- Preceded by: Piero Malvestiti
- Succeeded by: Albert Coppé

Minister of Foreign Trade
- In office 16 February 1959 – 26 March 1960
- Prime Minister: Antonio Segni
- Preceded by: Emilio Colombo
- Succeeded by: Mario Martinelli

Minister for Parliamentary Relations
- In office 19 May 1957 – 14 February 1959
- Prime Minister: Adone Zoli; Amintore Fanfani
- Preceded by: Raffaele De Caro
- Succeeded by: Giuseppe Bettiol

Member of the Chamber of Deputies
- In office 8 May 1948 – 21 October 1963
- Constituency: Milan

Personal details
- Born: 19 November 1916 Milan, Lombardy, Italy
- Died: 16 January 1991 (aged 74) Milan, Lombardy, Italy
- Party: DC
- Education: Catholic University of the Sacred Heart; University of Pavia
- Profession: Politician

Rinaldo "Dino" Del Bo (19 November 1916 – 16 January 1991) was an Italian politician who served in the High Authority of the European Coal and Steel Community, serving as President of the body between 9 October 1963 and 1967 as the Del Bo Authority.

== Biography ==
Del Bo was born on 19 November 1916 in Milan, Italy. He graduated with a degree in law from the Università Cattolica del Sacro Cuore and also with a degree in political science from the University of Pavia, leading up to World War II.

He was a prominent exponent of the fascist university organizations of Milan, he collaborated in a branch position in magazines such as Gerarchia and Fascist Doctrine. At first close to the fascist current of mysticism, after 8 September 1943 (date of the Armistice of Cassibile), together with Teresio Olivelli, Carlo Bianchi, David Maria Turoldo, Mario Apollonio and Giovanni Barbareschi, took part in the meetings that led to the foundation of the newspaper Il Ribelle. The newspaper of the Brigate Fiamme Verdi was published in 26 issues. One of the printers, Franco Rovida, and Teresio Olivelli himself died in a concentration camp.

After World War II he was MP for four terms among the Christian Democracy ranks and held various governmental offices, including that of Minister of Foreign Trade in the second Segni government. He organized President Gronchi's trip to the USSR. He was then the fifth president of the ECSC High Authority in the four-year period 1963–1967.
