= European Commissioner for Research, Science and Innovation =

The Commissioner for Research, Science and Innovation was a portfolio within the European Commission. In 2019, the portfolio was merged with the Commissioner for Education, Youth, Sport and Culture to form the role of European Commissioner for Innovation, Research, Culture, Education and Youth, held by Mariya Gabriel.

The portfolio was responsible primarily for research and improving the conditions in the Union for researchers. The post is known familiarly as Science and Research; however it involves other fields such as technology, development etc.

== List of commissioners ==
#	Name	Country	Period	Commission
1	Fritz Hellwig	West Germany	1967–1970	Rey Commission
2	Ralf Dahrendorf	West Germany	1973–1977	Ortoli Commission
3	Guido Brunner	West Germany	1977–1981	Jenkins Commission
4	Filippo Maria Pandolfi	Italy	1989–1993	Delors Commission
5	Antonio Ruberti	Italy	1993–1995	Delors Commission III
6	Édith Cresson	France	1995–1999	Santer Commission
7	Philippe Busquin	Belgium	1999–2004	Prodi Commission
8	Louis Michel	Belgium	2004	Prodi Commission
9	Janez Potočnik	Slovenia	2004–2010	Barroso Commission I
10	Máire Geoghegan-Quinn	Ireland	2010–2014	Barroso Commission II
11	Carlos Moedas	Portugal	2014–2019	Juncker Commission

== See also ==
- Directorate-General for Research
- Joint Research Centre
- European Research Area
- Framework Programmes
- Lisbon Strategy
- European Atomic Energy Community
- Eurodoc
- European Research Advisory Board
- European Research Council
- European Charter for Researchers
- European Council of Applied Sciences and Engineering
- European Institute of Technology
