= Wilhelm Haferkamp =

German politician and European bureaucrat

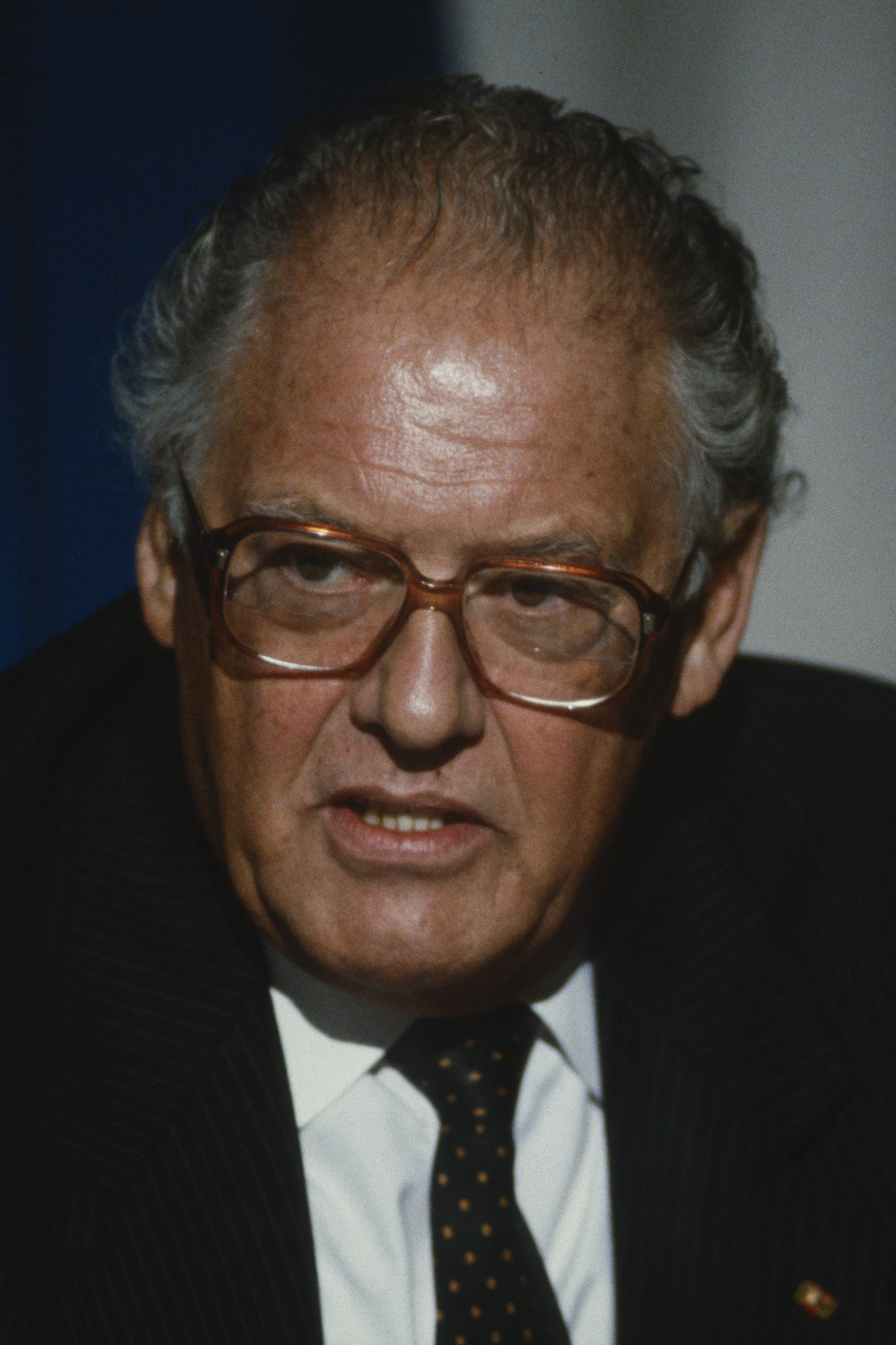
- Haferkamp in 1986

Vice-President of the European Commission
- In office 2 July 1967 – 5 January 1985
- President: Jean Rey; Franco Maria Malfatti; Sicco Mansholt; François-Xavier Ortoli; Roy Jenkins; Gaston Thorn

European Commissioner^{[Portfolios]}
- In office 2 July 1967 – 5 January 1985

Personal details
- Born: 1 July 1923
- Died: 17 January 1995 (aged 71) Brussels, Belgium
- Party: Social Democratic Party of Germany

Wilhelm Haferkamp (German pronunciation: [ˈvɪlhɛlm ˈhaːfɐˌkamp]; 1 July 1923 – 17 January 1995) was a long-time member of the European Commission. Born in Germany, he was a social democratic politician. He was appointed to the commission by the West German government in 1967 and served in a number of posts including Vice President until 1985. He died in Brussels.

In the Rey Commission from 1967 he served as Commissioner for Energy. His portfolio then expanded to include the Internal Market in 1970 under the Malfatti Commission and Mansholt Commission until 1973 when he joined the Ortoli Commission as Commissioner for Economic, Finance, Credit and Investments. His last post was Commissioner for External Relations, which he served as until 1985 under the Jenkins and Thorn Commissions. As of 2026, he is the longest serving EU Commissioner ever.

== Notes ==
^{Commissioner for Energy from 2 July 1967 to 30 June 1970; Commissioner for Internal Market and Energy from 1 July 1970 to 5 January 1973; Commissioner for Economics, Finance, Credit and Investment from 6 January 1973 to 5 January 1977; Commissioner for External Relations from 6 January 1977 to 5 January 1985; Commissioner for Nuclear Affairs from 6 January 1981 to 5 January 1985}

Political offices
Preceded by Hans von der Groeben; Fritz Hellwig	German European Commissioner; 1967–1985	Succeeded by ?
Preceded by Hans von der Groeben as European Commissioner for Internal Market and Regional Policy	European Commissioner for Internal Market and Energy; 1970–1973	Succeeded by Finn Olav Gundelach as European Commissioner for the Internal Market and the Customs Union
