= Piero Malvestiti =

Italian politician (1899–1964)

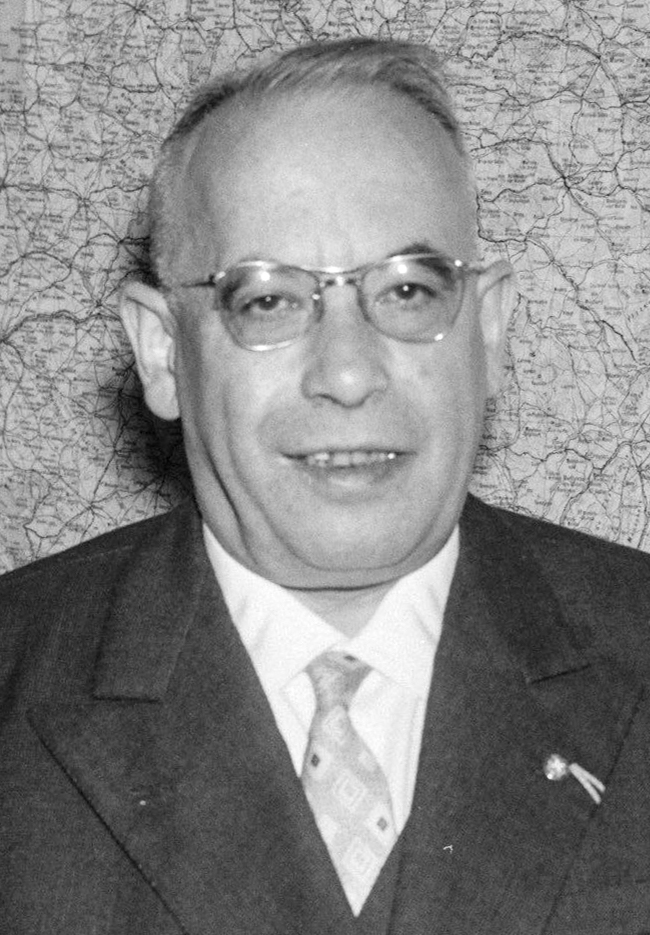
- Malvestiti in 1959

President of the High Authority of the European Coal and Steel Community
- In office 15 September 1959 – 22 October 1963
- Preceded by: Paul Finet
- Succeeded by: Rinaldo Del Bo

European Commissioner for Internal Market
- In office 7 January 1958 – 15 September 1959
- President: Walter Hallstein
- Preceded by: Position established
- Succeeded by: Giuseppe Caron

Personal details
- Born: 26 June 1899; Apiro, Italy
- Died: 5 November 1964 (aged 65); Milan, Italy
- Political party: Christian Democracy

Piero Malvestiti (26 June 1899 – 5 November 1964) was an Italian politician who was a minister in successive governments in the 1940s and 1950s, a European Commissioner and President of the High Authority of the European Coal and Steel Community.

He was one of the founders of the Christian Democratic party in 1942 when he merged his own Movimento Guelfo d'Azione with the Italian Peoples Party.

From 25 October 1947, he served as under-secretary to the Minister for Finance in the fourth government of Alcide De Gasperi which served from 1947 to 1948. In the succeeding fifth and sixth De Gasperi governments he served as one of the undersecretaries to the Treasury Minister from 1948 to 1951.

In the succeeding De Gasperi WAYS government from 1951 to 1953 he served as Minister for Transport. In the succeeding Giuseppe Pella government from 1953 to 1954, he served as Minister for Industry and Commerce.

In January 1958 he became one of Italy's first European Commissioners as a vice-president of the Hallstein Commission with responsibility for the Internal Market. However, in September 1959 he resigned from the commission as he was elected President of the European Coal and Steel Community, a position he held until November 1963. He was replaced on the commission by Giuseppe Caron.

Malvestiti died in 1964. There is a street in Milan named Via Pierro Malvestiti.

Political offices
New office	Italian European Commissioner; 1958–1959; Served alongside: Giuseppe Petrilli	Succeeded by Giuseppe Caron
New office	European Commissioner for Internal Market; 1958–1959	Succeeded by Giuseppe Caron
Preceded by Paul Finet	President of the High Authority of the European Coal and Steel Community; 1959–1963	Succeeded by Rinaldo Del Bo
