= Hans Linthorst Homan =

Dutch politician and diplomat

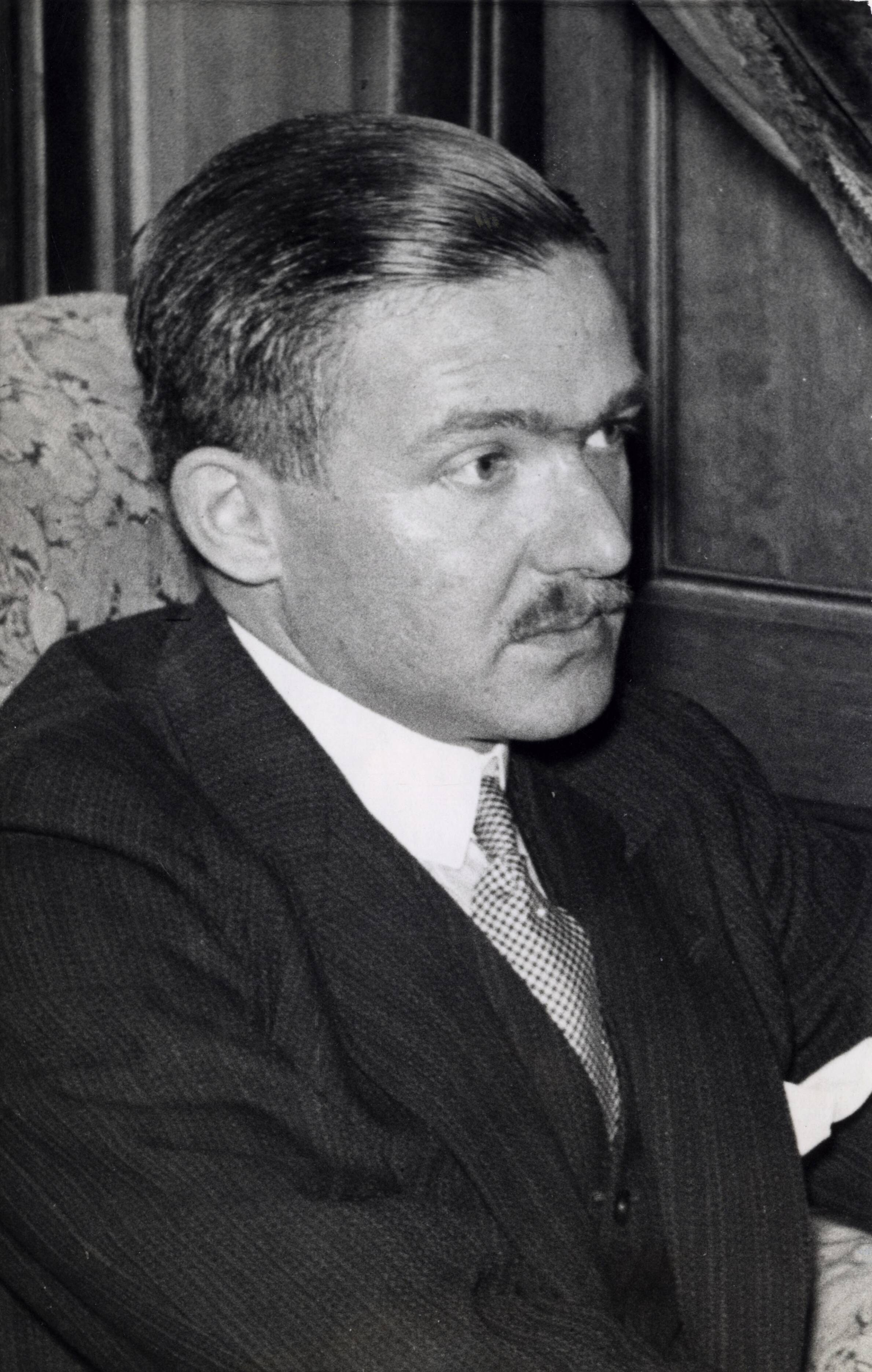
Hans Linthorst Homan

Johannes (Hans) Linthorst Homan (17 February 1903 – 6 November 1986) was a Dutch politician and diplomat.

He was born in Assen to the patrician Linthorst Homan family, the son of Jan Tijmens Linthorst Homan. He studied law in Leiden, and started practising in Assen in 1926. He joined the Liberal Freedom League and in 1937 was a candidate for parliament. He became the Queen's Commissioner for Groningen.

During the German occupation, he sought to resign his position in September 1940, but had to remain in post until August 1941. He had been a co-founder of the Dutch Union in 1940, before it was closed in favour of the Nationaal-Socialistische Beweging in 1941. Later in the war he was arrested and then released. Following the war, he was prevented from continuing in his previous post, but took up other public positions including being chairman of the Dutch Olympic Committee.

He became Director for integration in the External Economic Affairs Directorate General in June 1952. He contributed to the failed Beyen plan and then participated in the Messina conference, leading the Dutch delegation which ended up with his signature of the Treaty of Rome. He later became the first permanent representative to the EEC and ECSC. From 1968 to 1971 he was the European Communities representative in London.

He died in Rome in 1986.
