= Albert Coppé =

Belgian politician and economist

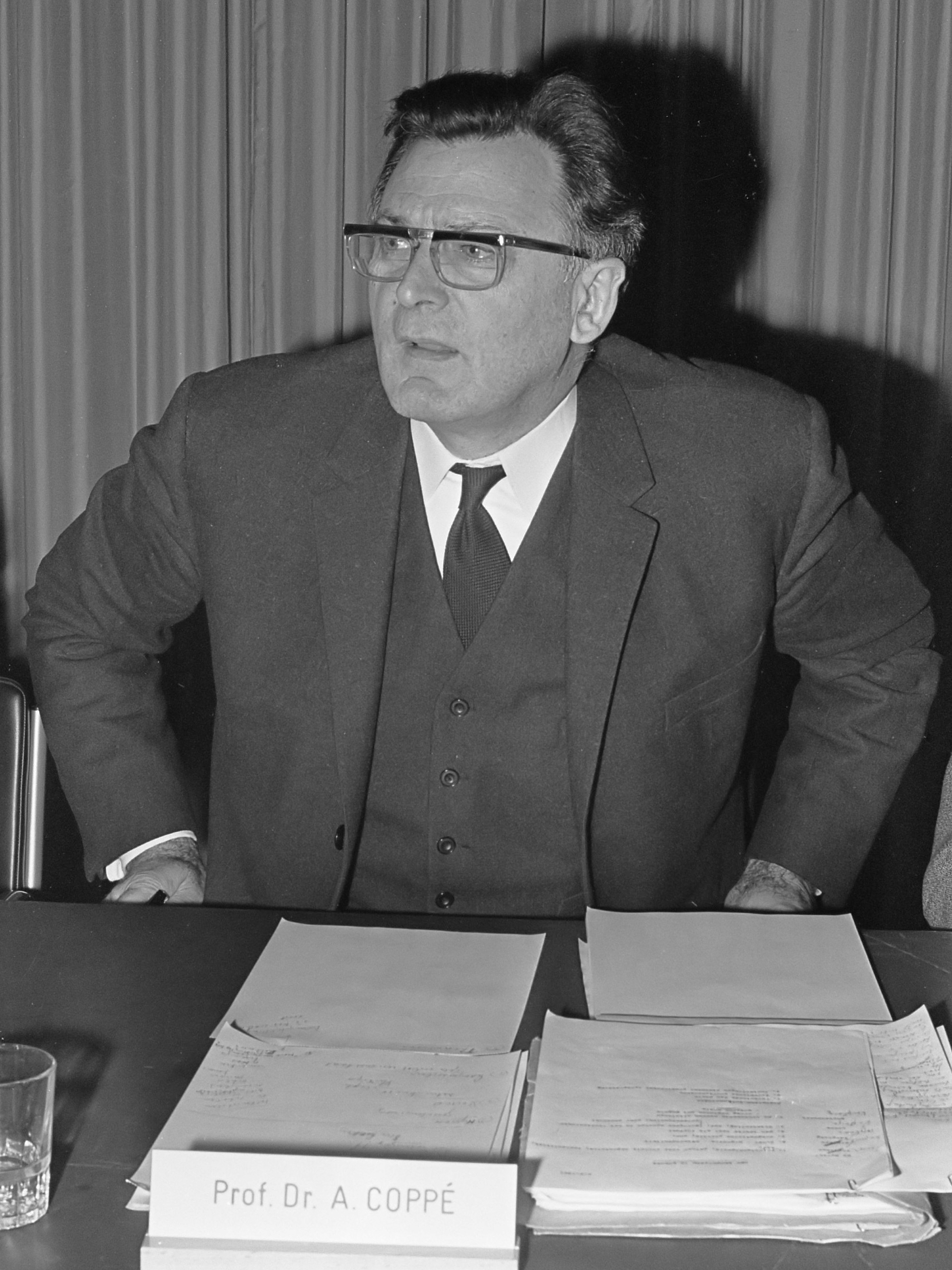
- Coppé in 1967

European Commissioner for Social Affairs, Transport and Budget
- In office 1 July 1970 – 6 January 1973
- President: Franco Maria Malfatti; Sicco Mansholt
- Preceded by: Lionello Levi Sandri (Social Affairs, Personnel and Administration); Victor Bodson (Transport); Himself (Budgets, Credit, Investment, Press and Information)
- Succeeded by: Patrick Hillery (Social Affairs); Carlo Scarascia-Mugnozza (Parliamentary Affairs, Environmental Policy and Transport)

European Commissioner for Budget, Credit, Investment, Press and Information
- In office 2 July 1967 – 1 July 1970
- President: Jean Rey
- Preceded by: Position established
- Succeeded by: Himself (Social Affairs, Transport and Budget); Wilhelm Haferkamp (Economics, Finance, Credit and Investments)

President of the High Authority of the European Coal and Steel Community Acting
- In office 1 March 1967 – 2 July 1967
- Preceded by: Rinaldo Del Bo
- Succeeded by: Position abolished

Personal details
- Born: 26 November 1911 Bruges, Belgium
- Died: 30 March 1999 (aged 87) Tervuren, Belgium
- Party: Christian Democratic and Flemish

Albert Coppé (26 November 1911 – 30 March 1999) was a Belgian and European politician and economist.

== Biography ==
Born in Bruges on 26 November 1911, Coppé was a founding member of the CVP party and served in the European Commission as Commissioner for Social Affairs, Transport & Budget under the Malfatti & Mansholt Commissions. He was the vice-president of an interim High Authority in the European Coal and Steel Community in 1952–1967.

Coppé died in Tervuren on 30 March 1999.

== See also ==
- High Authority of the European Coal and Steel Community

Political offices
Preceded by Rinaldo Del Bo	President of the High Authority of the European Coal and Steel Community; Acting; 1967	Succeeded by Position abolished
Preceded by Jean Rey	Belgian European Commissioner; 1967–1973; Served alongside: Jean Rey	Succeeded by Henri Simonet
New office	European Commissioner for Budget, Credit, Investment, Press and Information; 1967–1970	Succeeded by Himself as European Commissioner for Social Affairs, Transport and Budget
New office	European Commissioner for Budget, Credit, Investment, Press and Information; 1967–1970	Succeeded by Wilhelm Haferkamp as European Commissioner for Economics, Finance, Credit and Investments
Preceded by Lionello Levi Sandri as European Commissioner for Social Affairs, Personnel and Administration	European Commissioner for Social Affairs, Transport and Budget; 1970–1973	Succeeded by Patrick Hillery as European Commissioner for Social Affairs
Preceded by Victor Bodson as European Commissioner for Transport	European Commissioner for Social Affairs, Transport and Budget; 1970–1973	Succeeded by Carlo Scarascia-Mugnozza as European Commissioner for Parliamentary Affairs, Environmental Policy and Transport
Preceded by Himself as European Commissioner for Budgets, Credit, Investment, Press and Information	European Commissioner for Social Affairs, Transport and Budget; 1970–1973	
