= Paul Finet =

Belgian politician (1897–1965)

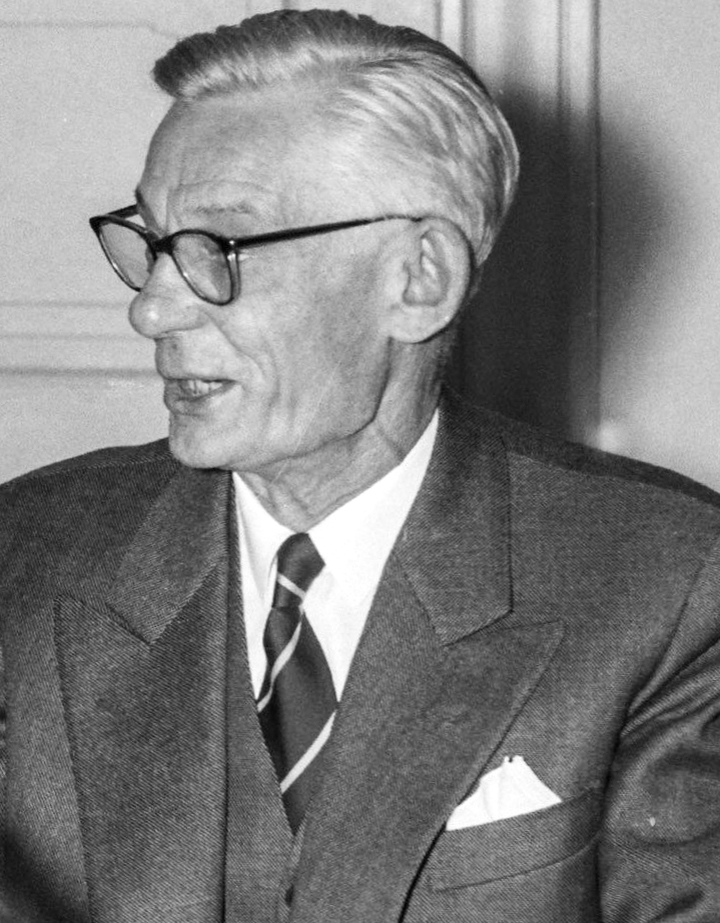

President of the European Coal and Steel Community
- In office 13 January 1958 – 15 September 1959
- Preceded by: René Mayer
- Succeeded by: Piero Malvestiti

Personal details
- Born: 4 November 1897 Montignies-sur-Sambre, Belgium
- Died: 18 May 1965 (aged 67) Luxembourg, Luxembourg

Paul Finet (4 November 1897 – 18 May 1965) was a Belgian politician and former General Secretary of FGTB. He served in the High Authority of the European Coal and Steel Community from 1952 on, chairing it in 1958. From 1958 to 1959, he then headed the Finet Authority.

Political offices
Preceded by René Mayer	President of the European Coal and Steel Community; 1958–1959	Succeeded by Piero Malvestiti
