= European Coal and Steel Community =

Regulator of coal and steel markets, 1952–67

(in other national languages)
Danish	Europæiske Kul- og Stålfællesskab
German	Europäische Gemeinschaft für Kohle und Stahl
Greek	Εὐρωπαϊκὴ Κοινότης Ἄνθρακος καὶ Χάλυβος
Spanish	Comunidad Europea del Carbón y del Acero
Finnish	Euroopan hiili- ja teräsyhteisö
French	Communauté européenne du charbon et de l'acier
Irish	Comhphobal Eorpach do Ghual agus Chruach
Italian	Comunità Europea del Carbone e dell'Acciaio
Dutch	Europese Gemeenschap voor Kolen en Staal
Portuguese	Comunidade Europeia do Carvão e do Aço
Swedish	Europeiska Kol- och Stålgemenskapen
- 1952–2002¹
- Flag

- Founding members of the ECSC: Belgium, France, Italy, Luxembourg, the Netherlands and West Germany
- Status: International organization
- Capital: Not applicable²
- Common languages: 11 (2002)³: Danish; Dutch; English; Finnish; French; German; Greek; Italian; Portuguese; Spanish; Swedish
- President of the High Authority (pre-Merger treaty)
  - 1952–1955: Jean Monnet
  - 1955–1958: René Mayer
  - 1958–1959: Paul Finet
  - 1959–1963: Piero Malvestiti
  - 1963–1967: Rinaldo Del Bo
- Interim President of the High Authority (supervising the Merger)
  - 1967: Albert Coppé
- President of the European Commission (in its capacity as the High Authority post-Merger treaty)
  - 1967–1970 (first): Jean Rey
  - 1999–2002 (last): Romano Prodi
- Historical era: Cold War
  - Signing (Treaty of Paris): 18 April 1951
  - In force: 23 July 1952
  - Merger: 1 July 1967
  - Treaty expired: 23 July 2002¹
Preceded by	Succeeded by
International Authority for the Ruhr	European Economic Community
- Today part of: European Union
- 1. The ECSC treaty expired in 2002, fifty years after it came into force, but its institutions were taken over in 1967 following the Merger Treaty.; 2. The political centres were Luxembourg and Strasbourg, later also Brussels.; 3. Initial founding languages, before the merger and subsequent enlargements, were Dutch, French, German and Italian.

The European Coal and Steel Community (ECSC) was a European organization created after World War II to integrate Europe's coal and steel industries into a single common market based on the principle of supranationalism which would be governed by the creation of a High Authority made up of appointed representatives from the member states who would not represent their national interest, but would take and make decisions in the general interests of the Community as a whole. It was formally established in 1951 by the Treaty of Paris, signed by Belgium, France, Italy, Luxembourg, the Netherlands, and West Germany and was generally seen as the first step in the process of European integration following the end of the Second World War in Europe. The organization is a spiritual predecessor to the contemporary European Union (EU) as its subsequent enlargement of both members and duties ultimately led to the creation of the EU.

The ECSC was first proposed via the Schuman Declaration by French foreign minister Robert Schuman on 9 May 1950 (commemorated in the EU as Europe Day), the day after the fifth anniversary of the end of World War II, to prevent another war between France and Germany. He declared "the solidarity in production" from pooling "coal and steel production" would make war between the two "not only unthinkable but materially impossible". The Treaty created a common market among member states that stipulated free movement of goods (without customs duties or taxes) and prohibited states from introducing unfair competitive or discriminatory practices.

Its terms were enforced by four institutions: a High Authority composed of independent appointees, a Common Assembly composed of national parliamentarians, a Special Council composed of national ministers, and a Court of Justice. These would ultimately form the blueprint for today's European Commission, European Parliament, the Council of the European Union, and the Court of Justice of the European Union, respectively.

The ECSC set an example for the pan-European organizations created by the Treaty of Rome in 1957: the European Economic Community and European Atomic Energy Community, with whom it shared its membership and some institutions. The 1967 Merger (Brussels) Treaty merged the ECSC's institutions into the European Economic Community, but the former retained its own independent legal personality until the Treaty of Paris expired in 2002, leaving its activities fully absorbed by the European Community under the frameworks of the Treaties of Amsterdam and Nice.

== History ==
As Prime Minister and Foreign Minister, Schuman was instrumental in turning French policy away from the Gaullist objective of permanent occupation or control of parts of German territory such as the Ruhr or the Saar. Despite stiff ultra-nationalist, Gaullist and communist opposition, the French Assembly voted a number of resolutions in favour of his new policy of integrating Germany in a community. The International Authority for the Ruhr changed in consequence.

=== Background: Schuman declaration ===
The Schuman Declaration had the stated aim of preventing further antagonism between France and Germany and among other European states by tackling the root cause of war through the establishment of common foundations for economic development. Schuman proposed the formation of the ECSC primarily with France and Germany in mind: "The coming together of the nations of Europe requires the elimination of the age-old opposition of France and Germany. Any action taken must in the first place concern these two countries." Portraying the coal and steel industries as integral to the production of munitions, Schuman proposed that uniting these two industries across France and Germany under an innovative supranational system (that also included a European anti-cartel agency) would "make war between France and Germany [...] not only unthinkable but materially impossible".

=== Negotiations ===
Following the Schuman Declaration in May 1950, negotiations on what became the Treaty of Paris (1951) began on 20 June 1950. The objective of the treaty was to create a single market in the coal and steel industries of the member states. Customs duties, subsidies, discriminatory and restrictive practices were all to be abolished. The single market was to be supervised by a High Authority, with powers to handle extreme shortages of supply or demand, to tax, and to prepare production forecasts as guidelines for investment.

A key issue in the negotiations for the treaty was the break-up of the excessive concentrations in the coal and steel industries of the Ruhr, where the Konzerne, or trusts, had underlain the military power of the former Reich. The Germans regarded the concentration of coal and steel as one of the bases of their economic efficiency, and a right. The steel barons were a formidable lobby because they embodied a national tradition.

The United States was not officially part of the treaty negotiations, but it was a major force behind the scenes. The US High Commissioner for Occupied Germany, John McCloy, was an advocate of decartelization and his chief advisor in Germany was a Harvard anti-trust lawyer, Robert Bowie. Bowie was asked to draft anti-trust articles, and texts of the two articles he prepared (on cartels and the abuse of monopoly power) became the basis of the treaty's competition policy regime. Also, Raymond Vernon in the State Department (of later fame for his studies on industrial policy at Harvard university) carefully reviewed successive drafts of the treaty. He stressed the importance of the freedom of the projected common market from restrictive practices.

The Americans insisted that the German coal sales monopoly, the Deutscher Kohlenverkauf (DKV), should lose its monopoly, and that the steel industries should no longer own the coalmines. It was agreed that the DKV would be broken up into four independent sales agencies. The steel firm Vereinigte Stahlwerke was to be divided into thirteen firms, and Krupp into two. Ten years after the Schuman negotiations, a US State Department official noted that while the articles as finally agreed were more qualified than American officials in touch with the negotiations would have wished, they were "almost revolutionary" in terms of the traditional European approach to these basic industries.

=== Political pressures and treaty ratification ===
In West Germany, Karl Arnold, the Minister President of North Rhine-Westphalia, the state that included the coal and steel producing the Ruhr, was initially spokesman for German foreign affairs. He gave a number of speeches and broadcasts on a supranational coal and steel community at the same time as Robert Schuman began to propose this Community in 1948 and 1949. The Social Democratic Party of Germany (German: Sozialdemokratische Partei Deutschlands, SPD), in spite of support from unions and other socialists in Europe, decided it would oppose the Schuman plan. Kurt Schumacher's personal distrust of France, capitalism, and Konrad Adenauer aside, he claimed that a focus on integrating with a "Little Europe of the Six" would override the SPD's prime objective of German reunification and thus empower ultra-nationalist and Communist movements in democratic countries. He also thought the ECSC would end any hopes of nationalising the steel industry and lock in a Europe of "cartels, clerics and conservatives". Younger members of the party like Carlo Schmid, were, however, in favour of the Community and pointed to the long socialist support for the supranational idea.

In France, Schuman had gained strong political and intellectual support from all sections of the nation and many non-communist parties. Notable amongst these were ministerial colleague Andre Philip, president of the Foreign Relations Committee Edouard Bonnefous, and former prime minister, Paul Reynaud. Projects for a coal and steel authority and other supranational communities were formulated in specialist subcommittees of the Council of Europe in the period before it became French government policy. Charles de Gaulle, who was then out of power, had been an early supporter of "linkages" between economies, on French terms, and had spoken in 1945 of a "European confederation" that would exploit the resources of the Ruhr. However, he opposed the ECSC as a faux (false) pooling ("le pool, ce faux semblant") because he considered it an unsatisfactory "piecemeal approach" to European unity and because he considered the French government "too weak" to dominate the ECSC as he thought proper. De Gaulle also felt that the ECSC had an insufficient supranational mandate because its Assembly was not ratified by a European referendum and he did not accept Raymond Aron's contention that the ECSC was intended as a movement away from United States domination. Consequently, de Gaulle and his followers in the RPF voted against ratification in the lower house of the French Parliament.

Despite these attacks and those from the extreme left, the ECSC found substantial public support. It gained strong majorities votes in all eleven chambers of the parliaments of the Six, as well as approval among associations and European public opinion. In 1950, many had thought another war was inevitable. The steel and coal interests, however, were quite vocal in their opposition. The Council of Europe, created by a proposal of Schuman's first government in May 1948, helped articulate European public opinion and gave the Community idea positive support.

The UK Prime Minister Clement Attlee opposed Britain joining the proposed European Coal and Steel Community, saying that he 'would not accept the [UK] economy being handed over to an authority that is utterly undemocratic and is responsible to nobody.'

=== Founding treaty ===
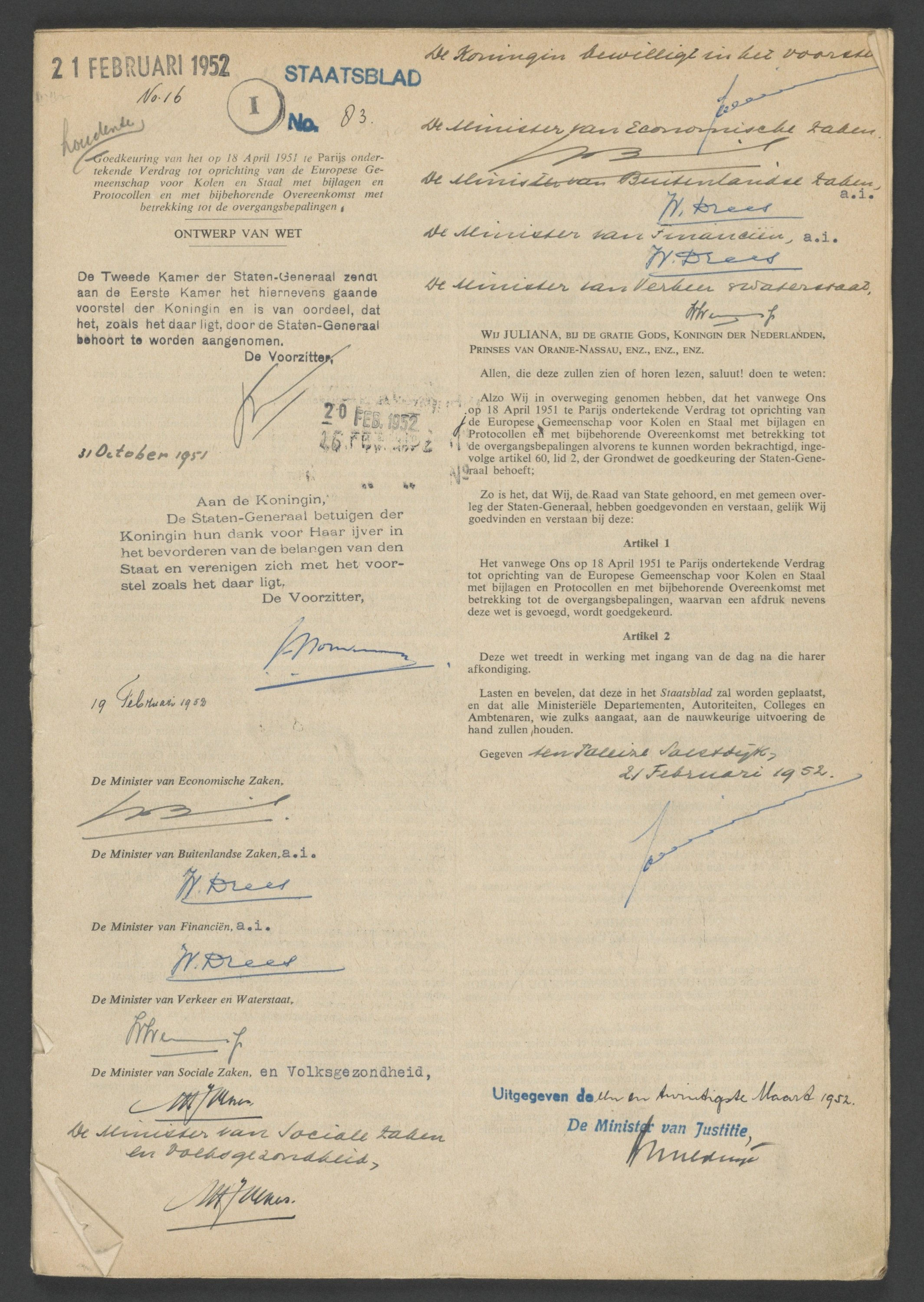
The Dutch act giving assent to the Treaty of Paris, signed by Queen Juliana and countersigned by the relevant ministers.

The 100-article Treaty of Paris, which established the ECSC, was signed on 18 April 1951 by "the inner six": France, West Germany, Italy, Belgium, the Netherlands and Luxembourg. The ECSC was based on supranational principles and was, through the establishment of a common market for coal and steel, intended to expand the economy, increase employment, and raise the standard of living within the Community. The market was also intended to progressively rationalise the distribution of production whilst ensuring stability and employment. The common market for coal was opened on 10 February 1953, and for steel on 1 May 1953. Upon taking effect, the ECSC replaced the International Authority for the Ruhr.

On 11 August 1952, the United States was the first non-ECSC member to recognise the Community and stated it would now deal with the ECSC on coal and steel matters, establishing its delegation in Brussels. Monnet responded by choosing Washington, D.C., as the site of the ECSC's first external presence. The headline of the delegation's first bulletin read "Towards a Federal Government of Europe".

Six years after the Treaty of Paris, the Treaty of Rome was signed by the six ECSC members, creating the European Economic Community (EEC) and the European Atomic Energy Community (EAEC or Euratom). These "Communities" were based, with some adjustments, on the ECSC. The Treaty of Rome was to be in force indefinitely, unlike the Treaty of Paris, which was to last for a renewable period of fifty years. These two new Communities worked on the creation of a customs union and nuclear power community respectively.

=== Merger Treaty ===
Despite being separate legal entities, the ECSC, EEC and Euratom initially shared the Common Assembly and the European Court of Justice, although the Councils and the High Authority/Commissions remained separate. To avoid duplication, the Merger Treaty merged these separate bodies of the ECSC and Euratom with those of the EEC. The EEC later became one of the three pillars of the present day European Union.

The Treaty of Paris was frequently amended as the EC and EU evolved and expanded.

=== Expiry ===
With the treaty due to expire in 2002, debate began at the beginning of the 1990s on what to do with it. It was eventually decided that it should be left to expire. The areas covered by the ECSC's treaty were transferred to the Treaty of Rome and the financial loose ends and the ECSC research fund were dealt with via a protocol of the Treaty of Nice. The treaty finally expired on 23 July 2002. That day, the ECSC flag was lowered for the final time outside the European Commission in Brussels and replaced with the EU flag.

== Institutions ==
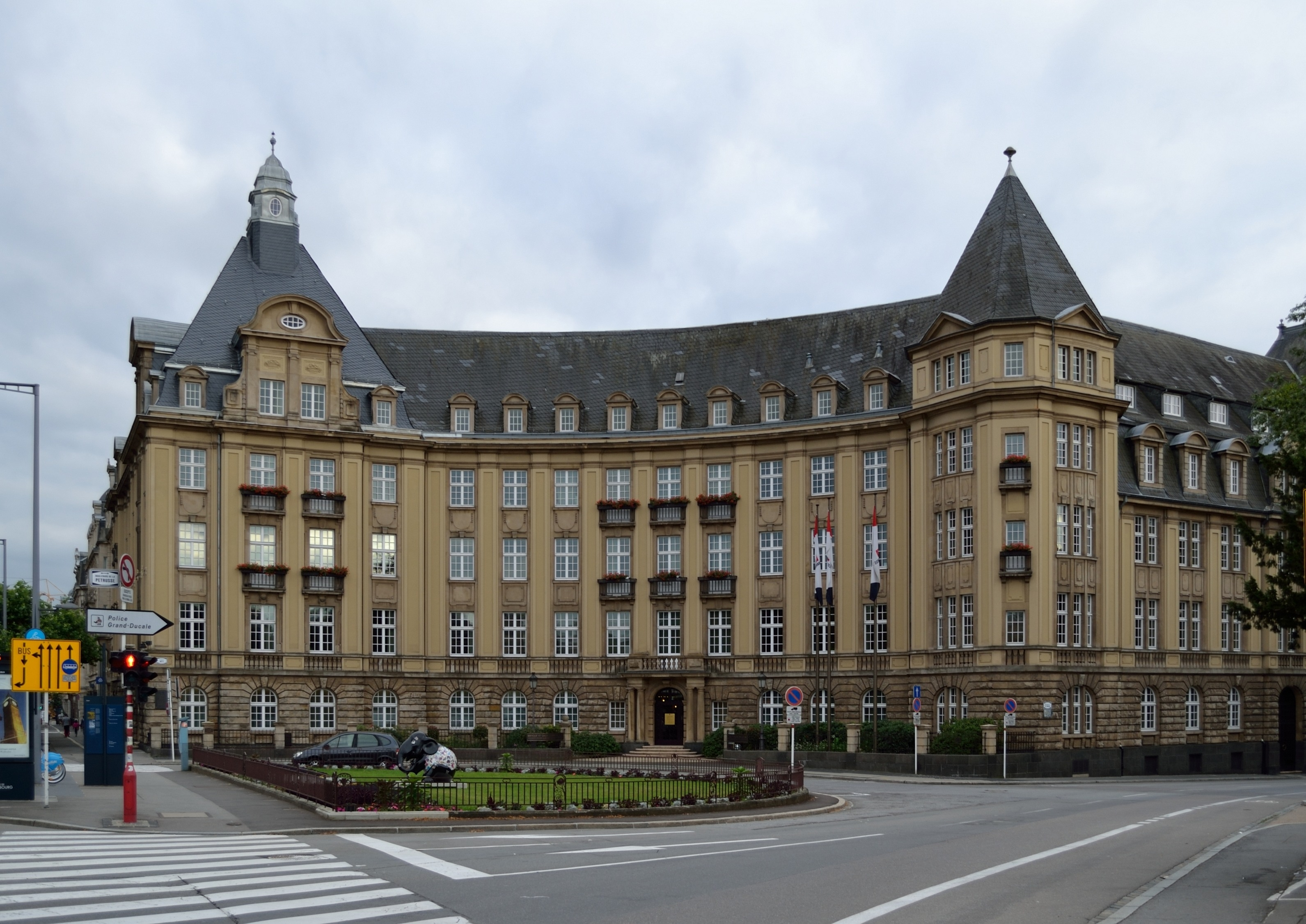
Former headquarters of the High Authority in Luxembourg

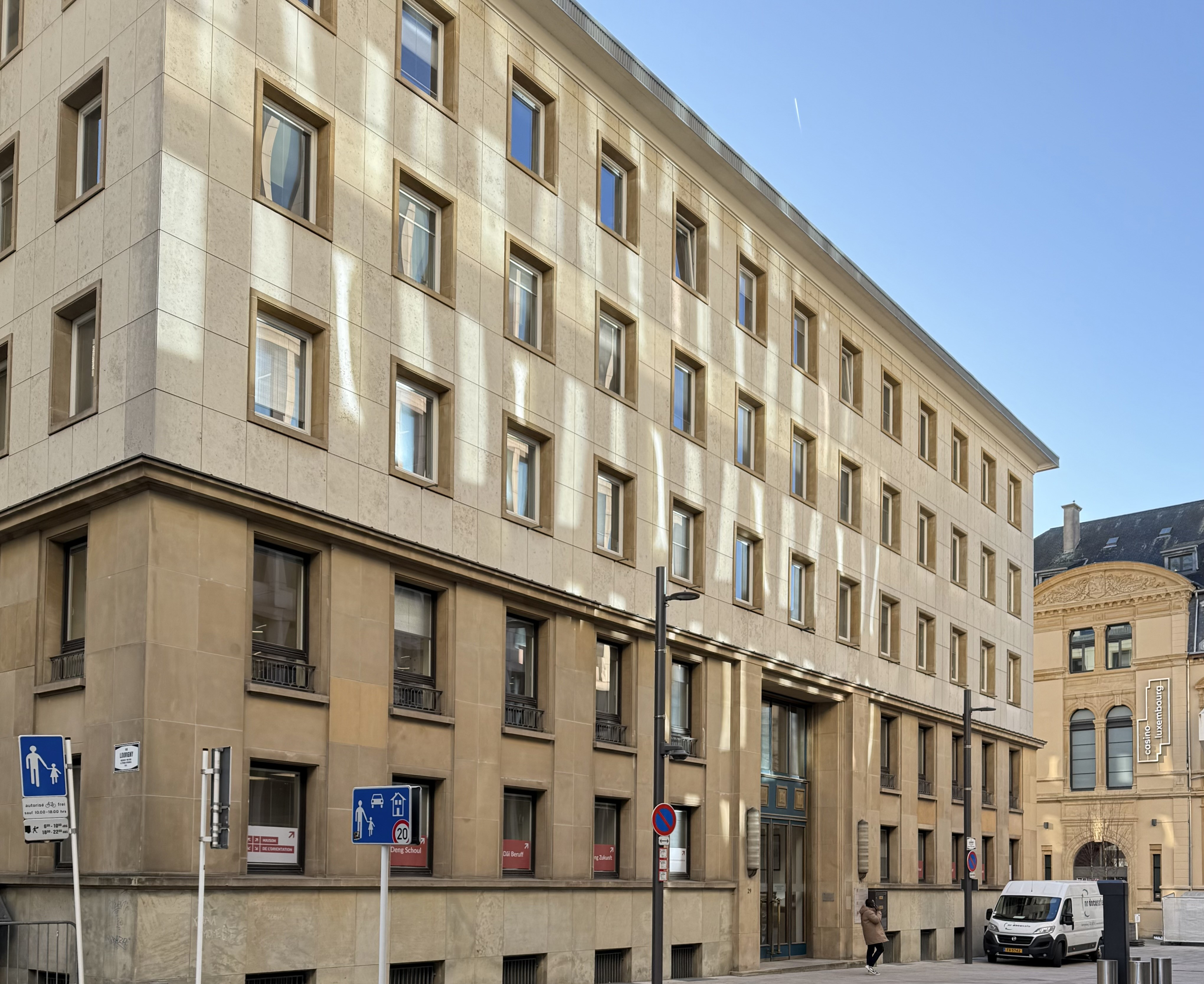
Office building erected for the ECSC by the Luxembourg state, rue Aldringen in the Ville Haute

The institutions of the ECSC were the High Authority, the Common Assembly, the Special Council of Ministers and the Court of Justice. A Consultative Committee was established alongside the High Authority, as a fifth institution representing producers, workers, consumers and dealers (article 18). These institutions were merged in 1967 with those of the European Community, except for the Consultative Committee, which continued to be independent until the expiration of the Treaty of Paris in 2002.

The Treaty stated that the location of the institutions would be decided by common accord of the members, yet the issue was hotly contested. As a temporary compromise, the institutions were provisionally located in the City of Luxembourg, while the Assembly was based in Strasbourg.

=== High Authority ===
The High Authority (the predecessor to the European Commission) was a nine-member executive body which governed the ECSC. The Authority consisted of nine members in office for a term of six years, appointed by the governments of the six signatories. Two were from each of France, Germany and Italy; and one from each of Belgium, Luxembourg, and the Netherlands. These members appointed a person among themselves to be President of the High Authority.

Despite being appointed by agreement of national governments acting together, the members were to pledge not to represent their national interest, but rather took an oath to defend the general interests of the Community as a whole. Their independence was aided by members being barred from having any occupation outside the Authority or having any business interests (paid or unpaid) during their tenure and for three years after they left office. To further ensure impartiality, one third of the membership was to be renewed every two years (article 10).

The Authority had a broad area of competence to ensure the objectives of the treaty were met and that the common market functioned smoothly. The High Authority could issue three types of legal instruments: Decisions, which were entirely binding laws; Recommendations, which had binding aims but the methods were left to member states; and Opinions, which had no legal force.

Up to the merger in 1967, the authority had five Presidents followed by an interim President serving for the final days.

=== Common Assembly ===
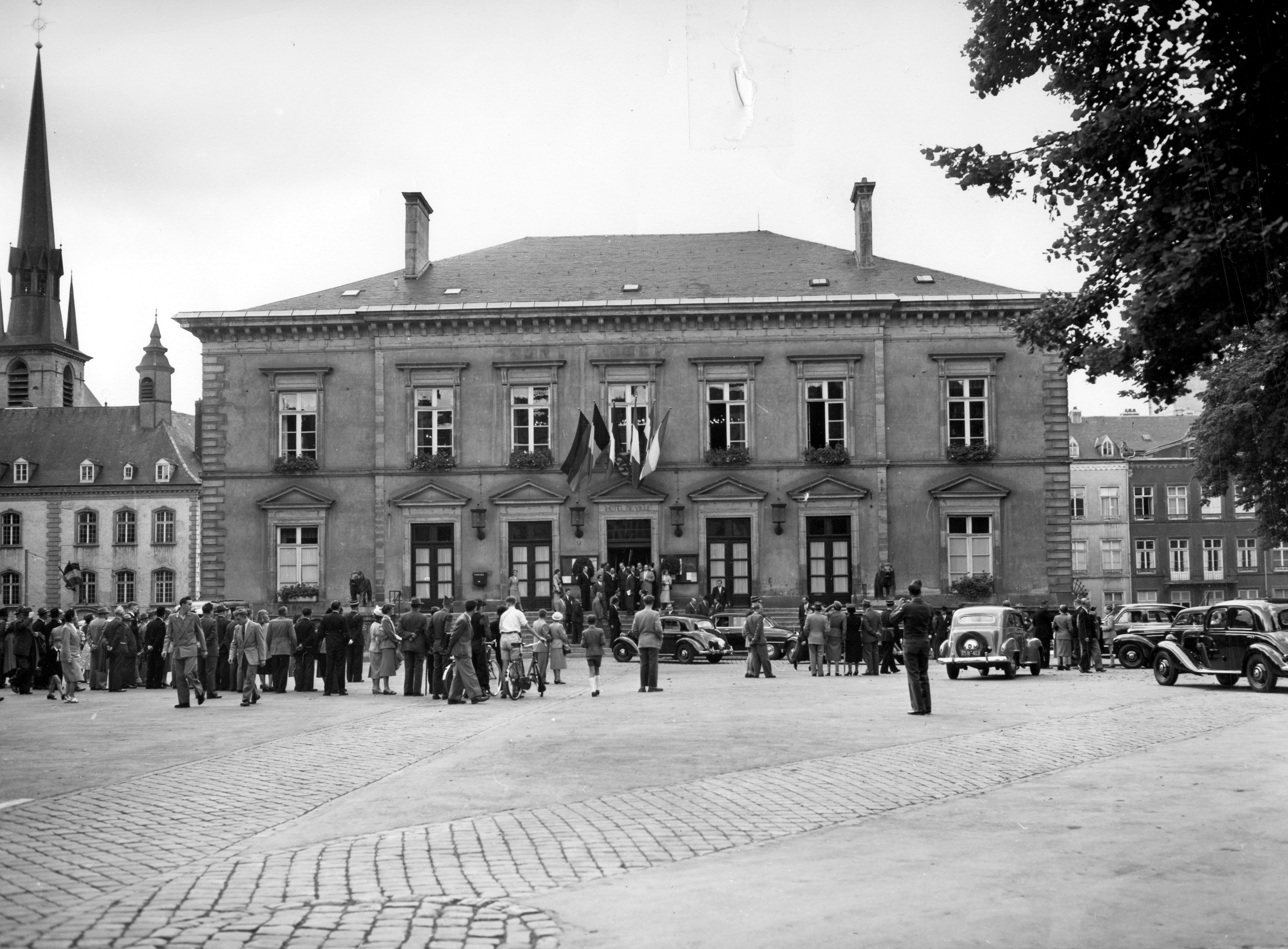
The inaugural meeting of the High Authority took place at Luxembourg City Hall (pictured in 1952).

The Common Assembly (the forerunner to the European Parliament) was composed of 78 representatives: 18 from each of France, Germany, and Italy; 10 from Belgium and the Netherlands; and 4 from Luxembourg (article 21). It exercised supervisory powers over the executive High Authority (article 20). The Common Assembly representatives were to be national MPs delegated each year by their Parliaments to the Assembly or directly elected "by universal suffrage" (article 21), though in practice it was the former, as there was no requirement for elections until the Treaty of Rome, and no actual election until 1979, as Rome required agreement in the council on the electoral system first. However, to emphasise that the chamber was not a traditional international organisation composed of representatives of national governments, the Treaty of Paris used the term "representatives of the peoples". Some hoped the Community would use the institutions (Assembly, Court) of the Council of Europe, and The Treaty's Protocol on Relations with the Council of Europe encouraged links between the two institutions' assemblies. The ECSC Assembly was intended as a democratic counter-weight and check to the High Authority, to advise but also to have power to sack the Authority (article 24). The first President (akin to a Speaker) was Paul-Henri Spaak.

=== Special Council of Ministers ===
The Special Council of Ministers (the forerunner to the Council of the European Union) was composed of representatives of national governments. The presidency was held by each state for a period of three months, rotating between them in alphabetical order. One of its key aspects was the harmonisation of the work of the High Authority and that of national governments. The council was also required to issue opinions on certain areas of work of the High Authority. Issues relating only to coal and steel were in the exclusive domain of the High Authority, and in these areas the council (unlike the modern council) could only act as a scrutiny on the Authority. However, areas outside coal and steel required the consent of the council.

=== Court of Justice ===
The Court of Justice was to ensure the observation of ECSC law along with the interpretation and application of the Treaty. The Court was composed of seven judges, appointed by common accord of the national governments for six years. There were no requirements that the judges had to be of a certain nationality, simply that they be qualified and that their independence be beyond doubt. The Court was assisted by two Advocates General.

=== Consultative Committee ===
The Consultative Committee (forerunner to the European Economic and Social Committee) had between 30 and 51 members equally divided between producers, workers, consumers and dealers in the coal and steel sector (article 18). There were no national quotas, and the treaty required representatives of European associations to organise their own democratic procedures. They were to establish rules to make their membership fully representative for democratic organised civil society. Members were appointed for two years and were not bound by any mandate or instruction of the organisations which appointed them. The committee had a plenary assembly, bureau and president. Nomination of these members remained in the hands of the council. The High Authority was obliged to consult the committee in certain cases where it was appropriate and to keep it informed. The Consultative Committee remained separate (despite the merger of the other institutions) until 2002, when the Treaty expired and its duties were taken over by the Economic and Social Committee (ESC).

== Members ==
The 15 ECSC (EU) members in 2002

Date	Members	Members added
23 July 1952	6	The Inner Six: Belgium, France, West Germany, Italy, Luxembourg and the Netherlands
1 January 1973	9	Denmark, Ireland and the United Kingdom
1 January 1981	10	Greece
1 January 1986	12	Portugal and Spain
1 January 1995	15	Austria, Finland and Sweden

After the original six members, the ECSC expanded to all members of the European Economic Community (later renamed the European Community) and the European Union (15 countries in 2002 at the time of the expiry of the Treaty of Paris).

== Achievements and shortcomings ==
=== Major goal: ending war between member states ===
Schuman described the goal as to "make war not only unthinkable but materially impossible" for signatory states. This is described in the treaty's preamble. It commences by quoting the French Government Proposal of Schuman:

"World peace cannot be safeguarded without creative measures commensurate with the dangers which threaten it". Europe had been at the centre of world wars. For this, the Community created the world's first international anti-cartel agency. Treaty Chapters VI Ententes et Concentrations and VII on the Free Market describe joint action against cartels and trusts, which were instrumental in world war arms races, and activities leading to the disruption of the free market.

The six founding member states are now living in the longest period of peace in more than 2,000 years of their history.

=== Economic ===
The economic mission of the ECSC (article 2) was to "contribute to economic expansion, the development of employment and the improvement of the standard of living in participating countries". Writing in Le Monde in 1970, Gilbert Mathieu argued the Community had little effect on coal and steel production, which was influenced more by global trends. From 1952, oil, gas, and electricity became competitors to coal, so the 28% reduction in the amount of coal mined in the Six had little connection with the Treaty of Paris. However, the Treaty caused costs to be reduced by the abolition of discriminatory railway tariffs, and this promoted trade between members: steel trade increased tenfold. The High Authority also issued 280 modernization loans, which helped the industry to improve output and reduce costs.

Mathieu claims the ECSC failed to achieve several fundamental aims of the Treaty of Paris. He argues that the "pool" did not prevent the resurgence of large coal and steel groups, such as the Konzerne, which helped Adolf Hitler build his war machine. The cartels and major companies re-emerged, leading to apparent price fixing. Furthermore, the Community failed to define a common energy policy. Mathieu also argues that the ECSC fell short of ensuring an upward equalisation of pay of workers within the industry. These failures could be put down to overambition in a short period of time, or that the goals were merely political posturing to be ignored.

The ECSC's greatest achievements relate to welfare issues, according to Mathieu. Some miners had extremely poor housing, and thus, over a period of 15 years, the ECSC financed 112,500 flats for workers, paying US$1,770 per flat, enabling workers to buy a home they could not have otherwise afforded. The ECSC also paid half the occupational redeployment costs of those workers who had lost their jobs as coal and steel facilities began to close down. Combined with regional redevelopment aid, the ECSC spent $150 million (835 million francs) creating around 100,000 jobs, a third of which were offered to unemployed coal and steel workers. The welfare guarantees invented by the ECSC were copied and extended by several of the Six to workers outside the coal and steel sectors.

Far more important than creating Europe's first social and regional policy, Robert Schuman argued that the ECSC introduced European peace. It involved the continent's first European tax. This was a flat tax, a levy on production with a maximum rate of one percent. Given that the European Community countries are now experiencing the longest period of peace in more than seventy years, this has been described by a European newspaper as the cheapest tax for peace in history.

== See also ==
- Energy Community
- Energy policy of the European Union
- Flag of the European Coal and Steel Community
- History of the European Union
- History of the Ruhr District
- Industrial plans for Germany
- Monnet plan
- Schuman Declaration
- Supranational union
- Supranationalism
