= European Commissioner for Economic Affairs =

Member of the EU Commission

European Commissioner for Economy and Productivity
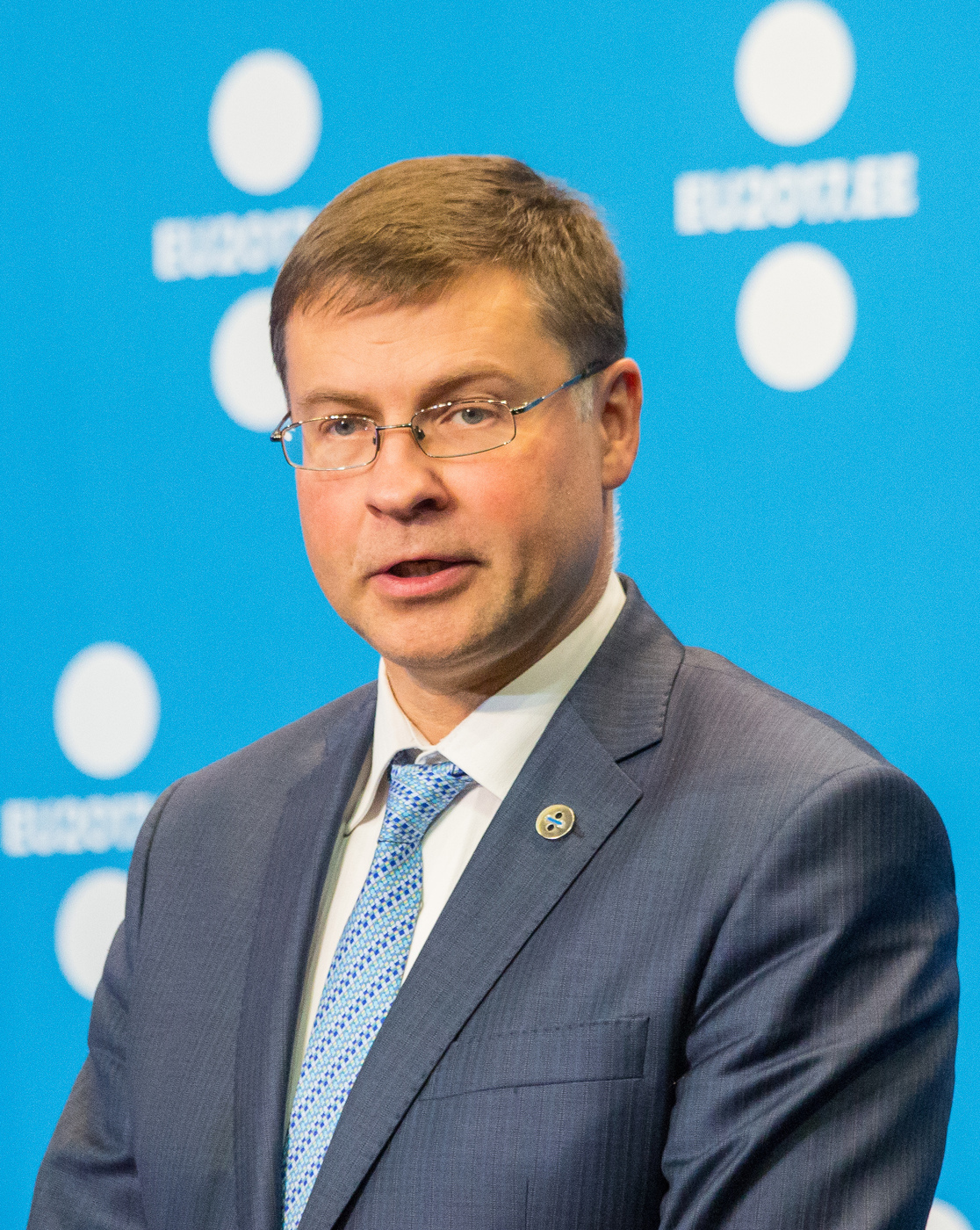
- Incumbent; Valdis Dombrovskis since 1 December 2024
- Appointer: Ursula von der Leyen
- Term length: Five years
- Inaugural holder: Robert Marjolin
- Formation: 1958
- Salary: €19,909.89 per month
- Website: European Commission

The European Commissioner for Economic Affairs is the member of the European Commission responsible for economic and financial affairs. The position was previously titled Commissioner for Economic and Monetary Affairs and the Euro and European Vice President for the Euro and Social Dialogue from 2014 to 2019. The current executive vice president is Valdis Dombrovskis (EPP).

== Responsibilities ==
The post is responsible for the European Union's economic, financial and monetary affairs, often combined with similar portfolios. This position is highly important due to the weight the European Union has economically worldwide (See: Economy of the European Union). It has grown particularly with the late 2000s recession and is now having to deal with getting the EU's public finances back into shape, as many members are breaking EU rules on budget deficits.

The DG responsible to the Commissioner is the Directorate-General for Economic and Financial Affairs, headed by Marco Buti.

There are a number of other economic-related Commissioner positions in the college:

- Industry and Entrepreneurship – Office abolished
- Internal Market – Office vacant
- Competition – currently Margrethe Vestager
- Trade – currently Valdis Dombrovskis
- Economy – currently Paolo Gentiloni
- Financial Programming and the Budget – currently Johannes Hahn
- Energy – currently Kadri Simson
- Consumer Protection – Office abolished

There have been suggestions from politicians such as Ségolène Royal that there should be an economic government for the eurozone, and at the start of the Barroso Commission Germany suggested an economic "super-commissioner" – which could see a change in this position. That idea however was dropped but the Enterprise and Industry Commissioner was strengthened in response.

In October 2011 the position gained added responsibility for the euro, particularly eurozone reform and bail outs, and was made a vice president.

== List of commissioners ==
#	Name	Country	Period	Commission
1	Robert Marjolin	France	1958–1967	Hallstein Commission
2	Raymond Barre	France	1967–1973	Rey Commission; Malfatti Commission; Mansholt Commission
3	Wilhelm Haferkamp	West Germany	1973–1977	Ortoli Commission
4	François-Xavier Ortoli	France	1977–1985	Jenkins Commission; Thorn Commission
5	Henning Christophersen	Denmark	1985–1995	Delors Commission
6	Yves-Thibault de Silguy	France	1995–1999	Santer Commission
7	Pedro Solbes	Spain	1999–2004	Prodi Commission
8	Joaquín Almunia	Spain	2004	Prodi Commission
9	Siim Kallas	Estonia	2004	Prodi Commission
10	Joaquín Almunia	Spain	2004–2010	Barroso Commission I
11	Olli Rehn	Finland	2010–2014	Barroso Commission II
12	Valdis Dombrovskis	Latvia	2014–present	Juncker Commission von der Leyen Commission I von der Leyen Commission II

As Economic and Finance Commissioner, Robert Marjolin served in both Hallstein Commissions and Henning Christophersen served in all three Delors Commissions.

== See also ==
- Economy of the European Union
- Eurozone & Euro
- European Central Bank
- European Union Budget
- OLAF
- European Court of Auditors
- Directorate-General for Economic and Financial Affairs
