= History of the European Union (1993–2004) =

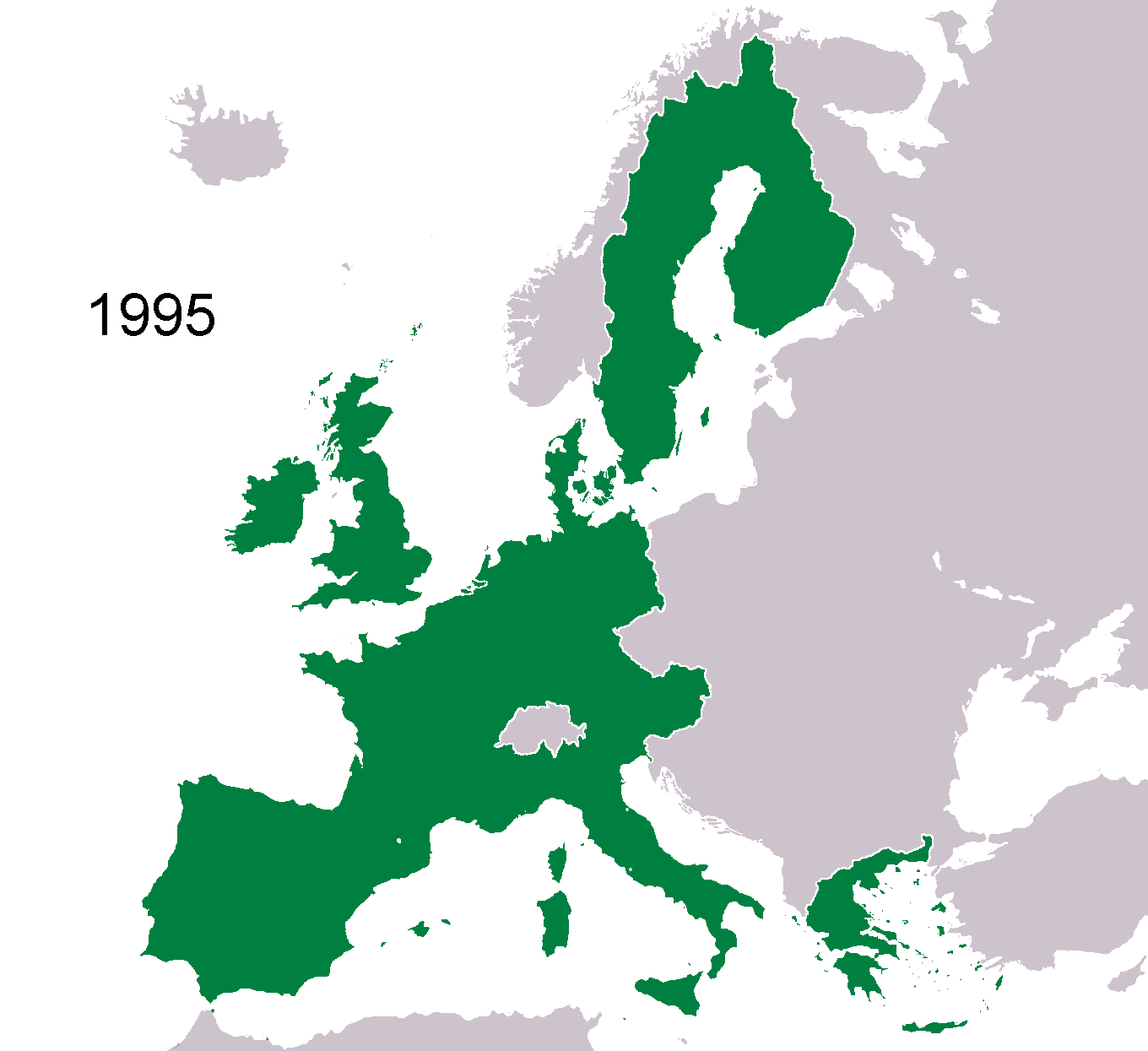
The EU between 1995 and 2004

The history of the European Union between 1993 and 2004 was the period between its creation (replacing the European Economic Community) and the 2004 enlargement. The European Union was created at the dawn of the post–Cold War era and saw a series of successive treaties laying the ground for the euro, foreign policy and future enlargement. Three new member states joined the previous twelve in this period and the European Economic Area extended the reach of the EU's markets to three more.

However the Union would face criticism with its inability to deal with the crisis in the former Yugoslavia and allegations of fraud in the European Commission which led to its mass resignation in 1999. Although the commission's fall was seen as a victory for the European Parliament, it would further entrench the euroscepticism of the post-Delors era and lead to the Socialists losing their status as largest party held since elections began. In the following Prodi Commission, the commission, foreign policy and anti-fraud measures would be strengthened.

== Maastricht Treaty ==
Following the delays in the ratification of the Maastricht Treaty, which led to the Danish opt-outs, the treaty came into force on 1 November 1993 under the third Delors Commission. President Jacques Delors had his Commission's mandate extended to 23 January 1995, at which point the Santer Commission took office. The new European Union introduced the pillar system, formalising European Political Cooperation as the Common Foreign and Security Policy and adding the new area of Justice and Home Affairs. Maastricht also established the Committee of the Regions, which held its inaugural session on 9 to 10 March 1994 with the election of Jacques Blanc as its president. Furthermore, on 25 May, the European Investment Fund was established by the EIB and the European Police Office was created on 26 July 1995 with the signing of the Europol convention.

== President Santer ==
Due to concerns over the proposal of Jean-Luc Dehaene as President of the European Commission, with the United Kingdom not wishing another Jacques Delors, Jacques Santer (then-Prime Minister of Luxembourg) was proposed as a less federalist option. However, due to this. he was seen as being the "second choice" which weakened his position, with the European Parliament approving him only by a narrow majority. He did however flex his powers over the nominations for the other Commissioners. The President gained this power under the Maastricht Treaty that came into force the previous year. On 18 January 1995 he managed to get his Commission approved by Parliament by 416 votes to 103 (a larger majority than expected), and they were appointed by the council on 23 January.

=== 1994 elections ===
On 9 to 12 June 1994, the fourth European elections were held resulting in a Socialist victory. During its first session, 19 to 26 July, Parliament elected Klaus Hänsch as its president and approved Jacques Santer as Commission President. His Commissioners were approved on 18 January 1995 and took office on the 23rd. On 19 July 1997, José María Gil Robles was elected President of the Parliament.

=== Free movement ===
On 1 January 1994 the European Economic Area (EEA) entered into force, allowing European Free Trade Association (EFTA) members Norway and Iceland to enter the Single European Market (created the previous year) without joining the Union, in exchange for financial contributions and taking on of relevant EU law. Switzerland had rejected membership and Liechtenstein joined the following year on 1 May. On 23 February 1995 the ECJ gave the "Bordessa ruling": citizens may export banknotes without prior authorisation (free movement of capital). Later that year on 15 December, it gave the Bosman ruling, ruling that restriction on number of (EU) foreign players in football teams is illegal (free movement of people).

The Schengen Agreement (signed in 1985) came into effect on 26 March 1995 between Belgium, France, Germany, Luxembourg, Netherlands, Portugal and Spain. Austria signed up on 28 April followed by Denmark, Finland and Sweden, alongside non-EU members Norway and Iceland, on 19 December 1996. The EU-Turkey customs union entered into force on 1 January 1996.

=== Amsterdam Treaty ===
The intergovernmental conference leading to the Treaty of Amsterdam opened on 29 March 1996 in Turin. On 22 July 1997, leaders of the Western European Union met and adopted a declaration, to be added to the treaty, defining its role with the EU and NATO. The Treaty was signed by foreign ministers on 2 October. The treaty entered into force on 1 May 1999.

The treaty sought to create an "area of freedom, justice and security" as well as strengthen the CFSP. There would also be institutional reforms to make the Union more democratic and adjust it to enlargement.

Amsterdam also incorporated the conclusions of the 1992 Edinburgh European Council which set out the current arrangements in regards to the seat of the institutions; the Parliament would thus be based in Strasbourg, where it must hold "twelve periods of monthly plenary sessions, including the budget session". However, additional sessions may be held in Brussels, which is where committees must also meet while the secretariat must remain in Luxembourg. The Commission and Council would be based in Brussels however some Council meetings and some departments of the commission would be in Luxembourg which would also host the judicial and financial bodies of the EU. However, the Central Bank would be in Frankfurt and Europol in The Hague.

=== Foreign policy ===
During the 90s, the development EU's Common Foreign and Security Policy (CFSP) was given a strong impetus by the conflicts in the Balkans. The EU failed to react during the beginning of the conflict, and UN peacekeepers from the Netherlands failed to prevent the Srebrenica massacre (July 1995) in Bosnia and Herzegovina, the largest mass murder in Europe since the second world war. The North Atlantic Treaty Organization (NATO) finally had to intervene in the war, forcing the combatants to the negotiation table. On 14 December 1995, the Dayton Agreement was signed in Paris, ending the conflict in Croatia and Bosnia and Herzegovina.

On 24 March 1999, the situation on Kosovo led to an EU CFSP declaration on Kosovo and prompted a NATO intervention in Kosovo and Serbia. While there was greater EU involvement in the Kosovo conflict than in the Bosnian conflict, the failure of the EU to prevent the conflicts in former Yugoslavia, or to bring them to a quick close, heightened the desire for greater EU effectiveness in foreign affairs.

The early foreign policy experience of the EU led to it being emphasised in the Treaty of Amsterdam, which entered into force on 1 May 1999. The treaty created the High Representative with Javier Solana being appointed to fill the post who was also seen by some as Europe's first Foreign Minister. It also led to the 1997 declaration by Western European Union leaders on that organisation's role with the EU and NATO. In response, the Nice Treaty strengthened the High Representative and foreign policy cooperation.

=== Budget crisis ===
Towards the end of 1998 a crisis developed around the community's budget for 1996. There had been allegations of financial mismanagement in the commission. The Parliament decided to refuse to give its approval to the budget, throwing the Commission into crisis. The People's Party attempted to force the resignation of the Commissioners Édith Cresson and Manuel Marín (both members of the Socialists) while the Socialist group still supported the Commission though and attempted a vote of confidence. Eventually a PES proposal based on collective responsibility (not singling out the two socialist Commissioners) was approved and a committee of independent experts was established to investigate.

The committee produced its report on 15 March 1999 and was presented to the Commission and Parliament. It largely cleared most members, aside from Cresson, but concluded that there was growing reluctance of the Commissioners to acknowledge responsibility and that "It was becoming increasingly difficult to find anyone who had the slightest sense of responsibility." In response to the report, PES withdrew their support from the Commission leading to a collapse of support for the commission. Santer announced on evening of the reports publication that the entire Commission had resigned. Édith Cresson went before the European Court of Justice and, in July 2006, was found guilty but was not stripped of her pension. Cresson today is largely held accountable for the fall of Santer, who went on to serve time as an MEP and never fully recovered, and the rest of his Commission.

The immediate effect on the commission was that it became politically weakened and unable to react to the beginning of the Kosovo War and the close of the Agenda 2000 negotiations. The crisis had compounded the already reduced powers of the Commission in favour of the Parliament's legislative power, the council's foreign policy role and the ECB's financial role. However the change with Parliament was the most profound, the previous permanent cooperation between the two bodies came to an end with the shift in power. Due to the crisis, the following Commission rapidly established the anti-fraud watchdog OLAF. and seen as having failed in its duty.

The Commission itself suffered from a loss of trust and reputation, only compounded by the post-Delors mood. Prodi had to deal with increased euroscepticism which helped bring down the Santer Commission. Since the end of the Delors era, pro-integrationism had given way with greater concern about the commission's powers. By just 2000 the Council curbed the commission's powers once more when they believed Prodi overstepped his remit. Meanwhile, Parliament gained the publicity it sought and by exercising its power the council was forced to take increased heed of its views in the appointment of the next Commission. It also showed a Parliament operating with a greater government-opposition dynamic of the two main parties than before. In the following 1999 parliamentary elections turnout did not increase as hoped, but the People's Party did defeat the Socialists, for the first time since elections began, becoming the largest party in Parliament.

== President Prodi ==
On 1 May 1999, Amsterdam Treaty entered into force and on 5 May Parliament approved Romano Prodi as Commission President. Under the new powers of the Amsterdam Treaty, Prodi was described by some as the 'First Prime Minister of Europe'. On 4 June, Javier Solana was appointed secretary general of the council and the new post of High Representative for the Common Foreign and Security Policy.

On 10–13 June 1999 the Fifth European elections were held in all 15 members. On 20 July it elected Nicole Fontaine as its president and it approved the Prodi Commission on 15 September and it subsequently took office. In response to the recent scandal around the Santer Commission, OLAF was set up on 18 June 1999 to fight fraud in the Union's institutions. The Parliament later elected its new president, Pat Cox, on 16 January 2002.

As well as the enlargement and Amsterdam Treaty, the Prodi Commission also saw the signing and enforcement of the Nice Treaty as well as the conclusion and signing of the European Constitution: in which he introduced the "Convention method" of negotiation. The body was however criticised for being lacklustre, with poor communication and failing to make an impact despite major events such as enlargement and the euro. The commission was due to leave office on 31 October 2004, but due to opposition from the European Parliament to the proposed Barroso Commission which would succeed it, it was extended and finally left office on 21 November 2004.

=== Nice Treaty ===
To deal with the impending enlargement in 2004 leaders met in Nice on 7 December 2000 to create a new treaty that would ensure the functioning of the Union with the extra members. The Nice Treaty was signed two months later on 26 February 2001 and came into force on 1 February 2003.

The Commission and the European Parliament were disappointed that the Nice Intergovernmental Conference (IGC) did not adopt many of their proposals for reform of the institutional structure or introduction of new Community powers, such as the appointment of a European Public Prosecutor. The European Parliament threatened to pass a resolution against the Treaty; although it had no formal power of veto, the Italian Parliament threatened that it would not ratify without the European Parliament's support. However, in the end this did not happen and the European Parliament approved the Treaty.

During the ratification period of the Nice Treaty, the European Convention began work on the European Constitution, starting work on 28 February 2002, shortly after the Paris Treaty establishing the ECSC expired on 23 July. On the basis of the work of the European Convention, an Intergovernmental Conference (IGC) was held in Rome on 4 October 2003 to make changes the proposed text. It was signed in Rome on 28 October 2004 by all leaders of the new and old members, but was not ratified. (see also: Lisbon Treaty)

== Economic and Monetary Union ==
On 1 January 1994, the second stage of the EMU began under the Maastricht Treaty with the establishment of the European Monetary Institute. On 16 December 1995, the date for the introduction of the euro was set as 1 January 1999.

On 14 October 1996 the Finnish mark entered the ERM and the Italian lira re-entered the ERM on 25 November. The Greek drachma entered the ERM on 16 January 1998, too late for the 3 May 1998 council meeting where 11 members (the 15, minus Sweden, Denmark, Greece and the United Kingdom) would adopt the euro in 1999. On 1 June the European Central Bank was established. Final meetings are held in December with irrevocable conversion rates being set on 31 December, becoming a live currency as planned the following day.

2000 saw the Commission recommending Greece joining the eurozone, which it did at the start of 2001. However, both Denmark and Sweden rejected the currency in referendums held on 28 September 2000 and 14 September 2003, respectively. On 1 January 2002, the physical euro currency came into circulation in the 12 eurozone states, and became the sole legal currency of 12 eurozone states (Greece included) on 28 February.

== Enlargement ==
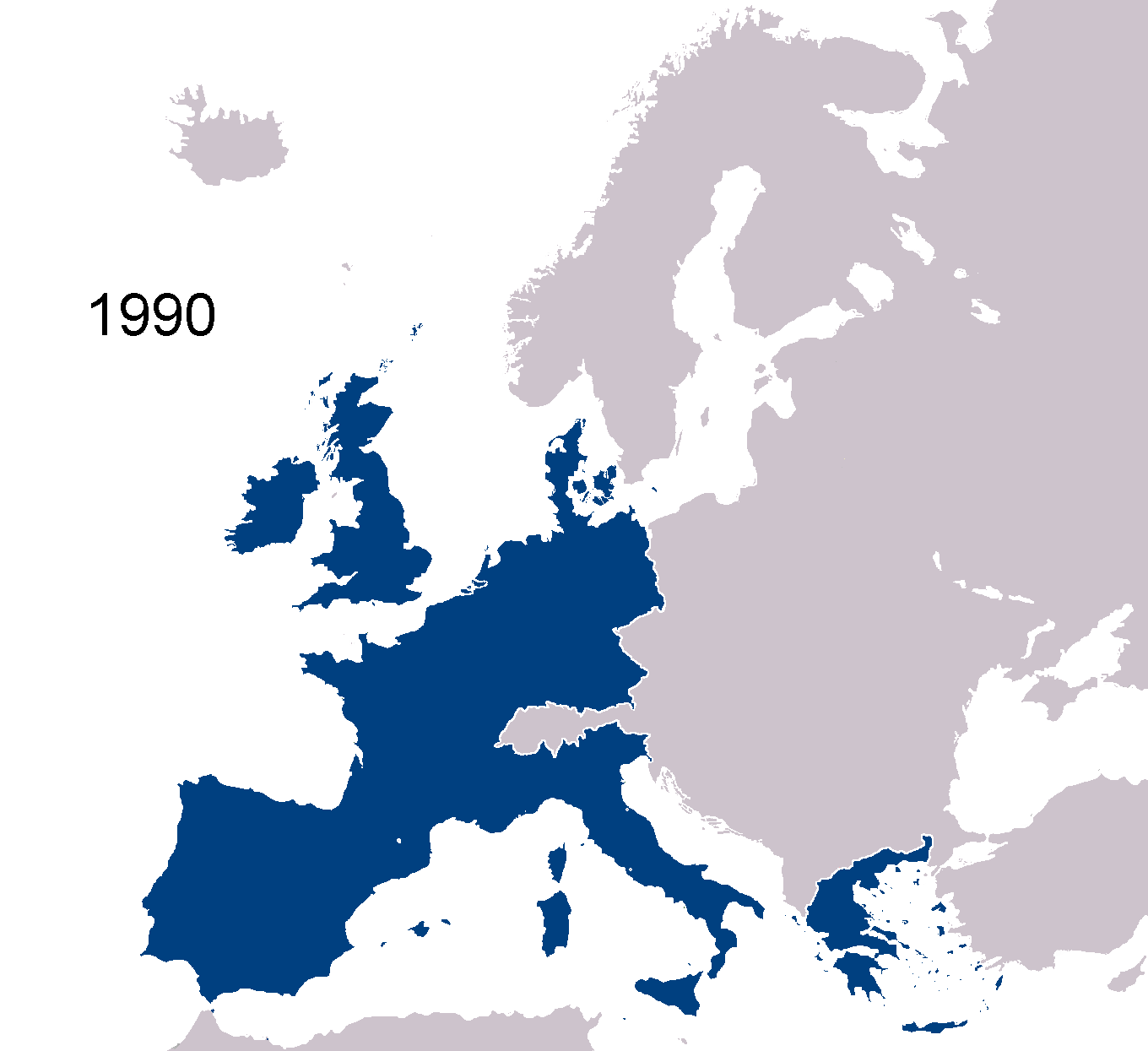
Membership until 1995

1995–2004 EU enlargements

existing members
new members in 1995
Austria
Finland
Sweden

existing members
new members in 2004
Cyprus
Czech Republic
Estonia
Hungary
Latvia
Lithuania
Malta
Poland
Slovakia
Slovenia

On 30 March 1994, accession negotiations concluded with Austria, Finland, Sweden and Norway. Sweden and Finland had applied since the fall of the Iron Curtain; allowing them, as Cold War-neutral countries, to now align themselves with the Union. Their accession treaties were signed on 25 June of that month. Each country held referendums on entry resulting on entry for all except Norway (its second failed referendum);

- Austria – 66.6% in favour (12 June); application submitted in July 1989
- Finland – 56.9% in favour (16 October); application submitted in March 1992 (separate referendum held in Åland)
- Sweden – 52.8% in favour (13 November); application submitted in July 1991
- Norway – 47.8% in favour (28 November); application submitted in December 1992

Austria, Finland and Sweden became EU members on 1 January 1995. Sweden held their elections to the parliament later that year on 17 September. The following year, Austria held its elections on 13 October and Finland on 20 October.

Since the 1990s, numerous states were moving towards membership. Following on from 1995, and aside from the aspirations of Turkey, there were 12 countries advanced on the path to membership. These were: the two Mediterranean countries of Cyprus and Malta; the former Yugoslav republic of Slovenia; and 9 former eastern bloc countries of Estonia, Latvia, Lithuania, Poland, the Czech Republic, Slovakia, Hungary, Romania (where the Snagov Declaration was signed with this aim) and Bulgaria.

It was hoped that Cyprus would join as a unified island. However, northern Cyprus has remained outside the control of the internationally recognised government of the Republic of Cyprus since the Turkish invasion of 1974. The Annan Plan for the resolution of the Cyprus dispute was rejected by Greek Cypriots in a 2004 referendum. The accession treaties were signed on 16 April 2003 in Athens, admitting Malta, Cyprus, Slovenia, Estonia, Latvia, Lithuania, Poland, the Czech Republic, Slovakia, and Hungary. Romania and Bulgaria were not among the 10 chosen to accede in 2004.

Finally, on 1 May 2004, the Union expanded from 15 to 25 members, the largest single expansion in its history. Its population jumped from 381 million to 456 million and its size grew from 3367 to 4104 thousand km^{2} (See Enlargement Statistics). The 10 countries also brought with them 162 MEPs and 10 Commissioners, who joined the Prodi Commission on 1 May.
