= European Commissioner for Financial Services and the Savings and Investments Union =

Member of the EU Commission

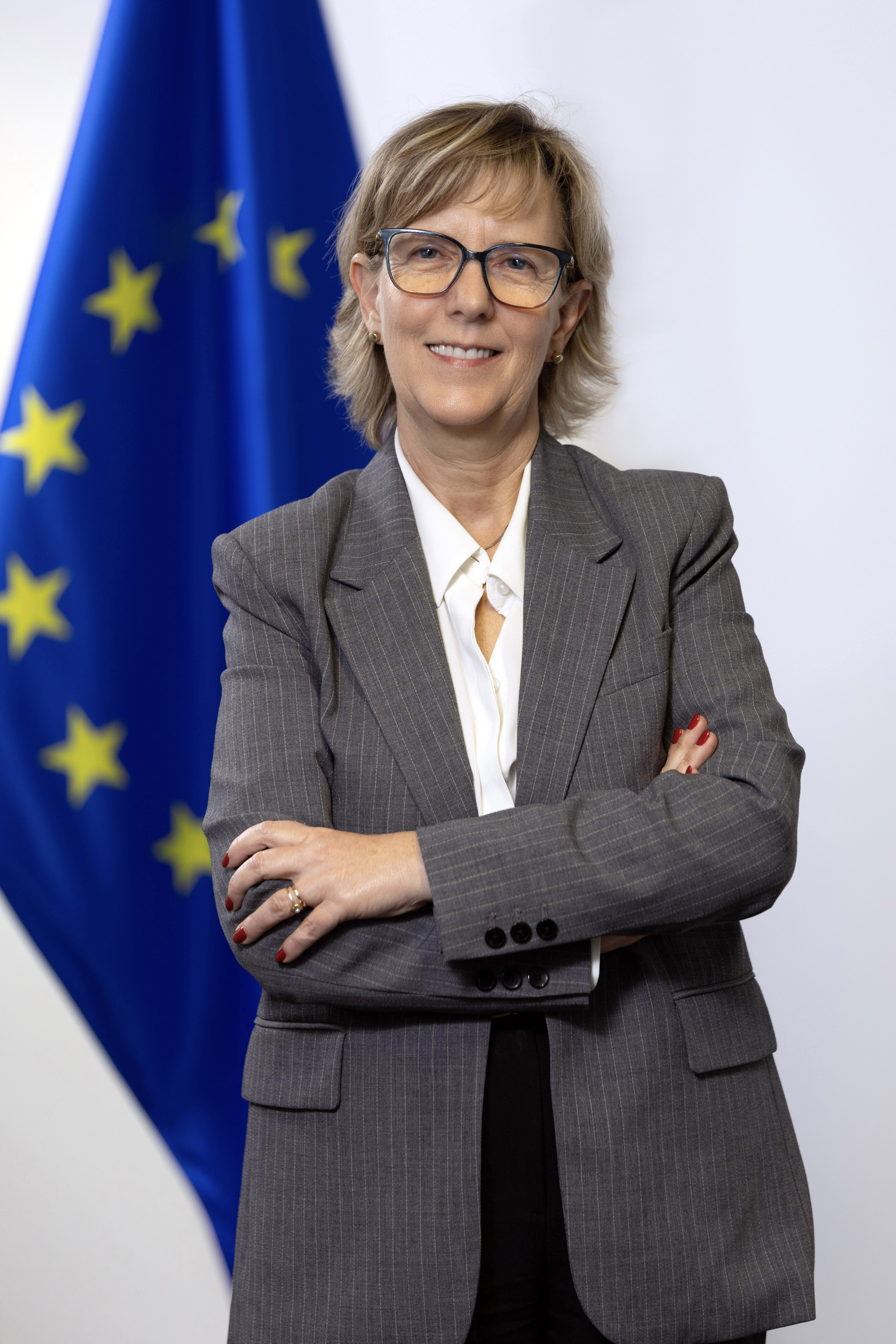
- Incumbent; Maria Luís Albuquerque since 2024
- Appointer: President of the European Commission
- Term length: Five years
- Salary: €19,909.89 per month
- Website: European Commission

The European Commissioner for Financial Services and the Savings and Investments Union is the member of the European Commission responsible for banking and finance. The current officeholder is Maria Luís Albuquerque.

== Responsibilities ==
The post is responsible for the ensuring that financial markets are properly regulated and supervised so that they are stable, competitive and transparent, at the service of jobs and growth. This includes the full implementation of the Banking Union. They are also responsible for establishing a Capital Markets Union by 2019 for all 28 Member States of the EU, and maximising the benefits of capital markets and non-bank financial institutions for the rest of the economy, and in particular SMEs.

In addition, the post is responsible for proposing measures to make financial services work better for consumers and retail investors, and promoting global consistency in regulation and the implementation of agreed standards and principles in cooperation with international partners.

== List of commissioners ==
Name	Country	Period	Commission	Portfolio actual name
Christopher Tugendhat	United Kingdom	1977–1981	Jenkins Commission	Budget and Financial Control, Financial Institutions
Christopher Tugendhat	United Kingdom	1981–1985	Thorn Commission	Budget and Financial Control, Financial Institutions and Taxation (vice-president)
Henning Christophersen	Denmark	1985–1989	Delors Commission I	Budget, financial control, personnel and administration
Abel Matutes	Spain	1986–1989	Delors Commission I	Credit, investments, financial instruments and small & medium-sized enterprises
Sir Leon Brittan	United Kingdom	1989–1992	Delors Commission II	Competition and financial institutions (vice-president)
Peter Schmidhuber	Germany	1993–1994	Delors Commission III	Budget, financial control and the cohesion fund
Anita Gradin	Sweden	1995–1999	Santer Commission	Immigration, Justice & Home Affairs, Financial Control, Anti-fraud and Relations with the European Ombudsman.
Charlie McCreevy	Ireland	2004-2010	Barroso Commission I	Internal Market and Services
Michel Barnier	France	2010-2014	Barroso Commission II	Internal Market and Services
Lord Hill of Oareford	United Kingdom	2014–2016	Juncker Commission	Financial Stability, Financial Services and Capital Markets Union
Valdis Dombrovskis	Latvia	2016–2019	Juncker Commission	Euro and Social Dialogue and Financial Stability, Financial Services and Capital Markets Union (vice-president)
Valdis Dombrovskis	Latvia	2019–2020	Von der Leyen Commission	Financial Markets
Mairead McGuinness	Ireland	2020–2024	Von der Leyen Commission	Financial Stability, Financial Services and Capital Markets Union
Maria Luís Albuquerque	Portugal	2024–incumbent	Von der Leyen Commission	Financial Stability, Financial Services and Capital Markets Union

== See also ==
- Economy of the European Union
- Capital Markets Union
- Eurozone & Euro
- European Central Bank
- European Union Budget
- OLAF
- European Court of Auditors
- Directorate-General for Economic and Financial Affairs
- Savings and Investments Union
