= Christiane Scrivener =

French politician (1925–2024)

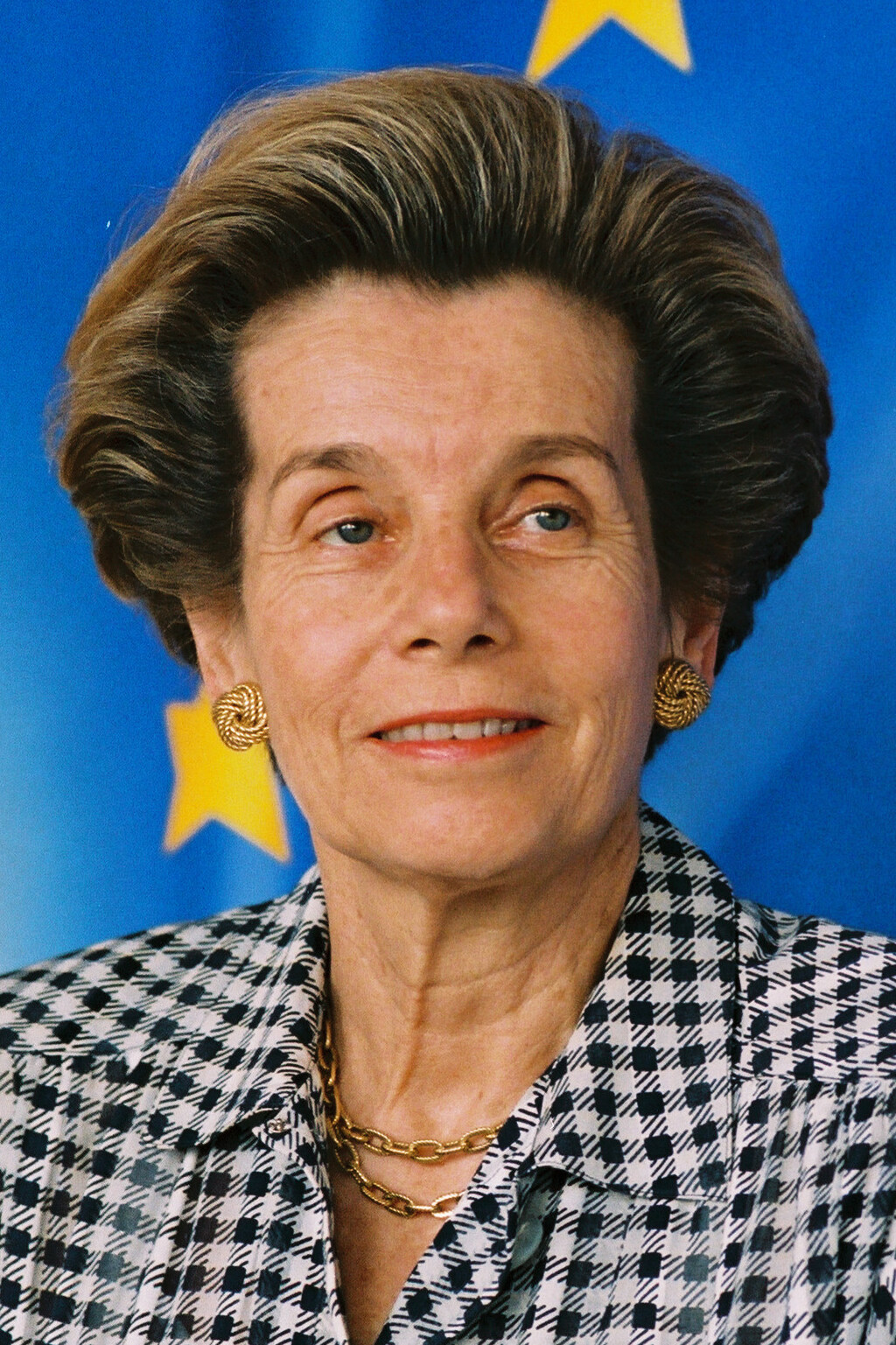
- Official portrait, 1989

European Commissioner for Taxation and Customs Union (Note: Also Consumer Protection from 1993.)
- In office 6 January 1989 – 23 January 1995
- President: Jacques Delors
- Preceded by: Henning Christophersen
- Succeeded by: Yves-Thibault de Silguy

Member of the European Parliament
- In office 1979–1989

Personal details
- Born: Christiane Fries; 1 September 1925 Mulhouse, France
- Died: 8 April 2024 (aged 98) Paris, France
- Party: Republican Party
- Spouse: Pierre Scrivener (m. 1944)
- Children: 1
- Education: University of Paris; Harvard Business School

Christiane Scrivener (née Fries; 1 September 1925 – 8 April 2024) was a French politician who was a member of Valéry Giscard d'Estaing's Republican Party (now replaced by Alain Madelin's Liberal Democracy).

== Life and career ==
Christiane Scrivener was born in Mulhouse, France on 1 September 1925.

Scrivener was Secretary of State of Trade for Consumers' protection between 1976 and 1978, first in Jacques Chirac's and then in Raymond Barre's cabinet. In this capacity she spearheaded several legislative changes, including an Act to protect the information of consumers on products and services (loi sur la protection et l'information des consommateurs de produits et de services, 1978), well known under the name of loi Scrivener.

Scrivener was then elected a Member of the European Parliament (1979–1984).

In 1989, she became the European Communities Commissioner for Taxes, Revenue Harmonization and Consumer Policies in the Delors Commission, a position she retained until 1995.

Scrivener died on 8 April 2024 in Paris, aged 98.

== See also ==
- Feminism in France (for the representation of women in government)

== Sources ==
- guide2womenleaders.com
