= European Commissioner for Economy =

Member of the EU Commission

European Commissioner for Economy and Productivity
- Flag of Europe

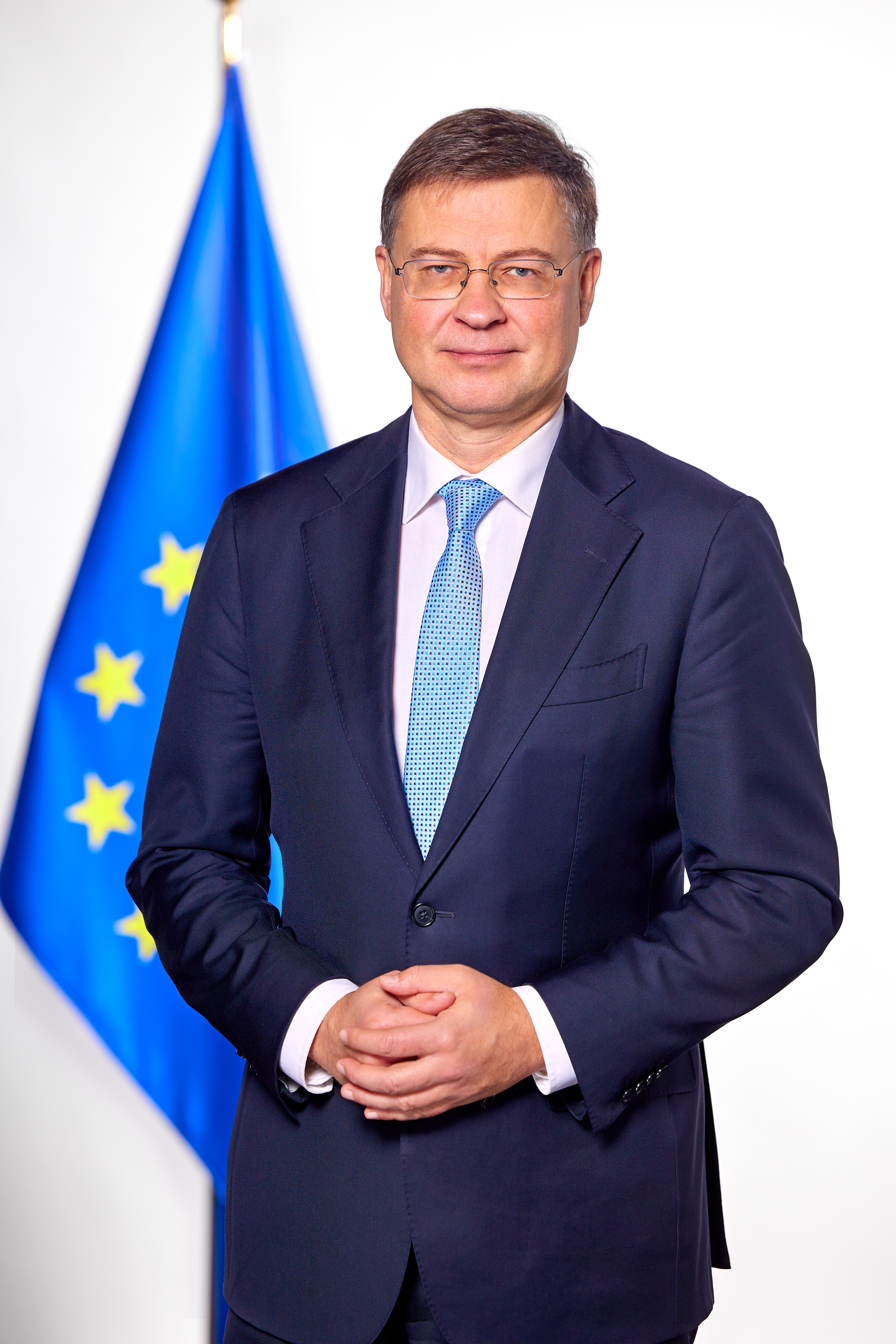
- Incumbent; Valdis Dombrovskis since 1 December 2024
- European Commission
- Member of: European Commission
- Reports to: President of the European Commission
- Term length: 5 years
- Inaugural holder: Robert Marjolin
- Formation: 1958

The European Commissioner for Economy and Productivity (Note: The portfolio has evolved over time, with its official title changing to reflect shifting priorities. Key names include: Commissioner for Economic and Financial Affairs, Taxation and Customs, and Commissioner for Taxation and Customs Union, Audit and Anti-Fraud.) is the member of the European Commission responsible for the European Union’s economic and fiscal policy, including surveillance of national budgets and coordination of economic governance. The Commissioner leads the Directorate-General for Economic and Financial Affairs (DG ECFIN) and plays a central role in the implementation of the European Semester and the enforcement of the Stability and Growth Pact.

The European Commissioner for Economy historically oversaw a broader range of responsibilities than today. In addition to economic and fiscal policy, past holders of the role were also responsible for financial affairs, investments, employment, taxation, customs and credit regulation. Over time, many of these functions have been reassigned to other Commissioners, leaving the Economy Commissioner focused primarily on macroeconomic governance, budgetary surveillance, and coordination with Member States.

The current Commissioner is Valdis Dombrovskis, who has held the office since 1 December 2024.

== List of Commissioners ==
No.	Portrait	Name	Term	Party		Commission	Member state	Portfolio also included
No.	Portrait	Name	Term	European	National	Commission	Member state	Portfolio also included
1		Robert Marjolin	1958–1967	SOC	SFIO	Hallstein I Hallstein II	France	Financial Affairs (Note: Concurrently serving as Vice-President of the European Commission)
2		Raymond Barre	1967–1973	Independent (Note: Associated with the Union for French Democracy)		Rey Malfatti Mansholt	France	Financial Affairs (Note: Concurrently serving as Vice-President of the European Commission in the Rey Commission)
3		Wilhelm Haferkamp	1973–1977	SOC	SPD	Ortoli	West Germany	Finance, Investments
4		François-Xavier Ortoli	1977–1985	EPP	RPR	Jenkins Thorn	France	Finance and Credit, Investments
5		Alois Pfeiffer	1985–1987	SOC	SPD	Delors I	West Germany	Employment (Note: Portfolio briefly shared with Abel Matutes when Spain joined the European Communities in 1986.)
6		Peter Schmidhuber	1987–1989	EPP	CSU	Delors I	West Germany	Employment
7		Henning Christophersen	1989–1995	ALDE	V	Delors II Delors III	Denmark	
8		Yves-Thibault de Silguy	1995–1999	EPP	UMP	Santer	France	Credit, Investments
9		Pedro Solbes	1999–2004	PES	PSOE	Prodi	Spain	
10		Joaquín Almunia	2004–2010	PES	PSOE	Prodi Barroso I	Spain	
* (Note: Acting Commissioner from 9 February to 27 February 2010)		Siim Kallas	2004	ALDE	Reform	Prodi	Estonia	
11		Olli Rehn	2010–2014	ALDE	C	Barroso II	Finland	
12		Pierre Moscovici	2014–2019	PES	PS	Juncker	France	Taxation, Customs
13		Paolo Gentiloni	2019–2024	PES	PD	von der Leyen I	Italy	
14		Valdis Dombrovskis	2024–present	EPP	V	von der Leyen II	Latvia	Commissioner for Economy and Productivity and Commissioner for Implementation and Simplification

== See also ==
- Directorate-General for Economic and Financial Affairs
- European Union withholding tax
- EU VAT
- Stability and Growth Pact
