= Edoardo Martino =

Italian politician (1910–1999)

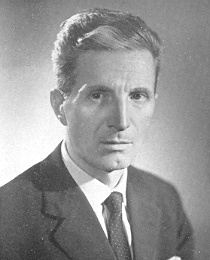

European Commissioner for External Relations
- In office 1967–1970
- President: Jean Rey
- Preceded by: Jean Rey
- Succeeded by: Jean-François Deniau

Personal details
- Born: 20 April 1910
- Died: 5 December 1999 (aged 89)
- Political party: Christian Democracy

Edoardo Angelo Martino (20 April 1910 – 5 December 1999) was an Italian Christian-democratic politician. He was a member of the Italian Chamber of Deputies from 1948 to 1963.

He served as a European Commissioner from 1967 to 1970, as Commissioner for External Relations in the Rey Commission.
