= European Commissioner for Energy and Housing =

Member of the EU Commission

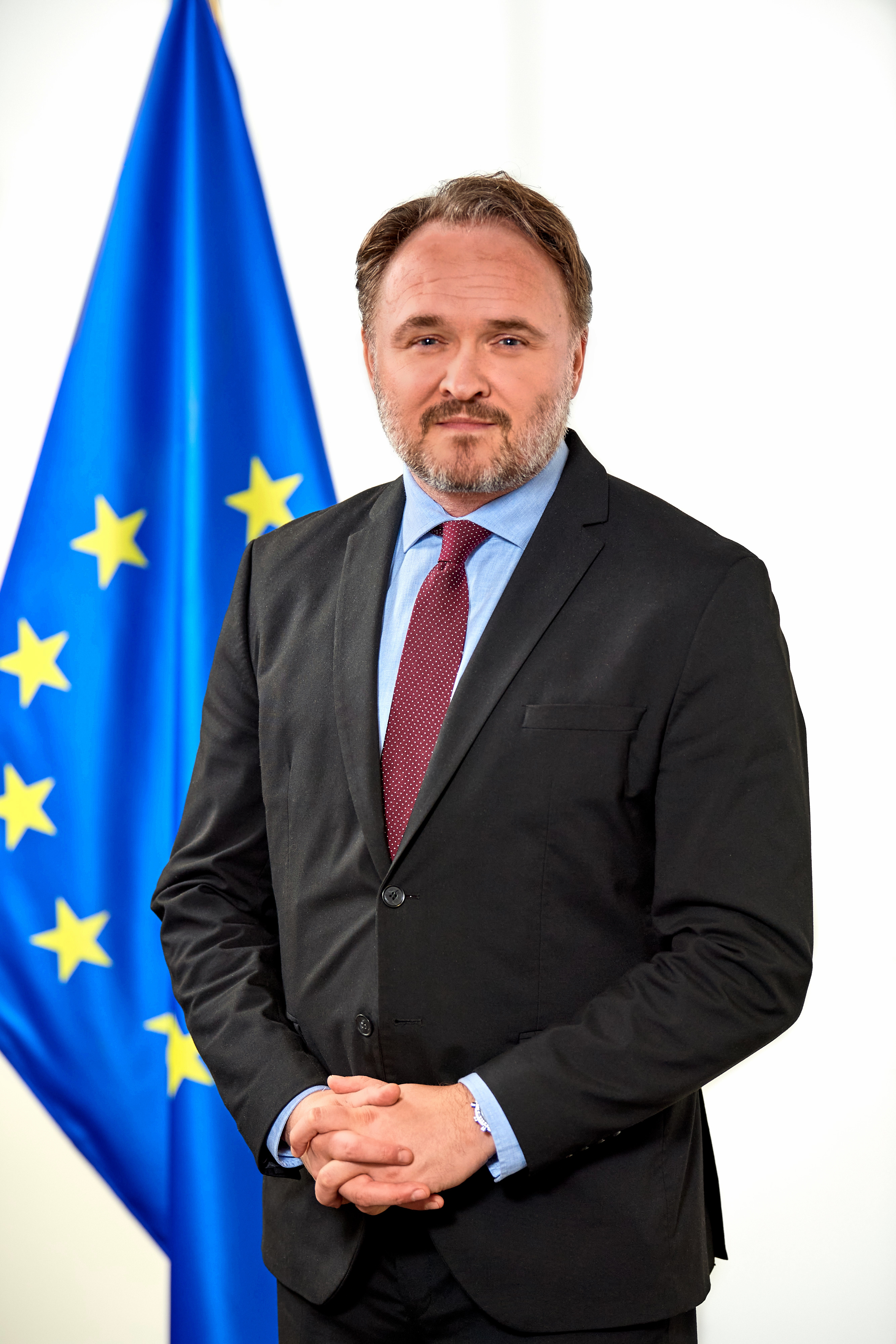
- Incumbent; Dan Jørgensen since 1 December 2024
- Appointer: President of the European Commission
- Term length: Five years
- Inaugural holder: Wilhelm Haferkamp
- Formation: 1958
- Website: https://commission.europa.eu/about/organisation/college-commissioners/dan-jorgensen_en

The European Commissioner for Energy and Housing is a member of the European Commission. The current Commissioner is Dan Jørgensen, in office since 1 December 2024.

== Responsibilities ==
The Commissioner holds responsibility for the European Union's energy policy as well as nuclear issues (Euratom). It was previously a backwater in the commission but has now become sought after as the European energy policy has been developed. The Commissioner for Energy has to deal with ongoing gas disputes between Russia and Ukraine which threaten European supplies, reduce dependence on Russian energy and reduce carbon emissions.

The Directorate-General serving this Commissioner is the Directorate-General for Energy, which was combined with Transport prior to 2010.

== Miguel Arias Cañete (2014–2019) ==
A member of the centre-right People's Party, Arias served as Minister for Agriculture, Food and Environment in the Spanish Government from 2011 until 2014, before being selected to head his Party List in the European Parliamentary elections.

Arias Cañete was nominated as EU Commissioner for Energy and Climate Action in the Juncker Commission and took office on 1 November 2014.

== Günther Oettinger (2010–2014) ==
Günther Oettinger was appointed as the new Energy Commissioner in February 2010. However he was criticised for corruption and avoidance of EU law in his home state. His language skills have also been criticised and his nomination was met with confusion in Brussels.

== Andris Piebalgs (2004–2010) ==
During his hearing with the European Parliament, Piebalgs stressed the importance of the environment in energy policy and was cautious of nuclear power. He received strong backing from the Parliament. He outlined his priorities as;

1. Achieving a true internal market
2. Energy efficiency: everyone can make a difference
3. Increase the share of renewable energy
4. Increased investments in technology
5. Safety and security of nuclear power
6. Make it easier for Member States to help each other in energy crisis
7. Developing external energy policy relations

The European Union is an active supporter of the Kyoto Protocol, which it signed alongside its member-states. In March 2007 the Union committed itself to cut CO_{2} emissions by 20 per cent by 2020. There is also a desire to reduce dependency on Russian energy supplies following the disputes between Russia and Belarus and Ukraine. In April 2007 five southern European countries signed a deal to build an oil pipeline (the Pan-European Oil Pipeline) from the Black Sea to Italy which will help diversify energy sources.

== List of commissioners ==
#	Name	Country	Period	Commission
1	Wilhelm Haferkamp	West Germany	1967–1970	Rey Commission
2	Wilhelm Haferkamp	West Germany	1970–1972	Malfatti Commission
3	Wilhelm Haferkamp	West Germany	1972–1973	Mansholt Commission
4	Henri François Simonet	Belgium	1973–1977	Ortoli Commission
5	Guido Brunner	West Germany	1977–1981	Jenkins Commission
6	Étienne Davignon	Belgium	1981–1985	Thorn Commission
7	Nicolas Mosar	Luxembourg	1985–1989	Delors Commission I
8	António Cardoso e Cunha	Portugal	1989–1993	Delors Commission II
9	Marcelino Oreja	Spain	1993–1994	Delors Commission III
10	Abel Matutes	Spain	1994–1995	Delors Commission III
11	Christos Papoutsis	Greece	1995–1999	Santer Commission
12	Loyola de Palacio	Spain	1999–2004	Prodi Commission
13	Andris Piebalgs	Latvia	2004–2010	Barroso Commission I
14	Günther Oettinger	Germany	2010–2014	Barroso Commission II
15	Miguel Arias Cañete	Spain	2014–2019	Juncker Commission
16	Kadri Simson	Estonia	2019–2024	von der Leyen Commission I
17	Dan Jørgensen	Denmark	2024–	von der Leyen Commission II

== See also ==
- European Commissioner
- Directorate-General for Energy
- Energy Community
- Energy Charter Treaty
