= Royal Institute of European Studies =

Spanish think tank and graduate school

Coordinates: 41.65351°N 0.88326°W

The Royal Institute of European Studies (RIEE) (Spanish: Real Insituto de Estudios Europeos) is a Spanish think tank and a graduate school dedicated to research and post graduate education in subjects related to the European Union. The Royal Institute is based in Zaragoza, Spain.

== Master in European Union ==
The institute awards a master's degree in European Union, in collaboration with the Spanish Ministry of Foreign Affairs, the European Commission and the European Parliament. It is mainly based in Zaragoza with different work visits to several institutions in Brussels, Strasbourg, Geneva, Luxembourg, Madrid or Frankfurt.

=== Promotions ===
Academic years at the RIEE are known as promotions, and are named by the students after outstanding Pro-European people.

- I Promotion. Jacques Delors (1988–89)
- II Promotion. Giulio Andreotti (1989–90)
- III Promotion. Marcelino Oreja (1990–91)
- IV Promotion. Carlos Westendorp (1991–92)
- V Promotion. Abel Matutes (1992–93)
- VI Promotion. Javier Elorza (1993–94)
- VII Promotion. Salvador de Madariaga (1994–95)
- VII Promotion. Eneko Landáburu(1995–96)
- IX Promotion. Jean Monnet (1996–97)
- X Promotion. José Antonio Pastor Ridruejo (1997–98)
- XI Promotion. Pedro Solbes (1998–99)
- XII Promotion. Antonio La Pergola (1999–2000)
- XIII Promotion. Carlos V (2000–2001)
- XIV Promotion. Santiago Ramón y Cajal (2001–2002)
- XV Promotion. Konrad Adenauer (2002–2003)
- XVI Promotion. Francisco De Goya (2003–2004)
- XVII Promotion. Miguel de Cervantes (2004–2005)
- XVIII Promotion. Robert Schuman (2005–2006)
- XIX Promotion. Marie Curie (2006–2007)
- XX Promotion. Juan Carlos I of Spain (2007–2008)
- XXI Promotion. Francisco Fernández Ordóñez (2008–2009)
- XXII Promotion. Javier Solana Madariaga (2009–2010)
- XXIII Promotion. Prince Felipe (2010–2011)
- XXIV Promotion. Jaime Caruana (2011–2012)
- XXV Promotion. Manuel Pizarro Moreno (2012–2013)
- XXVI Promotion. Mario Draghi (2013–2014)
- XXVII Promotion. Ricardo Díez-Hochleitner (2014–2015)
- XXVIII Promotion. Felipe González (2015–2016)
- XXIX Promotion. Leopoldo Calvo-Sotelo (2016–2017)
- XXX Promotion. Helmut Kohl (2017–2018)

== Awards ==
=== Silver Medal ===
The Silver Medal has been awarded to José María Aznar, Boutros Boutros-Ghali, José Manuel Barroso, Manuel Fraga, Rodrigo Rato, Pedro Solbes, Jaime Mayor Oreja, Loyola de Palacio, Javier Solana, René-Jean Dupuy and Javier Elorza, among others. Institutions may also be awarded as the Hague Academy of International Law.

=== Gold Medal ===
The Gold Medal has been awarded to Juan Carlos I, to Felipe González, and to José Manuel Barroso, President of the European Commission.
