= Abel Matutes =

Spanish politician (born 1941)

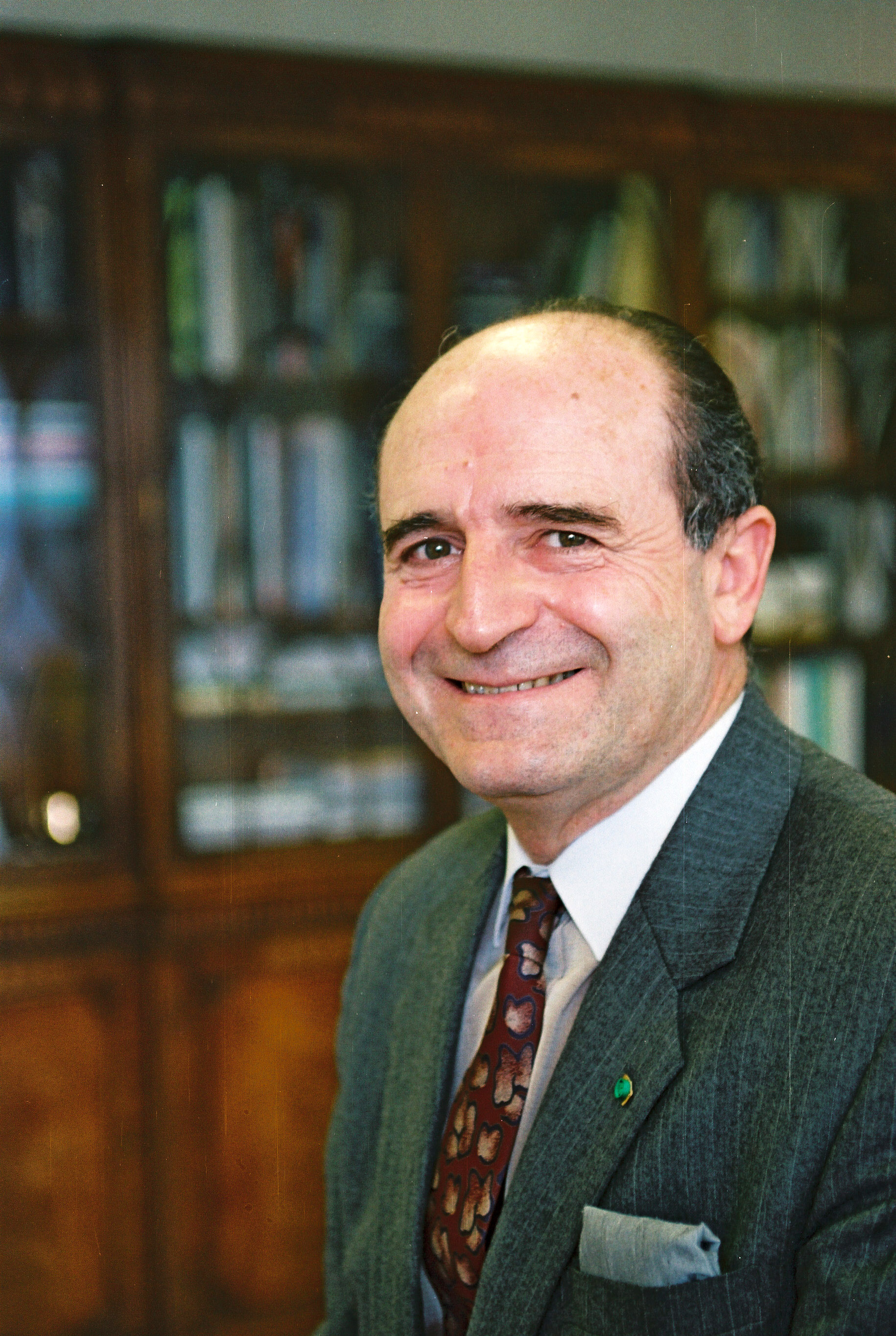
- Official portrait, 1993

Minister of Foreign Affairs
- In office 6 May 1996 – 27 April 2000
- Prime Minister: José María Aznar
- Preceded by: Carlos Westendorp
- Succeeded by: Josep Piqué

European Commissioner for Transport and Energy
- In office 1993 – April 1994
- President: Jacques Delors
- Preceded by: Karel Van Miert
- Succeeded by: Marcelino Oreja, 1st Marquess of Oreja

European Commissioner for Mediterranean and Latin American Policy
- In office 1986–1992
- President: Jacques Delors
- Preceded by: Claude Cheysson
- Succeeded by: Position abolished

Personal details
- Born: Abel Matutes y Juan; 31 October 1941 (age 84) Ibiza, Spanish State
- Party: People's Party

Abel Matutes y Juan (born 31 October 1941) is a Spanish former politician who served as Spain's Minister of Foreign Affairs from 6 May 1996 to 2000. He was also a European commissioner from 1986 to 1994 and a Member of the European Parliament.

== Early life ==
Matutes was born in Ibiza on 31 October 1941 and his early political life was in that region.

== Political service ==
He was Mayor of Ibiza in 1970 and 1971 and became Senator for Ibiza and Formentera in 1977. In 1982 Matutes left the Senate and became a member of the Congress of Deputies, the lower house of the Spanish Parliament, representing the Balearic Islands until 1985.

In 1986, Matutes became a member of the Commission of the European Community (the Delors Commission), where he was in charge of the departments of Credit and Investment, Financial Engineering and Policy for Small and Medium Enterprises, North–South relations, Mediterranean Policy, and Relations with Latin America and Asia. In 1993 his brief changed to Transportation, Energy and the Supply Agency for Euratom.

He was a Member of the European Parliament and spokesman for the People's Party at the European Parliament from 1994 onwards. As a founding leader of the Balearic branch of the Liberal Union party. He was also deputy chairman of the People's Alliance and is currently a member of the Executive Committee of the People's Party.

== Personal life ==
Outside politics Matutes is married and a father of four children. He holds a degree in Law and Economics and has been a professor of public finance, and is also a member of the Economics and Finance Academy. He is emeritus professor at the University of Santiago de Chile and of the Complutense University of Madrid a member of the Honor Committee of the Royal Institute of European Studies, an honorary member of the Filipino Academy of Spanish Language.

== See also ==
- Ushuaïa Ibiza Beach Hotel – Hotel on the island of Ibiza, Spain

Political offices
New office	Spanish European Commissioner; 1986–1994; Served alongside: Manuel Marín	Succeeded by Marcelino Oreja
Preceded by Carlos Westendorp	Minister of Foreign Affairs; 5 May 1996 –27 April 2000	Succeeded by Josep Piqué
