= European Commissioner for External Relations =

The European Commissioner for External Relations was a member of the European Commission with responsibility over the Commissions external representation in the world and the European Union's (EU) Neighbourhood Policy (ENP). The responsibility was shared though between other Commission posts (see below) and the High Representative.

The first Commissioner to hold the post was Jean Rey in 1958, who later became Commission President. The last Commissioner was Benita Ferrero-Waldner who served from 2004 to 2009 in the first Barroso Commission.

As a result of the Treaty of Lisbon, on 1 December 2009, merged the positions of Commissioner and High Representative into a composite entity called the High Representative of the Union for Foreign Affairs and Security Policy.

== List of commissioners ==
The post has been under various names (External Relations/External Affairs) and often combined with Trade or other portfolios. In the Barroso I Commission it was combined with the European Neighbourhood Policy portfolio, hence its name under that administration. Ferrero-Waldner was also the last Commissioner for External Relations as the post was taken over by the High Representative Catherine Ashton from 1 December 2009.

Commissioner	State	National party	Commission	Term start	Term end
Jean Rey	Belgium	Liberal Reformist Party	Hallstein Commission I	1958	1962
Jean Rey	Belgium	Liberal Reformist Party	Hallstein Commission II	1962	1967
Edoardo Martino	Italy	Christian Democracy	Rey Commission	1967	1970
Jean-François Deniau	France	Union for French Democracy	Malfatti Commission	1970	1972
Jean-François Deniau	France	Union for French Democracy	Mansholt Commission	1972	1973
Christopher Soames	United Kingdom	Conservative Party	Ortoli Commission	1973	1977
Wilhelm Haferkamp	West Germany	Social Democratic Party	Jenkins Commission	1977	1981
Wilhelm Haferkamp	West Germany	Social Democratic Party	Thorn Commission	1981	1985
Willy De Clercq	Belgium	Flemish Liberals and Democrats	Delors Commission I	1985	1989
Frans Andriessen	Netherlands	Christian Democratic Appeal	Delors Commission II	1989	1993
Hans van den Broek	Netherlands	Christian Democratic Appeal	Delors Commission III	1993	1995
Leon Brittan	United Kingdom	Conservative Party	Santer Commission	1995	1999
Chris Patten	United Kingdom	Conservative Party	Prodi Commission	1999	2004
Benita Ferrero-Waldner	Austria	Austrian People's Party	Barroso Commission I	2004	2009

As a result of the ratification of the Treaty of Lisbon, the Commissioner position was merged with that of the High Representative for the Common Foreign and Security Policy to become the High Representative of the Union for Foreign Affairs and Security Policy. However Ferrero-Waldner maintained control over the European Neighbourhood Policy and EuropeAid Co-operation Office (which are not part of the new High Representative's mandate).

Since the establishment of the High Representative, there are now only the following Commissioners dealing with international affairs;

- European Commissioner for Enlargement and European Neighbourhood Policy
- European Commissioner for International Cooperation, Humanitarian Aid and Crisis Response
- European Commissioner for Trade

== Related posts ==
The external relations policy of the Barroso Commission is based on three key basic propositions on the EU's role in the world. The EU is a global player; it pursues a specific foreign policy philosophy which one could term "effective multilateralism"; and, thanks to its specific nature, the EU disposes of a wide range of foreign policy instruments which are particularly suited to respond to today's challenges. In his first Commission, President Barroso established a Group of Commissioners, chaired by him, and in charge of six external relations services. Prior to its abolition, there were four external relations posts;

- Benita Ferrero-Waldner was deputy chair of the Group of External Relations Commissioners, and responsible for External Relations and European Neighbourhood Policy. She was responsible for two Commission Directorate-Generals: External Relations (Relex) and the EuropeAid Co-operation Office (Aidco).
- Catherine Ashton was responsible for External Trade. The Directorate General for Trade of the European Commission is in charge of implementing the external trade policy of the European Union. International trade is forefront of international relations.
- Louis Michel was responsible for Humanitarian Aid and Development Policy. A closely related goal is enhancing the effectiveness of the Union's development assistance. He was responsible for two Directorate-Generals: the European Commission Humanitarian Aid Office (ECHO) and Development.
- Olli Rehn was responsible for Enlargement. This has been the key tool in enhancing the European model and meeting the objectives of foreign and security policy. The Enlargement Directorate General managed the process under his responsibility.

== See also ==
- Directorate-General for External Relations
- Common Foreign and Security Policy
- Foreign relations of the European Union
