= European Commissioner for Health and Animal Welfare =

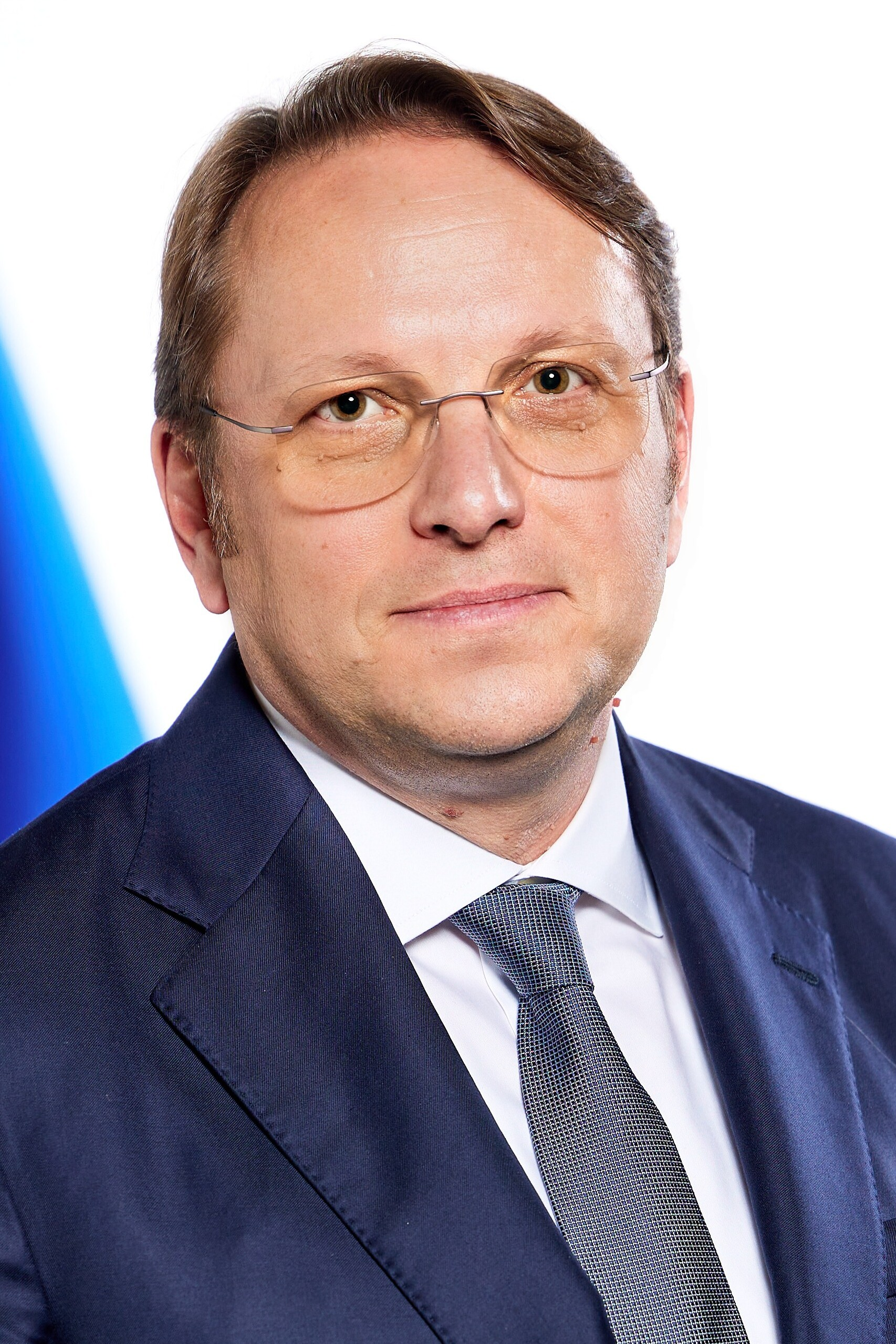
- Incumbent; Olivér Várhelyi since 1 December 2024
- Appointer: President of the European Commission
- Precursor: European Commissioner for Health and Food Safety
- Inaugural holder: Richard Burke
- Formation: 1977

The European Commissioner for Health and Animal Welfare is a member of the European Commission. The current Commissioner is Olivér Várhelyi. The portfolio is responsible for matters of public health and animal welfare.

== Portfolio ==
Markos Kyprianou was appointed to the Barroso Commission as European Commissioner for Health & Consumer Protection; however, with the accession of Bulgaria on 1 January 2007, the Consumer Protect portfolio was split off and given to Meglena Kuneva (See: European Commissioner for Consumer Protection). The post's Directorate-General is still merged with that office.

One policy is the promotion of warnings on tobacco packets, with the Commission moving towards pictorial warnings. Following several European Union member states enacting bans on smoking in public places Kyprianou proposed a plan for an EU-wide ban of that kind.

In May 2007, Kyprianou released a paper to tackle the shortage of organ donation in the Union. The plan included promotion, specially trained medical staff and an EU wide organ donor card. After Kyprianou was appointed Foreign Minister of Cyprus, he was replaced by Androulla Vasiliou on 3 March 2008.

== List of commissioners ==
| # | Name | Country | Period | Commission |
|---|---|---|---|---|
| 1 | Richard Burke | Ireland | 1977–1981 | Jenkins |
| 2 | Karl-Heinz Narjes | West Germany | 1981–1985 | Thorn |
| 3 | Stanley Clinton Davis | United Kingdom | 1985–1988 | Delors I |
| 4 | Grigoris Varfis | Greece | 1985–1989 | Delors I |
| 5 | Karel Van Miert | Belgium | 1989–1992 | Delors II |
| 6 | Christiane Scrivener | France | 1992–1994 | Delors II |
| 7 | Emma Bonino | Italy | 1995–1999 | Santer |
| 8 | David Byrne | Ireland | 1999–2004 | Prodi |
| 9 | Pavel Telička | Czech Republic | 2004 | Prodi (Parallel to Byrne) |
| 10 | Markos Kyprianou | Cyprus | 2004–2010 | Barroso I (Health only) |
| 11 | Androulla Vassiliou | Cyprus | 2008–2010 | Barroso I (Health only) |
| 12 | John Dalli | Malta | 2010–16 October 2012 | Barroso II |
| 13 | Maroš Šefčovič | Slovakia | 2012 | Barroso II (Acting) |
| 14 | Tonio Borg | Malta | 2012–2014 | Barroso II (Health only from 2013) |
| 15 | Neven Mimica | Croatia | 2013–2014 | Barroso II (Consumer protection only) |
| 16 | Vytenis Andriukaitis | Lithuania | 2014–2019 | Juncker |
| 17 | Stella Kyriakidou | Cyprus | 2019–2024 | von der Leyen I |
| 18 | Olivér Várhelyi | Hungary | 2024–present | von der Leyen II |

== See also ==
- Directorate-General for Health and Food Safety
- European Agency for Safety and Health at Work
