= European commissioner =

Member of the European Commission, holder of a specific portfolio

A European commissioner is a member of the 27-member European Commission, the executive cabinet of the European Union. Their role is broadly equivalent to ministers at the national level, with each holding responsibility for a specific Directorate-General or group of them. The commission is led by the president of the European Commission, who serves as head of government for the European Union.

== Appointment ==
Commissioners are nominated by member states in consultation with the commission president, who then selects a team of commissioners. This team of nominees are then subject to hearings at the European Parliament, which questions them and then votes on their suitability as a whole. If members of the team are found to be inappropriate, the president must then reshuffle the team or request a new candidate from the member state or risk the whole commission being voted down. As parliament cannot vote against individual commissioners there is usually a compromise whereby the worst candidates are removed but minor objections are put aside, or dealt with by adjusting portfolios, so the commission can take office. Once the team is approved by the parliament, it is formally put into office by the European Council (TEU Article 17:7).

Although members of the commission are allocated between member states, they do not represent their states. Instead, they are supposed to act in European interests. Normally, a member state will nominate someone of the same political party as that which forms the current government. There are exceptions, such as Member of the Commission Richard Burke (of Fine Gael), who was nominated by Taoiseach Charles Haughey (of Fianna Fáil). In the past, when the larger states had two seats, they often went to the two major parties, such as in the United Kingdom.

Twelve of the current 27 members are women. The first female commissioners were Christiane Scrivener and Vasso Papandreou in the 1989 Delors Commission. Peter Mandelson (2004 to October 2008) was the first openly gay commissioner.

European Parliament president Jerzy Buzek proposed in 2010 that commissioners be directly elected, by member states placing their candidate at the top of their voting lists in European elections. That would give them individually, and the body as a whole, a democratic mandate.

=== Oath ===
Each member is required to take an oath before the Court of Justice of the European Union, officially the Solemn Declaration before the Court of Justice of the European Union. The Charter of Fundamental Rights gained legal force on 1 December 2009. Justice Commissioner Viviane Reding subsequently proposed that commissioners should swear to uphold it also. The second Barroso Commission went to the Court of Justice on 3 May 2010 for the first such oath alongside their usual oath. The oath taken by the members of the Barroso Commission was:

Having been appointed as a Member of the European Commission by the European Council, following the vote of consent by the European Parliament I solemnly undertake: to respect the Treaties and the Charter of Fundamental Rights of the European Union in the fulfilment of all my duties; to be completely independent in carrying out my responsibilities, in the general interest of the Union; in the performance of my tasks, neither to seek nor to take instructions from any Government or from any other institution, body, office or entity; to refrain from any action incompatible with my duties or the performance of my tasks. I formally note the undertaking of each Member State to respect this principle and not to seek to influence Members of the Commission in the performance of their tasks. I further undertake to respect, both during and after my term of office, the obligation arising therefrom, and in particular the duty to behave with integrity and discretion as regards the acceptance, after I have ceased to hold office, of certain appointments or benefits.

== History ==
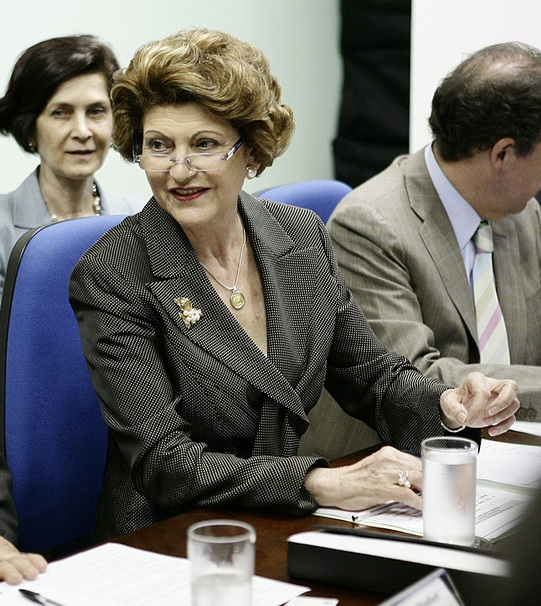
Former European Commissioner for Education, Culture, Multilingualism and Youth, Androulla Vassiliou

Until 2004, the larger member states (Spain upwards) nominated two commissioners and the smaller states nominated one. As the size of the body was increasing with enlargement, the larger states lost their second commissioner after the 2004 enlargement with the new Barroso Commission being appointed under the Treaty of Nice.

Nice also specified that once the number of members reached 27 then the number of commissioners should be reduced to "less than the number of Member States". The exact number of commissioners would have to be decided by a unanimous vote of the European Council and membership would rotate equally between member states. Following the accession of Romania and Bulgaria in January 2007, this clause took effect for the following commission (appointed after the 2009 European elections).

The failed European Constitution first mandated that the number of commissioners should equal two-thirds of the member states. This could be changed by a vote in the European Council, in case the number was still too high in the future. The constitution failed ratification but this change was brought in with the Treaty of Lisbon. However, as Lisbon was being ratified the Irish electorate voted against it with one reason being the fear of losing a commissioner. The Irish then voted again, in favour of the treaty on a number of conditions; one being that they kept their commissioner.

In 2009, in what was known as the 26+1 formula, it was proposed that (in order to comply with the Nice Treaty provision that there should be fewer commissioners than members) instead of a commissioner one member state should fill the post of high representative. An idea floated in 2007 was the creation of junior members for smaller states. In 2004, there was a proposal to create a "super-commissioner" who would be vice president of the Commission and would "be able to intervene in all decisions concerning EU projects that have an impact" on the economic performance of the EU.

Another change Lisbon brought, as hinted above, was the creation of the role of High Representative of the Union for Foreign Affairs and Security Policy by merging the post of European Commissioner for External Relations with the council's High Representative for the Common Foreign and Security Policy. The new more powerful high representative became ex-officio Vice-President of the Commission and would chair the Council of the European Union when foreign ministers were meeting.

== Accountability ==
In addition to its role in approving a new Commission, the European Parliament has the power at any time to force the entire Commission to resign through a vote of no confidence. This requires a vote that makes up at least two-thirds of those voting and a majority of the total membership of the Parliament. While it has never used this power, it threatened to use it against the Commission headed by Jacques Santer in 1999 over allegations of corruption. In response, the Santer Commission resigned en masse of its own accord, the only time a Commission has done so.

== Salaries ==
A commissioner's basic monthly salary is fixed at 112.5% of the top civil service grade. As of June 2023, this works out to be €25,910.19 per month. The president is paid at 138% (€27,436.90 per month), vice-presidents at 125% (€24,852.26 per month) and the High Representative at 130% (€25,846.35 per month). There are further allowances on top of these figures, including household allowance, child allowance, and a substantial expatriation allowance (where applicable).

== Portfolios ==
The make-up and distribution of portfolios are determined by the Commission president and do not always correspond with the commission's departments (directorates-general). While some have been fairly consistent in make-up between each Commission, some have only just been created or are paired with others. With a record number of members in 2007, the portfolios have become very thin even though the responsibilities of the commission have increased.

== Civil service ==
A commissioner can come under a great deal of influence from the staff under their control. The European Civil Service is permanent whereas a commissioner is in office usually for just five years. Hence it is the service which knows the workings of the commission and have longer term interests. Strong leadership from a commissioner, who knows the workings of their portfolio, can overcome the power of the service. An example would be Pascal Lamy; however, the best people are usually kept by their national governments, leading to less solid candidates getting the job.

== Politicisation ==
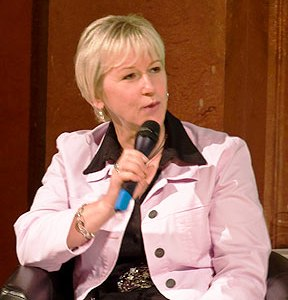
Margot Wallström has said that the EU has to get more political and controversial.

Commissioners are required to remain above national politics while exercising their duties in the Commission, but are normally involved in their European-level political party. However, the requirement to keep out of national politics has slowly been eroded. During the Prodi Commission, Anna Diamantopoulou (Employment and Social Affairs) took leave from the commission to participate in the 2004 Greek elections and resigned when she won a seat despite her party losing. Romano Prodi campaigned in the 2001 Italian elections while still president.

Louis Michel (Development & Humanitarian Aid) announced that he would go on unpaid leave to take part in the 2007 Belgian elections. Although he positioned himself so as not to be elected, the European Parliament's development committee asked the Parliament's legal service to assess if his participation violated the treaties. Michel claimed that politicisation of this manner is part of reconnecting the Union with its citizens. The Commission revised its code of conduct for commissioners allowing them to "be active members of political parties or trade unions". To participate in an election campaign they are required to "withdraw from the work of the Commission for the duration of the campaign".

This does throw their independence in doubt, where a politician leaves their national scene for one or two terms and returns to it for a new job. Most in essence owe their positions to nomination and support from national party leaders and parties they have been aligned to; usually seeking to return to the party-political fray.

Politicisation has even gone so far as commissioners backing national candidates, with Neelie Kroes (Competition) backing Angela Merkel in the 2005 German elections and Margot Wallström (Institutional Relations & Communication Strategy) backing Ségolène Royal in the 2007 French elections. Wallström defended this, claiming that the EU has to get more political and controversial as being a vital role in communicating the commission. Wallström has been notable for engaging in debate and politics: she was the first commissioner to start her own blog.

However their political nature can also cause problems in their habit of leaving the job early in the final years of the commission to take up new national posts. In seeking to secure their post-Commission job, they can undermine the work of the commission. Following elections in Cyprus, Commissioner Kyprianou left to become Cypriot Foreign Minister. Likewise, Commissioner Frattini left to do the same following elections in Italy. During the previous Prodi Commission, Pedro Solbes left to become the Spanish finance minister, Michel Barnier left to become French foreign minister, Erkki Liikanen left to become head of the Bank of Finland and Anna Diamantopoulou also resigned early. Even President Prodi started campaigning in the Italian elections before his term as head of the commission was over.

Appointment to the commission has the effect of removing a political figure from a country for a period of years, and this has been compared to the ancient Athenian practice of ostracism.

Thierry Breton resigned as European Commissioner on 16 September 2024, accusing Ursula von der Leyen of undermining him and disrupting the EU's power transition.

== See also ==
- List of European Commissioners by nationality
- Vice-President of the European Commission
- Von der Leyen Commission II
