= Yves-Thibault de Silguy =

French politician

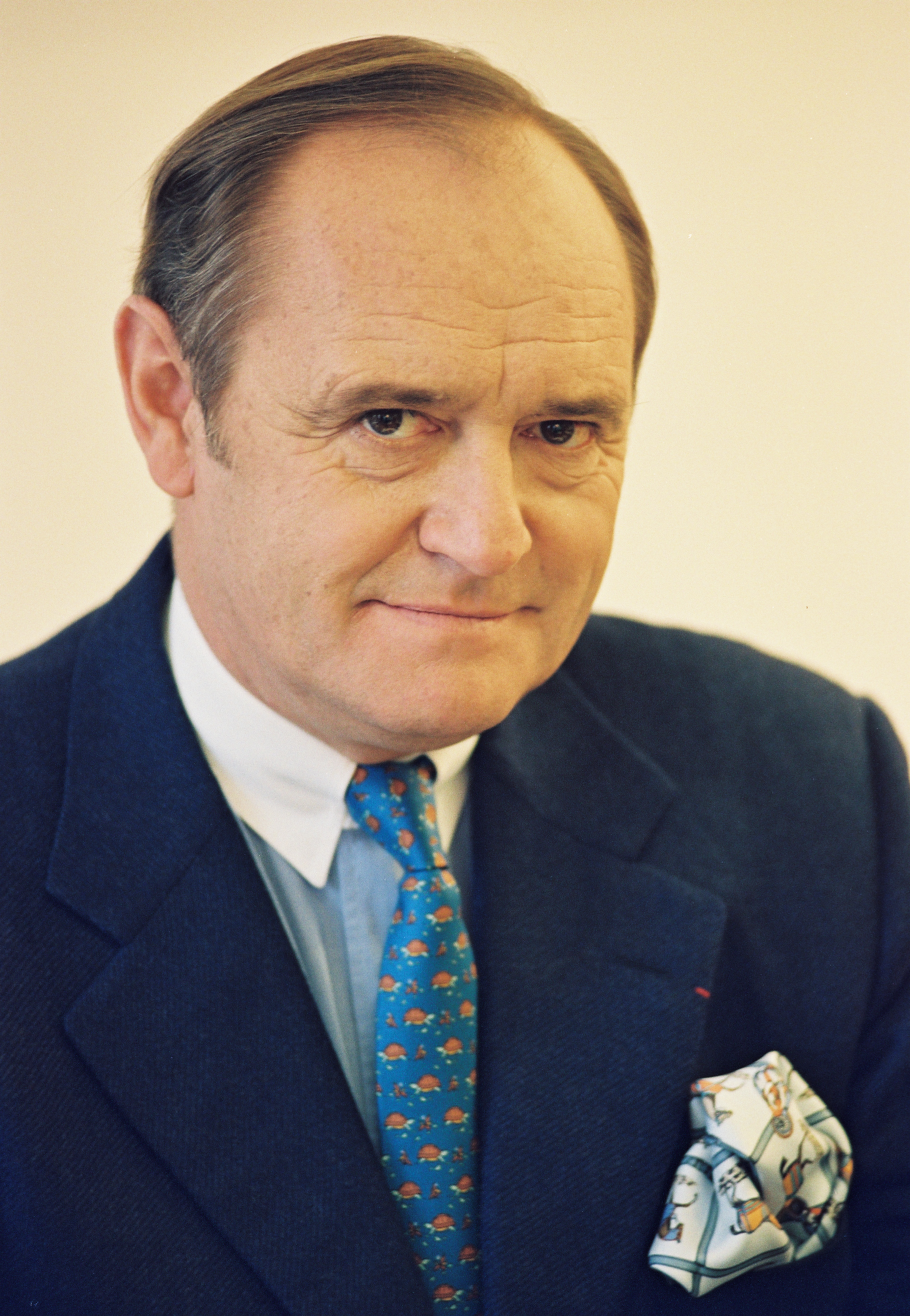
- De Silguy in 1997

European Commissioner for Economic and Financial Affairs
- In office 23 January 1995 – 15 September 1999
- President: Jacques Santer
- Preceded by: Henning Christophersen
- Succeeded by: Pedro Solbes

Personal details
- Born: 22 July 1948 (age 78) Rennes, France
- Education: University of Rennes; Sciences Po, ÉNA

Yves-Thibault de Silguy (French pronunciation: [iv tibo də silɡi]; born 22 July 1948) is a French and European politician. He served in the Santer Commission and was in charge of Economic and Financial Affairs. He was a member of the Club de l'horloge.

== Political career ==
Before moving to the European Commission in 1995, de Silguy was chief adviser on European Union affairs to Prime Minister Édouard Balladur from 1993 to 1995. During his time as Commissioner, he managed the introduction of the Euro.

Following the resignation of the Santer Commission, France did not renominate de Silguy.

== Later career ==
In 2000, de Silguy became a member of the Executive Board of Suez Lyonnaise des Eaux and later was Chief Executive Officer of Suez from 2001 to 2003. He was then Executive Vice-President of Suez from 2003 until June 2006.

== Other activities ==
=== Corporate boards ===
- VTB Bank, Independent Member of the Supervisory Council (since 2013)
- Autoroutes du Sud de la France (ASF), Member of the Board of Directors
- Solvay, Member of the Board of Directors (since 2011)
- Sofisport, Chairman of Supervisory Council
- LVMH, Independent Member of the Board of Directors (since 2009)
- Vinci SA, Vice Chairman of the Board of Directors (since 2006), Chairman of the Board of Directors (2006–2010)

=== Non-profit organizations ===
- MEDEF International, Vice-Chairman
