= Santer Commission =

European Commission between 23 January 1995 and 15 March 1999

- 2nd Commission of the European Union

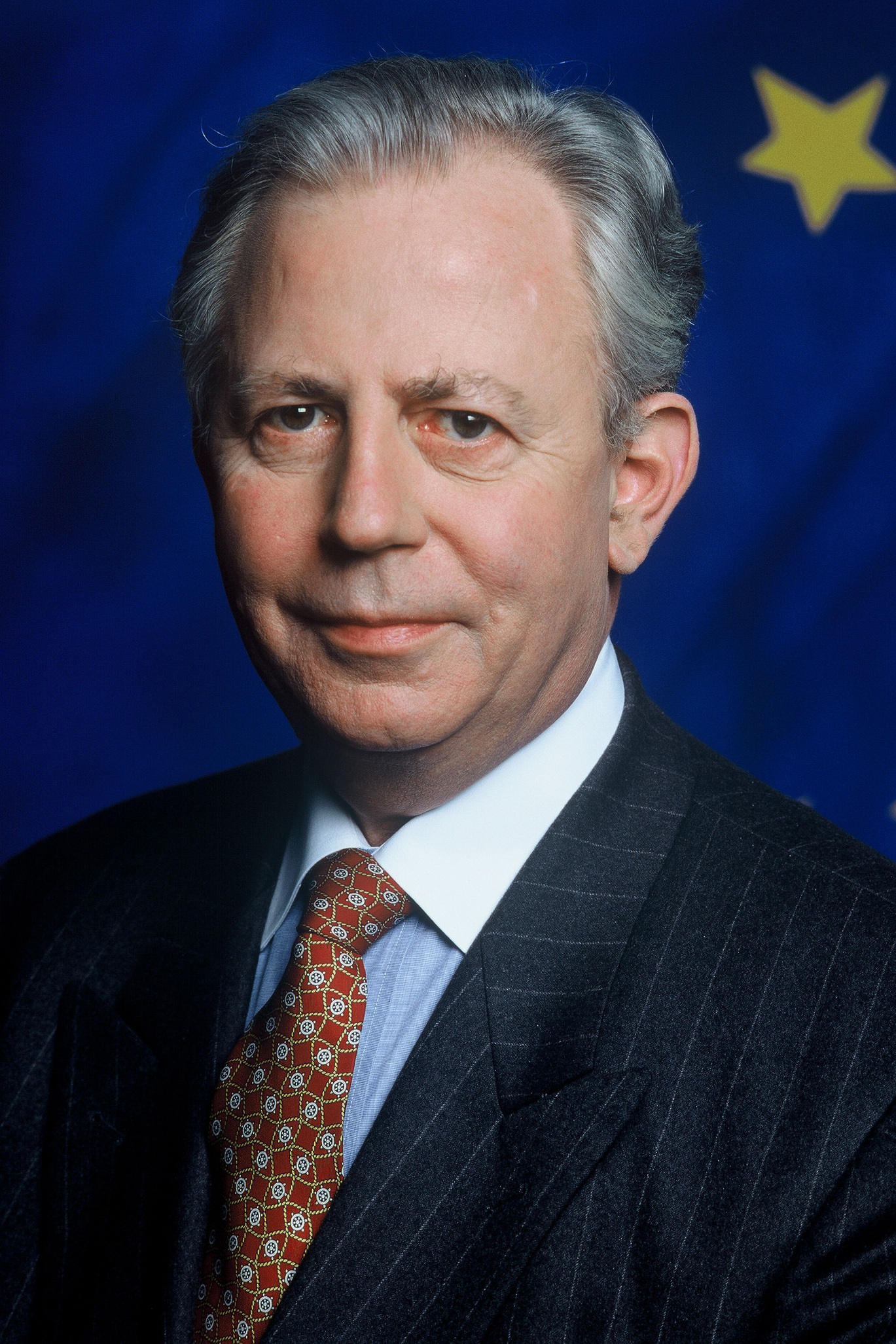
- Date formed: 23 January 1995
- Date dissolved: 15 March 1999

History
- Election(s): 1994 European Parliament election
- Predecessor: Delors Commission
- Successor: Prodi Commission

The Santer Commission was the European Commission in office between 23 January 1995 and 15 March 1999. The administration was led by Jacques Santer (former Prime Minister of Luxembourg).

The body had 20 members and oversaw the introduction of the euro. It was cut short when the Commission became the first to resign en masse, owing to allegations of corruption. Some members continued under Manuel Marín until the Prodi Commission was appointed.

== Appointment ==
In 1994, Jacques Delors was due to step down from a successful tenure as President of the European Commission. However, his federalist style was not to the liking of many national governments. Hence, when Jean-Luc Dehaene (the then Prime Minister of Belgium) was nominated as his successor, he was vetoed by the UK on the grounds he was too federalist. Jacques Santer, then-Prime Minister of Luxembourg, was seen as less federalist, for his presidency had earlier proposed the pillar structure. Hence, he was nominated and approved by the European Council on 15 July 1994.

Being seen as the "second choice" weakened Santer's position, with the European Parliament approving him only by a narrow majority. He himself admitted that he "was not the first choice – but to become Commission president was not my first choice either." He did, however, flex his powers over the nominations for the other Commissioners. The President gained this power under the Maastricht Treaty that came into force the previous year. On 18 January 1995, he got his Commission approved by Parliament by 416 votes to 103 (a larger majority than expected) and they were appointed by the council on 23 January.

== Early work ==
The Santer Commission oversaw the development of the Treaty of Nice before it was signed in 2000, negotiations with those countries to join in 2004 and the signing of the Amsterdam Treaty in 1997.

Notably it contributed to the development of the euro and issued a series of green papers based on Commissioner Yves-Thibault de Silguy's work. The commission also developed the euro currency symbol. The euro was established on 1999-01-01. The commission also continued Delors's social agenda, pushed for more powers in that field including tackling unemployment and began proposals for the reform of the Common Agricultural Policy.

Santer, desiring a quotable slogan for his administration, stated his Commissions aim would be "to do less, but do it better" (a slogan adopted and adapted by many since). Although just a sound bite, it struck a chord for some thinking the Community needed a rest after the new treaties and the euro, even if the nature of the Community itself requires movements and new projects to keep it busy. However, during 1998 the commission began to lose authority due to management criticisms from the Parliament.

== Budget controversy ==
The community's budget for each year needs to be discharged by the Parliament following its report by the European Court of Auditors. It had only refused to do so once previously, in 1984. Towards the end of 1998 the Parliament's Committee on Budgetary Control initially refused to discharge the community's budget for 1996 over what it saw as the arrogance of the Commission in its refusal to answer questions relating to financial mismanagement. Paul van Buitenen, a whistle-blower working in the commission, had sent the Parliament a report alleging widespread fraud and cover ups, stating: "I found strong indications that . . . auditors have been hindered in their investigations and that officials received instructions to obstruct the audit examinations . . . The commission is a closed culture and they want to keep it that way, and my objective is to open it up, to create more transparency and to put power where it belongs – and that's in the democratically-elected European Parliament." In response, the Commission suspended him on half pay for releasing details of an inquiry.

However it eventually supported the discharge 14 to 13 on 11 December, recommending that the plenary support the discharge. It was taken to plenary for debate four days later however the assigned rapporteur publicly went against the committee's official position and urged the plenary to reject the discharge motion. President Santer announced that the commission would treat the vote of discharge as one of confidence. In a vote on 17 December 1998, the Parliament denied the discharge.

In response, on the basis it was tantamount to a vote of no confidence, the President of the intra-national Party of European Socialists (PES), Pauline Green, announced she would put forward a motion of censure. However the PES would vote against its own motion, as there is no method for a motion of confidence. During this period, the Parliament took on an increased government-opposition dynamic, with the PES as a party supporting the commission and the intra-national European People's Party (EPP) renouncing its support and acting as a de facto opposition party to the executive. This was in part because the allegations centred on Édith Cresson and Manuel Marín, both from the Socialist party (PES). It was seen by some that it was an attempt by the EPP to discredit the PES ahead of the 1999 elections. This led to hesitation from the PES leadership, who were the largest group in Parliament, to support the allegations. Motions tabled by the two groups outlined the differing stances the EPP favouring individual responsibility (only censuring those who the main allegations were against) and the PES favouring an emphasis on collective responsibility (so EPP members such as the President, as well as PES members, would be forced to resign). The PES resolution also proposed establishing a committee of independent experts to investigate the allegations.

== Resignation ==
Following negotiations, including national governments pressuring their MEPs, the Parliament met to vote on the resolutions on 14 January 1999. It accepted the PES resolution and turned down a censure motion 293 to 232. A Committee of Independent Experts was set up with its members appointed by the political leaders in Parliament and the commission. A number of high-profile figures were appointed and President Santer agreed to "respond" to its findings. The report was produced on 15 March 1999 and was presented to the Commission and Parliament. It largely cleared most members, aside from Cresson, but concluded that there was growing reluctance of the Commissioners to acknowledge responsibility and that "It was becoming increasingly difficult to find anyone who had the slightest sense of responsibility."

The entire Santer Commission resigned in response to the report

In response to the report, the PES withdrew their support from the Commission and joined the other groups stating that unless the Commission resigned of its own accord, it would be forced to do so. So, on the night of 15 March, Santer announced the mass resignation of his Commission. The morning following the resignation, against the recommendation of his advisors, Santer attacked the conclusions of Committee. The report was seen to be even in criticising not only PES members but also the workings of the Commission itself. It also exposed the situation that neither Parliament, nor the President, could force the resignation of individual Commissioners as they could only be 'recalled' by national governments. The French government refused to recall Cresson, who refused to resign of her own accord, which sparked the need for a mass resignation. Commissioner Mario Monti criticised this, stating that "This Commission has collectively resigned, I believe, not because of collective responsibility but because certain members of it preferred not to take their own individual responsibilities." Édith Cresson went before the European Court of Justice and, in July 2006, was found guilty but was not stripped of her pension. Cresson today is largely held accountable for the fall of Santer (who went on to serve as an MEP and never fully recovered), and the rest of his Commission.

== Repercussions ==
The immediate effect was that the politically weakened Commission was unable to react to the beginning of the Kosovo War and the close of the Agenda 2000 negotiations. The crisis had compounded the already reduced powers of the Commission in favour of the Parliament's legislative power, the council's foreign policy role and the ECB's financial role. However the change with Parliament was the most profound, the previous permanent cooperation between the two bodies came to an end with the shift in power.

It was hoped by the leaders in Parliament that such a political challenge would generate useful publicity ahead of the elections, with previous polls producing a low turn out with a perception of the body being powerless. In this respect the affair did generate extensive media attention with the Parliament now seeming 'dramatic'. The committee report also was written in an unusually accessible manner, filled with soundbites. Further more it also drew greater attention from the council to a Parliament willing to exercise its powers. Hence when the Council came in to agree on a new president, it was clear that the candidate had to be acceptable to parliament. The crisis also displayed the increasing party competition within the Parliament, leading to the development of a Parliamentary system between the executive and legislative branches. Indeed, it can be seen that the government-opposition dynamic of the two main parties in Parliament aggravated the development of the crisis and contributed to the downfall of the commission.

The Prodi Commission, which succeeded Marín's caretaker administration, announced a zero-tolerance approach to fraud. Following pressure from Parliament, the Commission quickly established OLAF, an anti-fraud office which replaced the Unit for the Co-ordination of Fraud Protection (UCLAF) established in 1988 and seen as having failed in its duty. OLAF was established with more powers and to be more independent, especially in terms of investigation where they are formally autonomous from the commission. There were a few members who survived the Santer Commission to continue under Prodi: Franz Fischler, Erkki Liikanen, Mario Monti and Neil Kinnock. The latter was appointed to undertake institutional reform.

The reappointment of some of these members showed that individual Commissioners still maintained their own reputations despite the massive loss of face of the institution as a whole, while Cresson would have never been able to have been reappointed. The Commission itself suffered from a loss of trust and reputation, only compounded by the post-Delors mood. Prodi had to deal with increased euroscepticism which helped bring down the Santer Commission. Since the end of the Delors era, pro-integrationism had given way with greater concern about the commission's powers. By just 2000 the Council curbed the commission's powers once more when they believed Prodi overstepped his remit.

== College ==
The Commission college had 20 members (two for the largest five member states, one each for the remainder) and included Commissioners from new member states Sweden, Finland and Austria. Had Norway not rejected EU membership in 1995, their Commissioner would have been Thorvald Stoltenberg who was proposed as Commissioner for Fisheries.

Portfolio(s)	Commissioner	State	Party
President; Secretariat-General, Legal Service, Security Office, Forward Studies Unit, Inspectorate General, Joint Interpreting and Conference Service (SCIC), Spokesman's Service, Monetary Matters (with de Silguy), CFSP (with van den Broek) and Institutional Questions for the 1996 IGC (with Oreja)	Jacques Santer	Luxembourg	CSV; EPP
Vice-President; Commercial Policy and External Relations with North America, Australasia, East Asia, the OECD and WTO	Leon Brittan	United Kingdom	Con. ED
Vice-President; External Relations with the Southern Mediterranean, Latin America and the Middle East	Manuel Marin	Spain	PSOE; PES
Internal Market, Services Customs and Taxation	Mario Monti	Italy	Independent
Agriculture & Rural Development	Franz Fischler	Austria	ÖVP; EPP
Competition	Karel Van Miert	Belgium	SP; PES
Economic & Financial Affairs; Inc. Credit and Investments, the Statistical Office and Monetary Matters (with the President)	Yves-Thibault de Silguy	France	Independent
Employment & Social Affairs and relations with the EESC	Pádraig Flynn	(Republic of Ireland); Ireland	FF; AEN
Consumer Policy, Fisheries and ECHO	Emma Bonino	Italy	TRP; ELDR
Environment and nuclear security	Ritt Bjerregaard	Denmark	SD; PES
Industrial affairs, Information & Telecommunications Technologies	Martin Bangemann	Germany	FDP; ELDR
Transport, including TEN	Neil Kinnock	United Kingdom	Labour; PES
Energy, Euratom Supply Agency, SMEs and Tourism	Christos Papoutsis	Greece	PASOK; PES
Immigration, Justice & Home Affairs, Financial Control, Anti-fraud and Relations with the European Ombudsman.	Anita Gradin	Sweden	SDWP; PES
Budget, Personnel and Administration	Erkki Liikanen	Finland	SDP; PES
Regional Policy; Inc. Cohesion Fund (with Kinnock & Bjerregaard) and relations with the Committee of the Regions	Monika Wulf-Mathies	Germany	SPD; PES
Research, Science & Technology; Joint Research Centre, Human Resources, Education, Training and Youth	Édith Cresson	France	PS; PES
Relations with central and eastern Europe, CFSP and the External Service	Hans van den Broek	Netherlands	CDA; EPP
Relations with African, Caribbean, Pacific Countries, South Africa and the Lomé Convention	João de Deus Pinheiro	Portugal	PSD; EPP
Relations with the European Parliament, Culture, Audiovisual Policy, Relations with the European Parliament, Communication, Information, Openness, Publications Office and Institutional Questions for the 1996 IGC (with the President)	Marcelino Oreja	Spain	PP; EPP

== See also ==
- History of the European Union (1993-1999)
- Breydel building
