= Delors Commission =

1st Commission of the European Union

Delors Commissions
- 1st Commission of the European Union

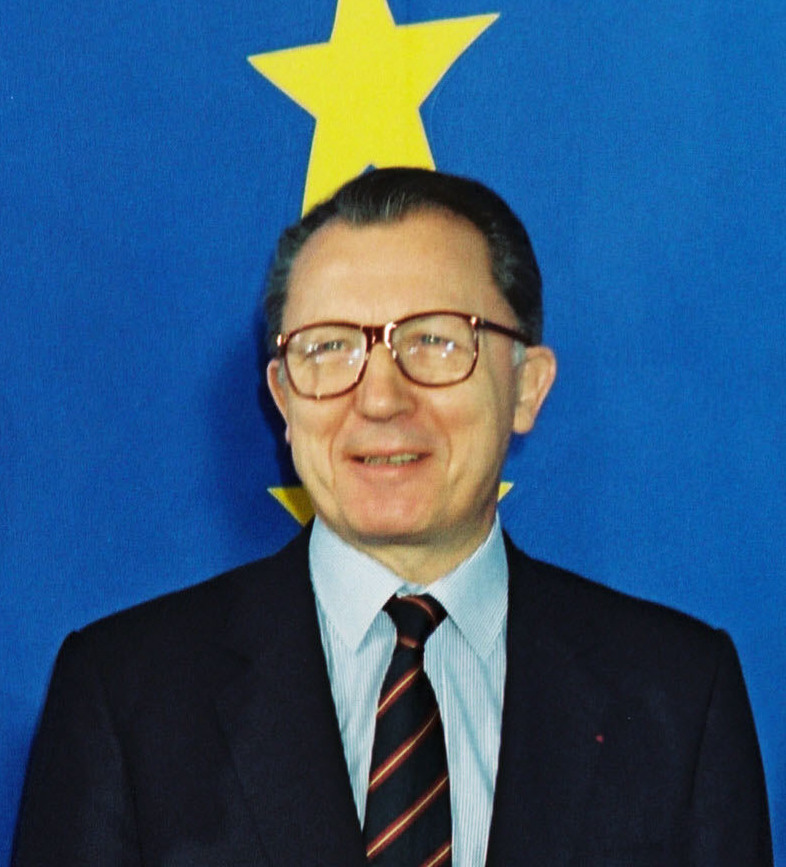
- Date formed: 5 January 1985
- Date dissolved: 23 January 1995

People and organisations
- President of the Commission: Jacques Delors

History
- Predecessor: Thorn Commission
- Successor: Santer Commission

The Delors Commission was the administration of Jacques Delors, the eighth President of the European Commission. Delors presided over the European Commission for three terms (though the last one lasted for around a year). The first term lasted from 1985 to 1988, the second until 1992 and the final one until 1994, making Delors the longest serving president, and his Commission is also seen as the most successful at advancing European integration. It was the only Commission to serve three times, and Delors served five two-year terms (as they were then). The third Commission was the first Commission of the European Union, the Maastricht Treaty having come into force in 1993.

== History ==
The European Commissions led by Jacques Delors are regarded by some as the most successful in the European Union's history at advancing integration. Delors himself became an icon of Euro-federalists and widely disliked by Eurosceptics, especially in Britain.

=== Entrance ===
The first Delors Commission

Delors entered office when eurosclerosis was at its height. The slow pace of enlargement, lack of democracy and economic problems caused that negative and apathetic attitudes to the Community were high. The preceding Thorn Commission was unable to exercise its authority to any meaningful extent in the face of the British vetoes on EU projects to force a more favourable agreement for it on the Community budget. Delors had previously been one of the architects of the agreement at Fontainebleau, which secured the UK rebate, and Delors intended that the settling of the budget issue should herald a new era of European integration.

Following Delors' arrival in Brussels, he visited the various member states and found the same complaint that Europe reacted too slowly to issues, but did find common agreement on the single market, with its business and cultural meaning, and hence Delors placed it as his main priority with a date for its achievement: 1992 (Objectif 1992). Despite his modern reputation he was criticised by federalists for not going far enough, even earning criticism from Altiero Spinelli in the European Parliament, but Delors defended his goals as pragmatic stating "we are all slaves to the circumstances". To accomplish his goal of completing the single market, Delors had to master the political system of the community: with any member able to block a proposal in the Council, Delors convinced leaders to introduce Qualified Majority Voting so the procedure could not grind to a halt as it did under the budget disagreement. Thus, Delors set Lord Cockfield, his Internal Market Commissioner, in drafting the legislation. Now, Cockfield's work is seen as highly precise and his knowledge of the system legendary.

=== Achievements ===
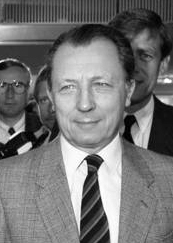
President Delors in 1988

The Delors Commission gave a new momentum to the process of European integration. They 'completed' the internal market and laid the foundations for the single European currency. European Economic and Monetary Union was based on the three stage plan drawn up by a committee headed by Delors (the Delors Report). Delors and his Commissioners are considered the "founding fathers" of the euro. The groundwork and political persuasion was achieved through the work of the Commissioners leading to the signature of the Single European Act (SEA) in February 1986 and the Treaty of Maastricht in 1992.

The Delors Commission was also responsible for the creation of the Committee of the Regions, having enshrined the idea of cohesion between EU states and regions in the SEA in 1986 leading Delors to propose the body in 1992. It was created in 1994 and the building the body occupies was named after Delors in 2006. Delors' Commission oversaw a large degree of expansion. The membership of Spain and Portugal came first in 1985; then the fall of the Berlin Wall enabled the Reunification of Germany; and in 1995 came the accession of Austria, Finland and Sweden. The Delors Commission also prepared the opening to the eastern countries who later joined in 2004.

In 1988 Delors addressed the British Trades Union Congress; his speech about a social Europe was pivotal in turning British Labour pro-European and the British Conservatives against it. In 1992, as Delors' second term was coming to an end, the International Herald Tribune noted the effect of the Delors Commission, and the need for a third term;

Mr. Delors rescued the European Community from the doldrums. He arrived when Europessimism was at its worst. Although he was a little-known former French finance minister, he breathed life and hope into the EC and into the dispirited Brussels Commission. In his first term, from 1985 to 1988, he rallied Europe to the call of the single market, and when appointed to a second term he began urging Europeans toward the far more ambitious goals of economic, monetary and political union.

Following his entrance into a Europe of eurosclerosis, Delors had heralded 20 years of euphoria. In contrast, the Santer Commission which succeeded Delors in 1995 was forced to resign over allegations of corruption and the Prodi Commission won little praise despite presiding over the 2004 enlargement and the implementation of the single currency.

In opposition to the strident neoliberalism of U.S. president Ronald Reagan (serv. 1981–1989) which dominated the American political agenda, Delors and his Commission promoted an alternative interpretation of capitalism that embedded it in the European social structure. He synthesized three themes. From the left came favouring the redistribution of wealth, and the protection of the weakest. Second, a neomercantilist approach wanted to maximize European industrial output. A third was reliance on the marketplace. His emphasis on the social nature of Europe is central to an important exceptionalism narrative that became central to the self identification of the European Union.

=== Major events ===
The Second Delors Commission

The commission was the longest serving executive to date and oversaw many events in the history of the Union.

- 1985: Greenland leaves the Community. Gravier ruling by the ECJ on non-discrimination by nationality.
- 1986: Spain and Portugal join the Communities. The Single European Act is signed. Marshall ruling by the ECJ on non-discrimination by gender. The European flag is adopted by the Communities, it is raised outside the Berlaymont.
- 1987: 30 years since the Treaties of Rome. Membership application submitted by Turkey. Single European Act enters into force.
- 1988: Delors asked to draw up a report on Economic and Monetary Union (the Delors Report). The Court of First Instance is established. The Delors Package I was adopted, increasing the budget (notably for structural policy) and reforming the budgetary procedure.
- 1989: Cowan ruling by the ECJ on non-discrimination by nationality. Delors Report presented. Declaration of Fundamental Rights and Freedoms adopted by the Parliament. Third direct elections to Parliament held. Spain and Portugal join the European Monetary System. Berlin Wall falls, leading to agreements and accession of eastern countries. Lomé Convention signed. First European Union Merger law adopted.
- 1990: Commission meets for 1000th time. European Bank for Reconstruction and Development established. Schengen agreement signed. Reunification of Germany.
- 1991: Stoeckel ruling by the ECJ on non-discrimination by gender. ECHO established. Energy Charter signed. USSR dissolves.
- 1992: Maastricht Treaty signed, Denmark fails to ratify. European Economic Area (EEA) agreement signed, Switzerland fails to ratify.
- 1993: Single European Market enters force. Maastricht is ratified and enters into force.
- 1994: European Monetary Institute established. EEA enters force. Committee of the Regions established. Accession negotiations for Austria, Norway, Sweden and Finland conclude. European Investment Fund established. Hungary and Poland apply to join. Fourth direct elections to the Parliament are held.

== Members ==
The three Delors Commissions (generally known as "Delors I", Delors II" and "Delors III") had considerable continuity of membership and political balance, but there were nonetheless differences.

=== First college ===
This Commission served from 1985 to 1988, although the Spanish and Portuguese members only joined as from their countries' membership of the European Communities on 1 January 1986.

Portfolio	Name	State	Party
President	Jacques Delors	France	Socialist Party
Vice-President; Agriculture and fisheries	Frans Andriessen	Netherlands	CDA
Vice-President; Budget, financial control, personnel and administration	Henning Christophersen	Denmark	Venstre
Vice-President; Internal market, tax law and customs	Lord Cockfield	United Kingdom	Conservative Party
Vice-President; Social affairs, employment and education	Manuel Marin	Spain	PSOE
Vice-President; Industry, information technology and science and research	Karl-Heinz Narjes	Germany	CDU
Vice-President; Cooperation, development affairs and enlargement	Lorenzo Natali	Italy	DC
Mediterranean policy and north–south relations	Claude Cheysson	France	Socialist Party
External relations and trade policy	Willy De Clercq	Belgium	Liberal
Environment, consumer protection and transport	Stanley Clinton Davis	United Kingdom	Labour
Fisheries	António Cardoso e Cunha	Portugal	Social Democratic Party
Credit, investments, financial instruments and small & medium-sized enterprises	Abel Matutes	Spain	People's Party
Energy & Euratom	Nicolas Mosar	Luxembourg	CSV
Economic affairs and employment	Alois Pfeiffer	Germany	CSU
Institutional reforms, information policy, culture and tourism	Carlo Ripa di Meana	Italy	PSI
Economic affairs and employment	Peter Schmidhuber	Germany	CSU
Competition, social affairs and education	Peter Sutherland	Ireland	Fine Gael
Relations with the European Parliament, regional policy and consumer protection	Grigoris Varfis	Greece	PASOK

=== Second college ===
This Commission served from 1989 to 1992.

Portfolio	Name	State	Party
President	Jacques Delors	France	PS
Vice-President; External relations and trade policy	Frans Andriessen	Netherlands	CDA
Vice-President; Internal market and industrial affairs	Martin Bangemann	Germany	FDP
Vice-President; Competition and financial institutions	Sir Leon Brittan	United Kingdom	Conservative
Vice-President; Economic & financial affairs and coordination of structural funds	Henning Christophersen	Denmark	Venstre
Vice-President; Cooperation, development and fisheries	Manuel Marin	Spain	PSOE
Vice-President; Science, research, development, telecommunications and innovation	Filippo Maria Pandolfi	Italy	DC
Energy, Euratom, small businesses; staff and translation	António Cardoso e Cunha	Portugal	PSD
Audiovisual and cultural affairs	Jean Dondelinger	Luxembourg	None
Agriculture and rural development	Ray MacSharry	Ireland	Fianna Fáil
Mediterranean and Latin American policy	Abel Matutes	Spain	People's Party
Transport and consumer protection	Karel Van Miert	Belgium	SP
Regional Policy	Bruce Millan	United Kingdom	Labour
Employment, industrial relations and social affairs	Vasso Papandreou	Greece	PASOK
Environment, nuclear safety and civil protection	Carlo Ripa di Meana	Italy	PSI
Budget	Peter Schmidhuber	Germany	CSU
Taxation and customs union	Christiane Scrivener	France	Republican Party

=== Third college ===
This Commission served from 1993 to 1994. It was the first Commission of the European Union, with the Maastricht Treaty coming into force. Its short tenure was designed to bring the mandates of the Commission into line with those of the European Parliament.

Portfolio	Name	State	Party
President	Jacques Delors	France	PS
Vice-President; Internal market, industrial affairs and ICT	Martin Bangemann	Germany	FDP
Vice-President; External economic affairs and trade policy	Sir Leon Brittan	United Kingdom	Conservative
Vice-President; Economic and financial affairs	Henning Christophersen	Denmark	Venstre
Vice-President; Cooperation, development and humanitarian aid	Manuel Marin	Spain	PSOE
Vice-President; Competition	Karel Van Miert	Belgium	SP
Vice-President; Science, research, technological development and education	Antonio Ruberti	Italy	PSI
Transport and energy	Marcelino Oreja	Spain	People's Party
Environment, fisheries	Ioannis Paleokrassas	Greece	ND
Agriculture and rural development	René Steichen	Luxembourg	CSV
Transport and energy	Abel Matutes	Spain	People's Party
Institutional reform, internal market and enterprise	Raniero Vanni d'Archirafi	Italy	None
Taxation, customs union and consumer policies	Christiane Scrivener	France	Liberal
Budget, financial control and the cohesion fund	Peter Schmidhuber	Germany	CSU
Social affairs and employment	Pádraig Flynn	Ireland	Fianna Fáil
Relations with Parliament, culture and audiovisual	João de Deus Pinheiro	Portugal	PSD/PP
External relations and enlargement	Hans van den Broek	Netherlands	CDA
Regional policy and cohesion	Bruce Millan	United Kingdom	Labour

=== Key ===
The colour of the row indicates the approximate political leaning of the office holder using the following scheme:

Affiliation	First term	Second term	Third term
Right leaning / Conservative	10	7	8
Left leaning / Socialist	6	7	5
Centrist / Liberal	2	3	3
Other / Unknown	0	1	1

=== Secretary-General ===
The Secretary-General of the European Commission throughout the three Delors Commissions was David Williamson.

== See also ==
- Single European Act
- Treaty of Maastricht
- EMU
- Delors building
- European Navigator
