= European Commissioner for Trade and Economic Security =

Member of the EU Commission

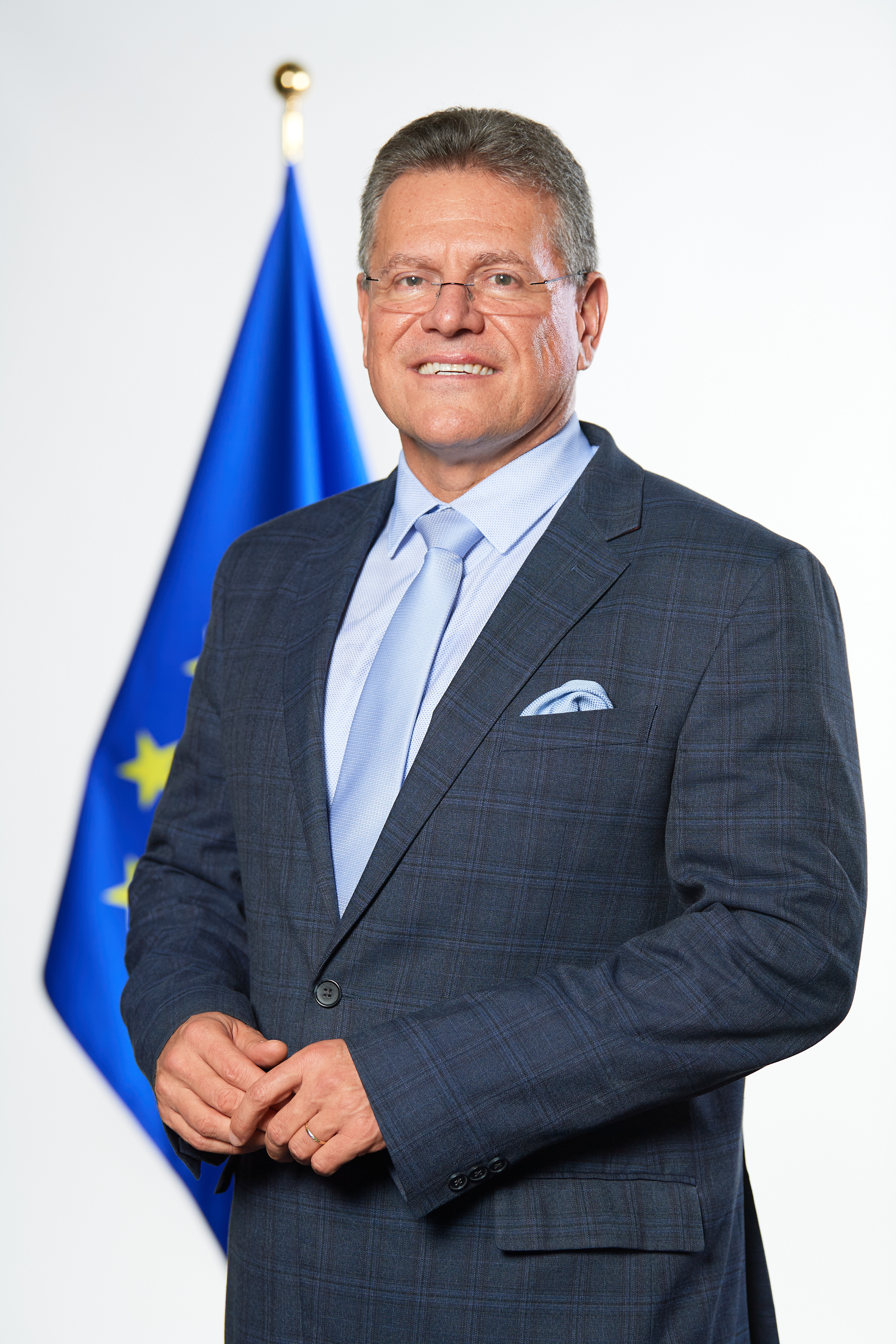
- Incumbent; Maroš Šefčovič since 1 December 2024
- Appointer: President of the European Commission
- Term length: Five years
- Inaugural holder: Jean Rey
- Formation: 1958

The European Commissioner for Trade and Economic Security (sometimes referred to as the EU Trade Commissioner) is the member of the European Commission responsible for the European Union's common commercial policy.

== Responsibilities ==
The Commissioner heads up the Directorate-General for Trade in defining the commercial policy of the EU, which has been exclusively under the EU's mandate since the Treaty of Rome in 1957. Due to the size of the European economy, being the world's largest market and having a huge slice of world trade, this position can be very important in dealing with other world economic powers such as China or the United States. Former Commissioner Leon Brittan commented that "Frankly, it is more important than most [national] cabinet jobs".

The Commissioner defines the trade interests of the EU and negotiates bilateral, regional or multilateral agreements with third countries. They also monitor the implementation of such agreements and deals with any unfair practices, devise and monitor internal and external policies concerning international trade, ensure consistency in EU external policies and provide up-to-date public and industrial economic information.

=== WTO ===
The EU has been a member of the World Trade Organization (WTO) in its own right since the WTO was founded on 1 January 1995, alongside its member states. Until 1 December 2009, it held WTO membership under the name European Communities rather than European Union.

The EU forms its own customs union with a common external tariff and commercial international trade policy, which means that the EU operates as a single actor at the WTO, represented by the European Commission.

EU trade policy is decided by the Article 133 Committee – named after the article of the EU treaties on which its trade policy is based – which brings together the commission and member states to decide policy. Actual negotiations are carried out by the commission's Directorate-General for Trade under the authority of the Trade Commissioner.

Current plans for the European External Action Service (EEAS) may see trade and WTO relations being transferred from the commission to the EEAS and the High Representative of the Union for Foreign Affairs and Security Policy.

The EU has been involved in a large number of trade disputes with other WTO members, most notably the United States, having brought 81 cases to the WTO, had 67 brought against it and been a third party in a further 88, as of March 2010.

== Commissioners ==
=== Peter Mandelson (2004–2008) ===
At his hearing at the European Parliament in 2004, Peter Mandelson expressed a desire to develop multilateral rule-based trade, benefiting the poor as well as helping general economic development. He has been noted for being pro-European and an Atlanticist.

Concluding WTO talks has been a contentious point after the collapse of the Doha Development Round, with the EU not willing to cut agricultural subsidies without similar action by the United States.

Mandelson proposed the creation of European golden shares in July 2007, to protect certain European companies, such as Airbus, from foreign takeovers. The commission has generally been against golden shares due to their ability to distort the Single Market, the idea being that European golden shares would protect certain companies, but not other European companies, from outside influence.

Mandelson stated that he did not intend to seek another term in the commission after 2009, stepping down in 2008 to become Business Secretary in the Brown ministry. Although his tenure was supported by business representatives in Brussels in light of his advocacy of free trade, his departure was generally welcomed by development NGOs and fair trade campaigners, who viewed his attitude towards developing countries as aggressive, supporting European big business over development goals.

=== Catherine Ashton (2008–2009) ===
Catherine Ashton was nominated by Gordon Brown to replace Mandelson on 3 October, and formally appointed on 6 October. Although a life peer, she did not use her title Baroness Ashton of Upholland during her commissionship.

Ashton became the new High Representative on 1 December 2009, being replaced as Trade Commissioner by Benita Ferrero-Waldner until the second Barroso Commission was in place.

=== Karel De Gucht (2010–2014) ===
Karel De Gucht was appointed Commissioner on 9 February 2010, however his statements to the European Parliament ahead of his appointment were met with dismay by trade justice campaigners, who claimed his "responses at his three-hour hearing revealed his corporate sympathies and gave little indication that the change of personnel at the European Trade Commission will lead to any change in the direction of European trade policy."

De Gucht criticised China for undervaluing the renminbi and the United States for protectionism and incoherence over the Doha round. This further came after EADS pulled out of a US defence contract bid – that it had previously won before it was reopened – claiming bias against them in the tender process.

De Gucht achieved important trade agreements during his commissionship, among others, with South Korea (2011), Colombia and Peru (2013) and Central America, Singapore, Georgia, Moldova and Ukraine (2014). The comprehensive trade agreement with Ukraine was a direct cause of the upheavals in Independence Square and the Revolution of Dignity. He concluded CETA, the first ever agreement with a G7 member, in October 2014. He also concluded landmark economic partnership agreements with ECOWAS, SADC and EAC, covering a total of 75% of the African economy. The EAC trade agreement was signed in Nairobi on 31 October 2014, his last day in office.

He left office while several trade negotiations were still ongoing. He oversaw the start of trade negotiations with Japan and Vietnam, resumed talks with Mercosur and began investment agreement negotiations with China. He also prepared and launched the Transatlantic Trade and Investment Partnership (TTIP) in 2013.

He enjoyed a strong reputation within the Commission at the end of his mandate, because of his progression of the trade portfolio and his strong views on European policy questions. On the other hand, he had to deal with some criticism in the general public and the media because of the apparently intransparent European negotiation mandate in the ongoing TTIP trade negotiations with the US, which gave rise to a number of rumours. The concerns were partially relieved after the negotiation mandate was released to the public in October 2014.

=== Cecilia Malmström (2014–2019) ===
Cecilia Malmström was appointed Commissioner on 1 November 2014. The mission letter for her new post mentioned the successful conclusion of TTIP as one of her key duties, but with a number of restrictions and confinements to the negotiation mandate in order to address European public concerns. The confinements were the result of the hearing in the European Parliament a few weeks previously, where she was faced with some tough questions over TTIP negotiations. She tried to revive the negotiations with the United States two weeks after entering office.

=== Phil Hogan (2019–2020) ===
Phil Hogan was appointed Commissioner on 1 December 2019.

He said in his confirmation hearings that he intended to sign the EU-China Comprehensive Agreement on Investment in 2020, while Commission President Ursula von der Leyen said that she wanted a trade agreement with the United Kingdom before the end of 2020.

However, in light of his conduct surrounding the Oireachtas Golf Society scandal, Hogan resigned from his role on 26 August 2020.

=== Valdis Dombrovskis (2020–2024) ===
After Phil Hogan's resignation, Commission President Ursula von der Leyen invited the Irish government to present "suitable candidates" for the vacant Commissioner position. On 27 August 2020, von der Leyen designated Valdis Dombrovskis as interim Commissioner for Trade, who at the time also served as Commissioner for Financial Stability, Financial Services and the Capital Markets Union. Dombrovskis was formally named Commissioner for Trade on 8 September 2020, leading to Ireland losing the trade portfolio on the commission, and gaining Dombrovskis' former Finance portfolio.

== List ==
#	Name	Country	Period	Commission
1	Jean Rey	Belgium	1957–1962; 1962–1967	Hallstein I Hallstein II
2	Jean-François Deniau	France	1968–1970	Rey
3	Ralf Dahrendorf	West Germany	1970–1972; 1972–1973	Malfatti; Mansholt
4	Christopher Soames	United Kingdom	1973–1977	Ortoli
5	Wilhelm Haferkamp	West Germany	1977–1981; 1981–1985	Jenkins; Thorn
6	Willy De Clercq	Belgium	1985–1988	Delors I
7	Frans Andriessen	Netherlands	1989–1992	Delors II
8	Leon Brittan	United Kingdom	1993–1995; 1995–1999	Delors III; Santer
9	Pascal Lamy	France	1999–2004	Prodi
10	Danuta Hübner	Poland	2004	Prodi
11	Peter Mandelson	United Kingdom	2004–2008	Barroso I
12	Catherine Ashton	United Kingdom	2008–2009	Barroso I
13	Benita Ferrero-Waldner	Austria	2009–2010	Barroso I
14	Karel De Gucht	Belgium	2010–2014	Barroso II
15	Cecilia Malmström	Sweden	2014–2019	Juncker
16	Phil Hogan	Ireland	2019–2020	von der Leyen I
17	Valdis Dombrovskis	Latvia	2020–2024	von der Leyen I
18	Maroš Šefčovič	Slovakia	2024–present	von der Leyen II

== See also ==
- Commerce minister
- Directorate-General for Trade
  - David O'Sullivan
- Foreign relations of the European Union
- Economy of the European Union
