= Prodi Commission =

European Commission from 1999 to 2004

- 3rd Commission of the European Union

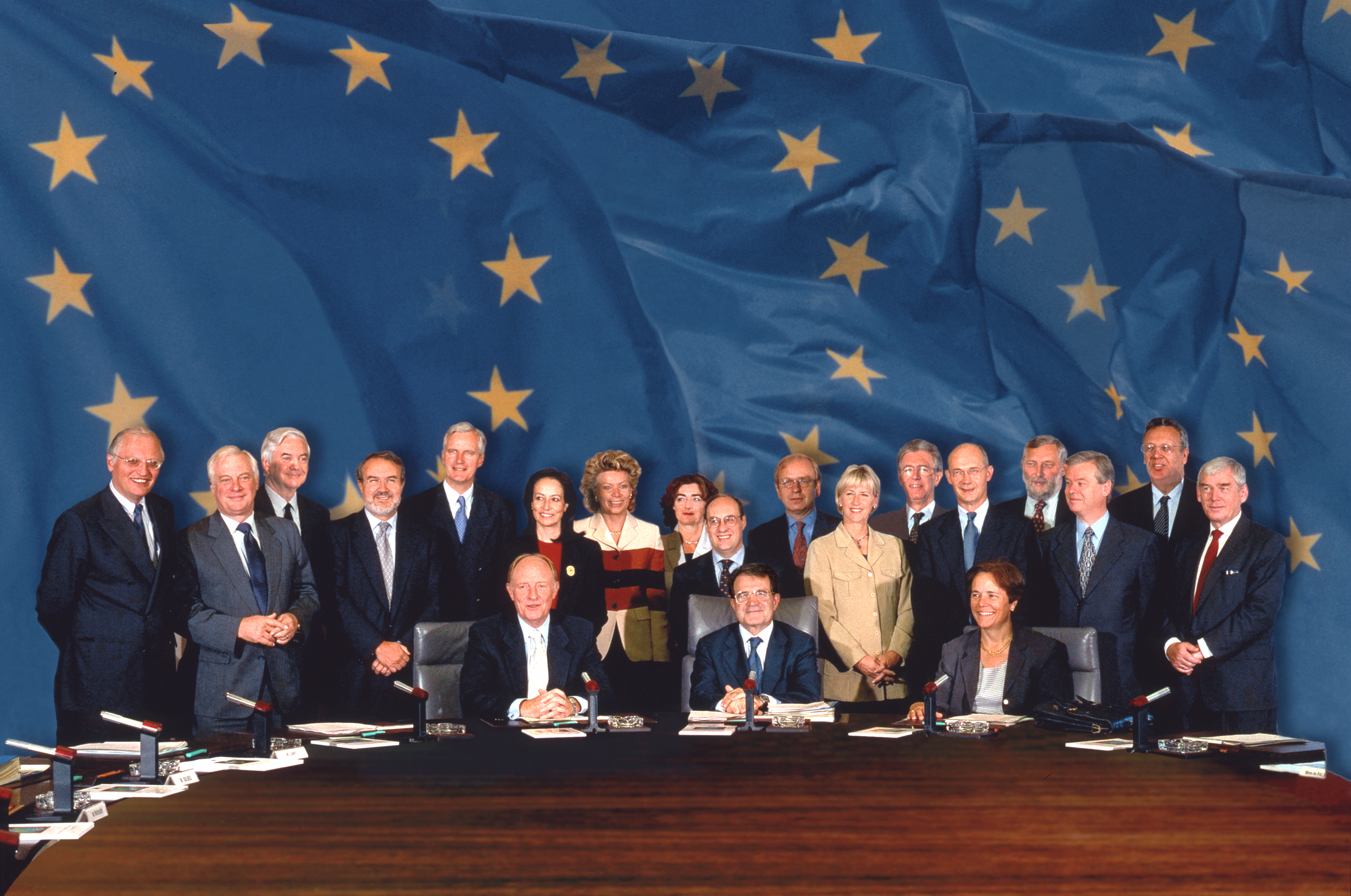
- Date formed: 16 September 1999
- Date dissolved: 21 November 2004

History
- Election(s): 1999 European Parliament election
- Predecessor: Santer Commission
- Successor: Barroso Commission I

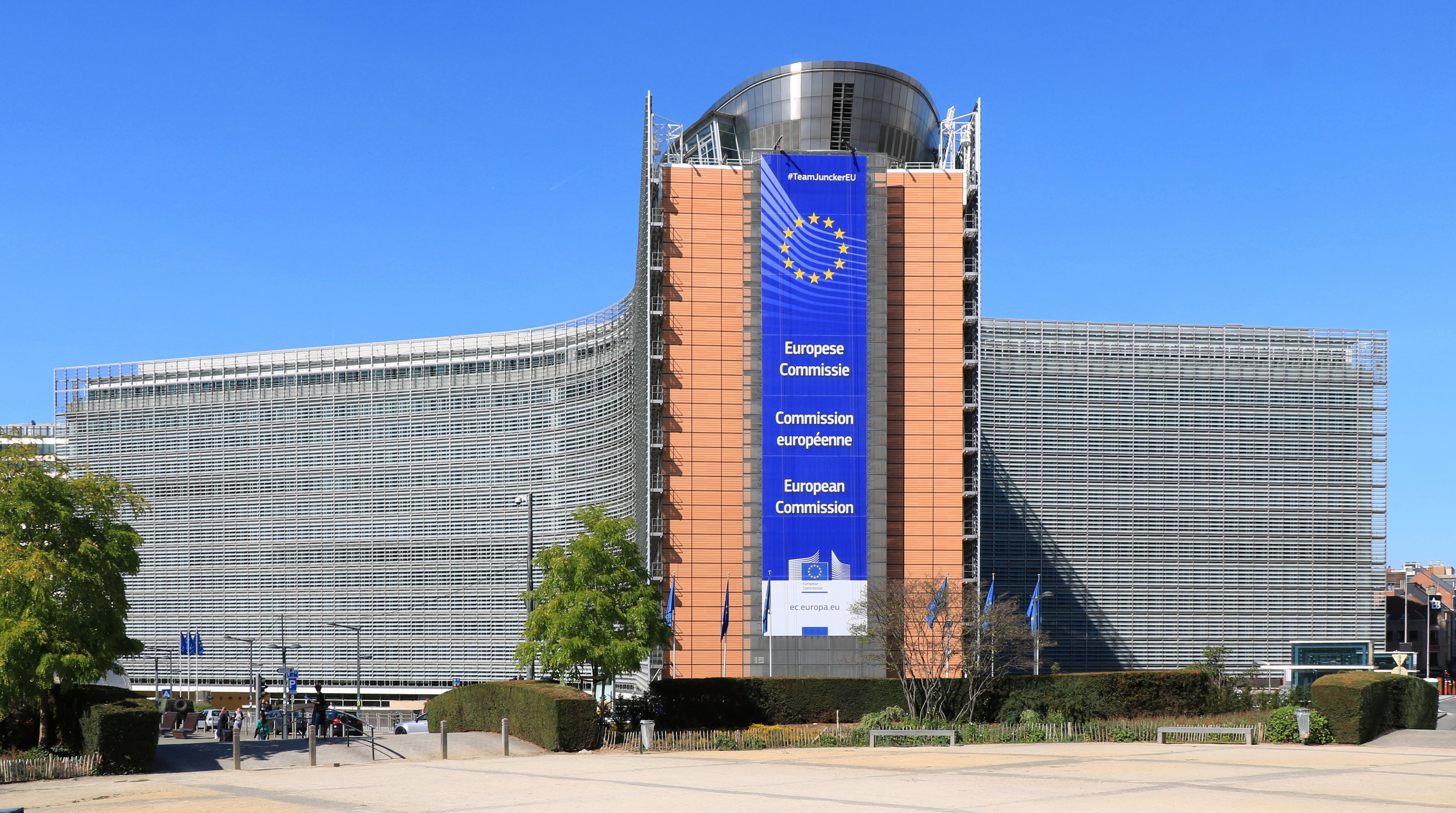
Headquarters of the European Commission in Brussels

The Prodi Commission was the European Commission in office between 1999 and 2004. The administration was led by former Italian Prime Minister Romano Prodi.

== History ==
The commission took office on 16 September 1999 following the scandal and subsequent resignation of the Santer Commission which had damaged the reputation of the institution. The college consisted of 20 Commissioners which grew to 30 following the Enlargement of the European Union in 2004. It was the last commission to see two members allocated to the larger member states.

This commission (the 10th) saw in increase in power and influence following the Amsterdam Treaty. Some in the media described president Prodi as being the first "Prime Minister of the European Union".

As well as the enlargement and Amsterdam Treaty, the Prodi Commission also saw the signing and enforcement of the Nice Treaty as well as the conclusion and signing of the European Constitution: in which he introduced the "Convention method" of negotiation. From 1999 Prodi saw in the euro and by 2002 it came into cash form and the single currency for 12 of the EU's 15 member states. The body was however criticised for being lacklustre, with poor communication and failing to make an impact despite major events such as enlargement and the euro.

The commission was due to leave office on 31 October 2004, but due to opposition from the European Parliament to the proposed Barroso Commission which would succeed it, it was extended and finally left office on 21 November 2004.

== Commissioners ==
New commissioners following the 2004 enlargement with president Prodi

When the Commission took office in 1999, there were 20 Commissioners, one from each member state and two from the largest 5 states (Italy, France, Germany, Spain and the United Kingdom).

2004 saw 15 new Commissioners, 5 replacing existing Commissioners who had resigned before the end of their mandate and 10 from the new member states who joined in that year. Most of these Commissioners continued to serve in the following Barroso Commission.

The members from the new states shared a portfolio with an existing member, rather than creating new posts or having Commissioners (old or new) without a portfolio.

The following table indicates the number of Commissioners according to their political alignment at the start of the commission, those who joined from the new member states and the number when the Commission left office. The colours reflect those used in the table of Commissioners below.

=== By political affiliation ===
Political alignment	1999 to 2003	Joined on 4 May	November 2004
Social Democrats (PES)	10	0	8
Liberals (ELDR)	2	2	6
Centre-right (EPP-ED)	5	3	9
Greens (EGP)	1	0	1
Independent	2	5	6

=== Initial College ===
Commissioner	Portrait	Portfolio	State	Party	Notes
Romano Prodi		President	Italy	ELDR; National: ID/DL	
Neil Kinnock		Vice-President; Administrative Reform	United Kingdom	PES; National: Labour	
Loyola de Palacio		Vice-President; Inter-Institutional Relations and Administration, Transport and Energy	Spain	EPP; National: PP	
Mario Monti		Competition	Italy	Independent	
Franz Fischler		Agriculture and Fisheries	Austria	EPP; National: ÖVP	
Erkki Liikanen		Enterprise and Information Society	Finland	PES; National: SDP	Served until 12 July 2004
Olli Rehn		Enterprise and Information Society	Finland	ELDR; National: Keskusta	Served from 12 July 2004
Frits Bolkestein		Internal Market	Netherlands	ELDR; National: VVD	
Philippe Busquin		Research	Belgium	PES; National: PS	Served until July 2004
Louis Michel		Research	Belgium	ELDR; National: MR	Served from July 2004
Poul Nielson		Development and Humanitarian Aid	Denmark	PES; National: SD	
Günter Verheugen		Enlargement	Germany	PES; National: SPD	
Chris Patten		External Relations	United Kingdom	ED; National: Conservatives	
Pascal Lamy		Trade	France	PES; National: PS	
David Byrne		Health and Consumer Protection	(Republic of Ireland) Ireland	Independent	
Viviane Reding		Education and Culture	Luxembourg	EPP; National: CSV	
Michaele Schreyer		Budget	Germany	EGP; National: DG	
Margot Wallström		Environment	Sweden	PES; National: SAP	
António Vitorino		Justice and Home Affairs	Portugal	PES; National: PS	
Anna Diamantopoulou		Employment and Social Affairs	Greece	PES; National: PASOK	Served until March 2004
Stavros Dimas		Employment and Social Affairs	Greece	EPP; National: ND	Served from March 2004
Michel Barnier		Regional Policy	France	EPP; National: UMP	Served until April 2004
Jacques Barrot		Regional Policy	France	EPP; National: UMP	Served from April 2004
Pedro Solbes		Economic and Monetary Affairs	Spain	PES; National: PSOE	Served until 26 April 2004
Joaquín Almunia		Economic and Monetary Affairs	Spain	PES; National: PSOE	Served from 26 April 2004

=== New commissioners from 1 May 2004 ===
Commissioner	Portrait	Portfolio	State	Party	Notes
Péter Balázs		Regional Policy	Hungary	Independent	
Danuta Hübner		Trade	Poland	Party of European Socialists; National: Independent	
Siim Kallas		Economic and Monetary Affairs	Estonia	ELDR; National: Reform	
Joe Borg		Development & Humanitarian Aid	Malta	EPP; National: PN	
Sandra Kalniete		Agriculture and Fisheries	Latvia	EPP; National: Vienotiba	
Dalia Grybauskaitė		Education and Culture	Lithuania	Independent	
Janez Potočnik		Enlargement	Slovenia	Independent	
Ján Figeľ		Enterprise and Information Society	Slovakia	EPP; National: KDH	
Markos Kyprianou		Budget	Cyprus	ELDR; National: DIKO	
Pavel Telička		Health and Consumer Protection	Czech Republic	Independent	

== See also ==
- Bolkestein Directive
- Treaty establishing a Constitution for Europe
