= Henning Christophersen =

Danish politician (1939–2016)

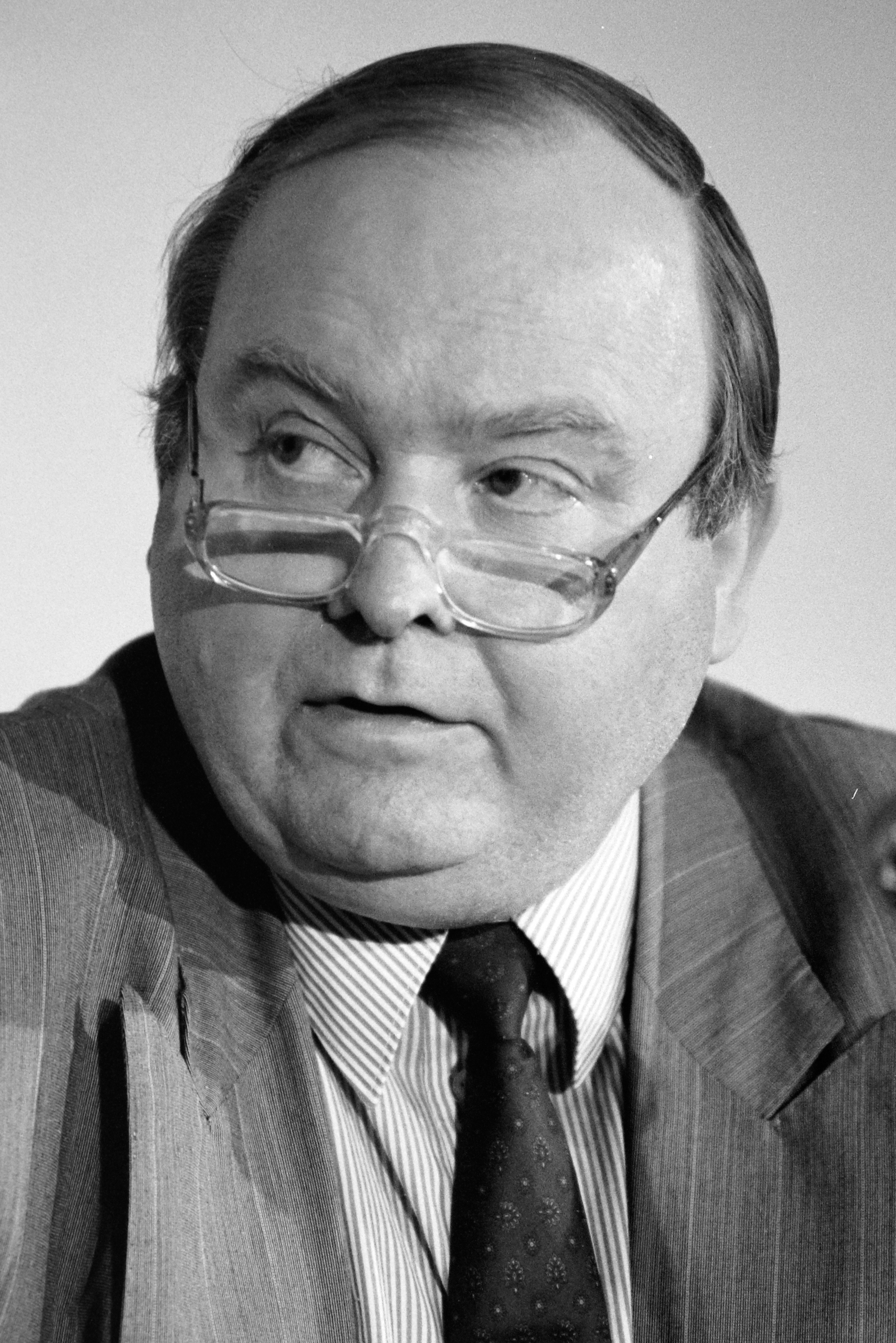
- Christophersen in 1990

Vice President of the European Commission for Economic & Financial Affairs
- In office 6 January 1989 – 22 January 1995
- President: Jacques Delors
- Preceded by: François-Xavier Ortoli
- Succeeded by: Yves-Thibault de Silguy

Vice President of the European Commission for Financial Programming & the Budget
- In office 6 January 1985 – 5 January 1989
- President: Jacques Delors
- Preceded by: Christopher Tugendhat
- Succeeded by: Peter Schmidhuber

Minister of Finance
- In office 10 September 1982 – 23 July 1984
- Prime Minister: Poul Schlüter
- Preceded by: Knud Heinesen
- Succeeded by: Palle Simonsen

Minister of Foreign Affairs
- In office 30 August 1978 – 26 October 1979
- Prime Minister: Anker Jørgensen
- Preceded by: Anker Jørgensen
- Succeeded by: Kjeld Olesen

Leader of Venstre
- In office September 1978 – 23 July 1984
- Preceded by: Poul Hartling
- Succeeded by: Uffe Ellemann-Jensen

Member of the Folketing
- In office 1971–1984

Personal details
- Born: 8 November 1939 Copenhagen, Denmark
- Died: 31 December 2016 (aged 77) Brussels, Belgium
- Party: Venstre
- Occupation: Politician

Henning Christophersen (8 November 1939 – 31 December 2016) was a Danish politician, who served as Vice President of the European Commission (1985–1995), leader of the Danish liberal party Venstre (1978–1984) and a member of the European Convention. Christophersen was one of the early architects of the Single Market and the Euro.

== Life ==
Christophersen was born in Copenhagen. He was Deputy Prime minister and Finance Minister of Denmark (1982–1984) and Foreign Minister of Denmark (1978–1979).

During his time as Vice President of the European Commission for Budget and later for Economic & Financial Affairs, Christophersen decisively contributed to the preparations of the launch of the Euro and of the Economic & Monetary Union. Through his pioneering work on Transeuropean Networks, he also played a big role in the realization of the Internal Market.

In 1992, as EU commissioner, Christophersen together with 10 Baltic Ministers of Foreign Affairs founded the Council of the Baltic Sea States (CBSS) and the EuroFaculty.

He was the Chairman of the Energy Charter Conference 1998 until 2007.

He was Chairman and member of a number of Supervisory Boards of Directors, and a Partner of Kreab, Brussels.

Christophersen died on 31 December 2016 in Brussels at the age of 77 after a short illness.

== Sources ==
- Tom Matz (2004), Venstre ved du hvor du har ForlagsKompagniet : Nørhaven Book.

Political offices
Preceded by Anker Jørgensen	Foreign Minister of Denmark; 30 August 1978 – 26 October 1979	Succeeded by Kjeld Olesen
Preceded by Knud Heinesen	Finance Minister of Denmark; 10 September 1982 – 23 July 1984	Succeeded by Palle Simonsen
Preceded by...	Vice-President of the European Commission; 1985–1995	Succeeded by Leon Brittan
Preceded by François-Xavier Ortoli	European Commissioner for Economic and Financial Affairs; 1985–1995	Succeeded by Yves-Thibault de Silguy
Preceded by Poul Dalsager	Danish European Commissioner; 1985–1995	Succeeded by Ritt Bjerregaard
Party political offices
Preceded by Poul Hartling	Leader of Venstre; 1977–1984	Succeeded by Uffe Ellemann-Jensen
