= 2024 ANO 2011 leadership election =

- 10 February 2024
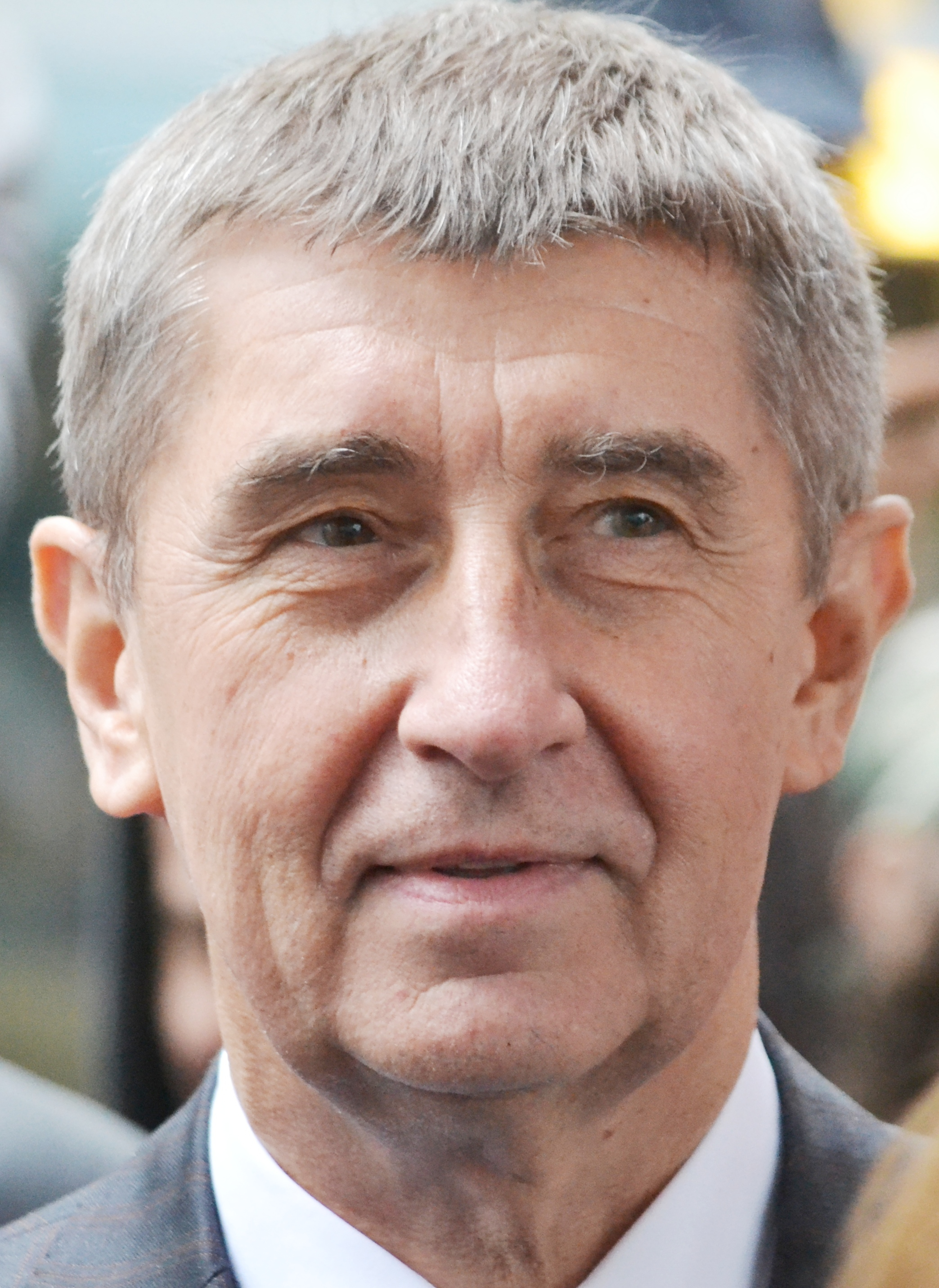
| Candidate | Andrej Babiš |
| Electoral vote | 88 |
| Percentage | 89.8% |
leader of ANO 2011 before election
Andrej Babiš
Elected leader of ANO 2011
Andrej Babiš

The next leadership election for ANO 2011 was held on 10 February 2024. Incumbent leader Andrej Babiš initially stated that he would not run for another term in 2024, but eventually changed his mind.

== Background ==
Andrej Babiš led the party since establishment of the party in 2011. The last leadership election was held on 12 February 2022 with Babiš being reelected. Babiš announced during his speech that ANO 2011 has to look for his successor: "In 2024, you must elect a new chairman who will become the new face and new leader of our movement and lead ANO 2011 to the next legislative elections in 2025." CNN Prima News reported that members of the party have already started looking for Babiš' successor with Karel Havlíček and Ivo Vondrák being main candidates. Vondrák himself confirmed his intention to succeed Babiš in 2024. Various media also speculated that election might be held sooner than 2024 due to potential Babiš' candidacy in 2023 Czech presidential election.

Following 2023 Czech presidential election, Novinky.cz reported that sources from within the party stated that Babiš intends for Karel Havlíček to become his successor. On 8 February 2023, Babiš announced that Havlíček will become Shadow Prime Minister in the Shadow Cabinet of ANO 2011. Vondrák left ANO on 24 February 2023, thus became ineligible to run.

On 29 October 2023, Babiš announced that he will seek reelection despite his previous claims.

== Potential candidates ==
- Andrej Babiš, the incumbent leader stated that he would not run, but some political scientists such as Jiří Pehe believe that he changed his mind. On 21 September 2022 Babiš stated that he might eventually run for leadership in 2024 despite ruling it out previously.
- Karel Havlíček, MP and former Minister of Industry and Trade and former Minister of Transport.

== Voting ==
98 delegates were allowed to vote. Babiš was the only candidate. Babiš received 88 votes and thus was reelected.

Result
| Candidate | Votes | % |
|---|---|---|
| Andrej Babiš | 88 | 89.8% |
| Abstained | 9 | 9.18% |
| Against | 1 | 1.02% |
