= Věra Jourová =

Czech politician

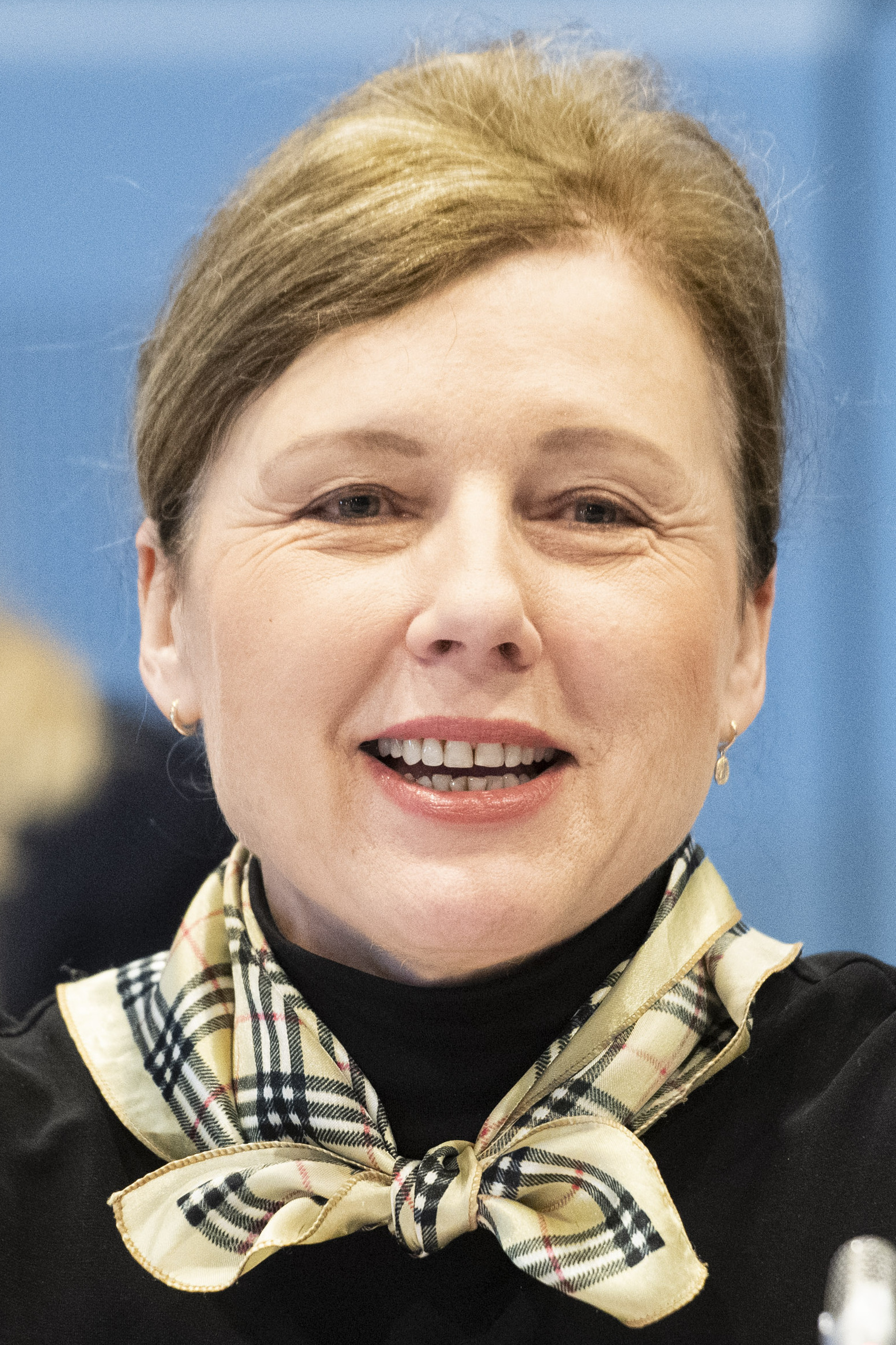
- Jourová in 2023

European Commissioner for Values and Transparency
- In office 1 December 2019 – 30 November 2024
- Commission: Von der Leyen I
- Preceded by: Position established
- Succeeded by: Disbursed among 7 commissioners

European Commissioner for Justice, Consumers and Gender Equality
- In office 1 November 2014 – 30 November 2019
- Commission: Juncker
- Preceded by: Martine Reicherts (Justice, Fundamental Rights and Citizenship); Neven Mimica (Consumer Protection)
- Succeeded by: Didier Reynders (Justice); Helena Dalli (Equality)

15th Minister of Regional Development
- In office 29 January 2014 – 8 October 2014
- Prime Minister: Bohuslav Sobotka
- Preceded by: František Lukl
- Succeeded by: Karla Šlechtová

Member of the Chamber of Deputies
- In office 26 October 2013 – 21 October 2014

Personal details
- Born: 18 August 1964 (age 61) Třebíč, Czechoslovakia (now Czech Republic)
- Party: ANO 2011 (2012–2024)
- Other political affiliations: European Democratic Party (2008–2010)
- Children: 2
- Education: Charles University

Věra Jourová (Note: Czech pronunciation: [ˈvjɛra ˈjourovaː]) (born 18 August 1964) is a Czech politician and lawyer who served as Vice-President of the European Commission for Values and Transparency from 2019 to 2024, and as the European Commissioner for Justice, Consumers and Gender Equality from 2014 to 2019. She served as a Member of the Chamber of Deputies between 2013 and 2014 and as the Czech Minister for Regional Development in 2014.

In 2019, Time magazine ranked Jourová in its list of 100 most influential people of the year, citing her role in the adoption of the General Data Protection Regulation and new privacy rights as European Commissioner. In 2025, she received the Cena města Třebíče (Třebíč City Award), the highest honor awarded by the city of Třebíč.

== Early life and education ==
Jourová grew up in Třebíč in the Vysočina Region, where her parents, a kindergarten teacher and caterer, ran a folk troupe. She studied cultural anthropology at Charles University in Prague, while raising two children. Upon graduation, she returned to work in the Třebíč municipal office. In 2012, Jourová graduated with a magister degree from the Faculty of Law of Charles University.

== Public sector career ==
Jourová served as secretary and spokesperson of the Třebíč municipal office from 1995 until 2000. She later served as head of the Department of Regional Development for the Vysočina Region from 2001 to 2003. Jourová entered national politics when she was appointed to work as deputy head of the Ministry of Regional Development, where she led the European Integration Section until March 2006. Her responsibilities included leading the Czech team that negotiated EU funds with the European Commission and European Investment Bank, as well as managing EU funds in the Czech Republic.

In October 2006, Jourová was accused of accepting a 2 million Kč bribe from Ladislav Péťa, mayor of Budišov, South Moravia, in return for securing EU subsidies for the reconstruction of the Budišov Chateau. Although she was fully exonerated, she spent more than a month in pre-trial detention. The prosecution was suspended in mid-2008, when the police came forward and said that the bribery had never happened. Between 2006 and 2013, Jourová was an independent consultant providing advice on EU matters to the Czech Republic, Romania, Germany, Belarus, Latvia, Estonia, North Macedonia, Serbia, Montenegro, and Moldova.

== Political career ==
=== National politics ===
Jourová has been a member of the ANO political party since 2012, and from 2013, she was the movement's deputy chair. She was elected as a member of the Chamber of Deputies in October 2013, and became Minister for Regional Development in January 2014 in the government of Bohuslav Sobotka. Her popularity ratings remained consistently high, as the party finished in second place in the 2013 national elections and first in the 2014 European elections.

=== Member of the European Commission (2014–2024) ===
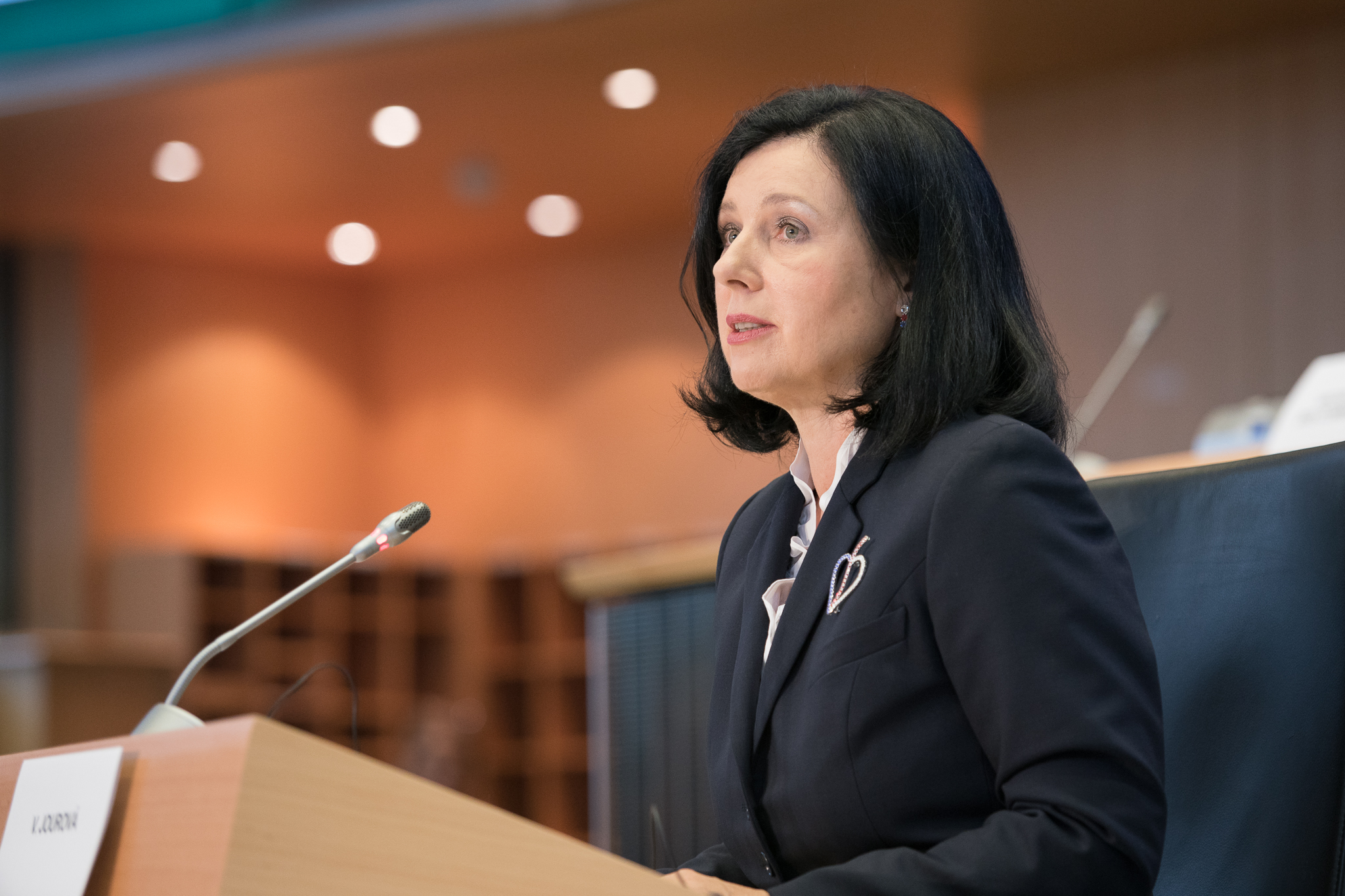
Jourová testifies before the European Parliament in 2019 for confirmation as Vice-President and Commissioner for Values and Transparency.

In July 2014, the three parties in the Czech government agreed to nominate Jourová as the country's next European commissioner. At the time, there was speculation she was being considered for the posts of European Commissioner for Regional Policy or Internal Market and Services.

After an EU Parliament hearing, she was confirmed as the European Union's Commissioner for Justice, Consumers and Gender Equality in the Juncker Commission. The Corporate Europe Observatory "expressed serious doubts" about her possible conflicts of interest due to her ties with ANO chair and billionaire businessman Andrej Babiš, who was also the Czech Finance Minister.

Her responsibilities as Commissioner included gender equality, judicial cooperation within the EU, and privacy concerns, including concluding negotiations on a comprehensive EU-U.S. Safe Harbor Agreement and working with the Vice-President for the Digital Single Market Andrus Ansip to pass EU data protection reform, and modernise and simplify consumer rules for online and digital purchases. In addition, her portfolio included "overseeing remuneration rules across the City of London, enforcing EU pay curbs and bonus caps", which had been explicitly carved out of Jonathan Hill's portfolio as Commissioner for Financial Stability, Financial Services and Capital Markets Union "amid concerns that members of the European Parliament will try to veto his appointment". In 2018, Jourová was put in charge of drafting rules to assess the independence and functioning of a country's judicial system as a condition for receiving funds from the budget of the European Union.

Jourová said that Germany acted "according to the rules" regarding Spain's extradition request for Catalan president Carles Puigdemont. Following the 2019 European elections, Babiš nominated Jourová for a second term in the European Commission.

In April 2021, Jourová was included in a list of eight public officials banned by Russia's Ministry of Foreign Affairs from entering the country in retaliation for EU sanctions on Russians.

== Later career ==
After leaving the European Commission, Jourová became an adviser to President Petr Pavel on European and international affairs. Since 2025, she has also been serving as Pro-Rector for Human Resources Development and New Technologies of Charles University.

== Other activities ==
- Jan Karski Foundation, Member of the Award Committee for the Jan Karski Eagle Award (since 2024)

Political offices
Preceded by Štefan Füle	Czech European Commissioner; 2014–2024	Succeeded by Jozef Síkela
Preceded by Martine Reicherts as European Commissioner for Justice, Fundamental Rights and Citizenship	European Commissioner for Justice, Consumers and Gender Equality; 2014–2019	Succeeded by Helena Dalli as European Commissioner for Equality
Preceded by Neven Mimica as European Commissioner for Consumer Protection	European Commissioner for Justice, Consumers and Gender Equality; 2014–2019	Succeeded by Didier Reynders as European Commissioner for Justice
