= Lukáš Vlček =

Czech politician

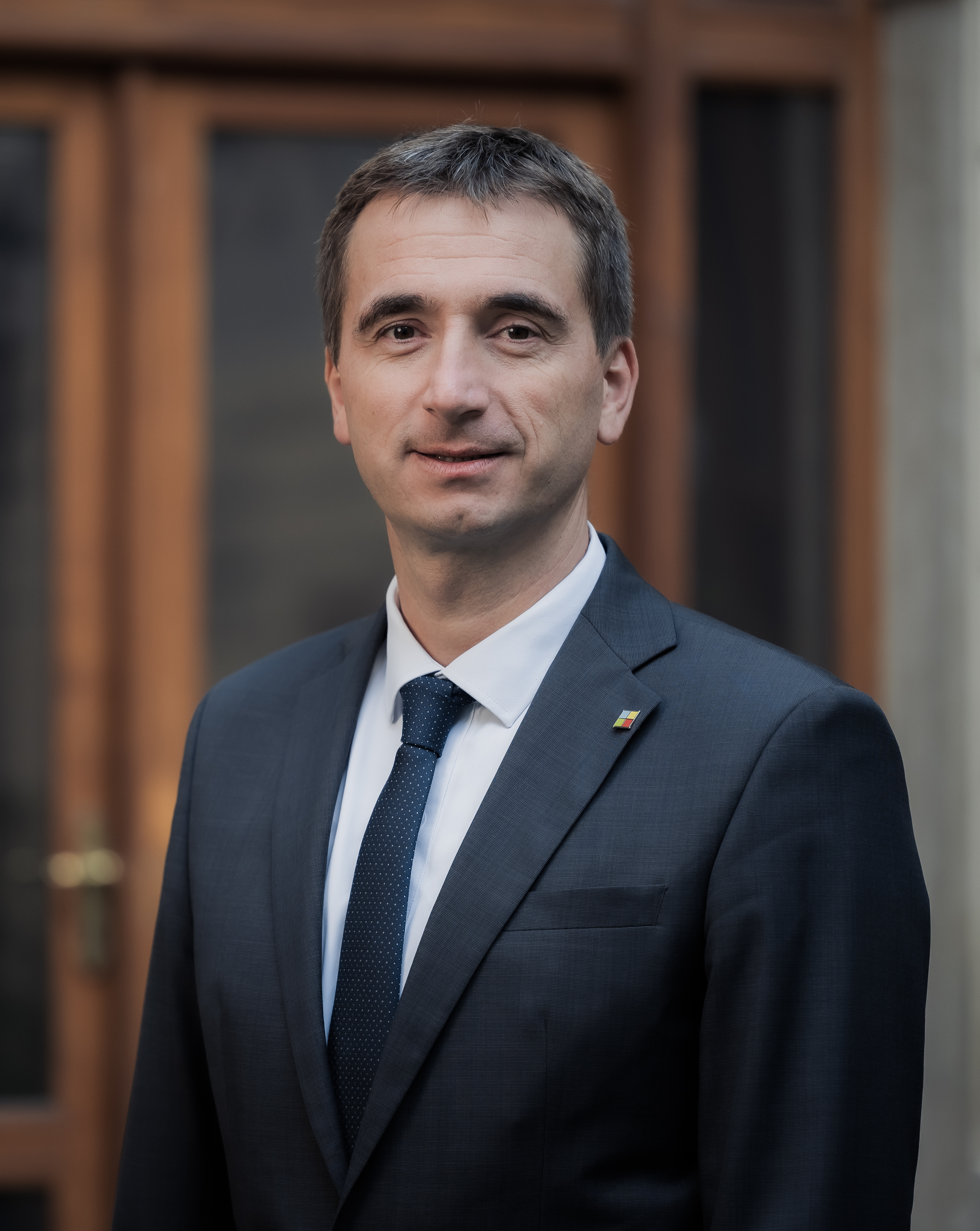

Minister of Industry and Trade
- In office 8 October 2024 – 15 December 2025
- Prime Minister: Petr Fiala
- Preceded by: Jozef Síkela
- Succeeded by: Karel Havlíček

Vice-chairman of Mayors and Independents
- Incumbent
- Assumed office 23 July 2022
- Preceded by: Jan Farský

Member of the Chamber of Deputies of the Czech Republic
- Incumbent
- Assumed office 9 October 2021

Representative of the Vysočina Region
- In office 13 October 2012 – 13 December 2021

Representative of Pacov
- Incumbent
- Assumed office 21 October 2006

Personal details
- Born: 27 February 1982 (age 44) Pelhřimov, Czechoslovakia
- Party: Mayors and Independents
- Children: 2

Lukáš Vlček (born 27 February 1982) is a Czech politician and businessman who served as Czech Minister of Industry and Trade in the Cabinet of Petr Fiala from October 2024 to December 2025. He has served as first vice-chairman of Mayors and Independents since July 2022. He has been both a member of the Chamber of Deputies of the Czech Republic and mayor of Pacov since 2021. Vlček previously served as a representative of the Vysočina Region from 2012 until 2021.

== Early life and education ==
Vlček was born on 27 February 1982 in Pelhřimov. He graduated with a master's degree in regional development and administration at Masaryk University, Faculty of Economics and Administration. Since 2006, he has been the deputy chairman of the board of the joint-stock company Sompo, which provides comprehensive services in the field of waste management. Vlček has also been a member of the board of directors of the Pevak Pelhřimov cooperative since 2006, which deals with the sale of water and the management and maintenance of waterworks facilities. He later became an executive and partner with a stake in the private consulting firm WHV Projekt.

== Political career ==
=== Early political career ===
In the 2004 Czech regional elections, Vlček failed to be elected as a non-party candidate for US-DEU as part of the Green Party coalition for the Vysočina Regional Representative, but was unsuccessful. He became a regional representative only after the 2012 regional elections as an independent candidate. In the 2016 regional elections, Vlček was leader of the joint candidate of STAN and SNK-ED in the Vysočina Region from the position of an independent member and eventually defended the mandate of regional representative.

Vlček was elected in the 2006 Czech municipal elections as a representative of the town of Pacov, later becoming mayor of the town. He defended the position of town representative in the 2010 and 2014 Czech municipal elections, the former as an independent candidate.

In April 2017, Vlček was elected chairman of the regional organization of the STAN movement in the Vysočina Region. He received the title of Best Mayor of the Vysočina Region during his tenure as mayor, but resigned in 2021 to become mayor of the town.

=== Member of Mayors and Independents ===
In the 2020 Czech regional elections, he led the joint candidate of the STAN and SNK ED movement in the Vysočina Region and defended the mandate of the regional representative. Between 2020 and 2021, he served as deputy governor of the Vysočina Region for agriculture on 18 November.

In the 2021 Czech parliamentary election, Vlček ran as a member of the STAN movement in second place among the candidates of the Pirates and Mayors coalition in the Vysočina Region. He received over 8,000 preferential votes and became a member. At the extraordinary convention of STAN in July 2022, Vlček was elected as vice-chairman, replacing Jan Farský in the position.

In the 2022 municipal elections, he ran for the council of Pacov from the second place as STAN candidate and defended the mandate of town representative again.

In the 2024 Czech regional elections, Vlček ran for the Representative Office of the Vysočina Region from the 7th place candidate of the "Mayors for Vysočina" coalition, winning the mandate of representative by finishing third place. Later that September, he was appointed Minister of Industry and Trade following Jozef Síkela's resignation. Shortly before taking office, Vlček stated that he considered the Greens Party agreement for Europe to be an opportunity for the Czech Republic.

== Personal life ==
Vlček lives in Pacov with his wife Hana and their two children.
