= Neven Mimica =

Croatian politician and diplomat

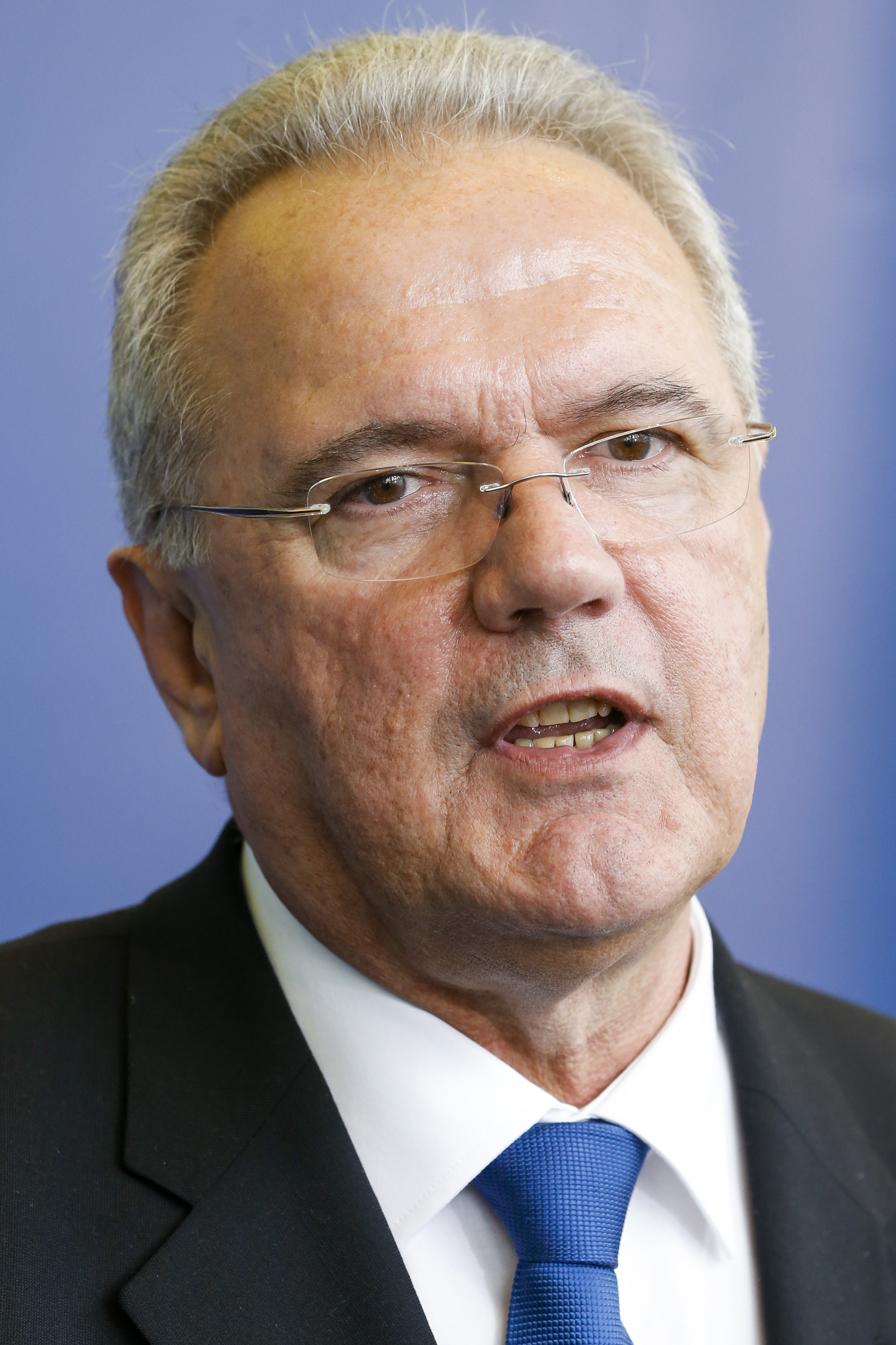
- Mimica in 2013

European Commissioner for International Cooperation and Development
- In office 1 November 2014 – 1 December 2019
- Commission: Juncker
- Preceded by: Kristalina Georgieva & Andris Piebalgs
- Succeeded by: Jutta Urpilainen (International Partnerships)

European Commissioner for Consumer Protection
- In office 1 July 2013 – 1 November 2014
- Commission: Barroso II
- Preceded by: Tonio Borg (Health and Consumer Policy)
- Succeeded by: Věra Jourová (Justice, Consumers and Gender Equality)

Deputy Prime Minister of Croatia
- In office 23 December 2011 – 1 July 2013
- Prime Minister: Zoran Milanović
- Preceded by: Darko Milinović
- Succeeded by: Ranko Ostojić

Minister of European Integration
- In office 28 September 2001 – 23 December 2003
- Prime Minister: Ivica Račan
- Preceded by: Ivan Jakovčić
- Succeeded by: Kolinda Grabar-Kitarović

Personal details
- Born: 12 October 1953 (age 72) Split, PR Croatia, FPR Yugoslavia (modern Croatia)
- Party: Social Democratic Party
- Education: University of Zagreb

Neven Mimica (pronounced [nêʋen mîmit͡sa]; born 12 October 1953) is a Croatian politician and diplomat who has been serving as European Commissioner for International Cooperation and Development in the Juncker Commission since 1 November 2014. He was previously the European Commissioner for Consumer Protection in the Second Barroso Commission from July 2013 until November 2014 and was in that regard the first European Union Commissioner from Croatia following its accession to the European Union.

Prior to his role in the European Union, Mimica also held a number of governmental posts in Croatia. Namely, he served as the 3rd Minister of European Integration from 2001 until 2003, in both the first and second cabinets of the Social Democratic Prime Minister Ivica Račan. Furthermore, he was appointed a Deputy Prime Minister in the cabinet of Zoran Milanović in 2011 and held the office until resigning to take up the post of European Union Commissioner in 2013.

== Early life and career ==
The son of primary-school teachers, Mimica graduated from the University of Zagreb Faculty of Economics in 1976. His first job was to handle agricultural exports for the Croatian company Astra.

Between 1979 and 1997 Mimica held positions in various governmental bodies related to foreign relations and foreign trade policies, including several counselling positions at embassies in Cairo and Ankara. In 1997 he was appointed assistant to the Croatian Minister of Economy and served as Croatia's chief negotiator during the country's accession to the World Trade Organization and the European Union Association Agreement; his counterpart at the European Commission was Catherine Day.

== Political career ==
In September 2001, Mimica became Minister of European Integration under Prime Minister Ivica Račan, position he held until December 2003.

=== Member of the Croatian Parliament, 2004–2013 ===
Mimica was elected to the Croatian Parliament in the 2003 elections as a representative of the Social Democratic Party, and again in 2007. From January 2008 he served as deputy speaker of the Croatian parliament and also as the chairman of the parliament's Committee for European Integration.

In addition to his parliamentary work, Mimica served as consultant to the Government of Kosovo on establishing European integration structures from 2005 until 2006.

=== Deputy Prime Minister, 2011–2013 ===
Ahead of the 2011 elections, SDP chairman Zoran Milanović assigned key preparatory work to Mimica, including the task of drafting public administration bills that later formed the basis of Milanovic's reform agenda. On 23 December 2011 he was selected as one of four deputy prime ministers in the government of Milanović, responsible for internal, foreign and European policy.

=== Member of the European Commission, 2013–2019 ===
On 1 July 2013 Mimica became European Commissioner for Consumer Protection in the European Commission. In this capacity, he was in charge of consumer markets, health technology and cosmetics, product and service safety, financial services and redress, and consumer strategy and enforcement. For the remainder of his time in office, he shepherded through the Council of Ministers and European Parliament draft legislation that had already been proposed. He also oversaw the implementation of existing legislation. László Andor was Acting Commissioner in his stead, from 19 April 2014 – 25 May 2014 while he was on electoral campaign leave for the 2014 elections to the European Parliament. He ultimately decided to not take up his seat.

From 1 November 2014 Mimica was European Commissioner for International Cooperation and Development in the European Commission led by Jean-Claude Juncker. In this capacity, he is part of the commission's foreign policy around Federica Mogherini.

Early in Mimica's tenure, the European Union approved 1.15 billion euros in aid for West Africa as part of the five-year European Development Fund program in 2015, nearly doubling its previous commitment to a region that is a major source of migrants seeking to enter Europe. In late 2015, he negotiated a 200 euro million aid agreement with Eritrea as part of the commission's efforts to reduce the flow from what was, at the time, the source of the third largest number of migrants. Since 2016, he has been working to implement the European Union's 44 billion euro Emergency Trust Fund for Africa which is aimed to entice private investors to some of the world's poorest nations and slow mass migration to Europe.

Also during Mimica's time in office, the European Union suspended direct financial support for the government of Burundi’s President Pierre Nkurunziza after concluding that it had not done enough to find a political solution to the 2015 post-election unrest in the country. The European Union funds about half the annual budget of Burundi and has imposed sanctions on officials close to the president.

In September 2016, Mimica was appointed by United Nations Secretary-General Ban Ki-moon to serve as member of the Lead Group of the Scaling Up Nutrition Movement.

Towards the end of his term, in 2019, Mimica pledged a total of 500 million euros in contributions of the EU to Global Fund to Fight AIDS, Tuberculosis and Malaria for the 2020–2022 period.

== Other activities ==
- Friends of the Global Fund, Member of the Board of Directors (since 2020)

Political offices
Preceded by Ivan Jakovčić	Minister of European Integration; 2001–2003	Succeeded by Kolinda Grabar-Kitarović
New office	Croatian European Commissioner; 2013–present	Succeeded by Dubravka Šuica; Nominee
Preceded by Tonio Borg as European Commissioner for Health and Consumer Policy	European Commissioner for Consumer Protection; 2013–2014	Succeeded by Věra Jourová as European Commissioner for Justice, Consumers and Gender Equality
Preceded by Kristalina Georgieva as European Commissioner for International Cooperation, Humanitarian Aid and Crisis Response	European Commissioner for International Cooperation and Development; 2014–present	Succeeded by TBD
Preceded by Andris Piebalgs as European Commissioner for Development	European Commissioner for International Cooperation and Development; 2014–present	Succeeded by TBD
