= Ben Zyskowicz =

Finnish politician (born 1954)

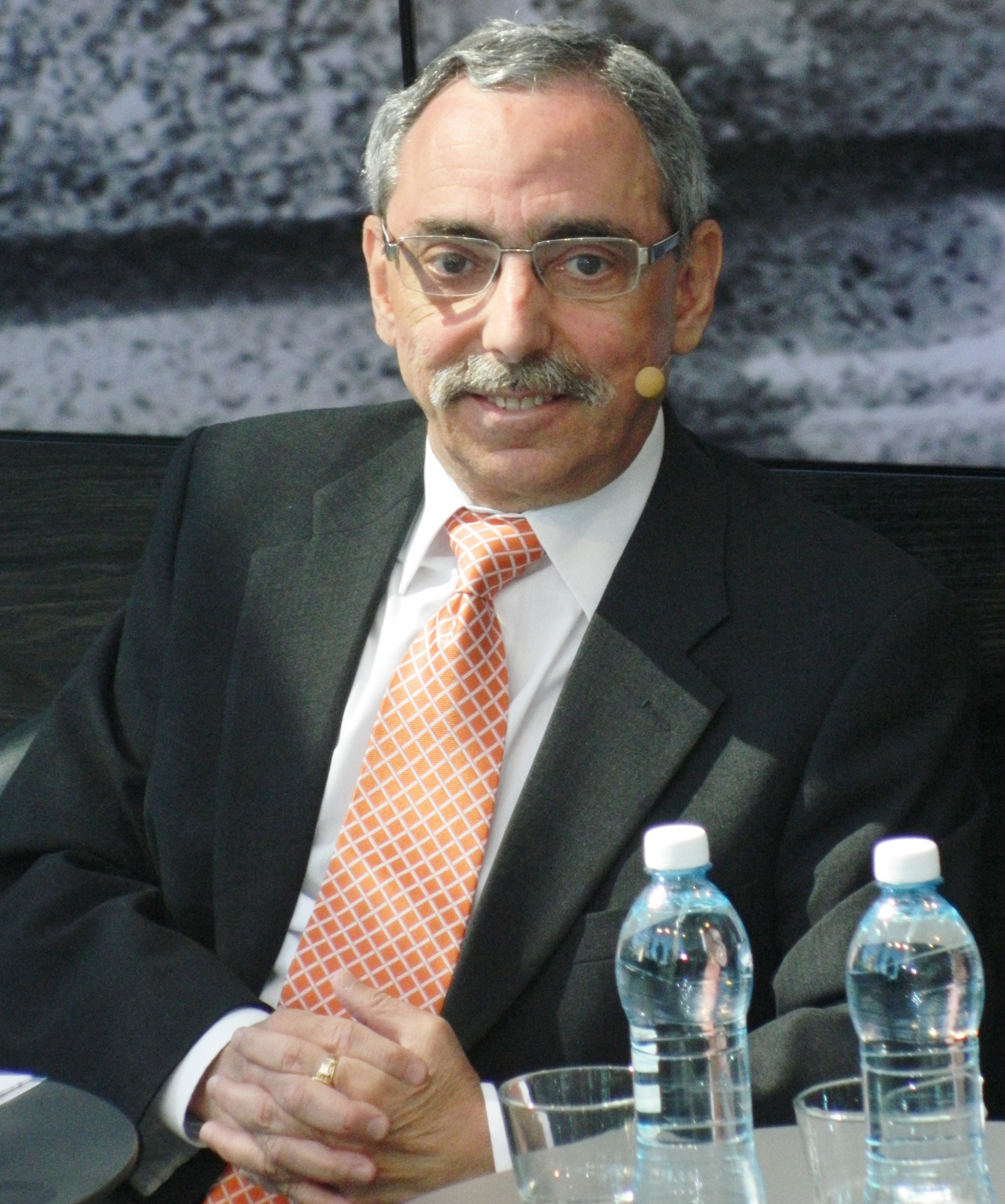
- Ben Zyskowicz (2017)

Member of the Finnish Parliament for Helsinki
- Incumbent
- Assumed office 24 March 1979

Speaker of the Parliament of Finland
- In office 27 April 2011 – 22 June 2011
- Preceded by: Sauli Niinistö
- Succeeded by: Eero Heinäluoma

Personal details
- Born: 24 May 1954 (age 72) Helsinki, Finland
- Citizenship: Poland (1954–1959); Finland (since 1959)
- Party: National Coalition Party
- Spouse: Rahime Husnetdin-Zyskowicz (m. 1982)
- Children: 2
- Relatives: Uniikki (nephew)
- Occupation: politician

Ben Berl Zyskowicz (born 24 May 1954) is a Finnish politician and member of parliament. Zyskowicz was chairman of the Finnish National Coalition Party's parliamentary group from 1993 to 2006, and has been a member of parliament for the National Coalition Party since 1979. He was the first Jew to be elected to the Finnish parliament. Following the parliamentary elections in April 2011, Zyskowicz was elected as the speaker of the parliament for the duration of negotiations over the governing coalition.

With over 47 years in office, Zyskowicz is the longest-serving member in the history of the Finnish Parliament, having held a seat continuously since 1979.

== Early life ==
Zyskowicz was born in Helsinki as the son of a Polish Jewish father, Abram Zyskowicz (1917–1960), who had been in the Sachsenhausen and Majdanek concentration camps and moved as a refugee to Sweden, where he met Ben's mother, Ester Fridman (1920–2002), a Finnish Jew.

Abram and Ester Zyskowicz's first child Carmela was born in 1952, and the family moved to Finland the following year. Ben Zyskowicz was born in the following year. Abram Zyskowicz drowned on a swimming trip when Ben was six years old.

Carmela and Ben had Polish citizenship until 1959 when they were naturalized as Finnish citizens. The Zyskowicz family spoke Swedish at home, and Ben spoke Finnish at the Jewish school he attended.

== Personal life ==
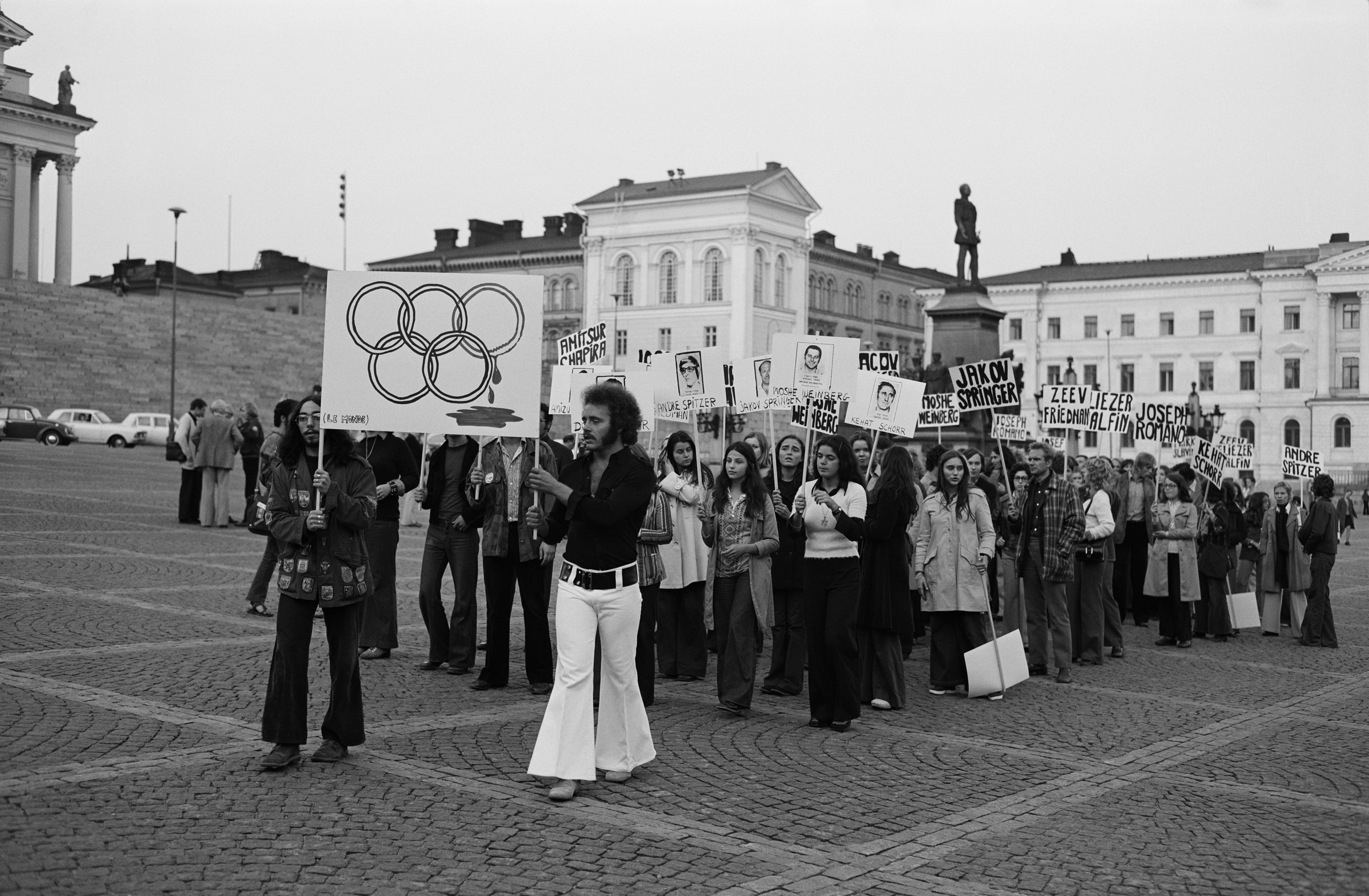
Ben Zyskowicz in 1972 (left), Demonstration procession at the Helsinki Senate Square

Ben Zyskowicz has been married to Rahime Husnetdin-Zyskowicz, a member of the Finnish Tatar community, since 1982 and has two daughters, Daniela (1983) and Dinah (1985). He is the maternal uncle of Finnish rapper Uniikki. Zyskowicz also abstains from alcohol and was known to be a regular at Café Strindberg which is a popular celebrity-spotting location on Pohjoisesplanadi in the Helsinki city centre.

== Career ==
Zyskowicz is renowned for being the Finnish politician with the most difficult name to spell. In 2002, Ilta-Sanomat reported that only 16.6% of Finns knew how to correctly spell his name. In 2011, he was elected as the acting speaker of the Finnish parliament. Despite spelling instructions for his name being sent by text message to elected members of parliament, two voting ballots were disqualified for misspelling his name.

Zyskowicz suffered a cerebral infarction on 29 July 2025. His return to the parliament was initially uncertain but he returned to parliamentary work in the following February announcing that the ongoing parliamentary season (2024-2027) will be his last.

Zyskowicz has stated that he has not sought minister positions due to his chronic migraine. In 2020, he said he has also started to suffer from depression. As an adolescent, he had undergone psychotherapy in order to cope with anxiousness and panic attacks.

Political offices
| Preceded by Sauli Niinistö | Speaker of the Parliament of Finland; 2011 | Succeeded by Eero Heinäluoma |
