= Jyrki Katainen =

Prime Minister of Finland from 2011 to 2014

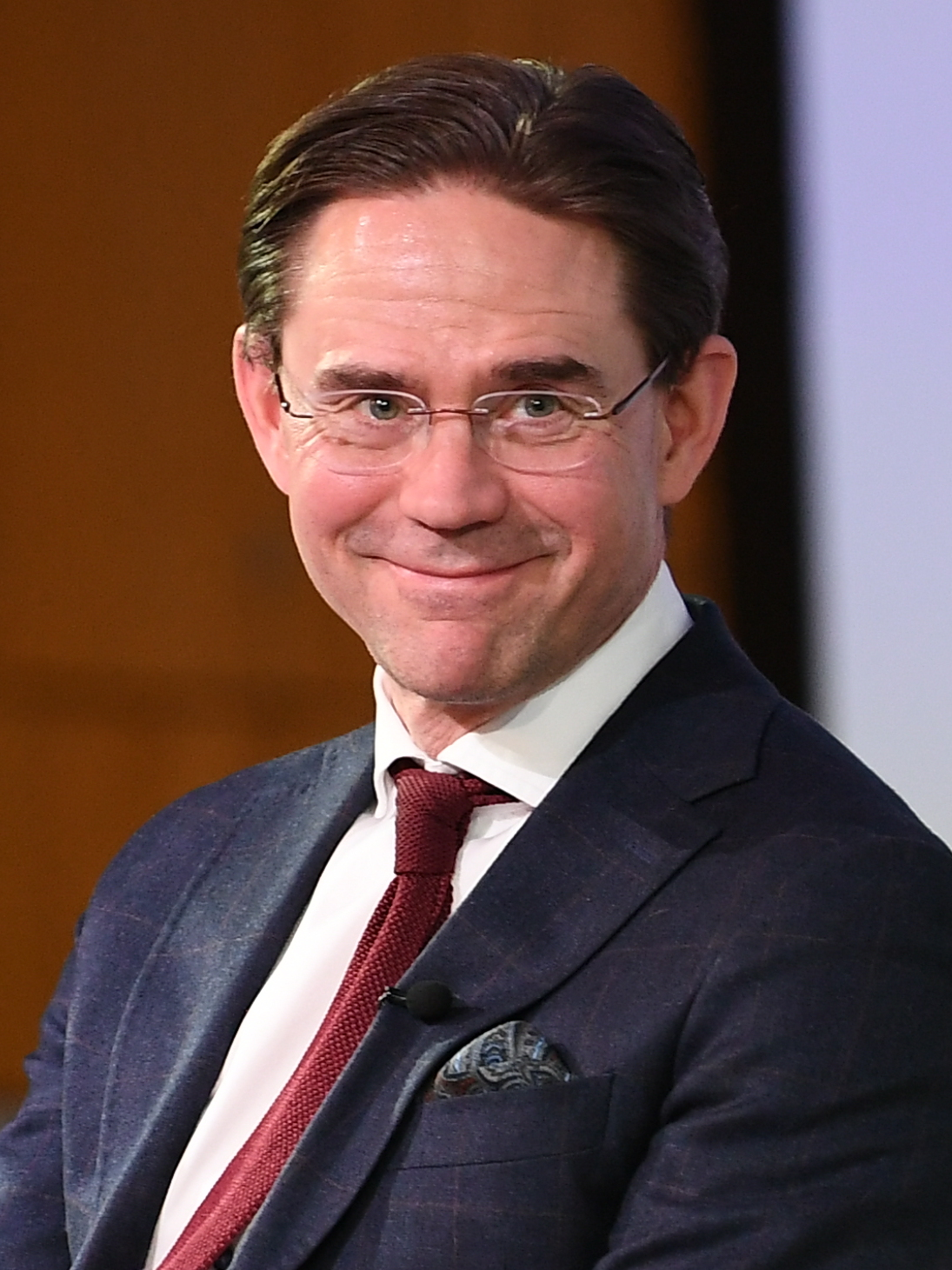
- Katainen in 2023

European Commissioner for Jobs, Growth, Investment and Competitiveness
- In office 1 November 2014 – 30 November 2019
- Commission: Juncker
- Preceded by: Ferdinando Nelli Feroci (Industry and Entrepreneurship)

European Commissioner for Economic and Monetary Affairs and the Euro
- In office 16 July 2014 – 1 November 2014
- Commission: Barroso II
- Preceded by: Siim Kallas (Acting)
- Succeeded by: Pierre Moscovici (Economic and Financial Affairs, Taxation and Customs); Valdis Dombrovskis (Euro and Social Dialogue)

42nd Prime Minister of Finland
- In office 22 June 2011 – 24 June 2014
- President: Tarja Halonen; Sauli Niinistö
- Deputy: Jutta Urpilainen; Antti Rinne
- Preceded by: Mari Kiviniemi
- Succeeded by: Alexander Stubb

Deputy Prime Minister of Finland
- In office 19 April 2007 – 22 June 2011
- Prime Minister: Matti Vanhanen; Mari Kiviniemi
- Preceded by: Eero Heinäluoma
- Succeeded by: Jutta Urpilainen

Minister of Finance
- In office 19 April 2007 – 22 June 2011
- Prime Minister: Matti Vanhanen; Mari Kiviniemi
- Preceded by: Eero Heinäluoma
- Succeeded by: Jutta Urpilainen

Personal details
- Born: Jyrki Tapani Katainen; 14 October 1971 (age 55) Siilinjärvi, North Savo, Finland
- Party: National Coalition Party
- Spouse: Mervi Kuittinen
- Children: 2
- Education: University of Tampere University of Leicester

Military service
- Allegiance: Finland
- Branch/service: Finnish Army
- Years of service: 1989–1990
- Rank: Senior 1st Lieutenant

Jyrki Tapani Katainen (born 14 October 1971) is a Finnish politician who served as the European Commission's Vice-President for Jobs, Growth, Investment and Competitiveness from 2014 until 2019. Katainen was previously prime minister of Finland from 2011 to 2014 and chairman of the National Coalition Party from 2004 to 2014. He was succeeded by Alexander Stubb as chairman of Finland's National Coalition Party. After stepping down as prime minister, Katainen was elected as European Commission Vice-President in July 2014.

== Education and personal life ==
Katainen was born in Siilinjärvi, a town in Finland. He graduated from Siilinjärvi Senior High School in 1990. He obtained a Master's degree in political science from the University of Tampere, spending one year at the University of Leicester as an Erasmus exchange student.

Jyrki Katainen has two children: Saara (born in 2005) and Veera (2009). In addition to Finnish, Katainen speaks English, French and Swedish. Katainen is an accomplished chef.

== Political career prior to 2011 ==
Katainen became involved in politics after a brief career in teaching. He was a member of the Siilinjärvi municipal council in his first political position, in 1993. He was elected member of the Finnish Parliament (Eduskunta) from the district of North Savo in 1999, served as the vice-chairman of the party in 2001, and became the leader in 2004.

From 1990 to 2000, Katainen was vice president of the Youth of the European Peoples Party.

Katainen was elected vice president of the European People's Party (EPP) for a three-year term in 2006 and won the second election in 2009.

In the 2007 parliamentary election, Katainen's National Coalition was placed second. Katainen became the Minister of Finance and Deputy Prime Minister in the new cabinet with the Center, the National Coalition, Greens, and the Swedish People's party.

As the Finance Minister, Katainen noted that Europe's leaders must do more to prepare voters for “exit strategies” and noted that "it is politically difficult but we have no choice. We have to do painful things in the coming years when economies begin to recover."

== Prime Minister (2011–2014) ==
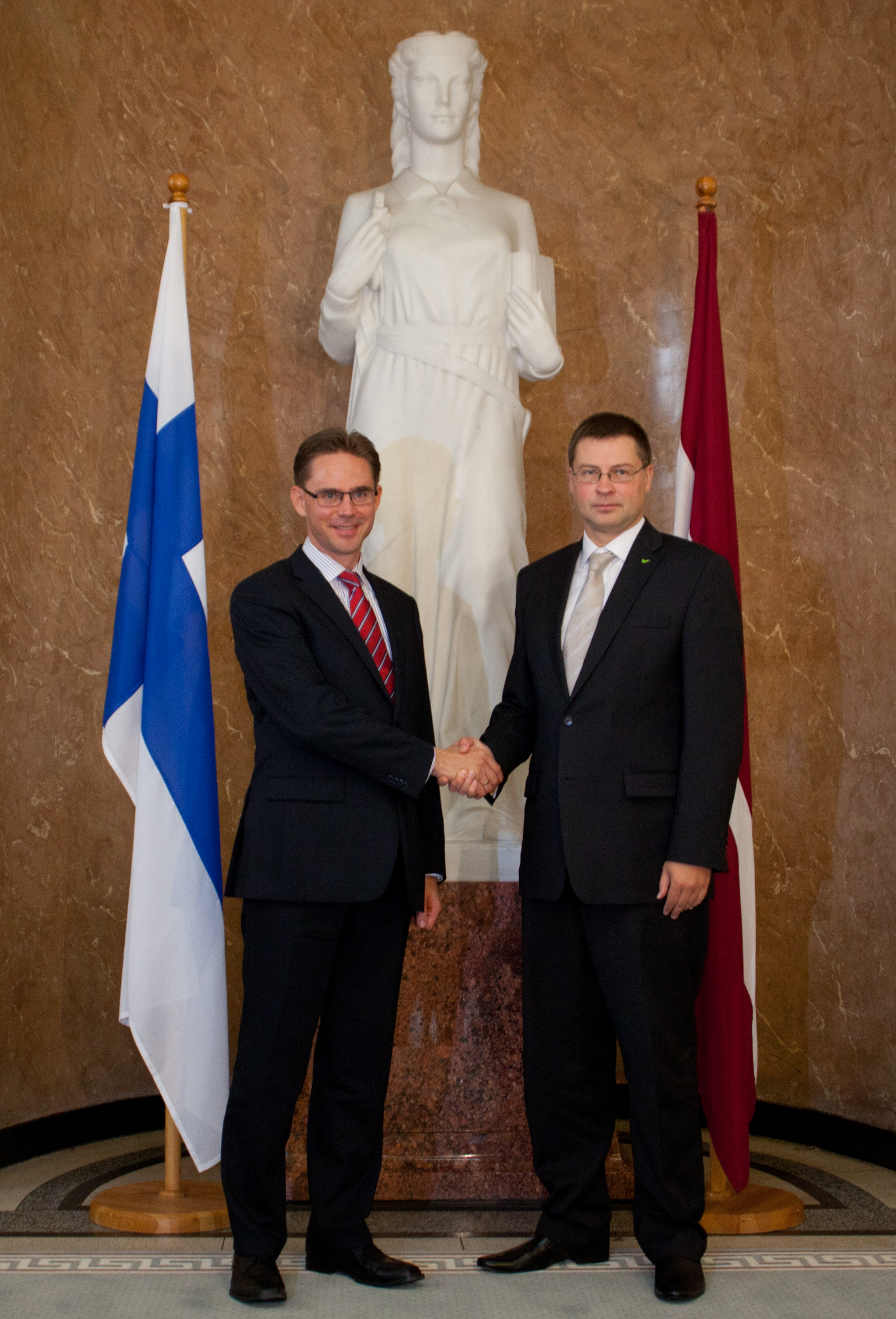
Katainen and Latvian Prime Minister Valdis Dombrovskis on 16 September 2011

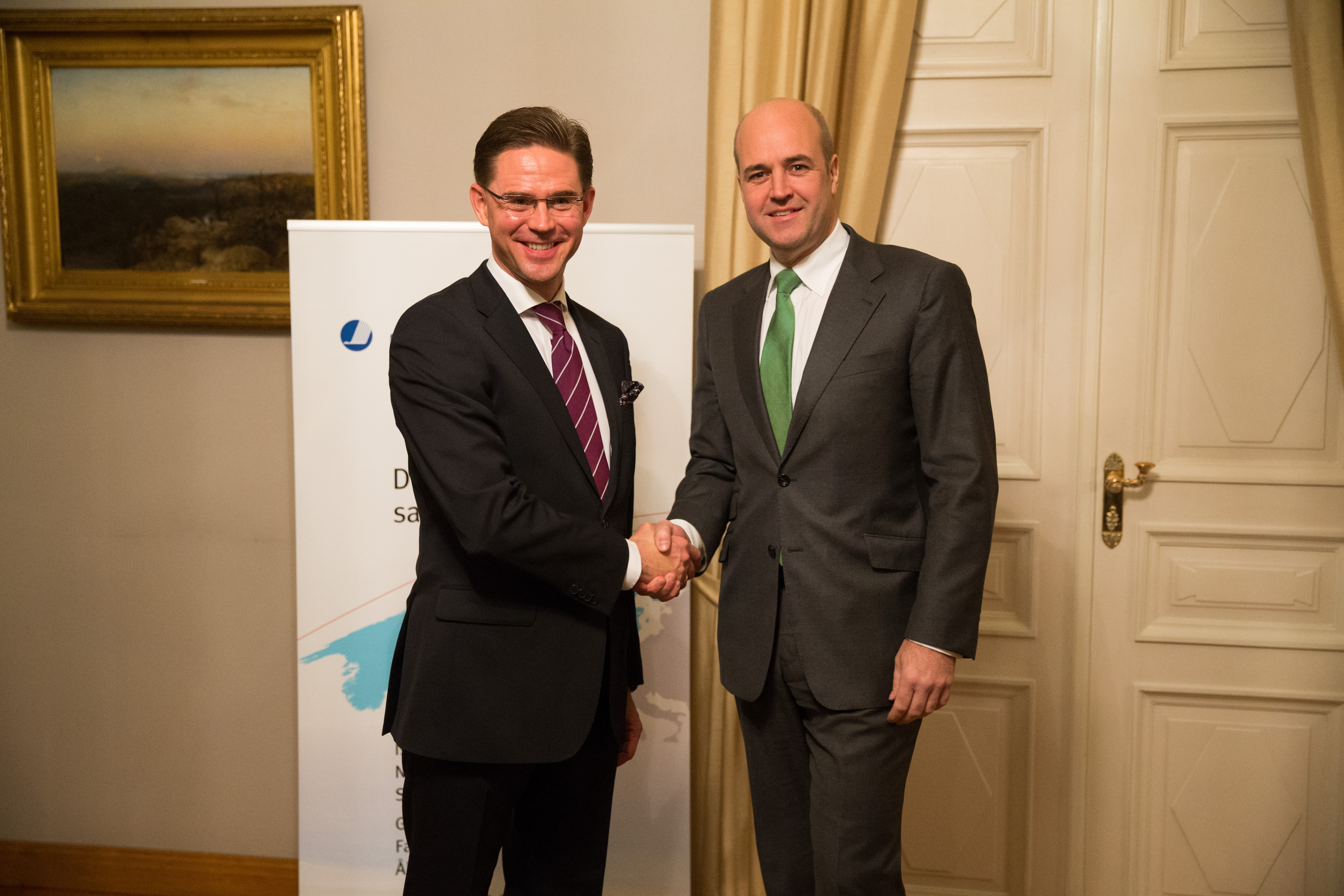
Katainen and Swedish Prime Minister Fredrik Reinfeldt on 29 October 2012

Following the parliamentary election held on 17 April 2011, Katainen was elected Prime Minister by the new parliament and assumed office on 22 June 2011. His centre-right National Coalition Party became the largest party for the first time in the history of Finland. Following government-forming negotiations, Katainen was elected Prime Minister by the Finnish Parliament, and his government of six parties (National Coalition Party, Social Democratic Party of Finland, Left Alliance (Finland), Green League, Swedish People's Party of Finland and Christian Democrats (Finland) ) was formally appointed by President Tarja Halonen on 22 June 2011.

In August 2013 Katainen invited participants representing political parties, interest groups and research institutes to a forum in Heureka science center. The forum was designed to explore the broad structural changes needed to improve Finland's economy over the coming years. In his speech (loosely translated to English) Prime Minister Katainen concluded that 'participants showed curiousness and commitment. I believe the discussions will provide an excellent basis for resolving difficult situations. We now need to take action and to address the structural reforms ahead.'

Finland's economic problems were apparent for many, but the government was forced to delay structural reforms because socialist parties in the six-party cabinet were opposed to the new measures. In September 2013 the six-party cabinet laid out plans for reform. However, Katainen warned that the reforms were not sufficient. In November 2012, the government elected not to have Finland to join the team of EU countries that proposed a financial transaction tax. This was a reportedly difficult issue for the six-party government because three of the parties favored the tax.

Katainen's views regarding the demise of Nokia may have been controversial in the international arena, however, the company has long been part of Finland's national fabric, making it difficult to view the issue from alternative perspectives.

As Prime Minister, Katainen encouraged investment in Finland, in part because of the country's excellent education system and political stability. He also encouraged the involvement of universities and higher education institutions in civil society in order to increase the country's competitiveness in the national arena.

According to Katainen's blog there was hope in the future for Finland's economy. For example, he highlighted Google’s investment of about 800 million Euros in Hamina, Russian data center Yandex’s investment in Mäntsälä and Microsoft’s plans for investing about 250 million in Finland. But he noted that Finland was still losing more jobs than those that were being created.

In November 2013, Katainen said "Finland needs more direct foreign investment to accelerate the economy and increase growth and employment. The government approved the strategy for attracting national investment last December. The strategy emphasis the ICT sector, including data centres, as a core area."

=== European Union ===
In his position as Prime Minister, Katainen recommended that European leaders rebuild the unity of the European Union because it was undermined by the euro zone debt crisis. Speaking at a Reuters Euro Zone Summit, he noted that mutual resentment between citizens of the northern creditor states and poorer debtor countries may have fuelled euroscepticism and perhaps this may have posed a threat to the 28-nation bloc's unity.

Katainen said calls for more European involvement were unpopular at a time when globalization had made people afraid of losing their jobs and lowering their standard of living.

The enforcement of overhauled budget discipline rules and the creation of a banking union with a single supervisor and a mechanism to wind up failed banks without making taxpayers pay had achieved the main changes needed to stabilize the euro zone.

Asked whether the EU treaty should be changed in the next five years after European Parliament elections in May, Katainen said he was a pragmatist and most of what Europe needed could be achieved by strengthening and extending its internal market.

According to Katainen, the key reforms to pensions, labor markets and education needed to keep European countries competitive with the rest of the world and make its social model affordable were in the hands of national governments.

Katainen called for a single market in clean technology, noting that Finland was producing third-generation non-food biofuels that could not enter some EU countries because regulation had not kept pace with innovation.

To combat eurosceptics in the pan-European election, EU leaders should address issues that are important to voters who support populist political parties.

Regarding the recent situation in Ukraine Katainen noted that Finland would not enforce economic sanctions against Russia. He recommended that leaders and citizens remain level headed regarding the situation in Crimea. According to the Prime Minister, sanctions against Russia may negatively impact the Finnish economy.

== Vice-President of the European Commission ==
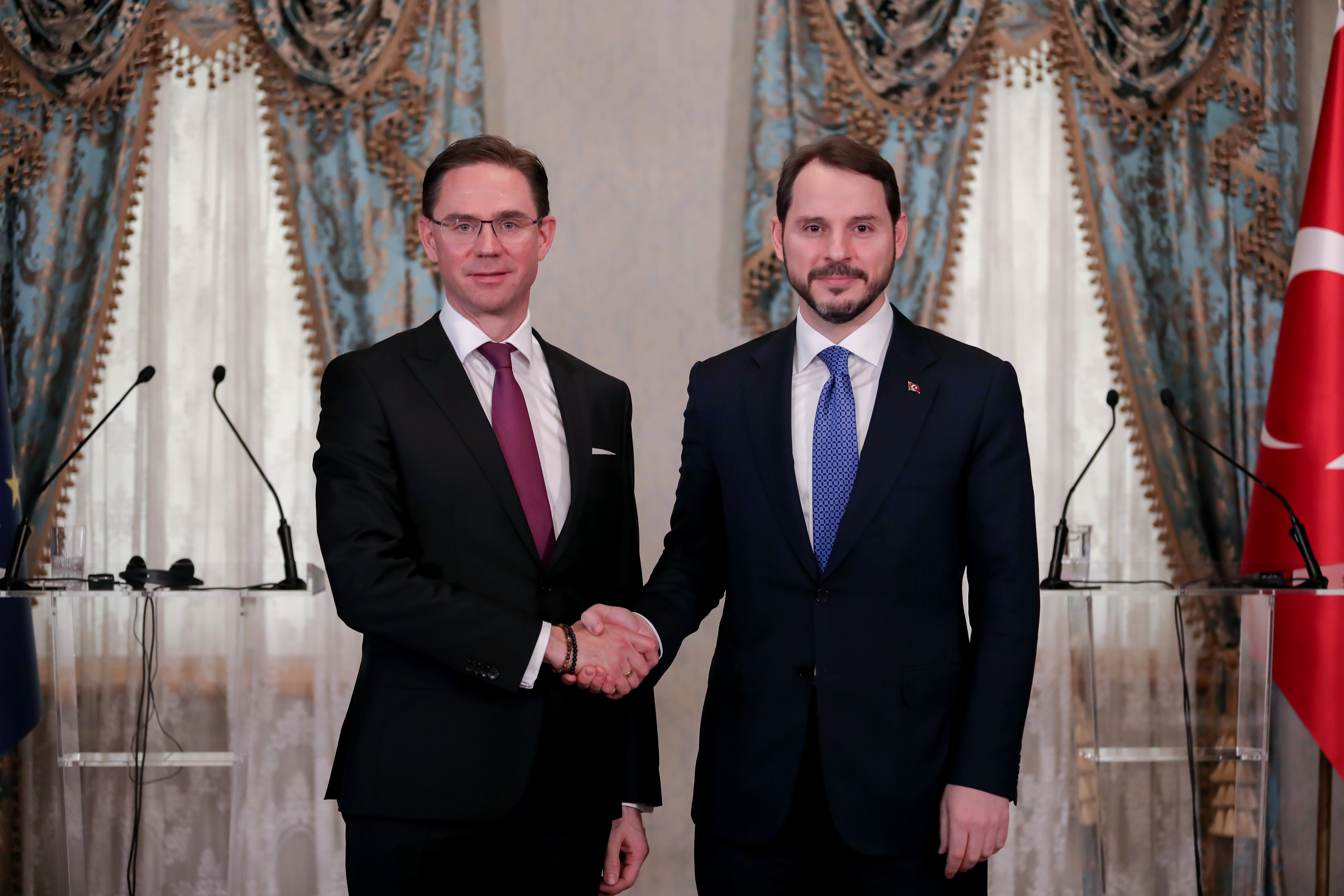
Katainen with Turkish Treasury and Finance Minister Berat Albayrak in Istanbul, 28 February 2019

Katainen resigned as the chairman of Finland's National Coalition Party and as the Finnish prime minister in June 2014 and was elected as European Commissioner on 16 July 2014. He was later confirmed as vice-president-designate for jobs, growth, investment and competitiveness in the European Commission. Katainen's new responsibilities as vice-president are to formulate recommendations to ensure that member states' economies are on a path of sustainable of growth and job creation, to supervise the Union's common currency (the euro) and to produce the commission's regular economic forecasts and economic indicators.

According to Swedish social democrat Marita Ulvskog, "Katainen's strength is that he comes from a Nordic country, and he understands the importance of strong social partners in the labor market. We cannot solve the (Euro) crisis without social dialogue, and he understands this." Katainen has been assigned the task of finding €300 billion to invest in the growth and economy of the European Union.

In a 2015 interview, the former prime minister of Finland quickly pointed out that "investment is truly a golden thread that weaves together everything that we do – we need to invest in our people, in our partnerships and in our planet". This means not only "giving people the skills they need for the 21st century economy", but also promoting "mobility inside and outside the union, in a way that supports economic growth and social cohesion, protects against external threats and contributes to international development".

Ahead of the 2019 European Parliament election, Katainen was named among potential spitzenkandidats for the European People's Party. However, in June 2018, Katainen announced that he was not seeking candidacy and instead was going to leave politics after the end of his term in the commission.

== Life after politics ==
After leaving politics, Katainen was appointed president of SITRA for a term of five years. In June 2023, Katainen was named head of the financial group Nordea's public affairs unit.

== Other activities ==
- European Bank for Reconstruction and Development (EBRD), Ex-Officio Member of the Board of Governors (2007–2011; since 2014)

== Cabinets ==
- Katainen Cabinet

Party political offices
Preceded by Ville Itälä	Leader of the National Coalition Party; 2004–2014	Succeeded by Alexander Stubb
Political offices
Preceded by Eero Heinäluoma	Deputy Prime Minister of Finland; 2007–2011	Succeeded by Jutta Urpilainen
Preceded by Eero Heinäluoma	Minister of Finance; 2007–2011	Succeeded by Jutta Urpilainen
Preceded by Mari Kiviniemi	Prime Minister of Finland; 2011–2014	Succeeded by Alexander Stubb
Preceded by Olli Rehn	Finnish European Commissioner; 2014–present	Succeeded by Jutta Urpilainen; Nominee
Preceded by Siim Kallas; Acting	European Commissioner for Economic and Monetary Affairs and the Euro; 2014	Succeeded by Pierre Moscovici as European Commissioner for Economic and Financial Affairs, Taxation and Customs
Preceded by Siim Kallas; Acting	European Commissioner for Economic and Monetary Affairs and the Euro; 2014	Succeeded by Valdis Dombrovskis as European Commissioner for the Euro and Social Dialogue
Preceded by Ferdinando Nelli Feroci as European Commissioner for Industry and Entrepreneurship	European Commissioner for Jobs, Growth, Investment and Competitiveness; 2014–present	Incumbent
