= Jutta Urpilainen =

Finnish politician (born 1975)

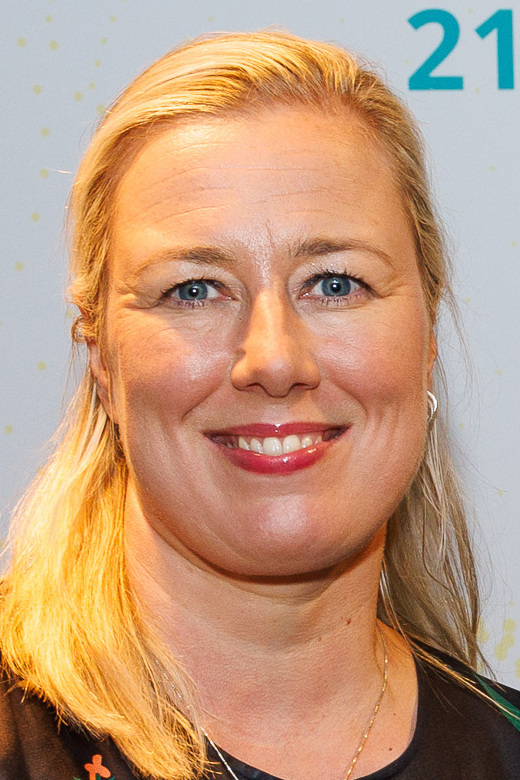
- Urpilainen in 2022

European Commissioner for International Partnerships
- In office 1 December 2019 – 1 December 2024; On leave: 2 December 2023 – 28 January 2024*
- Commission: Von der Leyen I
- Preceded by: Neven Mimica
- Succeeded by: Jozef Síkela

Deputy Prime Minister of Finland
- In office 22 June 2011 – 6 June 2014
- Prime Minister: Jyrki Katainen
- Preceded by: Jyrki Katainen
- Succeeded by: Antti Rinne

Minister of Finance
- In office 22 June 2011 – 6 June 2014
- Prime Minister: Jyrki Katainen
- Preceded by: Jyrki Katainen
- Succeeded by: Antti Rinne

Leader of the Social Democratic Party
- In office 6 June 2008 – 9 May 2014
- Preceded by: Eero Heinäluoma
- Succeeded by: Antti Rinne

Member of the Parliament of Finland
- In office 19 March 2003 – 30 November 2019
- Constituency: Vaasa

Personal details
- Born: 4 August 1975 (age 51) Lapua, Finland
- Party: Social Democratic Party
- Other political affiliations: Party of European Socialists
- Spouse: Juha Mustonen
- Children: 2
- Education: University of Jyväskylä
- Website: Official website
- *Margaritis Schinas served as acting commissioner during Urpilainen's leave.

Jutta Pauliina Urpilainen (born 4 August 1975) is a Finnish politician. She was the first female chair of the Social Democratic Party of Finland, which she led from 2008 to 2014. She was the Minister of Finance as well as the Deputy Prime Minister of Finland from 2011 to 2014. Between 2019 and 2024, she served as the European Commissioner for International Partnerships in the first von der Leyen Commission. Urpilainen was a candidate in the 2024 election for President of Finland, receiving 4.3% of the vote.

== Early life and education ==
Born in Lapua, Southern Ostrobothnia, Urpilainen is the daughter of former politician Kari Urpilainen. She studied at the University of Jyväskylä, where she graduated with a Master's of Education in 2002. During her undergraduate studies, she spent an Erasmus year in Vienna. She worked as a school teacher until her election to Parliament.

== Political career ==
=== Early beginnings ===
Urpilainen served as president of the Young European Federalists of Finland in 2001. She joined the Kokkola city in 2001.

=== Member of Parliament and party leadership ===
Urpilainen was a member of Parliament for the Vaasa constituency from the 2003 national elections. In parliament, she was a member of the Committee on Education and Culture and a deputy member of the Finance Committee. In addition to her parliamentary work, she was also a member of the Advisory Council of the Finnish Institute of International Affairs.

Urpilainen was elected as the chair of the Social Democratic Party in June 2008, succeeding former Deputy Prime Minister and Minister of Finance Eero Heinäluoma. She won on the second ballot, defeating former Minister for Foreign Affairs Erkki Tuomioja by 218 votes to 132. During her tenure from 2008 until 2014, support for the Social Democrats fell from 21 to 15.5 percent. However, in the 2011 elections, she returned the party to government after four years.

=== Minister of Finance ===
After the 2011 parliamentary election, in which the SDP became the second-largest party, Urpilainen was appointed Minister of Finance and Deputy Prime Minister in the cabinet led by Jyrki Katainen. In this capacity, she also chaired the meetings of the Nordic Council Ministers of Finance in 2012.

The surge of the eurosceptic True Finns party in the 2011 elections sparked a move from the Social Democrats under Urpilainen to toughen their stance on the euro significantly, leading Finland to become the only country to demand collateral from Greece and Spain as part of their international rescues. On 6 July 2012, Urpilainen said the following on her website: "Finland would prefer to consider leaving the Eurozone rather than to pay other countries' debts in the currency area." International news media, such as The Daily Telegraph, misinterpreted the statement as a threat that Finland would leave the eurozone. Urpilainen's assistant Matti Hirvola later clarified her statements and that she had meant that Finland did not wish to be responsible for paying other countries' debt deposits. Only one month later, Urpilainen had to revise the government's growth target for that fiscal year down to zero as exports slowed; the only Eurozone countries that fared worse were Greece and Portugal.

Urpilainen sought another term as party chair in the Social Democratic Party's 2014 party conference in May. She was narrowly defeated by her challenger, Antti Rinne, in a 257 to 243 vote. Urpilainen subsequently stepped down as the Minister of Finance in June.

Ahead of the 2018 presidential elections, Urpilainen was widely mentioned as a potential candidate. By February 2017, she announced she would not seek the presidency.

From 2017 until 2019, Urpilainen served as Minister of Foreign Affairs Timo Soini’s Special Representative on Mediation.

=== European Commissioner ===
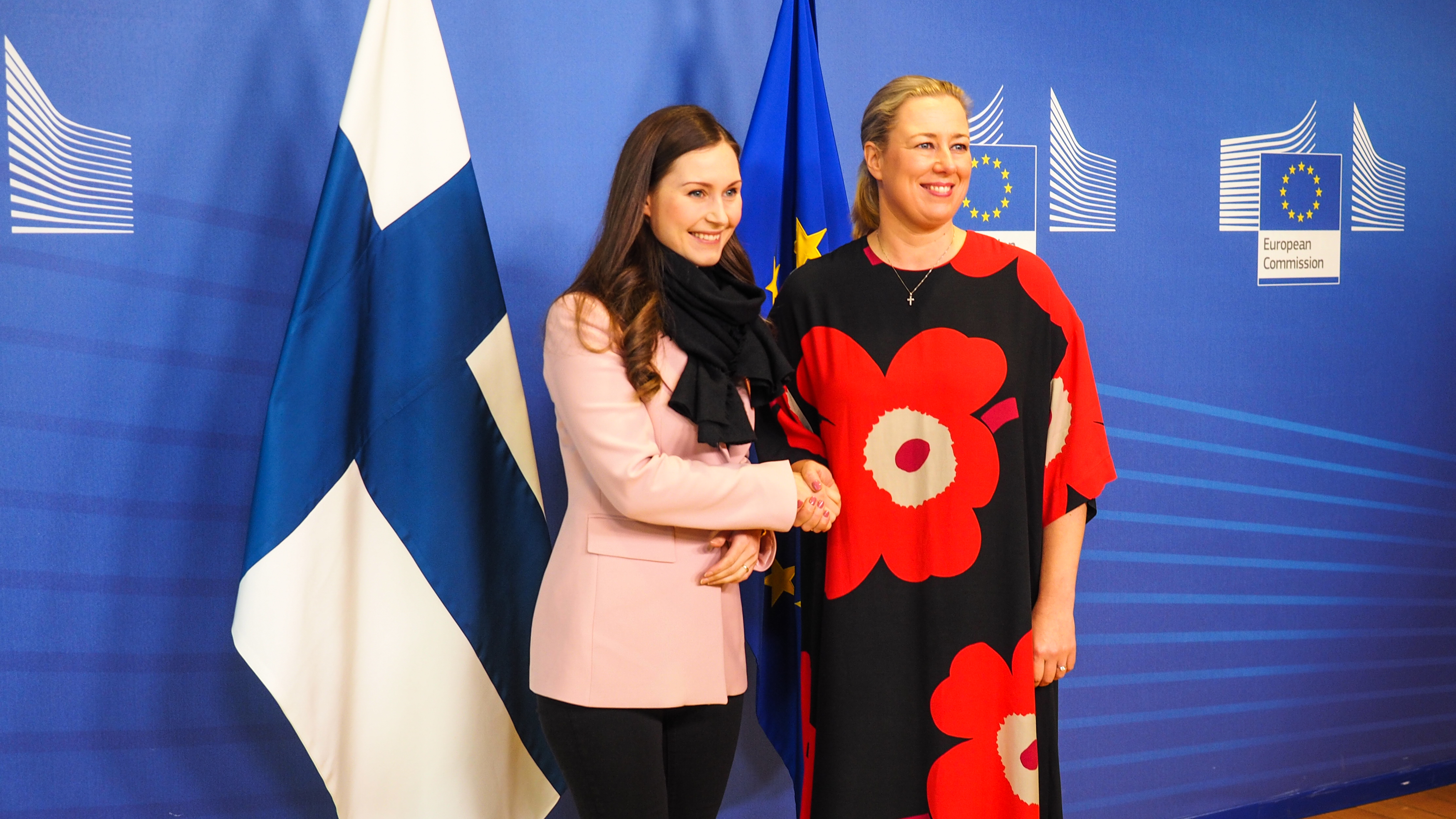
Urpilainen and Finnish Prime Minister Sanna Marin on 6 February 2020

On 1 December 2019, Urpilainen assumed the office of European Commissioner in the Von der Leyen Commission, with the portfolio of international partnerships.

In 2023, United Nations Secretary-General António Guterres appointed Urpilainen as one of 22 members of the Scaling Up Nutrition (SUN) Movement's lead group. Also since 2023, she has also been a member of the United Nations High-level Panel on the Teaching Profession, co-chaired by Kersti Kaljulaid and Paula-Mae Weekes.

On 16 August 2023, the chairman of the Social Democratic Party Sanna Marin asked Urpilainen to run in the 2024 Finnish presidential election as the party's candidate. After months of consideration, Urpilainen announced her candidacy in November 2023. In the election, she received 4.34% of the total vote count and failed to advance to the second round of voting.

== Other activities ==
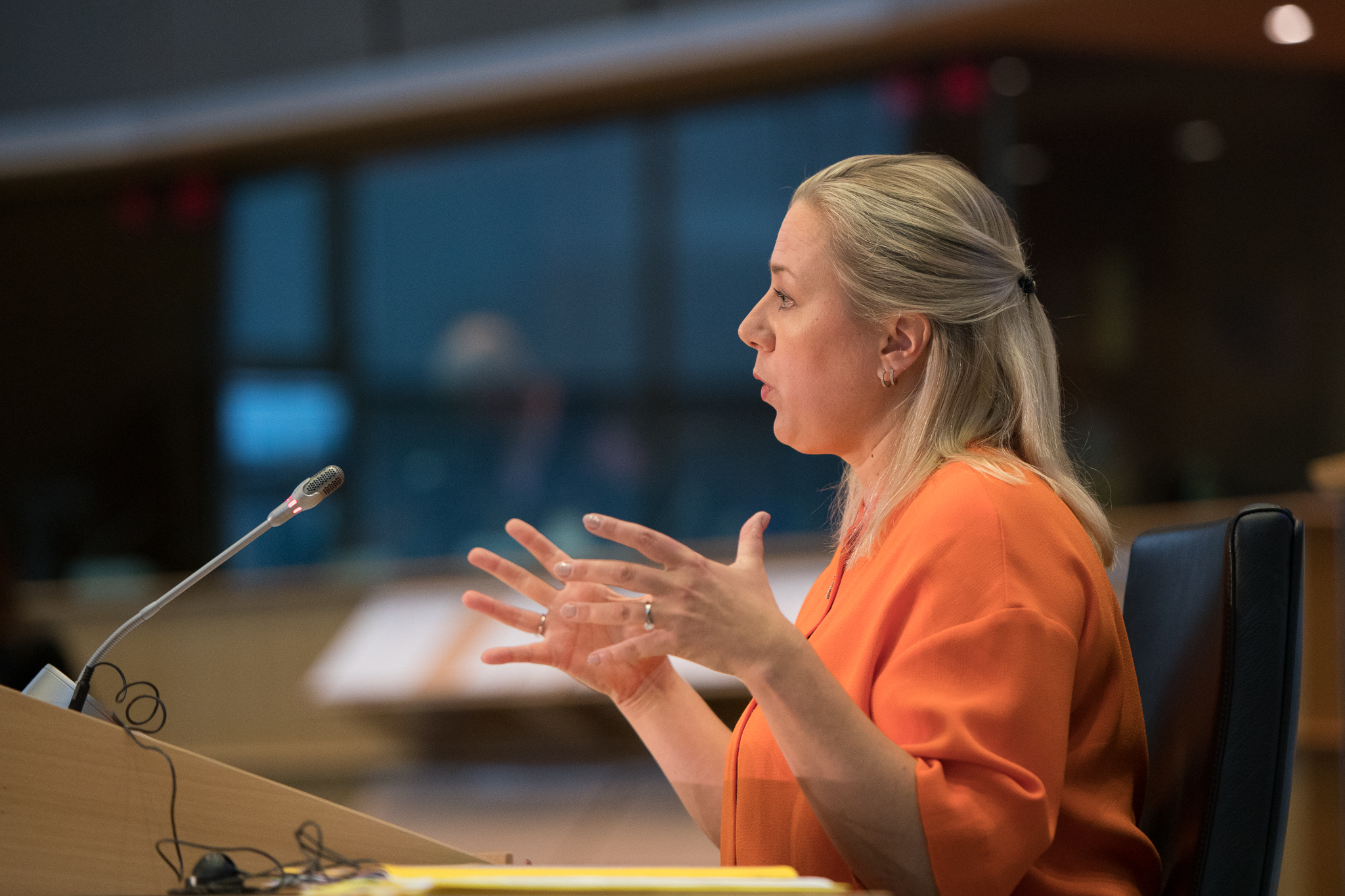
Urpilainen testifies before the European Parliament in 2019 during hearings to confirm her appointment to the European Commission

=== European Union organizations ===
- European Investment Bank (EIB), Ex-Officio Member of the Board of Governors (2011–2014)
- European Stability Mechanism (ESM), Member of the Board of Governors (2012–2014)

=== International organizations ===
- Joint World Bank-IMF Development Committee, Member (2013–2014)
- European Bank for Reconstruction and Development (EBRD), Ex-Officio Member of the Board of Governors (2011–2014)
- Nordic Investment Bank (NIB), Ex-Officio Member of the Board of Governors (2011–2014)
- Multilateral Investment Guarantee Agency (MIGA), World Bank Group, Ex-Officio Member of the Board of Governors (2011–2014)
- World Bank, Ex-Officio Member of the Board of Governors (2011–2014)

=== Corporate boards ===
- Veikkaus, Member of the Board of Directors (2017–2018)

=== Non-profit organizations ===
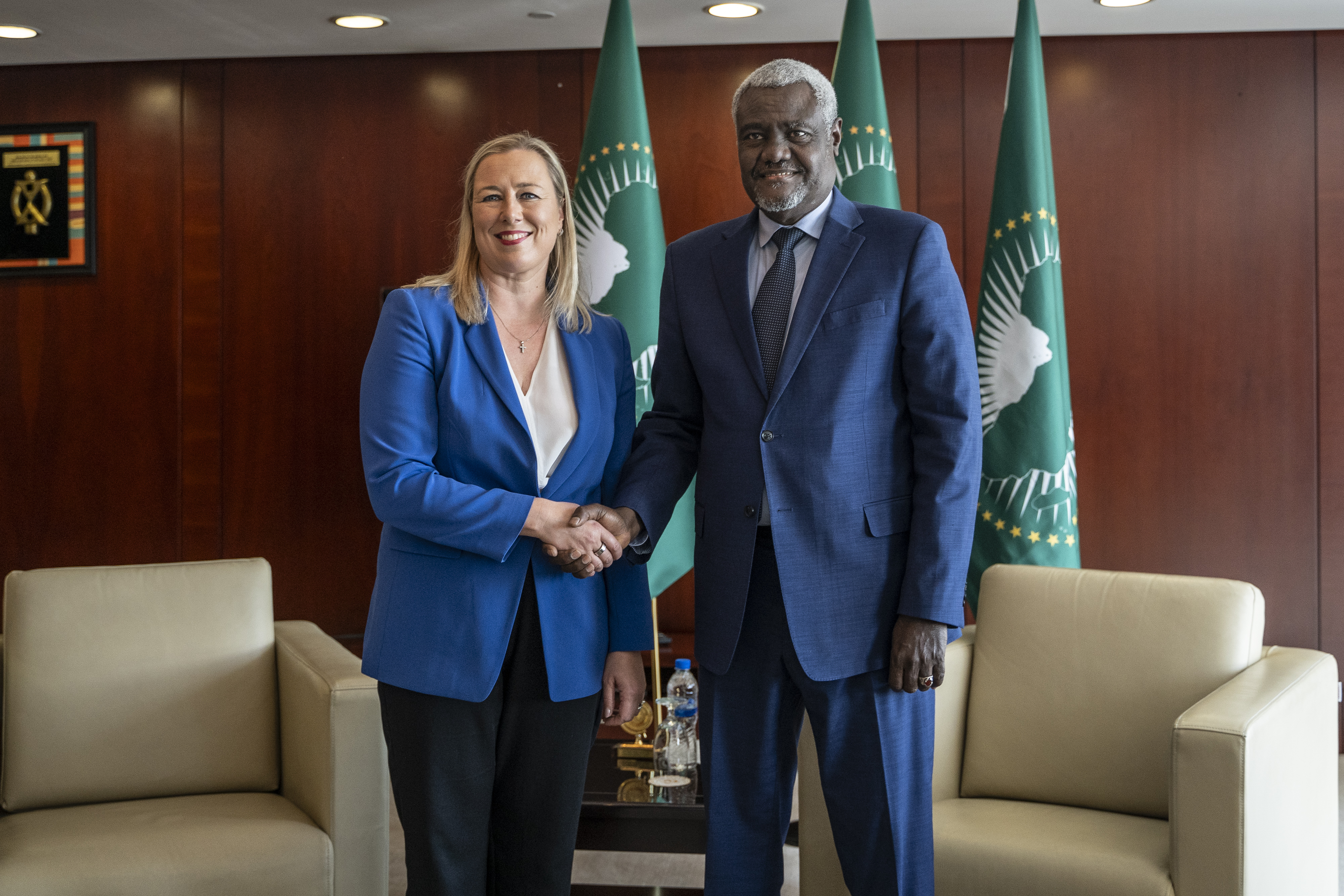
Jutta Urpilainen with Moussa Faki Mahamat African Union Commission Chairperson in Addis Ababa, Ethiopia, on October 03, 2023.

- European Leadership Network (ELN), Member (since 2025)
- European Council on Foreign Relations (ECFR), Member of the Council (since 2023)
- Crisis Management Initiative (CMI), Member of the Board (since 2019)
- Finnish National Opera Foundation, Member of the Board (2017–2018)
- Finnish Innovation Fund (SITRA), Member of the Supervisory Board (2017–2018)
- Finnish National Commission for UNESCO, Chair (2015–2018)

== Personal life ==
Urpilainen is married to Juha Mustonen, an official in the Finnish Ministry for Foreign Affairs. In 2017 and 2019, they adopted two children from Colombia.

In 2002, Urpilainen recorded a Christmas album called “Christmassy thoughts” featuring versions of “Winter Wonderland” and “Jingle Bells.”

Party political offices
Preceded by Eero Heinäluoma	Leader of the Social Democratic Party; 2008–2014	Succeeded by Antti Rinne
Political offices
Preceded by Jyrki Katainen	Deputy Prime Minister of Finland; 2011–2014	Succeeded by Antti Rinne
Preceded by Jyrki Katainen	Minister of Finance; 2011–2014	Succeeded by Antti Rinne
Preceded by Jyrki Katainen	Finnish European Commissioner; 2019–	Incumbent
