= European Commissioner for International Partnerships =

Member of the EU Commission

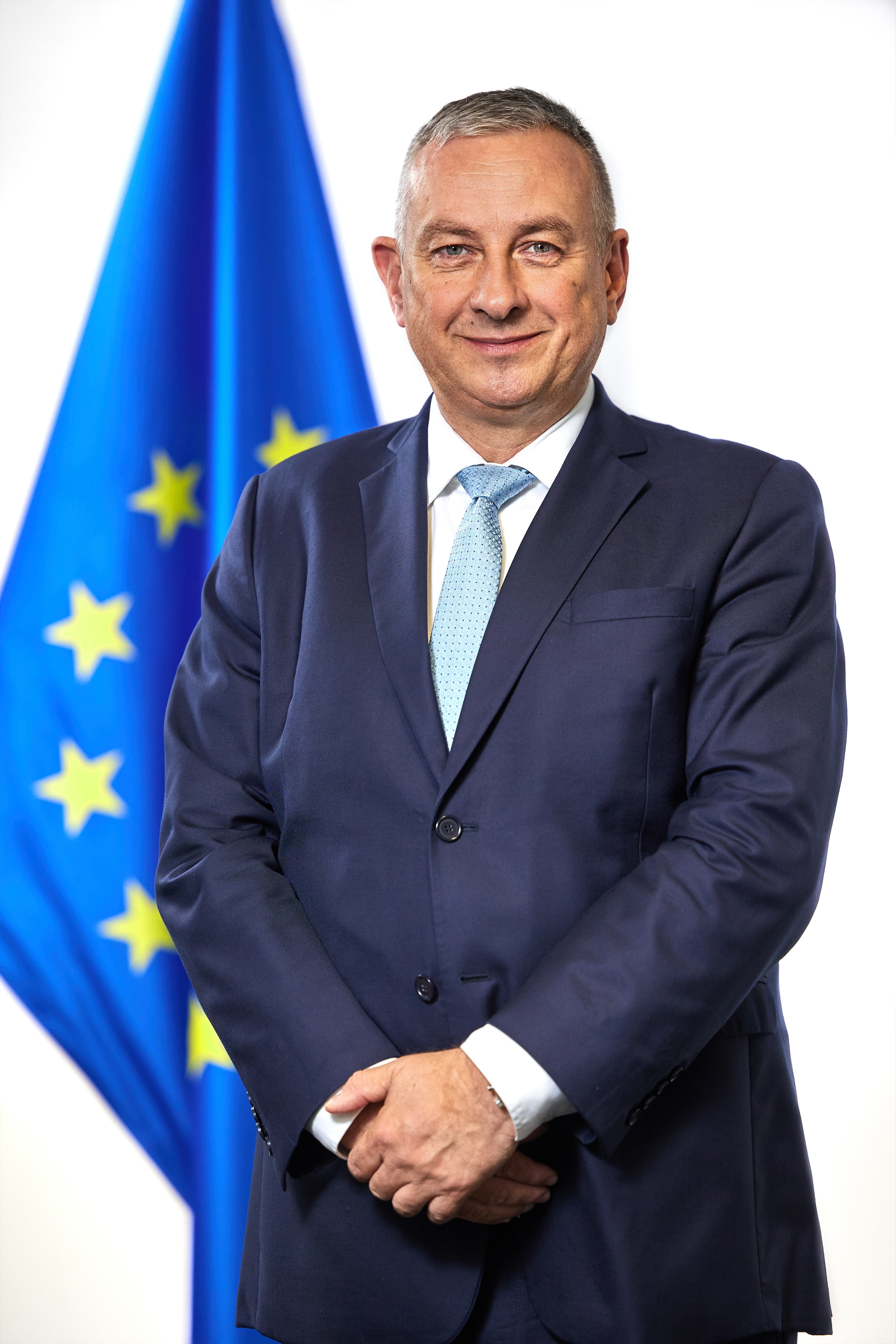
- Incumbent; Jozef Síkela since 1 December 2024
- Residence: Rue de la Loi 200, 1040 Brussels, Belgium
- Nominator: Member state
- Appointer: Commission President and confirmed by the European Parliament
- Formation: 2014
- Website: Official website

The European Commissioner for International Partnerships formerly European Commissioner for International Cooperation and Development is the member of the European Commission responsible for overseeing the international cooperation and development policy of the European Union, and for heading the Directorate-General for International Partnerships (DG INTPA).

The current Commissioner is Jozef Síkela of the Czech Republic, serving since 1 December 2024.

== Responsibilities ==
Commissioner for International Partnerships has to focus on the following:

The main objective will be to ensure the European model of development evolves in line with new global realities. It should be strategic and effective, should create value for money and should contribute to wider political priorities. - Building on the current EU–Africa Sustainable Alliance, Prepare a new comprehensive strategy for Africa

- Conclude the negotiations for a Post-Cotonou agreement with the countries from the African, Caribbean and Pacific Group of States. - Reach comprehensive partnerships with countries of migration origin and transit

- Ensure that the Europe's external financial assistance 2030 Agenda for Sustainable Development and the Sustainable Development Goals within it

- Ensure that gender equality and the empowerment of women and girls continue to be a top priority in our international cooperation and development policies.

- A dedicated focus on supporting civil society around the world. We should ensure they have a far greater role in designing and implementing European policies, programs and projects.

- Work with other Commissioners to facilitate a swift agreement on the post-2020 Neighborhood, Development and International Cooperation Instrument

Directorate-General for Development and Cooperation (DG DEVCO) has to report to Commissioner for International Cooperation and Development, which helps Commissioner to fulfil his responsibilities.

== List of commissioners ==
#	Name	Country	Period	Commission
1	Neven Mimica	Croatia	2014–2019	Juncker Commission
2	Jutta Urpilainen	Finland	2019–2024	Von der Leyen Commission
3	Jozef Síkela	Czech Republic	2024–present	Von der Leyen Commission II
