= Juncker Commission =

European Commission from 2014 to 2019

- 6th Commission of the European Union

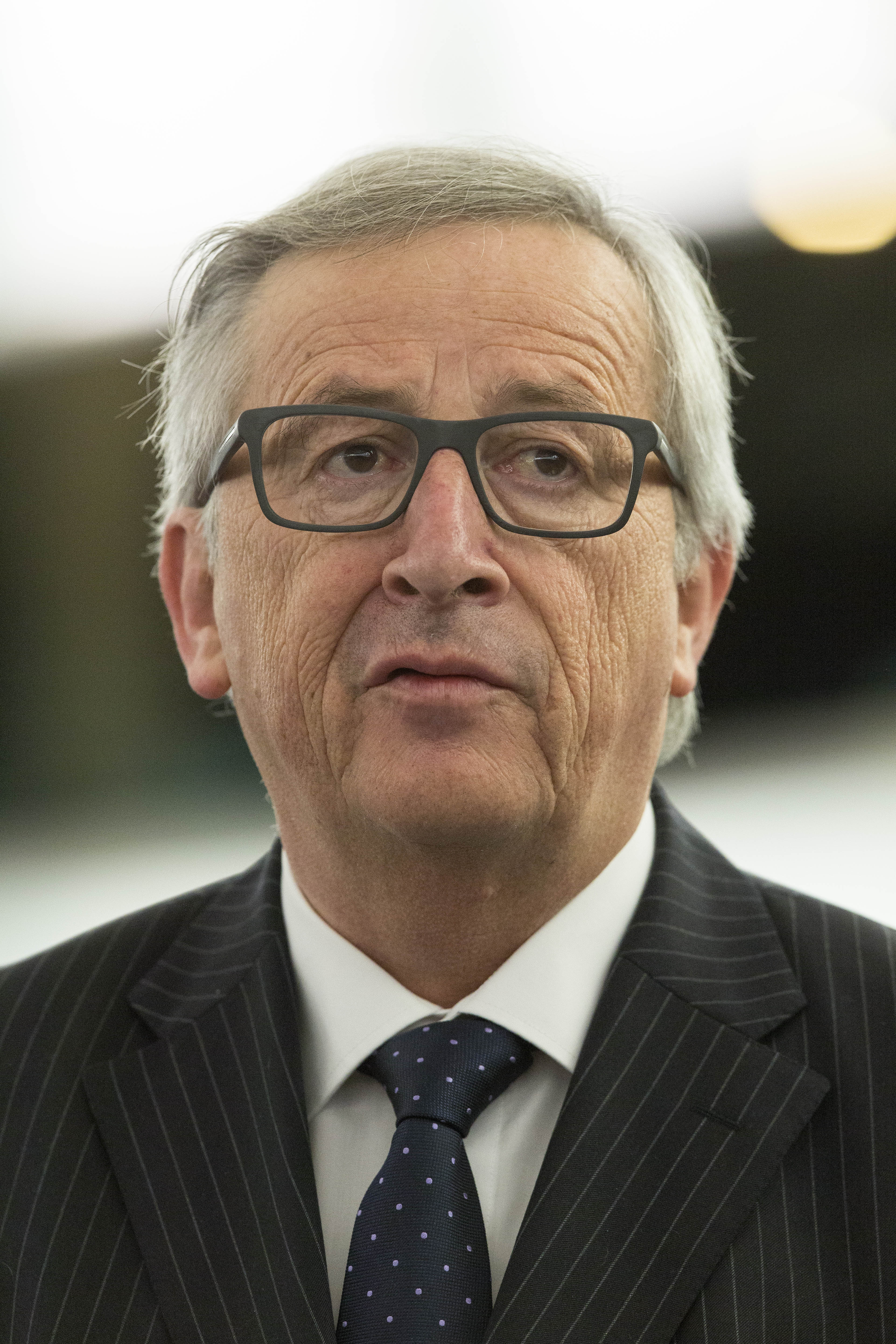
- Date formed: 1 November 2014
- Date dissolved: 30 November 2019

People and organisations
- President of the Commission: President; Jean-Claude Juncker
- Vice-President(s) of the Commission: First Vice President; Frans Timmermans
- No. of commissioners: 26
- Commissioners removed (Death/resignation/dismissal): 4
- Total no. of commissioners: 30
- Member parties: EPP (14); PES (7); ALDE (4); None (1)

History
- Election(s): 2014 European Parliament election
- Predecessor: Barroso Commission
- Successor: Von der Leyen Commission

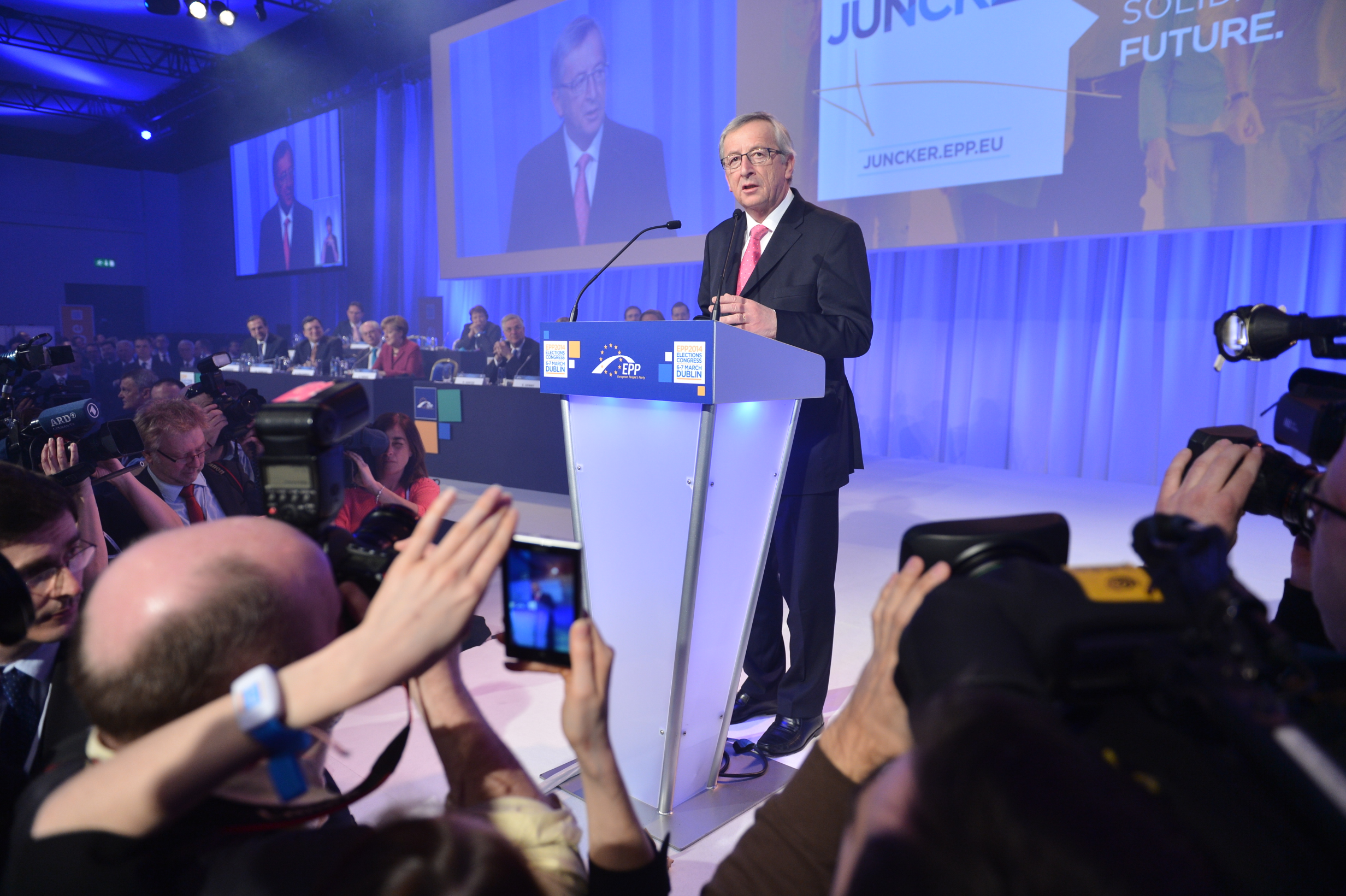
Jean-Claude Juncker delivering a speech at the election congress of the EPP in March 2014

The Juncker Commission was the European Commission in office from 1 November 2014 to 30 November 2019. Its president was Jean-Claude Juncker, who presided over 27 other commissioners (one from each of the states composing the European Union, except Luxembourg, which is Juncker's state). In July 2014, Juncker was officially elected to succeed José Manuel Barroso, who completed his second five-year term in that year.

== Election ==
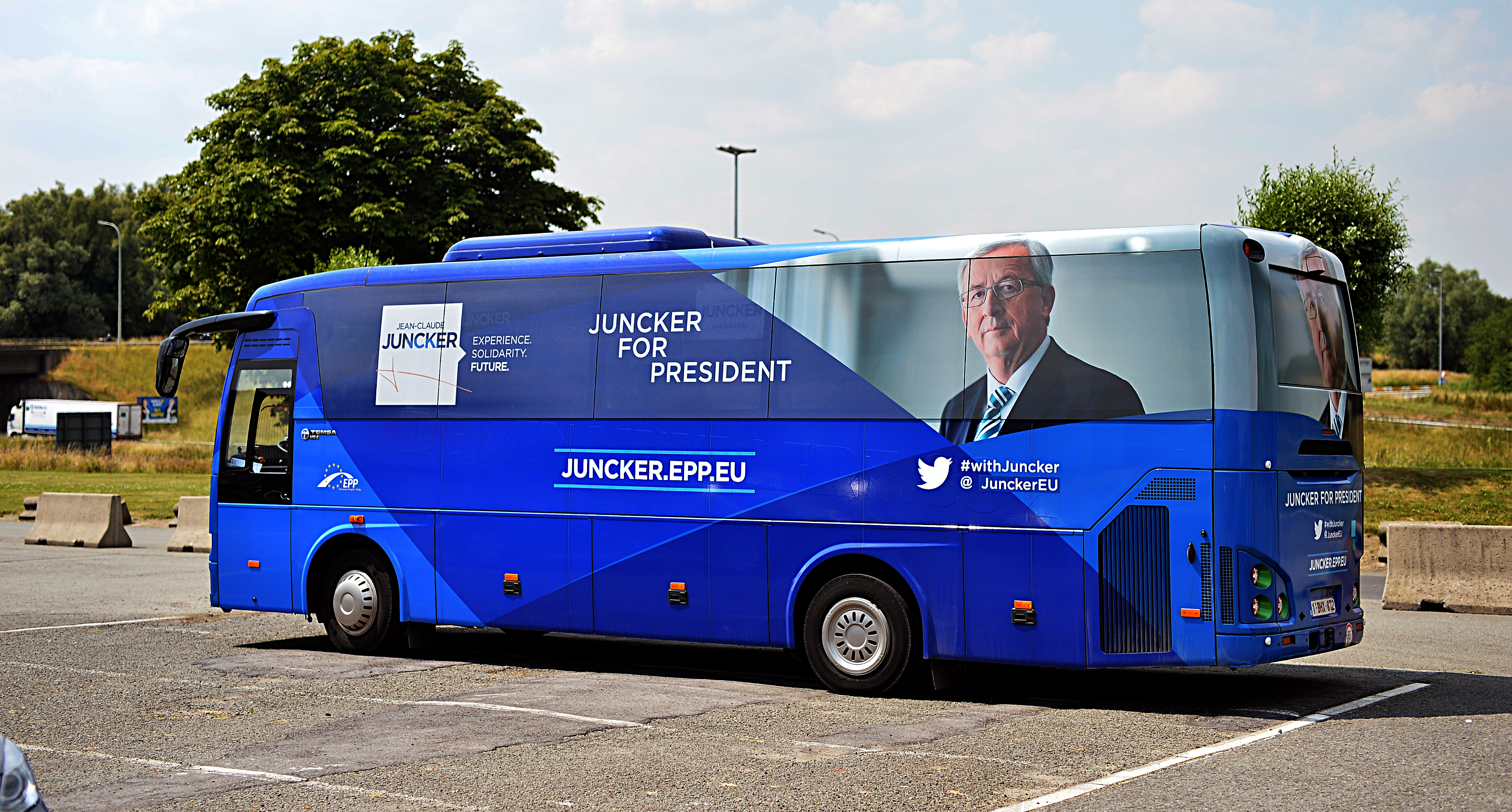
Juncker's campaign bus used for the 2014 European Parliament election

In the 2014 parliamentary election, Juncker campaigned as the candidate of the European People's Party (EPP) for the presidency of the European Commission. The EPP won a plurality in parliament, and on 27 June, the European Council nominated him for the post. Later on 15 July 2014, the European Parliament elected Juncker as the new Commission president. On 22 October, the European Parliament approved the Juncker Commission in its entirety and during the 23–24 October 2014 meeting of the European Council the Council formally appointed the new Commission. On 1 November 2014, the new Commission officially assumed office. Juncker has outlined a ten-point agenda for his Presidency focusing on jobs and growth.

== Policy ==
Under the Juncker Commission, the EU General Data Protection Regulation was passed. The Commission co-developed the law, culminating in a trilogue proposal between the Commission, Parliament, and Council on 15 December 2015. The GDPR entered into force on 24 May 2016.

The Commission abolished retail telephone and mobile data roaming charges in the member states and some others (Roam Like At Home).

=== Institutional reorganisation ===
Juncker made the Commission's work more top-down by strengthening the Secretariat-General in two ways. Firstly, he gave it a gatekeeper function regarding new initiatives. All "major initiatives" must henceforth be approved by the "relevant Vice-President(s) and the First Vice-President, unless they are initiated directly by the President". Secondly, the SG was made chair of all inter-service steering groups (ISGs) dealing with priority initiatives in the Commission's work programme.^{:9-10}^{:8-9}

Juncker also abolished the position of Commissioner for Climate Action, merging it with the energy portfolio, to improve cooperation between staff in the Directorate-General (DG) Energy and the former DG Climate Action.^{:10}

== Commissioners ==
The following college of commissioners serves under Juncker's presidency:

Parties

European People's Party (14) Party of European Socialists (7) Alliance of Liberals and Democrats for Europe (4) None (1)

Juncker Commission
Confirmation by the European Parliament on October 22, 2014 • Appointment by the European Council on October 23, 2014
Portfolio	Designee	Portfolio	Designee	Portfolio	Designee
President – Nomination June 27, 2014; Elected July 15, 2014; Took office November 1, 2014	Former Prime Minister; Jean-Claude Juncker of Luxembourg (EPP–CSV)	First Vice-President; Better Regulation, Inter-Institutional Relations, Rule of Law and Charter of Fundamental Rights – Confirmation October 22, 2014; Took office November 1, 2014	Former Minister of Foreign Affairs; Frans Timmermans of the Netherlands (PES–PvdA)	Vice-President and High Representative of the EU for Foreign Affairs and Security Policy – Confirmation October 22, 2014; Took office November 1, 2014	Former Minister of Foreign Affairs; Federica Mogherini of Italy (PES–PD)
Vice-President; Energy Union – Confirmation October 22, 2014; Took office November 1, 2014	Former European Commissioner; Maroš Šefčovič of Slovakia (PES–Smer-SD)	Vice-President; Jobs, Growth, Investment and Competitiveness – Confirmation October 22, 2014; Took office November 1, 2014	Former Prime Minister; Jyrki Katainen of Finland (EPP–KOK)	Vice-President; Euro and Social Dialogue and Financial Stability, Financial Services and Capital Markets Union – Confirmation October 22, 2014; Took office November 1, 2014	Former Prime Minister; Valdis Dombrovskis of Latvia (EPP–Unity)
European Commissioner; Justice and Consumers – Confirmation October 22, 2014; Took office November 1, 2014	Former Minister of Development; Věra Jourová of Czech Republic (ALDE–ANO)	European Commissioner; Digital Economy and Society – Announced May 10, 2017; Took office July 7, 2017	Former MEP; Mariya Gabriel of Bulgaria (EPP–GERB)	European Commissioner; Budget and Human Resources – Confirmation October 22, 2014; Took office November 1, 2014	Former Minister President; Günther Oettinger of Germany (EPP–CDU)
European Commissioner; Economic and Financial Affairs, Taxation and Customs – Confirmation October 22, 2014; Took office November 1, 2014	Former Minister of Finance; Pierre Moscovici of France (PES–PS)	European Commissioner; Employment, Social Affairs, Skills and Labour Mobility – Confirmation October 22, 2014; Took office November 1, 2014	Former MEP; Marianne Thyssen of Belgium (EPP–CD&V)	European Commissioner; European Neighbourhood Policy and Enlargement Negotiations – Confirmation October 22, 2014; Took office November 1, 2014	Former European Commissioner; Johannes Hahn of Austria (EPP–ÖVP)
European Commissioner; Migration, Home Affairs and Citizenship – Confirmation October 22, 2014; Took office November 1, 2014	Former Minister of Foreign Affairs; Dimitris Avramopoulos of Greece (EPP–ND)	European Commissioner; Health and Food Safety – Confirmation October 22, 2014; Took office November 1, 2014	Former Minister of Health; Vytenis Andriukaitis of Lithuania (PES–SDP)	European Commissioner; Security Union – Confirmation September 15, 2016; Took office September 19, 2016	Former Ambassador; Julian King of United Kingdom (None)
European Commissioner; Internal Market, Industry, Entrepreneurship and SMEs – Confirmation October 22, 2014; Took office November 1, 2014	Former Deputy Prime Minister; Elżbieta Bieńkowska of Poland (EPP–PO)	European Commissioner; Climate Action and Energy – Confirmation October 22, 2014; Took office November 1, 2014	Former Minister of Agriculture; Miguel Arias Cañete of Spain (EPP–PP)	European Commissioner; International Cooperation and Development – Confirmation October 22, 2014; Took office November 1, 2014	Former Deputy Prime Minister; Neven Mimica of Croatia (PES–SDP)
European Commissioner; Competition – Confirmation October 22, 2014; Took office November 1, 2014	Former Deputy Prime Minister; Margrethe Vestager of Denmark (ALDE–RV)	European Commissioner; Transport – Confirmation October 22, 2014; Took office November 1, 2014	Former Deputy Prime Minister; Violeta Bulc of Slovenia (ALDE–SMC)	European Commissioner; Trade – Confirmation October 22, 2014; Took office November 1, 2014	Former Minister of EU Affairs; Cecilia Malmström of Sweden (ALDE–L)
European Commissioner; Environment, Maritime Affairs and Fisheries – Confirmation October 22, 2014; Took office November 1, 2014	Former Minister of Tourism; Karmenu Vella of Malta (PES–PL)	European Commissioner; Education, Culture, Youth and Sport – Confirmation October 22, 2014; Took office November 1, 2014	Former Deputy Prime Minister; Tibor Navracsics of Hungary (EPP–Fidesz)	European Commissioner; Research, Science and Innovation – Confirmation October 22, 2014; Took office November 1, 2014	Former Under-Secretary of State; Carlos Moedas of Portugal (EPP–PSD)
European Commissioner; Agriculture and Rural Development – Confirmation October 22, 2014; Took office November 1, 2014	Former Minister of Environment; Phil Hogan of (Republic of Ireland) Ireland (EPP–FG)	European Commissioner; Humanitarian Aid and Crisis Management – Confirmation October 22, 2014; Took office November 1, 2014	Former MEP; Christos Stylianides of Cyprus (EPP–DISY)		

=== Former members ===
Nominee	Portrait	Portfolio	State	Party
Andrus Ansip		Digital Single Market (Vice President)	Estonia	ALDE; National: ERP
Corina Crețu		Regional Policy	Romania	PES (Before 2019); National: PSD (Before 2019)
Corina Crețu		Regional Policy	Romania	EDP (2019); National: PRO (2019)
Jonathan Hill		Financial Stability, Financial Services and Capital Markets Union	United Kingdom	AECR; National: Conservative
Kristalina Georgieva		Budget and Human Resources (Vice President)	Bulgaria	EPP; National: GERB

== President's cabinet ==
The President's cabinet supports the President of the commission, and thus has a very central role in coordinating the work of the European Commission as a whole. The president's cabinet is led by Clara Martinez Alberola. Formerly, it was led by Martin Selmayr, who has been described as "the most powerful EU chief of staff ever."

== Project teams ==
Juncker has for the first time proposed a commission that clusters certain members together under designated policy areas. These clusters are known as "Project Teams" and will each be headed by one of the vice presidents. Each team is composed of a core membership in addition to members who may fall under its respective umbrella as needed. Timmermans and Georgieva both oversee all commissioners while the remaining five project teams are as follows:

=== A Connected Digital Single Market ===
Vice President: Andrus Ansip (Digital Single Market)
Elżbieta Bieńkowska (Internal Market, Industry, Entrepreneurship and SMEs)
Corina Crețu (Regional Policy)
Phil Hogan (Agriculture and Rural Development)
Věra Jourová (Justice, Consumers and Gender Equality)
Pierre Moscovici (Economic and Financial Affairs, Taxation and Customs)
Günther Oettinger (Digital Economy and Society)
Marianne Thyssen (Employment, Social Affairs, Skills and Labour Mobility)

Vytenis Andriukaitis (Health and Food Safety)
Jonathan Hill/Valdis Dombrovskis (Financial Stability, Financial Services and Capital Markets Union)
Carlos Moedas (Research, Science and Innovation)
Tibor Navracsics (Education, Culture, Youth and Sport)
Margrethe Vestager (Competition)

=== A Deeper and Fairer Economic and Monetary Union ===
Vice President: Valdis Dombrovskis (Euro and Social Dialogue)
Elżbieta Bieńkowska (Internal Market, Industry, Entrepreneurship and SMEs)
Corina Crețu (Regional Policy)
Věra Jourová (Justice, Consumers and Gender Equality)
Jonathan Hill/Valdis Dombrovskis (Financial Stability, Financial Services and Capital Markets Union)
Pierre Moscovici (Economic and Financial Affairs, Taxation and Customs)
Tibor Navracsics (Education, Culture, Youth and Sport)
Marianne Thyssen (Employment, Social Affairs, Skills and Labour Mobility)

=== A New Boost for Jobs, Growth and Investment ===
Vice President: Jyrki Katainen (Jobs, Growth, Investment and Competitiveness)
Elżbieta Bieńkowska (Internal Market, Industry, Entrepreneurship and SMEs)
Miguel Arias Cañete (Climate Action and Energy)
Corina Crețu (Regional Policy)
Jonathan Hill/Valdis Dombrovskis (Financial Stability, Financial Services and Capital Markets Union)
Pierre Moscovici (Economic and Financial Affairs, Taxation and Customs)
Günther Oettinger (Digital Economy and Society)
Violeta Bulc (Transport)
Marianne Thyssen (Employment, Social Affairs, Skills and Labour Mobility)

Vytenis Andriukaitis (Health and Food Safety)
Dimitris Avramopoulos (Migration, Home Affairs and Citizenship)
Johannes Hahn (European Neighbourhood Policy and Enlargement Negotiations)
Phil Hogan (Agriculture and Rural Development)
Věra Jourová (Justice, Consumers and Gender Equality)
Cecilia Malmström (Trade)
Carlos Moedas (Research, Science and Innovation)
Tibor Navracsics (Education, Culture, Youth and Sport)
Karmenu Vella (Environment, Maritime Affairs and Fisheries)
Margrethe Vestager (Competition)

=== A Resilient Energy Union with a Forward-Looking Climate Change Policy ===
Vice President: Maroš Šefčovič (Energy Union)
Elżbieta Bieńkowska (Internal Market, Industry, Entrepreneurship and SMEs)
Miguel Arias Cañete (Climate Action and Energy)
Corina Crețu (Regional Policy)
Phil Hogan (Agriculture and Rural Development)
Karmenu Vella (Environment, Maritime Affairs and Fisheries)
Carlos Moedas (Research, Science and Innovation)
Violeta Bulc (Transport)

Věra Jourová (Justice, Consumers and Gender Equality)
Cecilia Malmström (Trade)
Günther Oettinger (Digital Economy and Society)
Pierre Moscovici (Economic and Financial Affairs, Taxation and Customs)
Marianne Thyssen (Employment, Social Affairs, Skills and Labour Mobility)
Margrethe Vestager (Competition)

=== A Stronger Global Actor ===
Vice President: Federica Mogherini (Foreign Affairs and Security Policy)
Johannes Hahn (European Neighbourhood Policy and Enlargement Negotiations)
Cecilia Malmström (Trade)
Neven Mimica (International Cooperation and Development)
Christos Stylianides (Humanitarian Aid and Crisis Management)

Dimitris Avramopoulos (Migration, Home Affairs and Citizenship)
Miguel Arias Cañete (Climate Action and Energy)
Violeta Bulc (Transport)

=== A European Agenda on Migration ===
In 2015, when European migrant crisis unfolded, new project team was formed.

First Vice President: Frans Timmermans (Better Regulation, Interinstitutional Relations, the Rule of Law and the Charter of Fundamental Rights)
Federica Mogherini (Foreign Affairs and Security Policy)
Dimitris Avramopoulos (Migration, Home Affairs and Citizenship)

Johannes Hahn (European Neighbourhood Policy and Enlargement Negotiations)
Neven Mimica (International Cooperation and Development)
Christos Stylianides (Humanitarian Aid and Crisis Management)
Věra Jourová (Justice, Consumers and Gender Equality)
Julian King (Security Union)
