= Ministry of Industry and Trade (Czech Republic) =

Government ministry of the Czech Republic

Ministry of Industry and Trade Czech Republic
- Ministerstvo průmyslu a obchodu České republiky

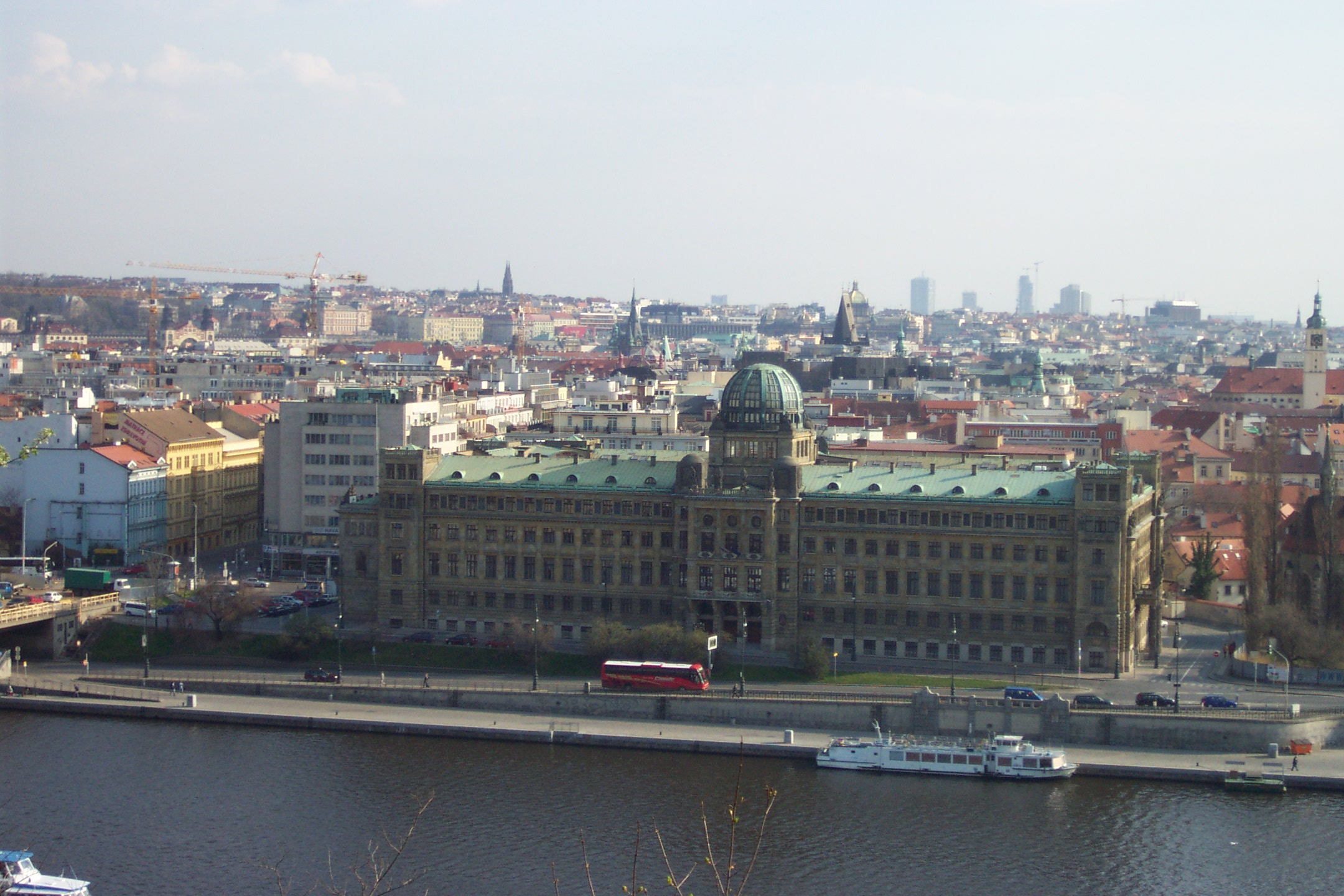
- Ministry of Industry and Trade building in Prague

Agency overview
- Headquarters: Na Františku 32, 110 15 Prague 1 (Old Town); 50°5′34.82″N 14°25′32.95″E
- Agency executive: Karel Havlíček, Minister of Industry and Trade
- Website: mpo.gov.cz

The Ministry of Industry and Trade of the Czech Republic (Czech: Ministerstvo průmyslu a obchodu České republiky) is a government ministry, which was established in 1992.

== List of ministers of industry and trade ==
Name	Portrait	Entered office	Left office	Political party
Vladimír Dlouhý		1 January 1993	2 June 1997	ODA
Karel Kühnl		2 June 1997	22 July 1998	ODA
Miroslav Grégr		22 July 1998	15 July 2002	ČSSD
Jiří Rusnok		15 July 2002	19 March 2003	ČSSD
Milan Urban		16 March 2003	4 September 2006	ČSSD
Martin Říman		4 September 2006	8 May 2009	ODS
Vladimír Tošovský		8 May 2009	13 July 2010	Independent
Martin Kocourek		13 July 2010	14 November 2011	ODS
Martin Kuba		14 November 2011	10 July 2013	ODS
Jiří Cieńciała		10 July 2013	29 January 2014	Independent
Jan Mládek		29 January 2014	28 February 2017	ČSSD
Bohuslav Sobotka		1 March 2017	4 April 2017	ČSSD
Jiří Havlíček		4 April 2017	13 December 2017	ČSSD
Tomáš Hüner		13 December 2017	27 June 2018	Independent
Marta Nováková		27 June 2018	30 April 2019	ANO 2011
Karel Havlíček		30 April 2019	17 December 2021	Independent
Jozef Síkela		17 December 2021	7 October 2024	Independent
Lukáš Vlček		8 October 2024	15 December 2025	Mayors and Independents
Karel Havlíček		15 December 2025	Incumbent	ANO 2011
