= Eero Heinäluoma =

Finnish politician (born 1955)

Eero Heinäluoma MEP
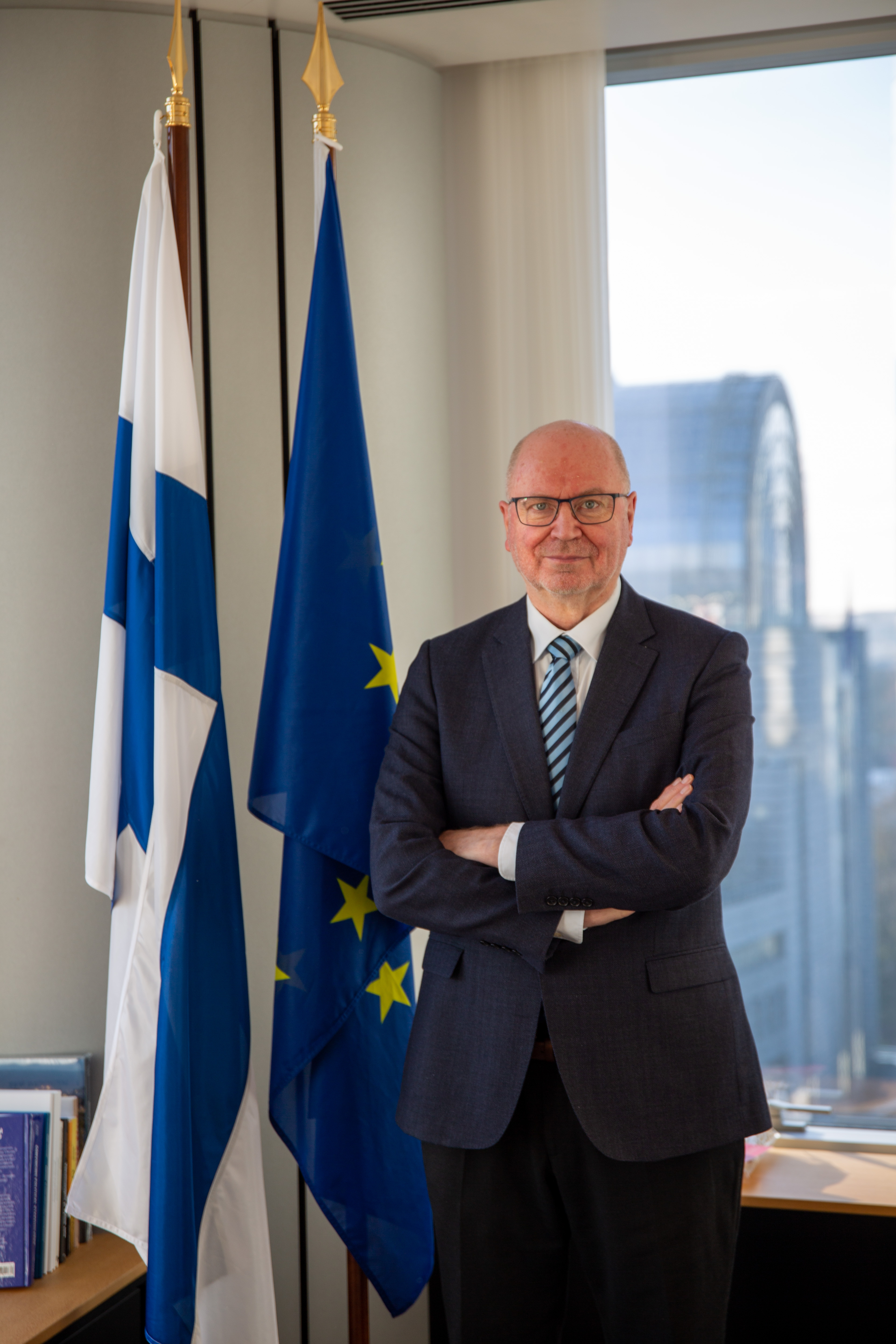
- Heinäluoma in 2024

Member of the European Parliament
- Incumbent
- Assumed office 5 July 2019
- Preceded by: Ninth European Parliament
- Constituency: Finland

Speaker of the Parliament of Finland
- In office 23 June 2011 – 21 April 2015
- Preceded by: Ben Zyskowicz
- Succeeded by: Juha Sipilä

Deputy Prime Minister of Finland
- In office 23 September 2005 – 19 April 2007
- Prime Minister: Matti Vanhanen
- Preceded by: Antti Kalliomäki
- Succeeded by: Jyrki Katainen

Leader of the Social Democratic Party
- In office 10 June 2005 – 6 June 2008
- Preceded by: Paavo Lipponen
- Succeeded by: Jutta Urpilainen

Personal details
- Born: 4 July 1955 (age 70) Kokkola, Finland
- Party: Social Democratic Party
- Spouse: Satu Siitonen-Heinäluoma
- Website: Official website

Eero Olavi Heinäluoma (born 4 July 1955) is a Finnish politician who has been serving as Member of the European Parliament since 2019. A former chairman of the Social Democratic Party of Finland, he was replaced in the party's leadership by Jutta Urpilainen in June 2008. He was Speaker of the Parliament of Finland from 2011 to 2015.

Member of the Finnish parliament, Eveliina Heinäluoma, is Eero Heinäluoma's daughter.

== Early life and education ==
He was born in Kokkola.

Heinäluoma studied political science, but did not finish his degree.

== Political career ==
=== Career in national politics ===
Heinäluoma was elected chairman in June 2005, succeeding former Prime Minister Paavo Lipponen. He was the Minister of Finance of Finland from 2005 to 2007.

Heinäluoma held various posts in the Central Organisation of Finnish Trade Unions (SAK) from 1983 to 2003. He was a director in SAK from 2000 to 2003. Heinäluoma was appointed as party secretary in 2002 and in the 2003 elections, he was elected as a Member of Parliament from the Electoral District of Uusimaa. Ever since he took up the post of Party secretary, he had, according to many, been groomed as Lipponen's heir.

He won on the first ballot, getting 201 of 350 votes. His rivals were Foreign Minister Erkki Tuomioja, with 138 votes, and Minister of Education Tuula Haatainen, with 11 votes.

As party chairman, Heinäluoma ordered a reshuffle of SDP cabinet ministers and assumed the position of Minister of Finance on 23 September 2005. In the 2007 elections, the party led by Heinäluoma suffered a significant loss, losing 15% of their seats in the parliament, and having the worst result since 1962. The loss led to the resignation of Heinäluoma as the party chairman.

Heinäluoma was elected as the chairman of the Social Democratic parliamentary group in February 2010 and served in that position until becoming Speaker in June 2011.

In June 2016, Heinäluoma announced that he would not become his party's candidate for the 2018 presidential election due to his wife's recent death.

=== Member of the European Parliament, 2019–present ===
Heinäluoma became a Member of the European Parliament in the 2019 elections. He has since been serving as treasurer of the S&D Group, making him part of the leadership team around the group's chairwoman Iratxe García.

Heinäluoma joined the European Parliament Committee on Economic and Monetary Affairs and the Parliament's delegation to the EU-Russia Parliamentary Cooperation Committee. He is also a member of the European Parliament Intergroup on Climate Change, Biodiversity and Sustainable Development, the European Parliament Intergroup on Trade Unions and the URBAN Intergroup.

== Other activities ==
- National Audit Office of Finland (NAOF), Member of the advisory board (2017–2019)

== Honours ==
=== Finnish ===
- 1st class of the Order of the Cross of Liberty (2010)
- Commander of the Order of the White Rose of Finland (2006)

=== Foreign ===
- 1st class of the Order of the Cross of Terra Mariana (Estonia, 2014)
- Order of Friendship (Russia, 2017, renounced in 2022)

In 2022 Heinäluoma stated that he had renounced his Russia order of Friendship by throwing it into a trash bin and said that the order had become a ‘travesty of its own name’.

Political offices
Preceded by Antti Kalliomäki	Minister of Finance; 2005–2007	Succeeded by Jyrki Katainen
Preceded by Ben Zyskowicz	Speaker of the Parliament of Finland; 2011–2015	Succeeded by Juha Sipilä
