= Karel Havlíček (politician) =

Czech businessman and politician

Karel Havlíček MP
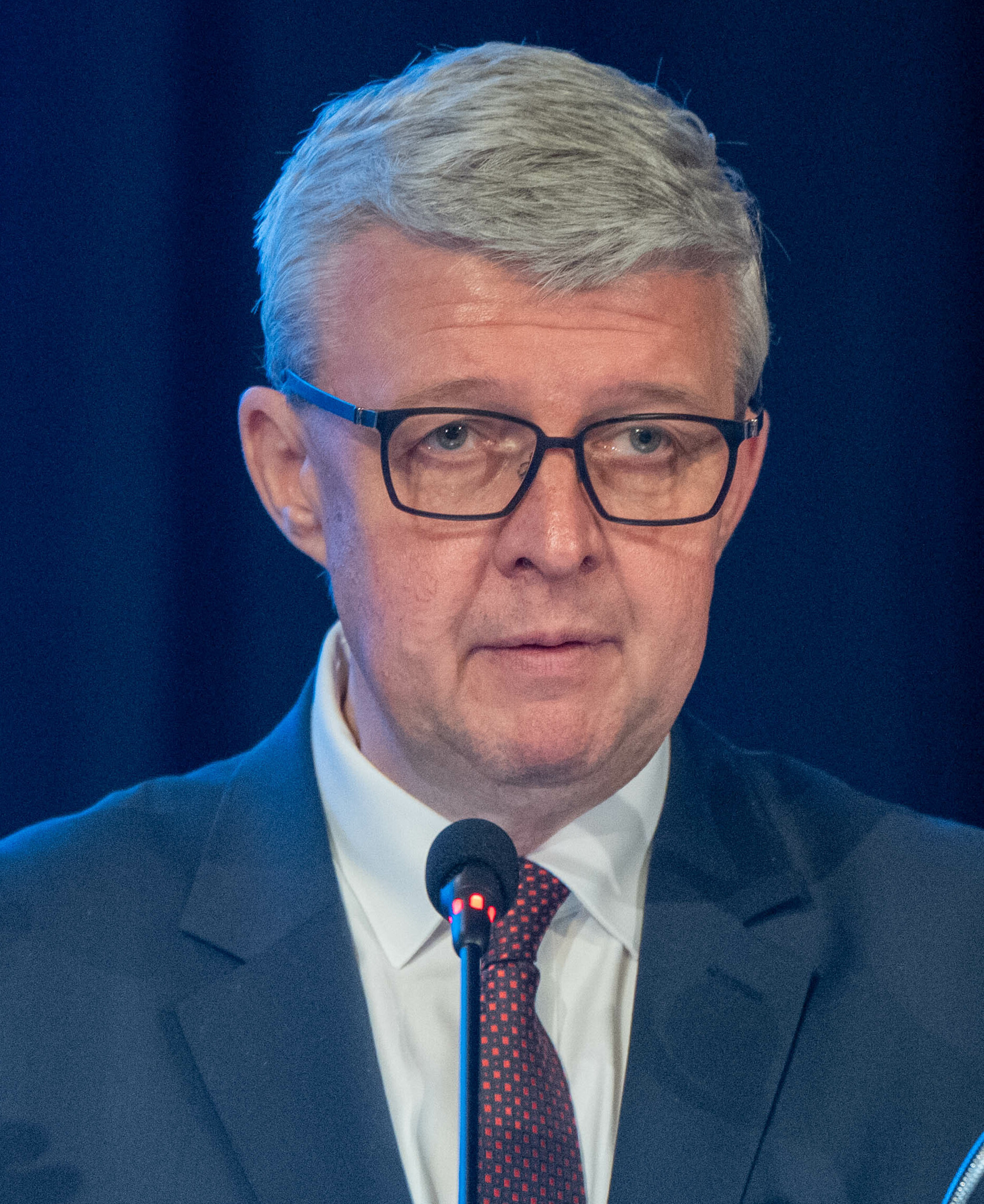
- Havlíček in 2026

First Deputy Prime Minister of the Czech Republic
- Incumbent
- Assumed office 15 December 2025
- Prime Minister: Andrej Babiš
- Preceded by: Vít Rakušan

Deputy Prime Minister of the Czech Republic
- In office 30 April 2019 – 17 December 2021
- Prime Minister: Andrej Babiš

Minister of Industry and Trade
- Incumbent
- Assumed office 15 December 2025
- Prime Minister: Andrej Babiš
- Preceded by: Lukáš Vlček
- In office 30 April 2019 – 17 December 2021
- Prime Minister: Andrej Babiš
- Preceded by: Marta Nováková
- Succeeded by: Jozef Síkela

Minister of Transport
- In office 24 January 2020 – 17 December 2021
- Prime Minister: Andrej Babiš
- Preceded by: Vladimír Kremlík
- Succeeded by: Martin Kupka

Deputy President of the Chamber of Deputies
- In office 18 February 2022 – 8 October 2025

First Deputy Leader of ANO 2011
- Incumbent
- Assumed office 12 February 2022
- Preceded by: Jaroslav Faltýnek

Member of the Chamber of Deputies
- Incumbent
- Assumed office 9 October 2021

Personal details
- Born: 16 August 1969 (age 57) České Budějovice, Czechoslovakia
- Party: Independent (nominated by ANO 2011) (2019–2021); ANO 2011 (2021–present)
- Education: Prague University of Economics and Business, Czech Technical University in Prague
- Occupation: Politician, businessman, economist

Karel Havlíček (born 16 August 1969) is a Czech politician, who has served as First Deputy Prime Minister of the Czech Republic and Minister of Industry and Trade since 15 December 2025, in the third cabinet of Andrej Babiš. He also served as the Deputy Prime Minister, Minister of Industry and Trade, and Minister of Transport between 2019 and 2021, during Babiš's first term as Prime Minister.

== Early life and education ==
In 2004, Havlíček completed his Ph.D in economics and management at the Prague University of Economics and Business.

== Business career ==
Since 2010, Havlíček has been chairman of the board of the Czech Association of Small and Medium Enterprises and Tradesmen, which he co-founded in 2000. Havlíček also has been a member of the government council for research, development and innovation since 2014, and its vice-chair from 2018 until 2022. He previously sat on the government council for public investment, the business council, and the steering committee for the implementation of export strategy.

Since 2015, Havlíček has been the majority owner of textile manufacturer Sindat, with a 58% share through the company F-Comp.

== Political career ==
On 10 April 2019, Havlíček was appointed to the second cabinet of Andrej Babiš, replacing Marta Nováková as Minister for Industry and Trade. On 24 January 2020 he was also appointed as the Minister of Transport, occupying both positions at the same time. In February 2022, Havlíček was elected deputy president of the Chamber of Deputies.

Andrej Babiš has described Havlíček as a future prime minister of the Czech Republic.

== Personal life ==
Havlíček is an avid fan of rock and folk music, and has occasionally written articles on the topic. Since 2010, Havlíček and his wife have been reconstructing the memorial of Karl Philipp von Schwarzenberg in Český Krumlov. Havlíček speaks Czech, English, German, and Russian, as well as some Chinese, French, and Spanish.
