= Jozef Síkela =

Czech politician

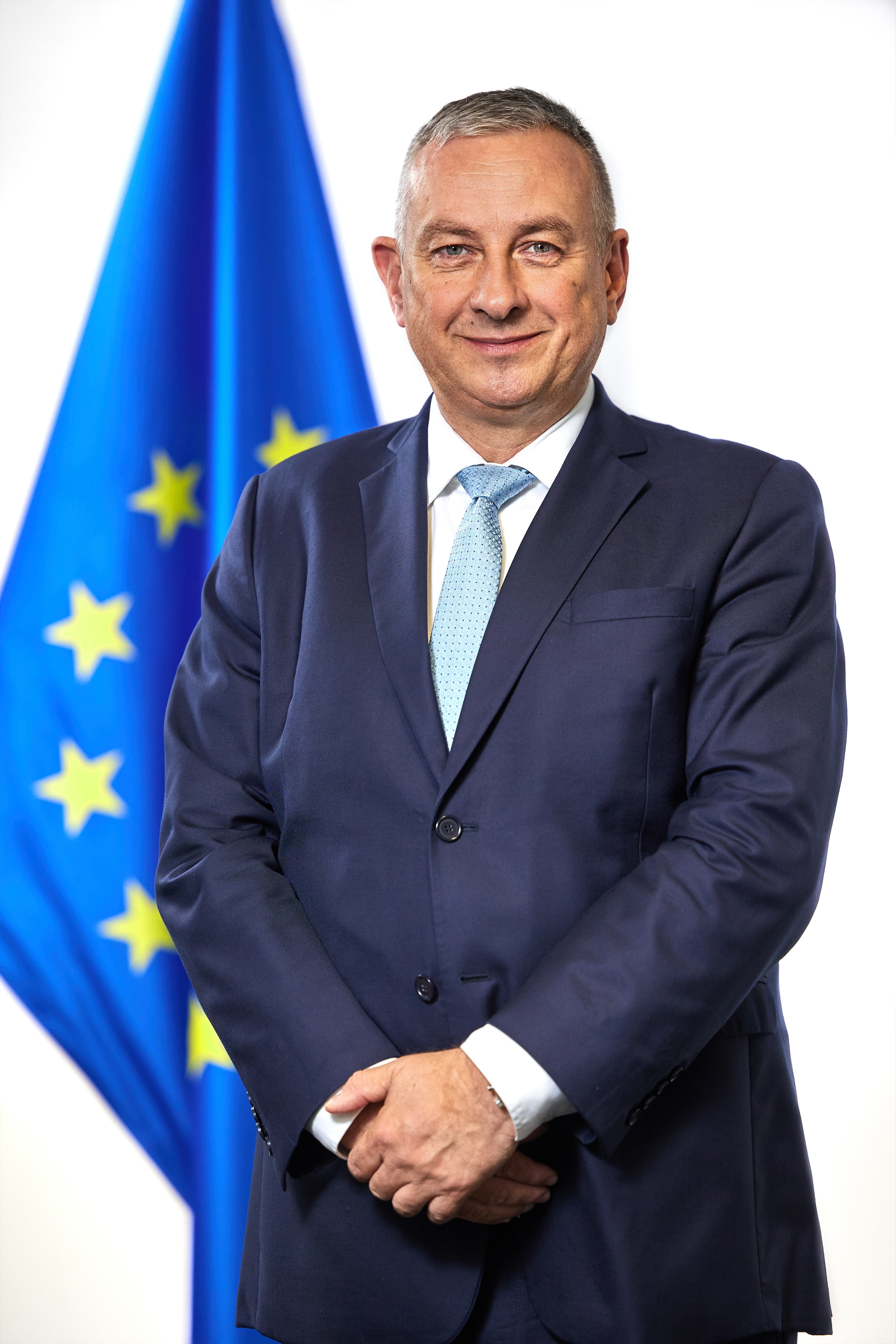
- Official portrait, 2024

European Commissioner for International Partnerships
- Incumbent
- Assumed office 1 December 2024
- Commission: Von der Leyen II
- Preceded by: Jutta Urpilainen

Minister of Industry and Trade
- In office 17 December 2021 – 7 October 2024
- Prime Minister: Petr Fiala
- Preceded by: Karel Havlíček
- Succeeded by: Lukáš Vlček

Personal details
- Born: 17 June 1967 (age 59) Rokycany, Czechoslovakia (now Czech Republic)
- Party: Independent (nominated by Mayors and Independents)
- Education: Prague University of Economics and Business
- Occupation: Politician, investor, manager

Jozef Síkela (Czech pronunciation: [ˈjozɛf ˈsiːkɛla]; born 17 June 1967) is a Czech politician and investment banker who is the European Commissioner for International Partnerships under President Ursula von der Leyen since December 2024. He previously served as the Minister of Industry and Trade of the Czech Republic in the cabinet of Petr Fiala from December 2021 to October 2024.

== Political career ==
=== Minister of Industry and Trade ===
In November 2021, following the resignation of Věslav Michalik, Síkela became the new candidate of the Mayors and Independents (STAN) political party for the post of Czech Minister of Industry and Trade in the emerging government of Petr Fiala (a coalition of SPOLU and PirSTAN). He was appointed to this post in December 2021 by the Czech President, Miloš Zeman, at the castle in Lány.

During Síkela's tenure as Minister of Industry and Trade, the Czech Republic passed legislation aimed at developing renewable energy sources, designed to simplify the permit process for new sources and to allow their efficient use. This included the Community Energy Act, which enabled the sharing of surplus self-generated electricity from renewable sources, and was awarded the Business Law of the Year prize in 2024. The community energy system was launched in August 2024. His ministerial tenure also saw the Czech Republic move away from dependence on Russian gas imports, partially via the acquisition of a share in the LNG terminal in Eemshaven, Netherlands, in cooperation with the ČEZ Group, which Sikela announced in July 2022. In November 2023, the government announced that, again in collaboration with the ČEZ Group, it had acquired a stake in an LNG terminal in Stade, Germany. Síkela represented the Czech Republic at the ceremonial launch of the construction of the terminal.

=== European level ===
When the Czech Republic held the rotating Presidency of the Council of the European Union in 2022, Síkela chaired ministerial meetings of the Foreign Affairs Council, the Competitiveness Council (COMPET) and the Transport, Telecommunications and Energy Council, while the latter was coordinating the EU's response to disruption on the energy markets due to the War in Ukraine. With Síkela chairing the meetings, EU member states agreed on key measures that helped stabilize the energy markets.

In June 2023, Síkela stated in an interview with the daily Právo that he was interested in seeking the position of European Commissioner. Following the 2024 European elections, Síkela was nominated by the Czech government to this role, to serve under President Ursula von der Leyen.

In December 2024, Jozef Síkela was appointed European Commissioner for International Partnerships, responsible for the European Union's partnerships with non-EU countries, focusing on sustainable economic development, poverty reduction, and global stability. He also oversees the EU's Global Gateway strategy, which involves investment in infrastructure projects in partner countries in order to support sustainable growth.

== Personal life ==
Jozef Síkela is an avid fan of classical music, particularly the works of Herbert von Karajan, Antonín Dvořák and Bedřich Smetana. He also enjoys jazz music, 1980s rock, soundtracks, and world music.
