= Olivér Várhelyi =

Hungarian lawyer and diplomat

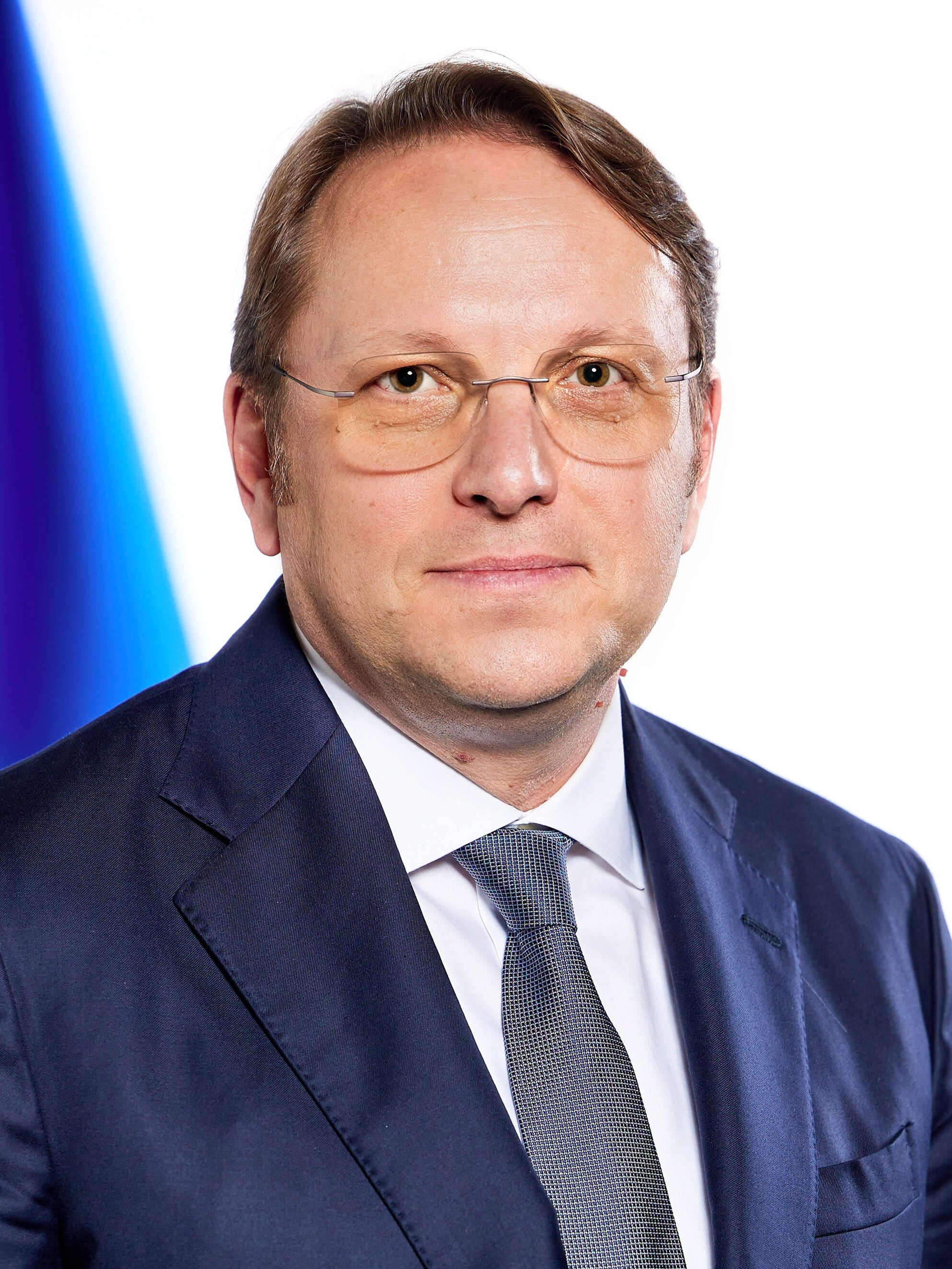
- Official portrait, 2024

European Commissioner for Health and Animal Welfare
- Incumbent
- Assumed office 1 December 2024
- Commission: Von der Leyen II
- Preceded by: Stella Kyriakides

European Commissioner for Neighbourhood and Enlargement
- In office 1 December 2019 – 1 December 2024
- Commission: Von der Leyen I
- Preceded by: Johannes Hahn
- Succeeded by: Marta Kos

Personal details
- Born: 22 March 1972 (age 54) Szeged, Hungary
- Party: Independent; Fidesz (Affiliated)
- Other political affiliations: European People's Party
- Spouse: Imola Várhelyiné Horváth
- Children: 3
- Education: Aalborg University; University of Szeged

Olivér Várhelyi (Hungarian pronunciation: [ˈoliveːr ˈvaːrhɛji]; born 22 March 1972) is a Hungarian lawyer and diplomat who is the European Commissioner for Health and Animal Welfare in the von der Leyen Commission II since December 2024. He previously served as the European Commissioner for Neighbourhood and Enlargement from 2019 to 2024 after the rejection of László Trócsányi by the European Parliament.

== Biography ==
=== Studies ===
Várhelyi obtained a Master of European Legal Studies at Aalborg University, Denmark, in 1994, and a Law degree at the University of Szeged, in 1996. In 2005 he passed the bar exam.

=== Career ===
Várhelyi started his career in the Hungarian public administration in 1996 at the Ministry for Industry and Trade. He then moved to the Foreign Affairs Ministry, where he was tasked with alignment with the EU acquis. From 1998 to 2001 he was chief of cabinet of the head of the legal unit of the ministry. He then moved to Brussels at the Hungarian mission to the EU, as legal counselor and then head of legal service until 2006, after Hungary's EU accession.

For two years Várhelyi then served as head of the EU law department at the Hungarian Ministry of Justice. From 2008 to 2011 he briefly served as head of unit at the European Commission, in charge of industrial property rights at the Directorate General Internal Market and Services.

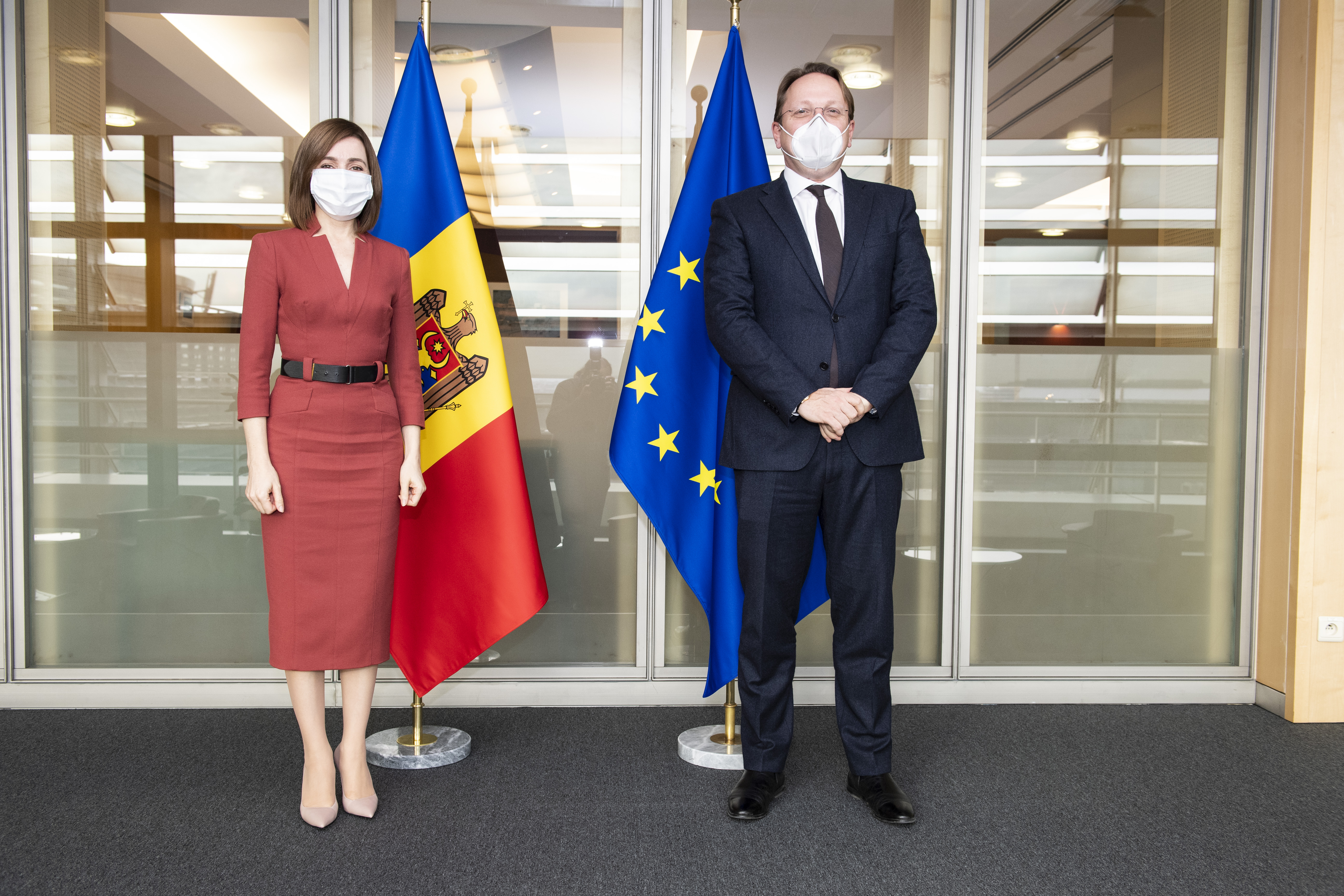
Várhelyi with Moldovan President Maia Sandu in Brussels, 18 January 2021

He then moved back to the Hungarian foreign service, service from 2011 onward as deputy head and then from 2015 head of the Permanent Representation in Brussels, with the rank of ambassador extraordinary and plenipotentiary. In his role as Ambassador to the EU, he was considered highly loyal to Orbán, despite having no formal party affiliation. Despite being deemed highly intelligent and extremely knowledgeable, his style has been described as "incredibly rude", with "an abrasive leadership style that has included screaming, yelling and swearing at staffers", as well as adopting a more combative approach in ambassadors' meetings than other permanent representatives.

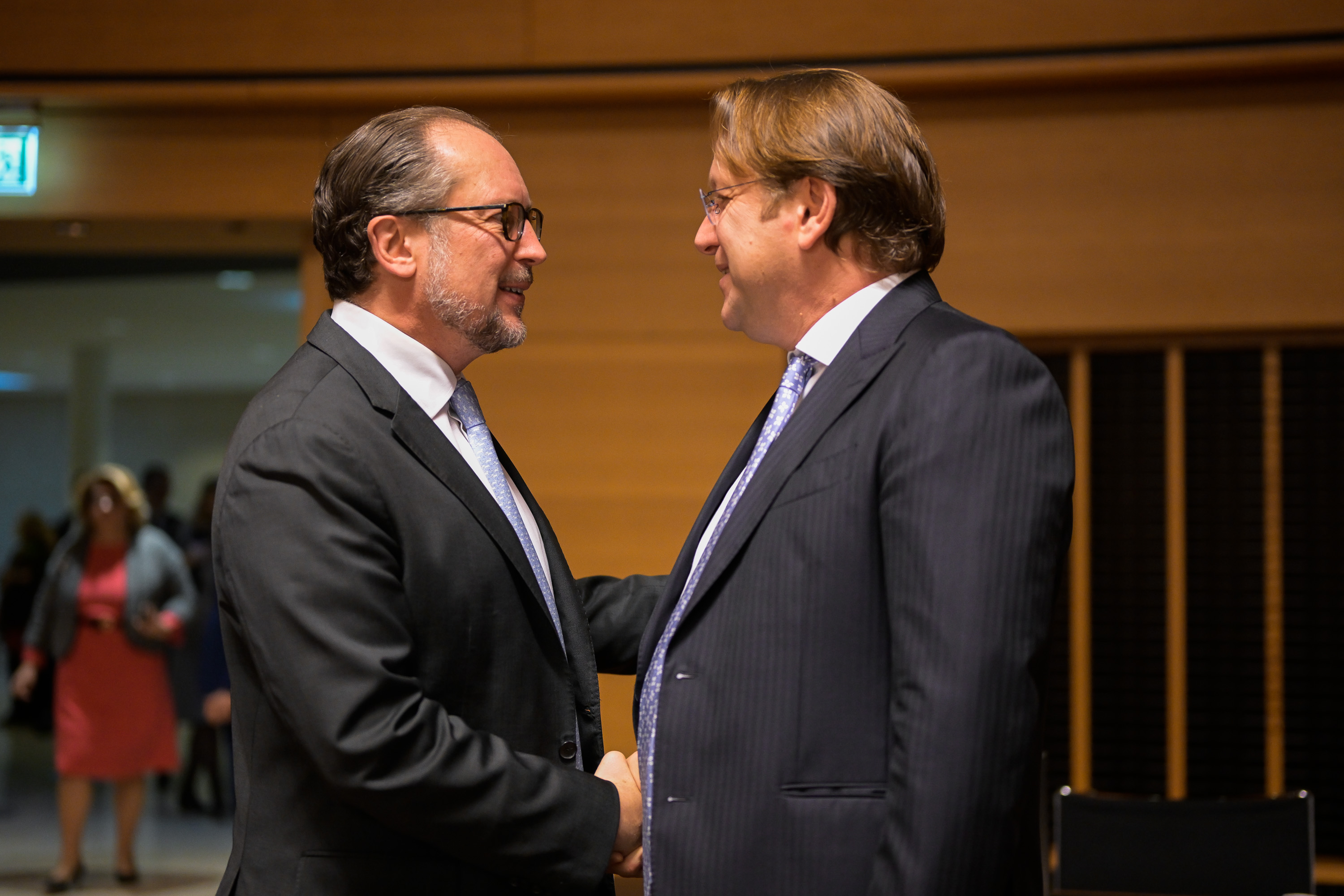
Várhelyi greeting Austrian Foreign Minister Alexander Schallenberg, 16 September 2022

In 2019 Várhelyi was appointed by Hungary's PM Viktor Orbán to the post of European Commissioner from Hungary to the von der Leyen Commission, after the European Parliament had rejected his first appointee, László Trócsányi. He was entrusted with the portfolio of European Neighbourhood and Enlargement. His appointment was greeted by long-standing Orbán allies, including Serbia's President Aleksandar Vučić and Bosnian Serb leader Milorad Dodik. It was decried by several observers and enlargement experts, among other reasons for him not upholding criteria on democracy and the rule of law with regards to possible EU accessions. In his Parliamentary hearing, Várhelyi did not gather two thirds of votes, thus being subject to an additional round of written questions from MEPs.

In his asset declaration, Várhelyi declared ownership of a 5035 m^{2} farm in Szentendre, a 160 m^{2} family house in Szeged with a 586 m^{2} garden, and a 57 m^{2} apartment in Budapest. He also declared ownership of a BMW from 1992 and a Lexus RX from 2018.

Várhelyi generated controversy on 15 February 2023 for calling MEPs "idiots" during a hearing on the western Balkans. Due to this incident, other MEPs demanded Várhelyi's resignation.

He generated controversy again on 9 October 2023 by announcing via social media that all EU aid to Palestinians had been frozen. Four hours later his colleague Commissioner Janez Lenarčič made a contradictory announcement via social media stating that "EU humanitarian aid to #Palestinians in need will continue as long as needed."

In 2024 Várhelyi mentioned the attempted assassination of Robert Fico during phone negotiations with prime-minister of Georgia, Irakli Kobakhidze. After details of the call were made public Várhelyi stated that "one part of my phone call was not just fully taken out of context but was also presented to the public in a way which could give rise to a complete misinterpretation of the originally intended aim of my phone call". The prime minister of Georgia considered mentioning the assassination of Fico as a personal threat.

Following the 2024 European Parliament election he was nominated as the Commissioner-Designate of Health and Animal Welfare. His hearing took place in November 2024. His nomination was rejected after the first round, with European parliamentarians questioning his positions on areas including animal welfare and abortion. This led to an additional round of questions.

On October 9, 2025, a joint investigation by Der Spiegel, De Tijd, Direkt36 and others reported that Hungarian intelligence officials disguised as diplomats tried to infiltrate EU institutions while Várhelyi was Hungary's ambassador to the bloc. The European Commission will probe reports that Hungarian Prime Minister Viktor Orbán's government deployed intelligence officers to Brussels to gather information on EU institutions and recruit an EU official. While the Hungarian government remained silent, at least thirty-five MEPs wanted Várhelyi to be fired.

In November 2026, while delivering a speech at a cancer summit in Brussels, Belgium, Várhelyi had a dusty material, alleged to be human ashes, thrown on him by two members of the activist group Cancer Colère, one of whom being co-founder Fleur Breteau. The protest was made against the passing of Omnibus X, a European Commission legislative package dealing with the approval of certain pesticides for usage on farmers’ crops. The protesters were escorted away and Várhelyi continued with his speech as planned.

Political offices
Preceded by Tibor Navracsics	European Commissioner from Hungary; 2019–present	Incumbent
Preceded by Johannes Hahn	European Commissioner for Neighbourhood and Enlargement; 2019–2024	Succeeded by Marta Kos
