= Von der Leyen Commission =

Von der Leyen Commission refers to either of two consecutive European Commissions headed by Ursula von der Leyen:

- Von der Leyen Commission I (2019–2024)
- Von der Leyen Commission II (2024–2029)
