= Von der Leyen Commission II =

European Commission since 2024

- 8th Commission of the European Union

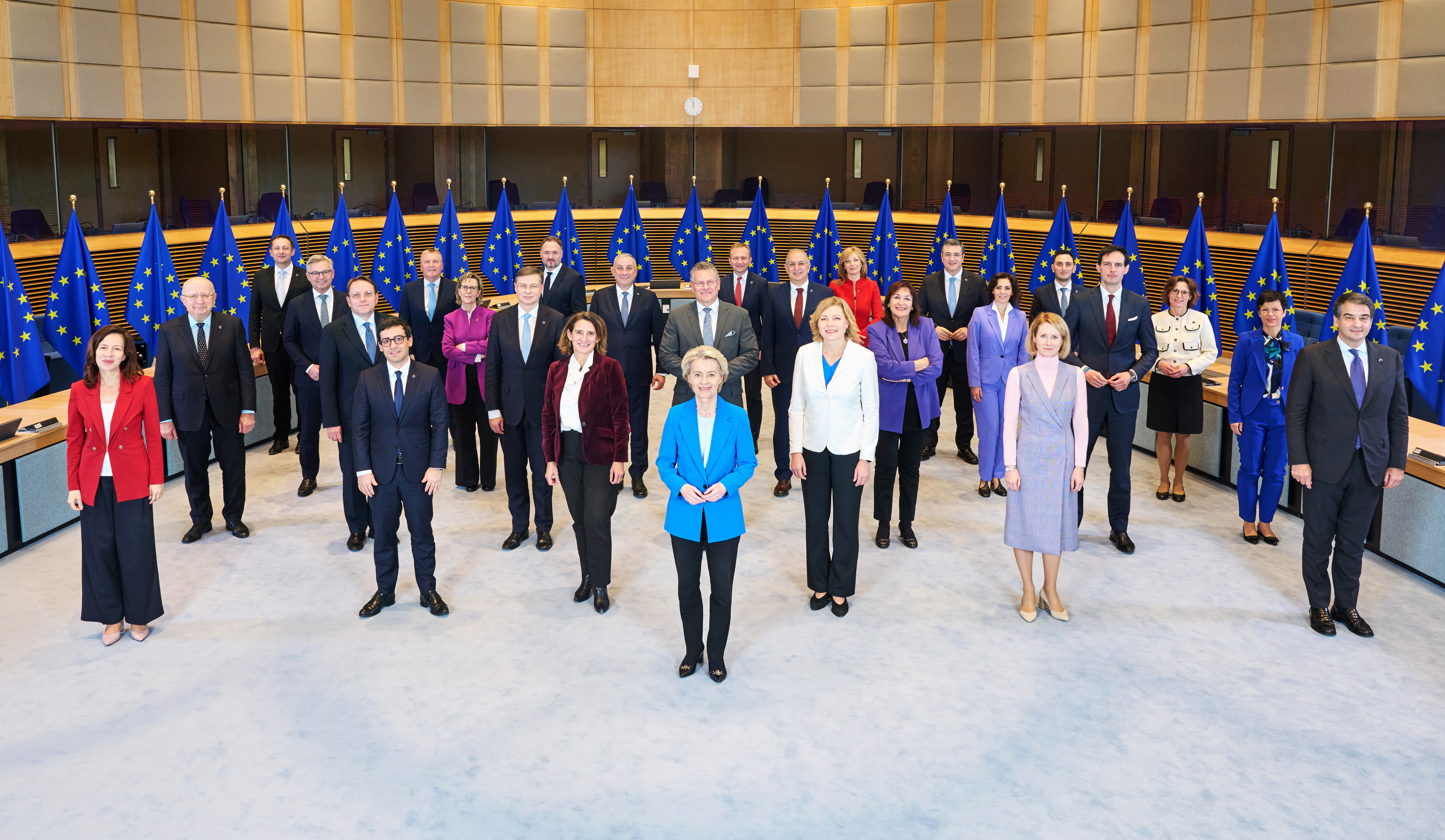
- The College of Commissioners in 2024
- Date formed: 1 December 2024

People and organisations
- President of the Commission: Ursula von der Leyen (EPP, GER)
- Total no. of commissioners: 27
- Member parties: EPP (13); PES (5); None (5); ALDE Party (3); ECR Party (1)

History
- Election(s): 2024 European Parliament election
- Legislature term(s): Tenth
- Predecessor: von der Leyen Commission I

The second von der Leyen Commission is the current European Commission, in office since 1 December 2024. It consists of one commissioner from each of the member states of the European Union – including Ursula von der Leyen, its president, who is from Germany.

The Commission was approved by the European Parliament on 27 November with 51% of the majority, the least supported European Commission by the Parliament since 1993, when it was given the right to vote on the college.

== College of Commissioners ==
The second Ursula von der Leyen commission will be organised on three levels:

1. president;
2. executive vice presidents;
3. commissioners.

Regardless of the three-level structure of the commission, the president of the commission emphasised that all commissioners share collective responsibility for decisions made by the Commission.

Von der Leyen Commission II
Portfolio	Portrait	Name	EU Party (N. Party)	Member state	Directorate General	Took office	Left office	Ref.
President of the European Commission		Ursula von der Leyen	EPP (CDU)	Germany	SG, SJ, COMM	1 December 2024		
Vice-President and High Representative for Foreign Affairs and Security Policy		Kaja Kallas	ALDE (ER)	Estonia	EEAS, FPI	1 December 2024		
Executive Vice-President and European Commissioner for Clean, Just and Competitive Transition		Teresa Ribera	PES (PSOE)	Spain	COMP	1 December 2024		
Executive Vice-President and European Commissioner for Digital and Frontier Technologies		Henna Virkkunen	EPP (Kok)	Finland	CNECT, DIGIT	1 December 2024		
Executive Vice-President and European Commissioner for Prosperity and Industrial Strategy		Stéphane Séjourné	Independent (Note: Renaissance is in the Renew Europe Group but does not belong to any European party.) (RE)	France	GROW	1 December 2024		
Executive Vice-President and European Commissioner for Social Rights and Skills, Quality Jobs and Preparedness		Roxana Mînzatu	PES (PSD)	Romania	EMPL, EAC	1 December 2024		
Executive Vice-President and European Commissioner for Cohesion and Reforms		Raffaele Fitto	ECR (FdI)	Italy	REGIO	1 December 2024		
European Commissioner for Trade and Economic Security, Interinstitutional Relations, and Transparency		Maroš Šefčovič	PES (susp.) (Smer)	Slovakia	TRADE, TAXUD, OP	1 December 2024		
European Commissioner for Economy and Productivity and Commissioner for Implementation and Simplification		Valdis Dombrovskis	EPP (V)	Latvia	ECFIN, EUROSTAT	1 December 2024		
European Commissioner for Sustainable Transport and Tourism		Apostolos Tzitzikostas	EPP (ND)	Greece	MOVE	1 December 2024		
European Commissioner for Internal Affairs and Migration		Magnus Brunner	EPP (ÖVP)	Austria	HOME	1 December 2024		
European Commissioner for Startups, Research and Innovation		Ekaterina Zaharieva	EPP (GERB)	Bulgaria	RTD, JRC	1 December 2024		
European Commissioner for Agriculture and Food		Christophe Hansen	EPP (CSV)	Luxembourg	AGRI	1 December 2024		
European Commissioner for Climate, Net-Zero and Clean Growth		Wopke Hoekstra	EPP (CDA)	Netherlands	CLIMA, TAXUD	1 December 2024		
European Commissioner for Budget, Anti-Fraud and Public Administration		Piotr Serafin	EPP (KO)	Poland	BUDG, HR, DGT, SCIC, OLAF, IAS, OIL, OIB, EPSO, PMO, EUSA	1 December 2024		
European Commissioner for Environment, Water Resilience, and a Competitive Circular Economy		Jessika Roswall	EPP (M)	Sweden	ENV	1 December 2024		
European Commissioner for Financial Services and the Savings and Investments Union		Maria Luís Albuquerque	EPP (PSD)	Portugal	FISMA	1 December 2024		
European Commissioner for Fisheries and Oceans		Costas Kadis	Independent	Cyprus	MARE	1 December 2024		
European Commissioner for Preparedness and Crisis Management, and Commissioner for Equality		Hadja Lahbib	ALDE (MR)	Belgium	ECHO	1 December 2024		
European Commissioner for Intergenerational Fairness, Youth, Culture, and Sport		Glenn Micallef	PES (PL)	Malta	EAC	1 December 2024		
European Commissioner for Energy and Housing		Dan Jørgensen	PES (S)	Denmark	ENER	1 December 2024		
European Commissioner for Enlargement		Marta Kos	Independent (Note: Affiliated to GS, which is affiliated to the Renew Europe Group.)	Slovenia	NEAR	1 December 2024		
European Commissioner for Mediterranean		Dubravka Šuica	EPP (HDZ)	Croatia	MENA	1 December 2024		
European Commissioner for Health and Animal Welfare		Olivér Várhelyi	Independent (Note: Affiliated to Fidesz, which is affiliated to the PfE Group.)	Hungary	SANTE	1 December 2024		
European Commissioner for International Partnerships		Jozef Síkela	Independent (Note: Mayors and Independents is in the EPP Group but does not belong to any European party.) (STAN)	Czech Republic	INTPA	1 December 2024		
European Commissioner for Defence and Space		Andrius Kubilius	EPP (TS-LKD)	Lithuania	DEFIS	1 December 2024		
European Commissioner for Democracy, Justice, the Rule of Law and Consumer Protection		Michael McGrath	ALDE (FF)	Ireland	JUST	1 December 2024		

=== Commissioner groups ===
According to portfolios the commissioner groups will be as following:

President

- Commissioner for Equality
- Commissioner for Implementation and Simplification
- Commissioner for Interinstitutional Relations and Foresight
- Commissioner for Budget, Anti-Fraud and Public Administration

Vice-President and High Representative for Foreign Affairs and Security Policy

- Commissioner for Enlargement
- Commissioner for Preparedness and Crisis Management
- Commissioner for the Mediterranean
- Commissioner for International Partnerships

Executive Vice-President for Tech Sovereignty, Security and Democracy (Commissioner for Digital and Frontier Technologies)

- Commissioner for Defence and Space
- Commissioner for Internal Affairs and Migration
- Commissioner for Democracy, Justice and the Rule of Law
- Commissioner for Startups, Research and Innovation

Executive Vice-President for Prosperity and Industrial Strategy (Commissioner for Prosperity and Industrial Strategy)

- Commissioner for Startups, Research and Innovation
- Commissioner for Trade and Economic Security
- Commissioner for Economy and Productivity
- Commissioner for Financial Services and the Savings and Investments Union

Executive Vice-President for Cohesion and Reforms (Commissioner for Cohesion and Reforms)

- Commissioner for Enlargement
- Commissioner for Fisheries and Oceans
- Commissioner for Sustainable Transport and Tourism
- Commissioner for Agriculture and Food

Executive Vice-President for People, Skills and Preparedness (Commissioner for Social Rights and Skills, Quality Jobs and Preparedness)

- Commissioner for Mediterranean
- Commissioner for Preparedness and Crisis Management
- Commissioner for Intergenerational Fairness, Youth, Culture and Sport
- Commissioner for Health and Animal Welfare

Executive Vice-President for Clean, Just and Competitive Transition (Commissioner for Clean, Just and Competitive Transition)

- Commissioner for Climate, Net Zero and Clean Growth
- Commissioner for Environment, Resilience and a Competitive Circular Economy
- Commissioner for Energy and Housing
- Commissioner for Health and Animal Welfare

== Formation ==
=== Election of the President of the Commission ===
To be elected Commission President, a candidate must be proposed by the European Council with a reinforced qualified majority (at least 72% of the states representing at least 65% of the population), and receive a majority of the votes of the members of the European Parliament (at least 361 out of 720).

On 17 June, an "informal meeting" of the European Council was held, where the heads of state and government discussed the next institutional cycle and their candidate for the Commission presidency. On 25 June, negotiators from the EPP (Kyriakos Mitsotakis and Donald Tusk), PES (Pedro Sánchez and Olaf Scholz) and Renew Europe (Emmanuel Macron and Mark Rutte) reached a preliminary agreement on the nominations.

On 27 June, during the European Council meeting, national leaders proposed Ursula von der Leyen (EPP) as candidate for President of the European Commission, after being named the European People's Party nominee in March 2024. Hungary's Viktor Orbán voted against von der Leyen and abstained on Kallas. Italy's Giorgia Meloni abstained from the vote on von der Leyen but voted against Costa and Kallas for their posts.

Proposal by the European Council Required majority: at least 72% of the states representing at least 65% of the population
Public voting indication	Member states of the European Union
In favour 25 / 27	Austria Belgium Bulgaria Croatia Cyprus Czech Republic Denmark Estonia Finland France Germany Greece Ireland Latvia Lithuania Luxembourg Malta Netherlands Poland Portugal Romania Slovakia Slovenia Spain Sweden
Against 1 / 27	Hungary
Abstained 1 / 27	Italy

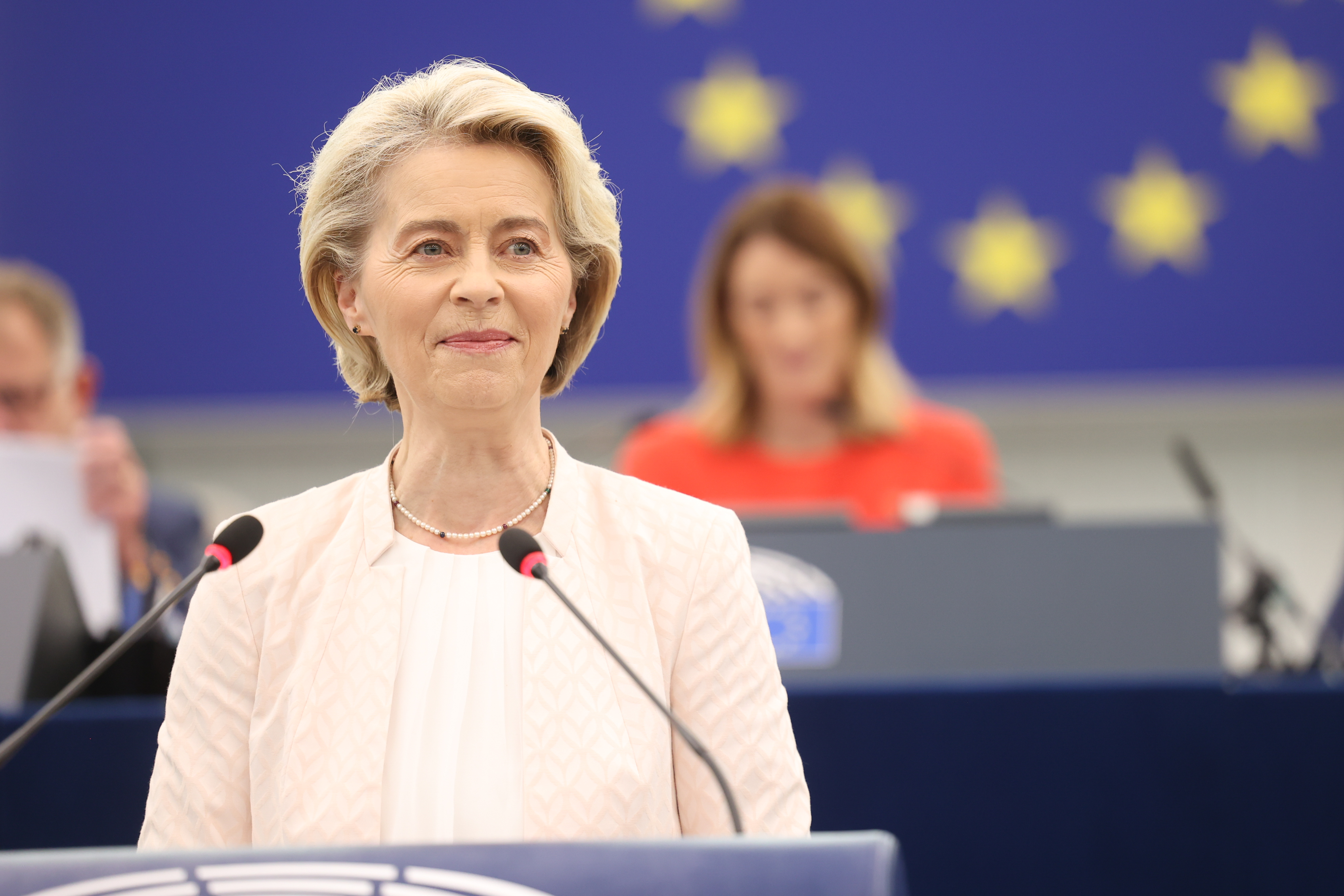
Ursula von der Leyen during her statement for the candidacy of Commission President

In the following weeks, von der Leyen had bilateral meetings with EPP, S&D, Renew, G/EFA, and ECR groups to gather support for her re-election. On 18 July, she presented to the European Parliament her "Political Guidelines", followed by a debate with MEPs. Ursula von der Leyen was re-elected president of the European Commission in a secret ballot, with 401 votes in favour, 284 against, and 22 cast blank or invalid votes.

Election by the European Parliament
Required majority 360 out of 719	Public voting indication (individual votes unknown, as the ballot was secret)								
Required majority 360 out of 719	The Left	S&D	Greens/EFA	Renew	EPP	ECR	Patriots	ESN	NI
Position	46	136	53	77	188	78	84	25	32
Position	Against	In favour	In favour	In favour	In favour	Free vote	Against	Against	—N/a
In favour 401 / 719		81 or more: (Italy) PD (21); (Spain) PSOE (20); (Germany) SPD (14); (Romania) PSD (11); (Sweden) S (5); (Austria) SPÖ (5); (Netherlands) PvdA (4); (Croatia) SDP (4); (Belgium) Vooruit (2)	39 or more: (Germany) Grüne (12); (Germany) (Netherlands) Volt (5); (Netherlands) GL (4); (Italy) EV (4); (Denmark) SF (3); (Sweden) MP (3); (Austria) Grüne (2); (Finland) Vihr (2); (Lithuania) DSVL (1); (Czech Republic) Piráti (1); (Belgium) Groen (1); (Croatia) Možemo! (1)	18 or more: (Belgium) MR (3); (Romania) ADU (3); (Bulgaria) PP (2); (Austria) NEOS (2); (Sweden) C (2); (Slovenia) GS (1); (Lithuania) LP (1); (Belgium) OVLD (1); (Belgium) LE (1); (Sweden) L (1); (Spain) EAJ-PNV (1)	97 or more: (Germany) CDU (23); (Spain) PP (22); (Poland) KO (21); (Italy) FI (8); (Romania) PNL (8); (Germany) CSU (6); (Croatia) HDZ (6); (Austria) ÖVP (5); (Republic of Ireland) FG (4); (Sweden) M (4); (Lithuania) TS-LKD (3); (Belgium) CD&V (2); (Czech Republic) TOP 09 (2); (Estonia) Isamaa (1+); (Bulgaria) DSB (1); (Slovenia) NSi (1); (Sweden) KD (1); (Czech Republic) KDU-ČSL (1); (Germany) ÖDP (1)	5 or more: (Belgium) N-VA (3); (Czech Republic) ODS (2)			
Against 284 / 719	25 or more: (Italy) M5S (8); (Republic of Ireland) SF (2); (Belgium) PTB/PVDA (2); (Germany) Linke (2); (Italy) SI (2); (Sweden) V (2); (Spain) Podemos (2); (Denmark) EL (1); (Portugal) PCP (1); (Republic of Ireland) Flanagan (1); (Spain) SMR (1); (Spain) EH Bildu (1); (Germany) Rackete (1)	4 or more: (Bulgaria) BSP (1+); (Cyprus) DIKO (1); (Slovenia) SD (1); (Republic of Ireland) Labour (1)	11 or more: (France) EELV (5); (Slovenia) Vesna (1); (Belgium) Ecolo (1); (Spain) ERC (1); (Spain) Més (1); (Spain) BNG (1); (Spain) Comuns (1)	14 or more: (Germany) FDP (5); (Republic of Ireland) FF (4); (Germany) FW (3); (Republic of Ireland) II (1); (Republic of Ireland) McNamara (1)	10 or more: (France) LR (6); (Slovenia) SDS (4)	60 or more: (Italy) FdI (24); (Poland) PiS (18); (Romania) AUR (5); (Sweden) SD (3); (France) IND (3); (Luxembourg) ADR (1); (Lithuania) LVŽS (1); (Croatia) DP (1); (Bulgaria) ITN (1); (Netherlands) SGP (1); (France) MC (1); (Estonia) Madison (1)	58 or more: (France) RN (30); (Italy) Lega (8); (Austria) FPÖ (6); (Czech Republic) ANO (6); (Spain) Vox (6); (Belgium) VB (3); (Portugal) CH (2); (Czech Republic) Přísaha (1); (Czech Republic) Turek (1); (Hungary) KDNP (1)	All 25: (Germany) AfD (14); (Bulgaria) Vaz (3); (Poland) NN (3); (Slovakia) REP (1); (Hungary) MHM (1); (France) REC (1); (Lithuania) TTS (1); (Czech Republic) SPD (1)	All 32: (Germany) BSW (6); (Slovakia) Smer (5); (Spain) SALF (3); (Greece) KKE (2); (Romania) SOS RO (2); (Poland) RN (2); (Cyprus) Panayiotou (1); (Czech Republic) KSČM (1); (Czech Republic) SD–SN (1); (Slovakia) REP (1); (Slovakia) Hlas (1); (Greece) NIKI (1); (Greece) PE (1); (Poland) KKP (1); (Germany) PdF (1); (Germany) PARTEI (1); (Germany) AfD (1)
Blank or Void 22 / 719		2 or more: (Belgium) PS (2)				1 or more: (Czech Republic) ODS (1)			
Non Voting 12 / 719									
Total : 719	46	136	53	77	188	78	84	25	32

=== Selection of the Commissioners ===
The President-elect of the European Union invites the member states to nominate commissioners in accordance with the rules set out in the Treaty on the European Union and by the European Council. The President-elect decides on the organisation of their Commission, reviews the nominees, and presents a college of Commissioners, with each nominated Commissioner being responsible for a specific policy portfolio. The President-elect also appoints Vice Presidents among the Commissioners. The President-elect's proposed College of Commissioners is reviewed by the European Parliament in committee hearings.

==== Commissioner candidates ====
On 25 July 2024, President-elect Ursula von der Leyen sent the letters to member states asking them to officially nominate candidates for the post of European Commissioner before 30 August 2024. As she did with her first commission, von der Leyen called for member states to each nominate two candidates for the European Commission, a woman and a man. However, Bulgaria is the only country to have followed von der Leyen's request. All the other leaders of EU member states have each nominated only one candidate, and most of them are men. Romania originally put forward socialist MEP Victor Negrescu but later put forward MEP Roxana Mînzatu, switching a male nominee for a female nominee.

Percentage of Commissioners nominee by gender
Male	59.3% (16)
Female	40.7% (11)

Percentage of Commissioners nominee by European political party
EPP	48.1% (13)
PES	18.5% (5)
Ind.	14.8% (5)
ALDE	11.1% (3)
ECR	3.7% (1)

On 17 September 2024, Ursula von der Leyen announced in a press conference the college of commissioners and their portfolios. The share of women in the proposed commission is 40.7%, down from 44.4 percent in 2019. The average age of the new Commission nominees is 52, dropping from 56 in 2019. In terms of structure, there are six Executive Vice-Presidents, down from 7 (with 3 executive vice-presidents) in 2019. The proposed College includes five returning commissioners: three of them are for a second mandate (Šuica, Várhelyi, Hoekstra), while Dombrovskis would return for a third term, and Šefčovič for a fourth term. The portfolio repartition reflects the declared priorities, with a strong focus on competitiveness, industrial policy and defence.

On 19 September 2024, the Council of the European Union adopted, by common accord with the President-elect of the Commission, the list of persons whom it proposes for appointment as members of the Commission to the European Parliament.

Commissioner nominees by member state
Commissioner					Hearing			Ref.
Name	Gender	EU Party (N. Party)	Member state	Assigned Portfolio	Date	Committee	Decision	Ref.
Magnus Brunner	M	EPP (ÖVP)	Austria	Commissioner for Internal Affairs and Migration	5 November 2024	LIBE; DEVE	Confirmed	
Hadja Lahbib	F	ALDE (MR)	Belgium	Commissioner for Preparedness and Crisis Management; Commissioner for Equality (Note: Hadja Lahbib (Belgium), Valdis Dombrovskis (Latvia) and Maroš Šefčovič (Slovakia) have each been assigned two portfolios. For the second portfolio (Equality, Implementation and Simplification, Interinstitutional Relations and Foresight) each of them will be reporting directly to the president of the Commission.)	6 November 2024	DEVE / FEMM; LIBE / ENVI; EMPL / SANT	Confirmed	
Ekaterina Zaharieva	F	EPP (GERB)	Bulgaria	Commissioner for Startups, Research and Innovation	5 November 2024	ITRE CULT	Confirmed	
Dubravka Šuica	F	EPP (HDZ)	Croatia	Commissioner for Mediterranean	5 November 2024	AFET: EMPL / LIBE / DROI	Confirmed	
Costas Kadis	M	Ind.	Cyprus	Commissioner for Fisheries and Oceans	6 November 2024	PECH ENVI	Confirmed	
Jozef Síkela	M	Ind. (STAN)	Czech Republic	Commissioner for International Partnerships	6 November 2024	DEVE: AFET / FEMM; INTA / LIBE	Confirmed	
Dan Jørgensen	M	PES (S)	Denmark	Commissioner for Energy and Housing	5 November 2024	ITRE / EMPL; ENVI / REGI; IMCO / ECON	Confirmed	
Kaja Kallas	F	ALDE (ER)	Estonia	Vice-President and High Representative for Foreign Affairs and Security Policy	12 November 2024	AFET: DEVE / INTA / FEMM; DROI / SEDE	Confirmed	
Henna Virkkunen	F	EPP (Kok)	Finland	Executive Vice-President for Tech Sovereignty, Security and Democracy and Commissioner for Digital and Frontier Technologies	12 November 2024	ITRE / IMCO; LIBE / JURI; SEDE / CULT	Confirmed	
Stéphane Séjourné	M	ALDE (RE)	France	Executive Vice-President for Prosperity and Industrial Strategy and Commissioner for Industry, SMEs and the Single Market	12 November 2024	ITRE / IMCO; ENVI / ECON; INTA / EMPL; BUDG / JURI	Confirmed	
Ursula von der Leyen	F	EPP (CDU)	Germany	President	Elected by the European Parliament on 18 July 2024			
Apostolos Tzitzikostas	M	EPP (ND)	Greece	Commissioner for Sustainable Transport and Tourism	4 November 2024	TRAN ENVI	Confirmed	
Olivér Várhelyi	M	Ind.	Hungary	Commissioner for Health and Animal Welfare	6 November 2024	ENVI / AGRI; ITRE / SANT	Confirmed	
Michael McGrath	M	ALDE (FF)	Ireland	Commissioner for Democracy, Justice and the Rule of Law	4 November 2024	LIBE / IMCO / JURI; AFCO / CULT / BUDG; CONT / FEMM	Confirmed	
Raffaele Fitto	M	ECR (FdI)	Italy	Executive Vice-President for Cohesion and Reforms and Commissioner for Cohesion Policy, Regional Development and Cities	12 November 2024	REGI: TRAN / BUDG / PECH; EMPL / ECON	Confirmed	
Valdis Dombrovskis	M	EPP (V)	Latvia	Commissioner for Economy and Productivity; Commissioner for Implementation and Simplification	7 November 2024	ECON / JURI; BUDG / AFCO / EMPL; IMCO / FISC	Confirmed	
Andrius Kubilius	M	EPP (TS–LKD)	Lithuania	Commissioner for Defence and Space	6 November 2024	AFET / ITRE; TRAN / SEDE	Confirmed	
Christophe Hansen	M	EPP (CSV)	Luxembourg	Commissioner for Agriculture and Food	4 November 2024	AGRI: PECH / ENVI	Confirmed	
Glenn Micallef	M	PES (PL)	Malta	Commissioner for Intergenerational Fairness, Youth, Culture and Sport	4 November 2024	CULT: EMPL / LIBE / JURI	Confirmed	
Wopke Hoekstra	M	EPP (CDA)	Netherlands	Commissioner for Climate, Net-Zero and Clean Growth	7 November 2024	ENVI / ITRE / ECON; TRAN / EMPL / FISC	Confirmed	
Piotr Serafin	M	EPP (PO)	Poland	Commissioner for Budget, Anti-Fraud and Public Administration	7 November 2024	BUDG / CONT; LIBE / JURI	Confirmed	
Maria Luís Albuquerque	F	EPP (PSD)	Portugal	Commissioner for Financial Services and the Savings and Investments Union	6 November 2024	ECON: IMCO / LIBE	Confirmed	
Roxana Mînzatu	F	PES (PSD)	Romania	Executive Vice-President for People, Skills and Preparedness and Commissioner for Skills, Education and Culture, Quality Jobs and Social Rights	12 November 2024	EMPL / CULT; FEMM / LIBE	Confirmed	
Maroš Šefčovič	M	PES (susp.) (Smer)	Slovakia	Commissioner for Trade and Economic Security; Commissioner for Interinstitutional Relations and Transparency	4 November 2024	INTA / AFCO; AFET / IMCO / PETI; DEVE / JURI	Confirmed	
Marta Kos	F	Ind.	Slovenia	Commissioner for Enlargement	7 November 2024	AFET: LIBE / AFCO / DROI	Confirmed	
Teresa Ribera	F	PES (PSOE)	Spain	Executive Vice-President for Clean, Just and Competitive Transition and Commissioner for Competitiveness	12 November 2024	ENVI / ECON / ITRE; IMCO / EMPL / TRAN; REGI / AGRI	Confirmed	
Jessika Roswall	F	EPP (M)	Sweden	Commissioner for Environment, Water Resilience and a Competitive Circular Economy	5 November 2024	ENVI: IMCO / ITRE / AGRI	Confirmed	
Hearings: Responsible Committee Invited Committee

==== Hearings ====
According to the Rule 129 of the Rules of Procedure of the European Parliament, the confirmation hearings are conducted by the appropriate committee or committees for each commissioner. According to the Annex VII of the Rules of Procedure of the European Parliament, the parliament has to evaluate Commissioners-designate based on their general competence, European commitment and personal independence. It has to assess knowledge of their prospective portfolio and their communication skills. Historically, the European Parliament has rejected at least one candidate during every mandate since 2004.

On 3 October 2024, the Conference of Presidents of the European Parliament agreed on the calendar for the hearings to be held from 4 to 12 November, and decided on the division of responsibilities among committees for the confirmation hearings.

=== Election of the Commission ===
The College of Commissioners are subjected to the confirmation by a majority of the votes cast by the European Parliament. On 27 November, the new Commission was approved by Parliament, with 370 MEPs voting in favour, 282 against, and 36 abstentions. This corresponds to a 51 % majority of all members, the least supported European Commission by the Parliament since 1993, when it was given the right to vote on the college, and fewer than the 401 MEPs who voted for the election of Ursula von der Leyen as Commission President.

Strasbourg, 27 November 2024 – simple majority required
Ballot	Votes		Percentage
1	In favour	370 / 719	53,8 %
1	Against	282 / 719	40,9 %
1	Abstained	36 / 719	5,2 %
1	Total votes	688	95,7 %

After being approved by the Parliament, the Commission was formally appointed by the European Council, acting by a qualified majority, on 28 November. It subsequently assumed office on 1 December 2024.

== Policy ==
The policy priorities of the second von der Leyen Commission were initially outlined in the 30-page "Political Guidelines for the Next European Commission 2024–2029" document that Ursula von der Leyen published in July 2024. The seven priority areas are:

- A new plan for Europe's sustainable prosperity and competitiveness
- A new era for European defence and security
- Supporting people, strengthening our societies and our social model
- Sustaining our quality of life: Food security, water and nature
- Protecting our democracy, upholding our values
- A global Europe: Leveraging our power and partnerships
- Delivering together and preparing our Union for the future

As an important cross-cutting priority area, the Commission also put increasing emphasis on streamlining regulations and cutting red tape, even if similar attempts to reduce "administrative burdens" had regularly featured in the EU agenda in the 1990s onwards. However, this time these efforts were further intensified and turned into omnibus directives that targeted recently initiated EU rules in the field of corporate sustainability and responsibility rules.

=== European Green Deal ===
The European Green Deal, approved in 2020, is a set of policy initiatives by the von der Leyen Commission with the overarching aim of making the European Union climate neutral in 2050. In November 2024, Vice-President for Clean, Just and Competitive Transition, Teresa Ribera, expressed support for the European Green Deal and the green transition. She said in an interview with El País: "Ursula von der Leyen has given me a vice presidency: It's a signal that [the green agenda] remains a priority. Environmental transition is one of the great engines of the approaching economic and industrial transformation." In December 2024, Ribera warned that the Commission would not postpone the ban on the sale of combustion engine cars in the EU after 2035.

On 26 February 2025, the Commission announced a collection of measures backed by 100 billion euros (US$104.94 billion) to support EU-made clean manufacturing, called the Clean Industrial Deal. Ribera said that "By 2030, the EU's renewable targets alone will generate over 3.5 million new jobs in the renewable sector. But this transition means change — some sectors will need to face challenging circumstances."

On 2 July 2025, the Commission proposed a new climate target for 2040, aiming for a 90% reduction in net greenhouse gas emissions compared to 1990 levels.

According to a study by scientists at Utrecht University published on 24 August 2025, the Atlantic meridional overturning circulation (AMOC) could start to collapse from the 2060s. The collapse of the AMOC would be a severe climate catastrophe, resulting in a cooling of the Northern Hemisphere. European Climate Commissioner Wopke Hoekstra described the findings as a "wake-up call". In August 2025, Teresa Ribera suggested that AMOC should be "added to the list of national security acronyms in Europe" given the serious consequences of AMOC's collapse.

=== Foreign issues ===
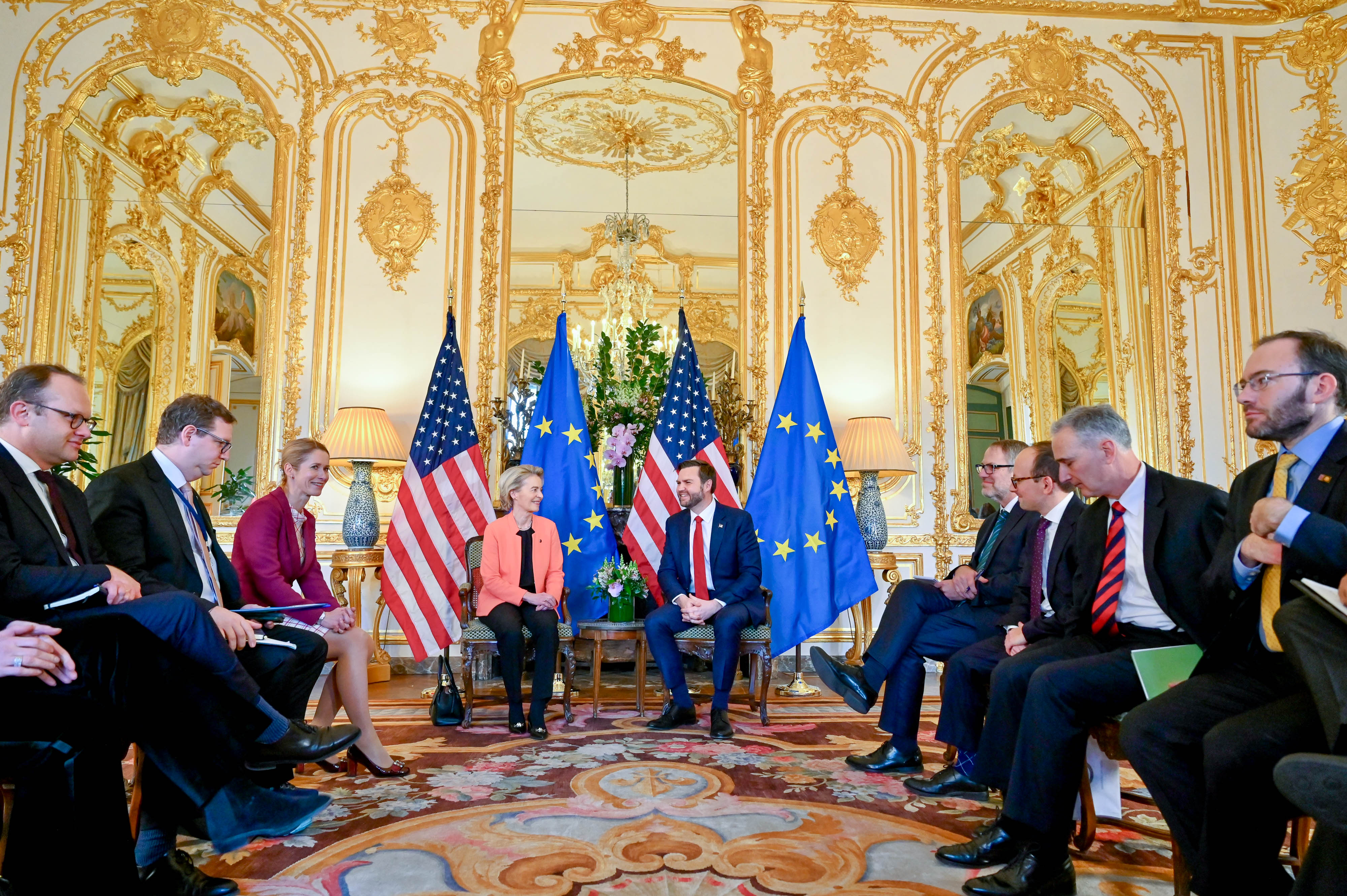
Ursula von der Leyen, Kaja Kallas and US Vice President JD Vance at the AI Action Summit in Paris on 11 February 2025

In November 2024, the candidate for the post of High Representative for Foreign Policy, Kaja Kallas, stated that the People's Republic of China must pay a "higher cost" for its support of the Russian invasion of Ukraine. In February 2025, Kallas again condemned China, saying that "Without China's support, Russia would not be able to continue its military aggression with the same force. China is the largest provider of dual-use goods and sensitive items that sustain Russia's military-industrial base and that are found on the battlefield in Ukraine."

On 17 January 2025, the European Commission concluded the negotiations on the modernisation of the EU-Mexico Global Agreement. The modernized agreement is meant to reduce agri-food tariffs, simplify standards and establish climate and labour rights cooperation by the parties. On 3 September 2025, the Commission sent its proposal for the decision on ratification of the Agreement to the Council.

On 20 February 2025, Kallas expressed doubts about US President Donald Trump's attempts to negotiate a peace deal in the Russia-Ukraine war, warning that "if we are giving everything on the plate to the aggressor, it sends a signal to all the aggressors in the world that you can do this."

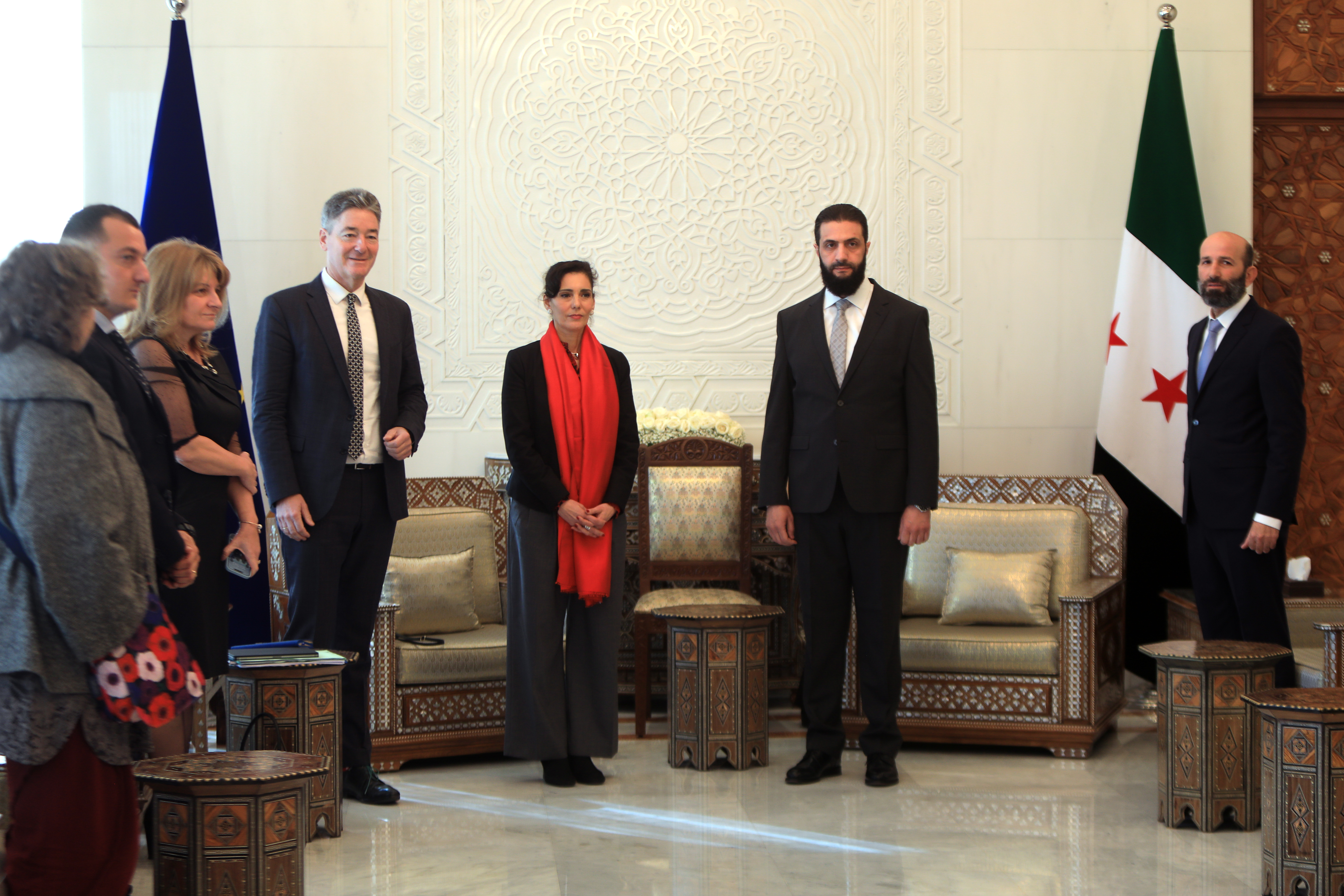
European Commissioner Hadja Lahbib with Syrian President Ahmed al-Sharaa in Damascus, Syria, 17 January 2025

On 24 February 2025, Kallas met with Israeli Foreign Minister Gideon Sa'ar in Brussels for the first formal talks between Israel and the EU since the Gaza war. The European Commission rejected a request from Ireland and Spain to review the EU–Israel Association Agreement.

In January 2025, European Commissioner Hadja Lahbib met with Syrian President Ahmed al-Sharaa, the leader of the Sunni Islamist group Hay'at Tahrir al-Sham. On 8 March 2025, the EEAS condemned attacks "by pro-Assad elements" on Syrian government forces during clashes in western Syria. On 17 March 2025, the European Union pledged €2.5 billion in aid for the Syrian transitional government.

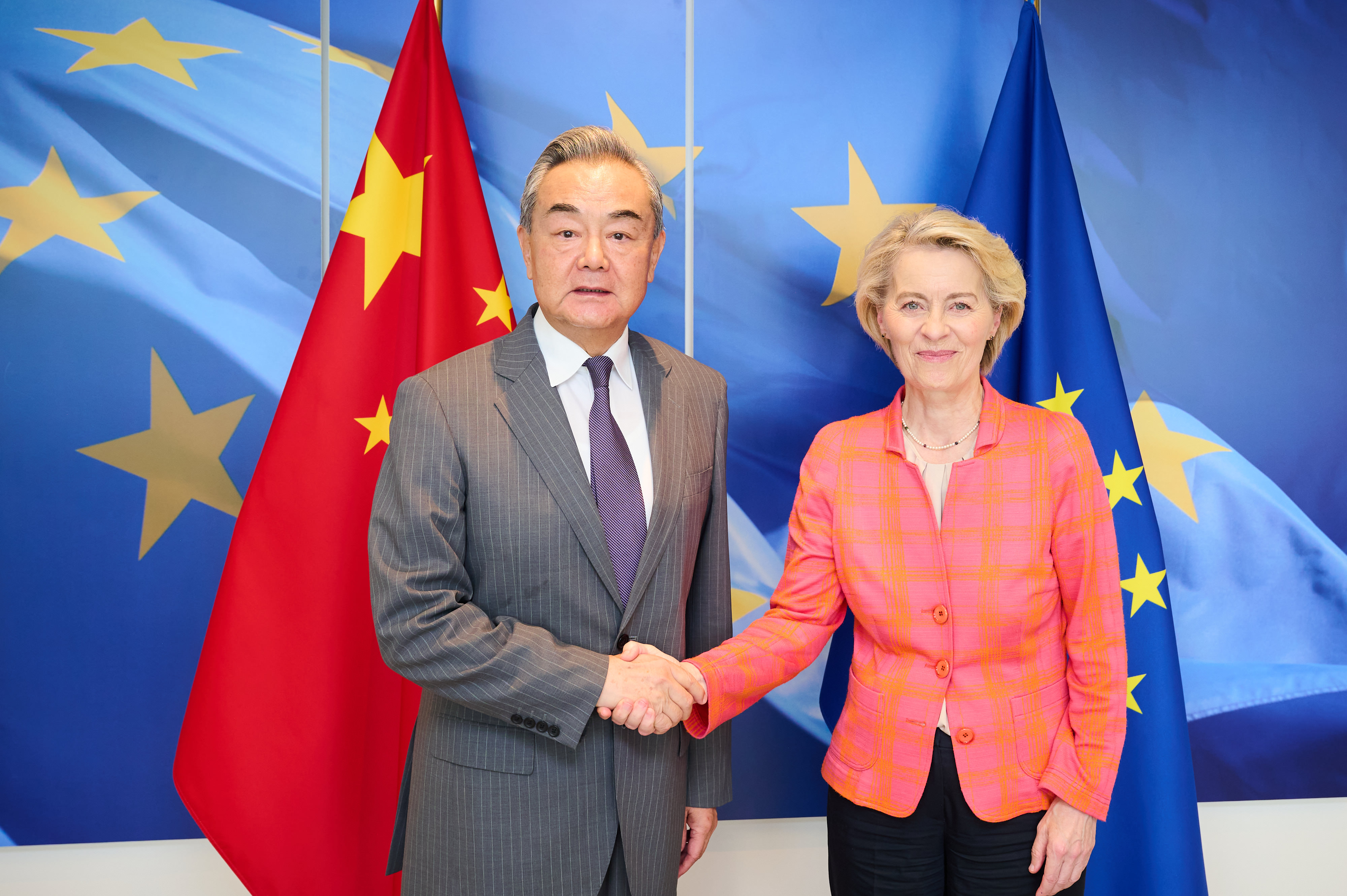
Ursula von der Leyen with Chinese Foreign Minister Wang Yi in Brussels, 4 July 2025

In a meeting with Kaja Kallas in July 2025, Chinese Foreign Minister Wang Yi said that China does not want Russia to lose the war in Ukraine. According to European diplomats, China is concerned that the United States would focus more on Asia once the conflict in Europe ends.

On 15 July 2025, Kallas and the foreign ministers of the EU member states decided not to take any action against Israel over alleged Israeli war crimes in the Gaza war and settler violence in the West Bank. The proposed sanctions against Israel included suspending the EU-Israel Association Agreement, suspending visa-free travel, or blocking imports from Israeli settlements. Israel considered the EU's decision not to impose sanctions on Israel as a diplomatic victory. Palestinian Foreign Minister Varsen Aghabekian criticised the decision, saying, "It's shocking and disappointing, because everything is crystal clear. ... The whole world has been seeing what is happening in Gaza. The killing, the atrocities, the war crimes."

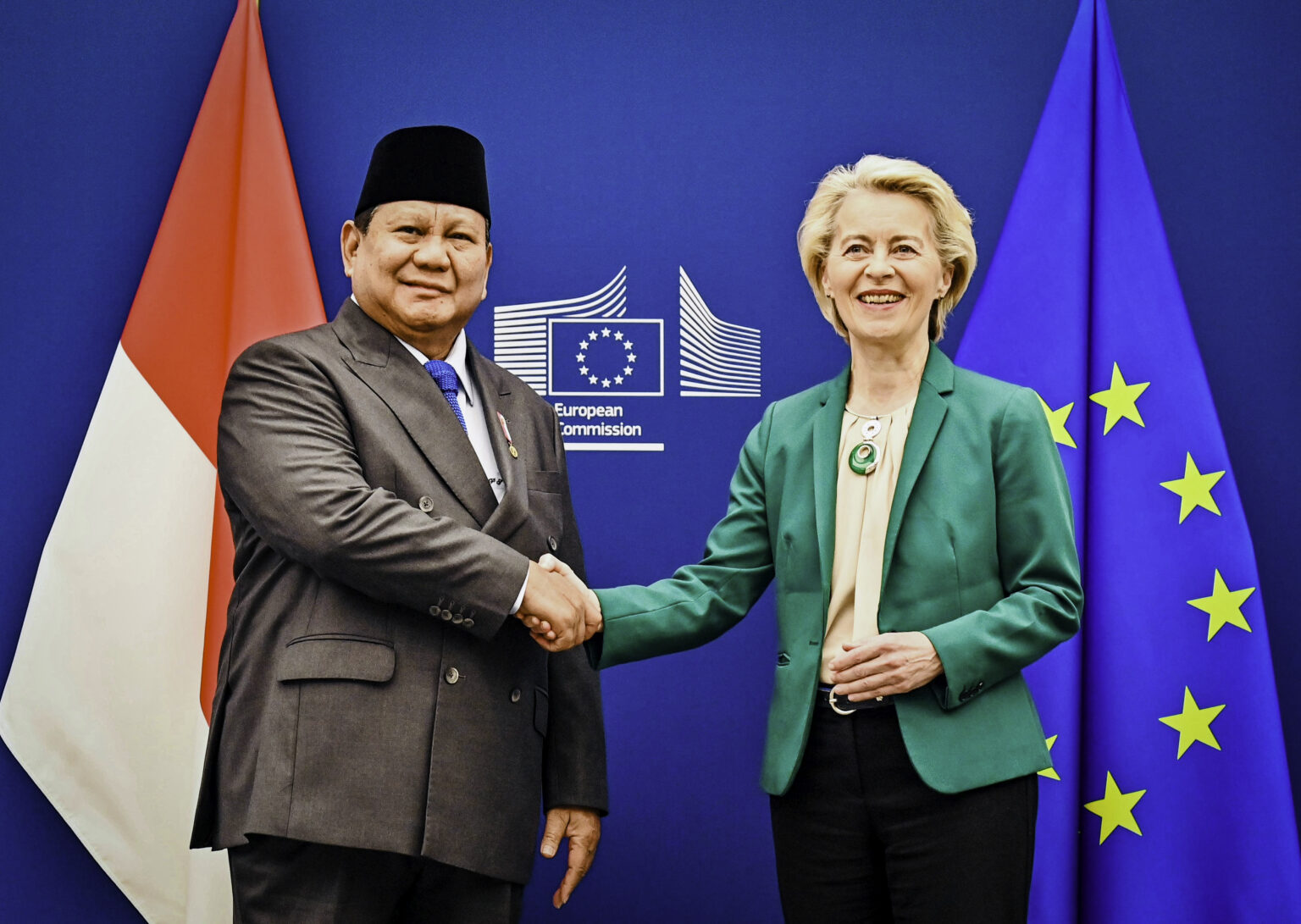
Indonesian President Prabowo Subianto with Ursula von der Leyen at the Berlaymont building, 13 July 2025

In September 2025, US President Trump asked the EU to impose 100 % tariffs on China and India to punish them for buying Russian oil and de facto financing Russia's invasion of Ukraine. Kaja Kallas expressed support for enhancing trade and security ties between the EU and India, while criticising India's close cooperation with Russia, including its participation in the Zapad 2025 military exercise.

On 28 October 2025, Kaja Kallas and Hadja Lahbib released a joint statement calling the RSF's seizure of El Fasher a "dangerous turning point" in the Sudanese Civil War and condemning the "brutality" of targeting civilians based on ethnicity. They urged immediate de-escalation, adherence to international humanitarian law, and safe, unhindered humanitarian access.

On 9 January 2026, during a historic visit to Damascus, von der Leyen met with Syrian President Ahmed al-Sharaa and announced a substantial financial assistance package of approximately €620 million, to be disbursed in 2026 and 2027. This visit marked a significant shift in EU-Syria relations following the fall of the Assad regime in late 2024. During her stay, von der Leyen described the ongoing clashes in Aleppo between the Syrian government and the Kurdish-led SDF as "worrying".

In January 2026, von der Leyen strongly condemned the violent crackdown on widespread anti-government protests in Iran. Responding to reports of escalating casualties, she characterised the situation as "horrifying."

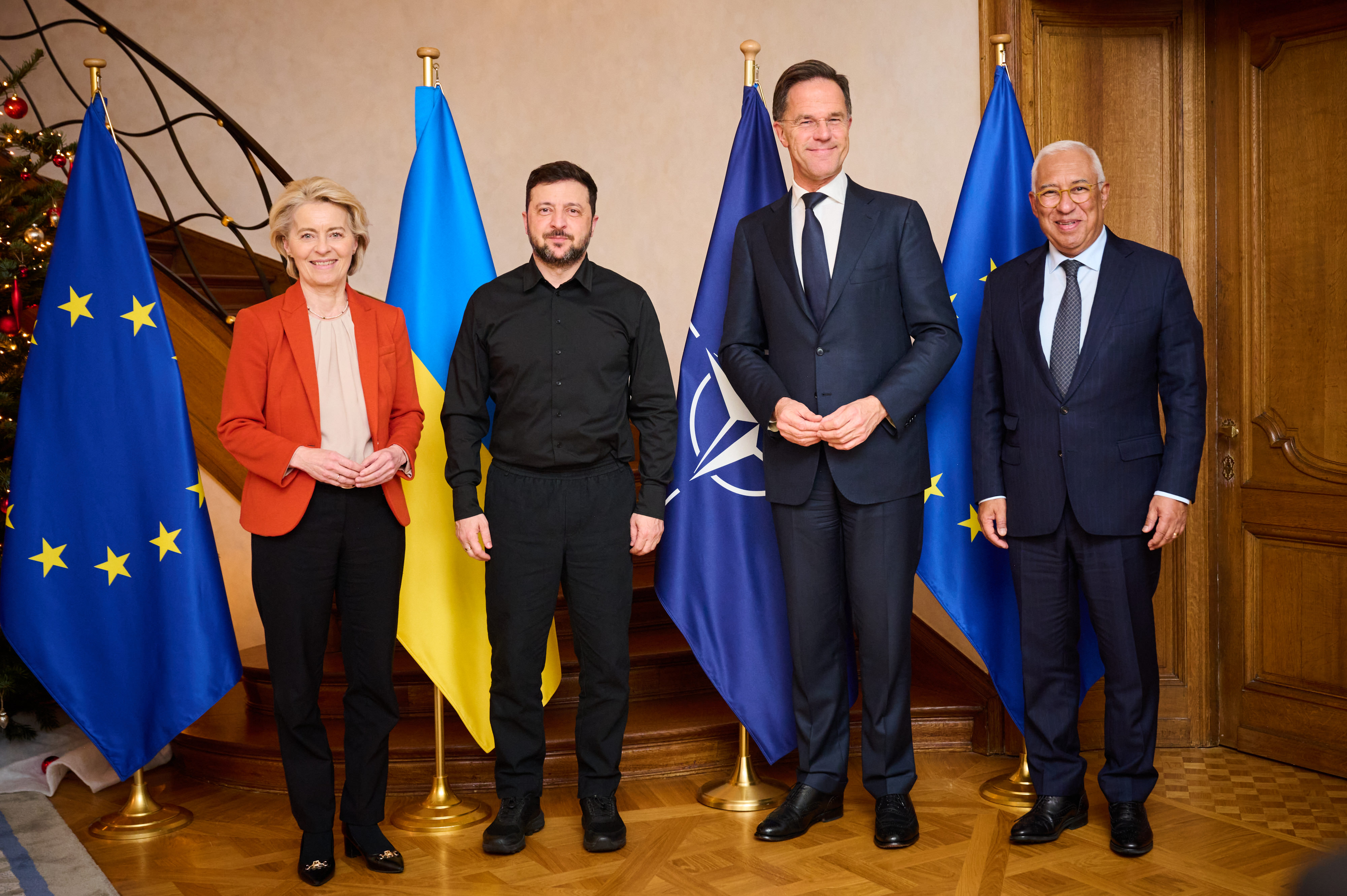
From left to right: Ursula von der Leyen, Volodymyr Zelenskyy, Mark Rutte, and António Costa in Brussels, 8 December 2025

On 1 March 2026, von der Leyen called for a "credible transition" in Iran following the start of a joint U.S.-Israeli military campaign that resulted in the death of Supreme Leader Ali Khamenei.

In March 2026, von der Leyen declared that the traditional "rules-based" international order is finished, urging the EU to adopt a more interest-driven, realistic foreign policy in response to global instability. Addressing the U.S.-Israeli strikes on Iran, she argued 'no tears should be shed' for the Iranian regime, despite noting security risks to Europe. This rhetoric and her dismissal of the rules-based framework prompted criticism from several EU capitals and threatened a no-confidence motion from S&D lawmakers.

=== Defense industry ===
On 4 March 2025, Ursula von der Leyen announced the EU's €800 billion (US$840 billion) defence investment plan "ReArm Europe". She suggested that the European Union might need to ease its fiscal rules regarding national debt to facilitate increased defence spending by member states.

=== Trade ===
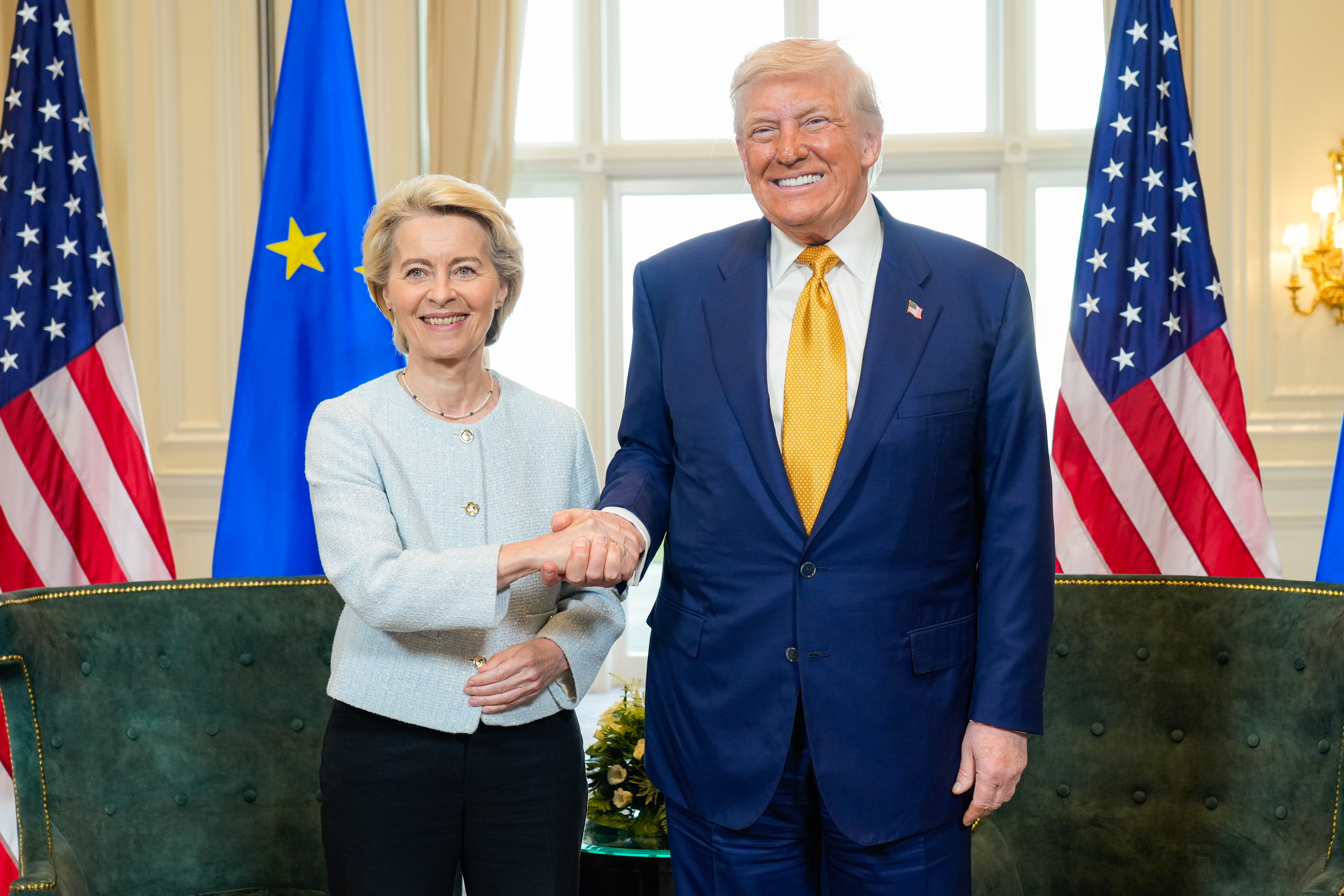
Von der Leyen with US President Donald Trump in Scotland, 27 July 2025

In May 2025, Qatar threatened to halt LNG deliveries to Europe if the European Union continued with proposed regulations linking trade to human rights and environmental standards.

On 27 July 2025, the United States and the European Union concluded a trade agreement, providing for 15% tariffs on European exports. The deal was announced by US President Donald Trump and Ursula von der Leyen, at Turnberry, Scotland. European states committed to US$750 billion in energy purchases and US$600 billion in additional investments in the United States.

In July 2025, Indonesian President Prabowo Subianto and Ursula von der Leyen reached a political agreement on the Indonesia-EU Comprehensive Economic Partnership Agreement (CEPA). Following a decade of negotiations, the substantive conclusion of the deal was signed in September 2025.

Ursula von der Leyen and the leaders of the Mercosur countries (Argentina, Brazil, Paraguay, and Uruguay) formally signed the European Union–Mercosur free trade agreement on 17 January 2026, in Asunción, Paraguay. This milestone marked the culmination of over 25 years of negotiations aimed at establishing one of the world's largest free trade zones.

In October 2025, von der Leyen announced a strategy to reduce the European Union’s reliance on China for critical raw materials, including rare earth elements. This initiative was in response to China's export restrictions on these essential commodities, which pose potential risks to the EU's industrial manufacturing and technological innovation.

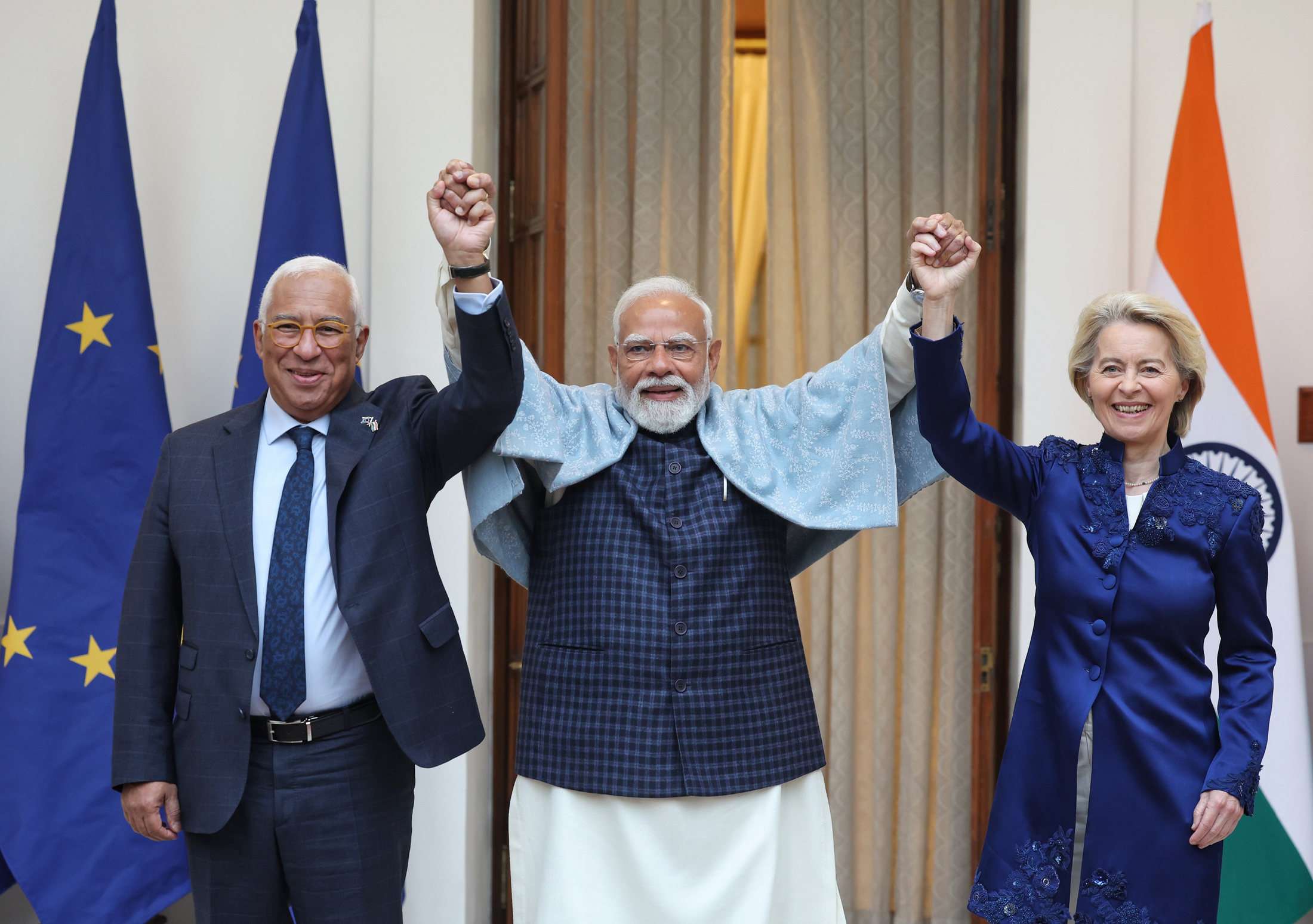
António Costa, Narendra Modi, and Ursula von der Leyen during the formal ceremony of the treaty's signing, 27 January 2026

In January 2026, India and the European Union concluded a landmark India–European Union Free Trade Agreement, aimed at eliminating tariffs on over 90% of goods to strengthen economic and strategic ties. Ursula von der Leyen called it the "mother of all deals".

=== Immigration ===
In February 2025, Polish Prime Minister Donald Tusk told Ursula von der Leyen that Poland would not implement the EU Migration Pact, i.e. the mandatory relocation of 30,000 asylum seekers or the payment of €600 million, and recalled that Poland had accepted a large number of Ukrainian refugees.

In March 2025, Poland suspended the right to apply for asylum at the Belarus-Poland border, a decision supported by the European Commission.

On 27 January 2026, Ursula von der Leyen and Indian Prime Minister Narendra Modi signed a mobility and migration partnership agreement alongside a free trade agreement in New Delhi to expand legal pathways to the EU for Indian students and skilled workers. According to von der Leyen, this agreement is crucial for addressing long-term labor shortages in the European market by easing visa processes.

In June 2026, amid the Ukrainian conscription crisis, von der Leyen signaled plans to alter the terms of the Temporary Protection Directive, an emergency mechanism granting immediate protection to displaced persons fleeing the Russo-Ukrainian War, writing to bloc leaders that future extensions must not undermine Ukraine's self-defense capacity. Following these discussions, on 26 June 2026, the European Commission formally proposed extending temporary protection for displaced Ukrainians until March 2028. At the direct request of the Ukrainian government, the proposal introduced a restriction excluding newly arriving Ukrainian men aged 23 to 60 subject to mobilization from automatic temporary protection status. Under Ukraine’s martial law, this age cohort is prohibited from leaving the country.

EU Migration Commissioner Magnus Brunner oversaw the entry into application of the New Pact on Migration and Asylum on 12 June 2026, describing the comprehensive reform as the beginning of a broader operational implementation process. He emphasized strict compliance with the rules, noting that the pact establishes a legally binding European framework for all member states, with the Commission monitoring national implementation plans.

=== Multiannual Financial Framework 2028-34 ===
On 16 July 2025, the Commission proposed a draft of the Multiannual Financial Framework for the years 2028-34, reorganising its structure into four pillars (National and regional partnership plans, Competitiveness Fund, Global Europe Fund and European public administration) and increasing the overall spending as a percent of gross national income of the member states combined from 1.05% to 1.26%. The Commission also included new sources of EU's own revenues in the draft budget.

== 2025 votes of confidence ==
In July 2025, von der Leyen survived a vote of no confidence, with 360 MEPs against and 175 in favour. EPP, S&D, Renew Europe, Greens/EFA and parts of ECR supported her, while PfE, ESN, The Left and parts of ECR opposed her.

In October, von der Leyen survived another two votes of no confidence, with 378 MEPs against and 179 in favour on the first one, and with 383 MEPs against and 133 in favour on the second one.
