= Clean Industrial Deal =

European Commission policy

The Clean Industrial Deal (CID) is a European Commission action programme for competitiveness in the face of elevated energy prices and the climate crisis. It was published in February 2025.

The CID's aims are

- lower energy costs: 100GW of renewables every year until 2030, 32% electrification rate.
- clean product demand via a public procurement framework
- funding via state aid framework, EU Innovation Fund, and a new Industrial Decarbonisation Bank
- circularity: Increase circular material use to 24% by 2030, EU critical raw material data centre.

On the same day as the European Commission proposed the Clean Industrial Deal, it tabled an Action Plan for Affordable Energy, purporting to save 260 billion euros per year by 2040.

A year after the announcement of the deal, transparency non-profit Corporate Europe Observatory, released a report showing that the policy was widely supported by dirty industries that were likely to benefit from relaxation of environmental regulations. Over the course of the year, they documented over 750 meetings with industrial lobbyists.

== See also ==
- European Green Deal
- 2021-2023 global energy crisis
