= Fleur Breteau =

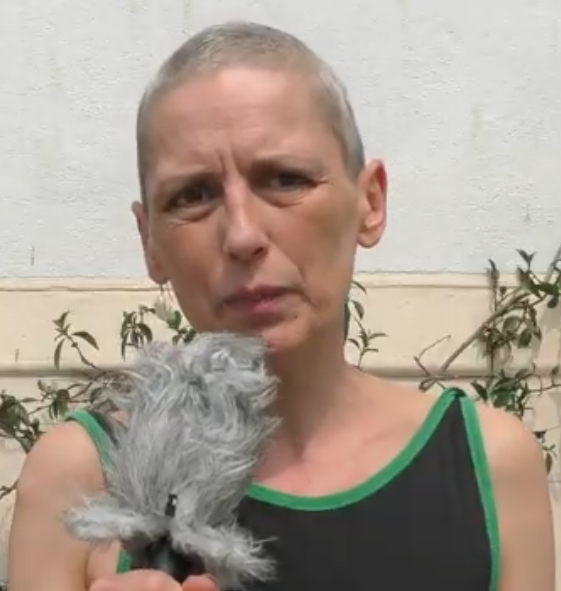
- Breteau in 2025
- Born: 1975 (age 50–51); Paris, France
- Occupations: Writer, activist

Fleur Breteau (born 1975) is a French writer and activist known for her advocacy against the controversial "Duplomb law" in 2025, which in its original form would have reintroduced the use of acetamiprid, a neonicotinoid pesticide that is banned in France since 2020.

Breteau launched the Cancer Anger (Cancer Colère) collective in early 2025 to advocate against the law when it was approved by the Senate. When the National Assembly approved the law in the summer, Breteau helped promote a citizens' petition opposing the law by making a public spectacle within the gallery, shouting: "You are supporters of cancer ... and we will make it known". Weeks later, the Constitutional Council struck the provision in the law allowing use of acetamiprid, after it determined that the provision would violate guarantees afforded by the country's environmental charter.

== Activism ==
In January 2025, Breteau was being treated at the Institut Gustave Roussy for her second case of breast cancer, while the Senate, the upper house of parliament, discussed the Duplomb law. She recalled becoming "overwhelmed with anger" when senators approved the law. She founded the Cancer Anger collective the following day, with an intention "To politicize cancer by making it visible." The National Assembly, the parliament's lower house, approved the legislation in July. When members of parliament applauded themselves for the effort, Breteau shouted within the chambers: "You are supporters of cancer ... and we will make it known." The spectacle helped propel a citizens' petition to repeal the legislation to over two million signatories; Le Monde described her as "instrumental" in the petition's success.

Also in July, alongside several parents of children exposed to pesticides, Breteau submitted a petition to the National Assembly which calls for a ban on synthetic pesticides. By late July, twenty active members comprised the Cancer Anger collective, which included both current and former patients and caregivers, and it had over 400 membership requests. Weeks later, the Constitutional Council struck the provision of the Duplomb law that would have allowed the use of acetamiprid, after determining that it would violate the "right to live in a balanced and healthy environment" afforded by the country's environmental charter.

Breteau's book, Cancer Colère, tells of her experiences with cancer and her transition into an activist against pesticides as a founder of the Cancer Anger collective; it was published in 2026 by Éditions du Seuil.

== Personal life ==
One of three sisters, Breteau was born in Paris in 1975 and later moved to Levallois-Perret. When she was eleven years old, she sent a letter to the president of France to complain of the disparity between the price of a sack of rice sent to Ethiopia and the prize money received by a footballer in that year's FIFA World Cup finals. Breteau has campaigned against pesticides with Greenpeace since the early 2000s.

Breteau previously worked a communications job at PlayStation in London until she became "fed up enriching a pension fund for American retirees". She then produced her own ready-to-wear clothing line and then co-managed a sex shop for six years and during that time had her first episode of breast cancer. Her 2017 book L'amour, accessoires, published by Éditions Verticales, recounts her experiences working at the sex shop. In 2019, she was writer-in-residence at Les plumes de Léon, an organisation that promotes literature in the Dordogne region. Breteau was diagnosed with another breast cancer in August 2024, her second case in four years, on the same day that her friend died of cancer. She began chemotherapy in January, while the Duplomb law was being discussed in the Senate. Her cancer has impacted her income from freelancing as a corporate social responsibility consultant.
