= Stéphane Braunschweig =

French theatre director

Stéphane André Braunschweig (born 5 July 1964) is a French theatre director.

== Life and career ==
Born in Paris, the son of a lawyer and a psychoanalyst mother, Braunschweig studied at the lycée Victor-Duruy, in Paris. After studying philosophy at the École normale supérieure de Saint-Cloud, in 1987 he joined the Théâtre National de Chaillot school directed by Antoine Vitez, where he received theatre training for three years. In 1991, he received the Syndicat de la critique Revelation Award for his trilogy entitled Les Hommes de neige.

He was then appointed director of the National Theatre of Strasbourg and the École Supérieure du TNS from 1 July 2000 to 30 June 2008. On 1 January 2009, he became an associated artist at the Théâtre national de la Colline of which he became director, succeeding Alain Françon in January 2010.

On 15 January 2016, Braunschweig was appointed director of the Théâtre national de l’Odéon. In 2017, he directed the premiere of Sebastian Fagerlund's Autumn Sonata.

== Author ==
- 2007 : Petites portes, grands paysages, Actes Sud.

== Awards ==
- 2013 : Chevalier de l'ordre de la Légion d'honneur.
- 2014 : Officier de l'ordre des Arts et des Lettres.
