= Autumn Sonata (opera) =

Opera by Sebastian Fagerlund

Autumn Sonata (Höstsonaten) is an opera in two acts by composer Sebastian Fagerlund, with a Swedish libretto by Gunilla Hemming based on the screenplay for the 1978 film of the same name by Ingmar Bergman.

The opera was commissioned by the Finnish National Opera and premiered on 8 September 2017, directed by Stéphane Braunschweig and conducted by John Storgårds. Three of the performances of the premiere production were recorded by BIS for a live recording that was released in September 2018. In Autumn 2017 the opera was also streamed in HD on the OperaVision platform in collaboration with the Finnish Broadcasting Company.

On 27 October 2018. the Finnish National Opera and the premiere production cast performed a concertante version of Autumn Sonata at the Baltic Sea Festival in the Berwald Hallen in Stockholm, Sweden. The performance was conducted by Dalia Stasevska. The opera production was revived at the Malmö Opera in Sweden with a partly new cast including Charlotte Hellekant in the leading role as the mother and Fredrik Zetterström as Viktor. The Swedish premiere on 13 September 2019 was conducted by Patrik Ringborg. On 18 October 2019, Malmö Opera brought the revived production to Hong Kong World Cultures Festival for three performances between 18 and 20 October 2019. The premiere production of Autumn Sonata was revived at the Finnish National Opera between 15 November and 12 December 2019. The original cast was the same, except for the role of Eva, sung by Ingela Brimberg.

Autumn Sonata is published by Edition Peters.

== Roles ==
Roles, voice types, premiere cast
Role	Voice type	Premiere cast, 8 September 2017 Conductor: John Storgårds
Helena, the younger daughter	soprano	Helena Juntunen
Eva, the older daughter	soprano	Erika Sunnegårdh
Charlotte, the mother	mezzo-soprano	Anne Sofie von Otter
Viktor, Eva's husband	baritone	Tommi Hakala
Leonardo, Charlotte's dead lover and companion	bass	Nicholas Söderlund

== Reception ==
Guy Dammann gave a 5-star review in the Financial Times: "Striking, Superb!"

Camilla Lundberg in the Swedish newspaper Dagens Nyheter wrote: "A new opera has rarely struck so deeply" [Sällan har en opera träffat så djupt].

Göran Forsling wrote in Seen and Heard International: "Sebastian Fagerlund has created a colorful score that powerfully comments, underlines and punctuates the text. The music is not melodious, but it is expressive and full of feeling."

Reviewer Martin Lim wrote in the South China Morning Post: "Opera Autumn Sonata, adapted from the original Swedish film, is an explosion of musical color ...".

Andrew Mellor reviewed the CD recording of Autumn Sonata in Gramophone: "Fagerlund's brooding, tension-ridden score is excellent at differentiating between Charlotte (her music all uppity and precious) and Eva (lost in a sea of loneliness and emotional damage) and grinding those elements together to deliver the opera's sucker punches."
