= Anne Sofie von Otter =

Swedish mezzo-soprano (born 1955)

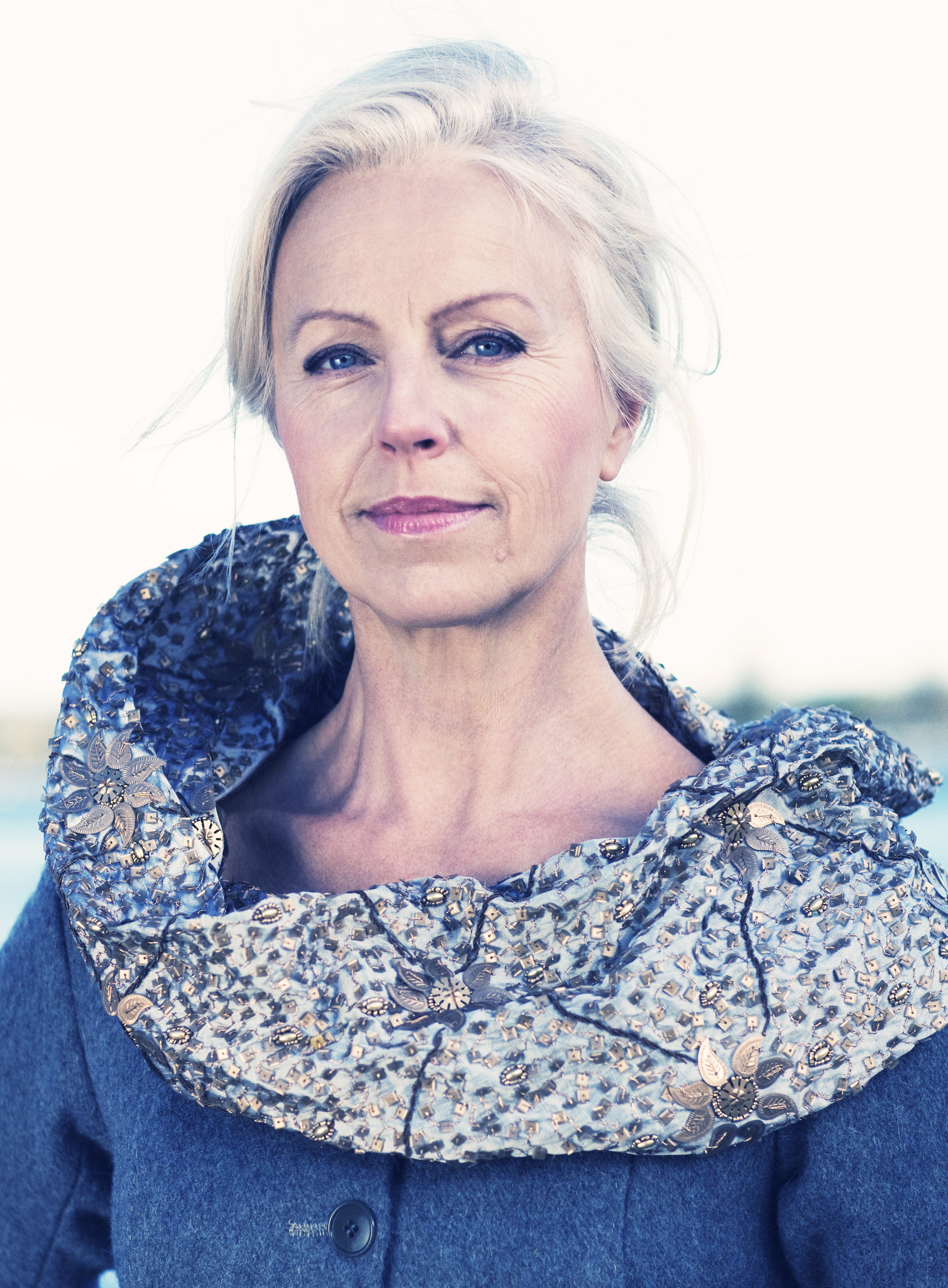
- von Otter in 2011
- Born: 9 May 1955 (age 71); Stockholm, Sweden
- Education: Guildhall School of Music and Drama
- Occupation: Singer (mezzo-soprano)
- Spouse: Benny Fredriksson (m. 1989; died 2018)
- Children: 2
- Father: Göran von Otter
- Website: annesofievonotter.com

Anne Sofie von Otter (born 9 May 1955) is a Swedish mezzo-soprano. Her repertoire encompasses lieder, operas, oratorios and also rock and pop songs.

== Early life ==
Von Otter was born in Stockholm, Sweden. Her father was Göran von Otter, a Swedish diplomat in Berlin during World War II. She grew up in Bonn, London and Stockholm. She studied in Stockholm and at the Guildhall School of Music and Drama in London, where her teachers included Vera Rózsa.

From 1983 to 1985, she was an ensemble member of the Basel Opera, where she made her professional operatic début as Alcina in Haydn's Orlando paladino. She made her Royal Opera House, Covent Garden, début in 1985 and her La Scala debut in 1987. Her Metropolitan Opera début was in December 1988 as Cherubino in The Marriage of Figaro.

== Career ==
Her recording of Grieg songs won the 1993 Gramophone Record of the Year, the first time in the award's history that it had gone to a song recording. In 2001, she released her album with Elvis Costello, For the Stars, for which she won an Edison Award. She was awarded the Grammy Award for Best Classical Vocal Solo in 2015 for her album of French songs, Douce France. She is a regular recital and recording partner with Swedish pianist Bengt Forsberg.

In 2006, von Otter sang the Evangelist in the premiere of Sven-David Sandström's Ordet – en passion. Other work in contemporary music has included singing the role of The Woman in Senza Sangue of Péter Eötvös. In other media, she appeared in the film A Late Quartet.

In 2007, she released an album of music written by composers imprisoned in the Nazi ghetto of Theresienstadt concentration camp (also known as Terezin) before their transportation to the death camp of Auschwitz. She collaborated on this project with Christian Gerhaher (baritone) and chamber musicians. She has stated that the material has special personal meaning for her as her father had attempted unsuccessfully during the war to spread information that he had received from SS officer Kurt Gerstein about the Nazi death camps.

In 2016, von Otter sang Leonora in the world premiere of Thomas Adès' The Exterminating Angel, and again in 2017 at the Royal Opera House, Covent Garden. She created the principal role of Charlotte in Sebastian Fagerlund's 2017 opera Autumn Sonata, based on the 1979 film by Ingmar Bergman at the Finnish National Opera in Helsinki conducted by John Storgårds.

== Family life ==
Von Otter was married to Benny Fredriksson from 1989 until his suicide on 17 March 2018. He was an actor and managing director of The Stockholm House of Culture, including the Stadsteater (Stockholm City Theatre). The couple had two children. She lives in the capital Stockholm.

== Awards and honours ==
- 1995: appointed Hovsångerska by King Carl XVI Gustaf of Sweden
- 2003: Rolf Schock Prize in the musical arts category
- 2013: Honorary Degree, University Pierre and Marie Curie, Paris

== Discography ==
=== Selective charting albums ===
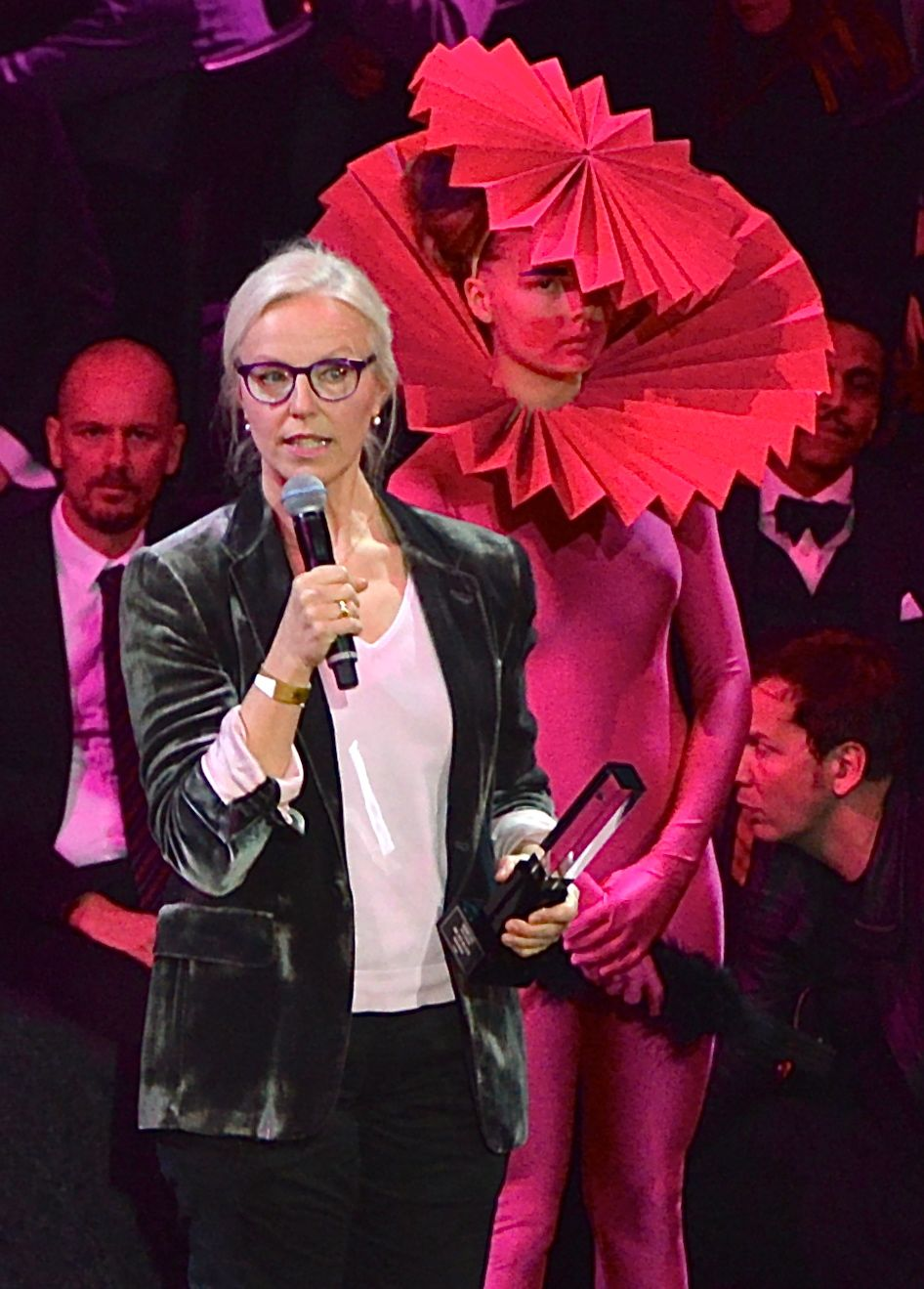
von Otter in 2013

(Peak positions in Sverigetopplistan, the Swedish national record chart)

Year	Album	Peak positions				
Year	Album	SWE	AUS	GER	NED	NOR
1993	Grieg Songs (DG)	46	–	–	–	–
1994	Speak Low	25	–	–	–	–
1999	Home for Christmas	16	–	–	72	–
2001	For the Stars (Anne Sofie von Otter meets Elvis Costello)	25	81	59	80	33
2006	I Let the Music Speak	13	–	–	63	–
2006	Noël (Anne Sofie von Otter & Bengt Forsberg)	59	–	–	–	–
2007	Terezín / Theresienstadt (Anne Sofie von Otter / Bengt Forsberg)	56	–	–	–	–
2010	Ombre de mon amant	32	–	–	–	–
2010	Love Songs (Anne Sofie von Otter / Brad Mehldau)	34	–	–	–	–
2013	Douce France	58	–	–	–	–

== Recordings ==
=== Lieder and songs ===
- Alban Berg: Sieben frühe Lieder & Der Wein conducted by Claudio Abbado (1995) Deutsche Grammophon
- Hector Berlioz: Mélodies with Cord Garben (piano) (1994) and Les nuits d'été conducted by James Levine (1995) Deutsche Grammophon
  - Les nuits d'été conducted by Marc Minkowski (2011) Naïve
- Johannes Brahms: Lieder with Bengt Forsberg (piano) (1990) Deutsche Grammophon
- Cécile Chaminade: Mots d'amour with Bengt Forsberg (piano) (2001) Deutsche Grammophon
- Edvard Grieg: Songs/Lieder with Bengt Forsberg (piano) (1993) Deutsche Grammophon
- Erich Wolfgang Korngold: Rendezvous with Korngold with Bengt Forsberg (piano) & Friends (1999) Deutsche Grammophon
- Ingvar Lidholm: Songs and Chamber Music conducted by Björn Sjögren (1996) Caprice Records
- Gustav Mahler: Des Knaben Wunderhorn with Thomas Quasthoff conducted by Claudio Abbado (1999) Deutsche Grammophon
  - Kindertotenlieder conducted by Pierre Boulez (2004) Deutsche Grammophon
- Maurice Ravel: Shéhérazade conducted by Pierre Boulez (2002) Deutsche Grammophon
- Arnold Schoenberg: Gurre-Lieder conducted by Simon Rattle (2002) EMI
- Franz Schubert: Lieder, with Bengt Forsberg (piano) (1997) and Lieder with Orchestra conducted by Claudio Abbado (2003) Deutsche Grammophon
- Robert Schumann: Frauen-Liebe und Leben with Bengt Forsberg (piano) (1995) Deutsche Grammophon
- Jean Sibelius: Anne Sofie von Otter sings Sibelius with Bengt Forsberg (piano) BIS
- Kurt Weill: Speak Low: Songs by Kurt Weill conducted by John Eliot Gardiner (1994) Deutsche Grammophon
- Hugo Wolf: Spanisches Liederbuch with Olaf Bär (baritone) and Geoffrey Parsons (piano) (1995) EMI
- Various: Boldemann Gefors Hillborg conducted by Kent Nagano (2008) Deutsche Grammophon
  - La Bonne chanson – French Chamber Songs with Bengt Forsberg (piano) and others (1996) Deutsche Grammophon
  - Brahms / Schumann with Barbara Bonney (soprano), Kurt Streit (tenor), Olaf Bär (baritone), Helmut Deutsch and Bengt Forsberg (piano duet) (1994) EMI
  - Douce France – classical French songs (disc 1) and chansons (disc 2) with Bengt Forsberg (piano) and others (2013) Naive
  - Folksongs with Bengt Forsberg (piano) (2000) Deutsche Grammophon
  - Lieder / Mélodies by Beethoven Meyerbeer Spohr with Melvyn Tan (fortepiano) (2001) Archiv
  - Lieder by Wolf and Mahler with Ralf Gothóni (piano) (1989) Deutsche Grammophon
  - Love's Twilight – Late Romantic Songs by Berg Korngold Strauss with Bengt Forsberg (piano) (1994) Deutsche Grammophon
  - Mahler Zemlinsky Lieder conducted by John Eliot Gardiner (1996) Deutsche Grammophon
  - Mozart – Haydn: Songs & Canzonettas with Melvyn Tan (fortepiano) (1995) Archiv
  - Music for a While – Baroque Melodies (2004) Deutsche Grammophon
  - Terezín / Theresienstadt with Bengt Forsberg (piano), Christian Gerhaher, Gerold Huber (piano) and others (2007) Deutsche Grammophon
  - Watercolours – Swedish Songs with Bengt Forsberg (piano) (2003) Deutsche Grammophon
  - Wings in the Night – Swedish Songs with Bengt Forsberg (piano) (1996) Deutsche Grammophon

=== Complete operas ===
- Bartók: Bluebeard's Castle conducted by Bernard Haitink (1996) EMI
- Berlioz: La Damnation de Faust conducted by Myung-whun Chung (1998) Deutsche Grammophon
- Bizet: Carmen conducted by Philippe Jordan (2003) BBC/Arte
- Sebastian Fagerlund: Autumn Sonata (opera) conducted by John Storgårds (2018) BIS
- Gluck: Alceste conducted by Sir John Eliot Gardiner (1990) Philips
  - Iphigénie en Aulide conducted by Sir John Eliot Gardiner (1990) Erato
  - Orphée et Eurydice conducted by Sir John Eliot Gardiner (1989) EMI
- Handel: Agrippina conducted by Sir John Eliot Gardiner (1997) Philips
  - Ariodante conducted by Marc Minkowski (1999) Archiv
  - Giulio Cesare conducted by Marc Minkowski (2003) Archiv
  - Hercules conducted by Marc Minkowski (2002) Archiv
  - Serse by conducted by William Christie (2004) Virgin Classics
- Humperdinck: Hänsel und Gretel conducted by Jeffrey Tate(1989/1990) EMI
- Massenet: Werther conducted by Kent Nagano (1997) Elektra
- Monteverdi: L'incoronazione di Poppea conducted by John Eliot Gardiner (1996) Archiv
  - L'Orfeo conducted by John Eliot Gardiner (1987) Archiv
- Mozart: La clemenza di Tito conducted by John Eliot Gardiner (1993) Deutsche Grammophon
  - Così fan tutte conducted by Georg Solti (1996) Decca
  - Idomeneo conducted by John Eliot Gardiner (1991) Deutsche Grammophon
  - Le nozze di Figaro conducted by James Levine (1992) Deutsche Grammophon
- Purcell: Dido and Aeneas conducted by Trevor Pinnock (1989) Archiv
- Rachmaninoff: Aleko conducted by Neeme Järvi (1997) Deutsche Grammophon
- Richard Strauss: Ariadne auf Naxos conducted by Giuseppe Sinopoli (2002) Deutsche Grammophon
  - Der Rosenkavalier conducted by Bernard Haitink (1991) EMI
  - Der Rosenkavalier conducted by Carlos Kleiber (1995) Deutsche Grammophon DVD only
- Igor Stravinsky: The Rake's Progress conducted by John Eliot Gardiner (1999) Deutsche Grammophon
- Tchaikovsky: Eugene Onegin conducted by James Levine (1988) Deutsche Grammophon

=== Aria recordings ===
- Anne Sofie von Otter sings Offenbach, conducted by Marc Minkowski – Deutsche Grammophon
- Baroque Arias by Handel, Monteverdi, Roman and Telemann, with the Drottningholm Baroque Ensemble – Proprius
- Ombre de mon amant, French baroque arias conducted by William Christie – Archiv
- Opera Arias by Gluck, Haydn and Mozart, conducted by Trevor Pinnock – Archiv

=== Oratorios, symphonies, etc ===
- Bach: St Matthew Passion English Baroque Soloists, Sir John Eliot Gardiner
  - St Matthew Passion Chicago Symphony, Sir Georg Solti; Kiri Te Kanawa, Anthony Rolfe Johnson, Tom Krause, Hans Peter Blochwitz, Glen Ellyn Children's Chorus, Chicago Symphony Chorus
- Beethoven: Symphony No. 9, with Luba Orgonasova, Anthony Rolfe Johnson, Gilles Cachemaille, the Monteverdi Choir and the Orchestre Revolutionaire et Romantique, conducted by Sir John Eliot Gardiner
- Berlioz: L'Enfance du Christ, Gilles Cachemaille, Jules Bastin, José Van Dam, Monteverdi Choir, Orchestre de l'Opéra de Lyon, conducted by John Eliot Gardiner - Erato 1988
- Maurice Duruflé: "Requiem", conducted by Michel Plasson – EMI
- Elgar: The Dream of Gerontius, with Alastair Miles and David Rendall, conducted by Sir Colin Davis
- Handel: Jephtha, with Michael Chance, Lynne Dawson and Stephen Varcoe, with the English Baroque Soloists conducted by Sir John Eliot Gardiner
  - Messiah, with Arleen Auger, Michael Chance, Howard Crook and John Tomlinson, with Trevor Pinnock and The English Concert
  - Messiah, with Sylvia McNair, Michael Chance, Jerry Hadley and Robert Lloyd, with the Academy of St Martin in the Fields conducted by Sir Neville Marriner
- Mauricio Kagel: Sankt-Bach-Passion, conducted by the composer – Naïve
- Mahler: Symphony No. 3, conducted by Pierre Boulez – Deutsche Grammophon
- Mozart: Requiem: Barbara Bonney, Anne Sofie von Otter, English Baroque Soloists, Monteverdi Choir, conducted by John Eliot Gardiner – Archiv
  - Great Mass in C minor: Barbara Bonney, Anne Sofie von Otter, English Baroque Soloists, Monteverdi Choir, conducted by Sir John Eliot Gardiner
- Franz Schubert: Rosamunde with the Chamber Orchestra of Europe, conducted by Claudio Abbado
- Camille Saint-Saëns, Oratorio de Noël, Royal Opera Theater, Orchestra, The Michael Chamber Choir, conducted by Anders Eby. CD Proprius Musik AB 1994

=== Other music ===
- Home for Christmas, classical works and popular tunes for Christmas (1999) Deutsche Grammophon
- For the Stars, a collection of rock and pop songs (by the likes of Brian Wilson, Andersson–Ulvaeus and Lennon–McCartney), with Elvis Costello and Svante Henryson (2001) Deutsche Grammophon
- Peter Sculthorpe: Island Dreaming, with the Brodsky Quartet (2001) Challenge Records
- I Let the Music Speak – Songs of ABBA including "Money, Money, Money" and "The Winner Takes It All" (2006) Deutsche Grammophon
- Noel, classical Christmas music with Bengt Forsberg (2006) Deutsche Grammophon
- Love Songs, with Brad Mehldau (2010) Naïve
- Ottorino Respighi: Il tramonto, with the Brodsky Quartet – Vanguard
- The Metropolitan Opera Gala 1991, Deutsche Grammophon DVD, 00440-073-4582
- James Levine's 25th Anniversary Metropolitan Opera Gala (1996), Deutsche Grammophon DVD, B0004602-09
