= Birgitta von Otter =

Swedish journalist, author and debater

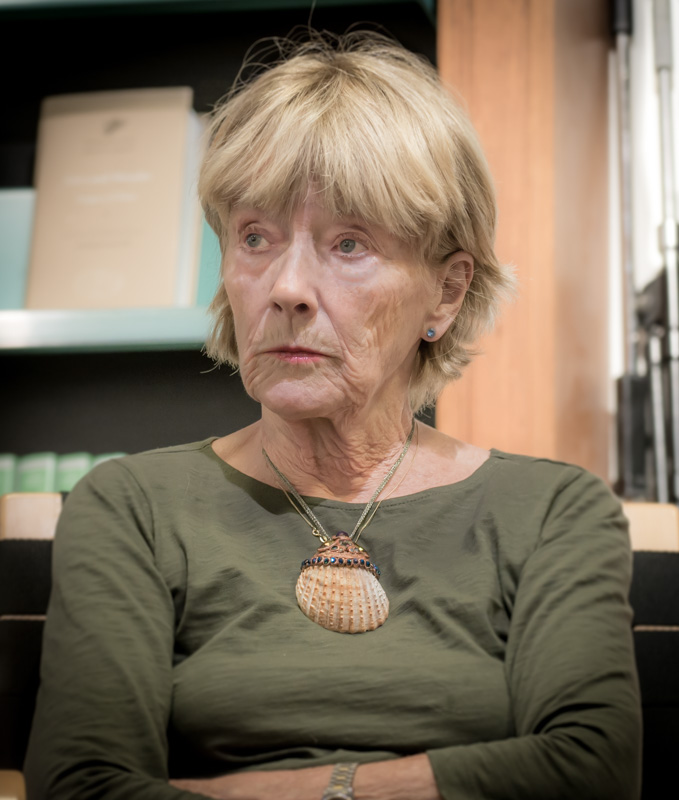
- Von Otter in 2016
- Born: 7 January 1939 (age 87); Budapest, Hungary
- Occupations: Journalist, writer
- Spouses: Gunnar Hörstadius (m. 1962; div. 1970); Kjell-Olof Feldt (m. 1970; died 2025)
- Children: 3

Ebba Birgitta von Otter (born 7 January 1939) is a Swedish journalist, author and debater.

== Early life ==
Von Otter was born during her parents' stay in Budapest, Hungary. She is the elder daughter of Göran von Otter, a Swedish diplomat in Berlin during World War II. She is also the older sister of Casten von Otter, Mikael von Otter (1945–2018) and Anne Sofie von Otter.

== Career ==
Von Otter became a licensed physiotherapist in Stockholm in 1962. She was a journalist with Åhlén & Åkerlund from 1971 to 1976 and Aktuellt i Politiken from 1977 to 1979. She served as press secretary at SAP's press service from 1979 to 1982 and information secretary for her husband Kjell-Olof Feldt at the Ministry of Finance from 1982 to 1988 and political expert from 1989 to 1990. She moved to work as a writer and freelance writer in 1990.

Von Otter also had a leading role in the documentary "A Swedish Tiger" (first shown in 2018 in the United States and Germany) which is based on a meeting in 1942 between her father Göran von Otter and SS officer Kurt Gerstein, and problematizes missing or delayed reporting on the Holocaust during World War II.

== Personal life ==
From 1962 to 1970, von Otter was married to Gunnar Hörstadius and had three children, including Erik Hörstadius. In 1970, she married her second husband, politician Kjell-Olof Feldt (1931–2025).

== Bibliography ==
- 1989 – Personligt meddelande (novel)
- 1991 – Navelsträngar och narrspeglar
- 1991 – Alla dessa dagar (with Kjell-Olof Feldt)
- 1994 – Glömskans flod (novel)
- 1996 – Kom igen! – tillbaka till arbetslivet
- 1996 – Följa med till slutet – om att vaka vid en dödsbädd, Birgitta von Otter, Maud Pihlblad
- 2000 – Snöängel (novel)
- 2003 – I cancerns skugga – ett år av förtvivlan och hopp, Kjell-Olof Feldt & Birgitta von Otter
- 2010 – Kvarlevor (novel)
- 2013 – Barnläkarfallet: En förnekad rättsskandal (with Kjell-Olof Feldt)
- 2016 – Vägen ut. En loggbok om alkoholism och medberoende (with Kjell-Olof Feldt)
