= Embassy of Sweden, Helsinki =

- Location: Helsinki
- Address: Pohjoisesplanadi 7 PB 168; FIN-00131 Helsinki; Finland
- Coordinates: 60°10′5.2″N 24°57′15.5″E
- Opening: 1918
- Ambassador: Peter Ericson
- Jurisdiction: Finland
- Website: Official website

The Embassy of Sweden in Helsinki is Sweden's diplomatic mission in Finland. It is located at Pohjoisesplanadi in downtown Helsinki. The current ambassador of Sweden to Finland, since 2024, is Peter Ericson.

== History ==
In January 1918, the Swedish King in Council proposed creating a ministerial position in Helsinki. Foreign Minister Johannes Hellner commented that, given Finland's new status as an independent state, it was essential to establish a diplomatic mission in Helsinki as soon as possible, with a minister and a legation secretary. At the same time, the career consulate general in Helsinki was to be abolished.

In September 1954, the Swedish government decided to elevate the legation in Helsinki to an embassy, and at the same time the current envoy, Gösta Engzell, was appointed ambassador in Helsinki.

== Buildings ==
=== Chancery ===
The embassy building was built in 1839 to be businessman J. H. Heidenstrauchs home. It became a diplomatic mission in the 1920s. It was originally designed by architect A. F. Granstedt, but after becoming a diplomatic mission, it was heavily changed. The architect of this was Swedish Torben Grut, who designed it to look like the Stockholm Palace.

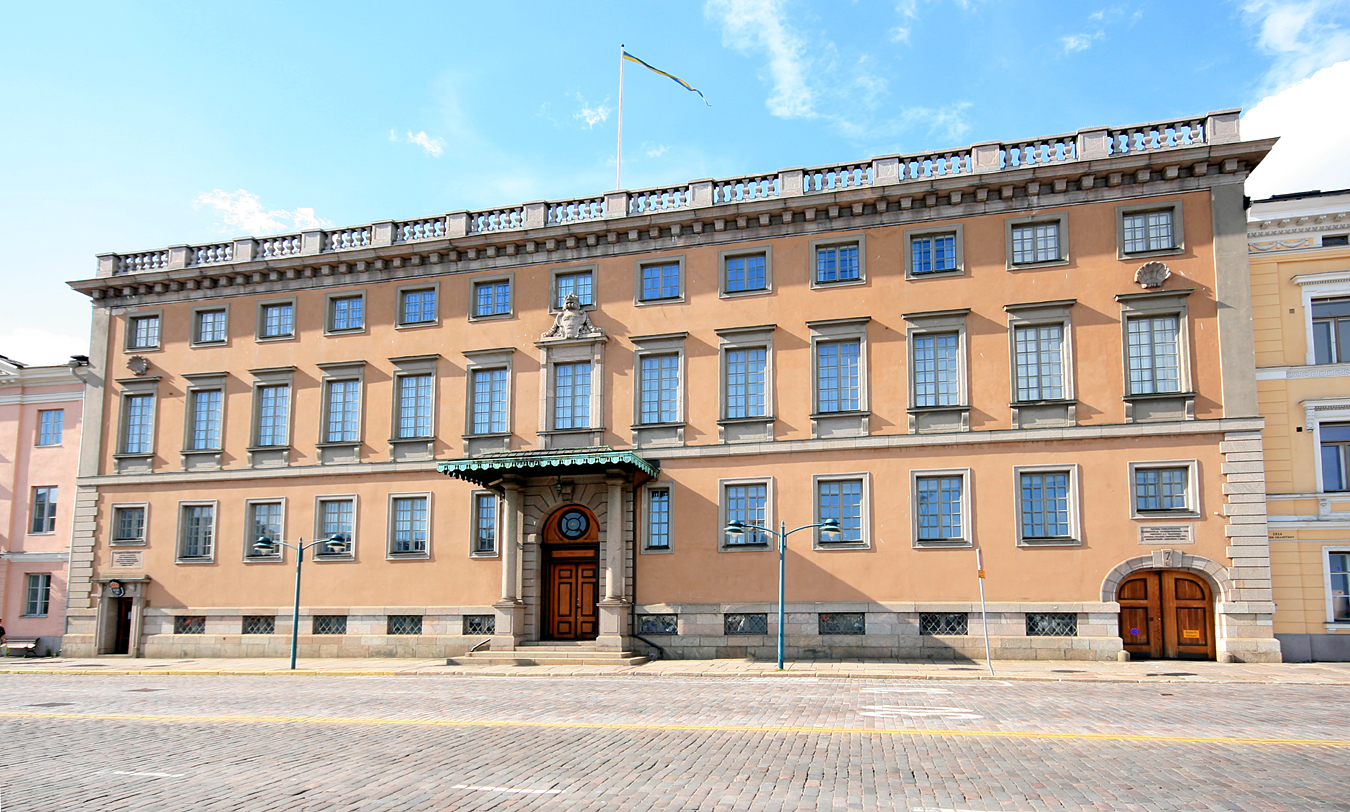
Exterior

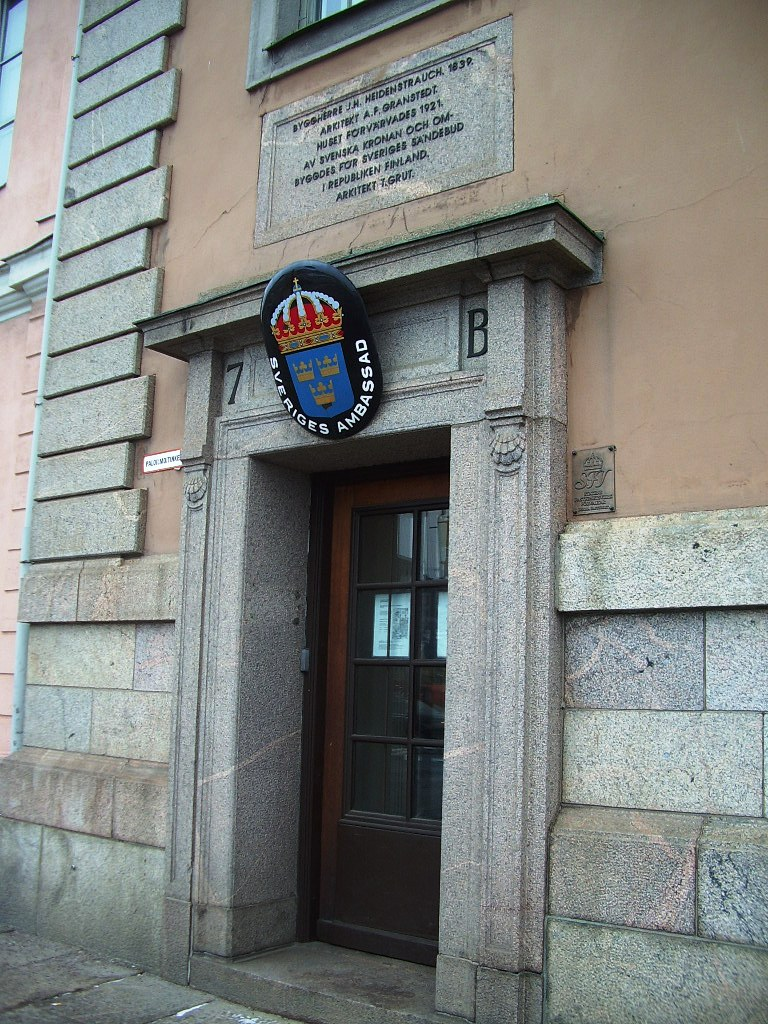
Entrance

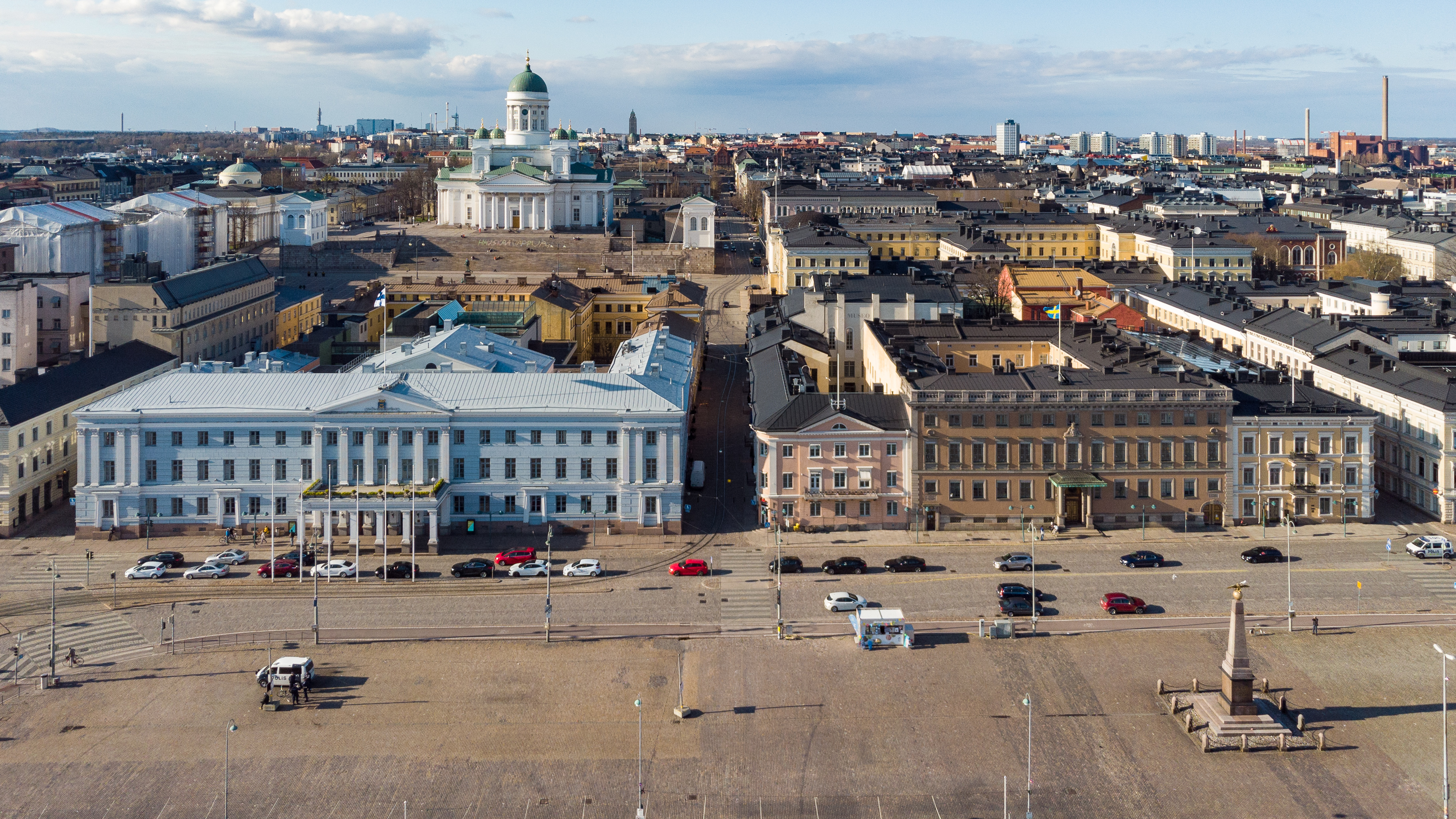
Aerial view

== See also ==
- List of ambassadors of Sweden to Finland
- Finland-Sweden relations
- 1906 Helsinki bank robbery
