= Göran von Otter =

Swedish diplomat (1907–1988)

Baron Göran von Otter
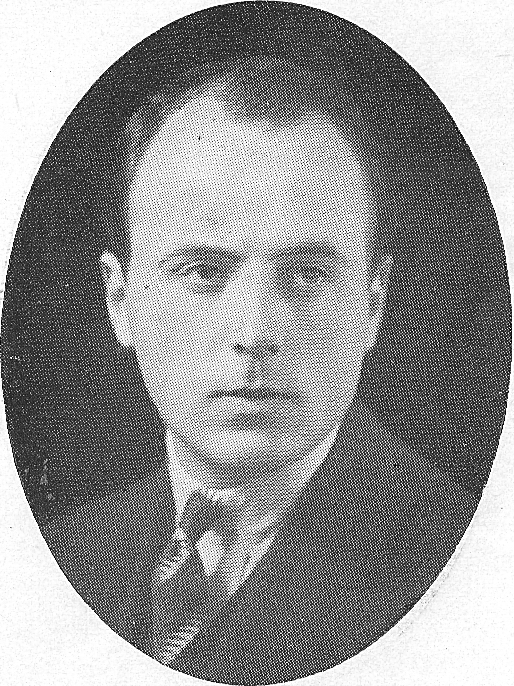
- Born: Göran Fredrik von Otter; 4 August 1907; Hässleholm Municipality, Sweden
- Died: 4 December 1988 (aged 81); Stockholm, Sweden
- Occupation: Diplomat
- Years active: 1932–1973
- Spouse: Anne Marie Ljungdahl (m. 1934)
- Children: 4, including Birgitta and Anne Sofie
- Relatives: Fredrik von Otter (grandfather); Kjell-Olof Feldt (son-in-law); Benny Fredriksson (son-in-law)

Baron Göran Fredrik von Otter (4 August 1907 – 4 December 1988) was a Swedish diplomat and friherre, best known for his service in Berlin during World War II. Birgitta and Anne Sofie von Otter are von Otter's daughters; former Swedish Prime Minister Fredrik von Otter was his grandfather.

== Early life ==
Von Otter was born on 4 August 1907 in Sörby Parish in Hässleholm Municipality, Kristianstad County, Sweden, the son of Lieutenant Colonel, Baron Fredrik von Otter and his wife Baroness Elsa (née Wrede). He attended the Royal Swedish Naval Academy from 1926 to 1928 and received a Candidate of Law in 1932.

== Career ==
Von Otter conducted court service from 1932 to 1935, and became an attaché at the Ministry for Foreign Affairs in 1935. Von Otter served in Vienna in 1937, in Budapest and Belgrade in 1938, and as second vice consul in London in 1939. He served as second legation secretary in Berlin in 1939, and as first legation secretary in 1942.

On the night between the 22 and 23 August 1942, Göran von Otter met Kurt Gerstein in a train from Warsaw to Berlin. Gerstein was an official at the "Institute of Hygiene" of the Waffen-SS and was on his way back from the Nazi concentration camp Treblinka. One day earlier, Gerstein had witnessed several hundred Jewish victims being murdered in the gas chambers at Bełżec extermination camp. Gerstein and von Otter happened to be in the same compartment of the train. After the war, von Otter wrote about the encounter that Gerstein gave him a detailed report of what had happened at Belzec, seemed very disturbed by it and implored him to transmit this information to the Swedish authorities. Von Otter did talk with high-ranking officials at the Swedish Foreign Ministry. However, the information was not passed on to the Allies or to any other party. After the end of the war, von Otter attempted to ascertain the whereabouts of Gerstein, but was not able to locate him before Gerstein's alleged suicide death on 25 July 1945 in the Cherche-Midi military prison. This, combined with his inability to persuade those in the Swedish Foreign Ministry of the initial incident, contributed greatly to the depression he struggled with late in his life.

Von Otter served at the Foreign Ministry in Stockholm in 1944, in Helsinki in 1945, and in Brussels in 1949. He then served as legation counsellor in the Swedish UN delegation from 1951 to 1953, and as director (byråchef) at the Foreign Ministry in Stockholm from 1955 to 1959 (acting in 1953), embassy counsellor in Bonn from 1959 to 1962, and became minister in 1959. Von Otter served as consul general in London from 1962 until his retirement in 1973.

== Personal life ==
In 1934, von Otter married Anne Marie Ljungdahl (1912–1997), the daughter of Major Claes Edward Ljungdahl and Alfsol (née Améen). They had four children: Birgitta (born 1939), Casten (born 1941), Mikael (born 1945), and Anne Sofie (born 1955).

== Honours ==
- Herald of the Most Noble Order of the Seraphim

== Awards and decorations ==
- (Sweden) Knight of the Order of the Polar Star (1957)
- (Netherlands) Commander of the Order of Orange-Nassau
- (Hungary) Commander of the Hungarian Order of Merit
- (Belgium) Officer of the Order of the Crown
- Knight 1st Class of the Order of the White Rose of Finland
- (Hungary) Officer of the Hungarian Order of Merit

== Popular culture ==
He is depicted in the movie The Swedish Connection (2026), played by Johan Glans. His role in assisting Jewish refugees via diplomacy during the rescue of the Danish Jews is explored in the film.

Diplomatic posts
Preceded by Carl Bergenstråhle	Consul General of Sweden in London; 1962–1973	Succeeded by None
