= The Swedish Connection =

- Promotional release poster
- Swedish: Den svenska länken
- Directed by: Thérèse Ahlbeck; Marcus Olsson
- Written by: Thérèse Ahlbeck; Marcus Olsson
- Produced by: Julia Gebauer
- Cinematography: Joachim Hedén
- Edited by: Michal Leszczylowski; Joakim Pietras
- Music by: Kaspar Kaae; Johan Testad
- Production company: Way Feature Films
- Distributed by: Netflix
- Release dates: 25 January 2026 (Göteborg); 6 February 2026 (Sweden)
- Running time: 103 minutes
- Country: Sweden
- Languages: Swedish; German

The Swedish Connection (Swedish: Den svenska länken) is a World War II drama film about Swedish foreign ministry bureaucrat Gösta Engzell, who develops and executes covert plans to rescue European Jewish refugees by using legal loopholes and paperwork. Released in 2026, the film stars Henrik Dorsin as Engzell and was directed by Thérèse Ahlbeck and Marcus Olsson.

== Plot ==
In 1942, the Swedish government is officially neutral, but capitulates to German demands and engages in press censorship to avoid angering Germany. Diplomat Gösta Engzell is a mid-level bureaucrat, working in a basement and fielding large quantities of asylum requests from Jews. Engzell gets a new secretary, Rut Vogl, to whom he expresses concern about the size of his departmental office and Swedish immigration refusing Jewish asylum cases; he is rebuffed by cabinet secretary, and his direct superior, Staffan Söderström on both counts. Engzell hears from the Swedish consul in Norway that a Swedish Jew has been taken into police custody in Oslo, but Engzell tells the consulate not to provide the requested note verbale, only to be ignored by the consul.

On a train in General Government, Swedish diplomat Göran von Otter learns about the Final Solution from Kurt Gerstein, who finds the genocide repulsive. Rut suggests their office should try to provide visas for as many Norwegian Jews as possible. Engzell initially refuses, but changes his mind after he overhears Söderström discussing von Otter's genocide report and when his son Stig picks The Little Match Girl for their bedtime reading. Engzell and his department begin sorting through the 7,000 requests at his direction and identify 150 cases where the claimant has a connection to Sweden. They start with weaker cases, in hopes of setting precedent, including the Bondy case: twin boys in Prague who have a Jewish mother and Swedish step-father. However, they are refused by the Germans.

Engzell is called into a meeting with the German consul, who is suspicious of the number of Jews claiming Swedish citizenship. Söderström threatens to send Engzell to Moscow, a hardship post, if he continues intervening. Engzell's department learns that hundreds of Norwegian Jews are being rounded up and sent to death camps. Engzell fails to convince Söderström to allow the press to report on it, but convinces a sympathetic censor Nils Erik Elkund, to allow some reporting. The resultant public outcry prompts Prime Minister Per Albin Hansson to demand Söderström tell him who is in charge of the Jewish situation; Söderström replies that Engzell is. Engzell's diplomatic maneuvering finds success, as some Norwegian Jews with a Swedish connection are released. Engzell wants Sweden to accept 100 more, and suggests they do so unofficially, to avoid angering Germany but still save the remaining Jews in Norway.

Under Engzell's direction, von Otter negotiates for the Bondy boys. Rut says they may be in Theresienstadt Ghetto. Engzell arranges for von Otter to visit, but he is turned away. von Otter approaches a resident and learns that the boys will be imminently transferred to a death camp. Engzell, von Otter, and another Swedish diplomat visit German officials on behalf of the Bondy twins. They succeed, but Söderström declares he will send Engzell's entire department to Moscow as punishment.

Engzell and Rut go to Copenhagen to meet the Bondy parents, but the twins do not arrive as expected. Returning to Sweden, Rut is stopped by Swedish officials due to the Jewish stamp in her passport, which she concealed from Engzell. Engzell arranges for her to take shelter in the Swedish embassy in Copenhagen. Engzell then works on dropping the visa requirement on Jews. He and Dag Hammarskjöld make a deal with an exiled Danish minister, Johan C.W. Kruse, to work around a law requiring the Swedish Jewish community to financially support incoming refugees. After Söderström tries to thwart the plan, Engzell sidesteps him by hosting a press conference announcing the revocation of the visa requirement for Jewish immigrants.

Sweden begins accepting Jewish refugees. As the tide of the war turns, Sweden receives international praise for saving the Jews of Denmark. Engzell implies that Söderström instructed him to host the press conference, leading the foreign minister to send Söderström to Moscow. Rut returns to Sweden, to Engzell's relief. Raoul Wallenberg, who is revealed as the film's narrator, visits Engzell's department to learn about their process. Wallenberg and others using the provisional visa process pioneered by Engzell's team are credited with rescuing 100,000 Jews during the war, including the Bondy twins, whose provisional visas are shown with new photographs.

== Cast ==
- Henrik Dorsin as Gösta Engzell, head of the legal department in the Swedish Foreign Ministry
- Sissela Benn as Rut Vogl, a Jewish-German woman who takes a position in Engzell's legal department; she will replace Stina when Stina retires.
- Jonas Karlsson as Staffan Söderström, the cabinet secretary. He is constantly at odds with Engzell, who reports to him directly.
- Jonas Malmsjö as Svante Hellstedt, one of Engzell's subordinates in the legal department
- Carl Jacobson as Magnus Hallonsten, one of Engzell's subordinates in the legal department
- Marianne Mörck as Stina Johansson, the most senior member of Engzell's legal department. She is implied to be Engzell's assistant.
- Johan Glans as Göran von Otter, first secretary at the Swedish legation in Berlin
- Oscar Töringe as Nils Erik Eklund, the director of Swedish press censorship
- Richard Ulfsäter as Eric von Post, councillor at the Swedish legation in Berlin
- Stefan Gödicke as Arvid Richert, Sweden's envoy to Germany
- Christoffer Nordenrot as Dag Hammarskjöld, State Secretary at the Finance Ministry. From 1953, the second secretary-general of the United Nations
- Per Lasson as Per Albin Hansson, the Prime Minister of Sweden
- Simon Norrthon as Robert Paulson, the director of the Swedish Immigration Office
- Figge Norling as Claes Westring, Sweden's consul general in German-occupied Norway
- Beatrice Järås as Hillevi Landegren, consul Westring's personal secretary
- Loa Falkman as Marcus Ehrenpreis, the chief rabbi of Stockholm
- Joshua Seelenbinder as SS-Obersturmbannführer Adolf Eichmann, the head of RSHA IV B4 and the key architect of the Final Solution
- Robert Beyer as Reichsführer-SS Heinrich Himmler, the head of the SS
- Eva Westerling as Mrs. Jönsson, Söderström's assistant; she is referred to as his "bulldog".
- Paul Schröder as Martin Luther, Undersecretary at the German Foreign Ministry
- Wilfried Hochholdinger as Victor zu Wied, the highest-ranking German consul in Sweden
- Simon Mantei as SS-Obersturmführer Kurt Gerstein, an SS-officer who warns von Otter about German extermination camps
- Olle Jansson as Christian Günther, Sweden's Minister for Foreign Affairs
- Per Gavatin as Raoul Wallenberg, a diplomat at the Swedish Foreign Ministry
- Heino Hansen as Johan C.W. Kruse, a Danish minister living in exile in Stockholm
- Isa Aouifia as Gilel Storch, a Jewish refugee from Latvia settled in Sweden
- Frantisek Oliver Cziky as Georg Ferdinand Duckwitz, a German diplomat who secretly warns the Swedish authorities about the imminent deportation of Danish Jews
- Stefan Galbác as Vilhelm Assarsson, Sweden's envoy to Moscow

== Release ==
The film had its world premiere at the Göteborg Film Festival on 25 January 2026, and was released in select cinemas in Sweden on 6 February. The film was also released in select cinemas across the United States and the United Kingdom the following week. The film began streaming on Netflix on 19 February.

== Critical response ==
In The Guardian, Cath Clarke gave it three out of five stars and writes "It's an uplifting message in a watchable movie." Valerie Kalfrin of the Alliance of Women Film Journalists calls the film "...a fair wartime adventure that could benefit from more suspense, even if it depicts how even tiny cogs can disrupt a much larger machine."
