= Water Atlas =

Composition by Sebastian Fagerlund

Water Atlas is an orchestral composition by Sebastian Fagerlund composed between 2017 and 2018. It was co-commissioned by the Royal Concertgebouw Orchestra, BBC Symphony Orchestra, and the Finnish Radio Symphony Orchestra. The world premiere took place on April 21, 2018 at the NTR Zaterdagmatinee in Concertgebouw, Amsterdam by the Netherlands Radio Philharmonic Orchestra conducted by Osmo Vänskä. The Finnish premiere took place in Helsinki on May 16, 2018 by the Finnish Radio Symphony Orchestra conducted by Hannu Lintu. The UK premiere took place at the Barbican Hall on January 24, 2020 performed by the BBC Symphony Orchestra conducted by Jukka-Pekka Saraste.

== Recordings ==
- Sebastian Fagerlund – Nomade & Water Atlas BIS-2455

== Instrumentation ==
The work is scored for a large orchestra comprising three flutes (3rd doubling picc.), three oboes (3rd doubling eng.hn.), two clarinets, bass clarinet, two bassoons, contrabassoon, four horns, three trumpets, three trombones, tuba, timpani, four percussionists, piano, harp and strings.

== Reception ==
The world premiere and following country premieres of Water Atlas were all well-received by music critics.

- "Sebastian Fagerlund was afgelopen seizoen composer in residence van het Concertgebouw, en schreef in deze hoedanigheid aan zijn bijna twintig minuten durende waterwerk voor het Radio Filharmonisch Orkest. In een stevige symfonische opzet daagt de Finse componist de musici uit tot een spel met intense klanklagen en bezielde instrumentale kleuring. Het orkest ging er gretig op in." - Frederike Berntsen, Trouw 23.4.2018
- "Novelties came in the shape of the UK premiere of Water Atlas – surging, lapping, cyclical music, conjuring up the Finnish landscape." - Fiona Maddocks, The Guardian 1.2.2020
- "Sebastian Fagerlundin uusi vesiaiheinen orkesteriteos tarjosi kunnon kuohuja, tyventä sekä ainutlaatuista kekseliäisyyttä." - Veijo Murtomäki, Helsingin Sanomat 17.5.2018
