= Peter Ericson =

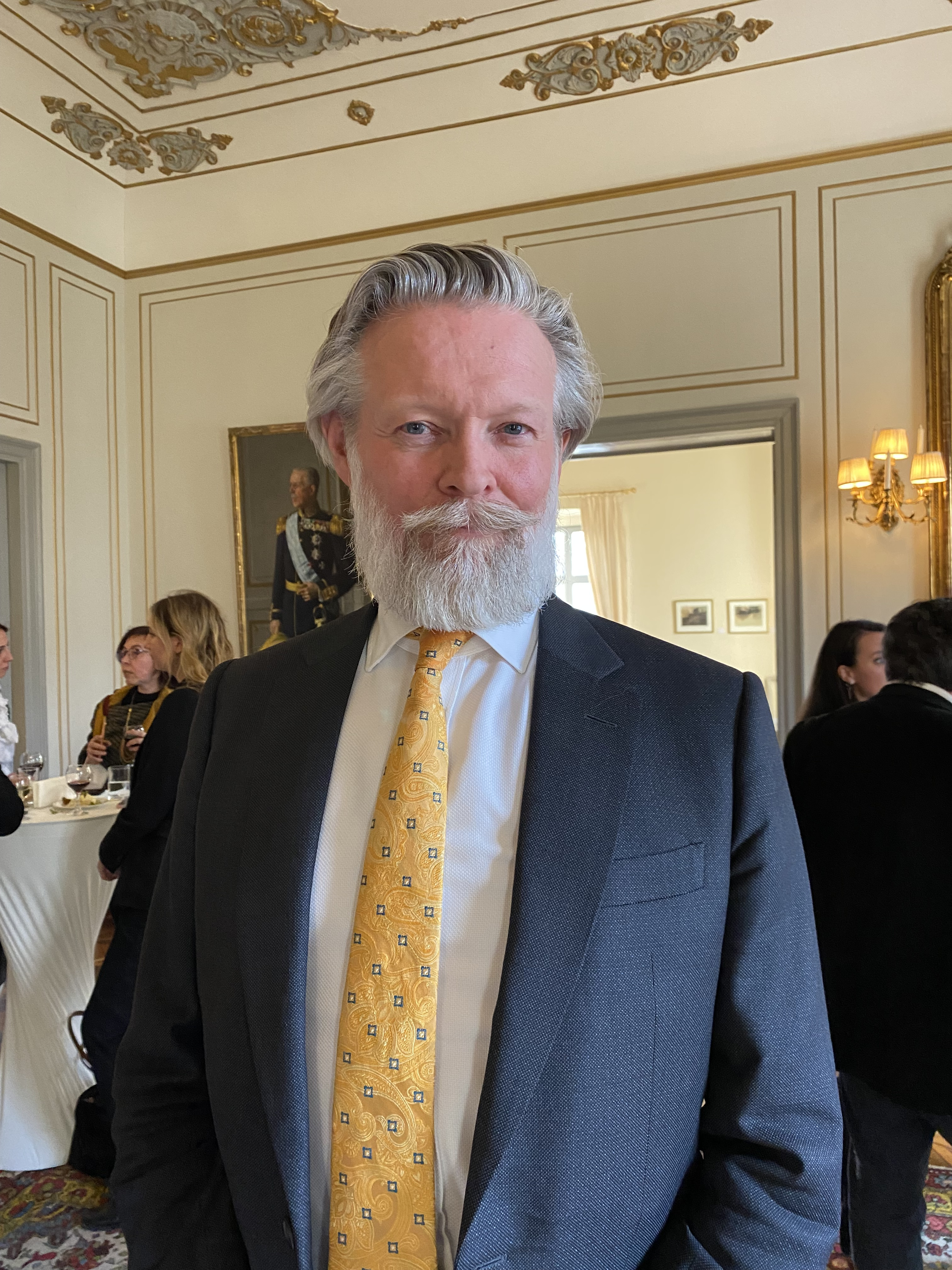
- Peter Ericson on 22 March 2022.
- Born: 11 September 1964 (age 61); Gothenburg, Sweden
- Education: Stockholm School of Economics
- Occupation: Diplomat
- Years active: 1989–present
- Spouse: Stina Stoor (m. 2018)

John Peter Ericson (born 11 September 1964) is a Swedish diplomat, and currently the Swedish ambassador to Finland.

== Career ==
Ericson did his military service at Tolkskolan. He graduated in 1989 as an economist from the Stockholm School of Economics. He joined the Swedish Ministry of Foreign Affairs in 1989, where he has served at the embassies in Washington DC, Brussels and Moscow as well as at the Swedish UN representation in New York. He has also worked as ministerial advisor and head of the Ministry of Foreign Affairs' security policy unit (SP) in Stockholm. From 28 September 2015 to 2019, he was the Swedish ambassador in Moscow. On 1 September 2019, he was appointed consul-general in Istanbul.

Ericson has lived in Moscow on three occasions, first from 1984 on, when he witnessed the coming to power of Mikhail Gorbachev, then in 1990–94, witnessing the collapse of the Soviet Union, and then in 2015–19, soon after Russia had annexed the Crimean Peninsula and started the war in Eastern Ukraine.

On 30 May 2024, the government appointed Peter Ericson as ambassador in Helsinki. Before that he was head of the unit for Eastern Europe and Central Asia at the Swedish Ministry of Foreign Affairs.

In an interview with Helsingin Sanomat in November 2024, Ericson said that “You can’t have a conversation with Putin’s Russia... how can you talk to someone when you know that the other side is not telling the truth. … What’s the point of talking to Lavrov when you know he’s lying. … Why would I waste my time talking to such a person?” He states that Russia cannot be influenced much. He also does not believe that there will be a negotiated solution to the Ukraine conflict. In his opinion, Russia is the biggest security problem for Finland and Sweden, and it will be so for a long time.

Diplomatic posts
Preceded by Veronika Bard Bringéus	Ambassador of Sweden to Russia; 2015–2019	Succeeded by Malena Mård
Preceded by Therese Hydén	Consul General of Sweden to Istanbul; 2019–2022	Succeeded by Johanna Strömquist
Preceded by Nicola Clase	Ambassador of Sweden to Finland; 2024–present	Succeeded by Incumbent
