= Eva Walder =

Swedish economist and diplomat

Her Excellency Eva Walder
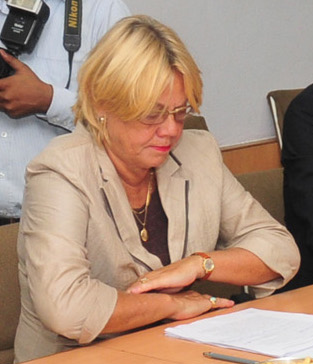
- Walder in 2012

Ambassador of Sweden to Finland
- In office 2006–2009
- Preceded by: Ulf Hjertonsson
- Succeeded by: Johan Molander

Ambassador of Sweden to Singapore
- In office 1998–2002
- Preceded by: Krister Isaksson
- Succeeded by: Teppo Tauriainen

Personal details
- Born: Eva Walder-Brundin; 5 June 1951 (age 75) Stockholm, Sweden
- Education: Stockholm School of Economics
- Occupation: Economist and diplomat

Eva Birgitta Walder (born 5 June 1951) or formerly Eva Walder-Brundin, is a Swedish retired economist and diplomat who became the ambassador to Singapore from 1998 to 2001, and Finland from 2006 to 2009. She has experience in economics, economic development, trade, and trade agreements, with extension to corporate social responsibility, gender concerns, and disarmament. She has also served on various boards with an economic/financial focus, alongside maintaining contacts with civil society and represents Sweden at numerous forums.

== Education ==
Walder graduated with an economics degree from the Stockholm School of Economics.

== Diplomatic career ==
Walder served as Ambassador to Finland from 2006 to 2009, and to Singapore from 1998 to 2002. She has also worked in Dhaka, Vienna, and New York for the Swedish Permanent Mission to the United Nations. She has served as Head of Human Resources, Head of the Asia Department, Head of the Department for Promotion of Sweden and Swedish Trade and the EU Internal Market, and Director-General for Trade in the Stockholm office. She has represented Sweden at the United Nations (first, second, and third Committees), numerous UN Conferences, and a number of EU meetings on Asia and commerce.

"The goal of the "Green Sweden" program is to spread environmentally conscious thinking. The Swedish Embassy announced the initiative in Hungary in 2010, with the participation of the Swedish Trade Council and Swedish corporations operating in Hungary," explained Walder on 25 April 2012. Swedish and Hungarian specialists highlighted potential for sustainable city development as part of the "Green Sweden" program.

On 9 February 2015, the Philippines and Sweden had their third bilateral consultations in Stockholm. The conference was co-chaired by Maria Zeneida Angara Collinson, Annika Söder, and Walder. Both parties saw the opportunity for further collaboration in trade and investment, renewable energy, urban transportation, and disaster risk reduction and management.

Eduardo Martinetti, met with Annika Söder and Walder in Stockholm. The bilateral agenda was reviewed during the meetings, which took place on 27 October 2015. Similarly, the Peruvian government official exchanged opinions on the present world situation as well as issues related to the two countries' multilateral relationship. Joint collaboration in research, technology, clean energy, disaster prevention and relief, education, and health was expected to deepen ties between the two countries.

Foreign Minister Margot Wallstrom stated that the nominations of Annika Ben David and Walder as human rights and disarmament ambassadors on 20 May 2016 were intended to boost "the profile of Swedish human rights and democracy, as well as Sweden's work on international disarmament." Walder would develop Sweden's disarmament policy.

On 13 October 2016, the Permanent Missions of Switzerland and Sweden conducted a side event on nuclear cruise missiles at the United Nations Headquarters. Frank Guetter, Ambassador and Head of Division for Security Policy at the Swiss Federal Department of Foreign Affairs, and Ambassador Walder moderated the panel. Guetter and Walder thanked the audience for their presence in their opening remarks and provided a quick outline of the ideas covered in their delegation's "De-alerting" paper presented to the Open Ended Working Group in May 2016, Geneva.

Many countries that voted in favour of the revised Nuclear Non-Proliferation Treaty were anticipated to sign it when it becomes available for signature on 20 September 2017, however other major supporters may not. "Despite the complexity of the matter, and the unprecedentedly limited time at our disposal, Sweden has voted in favor of the adoption of this treaty.... At the same time, we recognise that there are crucial elements of this treaty that do not meet what my delegation was aiming for," Walder said.

Diplomatic posts
Preceded by Krister Isaksson	Ambassador of Sweden to Singapore; 1998–2002	Succeeded by Teppo Tauriainen
Preceded by Krister Isaksson	Ambassador of Sweden to Brunei; 1998–2002	Succeeded by Teppo Tauriainen
Preceded by Ulf Hjertonsson	Ambassador of Sweden to Finland; 2006–2009	Succeeded by Johan Molander
