= Kjell-Olof Feldt =

Swedish politician (1931–2025)

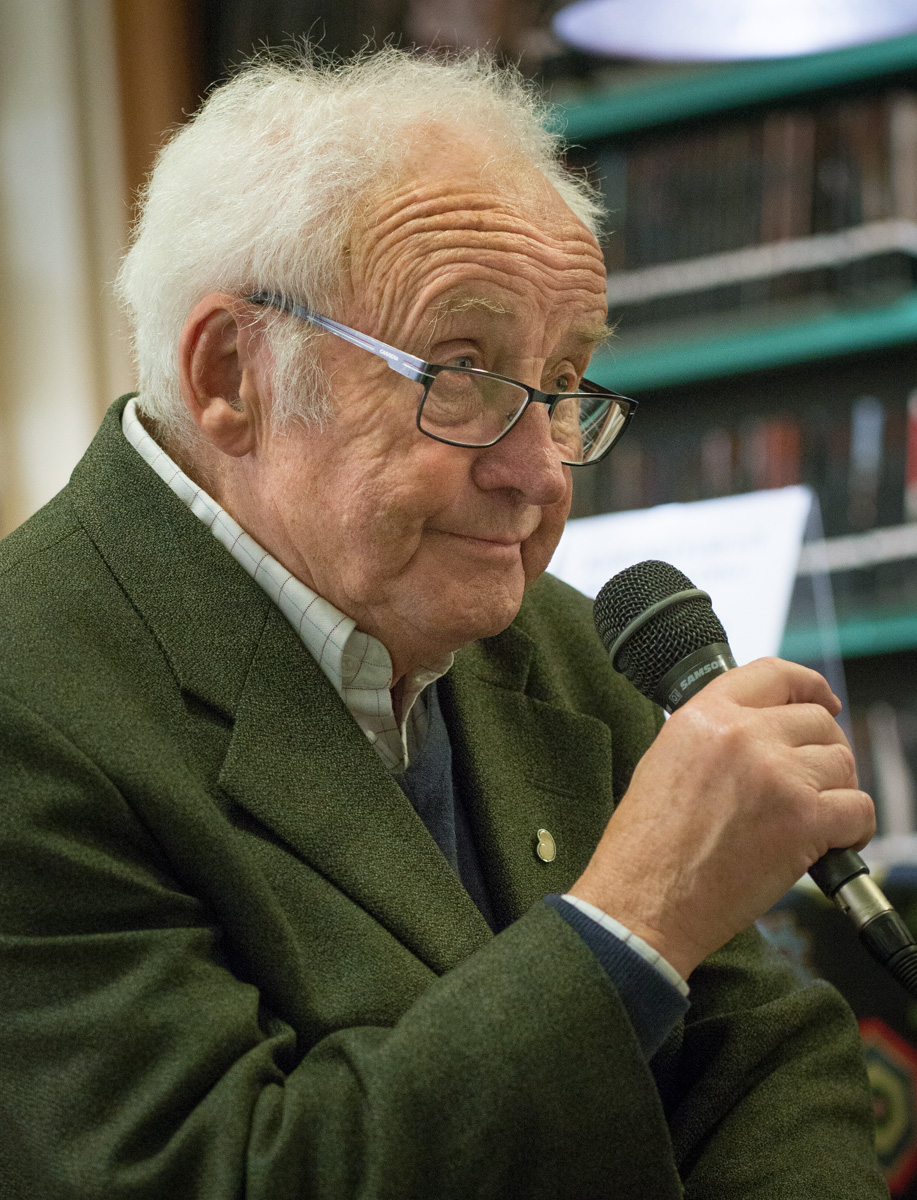
- Feldt at the Hedengrens bookstore in Stockholm in 2016

Minister for Finance
- In office 1 January 1983 – 15 February 1990
- Prime Minister: Olof Palme; Ingvar Carlsson
- Preceded by: Gösta Bohman
- Succeeded by: Odd Engström

Minister for the Budget
- In office 8 October 1982 – 31 December 1982
- Prime Minister: Olof Palme
- Preceded by: Rolf Wirtén
- Succeeded by: None

Minister of Commerce and Industry
- In office 9 October 1970 – 9 November 1975
- Prime Minister: Olof Palme
- Preceded by: Gunnar Lange
- Succeeded by: Carl Lidbom

Personal details
- Born: Kjell Olov Feldt; 18 August 1931 Holmsund, Sweden
- Died: 8 January 2025 (aged 93) Nacka, Sweden
- Party: Social Democratic
- Spouse(s): Elisabet Lundberg (m. 1957, divorced) Birgitta von Otter (m. 1970)
- Children: 3
- Education: Uppsala University; Lund University
- Occupation: Politician

Kjell-Olof Feldt (Note: Originally spelled Fält, registered as Kjell Olov Feldt.) (18 August 1931 – 8 January 2025) was a Swedish Social Democratic politician who was minister of finance between 1983 and 1990. Previously, Feldt was assistant minister of finance from 1975 to 1976 and minister of commerce and industry from 1970 to 1975, as well as minister for the budget in 1982. The Social Democrats lost power in the 1976 elections, but, after having won the elections of 1982, Feldt was appointed minister of finance by prime minister Olof Palme. He was seen as a part of Kanslihushögern during his time in office.

== Early life ==
Feldt was born on 18 August 1931 in Holmsund, Västerbotten County, Sweden, the son of Alexander Fält and his wife Irma (née Jonsson). Feldt was the son of a single mother, Irma, who had to send young Kjell-Olof to live with his grandfather's sister because of his father's alcoholic problems.

He passed studentexamen in Skellefteå in 1950, and received a Master of Politics degree from Uppsala University in 1956, and a Licentiate of Philosophy degree from Lund University in 1967.

== Career ==
=== Political career ===
Feldt served as an amanuensis at the Ministry of Finance in 1957. He was secretary of the 1957 Pensions Committee (1957 års pensionskommitté) from 1957 to 1959, the Indexation Committee (värdesäkringskommitté) from 1959 to 1964, and the Government Loan Guarantee Board (garantilånenämnden) from 1960 to 1964. He later worked as a budget secretary at the Ministry of Finance from 1962 to 1964, became director (byråchef) there from 1964 to 1965, and served as head of the budget department in 1965. From 1967 to 1970 he was state secretary at the ministry. He then served as minister of commerce and industry and head of the Ministry of Commerce and Industry from 1970 to 1975, as a minister without portfolio in the Ministry of Finance from 1975 to 1976, and finally as minister for finance and head of the Ministry of Finance from 1982 to 1990.

In a Playboy Scandinavia interview, Feldt reminisced upon his own legacy within the Social Democratic Party, "The negative inheritance I received from my predecessor Gunnar Sträng (minister of finance 1955–1976) was a strongly progressive tax system with high marginal taxes. This was supposed to bring about a just and equal society. But I eventually came to the opinion that it simply didn't work out that way he concluded. Progressive taxes created instead a society of wranglers, cheaters, peculiar manipulations, false ambitions and new injustices. It took me at least a decade to get a part of the party to see this."

In the late 1980s, Feldt was heavily criticised from within his own party: he and others at the Ministry of Finance "kanslihushögern" were perceived to be promoting right-wing politics and to be failing to live up to the traditional ideals of the social democrats. When economic problems mounted in 1990, the rift was highlighted, and Feldt left office after a fall-out with Prime Minister Ingvar Carlsson on 16 February. Feldt had been in favour of a more conservative economic policy in response to the crisis, and when his ideas met resistance, he decided to leave his office. Feldt subsequently left party politics, though he remained a member of the Social Democratic Party. During the 1990s and early 2000s, Feldt has heavily criticised Social Democratic economic policy, both past and present.

=== Other work ===
He was also editor of the Tiden magazine from 1962 to 1964. In addition, he served as a member of the First Board of the AP Fund (AP-fondens 1:a styrelse) from 1965 to 1967, the National Swedish Collective Bargaining Office from 1967 to 1970, and the Swedish Administration Development Agency from 1965 to 1967. He was chairman of the Board of Governors of the Sveriges Riksbank (Riksbanksfullmäktige) from 1967 to 1970 and a member of parliament for the Swedish Social Democratic Party from 1971 to 1990.

=== Later career ===
After his parliamentary career, he held a number of board and chairmanship positions. He was chairman of SJ AB from 1990 to 1992 and of Vin & Sprit AB from 1991 to 1993, and a board member of Nordbanken from 1991 to 1994. He also served as chairman of Hälsoinvest from 1990 to 1995 and of Skånebrännerier AB from 1996 to 1998. From 1992 onward he was involved with the Swedish Road Association and the Hjärnfonden Foundation. He was chairman of the Noaks Ark – Red Cross Foundation (Stiftelsen Noaks Ark - Röda Korset) from 1993 to 1999 and a member of the Board of Governors of the Sveriges Riksbank from 1994 to 1998. In addition, he served on the boards of Sandrew AB from 1997, the Spirits and Wine Suppliers' Association (Sprit- och Vinleverantörsföreningen) from 1998, Pensionsforum from 1998, and Sandrew-Metronome AB from 1998.

== Personal life and death ==
In 1957, Feldt married the school dental nurse Elisabet Lundberg (1935–2016), the daughter of director Magnus Lundberg and Ruth Nylin. They had three children: Helena (born 1958), Anders (born 1961), and Erik (born 1964). In 1970, he married Birgitta von Otter (born 1939), the daughter of the diplomat Göran von Otter and Anne Marie Ljungdahl.

Feldt died on 8 January 2025, at the age of 93.

== Honours ==
- Member of the Royal Swedish Academy of Engineering Sciences (1990)
- Honorary Doctor of Philosophy, Uppsala University (31 May 1991)
- Honorary Doctor of Medicine, Karolinska Institute (2000)
