= Nomade (Concerto for Cello and Orchestra) =

Composition by Sebastian Fagerlund

Nomade – Concerto for Cello and Orchestra is a composition for solo cello and symphony orchestra by Finnish composer Sebastian Fagerlund. The world premiere of the concerto was at the Elbphilharmonie concert hall on 15 February 2019 in Hamburg, Germany by NDR Elbphilharmonie Orchestra and cellist Nicolas Altstaedt, conducted by Hannu Lintu. The Finnish premiere took place with the Finnish Radio Symphony Orchestra conducted by Lintu and with soloist Altstaedt on 11 April 2019.

== Composition ==
Nomade – Concerto for Cello and Orchestra was composed in 2018. It was commissioned by NDR Elbphilharmonie Orchestra and the Finnish Radio Symphony Orchestra. The concerto has a duration of ca. 38 minutes and is dedicated to cellist Nicolas Altstaedt.

== Instrumentation ==
The work is scored for solo cello and an orchestra consisting of two flutes (second doubling alto flute), two oboes, two clarinets in B♭, bass clarinet, two bassoons, contra bassoon, two horns, two trumpets, trombone, tuba, timpani, three percussionists, piano, harp, and strings.

== Recordings ==
- Sebastian Fagerlund – Nomade & Water Atlas BIS-2455

== Reception ==
The concerto and the recording of the concerto has been praised by critics.

- "Nomade is, as far as I am concerned, a great piece of music that deserves to rank amongst the finest cello concertos of our times" – Hubert Culot, MusicWebInternational
- "Sebastian Fagerlundin uusi sellokonsertto on upea ja yllätyksellinen (The Cello Concerto by Sebastian Fagerlund is magnificent and full of surprises)" – Hannu-Ilari Lampila, Helsingin Sanomat
- "Finnish composer Sebastian Fagerlund's music is a beguiling mix of the fiercely energetic and glitteringly intricate." – Kate Wakeling, BBC Music Magazine
- "Makalöst kraftfull musik i stor skala (Incomparably powerful music on a large scale) – Martin Nyström, Dagens Nyheter
- "Finnish composer's cello concerto is convincing in the hands of its dedicatee" – Peter Quantrill, The Strad Magazine
