= Kanslihushögern =

Swedish political concept

Kanslihushögern ("The chancellery right") is a political concept in Sweden that originated during the 1980s, referring to members of the right wing of the Swedish Social Democratic Party.

== Origins and ideology ==
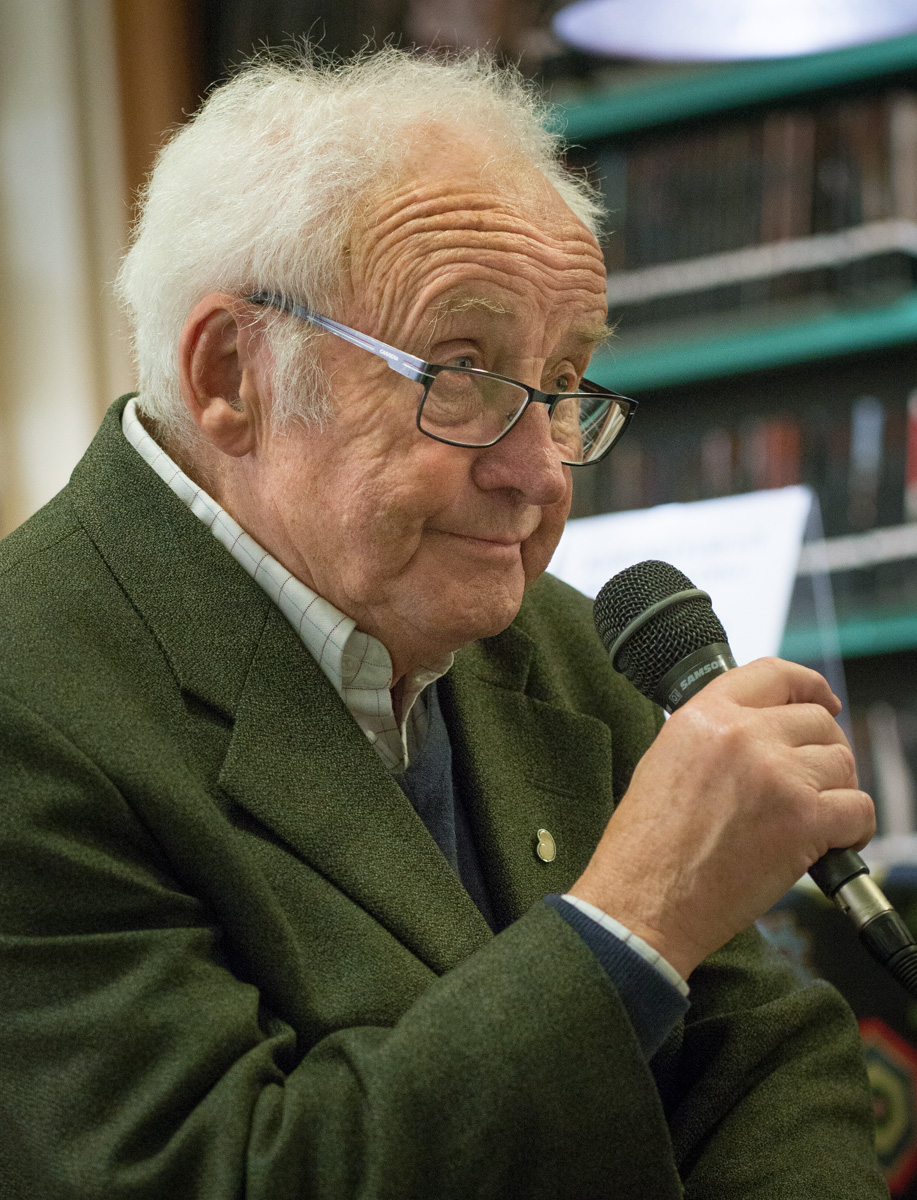
Kjell-Olof Feldt, who served as Minister for Finance between 1983 and 1990, was considered a representative of the "chancellery right".

Following the 1976 general election in Sweden a right-wing coalition government led by Thorbjörn Fälldin of the Centre Party was formed, making him the first non-Social Democratic Prime Minister since 1936. The Social Democratic loss of power was in part attributed to the party being associated with centralization and bureaucracy, giving rise to new ideological directions within the party.

After the Social Democrats regained power in the 1982 general election, the Ministry of Finance came under strong influence by a group of economists with a background in the Swedish Trade Union Confederation as well as the Stockholm School of Economics. Known as kanslihushögern or Feldts pojkar ("Feldt's boys", after then-Minister for Finance Kjell-Olof Feldt), the group still advocated the Nordic model, but with increased emphasis on markets and decentralization.

People considered to have been part of the "chancellery right" include Kjell-Olof Feldt and Erik Åsbrink, both Ministers of Finance in 1983–1990 and 1996–1999 respectively, and the economists Klas Eklund and Lars Heikensten. Feldt would also be seen as the leader of the right wing of the Social Democrats in the so-called Wars of the Roses, a further ideological conflict within the party during the late 1980s and early 1990s, while Stig Malm, then Chairman of the Swedish Trade Union Confederation, was viewed as the leader of the party's left wing.

== See also ==
- Neoliberalism
- New public management
- Third Way
