= List of ambassadors of Sweden to Finland =

Ambassador of Sweden to Finland
- Lesser coat of arms of the Kingdom of Sweden

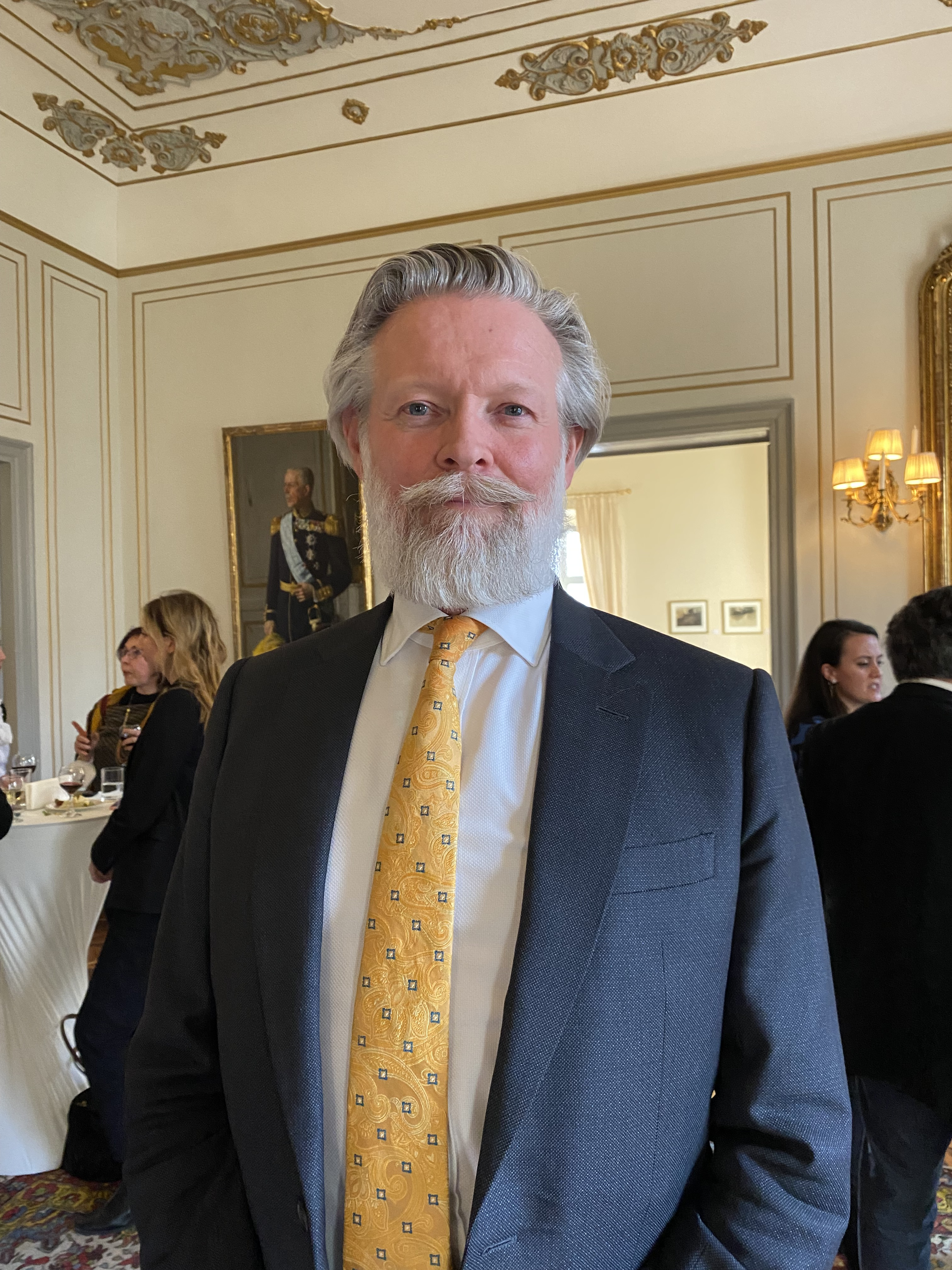
- Incumbent; Peter Ericson since 2024
- Ministry for Foreign Affairs; Swedish Embassy, Helsinki
- Style: His or Her Excellency (formal); Mr. or Madam Ambassador (informal)
- Reports to: Minister for Foreign Affairs
- Residence: Pohjoisesplanadi 7 B (Note: The ambassador's residence is at the same location as the chancery.)
- Seat: Helsinki, Finland
- Appointer: Government of Sweden
- Term length: No fixed term
- Inaugural holder: Walter Ahlström
- Formation: January 1918
- Website: Swedish Embassy, Helsinki

The Ambassador of Sweden to Finland (known formally as the Ambassador of the Kingdom of Sweden to the Republic of Finland) is the official representative of the government of Sweden to the president of Finland and government of Finland.

== History ==
Finland declared itself an independent state on 6 December 1917. On 4 January 1918, the King, with the unanimous support of the government ministers, decided in council to recognize Finland as an independent and sovereign state. A few days later, the consul general in Helsinki, Walter Ahlström, was appointed to temporarily represent Sweden in Finland in the capacity of chargé d'affaires. Ahlström immediately assumed his duties as chargé d'affaires, while at the same time continuing to hold his position as consul general.

Sweden's first minister in Finland was Gustaf Westman, who was appointed by the King in Council on 17 March 1918 as a minister en mission spéciale to the Finnish government in Vaasa. In April of the same year, Westman presented his credentials to the Chairman of the Senate of Finland Pehr Evind Svinhufvud.

In September 1954, an agreement was reached between the Swedish and Finish governments on the mutual elevation of the respective countries' legations to embassies. The diplomatic rank was thereafter changed to ambassador instead of envoy extraordinary and minister plenipotentiary.

== List of representatives ==
Name	Period	Title	Notes	Presented credentials	Ref
Walter Ahlström	January 1918 – 1918	Chargé d'affaires			
Gustaf Westman	17 March 1918 – 1918	Minister en mission spéciale	To the Vaasa Senate.	10 April 1918	
Gustaf Westman	1918–1921	Envoy			
Carl Leijonhufvud	1919–1919	Chargé d'affaires ad interim	During different times of the year 1919.		
Claes Vilhelm Benjamin Grill Tersmeden	31 March 1920 – 28 April 1920	Chargé d'affaires ad interim			
Claes Vilhelm Benjamin Grill Tersmeden	17 June 1920 – 22 November 1920	Chargé d'affaires ad interim			
Johan Hultman	1920–1921	Chargé d'affaires			
Gustaf Henning Elmquist	16 December 1921 – 26 September 1925	Envoy		9 January 1922	
Carl Hamilton	26 September 1925 – 1931	Envoy			
Herbert Ribbing	1930–1930	Chargé d'affaires ad interim			
Carl von Heidenstam	27 August 1931 – 11 March 1939	Envoy	Died in office.		
Stig Sahlin	March 1939 – March 1941	Envoy			
Karl Ivan Westman	1941–1942	Envoy			
Hans Beck-Friis	1942–1947	Envoy			
Otto Johansson	1947–1951	Envoy			
Gösta Engzell	1951–1954	Envoy			
Gösta Engzell	1954–1963	Ambassador			
Ingemar Hägglöf	1964–1971	Ambassador			
Göran Ryding	1971–1975	Ambassador			
Sten Sundfeldt	1975–1980	Ambassador		29 August 1975	
Kaj Sundberg	1980–1984	Ambassador			
Knut Thyberg	1984–1992	Ambassador			
Mats Bergquist	1992–1997	Ambassador			
Kerstin Asp Johnsson	1997–2001	Ambassador			
Ulf Hjertonsson	2001–2005	Ambassador			
Eva Walder Brundin	March 2006 – March 2009	Ambassador			
Johan Molander	2009 – 20 December 2011	Ambassador			
Örjan Berner	2 January 2012 – 2012	Acting chief			
Anders Lidén	2012–2016	Ambassador			
Anders Ahnlid	November 2016 – 2020	Ambassador		1 December 2016	
Nicola Clase	October 2020 – 2024	Ambassador		22 October 2020	
Peter Ericson	2024–present	Ambassador		3 September 2024	

== See also ==
- Finland–Sweden relations
- Embassy of Sweden, Helsinki
- List of ambassadors of Finland to Sweden
