= Stig Malm =

Swedish trade unionist (1942–2021)

- Born: Stig Nils Åke Malm; 4 March 1942; Sundbyberg, Sweden
- Died: 5 March 2021 (aged 79); Danderyd, Sweden
- Occupations: Trade unionist, politician
- Political party: Swedish Social Democratic Party

Stig Nils Åke Malm (4 March 1942 – 5 March 2021) was a Swedish trade unionist (Swedish Metalworkers' Union) and politician. He was chairman of the Swedish Trade Union Confederation (Swedish: Landsorganisationen i Sverige, LO) in 1983–1993.

== Biography ==
Stig Malm grew up in a workers' home in Sundbyberg, and started employment at the Swedish packaging firm Arenco at the age of sixteen. He later trained as an instrument maker at a vocational school in 1958, and soon got involved in union activities; first at Arenco's workers' club and then from 1965 as an assistant at the trade union school of the Swedish Metalworkers' Union in Åkersberga. In 1967 Malm became an ombudsman for the Swedish Metalworkers' Union, and in 1979 second vice chairman. In 1981, he was elected second vice chairman of LO, and in 1983 its chairman.

Malm resigned from his position as chairman of LO in 1993, after it was revealed that he had approved a number of generous severance packages to managers of the trade union owned construction company BPA. In 1994, he published an autobiography, 13 år ("13 Years").

Malm was a member of the Swedish Social Democratic Party. During the late 1980s and early 1990s, Malm was a representative of the party's left wing, in opposition to the Third Way policies promoted by the party's right wing (see Kanslihushögern). After his resignation as chairman of LO, Malm was active as a local politician in Solna Municipality, north of Stockholm. In 2004, Malm participated as a contestant in the popular TV game show På spåret together with comedian Babben Larsson.

In 2021, Malm died from complications caused by COVID-19 at Danderyd Hospital during the COVID-19 pandemic in Sweden, one day after his 79th birthday. Prime Minister Stefan Löfven, who earlier was chairman of IF Metall, the successor organization of the Swedish Metalworkers' Union, remembered him as an "ideologically clear representative of the Swedish labour movement" and "an outspoken LO chairman who always defended the members' interests".

Preceded by Gunnar Nilsson	President of the Swedish Trade Union Confederation; 1983—1993	Succeeded by Bertil Jonsson
