= For the Stars =

2001 album by Anne Sofie von Otter and Elvis Costello

Studio album by Anne Sofie von Otter meets Elvis Costello
- Released: April 10, 2001
- Recorded: September 23, 2000 – January 21, 2001
- Studio: Atlantis, Stockholm, Sweden
- Genre: Baroque pop
- Label: Deutsche Grammophon
- Producer: Elvis Costello

Anne Sofie von Otter chronology
| Home for Christmas (1999) | For the Stars (2001) | I Let the Music Speak (2006) |

Elvis Costello chronology
| The Sweetest Punch (1999) | For the Stars (2001) | When I Was Cruel (2002) |

Professional ratings
Review scores
| Source | Rating |
|---|---|
| AllMusic | 3/5 stars |

For the Stars is a collaboration album by classically trained Swedish mezzo-soprano Anne Sofie von Otter and Elvis Costello, released in 2001.

== Track listing ==
For the Stars track listing
| No. | Title | Writer(s) | Length |
|---|---|---|---|
| 1. | "No Wonder" | Elvis Costello | 3:33 |
| 2. | "Baby Plays Around" | Cait O'Riordan; Declan MacManus | 3:11 |
| 3. | "Go Leave" | Kate McGarrigle | 2:49 |
| 4. | "Rope" | Fleshquartet; Costello | 3:54 |
| 5. | "Don't Talk (Put Your Head on My Shoulder)" | Brian Wilson; Tony Asher | 3:11 |
| 6. | "Broken Bicycles/Junk" | Tom Waits/Paul McCartney | 4:04 |
| 7. | "The Other Woman" | Jessie Mae Robinson | 3:34 |
| 8. | "Like an Angel Passing Through My Room" | Benny Andersson; Björn Ulvaeus | 4:56 |
| 9. | "Green Song" | Costello; Svante Henryson | 4:36 |
| 10. | "April After All" | Ron Sexsmith | 2:49 |
| 11. | "You Still Believe in Me" | Wilson; Asher | 3:07 |
| 12. | "I Want to Vanish" | Costello | 2:40 |
| 13. | "For No One" | Lennon–McCartney | 1:57 |
| 14. | "Shamed into Love" | MacManus; Rubén Blades | 3:44 |
| 15. | "Just a Curio" | Fleshquartet; Costello | 4:16 |
| 16. | "This House Is Empty Now" | Burt Bacharach; Costello | 4:36 |
| 17. | "Take It with Me" | Waits; Kathleen Brennan | 3:16 |
| 18. | "For the Stars" | Costello | 2:44 |

== Personnel ==
- Elvis Costello – vocals, baritone guitar, Lowrey organ, bass
- Anne Sofie von Otter – vocals
- Bengt Forsberg – piano, Hammond B-3 organ
- Billy Bremner
- Michael Blair – vibraphone, bass drum, percussion
- Bebe Risenfors – clarinet, tenor saxophone, accordion
- Svante Henryson – celtar, cello, upright bass
- Mats Schubert – piano, harmonium, Moog bass
- Steve Nieve – piano, celeste, organ

== Charts ==
Chart performance for For the Stars
| Chart (2001) | Peak position |
|---|---|
| Australian Albums (ARIA) | 81 |
| Dutch Albums (Album Top 100) | 80 |
| German Albums (Offizielle Top 100) | 59 |
| Norwegian Albums (VG-lista) | 33 |
| Swedish Albums (Sverigetopplistan) | 25 |
| UK Albums (OCC) | 67 |
