= Christoffer Sundqvist =

Finnish clarinettist (born 1978)

- Born: 1978 (age 47–48); Jakobstad, Finland
- Origin: Finland
- Instrument: clarinet

Christoffer Sundqvist (born 1978) is a Finnish clarinettist. Since 2005 he has been first clarinet of the Finnish Radio Symphony Orchestra.

In 2013 he was the soloist in the first performance of the clarinet concerto Peregrinus ecstaticus by Erkki-Sven Tüür, with the Finnish Radio Symphony Orchestra under Hannu Lintu.

== Life ==
Sundqvist was born in Jakobstad in 1978. He first studied at the Pietarsaaren Musiikkitalo, the conservatory of Jakobstad, under Bernhard Nylund, and then at the Sibelius Academy in Helsinki under Anna-Maija Korsimaa, and after that under François Benda at the Music Academy of Basel.

== Work ==
He has been first clarinet of the Finnish Radio Symphony Orchestra since 2005.

In 2013 he was the soloist in the first performance of the clarinet concerto Peregrinus ecstaticus by Erkki-Sven Tüür, with the Finnish Radio Symphony Orchestra under Hannu Lintu. He has also been the soloist in first performances of clarinet concertos by Markus Fagerudd and by Sebastian Fagerlund, and was the soloist in the clarinet concerto of Kimmo Hakkolas in Norrköping in Sweden in 2013–2014. He and Fagerlund are the artistic directors of the annual RUSK festival of chamber music in Jakobstad, which took place for the seventh time in 2019.

== Reception ==
Sundqvist has received various prizes and awards, among them:

- Pro Musica medal, 1998
- Joint first prize in the Crusell Clarinet Competition, 2002
- Emma Award for recording of music by Jukka Tiensuu, Alba ABCD 287, 2011
- 2011 Emma Award for recording of music by Sebastian Fagerlund, BIS SACD-1707, 2011.

A review in Helsingin Sanomat in 2011 of his CD/SACD recording Levitation spoke of the fluidity of his playing, his extreme tonal range, his rhythmic elasticity and his sure sense of style, whether as an orchestral soloist, as a chamber musician or as a soloperformer. A review of a BBC Symphony Orchestra concert at the Barbican Hall in London in 2013 speaks of his "super-virtuosity ... every twist and turn played with remarkable assurance and precision".

== Recordings ==
- 2000 ‒ Sebastian Fagerlund: Emanations, for Solo Clarinet, Two Percussionists and String Orchestra. Turku Conservatory Orchestra, cond. Sauli Huhtala, KACD2001-2.
- 2010 ‒ Atso Almila: Wind Quintet II Arctic Hysteria; Pehr Henrik Nordgren: Laupias samarialainen for Wind Quintet op. 141, Wind Quintet No. 2 op. 22; Joonas Kokkonen: Quintet for Flute, Oboe, Clarinet, Horn and Bassoon. Arctic Hysteria Wind Quintet (Matti Närhinsalo, flute, Anni Haapaniemi, oboe, Christoffer Sundqvist, clarinet, Tommi Hyytinen, horn and Ann-Louise Wägar, bassoon), Alba ABCD 307.
- 2010 ‒ Jukka Tiensuu: Tango lunaire, Plus IV, Beat, Rubato, Asteletsa and Tombeau de Beethoven. Plus Ensemble (Erkki Lahesmaa, cello, Mikko Luoma, accordion and Christoffer Sundqvist, clarinet), Alba ABCD 287.
- 2011 ‒ Levitation. Peter Eötvös: Levitation; Carl Nielsen: Clarinet Concerto; Aulis Sallinen: Concerto for Clarinet, Viola and Chamber Orchestra op. 9. Finnish Radio Symphony Orchestra, cond. Hannu Lintu and Okko Kamu, Christoffer Sundqvist (clarinet), Kullervo Kojo (clarinet), Tommi Aalto (viola), Alba ABCD 314.
- 2011 – Sebastian Fagerlund: Concerto for Clarinet and Orchestra. Gothenburg Symphony Orchestra, cond. Dima Slobodeniouk, BIS-SACD-1707.
- 2013 ‒ Nordgren: Concerto for Clarinet, Folk Instruments and Small Orchestra op. 14. Finnish Radio Symphony Orchestra, cond. Juha Kangas, Alba ABCD 359.
