= I Let the Music Speak (album) =

I Let The Music Speak

Studio album by Anne Sofie von Otter
- Released: 2006
- Genre: Acoustic pop Classic pop
- Length: 47:39
- Language: English; Swedish
- Label: Deutsche Grammophon

Anne Sofie von Otter chronology
For the Stars (Anne Sofie von Otter meets Elvis Costello) (2001)	I Let The Music Speak (2006)	Noël (Anne Sofie von Otter & Bengt Forsberg) (2006)

I Let The Music Speak is a compilation album by Swedish singer Anne Sofie von Otter.

== Track listing ==
1. The Day Before You Came - 05:10

- Benny Andersson - writing
- Björn Ulvaeus - writing
- Anne Sofie von Otter - vocals
- Georg Wadenius - guitars
- Fleshquartet - arrangements, strings & percussion

2. I Let The Music Speak - 05:00

- Benny Andersson - writing
- Björn Ulvaeus - writing
- Anne Sofie von Otter - vocals
- Georg Wadenius - guitar, arrangements
- Anders Eljas - arrangements
- Fredrik Jonsson - acoustic bass
- Magnus Persson - drums & percussion
- Jörgen Stenberg - vibraphone
- Mikael Augustsson - accordion
- David Björkman - violin
- Roland Kress - violin
- Jakob Ruthberg - viola
- Anna Wallgren - cello
- Magnus Lindgren - flute

3. When All Is Said and Done - 03:32

- Benny Andersson - writing
- Björn Ulvaeus - writing
- Anne Sofie von Otter - vocals
- Georg Wadenius - guitar & arrangements
- Fredrik Jonsson - acoustic bass
- Magnus Persson - drums
- Jörgen Stenberg - vibraphone
- Lasse Englund - Dobro guitar
- Kalle Moraeus - violin

4. I Walk With You, Mama - 03:31

- Benny Andersson - writing, piano & arrangements
- Björn Ulvaeus - writing
- Anne Sofie von Otter - vocals
- Svante Henryson - arrangements & acoustic bass

5. The Winner Takes It All - 04:00

- Benny Andersson - writing
- Björn Ulvaeus - writing
- Anne Sofie von Otter - vocals
- Anders Eljas - arrangements
- Georg Wadenius - arrangements, guitars & electric piano
- Fredrik Jonsson - acoustic bass
- Magnus Persson - drums
- Jörgen Stenberg - vibraphone
- David Björkman - violin
- Roland Kress - violin
- Jakob Ruthberg - viola
- Anna Wallgren - cello

6. Butterfly Wings - 03:42

- Benny Andersson - writing
- Björn Ulvaeus - writing
- Anne Sofie von Otter - vocals
- Anders Eljas - arrangements, piano
- Georg Wadenius - guitars
- Fredrik Jonsson - acoustic bass
- Magnus Persson - percussion
- Anna Wallgren - cello

7. Heaven Help My Heart (from the musical Chess) - 03:17

- Benny Andersson - writing
- Björn Ulvaeus - writing
- Tim Rice - writing
- Anne Sofie von Otter - vocals
- Anders Eljas - arrangements, piano
- Georg Wadenius - arrangements, guitar
- Fredrik Jonsson - acoustic bass
- Magnus Persson - percussion
- Jörgen Stenberg - vibraphone
- David Björkman - violin
- Roland Kress - violin
- Jakob Ruthberg - viola
- Anna Wallgren - cello
- Magnus Lindgren - bass clarinet

8. Ljusa kvällar om våren (from the musical Kristina från Duvemåla) - 04:37

- Benny Andersson - writing
- Björn Ulvaeus - writing
- Anne Sofie von Otter - vocals
- Anders Eljas - arrangements, piano
- Georg Wadenius - arrangements, guitar & scat vocals
- Fredrik Jonsson - acoustic bass
- Magnus Persson - drums
- Jörgen Stenberg - percussion

9. I Am Just A Girl - 03:14

- Benny Andersson - writing
- Björn Ulvaeus - writing
- Stig Anderson - writing
- Anne Sofie von Otter - vocals
- Georg Wadenius - arrangements & guitar
- Anders Eljas - piano
- Fredrik Jonsson - acoustic bass
- Magnus Persson - drums & percussion
- Lasse Englund - Dobro guitar
- Kalle Moraeus - banjo
- Karl Jakobsson - tuba
- Pär Grebacken - clarinet

10. Ut mot ett hav (from the musical Kristina från Duvemåla) - 05:15

- Benny Andersson - writing
- Björn Ulvaeus - writing
- Anne Sofie von Otter - vocals
- Georg Wadenius - arrangements, guitars, keyboards & drum programming
- Fredrik Jonsson - electric bass
- Magnus Persson - drums & percussion
- Jörgen Stenberg - vibraphone & marimba
- Magnus Lindgren - soprano saxophone

11. After The Rain (Efter regnet) - 02:54

- Benny Andersson - writing, arrangements & piano
- Mats Nörklit - writing
- Anne Sofie von Otter - vocals

12. Money, Money, Money - 03:31

- Benny Andersson - writing
- Björn Ulvaeus - writing
- Anne Sofie von Otter - vocals
- Mikael Augustsson - accordion
- David Björkman - violin
- Anders Eljas - arrangements, piano
- Pär Grebacken - clarinet
- Fredrik Jonsson - acoustic bass
- Roland Kress - violin
- Magnus Persson - drums & percussion
- Jakob Ruthberg - viola
- Jörgen Stenberg - vibraphone
- Anna Wallgren - cello

== Crew ==
- Recording: Stockholm, Atlantis Studio, 9/2004
- Executive Producer: Dr. Marion Thiem
- Project Manager: Valérie Gross
- Recording Producer: Georg Wadenius
- Balance Engineer: Janne Hansson
- Production Coordinator: Margaretha Söderling
- Publisher: Universal/Union Songs AB (1,2,3,5,9); Mono Music AB (4,6,8,11); Mono Music AB/Kopparnäset Forlags AB (10); Three Knights Ltd. (7)
- Booklet Editor: Eva Zöllner
- Colour photos (front & back cover & inside booklet): Thomas Klementsson
- Black & white photos (session photos): Mats Bäcker
- Design: Klasse 3b
- Art Direction: Merle Kersten

== Charts ==
Chart (2006)	Peak position
Swedish Albums (Sverigetopplistan)	13
Dutch Albums (Album Top 100)	63
