= Döbeln (opera) =

Opera by Sebastian Fagerlund

Döbeln is a chamber opera in two acts by Finnish composer Sebastian Fagerlund with a libretto by Jusa Peltoniemi. The world premiere took place on 25 July 2009 at the Kokkola Opera Summer Festival in Kokkola, Finland.

The main character of the opera is General Georg Carl von Döbeln. The opera starts when Döbeln suffers a head wound in the Battle of Porrassalmi during the Russo-Swedish War (1788–1790) and is operated on and treated with opium. The plot of the opera then shows seven dreams or hallucinations that Döbeln experiences under the influence of the opiates. At the end of the opera the events return to the operating table.

The opera is 60 minutes long and was commissioned by the Kokkola Opera Festival.

The opera was directed by Ville Sandqvist and the Kokkola Opera Festival Orchestra was conducted by Sakari Oramo.

== Roles ==
Roles, voice types, premiere cast
Role	Voice type	Premiere cast, 25 July 2009 Conductor: Sakari Oramo
Doktor 1 / Döbeln- Drömskepnad	soprano	Anu Komsi
Doktor 2 / Sprengtporten / Madame	soprano	Annika Mylläri
Betjänt / Kung Gustav IV Adolf / Fänrik	tenor	Lasse Penttinen
Döbeln / Laken	baritone	Sören Lillkung
Fältskärn	bass	Robert McLoud

== Reception ==
”Sebastian Fagerlund's full-bodied and colorful composing style impressively illustrates Döbeln's anesthesia and visions” (Sebastian Fagerlundin täyteläinen ja värikylläinen sävellystyyli kuvittaa vaikuttavasti Döbelnin narkoosia ja visioita) Samuli Tiikkaja, Helsingin Sanomat

”Virtuosic Opera about Döbeln mixes humor and seriousness” (Virtuos opera om Döbeln blandar humor och allvar) Lars Hedblad, Svenska Dagbladet

"Time, once again, to hail yet another obscenely talented young musician from Finland.” Gavin Dixon, MusicWeb International

"Convence la mera escucha de la ópera ... con una música fresca, ecléctica ... al servicio de una acción concisa y bien dibujada.” Scherzo

"Döbeln has me searching for recordings of other works by this composer, and looking forward to the next opera. May it come soon.” Ronald E. Grames, Fanfare Magazine

Disc of the Year 2010 Finnish Broadcasting Company
