= Autumn Sonata =

1978 film by Ingmar Bergman

- Swedish theatrical poster
- Directed by: Ingmar Bergman
- Written by: Ingmar Bergman
- Starring: Ingrid Bergman; Liv Ullmann; Lena Nyman; Halvar Björk
- Cinematography: Sven Nykvist
- Edited by: Sylvia Ingmarsdotter
- Music by: Frédéric Chopin
- Production company: ITC Entertainment
- Distributed by: Constantin Film
- Release date: 8 October 1978 (Sweden)
- Running time: 99 minutes
- Country: West Germany
- Language: Swedish
- Box office: $2 million

Autumn Sonata (Swedish: Höstsonaten) is a 1978 psychological drama film written and directed by Ingmar Bergman, and starring Ingrid Bergman (in her final film role), Liv Ullmann and Lena Nyman. Its plot follows a celebrated classical pianist and her neglected daughter who meet for the first time in years, and chronicles their painful discussions of how they have hurt each other. It was the first and only collaboration between Ingrid Bergman and Ingmar Bergman (who were not related).Autumn Sonata was the last of Ingmar Bergman's films to be made for theatrical exhibition; all of his films made after it, even those screened in theatres, were television productions.

== Plot ==
Eva, the wife of Viktor, the village pastor, invites her mother Charlotte for a visit to her rural home after seven years of separation. Charlotte is a pianist, aging and eccentric, who has survived several husbands and lovers and lived a cosmopolitan life. Eva, though less artistically gifted than her mother — despite having written two books and playing the piano competently — takes pride in her quieter existence as a wife, mother and caregiver. She looks after her disabled sister, Helena, whom she brought home from the hospital.

Helena is paralyzed and can only communicate in fragmented speech, which Eva alone can understand. Eva is also affected by the emotional distance in her marriage to Viktor, a man she respects but does not love, and by the grief of having lost their young son Erik, who drowned just before his fourth birthday.

Charlotte is surprised to find Helena living with Eva and reacts with visible discomfort, though she gives Helena her wristwatch as a gift. When Eva plays Chopin's Prelude No. 2 in A minor on the piano, Charlotte promptly reinterprets the piece herself, offering a technically and emotionally more refined version.

That evening, she reviews her finances after her inheritance from her late lover Leonardo and muses out loud to herself about giving her Mercedes car to Eva and Viktor and flying to Paris to purchase a new one for herself — an apparent gesture of generosity. Late in the night, Charlotte is shaken by a nightmare in which one of her daughters appears to be choking her. Her scream awakens Eva, who follows her into the living room, and they begin to talk.

Mother and daughter engage in an intense confrontation about their past relationship. Eva accuses Charlotte of having prioritized her career and personal life over motherhood, neglecting her daughters emotionally, and even of pressuring Eva into an abortion during a pregnancy with a man she was actually in love with. Viktor, listening from another room, chooses not to intervene.

Charlotte initially responds with disbelief and self-defense, but eventually begins to confront her own failings, acknowledging her emotional detachment and pleading for forgiveness. Meanwhile, Helena — whose condition Eva believes worsened due to Charlotte's past neglect — painfully crawls out of bed and toward the stairs, calling out weakly, “Mama, come!”

In the morning, Charlotte departs on a train accompanied by her agent and reflects on her unsettling encounter with Helena, asking, "Why couldn't she die?" At home, Viktor desperately tries to ease Helena during an emotional breakdown, while Eva visits the grave of their son, grappling with suicidal thoughts. Eva eventually returns home and writes a letter of apology to her mother, which Viktor reads aloud after she shows it to him. The scene briefly shifts to a different setting, where Eva appears to read the letter to Charlotte, before returning to Viktor, who seals it, leaving its fate uncertain.

== Cast ==
- Ingrid Bergman as Charlotte Andergast
- Liv Ullmann as Eva
- Lena Nyman as Helena
- Halvar Björk as Viktor
- Marianne Aminoff as Charlotte's private secretary
- Arne Bang-Hansen as Uncle Otto
- Gunnar Björnstrand as Paul
- Erland Josephson as Josef
- Georg Løkkeberg as Leonardo
- Mimi Pollak as Piano instructor
- Linn Ullmann as Eva as a child

== Production ==
=== Background ===
Due to his battle with the Swedish tax authorities at the time, (Note: Autumn Sonata is the second of Bergman's three films produced during his exile from Sweden, after 1977's The Serpent's Egg and before 1980's From the Life of the Marionettes.) Ingmar Bergman produced Autumn Sonata through his West German company, Personafilm GmbH, with main financing from Lew Grade's British ITC Film, and shot the film in an old film studio outside Oslo in Norway. Although formally a German production (with the German title, Herbstsonate, being the official original title), the dialogue is in Swedish, most of the crew and actors were Swedish, and the world premiere was in Stockholm.

Peter Cowie, in the notes to the Criterion DVD edition of the film, summarizes the production, stating: "Shot in Norway, with British and American backing, and featuring Swedish dialogue, Autumn Sonata emerged from one of the darkest spells in Ingmar Bergman's life. In 1976 he had gone into voluntary exile in Munich after being accused of evading tax on the income from certain films... Autumn Sonata... marks the swan song of Ingrid Bergman’s career, fulfilled her long-held desire to make a film with her namesake."

=== Music ===
The piano piece in the film is Frédéric Chopin's Prelude No. 2 in A minor played by Käbi Laretei, whose hands are shown whenever Ingrid Bergman is depicted playing the piano.

== Reception ==
=== Critical reception ===
In the Chicago Reader, Dave Kehr opined that Autumn Sonata "makes good chamber music: it's a crafted miniature with Bergman's usual bombast built, for once, into the plot requirements." Conversely, Gary Arnold of The Washington Post felt that its story was "a dubious variation on familiar neurotic themes" in Bergman's work, but also wrote that "one can be impressed by Bergman's instrumentalists while rejecting his composition. ... Autumn Sonata enjoys instant status as an acting showcase." Film critic Roger Ebert ranked the film at No. 5 in his list of 10 Best Films of 1978.

Retrospective evaluation is favorable. In 2002, Keith Phipps of The A.V. Club wrote, "When it was released in 1978, Ingmar Bergman's Autumn Sonata received positive to indifferent reviews, written off by many as a minor work from a great director. ... With the burden of high expectations lifted, Autumn Sonata can finally be seen as an austerely beautiful meditation on death and the not-always-realized possibility of reconciliation across generations." The film has an 85% rating on Rotten Tomatoes from 33 reviews with the consensus: "A melancholy meditation on the unresolvable tension between parent and child, Autumn Sonata is a fitting swan song for the great Ingrid Bergman."

=== Accolades ===
Award	Date of ceremony	Category	Recipient(s)	Result	Ref.
Academy Awards	9 April 1979	Best Actress	Ingrid Bergman	Nominated	
Academy Awards	9 April 1979	Best Writing (Screenplay Written Directly for the Screen)	Ingmar Bergman	Nominated	
Bodil Awards	1979	Best Non-American Film		Won	
César Awards	1979	Best Foreign Film		Nominated	
David di Donatello Awards	1979	Best Foreign Actress	Ingrid Bergman & Liv Ullmann	Won	
Golden Globe Awards	1978	Best Actress in a Motion Picture – Drama	Ingrid Bergman	Nominated	
Golden Globe Awards	1978	Best Foreign Language Film		Won	
Los Angeles Film Critics Association	16 December 1978	Best Actress	Ingrid Bergman	Nominated	
Los Angeles Film Critics Association	16 December 1978	Best Foreign Language Film	Autumn Sonata	Nominated	
Nastro d'Argento Awards	1979	Best Foreign Director	Ingmar Bergman	Won	
National Board of Review	19 December 1978	Best Director	Ingmar Bergman	Won	
National Board of Review	19 December 1978	Best Actress	Ingrid Bergman	Won	
National Board of Review	19 December 1978	Best Foreign Language Film		Won	
National Board of Review	19 December 1978	Top Foreign Language Film		Won	
National Society of Film Critics	4 January 1979	Best Actress	Ingrid Bergman	Won	
New York Film Critics Circle	28 January 1979	Best Director	Ingmar Bergman	3rd Place	
New York Film Critics Circle	28 January 1979	Best Actress	Ingrid Bergman	Won	
New York Film Critics Circle	28 January 1979	Best Foreign Language Film		2nd Place	

== Remakes and stage adaptations ==
- Tehzeeb (2003) is a Hindi film inspired by Autumn Sonata.
- A stage adaptation was performed at the Royal Dramatic Theatre in Stockholm in 2009 with Marie Göranzon and Maria Bonnevie.
- In April 2011, a new theatrical adaptation of Autumn Sonata, based on Bergman's original screenplay, had its World Premiere at the Yale Repertory Theatre in New Haven, CT, directed by Robert Woodruff.
- In 2017, a Swedish-language opera, Höstsonaten, was premièred at the Finnish National Opera. The music is composed by Sebastian Fagerlund and the libretto by Gunilla Hemming is based upon Bergman's screenplay.

== See also ==
- High Heels, a 1991 Spanish film directed by Pedro Almodovar, and partially inspired by Autumn Sonata
