= Gösta Engzell =

Swedish diplomat (1897–1997)

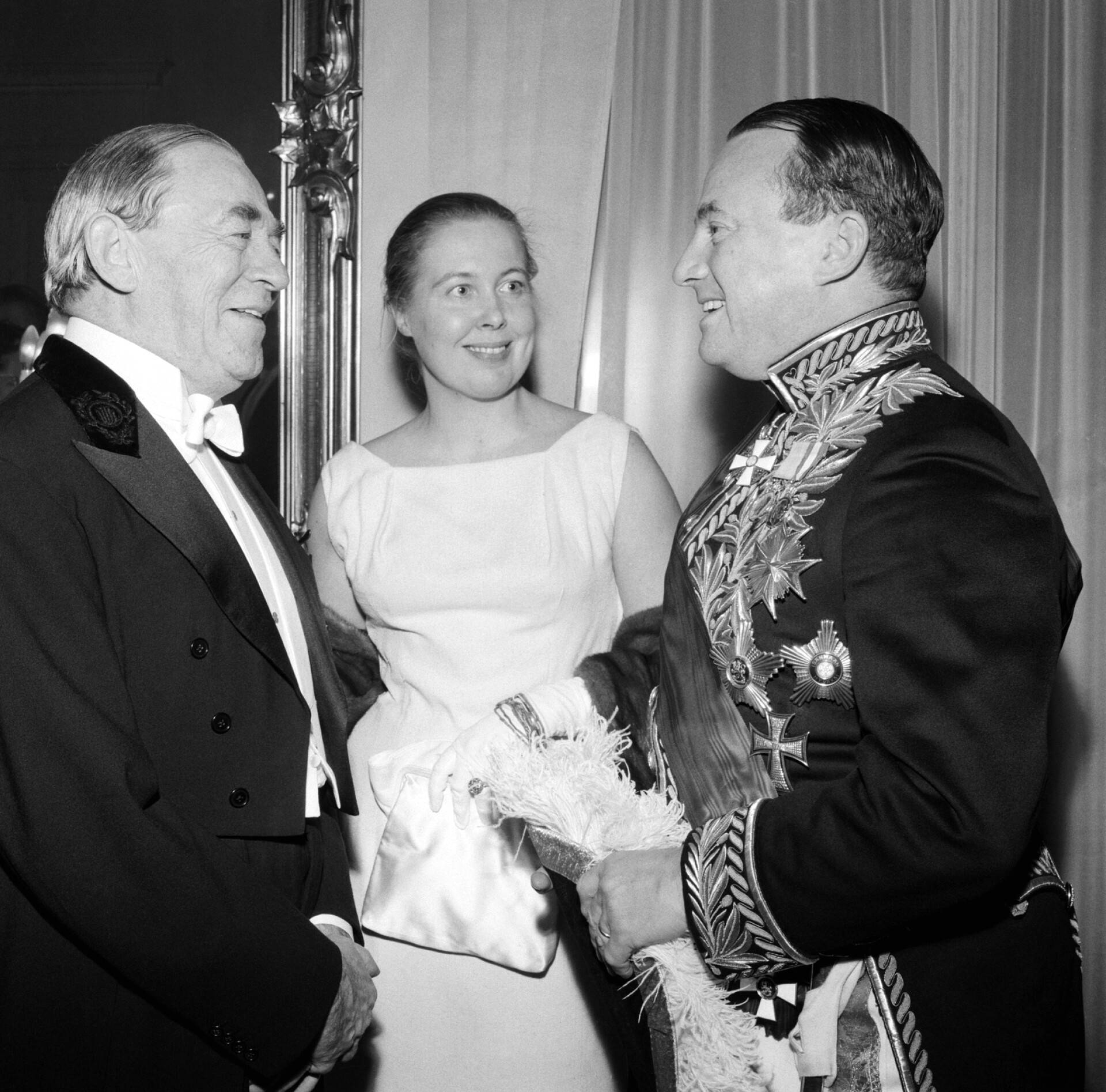
- Engzell (right) with Finnish architects Alvar Aalto and Elissa Aalto at the Finnish Independence Day reception in the Presidential palace in Helsinki on 6 December 1959

Envoy/Ambassador of Sweden to Finland
- In office 1954–1963
- Preceded by: Otto Johansson
- Succeeded by: Ingemar Hägglöf

Envoy of Sweden to Poland
- In office 1949–1951
- Preceded by: Claes Westring
- Succeeded by: Eric von Post

Personal details
- Born: 14 February 1897 Halmstad, Sweden
- Died: 7 March 1997 (aged 100) Djursholm, Sweden
- Spouse: Anna Ehrenkrona (m. 1927)
- Children: 4
- Education: Stockholm University College

Gösta Engzell (14 February 1897 – 7 March 1997) was a Swedish jurist and diplomat who is known for his activities to rescue Jews during World War II. He was the ambassador of Sweden to Finland between 1954 and 1963 and served in other diplomatic posts.

== Early life ==
Engzell was born on 14 February 1897 in Halmstad, Sweden, the son of Carl Nilson, a postmaster, and his wife Amy Engzell. He passed studentexamen in Skövde in 1915 and received a Candidate of Law degree from Stockholm University College in 1919.

== Career ==
Engzell began his career with district court service in the Vartofta and Frökind Judicial District from 1920 to 1922. He was appointed assessor at the Göta Court of Appeal in 1926, served as an extra legal clerk (fiskal) in 1929, and became a hovrättsråd in 1933. From 1931 he acted as judge referee, a position he formally assumed in 1936. He also held senior administrative posts, serving as acting Director-General for Administrative Affairs (expeditionschef) in the Ministry of Commerce and Industry in 1932 and in the Ministry of Finance in 1936. In 1938, he was appointed director-general (utrikesråd) and Head of the Legal Department of the Ministry for Foreign Affairs.

The department was in charge of all visa and immigration issues. Shortly after his appointment Engzell represented Sweden in the Évian Conference held at Évian-les-Bains, France, between 6 and 15 July 1938 to address the problem of German and Austrian Jewish refugees.

Engzell was made an envoy in 1947. He was the envoy of Sweden in Poland from 1949 to 1951. He held the same post in Finland between 1951 and 1954. Then he was named as the ambassador of Sweden from 1954 until 1963.

=== Rescuing Jews during World War II ===
In the late 1930s Engzell and the Swedish government did not have a special interest in Jews who had to flee Nazi Germany and did not make any attempt to facilitate the entry of Jews to Sweden without a Swedish visa or to help them acquire such a visa. His department at the Ministry was instructed to avoid allowing Jews entry.

On 7 September 1942, a Latvian refugee named Gillel Storch met Gösta Engzell and informed him about the increasingly negative conditions of Jews in the German-occupied territories. According to Paul A. Levine, Engzell began to influence the policy of the Swedish government which would help Jews in Nazi-controlled regions. He initiated actions to save Jews in Norway and Denmark. In addition, Engzell encouraged Swedish diplomats Raoul Wallenberg, Ivan Danielsson and Per Anger to take steps to protect Jews in Budapest in 1944. As a result of the activities of Engzell and his staff, approximately 30,000–40,000 Jews were rescued.

In a 2023 study, historian Olof Bortz argues that Swedish officials’ knowledge of the Holocaust did not itself change refugee policy in 1941–1942; he links the policy shift to persecution reaching Sweden’s Nordic neighbours and the changing course of the war.

== Personal life ==
In 1927, Engzell married Baroness Anna Ehrenkrona (born 1903), the daughter of Lieutenant Colonel Baron Carl-Erik Ehrenkrona and Signe Westman. They had four sons: Göran (born 1928), Ulf (born 1931), Stig (born 1938), and Hans (born 1945).

== Death ==
Engzell died in 1997.

== Legacy ==
The 2026 film, The Swedish Connection, is based on the work of Gösta Engzell to rescue Jews during World War II.

== Awards and decorations ==
- (Sweden) Commander Grand Cross of the Order of the Polar Star (6 June 1956)
- Grand Cross of the Order of the Lion of Finland
- (Belgium) Grand Officer of the Order of the Crown (February 1947)
- (Denmark) Commander 1st Class of the Order of the Dannebrog
- Commander 1st Class of the Order of the White Rose of Finland
- (Nazi Germany) Order of the German Eagle with Star

Diplomatic posts
Preceded by Claes Westring	Envoy of Sweden to Poland; 1949–1951	Succeeded by Eric von Post
Preceded by Otto Johansson	Envoy/Ambassador of Sweden to Finland; 1951–1963	Succeeded by Ingemar Hägglöf
