= Ingela Brimberg =

Swedish dramatic soprano opera singer

- Born: 1964 (age 61–62); Sweden
- Genres: Classical
- Occupation: Singer
- Website: https://www.ingelabrimberg.com

Ingela Brimberg (born 5 May 1964) is a Swedish dramatic soprano opera singer.

== Career ==
Brimberg was born in Stockholm. She studied at the Academy of Music and Drama at the University of Göteborg. She then studied psychology at the University of Stockholm and in 1996 co-authored a paper on psychotherapy for alcohol dependent patients before being awarded a master's degree. Brimberg began her career as a mezzo-soprano, but has shifted to singing soprano roles. She was revealed to international audiences in 2011 in Bruxelles where she sang Valentine in the famous production of "Les Huguenots" directed by Olivier Py and conducted by Marc Minkowski; she won the Svenska Dagbladets Opera Award for this role in 2012.

Brimberg has an extensive repertoire of roles, from Mozart to Wagner, and including Beethoven, Puccini, Strauss, and Britten. She has performed with leading orchestras, including the Swedish Radio Symphony Orchestra, Royal Stockholm Philharmonic Orchestra, Mozarteum Orchester Salzburg, Konzerthaus Orchestra Berlin, and the Verbier Festival Orchestra. She has performed at the Deutsche Oper Berlin, Teatro Real, Madrid, Theater an der Wien, Royal Swedish Opera, Stockholm, La Monnaie, Brussels, and Staatsoper Hamburg.

== Recordings ==
Ingela Brimberg has made several opera recordings on CD, including Wagner's Der fliegende Holländer, Paris version, conducted by Marc Minkowski (Naive 2014), and Verbier Festival: Best of 2014 (Erato, 2015). She is featured on two DVD recordings, Wagner's Der fliegende Holländer (Harmonia Mundi, 2017), and Strauss's Elektra (C Major, 2015).

== Personal life ==
Brimberg lives in Stockholm. She is married to Ulf Tengzelius and has two children.
