= John Storgårds =

Finnish conductor (born 1963)

- Born: John Gunnar Rafael Storgårds; 20 October 1963 (age 63); Helsinki, Finland
- Education: Sibelius Academy
- Occupations: Conductor and violinist
- Years active: 1984–present
- Spouse: Kati Postila (m. 2008)
- Children: 2
- Parent(s): Gunnar Storgårds, Marjatta (Ikonen) Storgårds

John Gunnar Rafael Storgårds (born 20 October 1963) is a Finnish conductor and violinist.

== Biography ==
John Storgårds studied violin with Esther Raitio and Jouko Ignatius at the Sibelius Academy in Helsinki, and continued his violin studies with Chaim Taub in Israel. He was a founding member of the Avanti! Chamber Orchestra. After experience leading orchestras from the front desk of the violin section, his interest in conducting increased after an invitation to conduct the Helsinki University Symphony Orchestra. He returned to the Sibelius Academy from 1993 to 1997 to study conducting with Jorma Panula and Eri Klas.

In 1996, Storgårds became Artistic Director of the Chamber Orchestra of Lapland. With the Helsinki Philharmonic Orchestra, he became Principal Guest Conductor in 2003 and Chief Conductor in 2008, for an initial contract of 4 years. His Helsinki contract was extended to 2014 and Storgårds concluded his Helsinki tenure in 2015. From 2006 to 2009, he was Chief Conductor of the Tampere Philharmonic Orchestra. Storgårds has held the Artistic Directorships of many summer festivals, most recently the Korsholm Music Festival from 2004 to 2006, and Avanti!'s Summer Sounds Festival. In 2017, he conducted the premiere of Sebastian Fagerlund's Autumn Sonata. In 2024, the Turku Philharmonic Orchestra announced the appointment of Storgårds as its next chief conductor, effective with the 2024–2025 season, with an initial contract of four seasons.

Outside Finland, Storgårds first guest-conducted the BBC Philharmonic in 2010. In 2011, the orchestra named him its principal guest conductor, effective January 2012. In 2017, the BBC Philharmonic changed Storgårds' title with the orchestra to chief guest conductor. In November 2022, the BBC Philharmonic named Storgårds its chief conductor, with immediate effect. In June 2025, the BBC Philharmonic announced the extension of Storgårds' contract as its chief conductor to 2028. In November 2026, the BBC Philharmonic announced that Storgårds is to stand down as its chief conductor at the close of the 2027–2028 season and subsequently to take the title of conductor laureate with the orchestra.

In 2013, Storgårds first guest-conducted the National Arts Centre Orchestra (NACO). In 2015, the NACO named Storgårds as its new principal guest conductor, only the second conductor ever to hold the title, effective with the 2015–2016 season with an initial contract of three seasons. In 2025, the NACO announced the appointment of Storgårds as its next music director, effective with the 2026–2027 season.

Storgårds first worked with the Junge Deutsche Philharmonie in 2024. In 2025, the Junge Deutsche Philharmonie announced his appointment as its next new principal conductor and artistic advisor, effective in 2026.

Storgårds received the Finnish State Prize for Music in 2002. He has made several international recordings for Ondine, Sony, BIS, Da Capo Records, and Chandos Records, including recordings of music by Andrzej Panufnik, John Corigliano, Per Nørgård, and George Antheil. His recording of Pēteris Vasks's violin concerto Distant Light and Symphony No. 2 won the Cannes Classical Disc of the Year Award in 2004. In 2014, his recording with the BBC Philharmonic of the complete symphonies of Jean Sibelius was released, including his second recording of three fragments of the Eighth Symphony.

Storgårds and his wife, Kati Postila, have two sons.

Cultural offices
Preceded by Eri Klas	Chief Conductor, Tampere Philharmonic Orchestra; 2006–2009	Succeeded by Hannu Lintu
Preceded by Leif Segerstam	Chief Conductor, Helsinki Philharmonic Orchestra; 2008–2015	Succeeded by Susanna Mälkki
Preceded by Omer Meir Wellber	Chief Conductor, BBC Philharmonic; 2022–present	Succeeded by incumbent
Preceded by Olli Mustonen	Chief Conductor, Turku Philharmonic Orchestra; 2024–present	Succeeded by incumbent
Preceded by Alexander Shelley	Music Director, National Arts Centre Orchestra; 2026–present	Succeeded by incumbent
