= Sebastian Fagerlund =

Finnish composer

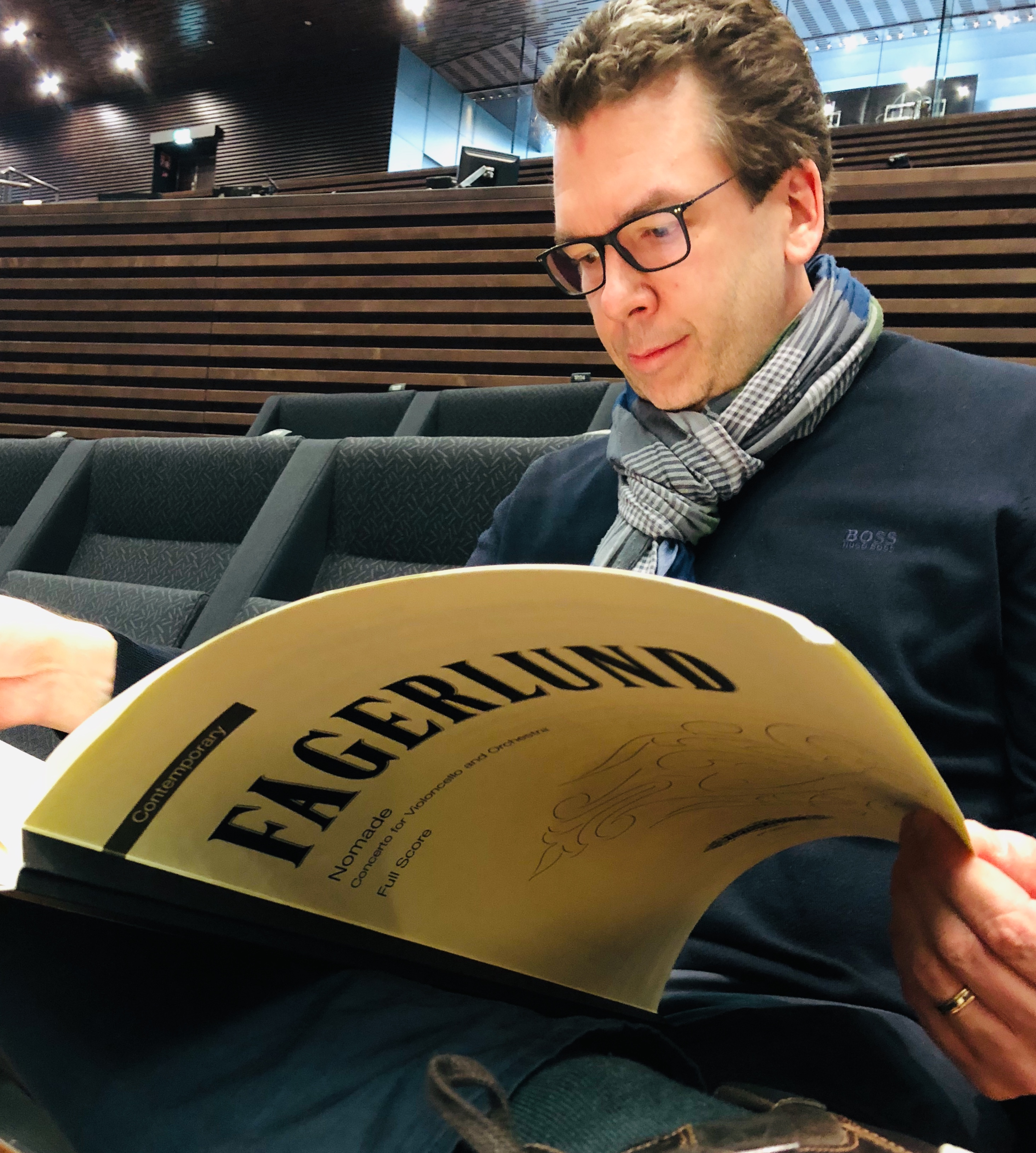
Composer Sebastian Fagerlund

Sebastian Fagerlund (born 6 December 1972) is a Finnish composer. He is described as “a post-modern impressionist whose sound landscapes can be heard as ecstatic nature images which, however, are always inner images, landscapes of the mind”. Echoes of Western culture, Asian musical traditions, and heavy metal have all been detected in his music.

His output covers a wide variety of genres, ranging from opera to chamber music and works for solo instruments. The most prominent are his concertos and his works for orchestra.

From 2013 until 2019, Fagerlund was the artistic director of the RUSK Chamber Music Festival together with clarinetist Christoffer Sundqvist.

Fagerlund was the Composer in Residence of the Royal Concertgebouw in Amsterdam for the 2016–17 season and in 2018 was the invited guest composer at the Aspen Music Festival. In the 2021–22 season, Fagerlund was Artist in Residence at the Tapiola Sinfonietta.

== Early life ==
Fagerlund was born in Pargas. He began his musical studies with violin lessons at the Turku Conservatory, where his teacher was Simo Vuoristo. After a year spent studying in the Netherlands, he applied for the Sibelius Academy to study composition and graduated from the class of Erkki Jokinen in 2004. He has also attended master classes with Michael Jarrell, Magnus Lindberg, Ivan Fedele and others.

== Compositions ==
The Clarinet Concerto (2006) marked a turning point in Fagerlund's career as a composer, and was followed by the tone poem Isola (Island, 2007), another major orchestral work. Both works were premiered at the Korsholm Music Festival. His surrealistic chamber opera Döbeln (2009), constructed around hallucinations, won the Record of the Year Award of the Finnish Broadcasting Company (Yle) and was a commission from the West Coast Opera Kokkola. Further works include Ignite (2010) and the violin concerto Darkness in Light, written for Pekka Kuusisto and immensely successful when premiered in Tampere in September 2012. The concerto was partly inspired by the literature of Haruki Murakami. The guitar concerto, Transit (2013), commissioned by Yle and premiered by Ismo Eskelinen has continued Fagerlund's series of concertos.

Fagerlund has said: “A sort of primitivism is present in many of my works. As a result, rhythm, in particular, has become very important. I am fascinated by relentless drive and energy.”. Salient features of Fagerlund's music are his interest in large-scale forms and details of them, and a view of music as the expresser of fundamental questions and existential experiences.

Works by Fagerlund have been performed around the world by the Singapore Symphony Orchestra, the Finnish Radio Symphony Orchestra, the Orchestra Sinfonica Nazionale della RAI, BBC Symphony Orchestra, Bergen Philharmonic Orchestra, the Gothenburg Symphony and the Dutch Radio Philharmonic Orchestra.

Fagerlund's 2017 opera Autumn Sonata, with a libretto by the composer and Gunilla Hemming, based on the 1979 film by Ingmar Bergman, was premiered at the Finnish National Opera in Helsinki conducted by John Storgårds; Anne Sofie von Otter created the principal role of Charlotte. His new opera The Morning Star, an adaptation of Karl Ove Knausgård’s novel of the same name also on a libretto by Hemming, will be premiered at the Finnish National Opera in January 2026.

== Prizes ==
- 2010 – Nominated for the Nordic Music Prize for Sky
- 2010 – Record of the Year Award of the Yle music editors for the recording of Döbeln
- 2011 – Emma Award for best classical, for the orchestral Isola
- 2011 – Teosto Prize for the orchestral Ignite
- 2011 – Ignite selected as a recommended work at the International Rostrum of Composers in Vienna
- 2016 – Nominated for the Nordic Council Music Prize for Mana – Concerto for Bassoon and Orchestra
- 2018 – Shortlisted in the International Opera Awards 2018 for Autumn Sonata
- 2018 – Nominated for the Fondation Prince Pierre de Monaco Musical Composition Prize with Opera Autumn Sonata
- 2019 – The Grand Cultural Prize awarded by the Swedish Cultural Foundation in Finland

== Works ==
=== Stage ===
- Döbeln (opera), opera (2008–2009)
- Höstsonaten (Autumn Sonata), opera (2014–2016)
- The Morning Star (January 2026)

=== Orchestral ===
- Renergies (2003)
- Partita (2007/09)
- Isola (2007)
- Ignite (2010)
- Stonework (2014–2015)
- Strings to the Bone (2015)
- Skylines, fanfare for orchestra (2016)
- Drifts (2017)
- Water Atlas (2017–2018)
- Chamber Symphony (2021)
- Beneath (2022)

=== Concertante ===
- Emanations for solo clarinet, two percussion players, string orchestra (1998)
- Saxophone Concerto (2004)
- Clarinet Concerto (2005–2006)
- Violin Concerto Darkness in Light (2012)
- Stone on Stone for amplified cello and ensemble (2012)
- Silent Words (version for cello and string orchestra) (2013)
- Guitar Concerto Transit (2013)
- Bassoon Concerto Mana (2013‒2014)
- Cello Concerto Nomade (2018)
- Flute Concerto Terral (2021)
- Lanterna, seven settings for piano trio and orchestra (2023)
- Arcantio, for double bass and chamber orchestra (2023)
- Helena's Song, for violin and orchestra (2023)

=== Chamber ===
- Imaginary Landscapes for ensemble (9 players) (2002)
- Short Stories for saxophone quartet (2002)
- Clarinet Quintet (2004)
- Breathe for clarinet, accordion and cello (2005–2006)
- Cadenza for clarinet and instrument with low range (2006)
- String Quartet No. 1 (2006–2007)
- Scherzic for viola and cello (2008)
- Sky for Baroque ensemble (2008)
- Traces and Shadows for cello and piano (2009–2010)
- Sky II for ensemble (10 players) (2009)
- Oceano for violin, viola and cello (2010–2011)
- Rush for violin, clarinet, two pianos and cimbalom (2010–2011)
- Exhibit for ensemble (2010)
- Fuel for clarinet, cello and piano (2010)
- Rounds for clarinet and piano (2011)
- Rush II “Aldeburgh Version” for violin, clarinet, cimbalom and piano 4 hands (2011)
- Clarinet Sonata (2011)
- Silent Words for cello and piano (2013)
- Transient Light for horn, violin, cello and piano (2013)
- Stilla for violin and piano (2014)
- Windways for recorder quartet (2015–16)
- Octet Autumn Equinox for clarinet, bassoon, horn, 2 violins, viola, cello and double bass (2016)
- String Quartet No. 2 From the Ground (2017)
- Fuel II for flute, clarinet, violin, violoncello, piano (2018)
- Woodlands Variations for bassoon and string quartet (2018)
- Remain for piano trio (2022)

=== Solo ===
- Flow for clarinet (1999)
- Ground for alto saxophone (1999/2001)
- Environs for organ (2003)
- Reminiscence for violin (2003)
- Recordanza for tenor recorder (2005)
- 6 Piano Pieces (for young players) (2007)
- Licht im Licht for piano (2007)
- Kromos for guitar (2011)
- Woodlands for bassoon (2012)
- Materie for violin (2019)
- Recitativo for cello (2021)

=== Vocal/Choral ===
- Liten svit for baritone and piano (2001)
- Revontulet soprano and piano (2001)
- Sinnlighetens fest for male choir (2002)
- Höga lågor, stilla vatten for soprano, mezzo-soprano, baritone and chamber orchestra (2003)
- Teckning (Drawing) for male choir (2006)
- Staden 3 songs for soprano and piano (2009)
- Nocturne for female choir (2010)
- Dream Land for male choir (2019)

=== Electronic ===
- Element for 8-channel tape (1998)

== Discography ==
- 2023 - Terral – Strings to the Bone, Chamber Symphony, Sharon Bezaly, flute, Tapiola Sinfonietta, cond. John Storgårds, BIS-2639
- 2022 – Breathe – Trio Klangspectrum, GENUIN
- 2021 – Nomade – Cello Concerto, Water Atlas, Nicolas Altstaedt, cello, Finnish Radio Symphony Orchestra, cond. Hannu Lintu, BIS-2455
- 2021 – Oceano – Chamber Music by Sebastian Fagerlund, String Quartet Meta4, Paavali Jumppanen, piano, Christoffer Sundqvist, clarinet, Hervé Joulain, horn, BIS-2324
- 2020 – Kromos – 21st Century Guitar Music, Ismo Eskelinen, guitar, BIS-2395
- 2018 – Höstsonaten (Autumn Sonata), Anne Sofie von Otter, Erika Sunnegårdh, Helena Juntunen, Tommi Hakala, Nicholas Söderlund, Finnish National Opera Chorus & Orchestra, cond. John Storgårds, BIS-2357
- 2018 – Stonework, Drifts, Transit – Guitar Concerto, Ismo Eskelinen, guitar, Finnish Radio Symphony Orchestra, cond. Hannu Lintu, BIS-2295
- 2016 – Mana – Bassoon Concerto, Woodlands, Bram van Sambeek, bassoon, Lahti Symphony Orchestra, cond. Okko Kamu, BIS-2206 (with Bassoon Concerto by Kalevi Aho)
- 2015 – Darkness in Light – Violin Concerto, Ignite, Pekka Kuusisto, violin, Finnish Radio Symphony Orchestra, cond. Hannu Lintu, BIS-2093.
- 2011 – Clarinet Concerto, Partita, Isola, Christoffer Sundqvist, clarinet, Gothenburg Symphony Orchestra, cond. Dima Slobodeniouk, BIS-SACD-1707.
- 2010 – Döbeln, West Coast Kokkola Opera, cond. Sakari Oramo, BIS-SACD-1780.
- 2010 – Short Stories, The Academic Saxophone Quartet, OPTCD-10007-8.
- 2010 – Licht im Licht, Risto-Matti Marin, ABCD 305.
- 2009 – Imaginary Landscapes, Turku Ensemble, JJVCD-69.
- 2007 – Northern Lights, Anu Komsi, soprano, Pia Värri, piano, ABCD 231.
- 2005 – Saxophone Concerto, Olli-Pekka Tuomisalo, saxophone, Chamber Orchestra Avanti!, cond. Dmitri Slobodeniouk, JaseCD 0042.
- 2003 – Imaginary Landscape, Uusinta Chamber Ensemble, UUCD 101.
- 2002 – Sinnlighetens fest, Polytech Choir, cond. Juha Kuivanen, PKCD 19.
- 2001 – Ground, Olli-Pekka Tuomisalo, alto saxophone, FSSCD-01001.
- 2001 – Ground, Olli-Pekka Tuomisalo, alto saxophone, Risto-Matti Marin, piano, OPTCD-01003-4.
- 2000 – Emanations, Turku Conservatoire Orchestra, Christoffer Sundqvist, clarinet, cond. Sauli Huhtala, KACD2001-2.
