= Benny Fredriksson =

Swedish actor and theatre director (1959–2018)

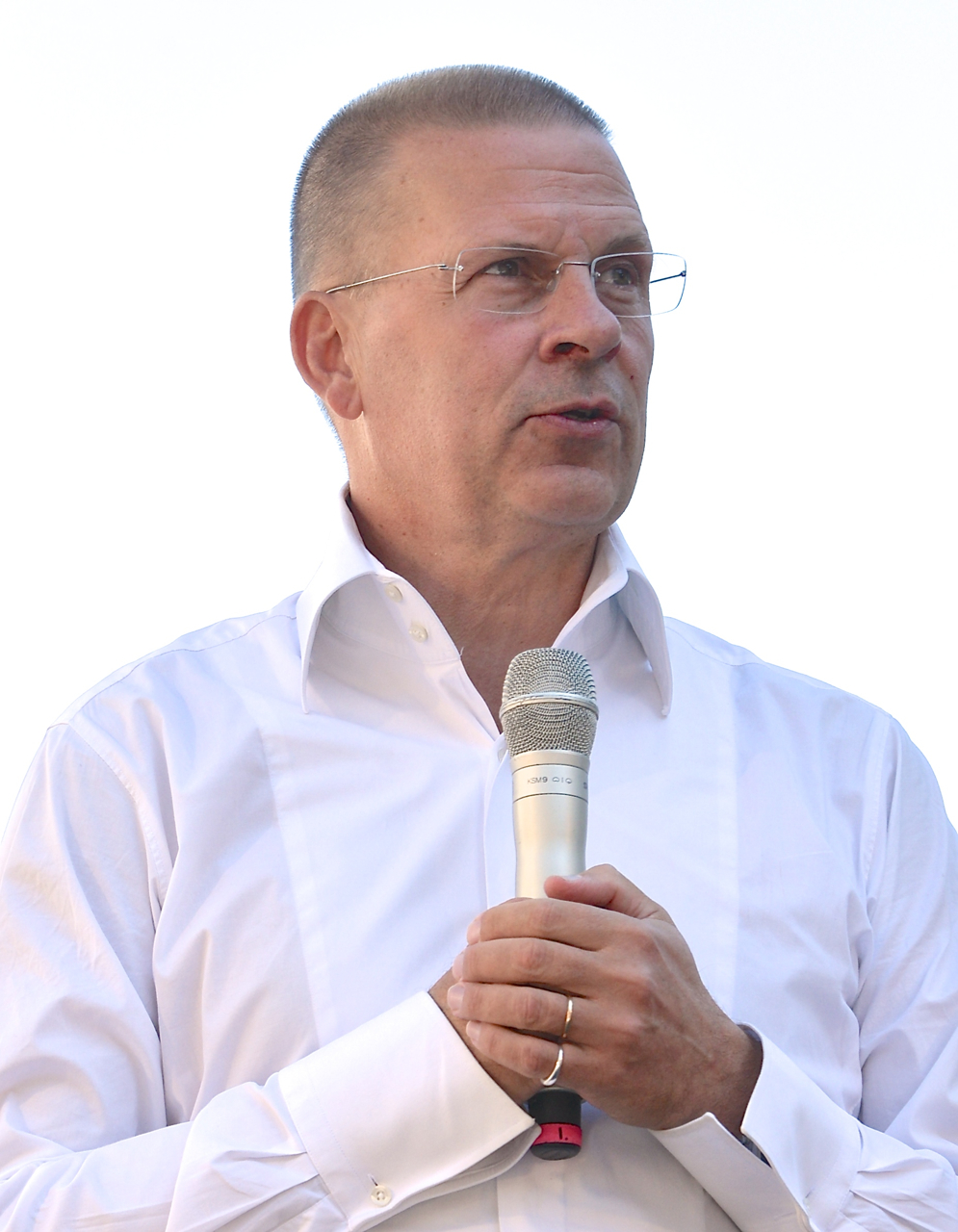
- Fredriksson in August 2013
- Born: Benny Holger Fredriksson; 2 July 1959; Hägersten, Sweden
- Died: 17 March 2018 (aged 58); Sydney, Australia
- Education: National Academy of Dramatic Art
- Occupations: Actor, theatre director
- Spouse: Anne Sofie von Otter (m. 1989)
- Children: 2

Benny Holger Fredriksson (2 July 1959 – 17 March 2018) was a Swedish actor, theatre director, and CEO of Stockholm City Theatre, Sweden.

== Career ==
From 1979 to 1982, Fredriksson studied at the National Academy of Dramatic Art in Stockholm. At the age of sixteen, he was a ticketer at Stockholm City Theatre. After finishing his education, he worked as an actor and director at the Royal Swedish Opera, Gothenburg City Theatre, National Swedish Touring Theatre, Drottningholm Palace Theatre and Stockholm City Theatre. Later he served as art director at Parkteatern and ensemble boss at Stockholm City Theatre before he became CEO and theatre chief at Stockholm City Theatre in 2002. After sixteen years as CEO, Fredriksson resigned in December 2017.

== Death & Allegations ==
While on holiday in Sydney, Australia, Fredriksson committed suicide on 17 March 2018. Three months previously accusations had been made of sexual harassment and that he had allowed a culture of sexual harassment as CEO of the Stockholm City Theatre. A preliminary report in March 2018 found no evidence that Fredriksson had engaged in such conduct, and the newspaper that originally had reported the accusations has since indicated that some reports were misleading.

== Personal life ==
Fredriksson was the son of Nils Holger Fredriksson and Ulla Maria Fredriksson; he grew up in a working class home in Hägersten. From 1989 until his death in 2018, he was married to Anne Sofie von Otter, Sweden's most notable mezzo-soprano.

== Filmography ==
- Sammansvärjningen (TV Series, 1986)
- Kära farmor (TV Series, 1990)
