= Permanent Representative of Sweden to the European Union =

- Lesser coat of arms of the Kingdom of Sweden

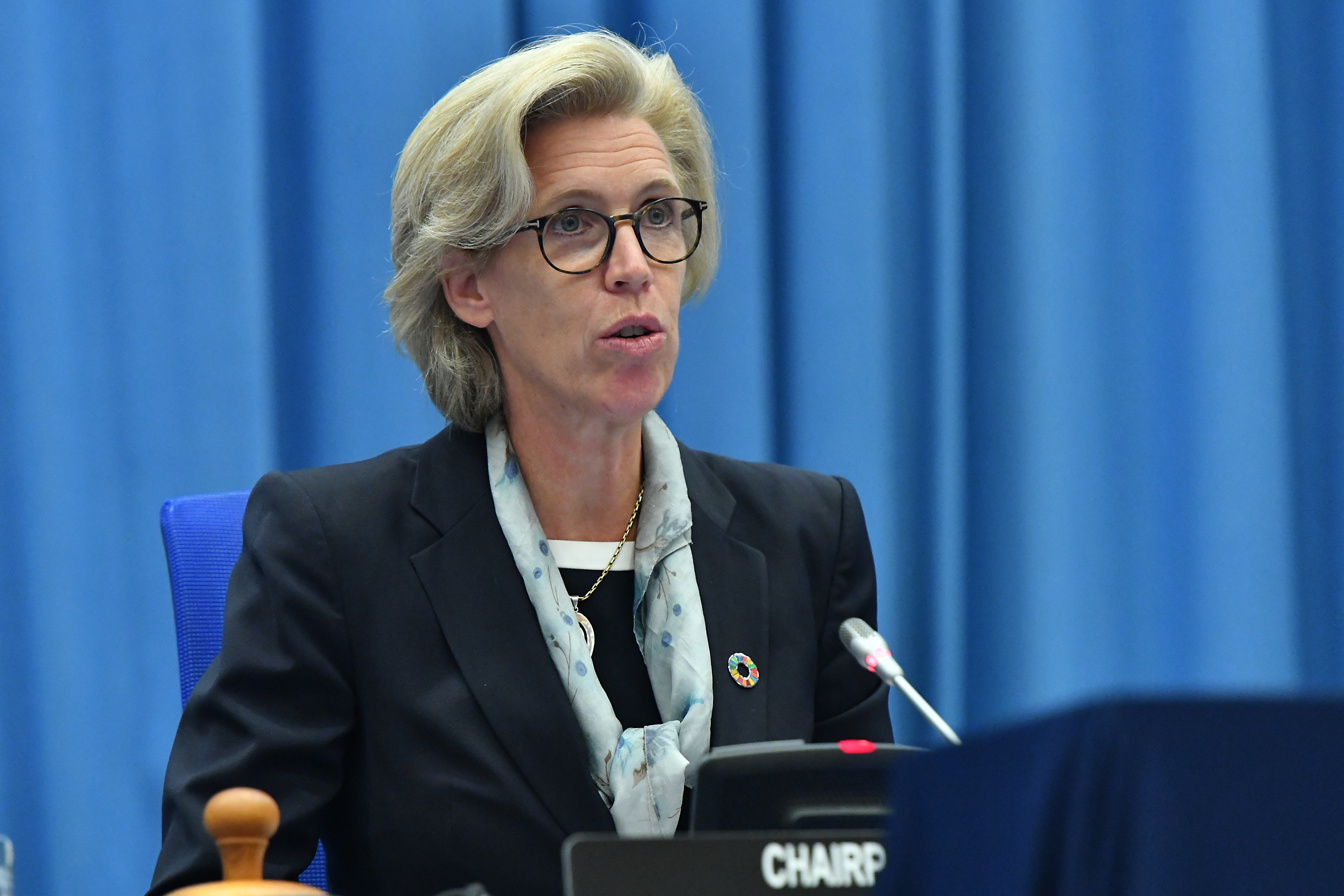
- Incumbent; Mikaela Kumlin Granit since August 2023
- Ministry for Foreign Affairs; Permanent Representation of Sweden to the European Union
- Style: His or Her Excellency (formal); Mr. or Madam Ambassador (informal)
- Member of: Committee of Permanent Representatives
- Reports to: Minister for Foreign Affairs
- Residence: Avenue Géo Bernier 13
- Seat: Square de Meeûs 30, 1000 Brussels, Belgium
- Appointer: Government of Sweden
- Term length: No fixed term
- Precursor: Permanent Representative to the ECSC/EC
- Formation: 1994 (Note: The predecessor to the current post was established in 1952, and Lennart Finnmark was Sweden's first permanent representative to the EU's forerunner, the European Coal and Steel Community (ECSC).)
- First holder: Frank Belfrage
- Deputy: Deputy Permanent Representative
- Website: www.swedenabroad.se/en/embassies/european-union/

The Permanent Representative of Sweden to the European Union is Sweden's top diplomat to the EU, serving as head of the Permanent Representation of Sweden to the European Union in Brussels, Belgium. This position holds the rank of ambassador and plays a central role in shaping and advancing Sweden's interests within the EU institutions. The permanent representative works closely with Swedish government ministries and other member states to coordinate policies, negotiate legislation, and represent Sweden in high-level EU meetings, including the Committee of Permanent Representatives (COREPER).

Sweden's engagement with the EU has evolved significantly over the decades, beginning long before its formal accession. The history of the permanent representative's role stretches back to Sweden's early diplomatic relations with the EU's precursors in the 1950s, through to the country's full membership in 1995.

== History ==
The European Union (EU) traces its origins to the European Coal and Steel Community (ECSC), established in 1952. On 10 December of that year, a Swedish diplomatic delegation of four presented their letters of credence to the High Authority of the ECSC in Luxembourg. Sweden was the first country outside the union to send a diplomatic mission to its headquarters. Lennart Finnmark was appointed as Sweden's first Permanent Representative of Sweden to the High Authority of the European Coal and Steel Community.

Starting in 1957, the Permanent Representative of Sweden to the Council of Europe in Strasbourg was also accredited to the ECSC, and from 1959, also to the European Atomic Energy Community (Euratom) and the European Economic Community (EEC). Together, the ECSC, Euratom, and EEC formed the European Communities (EC). From 1972 onward, the position was titled Permanent Representative of Sweden to the European Communities. (Note: Until 1972, the officeholder served as head of the Delegation of Sweden to the High Authority of the European Coal and Steel Community (ECSC), the European Atomic Energy Community (Euratom) and the European Economic Community (EEC) (Swedish: Sveriges delegation hos den europeiska kol- och stålunionens Höga Myndighet (CECA), Europeiska atomenergigemenskapen (Euratom) och Europeiska ekonomiskagemenskapen (EEC)). From 1972 onward, it was referred to as the Delegation of Sweden to the European Communities (Swedish: Sveriges delegation hos de europeiska gemenskaperna (EG)).)

In October 1990, the Swedish Government declared its intention to pursue EU membership. In July 1991, Prime Minister Ingvar Carlsson formally submitted Sweden's application, and detailed negotiations began in Brussels in February 1993. These negotiations lasted just over a year, culminating in a referendum on 13 November 1994, which determined Sweden's accession to the EU.

On 24 November 1994, the chief negotiator for the EEA – later EU – negotiations, Frank Belfrage, was appointed as Sweden's first Permanent Representative of Sweden to the European Union in Brussels.

== Tasks ==
The Permanent Representative of Sweden to the European Union holds the rank of ambassador and serves as head of mission. Together with two other ambassadors and the head of administration, the Permanent Representative heads the Permanent Representation of Sweden to the European Union in Brussels. The ambassadors of the EU member states prepare for upcoming Council meetings through the Committee of Permanent Representatives, known as COREPER. Sweden's permanent representative participates in COREPER II, where ambassadors meet weekly to prepare the work of four Council configurations:

- Economic and Financial Affairs
- Foreign Affairs
- General Affairs
- Justice and Home Affairs

Sweden's deputy permanent representative, who also holds the rank of ambassador, serves as deputy head of mission and represents Sweden in COREPER I. This group prepares for the following Council configurations:

- Agriculture and Fisheries
- Environment
- Competitiveness
- Transport, Telecommunications and Energy
- Education, Youth, Culture and Sport
- Employment, Social Policy, Health and Consumer Affairs

== List of representatives ==
=== Permanent representatives ===
Name	Period	Title	Notes	Ref
Permanent Representative of Sweden to the High Authority of the European Coal and Steel Community (ECSC): 1952–1959
Lennart Finnmark	1952–1956	Counsellor		
Karl-Gustav Lagerfelt	1 May 1956 – 1959	Envoy	Also Permanent Representative to the CoE (from 1957).	
Permanent Representative of Sweden to the ECSC, Euratom, and the EEC: 1959–1972
Karl-Gustav Lagerfelt	1959–1963	Ambassador	Also Permanent Representative to the CoE, the ECSC, Euratom, and the EEC.	
Sten Lindh	1964–1968	Ambassador	Also Permanent Representative to the CoE, the ECSC, Euratom, and the EEC.	
Sven Backlund	1968–1972	Ambassador	Also Permanent Representative to the CoE (until 30 March 1971), the ECSC, Euratom, and the EEC.	
Permanent Representative of Sweden to the European Communities (EC): 1972–1994
Erik von Sydow	1972–1978	Ambassador		
Bengt Rabaeus	1978–1983	Ambassador		
Stig Brattström	1983–1991	Ambassador		
Lars Anell	1992–1996	Ambassador		
Permanent Representative of Sweden to the European Union (EU): 1994–present
Frank Belfrage	1994–1999	Ambassador		
Gunnar Lund	1999–2002	Ambassador		
Sven-Olof Petersson	2002–2008	Ambassador		
Christian Danielsson	2008–2010	Ambassador		
Dag Hartelius	2011–2013	Ambassador		
Anders Ahnlid	1 November 2013 – 2016	Ambassador		
Lars Danielsson	7 November 2016 – 2023	Ambassador		
Mikaela Kumlin Granit	August 2023 – present	Ambassador		

=== Deputy permanent representatives ===
Name	Period	Title	Notes	Ref
European Communities (EC): –1994
Iwo Dölling	1965–1970	Embassy Counselor		
Iwo Dölling	1970–1972	Minister		
?	1972–1974	Embassy Counselor		
Hans-Olle Olsson	1974–1978	Embassy Counselor		
Karl-Vilhelm Wöhler	1979–1984	Minister		
Olof Allgårdh	1984–1988	Minister		
Anders Olander	1988–1991	Minister		
Christer Asp	1992–1994	Minister		
European Union (EU): 1994–present
Christer Asp	1994–1995	Minister		
Lars-Olof Lindgren	1995–2002	Minister		
Ingrid Hjelt af Trolle	2002–2007	Ambassador		
Ulrika Barklund Larsson	2007–2009	Ambassador		
Jan Olsson	2009–2014	Ambassador		
Åsa Webber	2014–2019	Ambassador		
Torbjörn Haak	2019–2024	Ambassador		
Karin Eckerdal	2024–present	Ambassador		
