= Permanent Representation of Sweden to the European Union =

Diplomatic mission of Sweden to the European Union

- Location: Brussels, Belgium
- Address: Square de Meeûs 30; 1000 Brussels
- Coordinates: 50.84068°N 4.36973°E
- Opened: 1 January 1995 (Note: Sweden's permanent representation became operational when Sweden became a member of the European Union (EU) on 1 January 1995, but it has its origins in Sweden's delegations to the ECSC, Euratom, EEC which were established in the 1950s.)
- Jurisdiction: European Union
- Permanent representative: Mikaela Kumlin Granit
- Website: Official website

The Permanent Representation of Sweden to the European Union in Brussels, Belgium serves as an extension of the Swedish government and represents Sweden in its relations with the institutions of the European Union. It is Sweden's largest diplomatic mission abroad. Its primary role is to promote and safeguard Swedish interests and policies within the EU's decision-making processes.

The representation functions as a link between the Swedish Government Offices and the EU institutions, including the European Commission, the Council of the European Union, and the European Parliament. It participates in negotiations, monitors legislative and policy developments, and coordinates Sweden's positions on EU matters.

Staffed by officials from all Swedish government ministries, the representation reflects the wide range of policy areas covered by EU cooperation. In addition to its role in negotiations and policy coordination, it also provides information about Sweden's work within the EU and receives visiting delegations from Sweden.

== History ==
The Permanent Representation of Sweden to the European Union (EU) has its roots in the country's early contacts with the European Communities (EC). As early as the 1950s, when the European Coal and Steel Community (ECSC) was established in 1952, Sweden set up the Delegation of Sweden to the High Authority of the European Coal and Steel Community in Luxembourg City to follow developments and engage in contacts, despite not being a member. When the Treaty of Rome in 1957 led to the creation of the European Economic Community (EEC) and the European Atomic Energy Community (Euratom), Sweden established delegations in 1959—Delegation of Sweden to the European Atomic Energy Community and the Delegation of Sweden to the European Economic Community in Brussels—to monitor its interests and cooperate with member states. These delegations were collectively known as the Delegation of Sweden to the European Communities.

With the Merger Treaty of 1965, which entered into force in 1967, the three institutions—ECSC, Euratom, and the EEC—were merged under a single Commission and a single Council. As a direct consequence, Sweden's representation was also unified. In the early 1970s, the previously separate delegations were merged, and the combined representation was named the Delegation of Sweden to the European Communities. The delegation functioned as a permanent representation in Brussels and enabled Sweden to take part in consultations, follow political and economic developments, and prepare for possible membership.

In October 1990, the Swedish Government declared its intention to pursue EU membership. In July 1991, Prime Minister Ingvar Carlsson formally submitted Sweden's application, and detailed negotiations began in Brussels in February 1993. These negotiations lasted just over a year, culminating in a referendum on 13 November 1994, which determined Sweden's accession to the EU. When Sweden became a member of the European Union on 1 January 1995, the permanent delegation was transformed into the Permanent Representation of Sweden to the European Union in Brussels, which has since served as the country's central diplomatic and political contact point with the EU institutions.

== Staff and tasks ==
The representation serves as an extension of the Swedish Government Offices in Brussels. Officials from all government ministries work here to promote and safeguard Sweden's interests within the EU. With around 120 staff members, it is Sweden's largest diplomatic mission abroad. In addition to representing Sweden in negotiations, an important part of the Representation's work is to provide information about Sweden's role and activities in the EU. Each year, it hosts approximately 150 Swedish visitor groups—around 3,500 people in total. These include school classes, expert delegations, and elected officials, who visit either in person or virtually.

The Permanent Representative of Sweden to the European Union holds the rank of ambassador and serves as head of mission. Together with two other ambassadors and the head of administration, the Permanent Representative leads Sweden's EU Representation in Brussels. The ambassadors of the EU member states prepare for upcoming Council meetings through the Committee of Permanent Representatives, known as COREPER. Sweden's permanent representative participates in COREPER II, where ambassadors meet weekly to prepare the work of four Council configurations:

- Economic and Financial Affairs
- Foreign Affairs
- General Affairs
- Justice and Home Affairs

Sweden's deputy permanent representative, who also holds the rank of ambassador, serves as deputy head of mission and represents Sweden in COREPER I. This group prepares for the following Council configurations:

- Agriculture and Fisheries
- Environment
- Competitiveness
- Transport, Telecommunications and Energy
- Education, Youth, Culture and Sport
- Employment, Social Policy, Health and Consumer Affairs

The third ambassador heads the representation's unit for foreign and security policy. This unit serves as an extension of the Swedish Ministry for Foreign Affairs in Brussels. The ambassador represents Sweden in the Political and Security Committee (PSC).

== Location ==
=== Chancery ===
In 1952, Sweden established a delegation to the High Authority of the European Coal and Steel Community in Luxembourg City. Its chancery was located from 1953 to 1960 at Boulevard Prince-Henri no. 1 in the Ville Haute district. In 1959, Sweden established delegations to Euratom and the European Economic Community (EEC) in Brussels, with a chancery from 1960 located at Rue Ducale 43, opposite Brussels Park in the Royal Quarter. All Swedish delegations were thereafter housed under one roof at Rue Ducale 43.

In 1963, the Swedish embassy in Brussels moved to new premises at Avenue Louise 148 in the southern part of the City of Brussels, on the border with the municipalities of Saint-Gilles and Ixelles. The Swedish delegations, which were soon merged into Sweden's delegation to the European Communities (EC), were located at the same address until 1973. From 1974 to 1993, the Swedish delegation was located at Robert Schuman Roundabout 6 in the European Quarter.

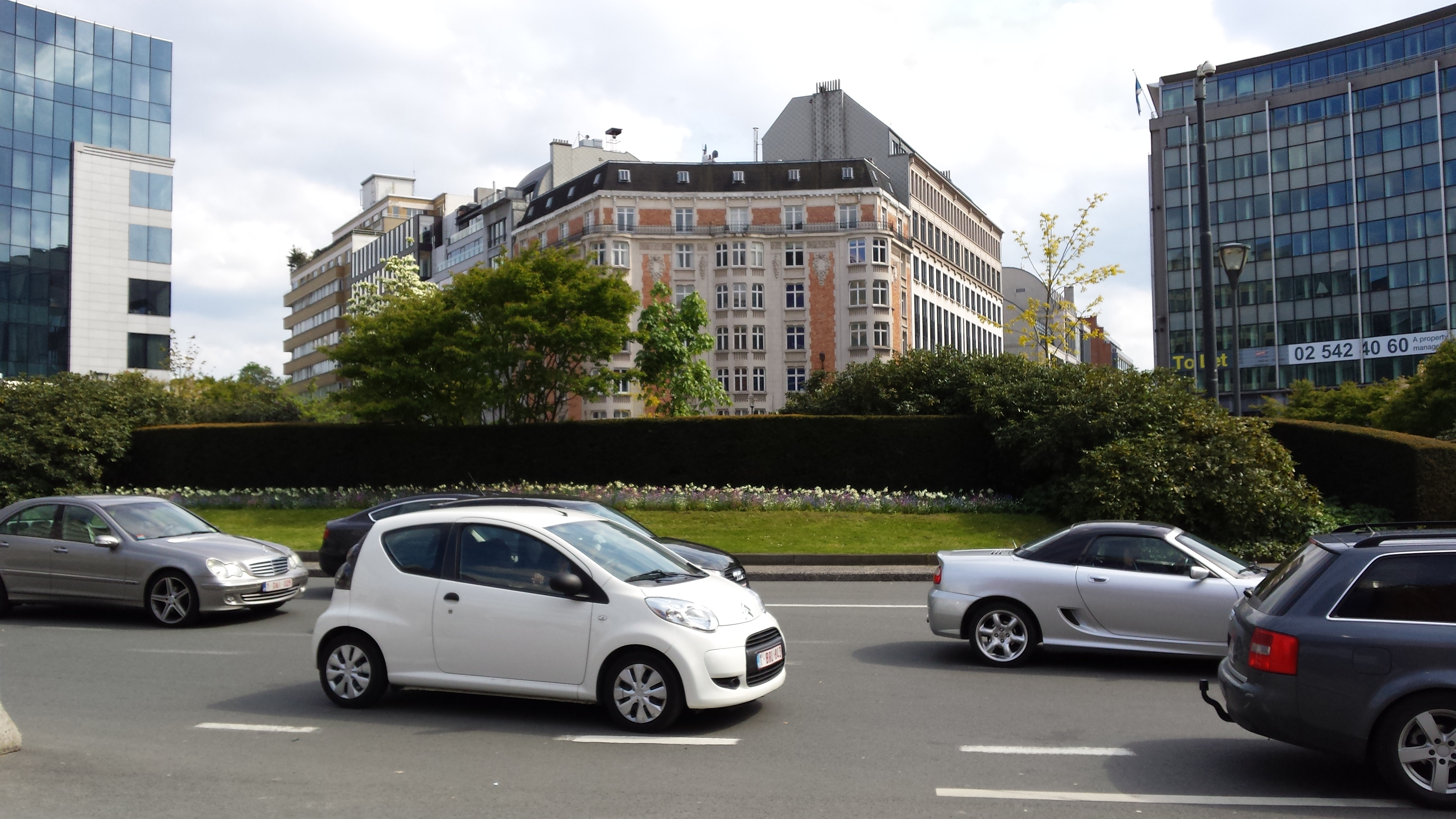
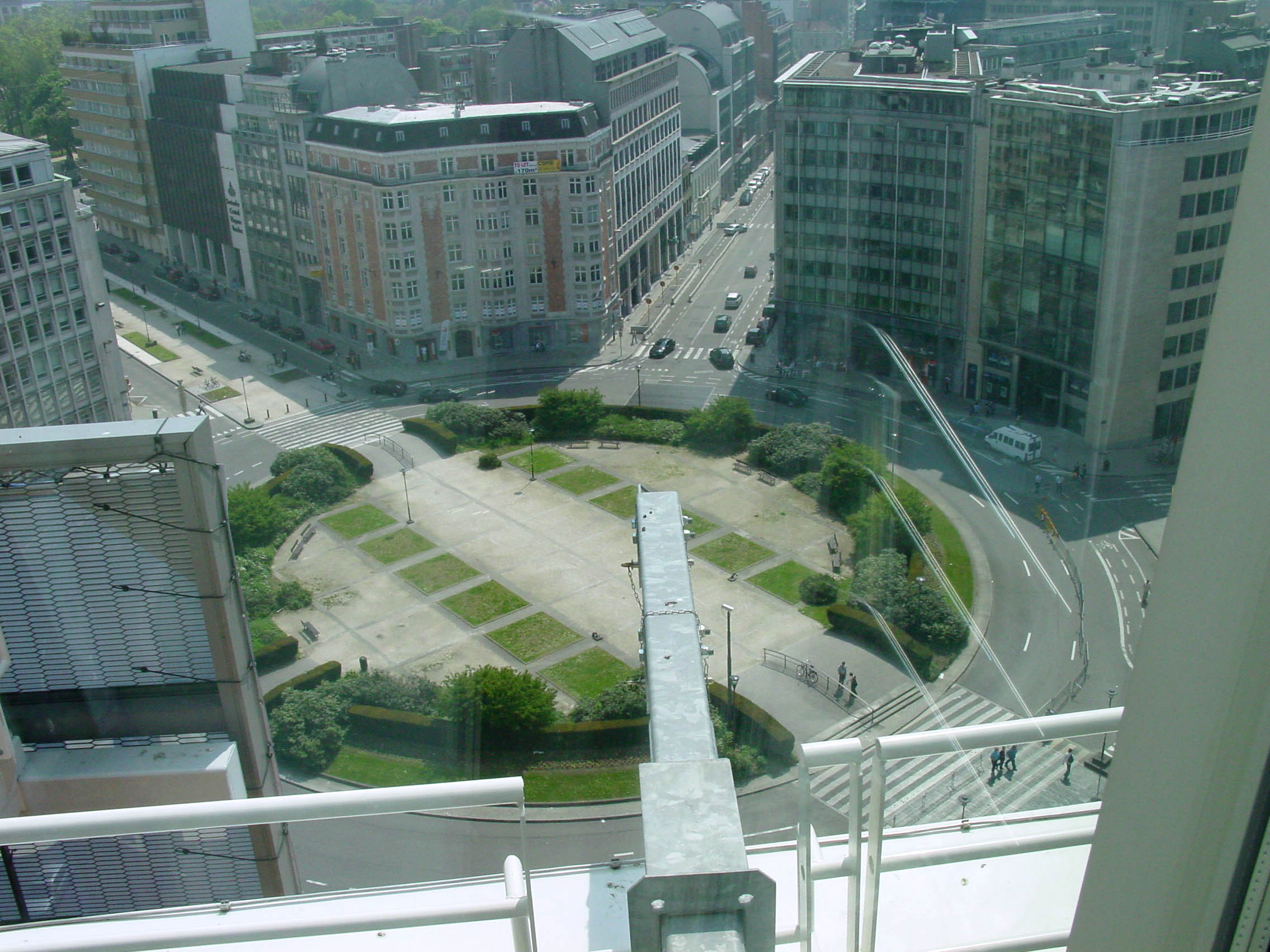
Robert Schuman Roundabout 6 (building to the right)

In 1994, the year before Sweden became a member of the European Union (EU), the delegation moved to Square de Meeûs 30, in the City of Brussels municipality. The chancery occupies a building designed in 1973 by architect Lucien Jacques Baucher, which was acquired by the Swedish state in 1991. It stands next to the Square de Meeûs park, named after a prominent Belgian family. The premises include office space, a garage, and facilities for meetings and official representation. The building is close to the Brussels-Luxembourg railway station.

In 2007–2008, Sweden's National Property Board carried out an extensive renovation of the premises. Architects Hans Birkholz and Stina Mac Kay of BAU Architects led the redesign, aimed at modernizing and optimizing the space in preparation for Sweden's EU presidency in 2009. The building's façade was also refurbished—sandblasted clean and equipped with new lighting to highlight its position on the square after dark. Before the renovation, much of the building consisted of deep office spaces along long corridors, also used for storage. The new layout introduced smaller offices with glass walls to create a more open and transparent environment. The redesign increased capacity from 80 to 120 workstations.

Interior design featured cool color tones on sunlit sides and warm tones on the north-facing side—a concept previously used by Swedish artist Carl Larsson. Interior designers Karin Johannesson Forsblad (Ministry for Foreign Affairs) and Eva Herdin (consultant) created cohesive workspaces by integrating existing storage furniture with new birchwood door elements. Accent walls, views of the park, and selected artworks added color, while the overall palette remained restrained. The previously varied floor layouts were unified into a consistent design.

A key objective of the renovation was to give the building's large art collection a more prominent role. Two new artworks were also commissioned for the reopening. In the Sweden Room, 19 modern icons painted on pearwood by Mats Bergquist are displayed. Artist David Taylor, known for combining function and form, created a custom lighting installation for the entrance.

After the Swedish embassy in Brussels closed in 2011, a consulate general was opened in 2020, located in the same building as the representation. On 1 September 2025, the consulate general was converted into an embassy with temporary premises in the same building as the representation.

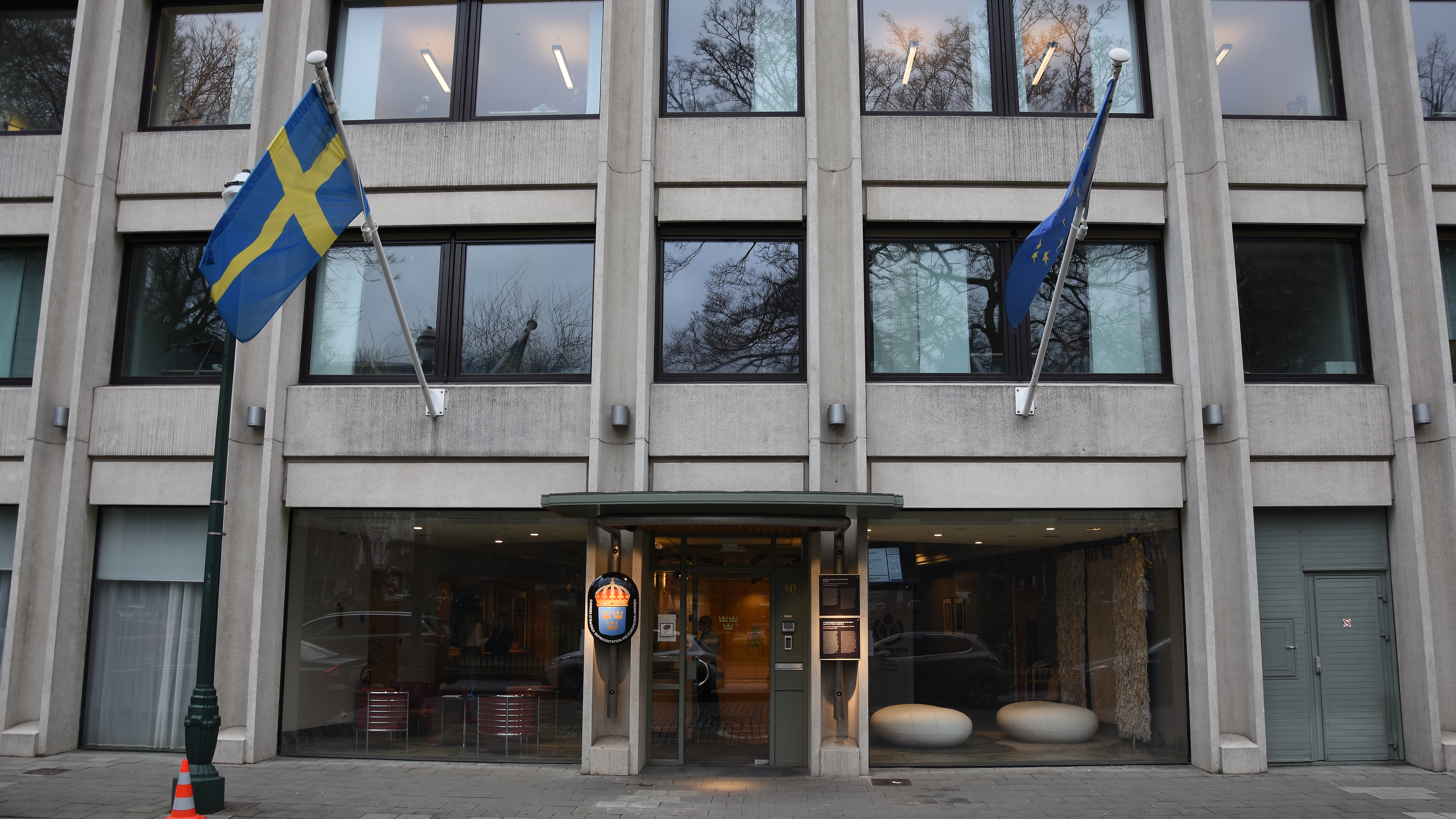
Entrance

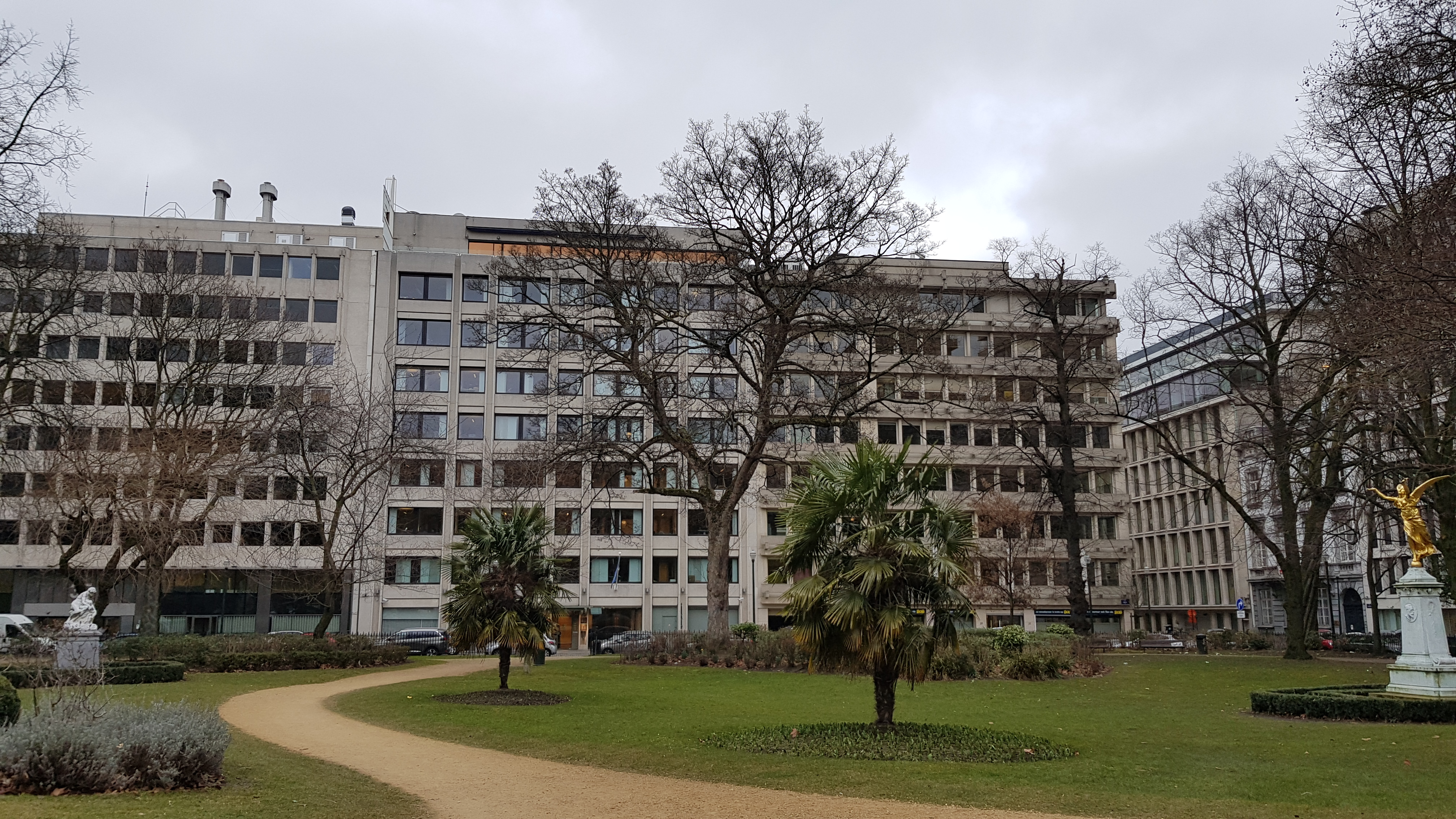
View from the Square de Meeûs

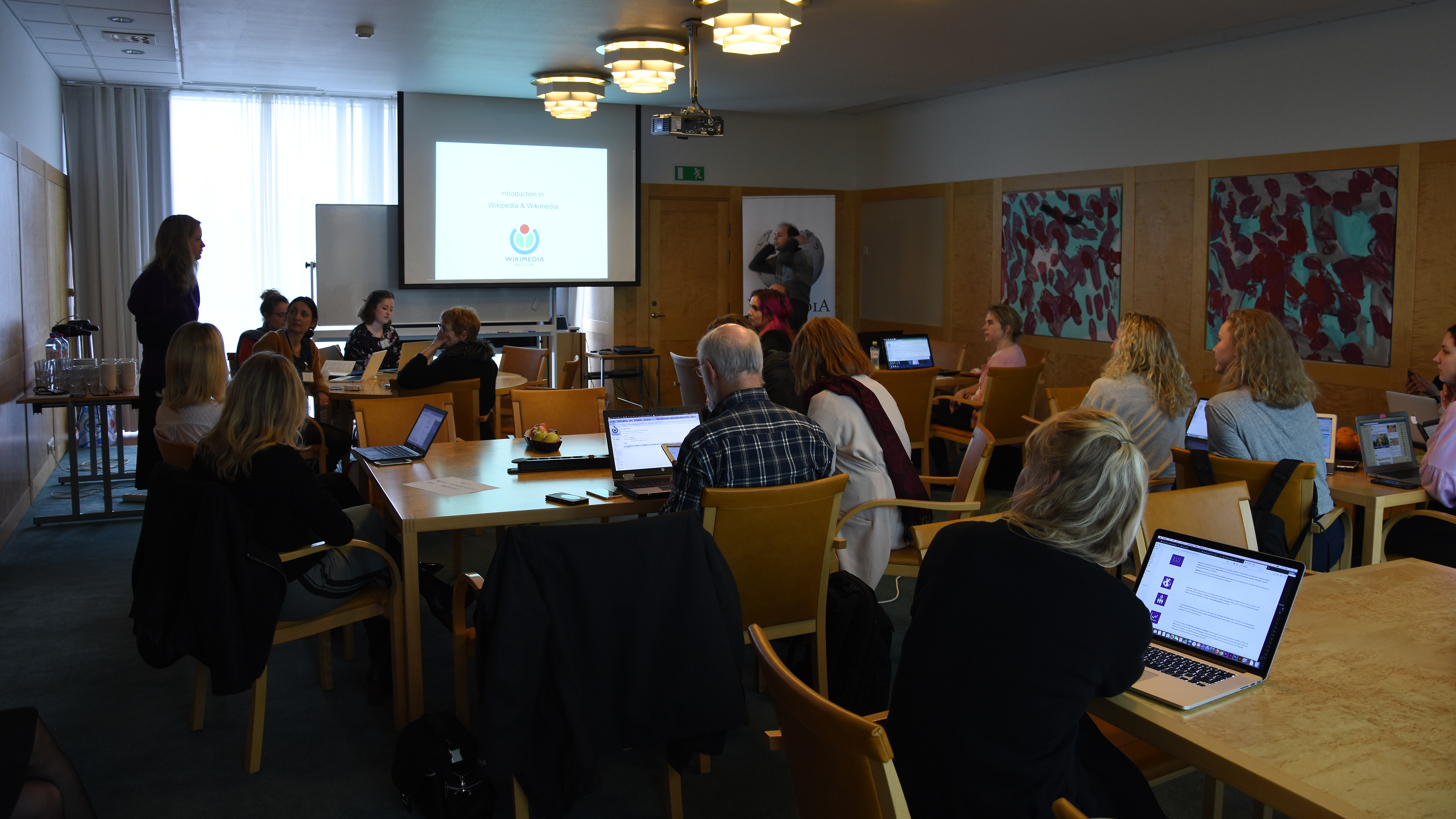
Conference room

=== Residence ===
The residence of the Swedish permanent representative was located at Avenue Émile De Mot 20 in the Louise/Louiza district in the mid- and late 1960s.

After the Swedish embassy in Brussels closed in 2011 (Note: The embassy reopened in 2025.) and the Swedish ambassador to Belgium became Stockholm-based instead, the Swedish permanent representative to the EU took over the Swedish ambassador's residence at Avenue Géo Bernier 13 in Ixelles. (Note: See, among other things:)

The house at Avenue Géo Bernier 13 was purchased by the Swedish state in 1928 on the initiative of then envoy Gustaf von Dardel. The house was designed in 1913 by the architect Adrien Blomme as a residence and architectural office for himself and his family. Blomme's family couldn't move in until 1916 due to the First World War.

Blomme, inspired by Italian Renaissance and Andrea Palladio's architecture, designed the house with four floors and a basement. It includes ceramic relief panels on the back, which are replicas of Andrea della Robbia's decorations on Brunelleschi's Ospedale degli Innocenti in Florence. The ground floor façade is made of sandstone while the other floors have yellow plaster with window frames of natural stone. The courtyard façades are of whitewashed brick, and the roofs are covered with slate tiles. At the time of acquisition, renovations were carried out, including the conversion of the architectural firm's office into a banquet hall and the construction of a fireplace with the Swedish national coat of arms. Additionally, a connection was established between the main building and the upper part of the house over the courtyard. The purchase of the property was related to the marriage of the Swedish Princess Astrid to the Belgian Crown Prince Leopold. The residence was intended to better reflect "Sweden's elevated status through marriage", and the princess's parents, Prince Carl and Princess Ingeborg, would be able to be housed in a dignified manner. Since then, the property has served as the Swedish ambassador's residence in Brussels.

In 1997, the city of Brussels decided to protect certain parts of the property as cultural heritage. This included the roofs, façades, entrance, hall, staircase, and landing, along with three rooms on the first floor facing the street, as well as the lower gallery at the back. The house is managed by the National Property Board of Sweden, and the tenant is the Ministry for Foreign Affairs.

Avenue Géo Bernier 13

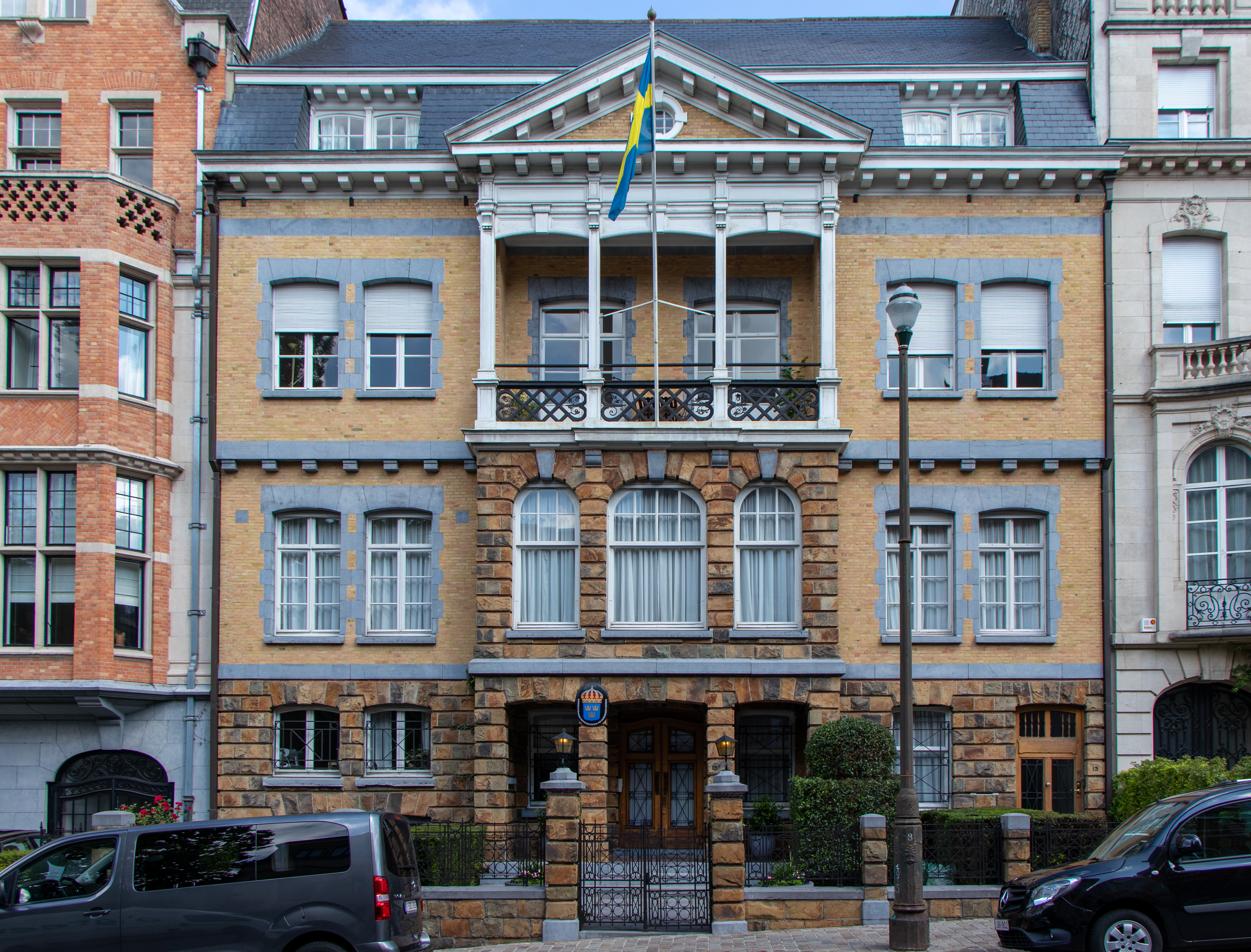
Façade

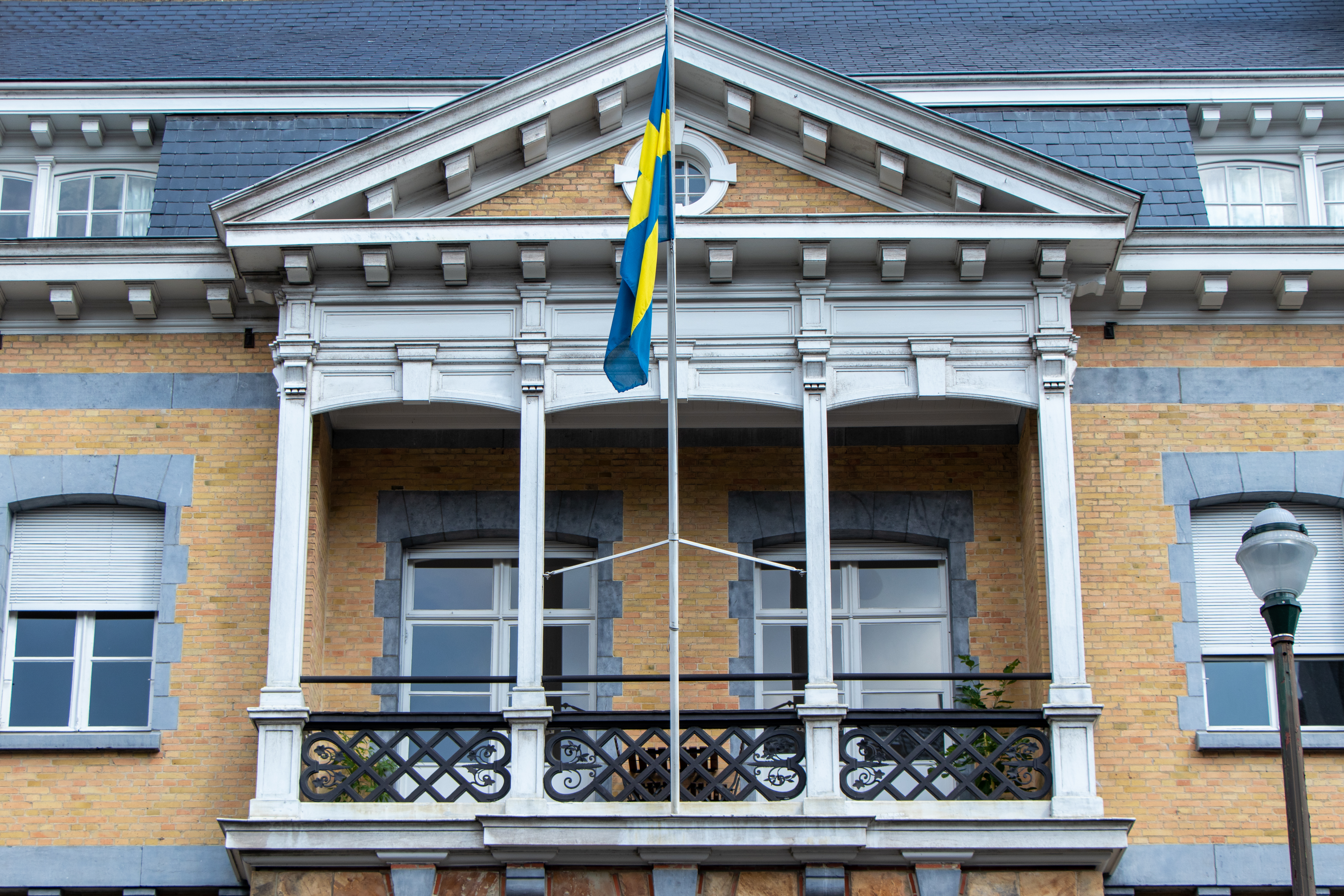
Loggia

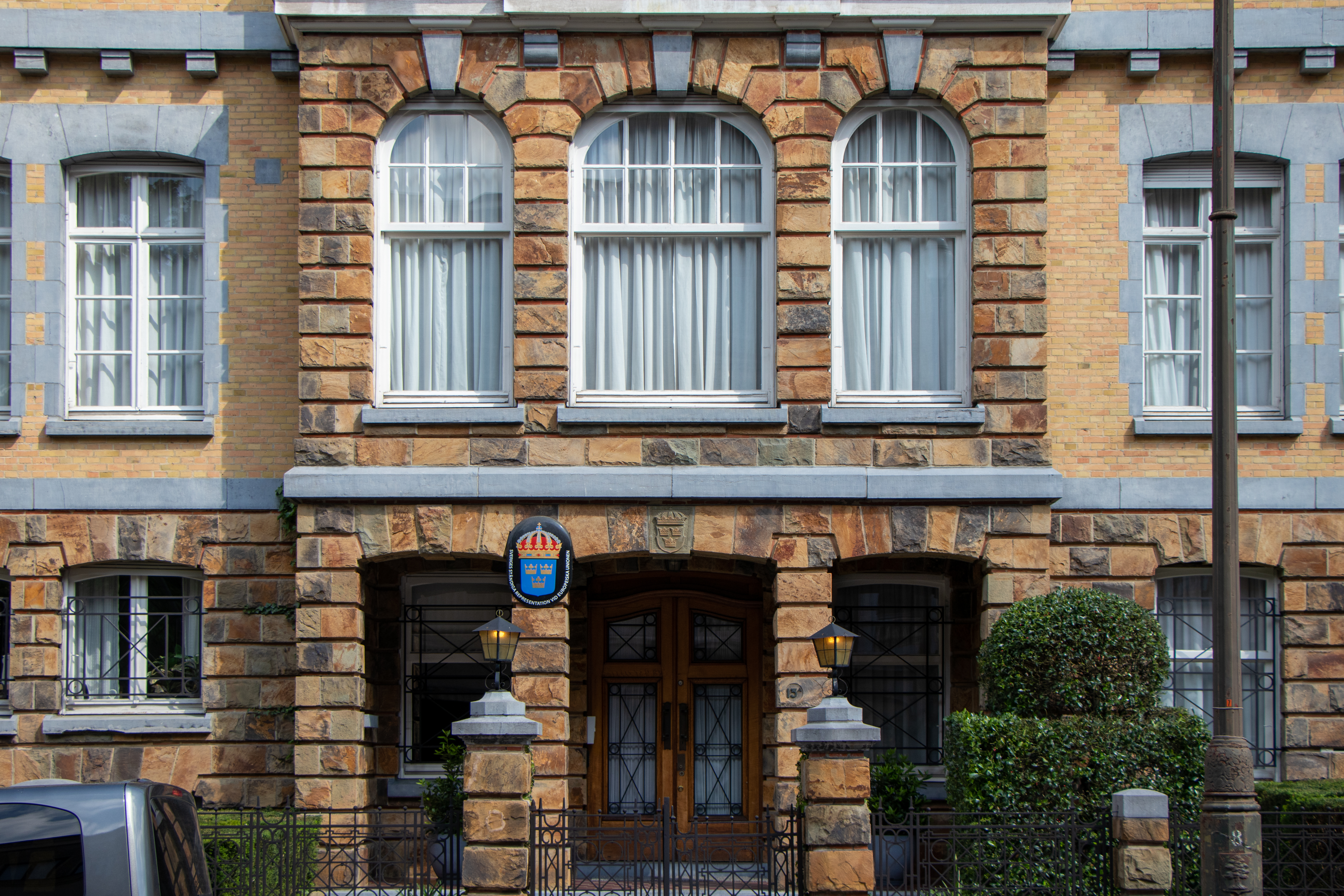
Entrance and lesser coat of arms of Sweden

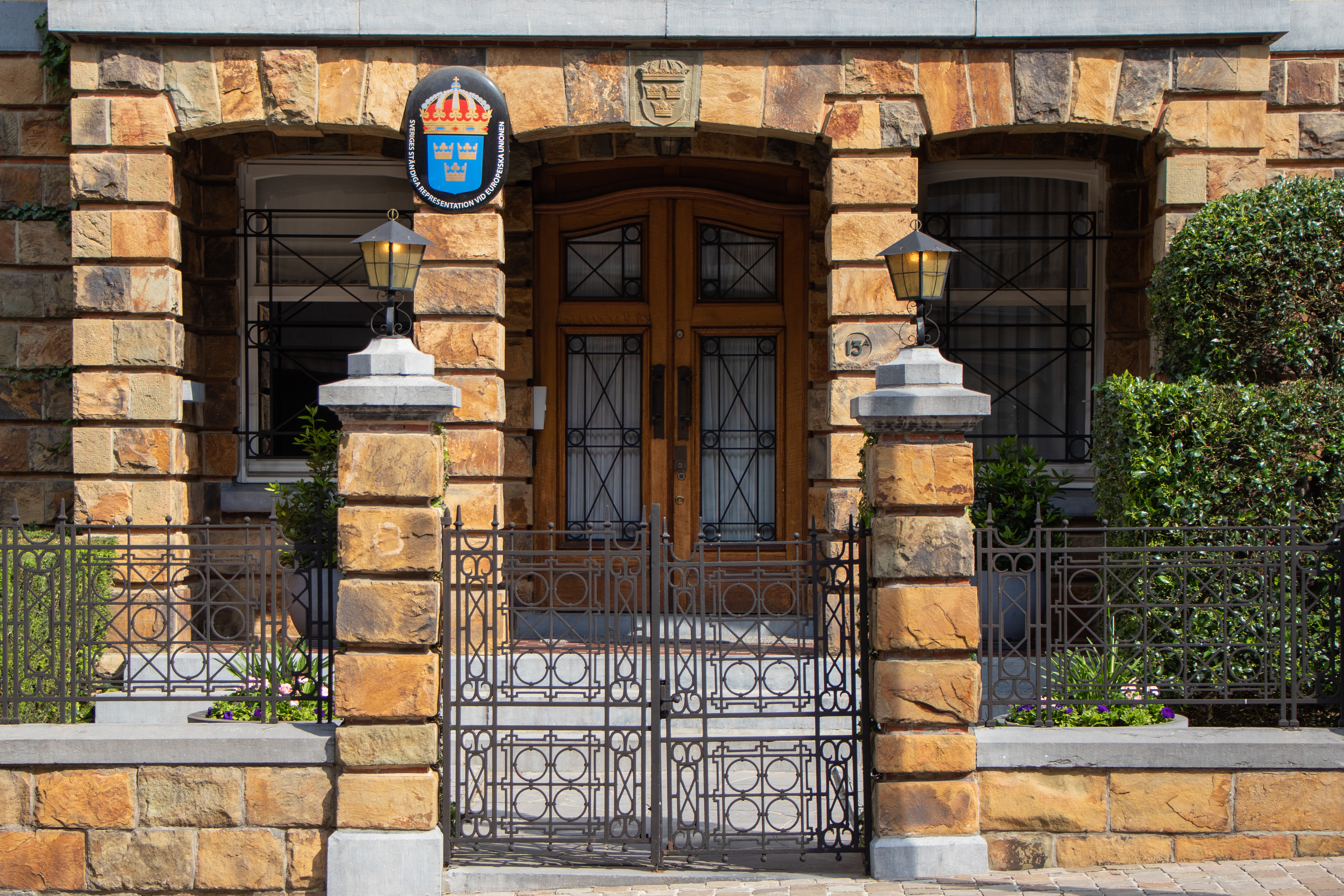
Entrance

== See also ==
- Embassy of Sweden, Brussels
