= Permanent Representative of Sweden to the Council of Europe =

- Lesser coat of arms of the Kingdom of Sweden
- Incumbent; Niklas Kebbon since 2025
- Ministry for Foreign Affairs; Permanent Representation of Sweden to the Council of Europe
- Style: His or Her Excellency (formal); Mr. or Madam Ambassador (informal)
- Member of: Committee of Ministers of the Council of Europe
- Reports to: Minister for Foreign Affairs
- Seat: 67 Allée de la Robertsau; 67000 Strasbourg; France
- Appointer: Government of Sweden
- Term length: No fixed term
- Formation: 6 November 1953
- First holder: Ingemar Hägglöf
- Website: www.swedenabroad.se/en/embassies/strasbourg-council-of-europe/

The Permanent Representative of Sweden to the Council of Europe is the head of the Permanent Representation of Sweden to the Council of Europe in Strasbourg, France. The Council of Europe, founded on 5 May 1949 with the signing of its Statute in London, is an intergovernmental organization dedicated to European cooperation, democracy, human rights, and the rule of law. Sweden was among the early signatories of the Statute.

Initially, Sweden's Permanent Representative to the Council of Europe also held the role of Permanent Representative of Sweden to the Organization for European Economic Cooperation (OEEC) in Paris. However, in 1957, these roles were separated when Karl-Gustav Lagerfelt was appointed solely for the Council of Europe. In 1971, the position became entirely independent.

Today, Sweden's Permanent Representation serves as the primary link between Swedish authorities and the Council of Europe, advocating Swedish policies and safeguarding national interests within the Committee of Ministers—the organization’s highest decision-making body. The Representation, located near the Palace of Europe and the European Court of Human Rights, consists of six staff members, three from the Ministry for Foreign Affairs and three locally employed personnel.

== History ==
On 5 May 1949, the Statute of the Council of Europe was signed at St James's Palace in London. The path to this event went through the Congress of Europe a year earlier. The conference's organizing committee outlined a proposal to establish a Council of Europe, consisting of a Committee of Ministers and a Consultative Assembly. In January 1949, the five states that had previously been part of the Treaty of Brussels—France, the United Kingdom, and the three Benelux countries—endorsed this proposal. A few months later, the Statute of the Council of Europe was signed not only by the Treaty of Brussels states but also by Sweden, among others.

On 6 November 1953, it was decided that the Permanent Representative of Sweden to the Organization for European Economic Cooperation (OEEC) in Paris, Minister Ingemar Hägglöf, would also serve as the country's permanent representative to the Council of Europe. In February 1957, this combined role was revised when Karl-Gustav Lagerfelt was appointed Sweden's permanent representative to the Council of Europe, succeeding Ingemar Hägglöf, who thereafter served solely as head of the OEEC delegation.

Lagerfeldt, in addition to serving as the permanent representative to the Council of Europe, was also accredited as the permanent representative to Sweden's delegation at the High Authority of the European Coal and Steel Community (ECSC), the European Atomic Energy Community (Euratom), and the European Economic Community (EEC). On 1 April 1971, when Arne Fältheim was appointed permanent representative to the Council of Europe, the position became independent. The then-permanent representative, Sven Backlund, continued in his role solely for the ECSC, Euratom, and EEC.

== Tasks ==
The Council of Europe is an intergovernmental organization dedicated to European cooperation, comprising 46 member states and representing over 700 million citizens. Sweden's permanent representation serves as the primary liaison between Swedish authorities and the Council of Europe.

Its main role is to advance Swedish policies and safeguard Sweden’s interests in the Council's key areas: European cooperation on democracy, the promotion of human rights, and the rule of law. The Swedish permanent representative, a diplomat with the rank of ambassador, serves as Sweden's representative in the Committee of Ministers, the Council of Europe's highest decision-making body.

The Swedish representation is situated near the Palace of Europe and the European Court of Human Rights building. It consists of six staff members—three assigned by the inistry for Foreign Affairs and three locally employed personnel.

== List of permanent representatives ==
Name	Period	Title	Notes	Ref
Ingemar Hägglöf	1953–1957	Minister	Also representative to the OEEC.	
Karl-Gustav Lagerfelt	1957–1963	Ambassador	Also representative at the ECSC (from 1956), Euratom (from 1959), and the EEC (from 1959).	
Sten Lindh	1964–1968	Ambassador	Also representative at the ECSC, Euratom, and the EEC.	
Sven Backlund	1968 – 30 March 1971	Ambassador	Also representative at the ECSC, Euratom, and the EEC.	
Arne Fältheim	1 April 1971 – 1976	Ambassador		
Bengt Åkerrén	1976–1980	Ambassador		
Lennart Westerberg	1980–1982	Ambassador		
Bertil Arvidson	1982–1987	Ambassador		
Lennart Myrsten	1987–1989	Ambassador		
Irene Larsson	1989–1993	Ambassador		
Henrik Amnéus	1993–1996	Ambassador		
Håkan Wilkens	1996–2001	Ambassador		
Mats Åberg	2001–2004	Ambassador		
Per Sjögren	2004–2010	Ambassador		
Carl-Henrik Ehrenkrona	2010–2014	Ambassador		
Torbjörn Haak	2014–2019	Ambassador		
Mårten Ehnberg	1 September 2019 – February 2024	Ambassador		
Robert Rydberg	2024–2024	Chargé d'affaires ad interim		
Therese Hydén	November 2024 – 2025	Chargé d'affaires ad interim		
Niklas Kebbon	2025–present	Ambassador		
