= Embassy of Sweden, Berlin =

- Location: Berlin
- Address: Schwedische Botschaft; Nordic Embassies; Rauchstraße 1; 10787 Berlin; Germany
- Coordinates: 52°30′31″N 13°21′02″E
- Opening: 1999 (current embassy)
- Ambassador: Veronika Wand-Danielsson
- Jurisdiction: Germany
- Website: Official website

The Embassy of Sweden in Berlin is Sweden's diplomatic mission in Germany. Sweden established a legation in Berlin in 1912. During World War II, it was destroyed in aerial bombings and the legation was moved to other addresses in Berlin. After the war, the Swedish legation moved to Cologne in West Germany, and in the mid-1950s to Bonn, where it remained until 1999. During the Cold War, Sweden also had an embassy in East Berlin from 1973 onwards. In 1999, the new Swedish embassy in Berlin was inaugurated and the one in Bonn was closed. The chancery has been located since 1999 in the building called the Nordic Embassies, in the Botschaftsviertel neighborhood of the Tiergarten district.

== History ==
=== 1910s–1940s ===
Until the turn of the 20th century, Sweden's foreign representation owned only one building abroad: the Swedish Palace in Constantinople, where the envoy to the Sublime Porte resided. The Swedish legation in Berlin became the fourth to occupy its own premises, after Paris in 1900, Madrid in 1904, and Kristiania (now Oslo) in 1906. In 1912, the legation building in Berlin was purchased by the Swedish state through Consul General Rudolf von Koch for SEK 530,000. The address was Tiergartenstraße 36, at the corner of Friedrich-Wilhelm-Straße (now Klingelhöferstraße). Originally built in 1880, the house was remodeled by architect Fredrik Lilljekvist into a Baroque pastiche, with its façade crowned by the Swedish coat of arms.

By the early 1920s, the legation building had become overcrowded, and lengthy negotiations were held to acquire the neighboring villa, which was much larger. However, the deal fell through, and instead Sweden purchased a 10-meter-wide strip of land from the adjacent plot to prevent the rear of the legation from being obscured if a larger house were built there. The villa was eventually acquired by the Finnish state for use as the republic's legation.

=== World War II ===
Under Hitler's Germany, the Swedish legation building was threatened with demolition because Tiergartenstraße was scheduled to be widened and partly rerouted to make way for a massive new headquarters for the Oberkommando der Wehrmacht. In addition, the house had already become overcrowded. It was therefore decided that the city of Berlin would expropriate two properties—Tiergartenstraße 46–47—and construct a new Swedish legation building on the site to replace the old one. In 1940–41, the Swedish state took possession of these properties, as well as another at Tiergartenstraße 45, intended for future development. While waiting for the war to end, the existing houses were used.

During the bombing of Berlin on 22 November 1943, the Swedish legation was completely destroyed and burned to the ground. Only the newly built bunker in the legation garden survived intact. The legation was then moved to Rauchstraße 25 in Tiergarten, with a postal address in Altdöbern, Kreis Calan. After the bombing, most of the legation staff were evacuated to Alt-Döbern, a castle about 120 km southwest of Berlin that Minister Arvid Richert had rented in August 1943 in anticipation of the Allied bombing campaign. Since the legation premises were now unusable, the legation was permitted to rent a house at Rauchstraße 23 for the Berlin chancery, while most of the administrative work was carried out from Alt-Döbern.

At the beginning of April 1945, the German Foreign Office was evacuated to Bad Gastein, and foreign missions were invited to accompany it. The Swedish legation, however, chose to remain in Berlin in order to protect Swedish lives and property. There were still a relatively large number of Swedish citizens in the city who either could not or did not wish to return to Sweden. In the end of April 1945, during the final phase of the war, Sweden's representation in Germany was divided into two groups: the legation in Berlin, housed in the air-raid shelter at Rauchstraße 25, and the Friedrichsruh group at the castle outside Hamburg. At Rauchstraße 25 in Berlin, seven Swedes were present: First Legation Secretary Hugo Ärnfast, Honorary Attaché Arne Edquist, clerical assistant Baroness E. Ungern-Sternberg, Acting Legation Pastor Erik Myrgren, Legation Physician Dr. Lars Hedwall, ABA representative Helge Klintborn, and DN's Berlin correspondent Ivar Westerlund. At Friedrichsruh were Legation Secretary Torsten Brandel, Attaché Baron Karl-Gustav Lagerfelt, Attaché Axel Lewenhaupt, and Clerk Henrik Carlsson, who had earlier served at the Hamburg mission.

During the final days of the Battle of Berlin, the artillery fire was so intense that the legation staff were effectively trapped in their bunker. On 1 May 1945, the bunker was occupied by about fifteen Soviet soldiers. Despite the Wehrmacht's capitulation on 8 May 1945, the collapse of Nazi Germany, and Sweden's declaration that diplomatic relations had been severed, the legation continued to function even after the arrival of the Soviets. On 18 May, however, the legation staff were evacuated via Moscow and Leningrad to Stockholm.

=== Cold War ===
==== Berlin ====
The management of the Swedish properties in Berlin was taken over by the British occupying authorities, who administered them until 1948, when they were returned to Sweden. Of the four buildings, the legation house at Tiergartenstraße 36 was the best preserved, with its outer walls still standing. The other houses had been almost completely destroyed in the bombing of November 1943 and were reduced to rubble, which was cleared away in 1952. In preparation for the Interbau exhibition in Berlin in 1957, the city expressed concern that the old diplomatic quarter should be rebuilt, and as early as 1953 there were plans to reconstruct the Swedish legation house using its preserved outer walls. However, this never materialized, and the ruins were demolished in 1956.

In March 1956, an agreement was reached between the Swedish government and the government of the Federal Republic of Germany to elevate the legations of both countries to embassies. In connection with this, the Swedish government appointed Ole Jödahl—then newly named envoy in Bonn—as Sweden's ambassador.

In 1964, the Swedish state purchased a house, built in 1940, at Pücklerstraße 42–44 in the Dahlem district for use as the ambassador's residence. In its garden, secret East–West talks were held in 1966 between Berlin Mayor Willy Brandt and Soviet Ambassador Pyotr Abrassimov. Mediated by Consul General Sven Backlund, these talks marked the first steps toward Brandt's famous Ostpolitik. The villa itself had been built in the Heimatschutz style by architect Wilhelm von Gumbertz, while the protected garden and circular pool were designed by landscape architect Herta Hammerbacher.

In 1970, the Swedish National Board of Public Building (Byggnadsstyrelsen) financed a general renovation of the legation plots and the former air-raid shelter. Following the establishment of West Germany in September 1949 by the Western Allied powers, the Soviet Union responded in October by transforming its occupation zone into a separate state—East Germany. Sweden established diplomatic relations with West Germany and opened a mission in the provisional capital, Bonn. Since Sweden did not recognize the division of Germany or the existence of East Germany, the legation site in Berlin was retained in anticipation of eventual reunification and the city's restoration as the capital.

However, after the two German states recognized each other in 1972, Sweden followed by recognizing East Germany and establishing an embassy in East Berlin. By the mid-1970s, the Swedish embassy in East Berlin was located at Otto-Grotewohl-Straße 3 A.

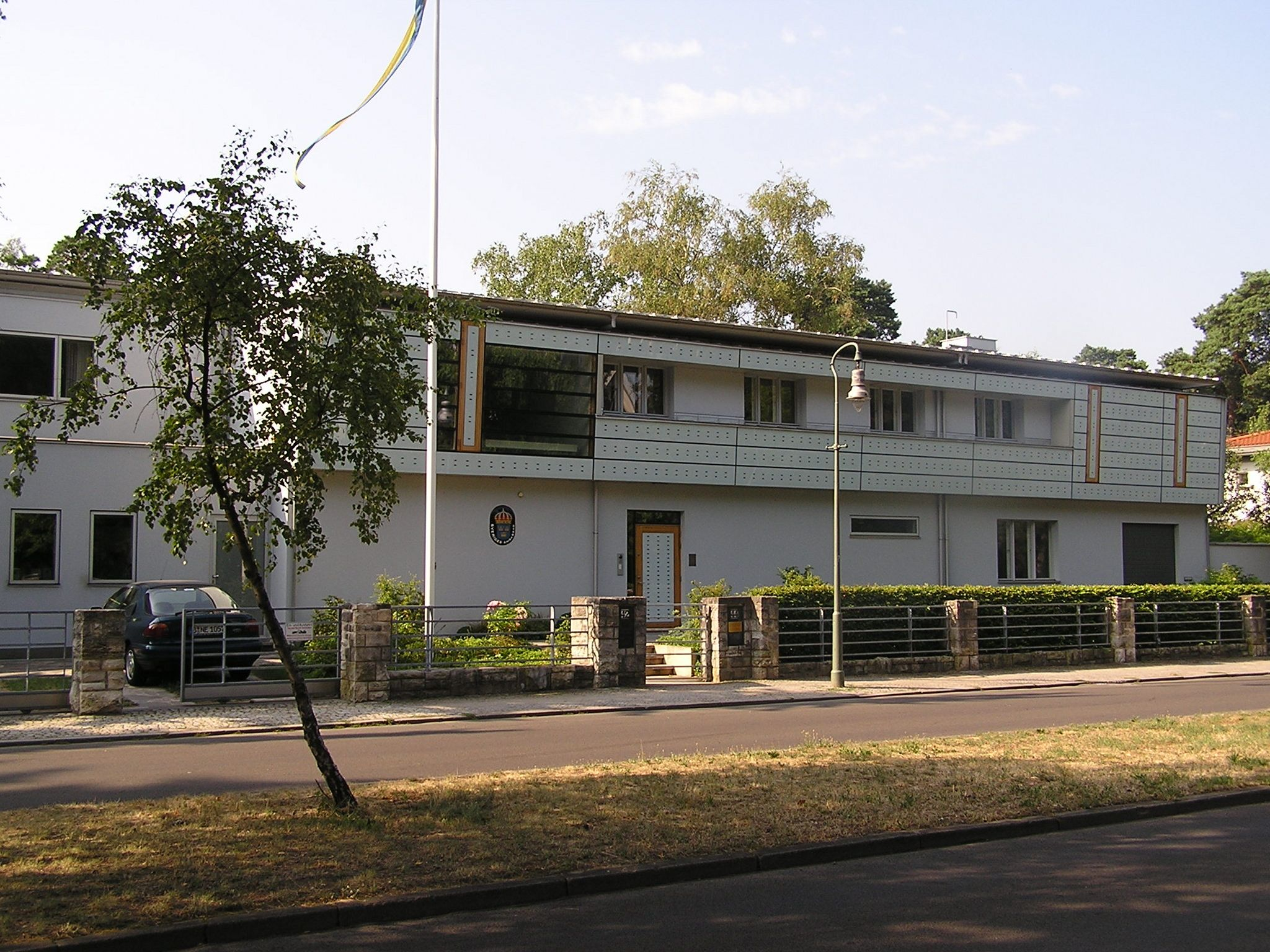
Swedish residence at Pücklerstraße 42–44 in Dahlem.

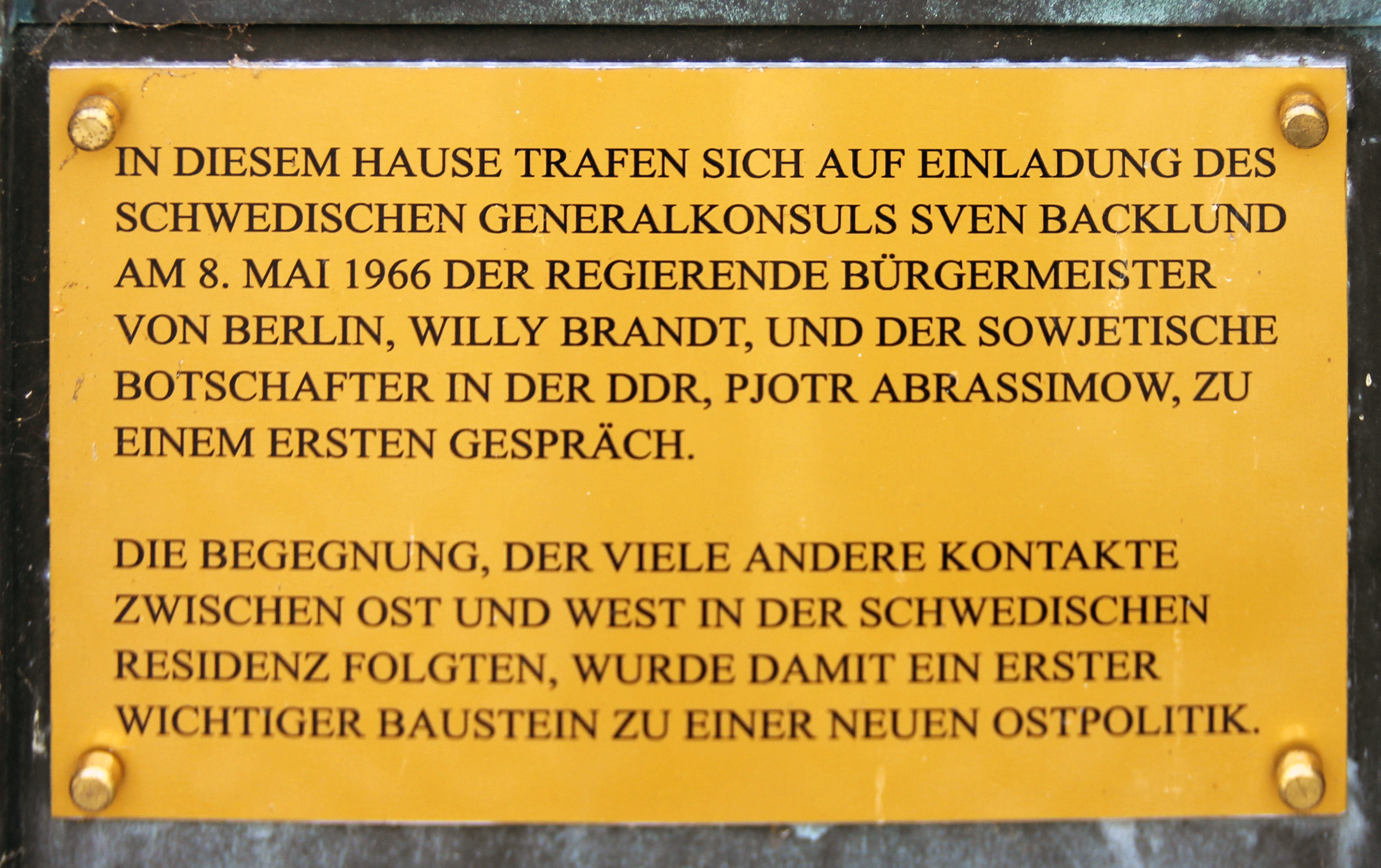
Memorial plaque of the Ostpolitik at the Swedish residence in 1966.

==== Cologne/Bonn ====
After the war, the Swedish embassy moved to a rented villa at Ulmenallée 96 (Note: Renamed Unter den Ulmen 96 in 1979/1980.) in Bayenthal, Cologne, and Sweden was thereafter represented in Germany by a diplomatic envoy accredited to the Allied High Commission. The villa had 18 rooms, comprising a basement with a kitchen area and caretaker's quarters, two residential floors, and a partially furnished attic. It served as the chancery from December 1949 at the latest, when accreditation was first granted. The ambassador's residence was located at Ulmenallée 152.

In 1951, the villa at Ulmenallee 96 was purchased by the Swedish state for DM 115,000 (SEK 140,000). By 1954, the chancery was still housed there, while the Trade Department operated from Gerhard von Arestraße 1 in Bonn. In 1956, the Swedish legation was upgraded to an embassy, based at this location with its consular section until 1957. That year, the embassy moved to Koblenzer Straße 91 in Bonn, and the villa at Ulmenallee 96 was sold.

In the mid-1960s, the chancery remained at Koblenzer Straße 91 in Bonn, while the ambassador's residence was located at Friedrich-Schmidt-Straße 60 in Cologne. By 1968, the embassy had relocated to Allianzplatz Haus I, at An der Heussallee 2–10 in Bonn, in an area known as Tulpenfeld. At the same time, the residence was moved to Dietkirchener Hof (also called Alter Fronhof) in Urfeld, a district of Wesseling, where it took over the former residence of the Dutch ambassador. The residence remained there until 7 June 1999.

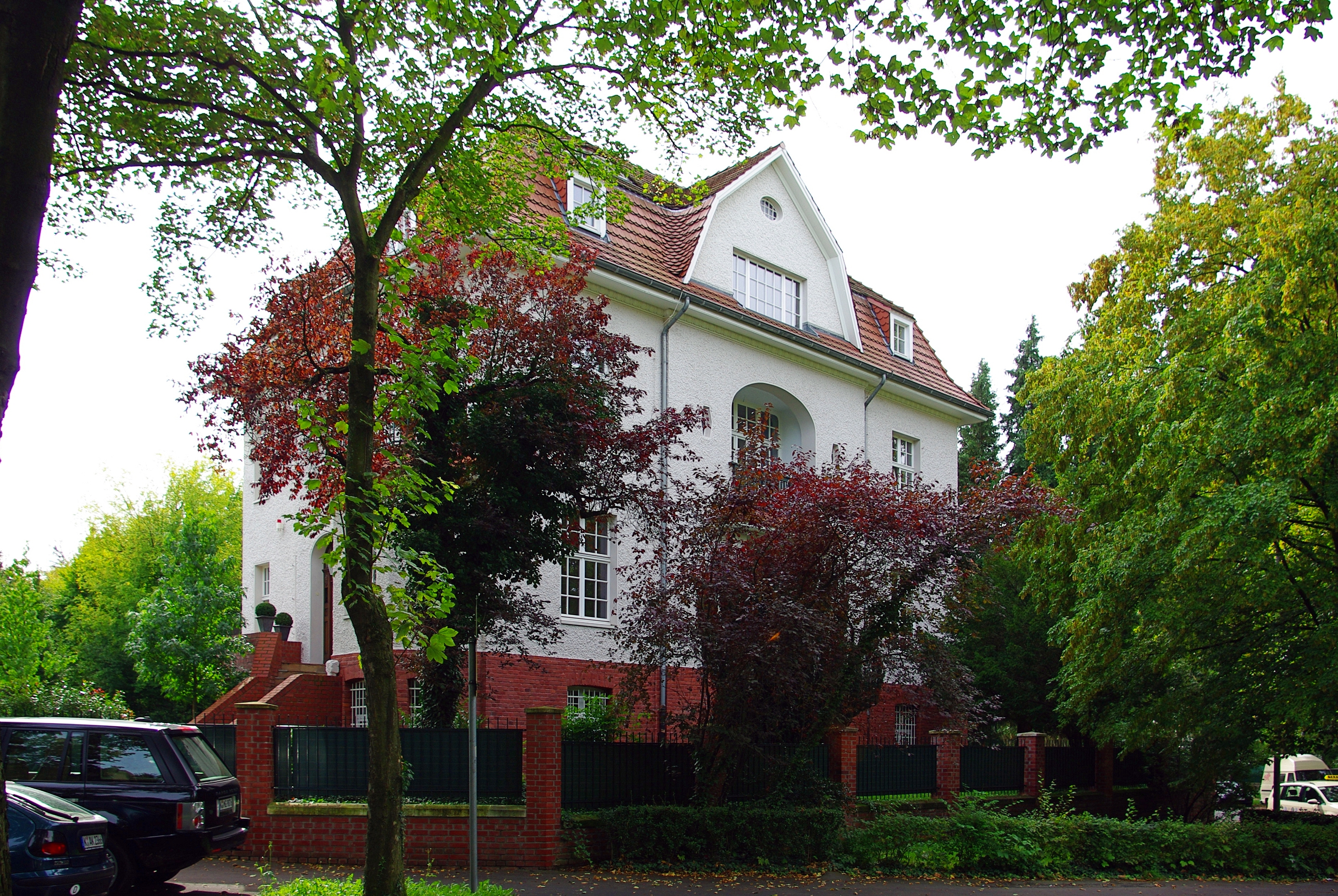
Ulmenallée 96 in Cologne.

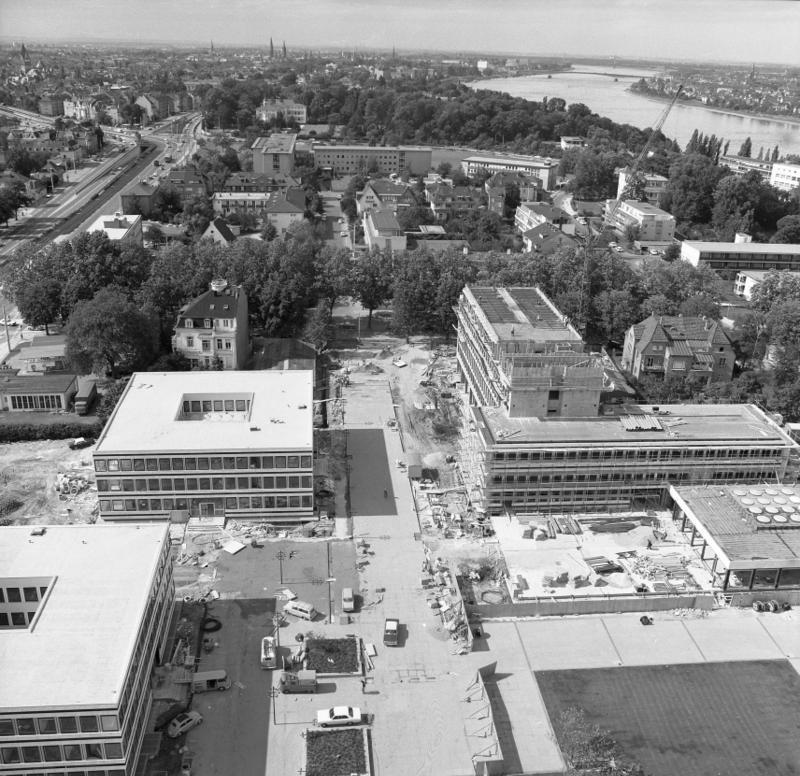
Construction of Tulpenfeld in August 1967. The Swedish embassy in the middle left of the picture.

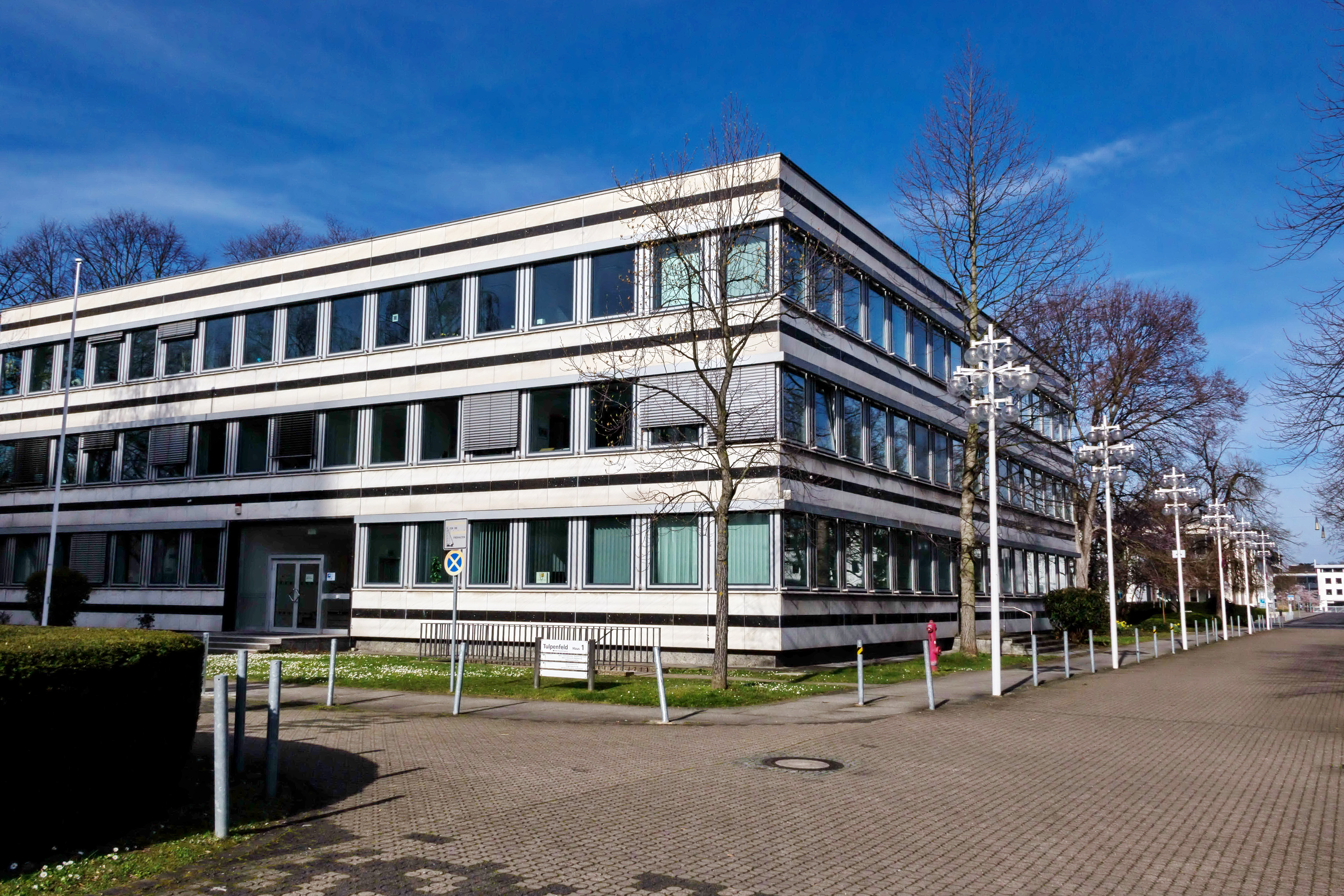
Tulpenfeld 1 (also called Allianzplatz Haus I) in Bonn.

=== Post-Cold War ===
By the 1970s, it no longer seemed likely that the old plots in West Berlin would be used again for Swedish diplomatic representation. Sweden therefore sold the four legation properties to the city of Berlin in 1974. After the reunification of Germany, plans emerged for a new government district in the capital. Along the Spree, the idea of concentrating foreign embassies around Tiergartenstraße was revived, and both the city of Berlin and the Federal Republic welcomed the prospect of Sweden and Finland returning to their former sites. Sweden subsequently entered into negotiations with the city of Berlin, and in June 1995 the Swedish state regained possession of Tiergartenstraße 36.

In September 1999, the Nordic Embassies complex was inaugurated, bringing together the embassies of Sweden, Norway, Denmark, Finland, and Iceland. Its located in the Botschaftsviertel neighborhood of the Tiergarten district. The shared building and grounds are jointly owned by the Nordic countries, while each embassy building is owned individually by the respective state. The Austrian architects Alfred Berger and Tiina Parkkinen won an international architectural competition for the development of the site with a proposal that linked the embassy buildings together by a striking copper "band" encircling two sides of the triangular block. Other common design principles included four storeys for each building, flat roofs, and façade orientations that carried through from one embassy to the next. In total, five developers, seven architectural firms, and thirty-five contractors collaborated on the cohesive project. Following a separate competition, architect Gert Wingårdh and his firm, Wingårdh arkitektkontor, were commissioned to design the Swedish embassy.

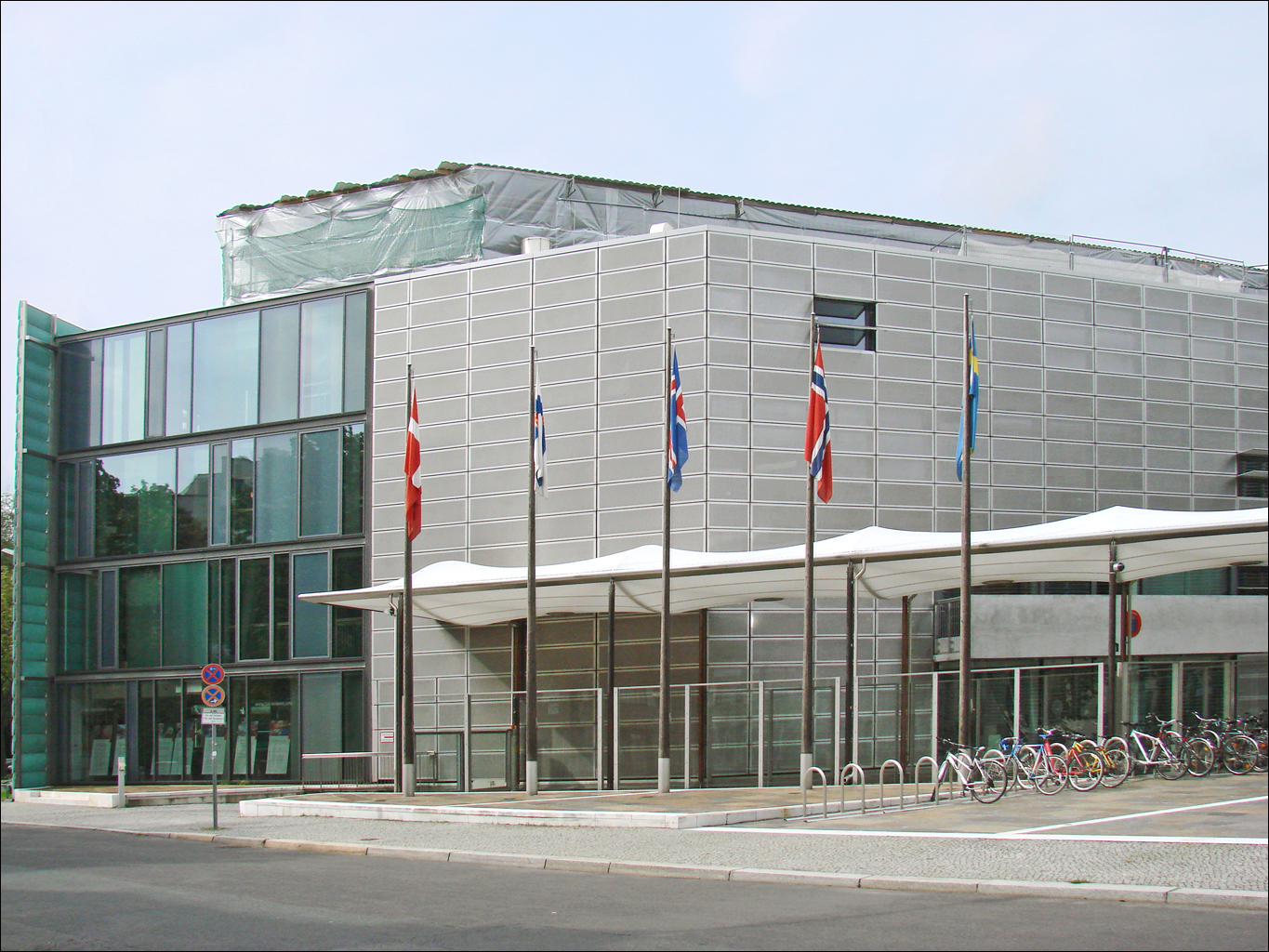
Exterior

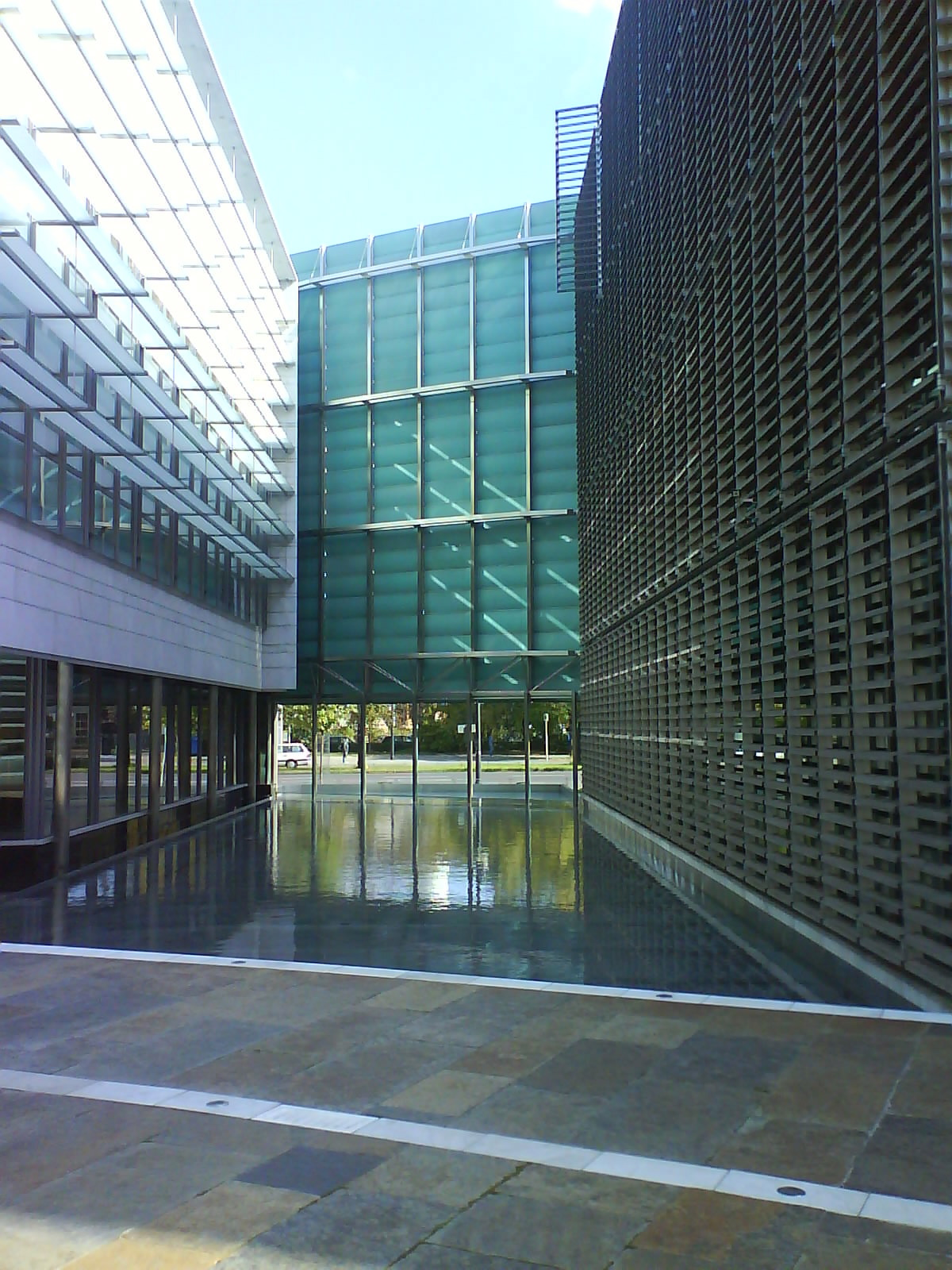
Exterior

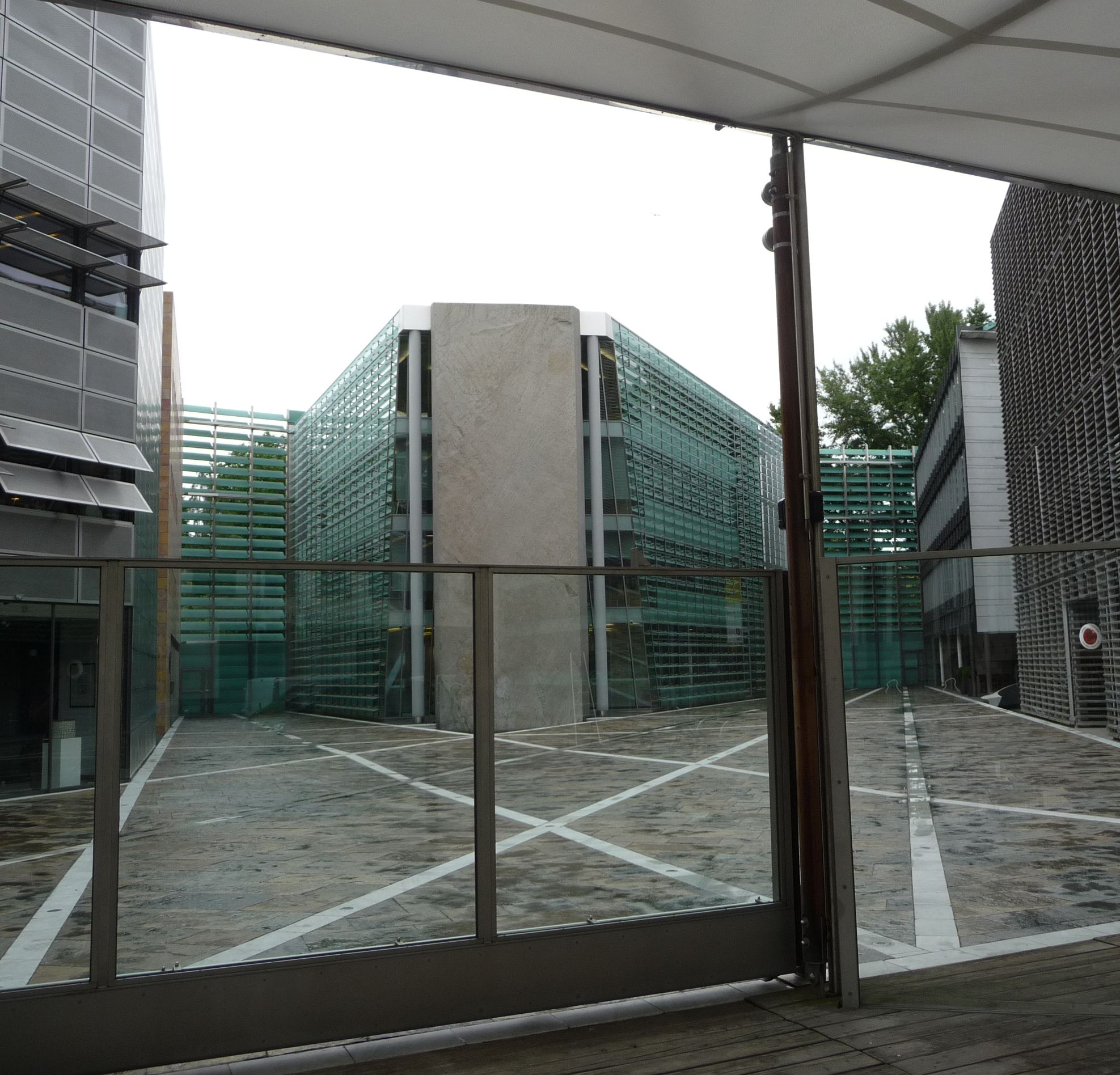
Exterior

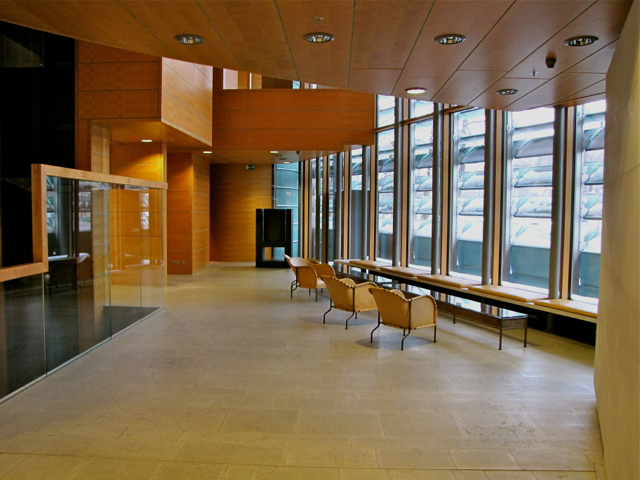
Foyer

== Staff and tasks ==
=== Staff ===
At the Swedish Embassy in Berlin, there are 35 staff members, including eight diplomats from the Ministry for Foreign Affairs, two from the Swedish Armed Forces, and one from the Swedish Customs Service. The remaining 24 employees are locally hired.

=== Tasks ===
In December 2023, the embassy was organized into several key departments:

- Ambassador's Office: Manages the ambassador's activities and administrative support.
- Political and Economic Unit: Handles political and economic affairs, with roles including a Minister Counsellor, several Counsellors, and a First Secretary. This unit also includes an administrative assistant.
- Communication, Business, and Culture Unit: Focuses on communication, business relations, and cultural affairs. The team includes a Counsellor for Communication, Business, and Culture, a Cultural Counsellor, and a First Secretary, along with an administrative assistant.
- Administrative and Consular Unit: Oversees administrative and consular services, including a Counsellor and Head of Administration, a First Secretary and Deputy Head of Administration, and support staff.
- Defence Unit: Responsible for defence-related matters, including a Defence Attaché, a Deputy Defence Attaché, and a Defence Officer.
- Customs Liaison: Manages customs-related issues with a Customs Liaison Officer and a Customs Officer.

== See also ==
- Germany–Sweden relations
