= Sven Backlund =

Swedish diplomat and writer (1917–1997)

Ambassador of Sweden to West Germany
- In office 1972–1983
- Preceded by: Nils Montan
- Succeeded by: Lennart Eckerberg

Permanent Representative of Sweden to the ECSC, Euratom, and the EEC
- In office 1968–1972
- Preceded by: Sten Lindh
- Succeeded by: Erik von Sydow

Permanent Representative of Sweden to the Council of Europe
- In office 1968–1971
- Preceded by: Sten Lindh
- Succeeded by: Arne Fältheim

Consul general of Sweden in Berlin
- In office 1964–1967
- Preceded by: Östen Lundborg
- Succeeded by: Åke Sjölin

Ambassador of Sweden to Yugoslavia
- In office 1961–1963
- Preceded by: Stig Unger
- Succeeded by: Agda Rössel

Personal details
- Born: Sven Einar Backlund; 31 May 1917 Stockholm, Sweden
- Died: 20 September 1997 (aged 80) Staffanstorp, Sweden
- Education: Stockholm University College

Sven Einar Backlund (31 May 1917 – 20 September 1997) was a Swedish diplomat. He was the ambassador of Sweden to Yugoslavia, European Economic Community and West Germany. He also served as the Permanent Representative of Sweden to the Council of Europe.

== Early life and education ==
Backlund was born on 31 May 1917 in Stockholm, Sweden, the son of Sven Backlund, an editor, and his wife Herta (née Bergström). His father was a social democratic figure and worked for the Gothenburg-based news magazine Ny Tid as a foreign editor in the 1940s.

Backlund obtained his university degree in 1936. He founded the Social Democratic student club at Stockholm University College. He received a master's degree in politics in 1942.

== Career and activities ==
Following his graduation Backlund joined the Ministry of Foreign Affairs in 1942. He worked as an attaché at the Swedish embassies in the USA until 1946 and in the United Kingdom between 1946 and 1947. He was the secretary of legation in Norway from 1947 to 1949 and in the US from 1951 to 1955. Backlund was named as the head of the press office of the Ministry of Foreign Affairs in 1955 and remained in office until 1961. He served as the councilor of mission in Belgrade between 1961 and 1964, becoming ambassador to Yugoslavia in 1963. He was the consul general in Berlin from 1964 to 1968. Backlund mediated secret meetings between Willy Brandt, then Mayor of West Berlin, and Pyotr Abrasimov, ambassador of Soviet Union to East Germany, which were held at the Swedish Embassy in Berlin in November 1966.

Backlund was appointed Permanent Representative of Sweden to the ECSC, Euratom, and the EEC in 1968 which he held until 1972. During his tenure he was also Permanent Representative of Sweden to the Council of Europe. Backlund was appointed ambassador of Sweden to West Germany in 1972 and remained in office until June 1983. Throughout his diplomatic tenure in West Germany Backlund was one of the people who helped East Germans to flee. His term witnessed a crisis between Sweden and West Germany when his secret report to the Swedish Ministry of Foreign Affairs was leaked to the Swedish press in June 1975. In the report Backlund argued that if Franz Josef Strauss, head of the Christian Social Union in Bavaria, would become prime minister, then the relations between two countries would be problematic.

== Later years and legacy ==
Backlund worked as a writer after his retirement from diplomatic post.

German politician Willy Brandt described Backlund as a rare ambassador "who knew the Federal Republic of Germany better than many German politicians."

== Personal life ==
Backlund was married to Kristina Molander, the daughter of master tailor E Molander and Ester Näsholm. They had two children: Karin (born 1946) and Sven (born 1947).

He died in 1997.

Diplomatic posts
Preceded by Stig Unger	Ambassador of Sweden to Yugoslavia; 1961–1963	Succeeded by Agda Rössel
Preceded by Östen Lundborg	Consul general of Sweden in Berlin; 1964–1967	Succeeded by Åke Sjölin
Preceded by Sten Lindh	Permanent Representative of Sweden to the Council of Europe; 1968–1971	Succeeded by Arne Fältheim
Preceded by Sten Lindh	Permanent Representative of Sweden to the ECSC, Euratom, and the EEC; 1968–1972	Succeeded by Erik von Sydow
Preceded by Nils Montan	Ambassador of Sweden to West Germany; 1972–1983	Succeeded by Lennart Eckerberg
