= Erik von Sydow =

Swedish diplomat (1923–2001)

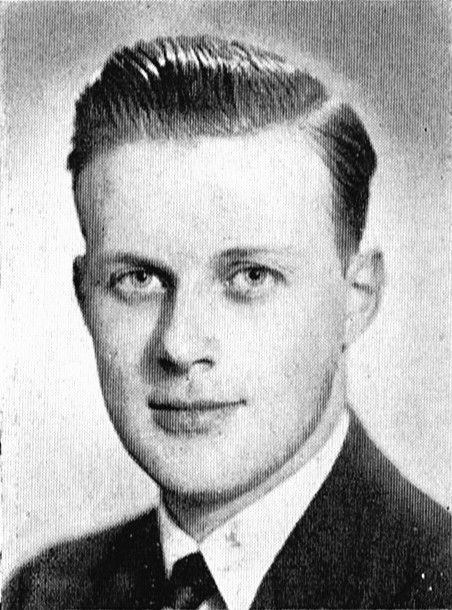
- von Sydow as a student in the 1930s
- Born: 2 September 1912; Gothenburg, Sweden
- Died: 5 December 1997 (aged 85); Stockholm, Sweden
- Resting place: Galärvarvskyrkogården
- Education: Uppsala University
- Occupation: Diplomat
- Years active: 1936–1978
- Spouse: Lia Akel (m. 1940)
- Children: 2
- Father: Oscar von Sydow
- Relatives: Friedrich Akel (father-in-law)

Erik von Sydow (2 September 1912 – 5 December 1997) was a Swedish diplomat who began his career after earning a law degree from Uppsala University in 1935. He joined the Ministry for Foreign Affairs in 1936, serving in Berlin, Riga, and Tallinn, where he handled political and trade matters and consular duties.

He later served in Tokyo as second and then first secretary, becoming chargé d’affaires ad interim in 1945, before being evacuated in 1946. Post-war, he held senior positions including trade counsellor in Paris and Washington, D.C., director-general for trade policy, and head of the Ministry’s Trade Department. He chaired trade negotiations with multiple countries and represented Sweden at international conferences.

Von Sydow served as Ambassador and Permanent Delegate to the International Organizations in Geneva and EFTA (1964–1971) and as Ambassador and Permanent Representative to the European Communities in Brussels (1972–1978). After retiring, he chaired the Sweden–EEC Joint Committee and led the Friends of the Museum of Far Eastern Antiquities (1978–1985).

== Early life ==
von Sydow was born on 2 September 1912 in Gothenburg, Sweden, the son of the Marshal of the Realm and former Prime Minister Oscar von Sydow and his wife Mary Wijk. Erik had two siblings — the shipowner and business executive Kristian von Sydow (1917–2008) and Marie Andréen (1919–2008). His uncle was the banker Ernst von Sydow. The journalist Ebba von Sydow is Erik's great-niece. On his mother’s side, Erik Wijk was his maternal grandfather, and Olof Wijk the Elder was his great-grandfather.

On 29 May 1935, von Sydow earned a Candidate of Law degree from Uppsala University.

== Career ==
von Sydow became an attaché at the Ministry for Foreign Affairs in 1936 and was posted to Berlin in 1937. In February 1938, he was assigned to the Swedish legation in Riga for his second foreign posting. In Latvia, he dealt partly with trade matters alongside political reporting. Unlike Tallinn, Riga had a small Swedish community, as Swedish companies were involved in projects such as the construction of a power station. In the summer of 1938, von Sydow was to serve temporarily at the consulate in Tallinn, replacing Baron Anders Koskull, who had held the post since 1930. During a vacation in Sweden, Koskull died, and von Sydow consequently remained in Tallinn for seven months. He formally became head of mission, although consular matters in Estonia mainly concerned assisting Swedish tourists in need of help.

He was appointed second secretary at the Swedish legation in Tokyo in 1940 and first secretary in 1944. In April 1945, when Envoy Widar Bagge left Tokyo, von Sydow took charge of the legation as chargé d’affaires ad interim. In February 1946, von Sydow was evacuated from Tokyo along with diplomats of about ten different nationalities aboard the American ship Uruguay, which departed on 15 February.

He later served as acting head of division at the Ministry for Foreign Affairs from 1947 to 1949, trade counsellor and Permanent Representative of Sweden to the Organisation for European Economic Co-operation (OEEC) in Paris from 1949 to 1953, and trade counsellor in Washington, D.C. from 1954 to 1956. From 1959 to 1963, he was director-general for trade policy (utrikesråd) and head of the Ministry's Trade Department (deputy head from 1956).

During the same period, von Sydow was a member of the National Export Credits Guarantee Board (1959–1963). He chaired trade negotiations with the United Kingdom, the Soviet Union, Benelux, Poland, and several other countries, and led Swedish delegations at various international conferences. He then served as Ambassador and Permanent Delegate of Sweden to the International Organizations in Geneva and to the European Free Trade Association (EFTA) from 1964 to 1971, and later as Ambassador and Permanent Representative of Sweden to the European Communities in Brussels from 1972 to 1978.

After his diplomatic career, von Sydow was chairman of the Sweden–EEC Joint Committee and president of the Friends of the Museum of Far Eastern Antiquities (Östasiatiska Museets Vänner) from 1978 to 1985.

== Personal life ==
On 20 January 1940 in Tallinn, Estonia, von Sydow married Lia Akel (1918–2009), the daughter of Estonia's Minister of Foreign Affairs and State Elder Friedrich Akel and Adéle Tenz. They had two children: Douglas (born 1947) and Liane (born 1949).

After the Soviet occupation in 1940, Lia lost her entire family: her father disappeared without a trace, her mother was deported to Siberia and died there, a brother and a brother-in-law perished in prison, and a sister spent 17 years in Siberia, separated from her two young children.

Estonia played an important role in von Sydow's life, especially through his marriage to Lia Akel, the daughter of one of Estonia’s most prominent figures of the 20th century. Since 1990, a group of volunteers in Uppsala had been running an ongoing aid project focused on Tartu. von Sydow took part in this work, which resulted in new shower and toilet facilities, washing machines, and transport of bedding and other equipment to the Psychiatric Clinic and the Nursing Home in Tartu, as well as to the health center in Rõngu. Quietly and without publicity, he also contributed to many other projects and provided help to individuals in need.

von Sydow resided in Villa Hasselbacken at Hazeliusbacken 18 on Djurgården in Stockholm.

== Death ==
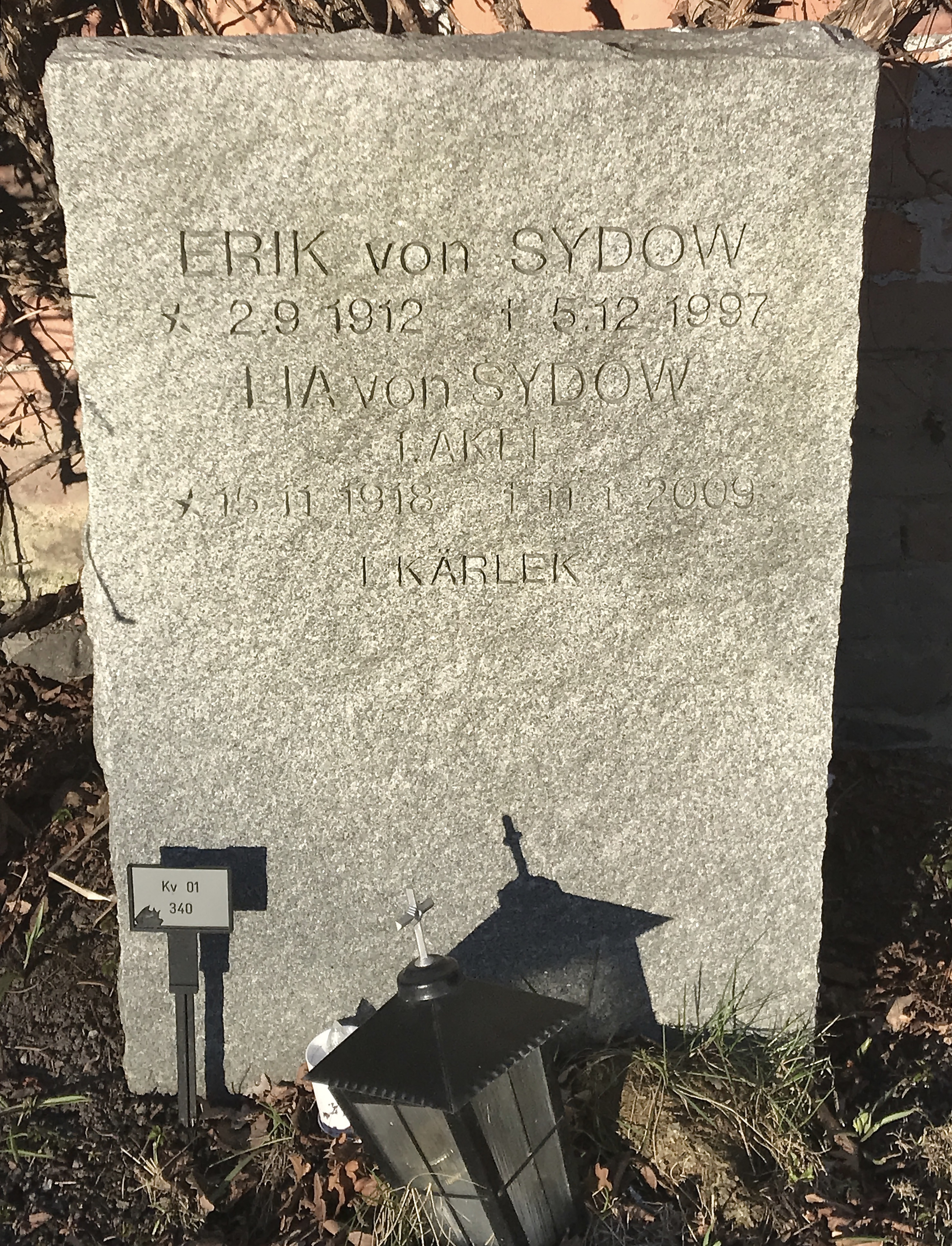
Gravestone at Galärvarvskyrkogården.

von Sydow died on 5 December 1997 in Stockholm. The funeral was held on 30 December 1997 at Saint James's Church. He was interred on 11 May 1998 at Galärvarvskyrkogården in Stockholm.

== Awards and decorations ==
- (Sweden) Commander 1st Class of the Order of the Polar Star (16 November 1970)
- (Sweden) Knight of the Order of the Polar Star (23 November 1961)
- (Norway) Commander of the Order of St. Olav with Star (1959)
- Grand Officer of the Decoration of Honour for Services to the Republic of Austria
- (Netherlands) Grand Officer of the Order of Orange-Nassau (18 May 1957)
- (Argentina) Commander of the Order of Merit
- (Belgium) Commander of the Order of Leopold
- (Greece) Grand Officer of the Order of George I
- (Japan) Commander of the Order of the Sacred Treasure
- (Denmark) Knight of the Order of the Dannebrog
- (France) Officer of the Legion of Honour
- Knight of the 1st Class of the Order of the White Rose of Finland
- (Estonia) Knight of the Order of the White Star
- (Latvia) Knight of the Order of the Three Stars

Diplomatic posts
Preceded by Widar Bagge as Envoy	Chargé d'affaires ad interim of Sweden to Japan; 1945–1946	Succeeded by Leif Öhrvall as Diplomatic representative
Preceded by None	Permanent Representative of Sweden to the OEEC; 1949–1953	Succeeded by Ingemar Hägglöf
Preceded by Carl Henrik von Platen	Permanent Delegate of Sweden to the International Organizations in Geneva; 1964–1972	Succeeded by Karl-Gustav Lagerfelt
Preceded by Sven Backlund	Permanent Representative of Sweden to the European Communities; 1972–1978	Succeeded by Bengt Rabaeus
