= Permanent Representative of Sweden to the Organisation for Economic Co-operation and Development =

Permanent Representative of Sweden to the OECD
- Lesser coat of arms of the Kingdom of Sweden
- Incumbent; Helena Sångeland since 24 August 2023
- Ministry for Foreign Affairs; Delegation of Sweden to the OECD
- Style: His or Her Excellency (formal); Mr. or Madam Ambassador (informal)
- Reports to: Minister for Foreign Affairs
- Seat: Embassy of Sweden, Paris; 17 rue Barbet-de-Jouy, 75007 Paris, France
- Appointer: Government of Sweden
- Term length: No fixed term
- Formation: 1949
- First holder: Erik von Sydow
- Website: www.swedenabroad.se/en/embassies/oecd-unesco/

The Permanent Representative of Sweden to the OECD heads the Delegation of Sweden to the Organisation for Economic Co-operation and Development (OECD) in Paris, France. The permanent representative, a diplomat with the rank of ambassador, also serves as the Permanent Delegate of Sweden to UNESCO and heads the Delegation of Sweden to UNESCO, also located in Paris.

== History ==
In 1948, 18 European countries, including Sweden, formed the Organization for European Economic Cooperation (OEEC) to administer the Marshall Plan. On 22 April 1949, during a council meeting, First Secretary Erik von Sydow was appointed as an additional trade counselor at the Swedish legation in Paris, assigned to Sweden's delegation to the OEEC. This made him the first head of the Swedish delegation.

In 1953, the head of the delegation was granted the title of minister with the appointment of Ingemar Hägglöf. On 6 November 1953, it was decided that the head of Sweden's OEEC delegation in Paris would also serve as the country's permanent representative to the Council of Europe. In February 1957, this combined role was revised when Karl-Gustav Lagerfelt was appointed as Sweden's permanent representative to the Council of Europe, succeeding Ingemar Hägglöf, who from then on served solely as the head of the OEEC delegation. From June of that year, the head of the delegation held the title of ambassador instead of minister. On 30 September 1961, the OECD officially replaced the OEEC.

Since 1965, Sweden's Permanent Representative to the OECD has also served as the country's Permanent Delegate to UNESCO in Paris.

== Tasks ==
=== OECD ===
The Swedish permanent representative, a diplomat with the rank of ambassador, heads the Swedish delegation and represents Sweden in the OECD Council, which is the highest decision-making body. The Swedish delegation's mission is to represent Sweden in the OECD and its affiliated organizations, including the International Energy Agency (IEA), the Nuclear Energy Agency (NEA), and the International Transport Forum (ITF). It advocates for Swedish interests and provides reports on the organization's activities in areas relevant to Sweden. Key priorities include economic analysis, trade, energy, development issues, and gender equality.

=== UNESCO ===
The Swedish permanent representative to the OECD also serves as the Swedish permanent delegate to UNESCO. The ambassador heads the Swedish delegation which represents Sweden in UNESCO, advocating for Swedish priorities such as human rights, education, freedom of speech, and journalist safety. Its work includes attending meetings, negotiating, and collaborating with the EU and Nordic delegations. The team, comprising diplomats and local staff, works closely with the Swedish government, Swedish International Development Cooperation Agency (SIDA), and the Swedish National Commission for UNESCO (Svenska Unescorådet).

== List of permanent representatives ==
No.	Portrait	Ambassador (Note: The head held the title of commercial counselor from 1949 to 1953, the title of minister from 1953 to 1957, and the title of ambassador since 1957.)	Took office	Left office	Time in office	OECD Secretary-General	Ref.
Organisation for European Economic Co-operation (OEEC)
1	Erik von Sydow	Erik von Sydow (1912–1997)	1949	1953	3–4 years	Robert Marjolin	
2	Ingemar Hägglöf	Ingemar Hägglöf (1912–1995)	1953	30 September 1961	7–8 years	Robert Marjolin; René Sergent; Thorkil Kristensen	
Organisation for Economic Co-operation and Development (OECD)
2	Ingemar Hägglöf	Ingemar Hägglöf (1912–1995)	30 September 1961	1963	1–2 years	Thorkil Kristensen	
3	Carl Henrik von Platen	Carl Henrik von Platen (1913–1995)	1964	1972	7–8 years	Thorkil Kristensen; Emiel van Lennep	
4	Leif Belfrage	Leif Belfrage (1910–1990)	1972	1976	3–4 years	Emiel van Lennep	
5	Hans Colliander	Hans Colliander (1924–2013)	1976	1985	8–9 years	Emiel van Lennep; Jean-Claude Paye	
6	Bo Kjellén	Bo Kjellén (1933–2024)	1985	1991	5–6 years	Jean-Claude Paye	
7	Staffan Sohlman	Staffan Sohlman (1937–2017)	1991	1995	3–4 years	Jean-Claude Paye	
8	Anders Ferm	Anders Ferm (1938–2019)	1995	2003	7–8 years	Jean-Claude Paye; Don Johnston	
9	Gun-Britt Andersson	Gun-Britt Andersson (born 1942)	2003	2007	3–4 years	Don Johnston; José Ángel Gurría	
10	Mats Ringborg	Mats Ringborg (born 1945)	2007	2011	3–4 years	José Ángel Gurría	
11	Anders Ahnlid	Anders Ahnlid (born 1960)	2011	2013	1–2 years	José Ángel Gurría	
12	Annika Markovic	Annika Markovic (born 1964)	February 2014	2018	3–4 years	José Ángel Gurría	
13	Anna Brandt	Anna Brandt (born 1961)	1 September 2018	2023	4–5 years	José Ángel Gurría; Mathias Cormann	
14	Helena Sångeland	Helena Sångeland (born 1961)	24 August 2023	Incumbent	3 years, 14 days	Mathias Cormann	
