= Karl-Gustav Lagerfelt =

Swedish diplomat (1909–1986)

Baron Karl-Gustav Lagerfelt
- Born: Israël Karl-Gustav Eugène Lagerfelt; 21 November 1909; Jönköping, Sweden
- Died: 11 December 1986 (aged 77); Strasbourg, France
- Other name: "K-G"
- Occupation: Diplomat
- Years active: 1935–1977
- Spouse(s): Sara Champion de Crespigny (m. 1947; died 1967) Monique Suetens (m. 1974–1986)
- Children: 2, including Caroline

Baron Israël Karl-Gustav "K-G" Eugène Lagerfelt (21 November 1909 – 11 December 1986) was a Swedish diplomat. He had a long career in the Swedish Foreign Service, beginning in the mid-1930s with postings in Helsinki, London, Paris, and Stockholm, where he rose to senior positions within the Ministry for Foreign Affairs. In 1950, he represented Sweden in delivering the Prosecutor General's report on the assassination of Count Folke Bernadotte to the government of Israel, and he later served as Sweden's diplomatic representative in Japan and as envoy in Tokyo.

From the mid-1950s, Lagerfelt held a series of senior international appointments. He was Sweden's Permanent Representative to several European institutions, including the European Coal and Steel Community and the Council of Europe, before serving as ambassador to Vienna and The Hague. He later became Sweden's Permanent Representative to the United Nations Office in Geneva and chaired the council of the United Nations Conference on Trade and Development.

== Early life ==
Karl-Gustav was born into the noble Lagerfelt family in Jönköping, Sweden, on 21 November 1909. His father, Baron Gustaf Adolf Lagerfelt (born 1880), was a captain in the Småland Artillery Regiment and served on the Jönköping city council from 1915 to 1919. His mother, Baroness Gertrud Ida Eugenia von Essen (born 1881), was the daughter of the chamberlain, Baron Carl von Essen, and Countess Charlotta Gustava Lewenhaupt. He also had a brother, Carl-Fredrik, who was two years younger.

He completed his upper secondary education in Örebro on 10 May 1927 and enrolled at Uppsala University on 14 September the same year. He received a Candidate of Law degree in 1932 and a Bachelor of Arts in 1935, before becoming an attaché at the Ministry for Foreign Affairs in Stockholm in 1935.

== Career ==
Lagerfelt served in Helsinki in 1936 and in London in 1938, and also at the Foreign Ministry in Stockholm in 1938. He became second secretary in 1939 and first secretary at the Foreign Ministry in Stockholm in 1943. In the same year, he served as first secretary in London, followed by Paris in 1947, and again at the Foreign Ministry in Stockholm in 1948. He was appointed director at the Foreign Ministry in Stockholm in 1950 (acting from 1948).

That year, he submitted to the government of Israel, as a representative of the Swedish government, the report of the Swedish Prosecutor General concerning the murder of Count Folke Bernadotte. Lagerfelt served as diplomatic representative in Japan in 1951 and as envoy in Tokyo from 1952 to 1956, during the period of the Sweden v. Yamaguchi case.

He subsequently served as Permanent Representative of Sweden to the High Authority of the European Coal and Steel Community in Luxembourg from 1956 to 1963, as Permanent Representative of Sweden to the Council of Europe from 1957 to 1963, and as Permanent Representative to the European Atomic Energy Community and the European Economic Community in Brussels from 1959 to 1963. Lagerfelt was ambassador to Vienna from 1964 to 1969 and to The Hague from 1969 to 1972. He served as Permanent Representative of Sweden to the United Nations in Geneva from 1972 to 1975 and was chairman of the council of the United Nations Conference on Trade and Development from 1976 to 1977. He later worked as a consultant at the Volvo International Development Corporation from 1978 to 1979 and chaired the parliamentary investigations into the Inter-American Development Bank from 1980 to 1982. He also served as deputy counsel and expert to the United Nations General Assembly in 1967, 1976, and 1977.

== Personal life ==
In 1947, Lagerfelt married Sara Champion de Crespigny (1914–1967), the daughter of the British major Vierville Champion de Crespigny and Nora (née McSloy). In 1974, he married Monique Suetens (1932–2010), the daughter of the Belgian director Albert Suetens and Madeleine (née Limpens). Lagerfelt was the father of Caroline (born 1947) and Johan (born 1949).

Lagerfelt was the owner of the mansion Säbylund in Kumla Municipality until his son Johan bought the property in 1970.

There are still a few left of a breed of aristocrats who perhaps feel more at home in a bygone era than in the present, but who for that very reason also have a distance from the day-to-day political tumult and, at best, a certain breadth of vision. In a corresponding way, there are also a few remaining of a dying breed of civil servants who take pride in serving the King and the government—regardless of which party or parties the voters, in their folly, have seen fit to entrust with the task of assisting the King with counsel. Lagerfeldt was one of these. He belonged to both categories at the same time. There is no doubt that K-G throughout his life, at every election, cast his vote for the Right Party—or, as it is now called to his chagrin, the Moderates. But he devoted his best energies to loyally serving Per Albin Hansson, Tage Erlander, and Olof Palme. [...] No government ever needed to doubt his loyalty. [...] K-G did not care for socialism. But social democrats he was happy to associate with.

— Carl Lidbom, Diplomat and tough trade negotiator, Svenska Dagbladet (13 December 1986)

== Death ==
Lagerfelt died on 11 December 1986. The funeral service was held on 23 December 1986 in Kumla Church in Kumla. He was interred on the same day at Kumla Cemetery.

== Awards and decorations ==
=== Swedish ===
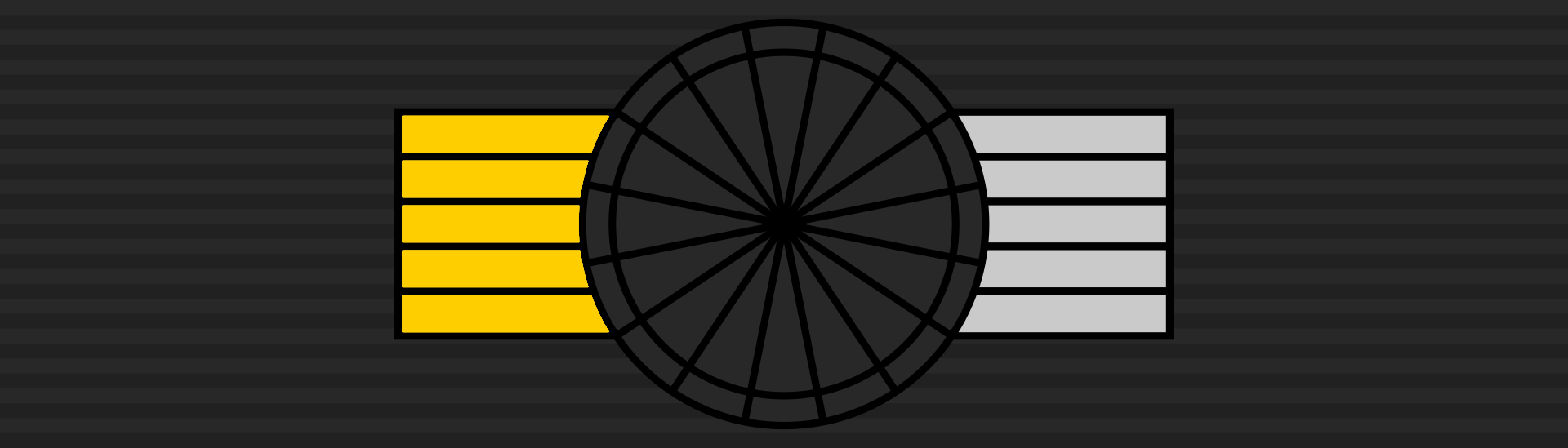
- (Sweden) Commander 1st Class of the Order of the Polar Star (11 November 1966)
- (Sweden) Commander of the Order of the Polar Star (23 November 1961)
- (Sweden) Knight of the Order of the Polar Star (1949)
- Knight of the Order of Saint John in Sweden

=== Foreign ===
- (Japan) First Class of the Order of the Sacred Treasure
- Commander First Class of the Order of the Lion of Finland
- (Hungary) Commander of the Hungarian Order of Merit
- Knight First Class of the Order of the White Rose of Finland
- (France) Knight of the Legion of Honour

== Honours ==
- Herald of Orders of His Majesty the King (Kungl. Maj:ts Orden).

== Bibliography ==
- Lagerfelt, Karl Gustav (1960). De sex i verksamhet: föredrag vid Exportföreningens årsstämma måndagen den 25 april 1960 [The Six in Action: Presentation at the Export Association's Annual General Meeting on Monday, 25 April 1960]. Svensk export, 0039-6508; 1960:7:bil. (in Swedish). Stockholm: Exportfören. SELIBR 728916.

Diplomatic posts
Preceded by Leif Öhrvall	Diplomatic representative of Sweden to Japan; 1951–1952	Succeeded by Himself as Envoy
Preceded by Himself as Diplomatic representative	Envoy of Sweden to Japan; 1952–1956	Succeeded by Tage Grönwall
Preceded by Lennart Finnmark	Permanent Representative of Sweden to the ECSC, Euratom, and the EEC; 1956–1963	Succeeded by Sten Lindh
Preceded by Ingemar Hägglöf	Permanent Representative of Sweden to the Council of Europe; 1957–1963	Succeeded by Sten Lindh
Preceded by Sven Allard	Ambassador of Sweden to Austria; 1964–1969	Succeeded by Lennart Petri
Preceded by Jens Malling	Ambassador of Sweden to the Netherlands; 1969–1972	Succeeded by Tord Hagen
Preceded by Erik von Sydow	Permanent Representative of Sweden to the United Nations in Geneva; 1972–1975	Succeeded by Carl De Geer
