= Kumla Church, Närke =

Church building in Kumla Municipality, Sweden

Coordinates: 59°7′15″N 15°9′16″E

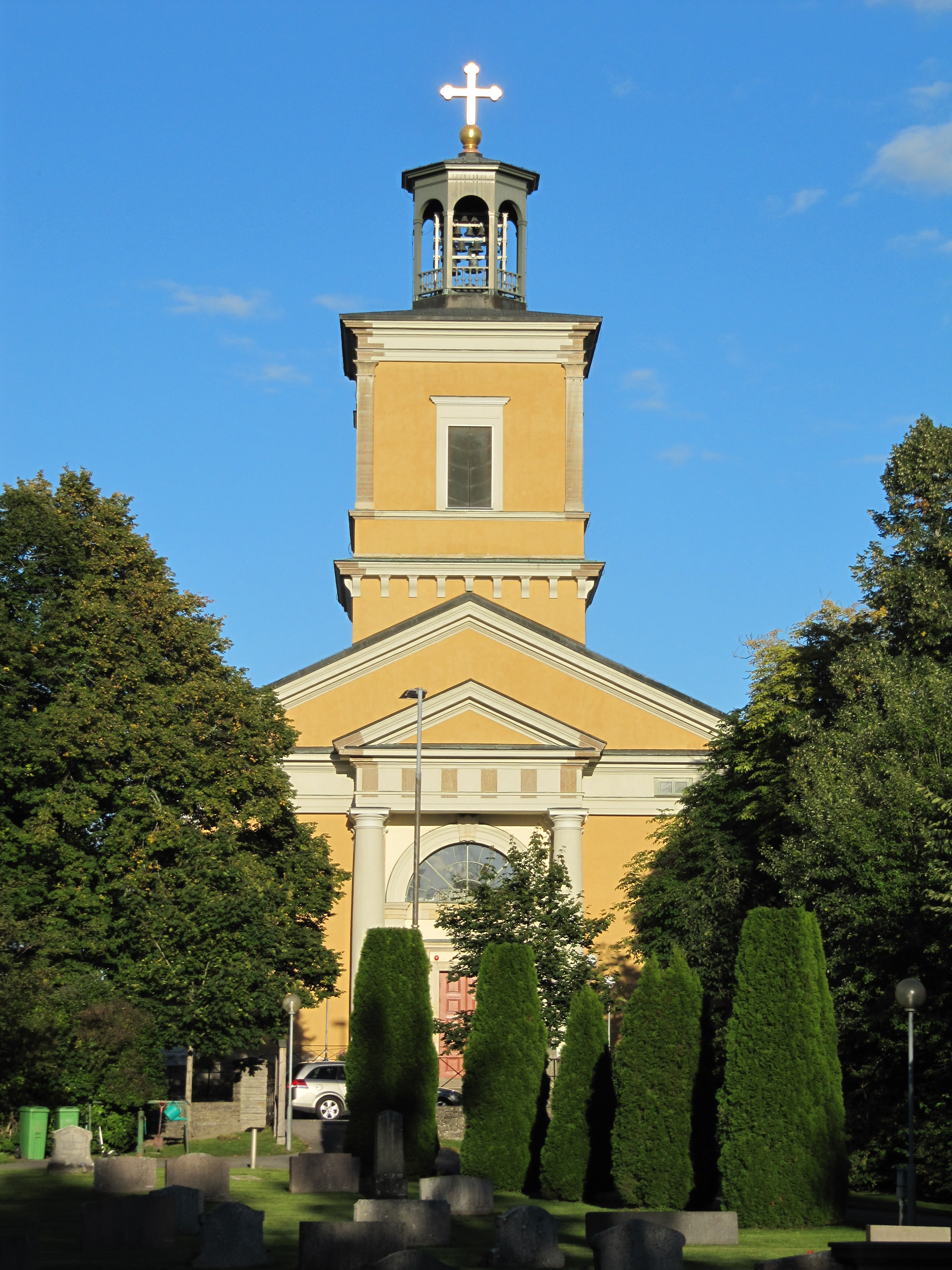

Kumla Church (Swedish: Kumla kyrka) is located in Kumla in Närke, Sweden.

== History ==
In the 12th century a church with a tower on the western side of the building was built in the Romanesque style. In the 13th century it was rebuilt and became an aisleless church with a western nave. A few centuries later the church was extended to the south and another nave constructed. Until 1829 the church had a belltower, built of medieval "kastal".

The medieval church was demolished when a new neo-classical church was built between 1829–34. The Architect was Per Axel Nyström. In 1968 the church burned down and a new church was built 1971–72, designed by Jerk Alton. It was opened on the first Sunday of Advent by bishop Tord Simonsson. There is a small museum in the bell tower.
