= High Authority of the European Coal and Steel Community =

ECSC institution

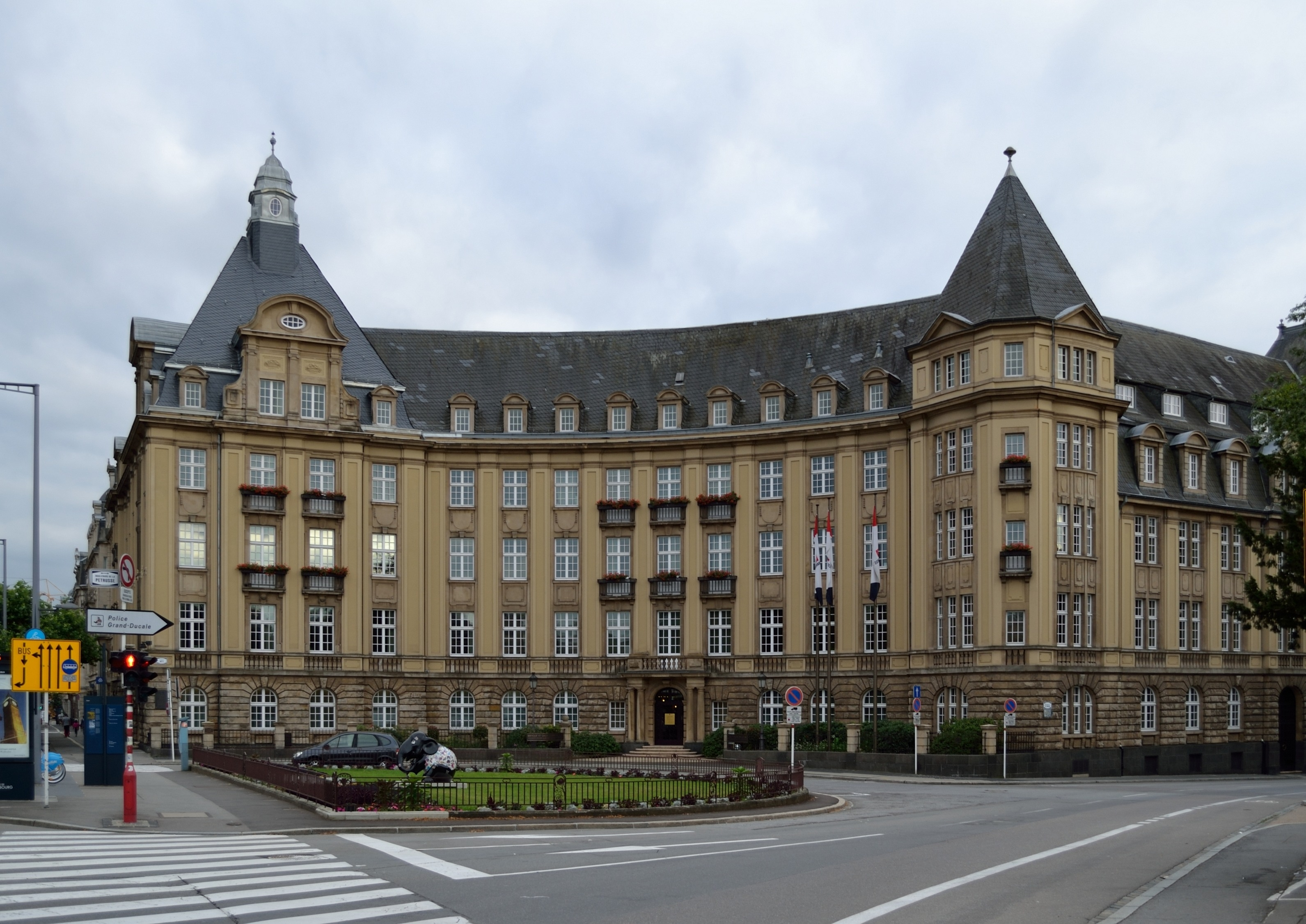
Former headquarters of the High Authority on Place de Metz in Luxembourg

The High Authority was the executive branch of the former European Coal and Steel Community (ECSC). It was created in 1951 and disbanded in 1967 when it was merged into the European Commission.

== History ==
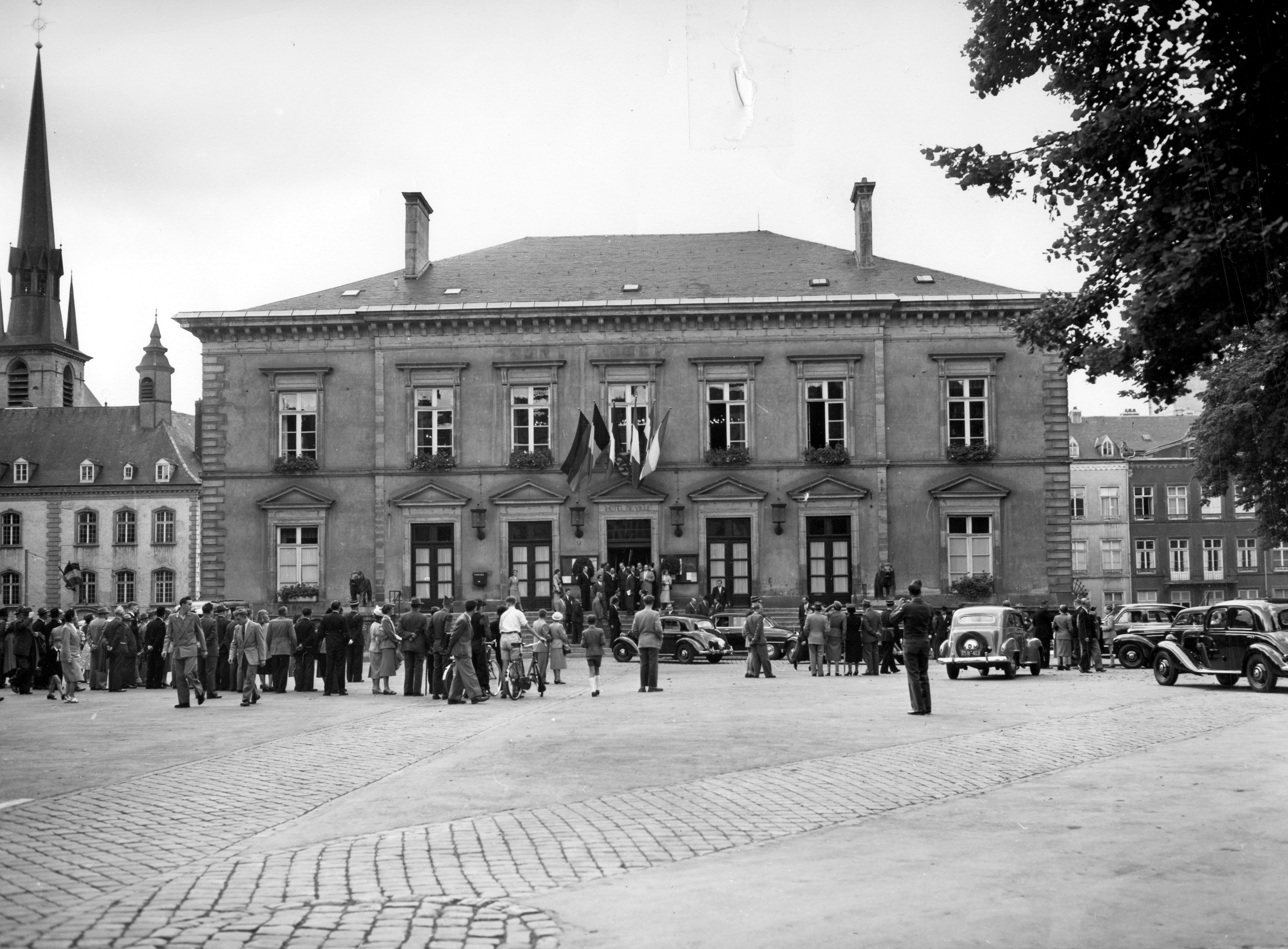
The inaugural meeting of the High Authority took place at Luxembourg City Hall (pictured in 1952).

The High Authority was at the core of the idea of the ECSC. It was to be an independent, supranational executive checked by a Common Assembly. There were concerns about this power, leading to a Council (of governments) and Parliament (of MPs) to be created to act as a counterweight. The inaugural sitting of the Authority was held at Luxembourg City Hall on 10 August 1952. Jean Monnet, the architect of the ECSC, was elected as its first President.

The supranational power exercised by the Authority did prompt suspicion by some, for example the government of France who ensured that in the European Economic Community (EEC) and European Atomic Energy Community (Euratom) more power would be in the hands of the council.

The Merger Treaty came into force in 1967; this combined the independent institutions of the ECSC and Euratom with those of the EEC. From that time the High Authority ceased to exist, its duties being taken on by the Commission of the European Communities. The administration of Rinaldo Del Bo ended before the merger so an interim President was appointed to oversee the merger, Albert Coppé. The Authority met for the last time on 28 June 1967.

Signed
In force
Document
1951
1952
Paris Treaty
1957
1958
Rome treaties: EEC Treaty Euratom Treaty
1965
1967
Merger Treaty
2007
2009
Lisbon Treaty

Commission of the European Atomic Energy Community
Commission of the European Communities
European Commission

High Authority of the European Coal and Steel Community

Commission of the European Economic Community

== Powers ==
The Authority's principal innovation was its supranational character. It had a broad area of competence to ensure the objectives of the treaty were met and that the common market functioned smoothly. The High Authority could issue three types of legal instruments: Decisions, which were entirely binding laws; Recommendations, which had binding aims but with methods left to member states; and Opinions, which had no legal force.

== Composition ==
High Authority of the European Coal and Steel Community (ECSC) consisted of nine members, appointed for six years. The Treaty of Paris stipulated that the High Authority could contain no more than two members of the same nationality.

Under Article 10 of the ECSC Treaty, the governments of the six Member States jointly agreed on the appointment of eight members of the High Authority. The eight governments-selected members then elected a ninth member among themselves; the candidate was elected if he received at least five votes. The purpose of this mechanism was to give the High Authority a supranational character: its members were appointed with the agreement of the national governments, but once appointed they were required to act independently and in the general interest of the Community. The first High Authority, which began its work on 10 August 1952, consisted of nine members. Its actual national composition was: France – 2, West Germany – 2, Belgium – 2, Italy – 1, Luxembourg – 1, Netherlands – 1. The first President was Jean Monnet. Importantly, Monnet was the member who was co-opted by the other eight members, rather than being directly appointed by one of the six governments.

=== President ===
The President was elected by the other appointed members, rather than directly by member states (as is the case of the current Commission President). The first president was Jean Monnet.

N.	Portrait	President (Born–Died)	State	Took office	Left office	Authority	Party	Group	Electoral mandate	Refs
1		Jean Monnet (1888–1979)	France	10 August 1952	3 June 1955	Monnet	Independent	None	–	
1		Jean Monnet (1888–1979)	France	2 years, 297 days		Monnet	Independent	None	–	
2		René Mayer (1897–1965)	France	3 June 1955	13 January 1958	Mayer	PR	None	–	
2		René Mayer (1897–1965)	France	2 years, 224 days		Mayer	PR	None	–	
3		Paul Finet (1897–1995)	Belgium	13 January 1958	15 September 1959	Finet	Independent	None	–	
3		Paul Finet (1897–1995)	Belgium	1 year, 246 days		Finet	Independent	None	–	
4		Piero Malvestiti (1899–1964)	Italy	15 September 1959	22 October 1963	Malvestiti	DC	None	–	
4		Piero Malvestiti (1899–1964)	Italy	4 years, 51 days		Malvestiti	DC	None	–	
5		Rinaldo Del Bo (1916–1991)	Italy	22 October 1963	1 March 1967	Del Bo	DC	None	–	
5		Rinaldo Del Bo (1916–1991)	Italy	3 years, 130 days		Del Bo	DC	None	–	
6		Albert Coppé (1911–1999)	Belgium	1 March 1967	5 July 1967	Coppé	CD&V	None	–	
6		Albert Coppé (1911–1999)	Belgium	126 days		Coppé	CD&V	None	–	

== Location ==
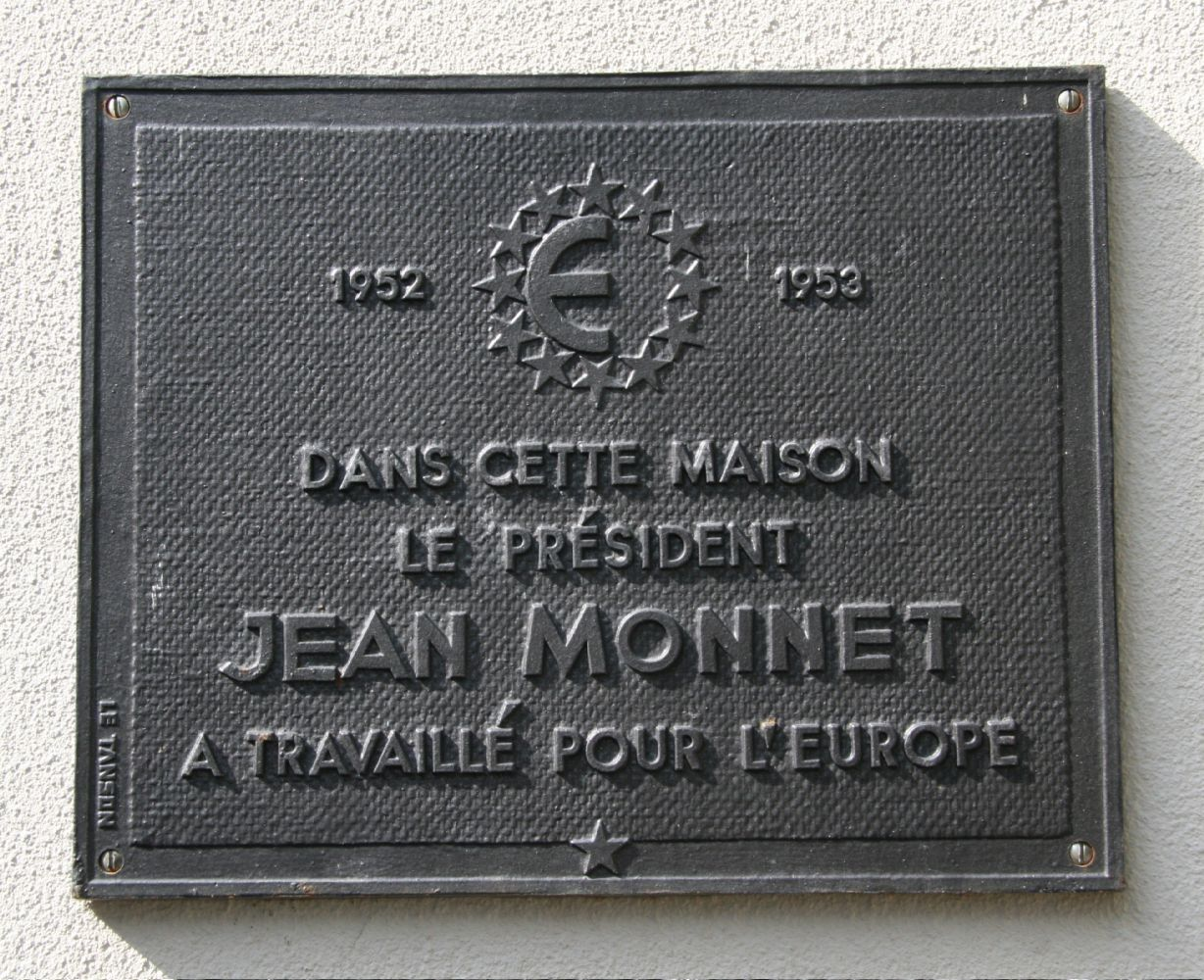
Memorial plaque on the former Hôtel Grand-Chef

The headquarters of the High Authority were in Luxembourg City, the seat of most ECSC institutions. This was only intended as the provisional seat as no formal agreement was reached at the ECSC's conference in 1952.

Luxembourg had proposed it be the provisional seat (except for the Common Assembly which was to be in Strasbourg) until an agreement was reached. Future executives, the Commissions of the EEC and Euratom, would eventually be based in Brussels.

The High Authority first had its offices in hotels, initially the Hôtel des Forges in Chateau de Beggen and then the Hôtel Grand-Chef in Mondorf-les-Bains. In 1953 it moved to the former seat of Luxembourg Railways on Place de Metz in Luxembourg, a grand building that later hosted the European Investment Bank from 1968 to 1980 and, since 1987, headquarters offices of the Banque et Caisse d'Épargne de l'État.

== See also ==
- European Commission
- European Coal and Steel Community
- Institutions of the European Union
- Location of European Union institutions
- History of the European Communities (1945-1957)
- History of the European Communities (1958-1972)
- European Union law
