= The Best Intentions =

1992 film directed by Bille August

- Theatrical release poster
- Swedish: Den goda viljan
- Written by: Ingmar Bergman
- Directed by: Bille August
- Starring: Samuel Fröler; Pernilla August; Max von Sydow; Ghita Nørby
- Country of origin: Sweden
- Original language: Swedish

Production
- Producer: Ingrid Dahlberg
- Cinematography: Jörgen Persson
- Running time: 325 minutes (television); 181 minutes (theatrical)
- Budget: kr 67 million

Original release
- Release: December 1991

The Best Intentions (Swedish: Den goda viljan) is a 1991 Swedish television drama film directed by Bille August and written by Ingmar Bergman. It is semi-autobiographical, telling the story of the complex relationship between Bergman's parents, Erik Bergman and Karin Åkerblom, who are renamed Henrik and Anna in the film but retain their true surnames. The film documents the courtship and the difficult early years of their marriage, until the point when Anna becomes pregnant with their second son, who corresponds to Ingmar himself. Samuel Fröler and Pernilla August played Henrik and Anna, respectively.

Ingmar Bergman wrote the screenplay based on scattered notes and conversations with his parents in their later years. At the time, it was one of the most expensive Swedish films ever made. It can be viewed as a continuation of Bergman's 1982 film Fanny and Alexander. After Bergman had ostensibly retired from directing following Fanny and Alexander, he chose August as his director on the strength of the latter's 1988 Pelle the Conqueror, on condition that Pernilla August be cast as Anna.

The film was condensed into a theatrical version in 1992 and won the Palme d'Or at the Cannes Film Festival.

== Plot ==
In the early 20th century, Henrik Bergman is studying to be a parish minister under the Church of Sweden. A poor man, he meets the wealthy Anna Åkerblom through his friend, Anna's brother Ernst. Anna is vain and stubborn, and in Henrik's belief she is elitist, yet she is also attractive and capable of enjoying pleasure. Although Henrik lives in a sexual relationship with Frida, a waitress, Anna seduces him and proposes an engagement. As Henrik and Anna begin to see more of each other, Henrik secretly continues living with Frida. While speaking with Anna's mother Karin, Henrik confesses that he feels unwelcome among the Åkerbloms. Karin tells him frankly that she feels Anna needs a mature man who can nurture her, but he is lacking on both counts. Karin also tells Anna that Henrik is still living with Frida, a fact verified by the family. Henrik and Anna stop seeing each other until Frida appeals to Anna to take Henrik back, citing his misery.

While Anna is treated for tuberculosis in Switzerland, a brother is sent to tell Henrik that she no longer wishes to speak to him. However, unknown to her parents, Anna sends a letter to Ernst to be forwarded to Henrik, telling him she wishes to resume their relationship. Her parents receive the letter and Anna's father Johan opens it, after which Karin reads it and burns it. After Johan dies, Karin confesses the act to Anna, who angrily seeks Henrik. By then, Henrik is planning to go to Forsboda, a remote village in northern Sweden, to work in a parish whose head minister is aged and ailing. Anna resolves to go with him, and they marry despite their class conflicts.

The Bergmans have their first son, Dag, but Henrik becomes embroiled in the local strike action, as he refuses to endorse poor working conditions and lends his church for a socialist meeting. This displeases Nordenson, who also dislikes Bergman's manner of instruction of Nordenson's daughters, as Nordenson refuses to kneel with his wife and girls. In the meantime, the Bergmans take in Petrus, a troubled orphaned boy. Later, Henrik and Anna are unexpectedly summoned to Stockholm to meet Queen Victoria, who chairs a board managing Sophiahemmet Hospital and is seeking a chaplain, with the archbishop recommending Henrik. During the meeting, Victoria asks him if he believes suffering is sent by God. He replies suffering is useless and God views the world with horror, and leaves the palace fuming at having to flatter the Queen. The Bergmans decline the position, but the villagers are upset they did not hear of the offer except through rumours, and are disturbed by Henrik publicly humiliating Nordenson in church.

Upset, and expecting her second child, Anna insists on sending Petrus away, saying she did not agree to a permanent adoption and she dislikes the boy. Petrus overhears the conversation, and furious, kidnaps Dag and carries him to an icy river. The Bergmans see them and give chase, with Henrik saving Dag and slapping down Petrus, after which the boy leaves. In despair, Anna decides she can no longer live in Forsboda and takes Dag to the Åkerblom house, while Henrik at first resolves to stay in the village. He finally accepts the position in Stockholm and asks Anna to come with him, and she replies this is all she wants.

== Cast ==
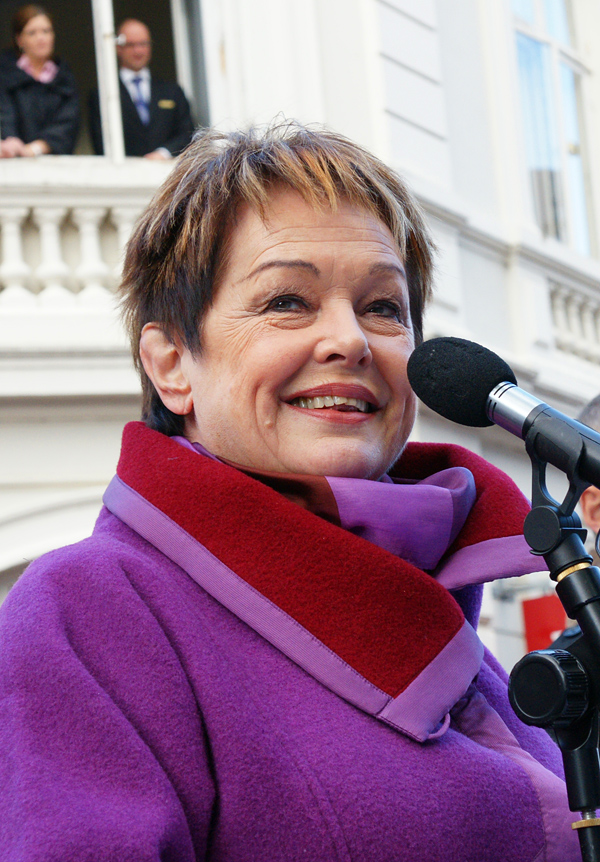
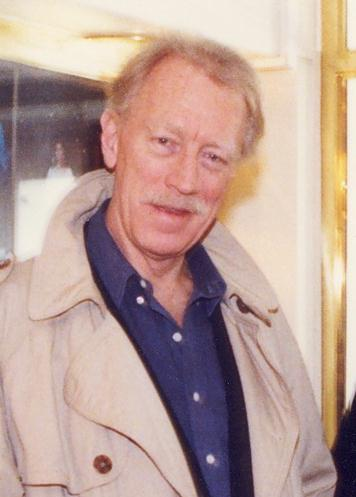
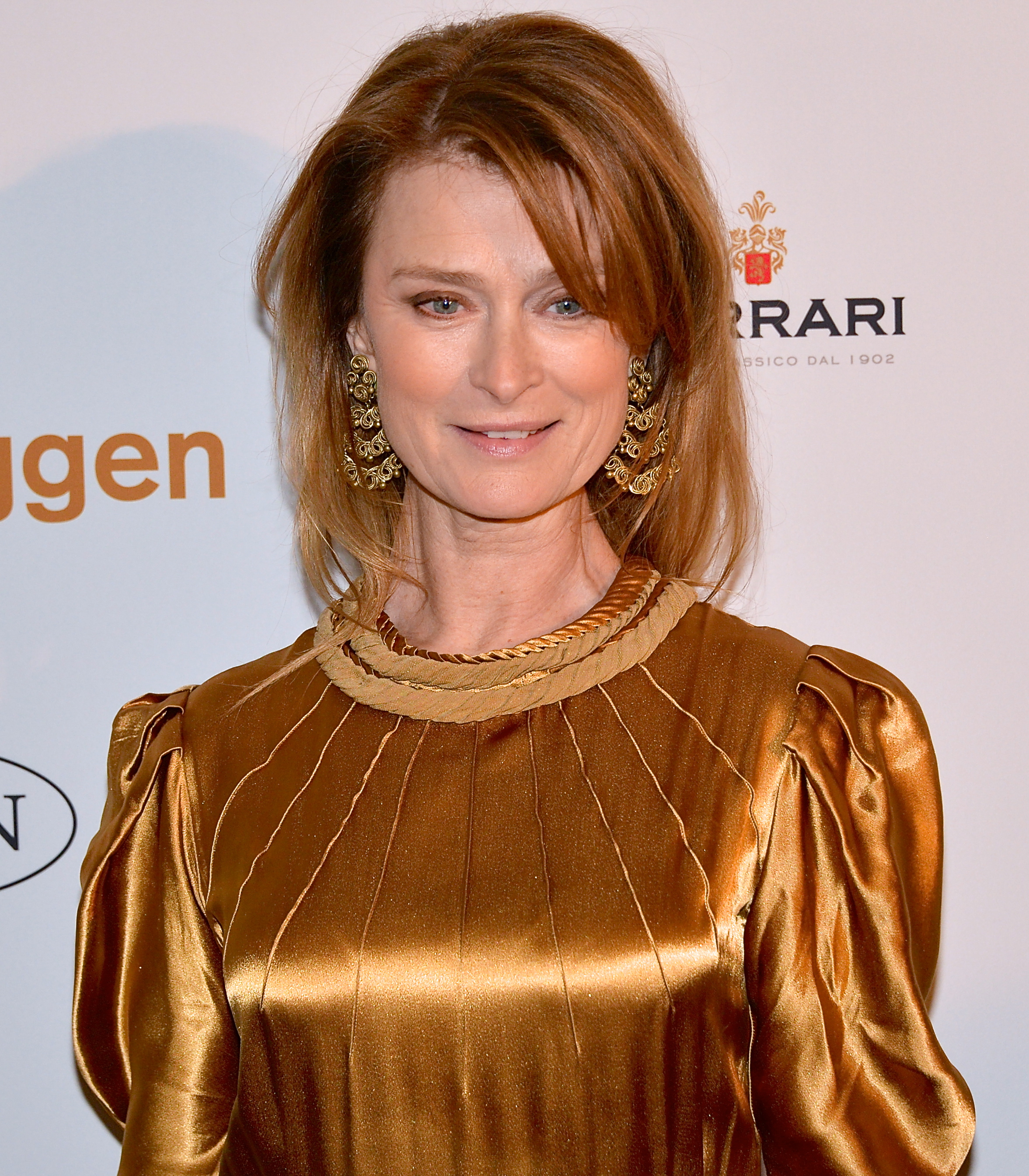
Ghita Nørby and Max von Sydow star as Anna's parents, the Åkerbloms, while Lena Endre appears as Frida.
- Samuel Fröler as Henrik Bergman
- Pernilla August as Anna Åkerblom Bergman
- Max von Sydow as Johan Åkerblom, Anna's father
- Ghita Nørby as Karin Åkerblom, Anna's mother
- Björn Kjellman as Ernst Åkerblom, Anna's brother
- Börje Ahlstedt as Carl Åkerblom, Anna's half-brother
- Björn Granath as Oscar Åkerblom, Anna's half-brother
- Gunilla Nyroos as Svea Åkerblom, Oscar's wife
- Michael Segerström as Gustav Åkerblom, Anna's half-brother
- Eva Gröndahl as Martha Åkerblom, Gustav's wife
- Mona Malm as Alma Bergman, Henrik's mother
- Keve Hjelm as Fredrik Bergman, Henrik's paternal grandfather
- Margaretha Krook as Blenda Bergman, Henrik's aunt
- Irma Christenson as Ebba Bergman, Henrik's aunt
- Sif Ruud as Beda Bergman, Henrik's aunt
- Lena Endre as Frida Strandberg, Henrik's first fiancée
- Ernst-Hugo Järegård as Professor Sundelius
- Hans Alfredson as Rev. Gransjö
- Anita Björk as Queen Victoria
- Sten Ljunggren as Svante, Robert's father

== Production ==
=== Development ===
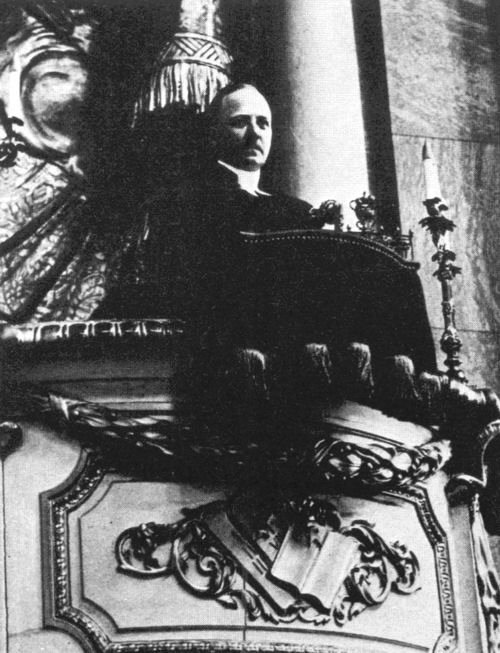
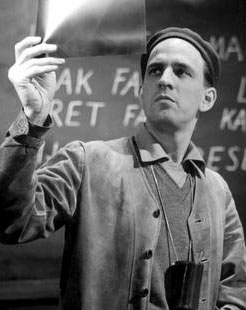
The history of Church of Sweden minister Erik Bergman influenced his son Ingmar, who wrote the screenplay.

Semi-retired director Ingmar Bergman conceived of the film while writing his memoirs The Magic Lantern. He wrote the screenplay based on the early years of the marriage of his parents, Lutheran minister Erik Bergman and Karin Åkerblom, between 1909 and 1918, attempting to see them less as "mythical giants who dominated his childhood", and more as complicated people. By ending the film before he was born, he examined their conflicts that did not have to do with him.

In writing his parents' story before his birth, Ingmar found himself limited to "fragmentary notes, brief tales, isolated episodes". Many of Karin's letters to Erik were lost and presumed destroyed by Karin. Ingmar's sister Margareta Bergman possessed most of their parents' papers, and some were published by 1992. Erik had written an autobiography for Margareta in 1941. One document Ingmar had was his mother's diary, though it was not a source for many events in the film. He attempted to capture his parents' characters based on his documents and his conversations with them in later years.

Professor Rochelle Wright details where the film differs from history, noting that unlike Henrik and Anna, Erik and Karin in fact met as second cousins. While Karin's parents were opposed to her marrying Erik, there are not many details as to how this conflict played out in reality. The separation of Erik and Karin related not to her treatment for an illness in Switzerland, but rather to her studies for nursing in Stockholm and Gothenburg.

Ingmar completed the screenplay in 1989. He respected Danish director Bille August and submitted the screenplay to him. August was facing budget difficulties with the Hollywood film he was working on, and abandoned it to travel to Stockholm to meet Bergman, whom he admired. Bergman told him he had seen August's film Pelle the Conqueror seven times and that August would have complete control over the direction of The Best Intentions. In a press conference in August 1989, Bergman said the film could be seen as related to The Magic Lantern and his semi-autobiographical 1982 film Fanny and Alexander.

=== Filming ===
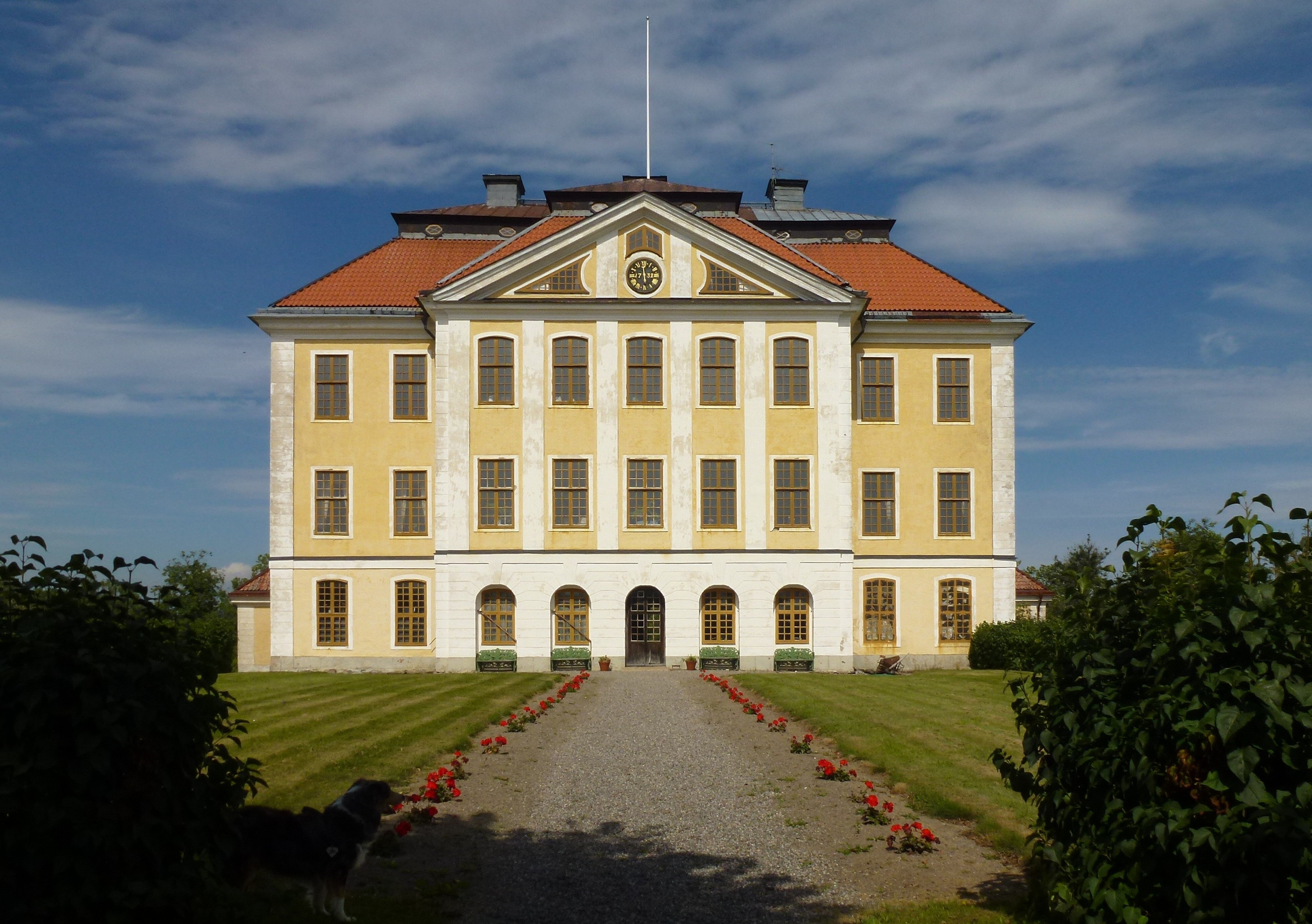
Tureholm Castle was a shooting location for the film.

Bergman insisted on the casting of Pernilla Östergren as Anna, after she played Maj in Fanny and Alexander. Bille August had not met her before The Best Intentions, but later married her. Pernilla accepted the role, not knowing it had been written for her, which she said would have frightened her.

Producer Ingrid Dahlberg secured the kr 67 million budget by approaching various broadcasters across Europe. It was estimated to be the most expensive Scandinavian film in history. The Best Intentions took eight months to film, beginning in July 1990. Several locations across Sweden were used, including Stockholm Film Studios, Uppsala County and Tureholm Castle.

== Release ==
The film was announced at a press conference in Stockholm in December 1991. To avoid taking attention away from Bille August, Bergman did not attend. The six-hour version of the film ran on Swedish television in four parts in December 1991.

The film played at the Cannes Film Festival in May 1992. Distribution for the three-hour theatrical version in the United States, Japan and numerous countries in Europe was secured by July 1992.

== Reception ==
=== Critical reception ===
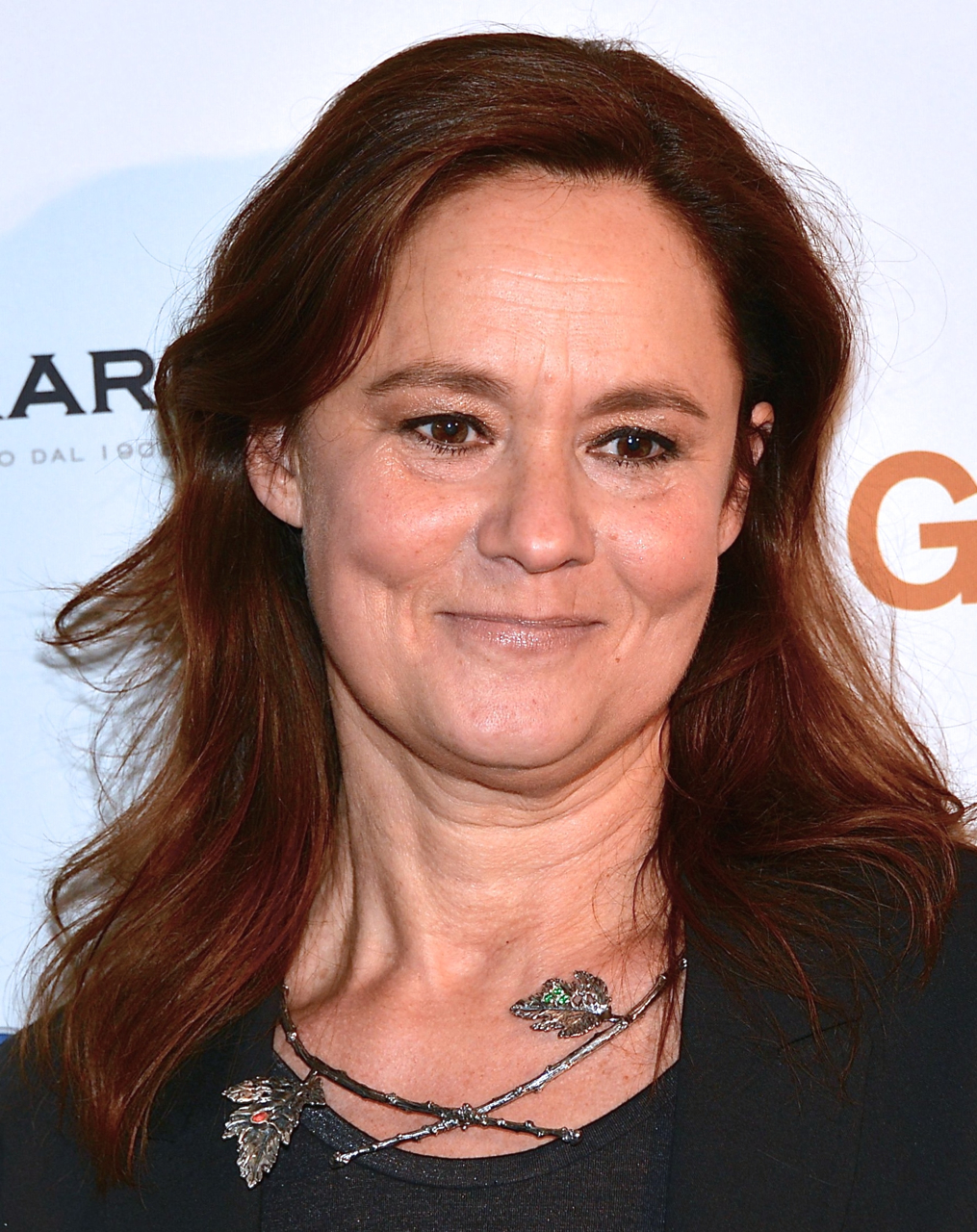
Pernilla August received positive reviews for her performance, as well as the Best Actress Award at the 1992 Cannes Film Festival.

Derek Elley of Variety wrote the film "packs a sustained emotional wallop that lightens its three-hour span," and Pernilla August "holds the screen in a series of throat-catching sequences." Janet Maslin, writing for The New York Times, said that the second boy Anna is pregnant with at the end of the film is Ingmar Bergman, "whose screenplay looks back at the social, economic and personal forces that turned his parents' early years together into a tug of war," while Bille August's direction is "more decorous and less bold." Maslin stated the film "loses momentum" with the romance story lacking significance. Peter Travers of Rolling Stone panned the film as a "three-hour Swedish soap opera" that "fails to live up to its pedigree," while calling Pernilla August "wonderfully expressive" and Max von Sydow and Ghita Nørby excellent. Entertainment Weekly's Owen Gleiberman gave the film an A, praising it as "the most moving film I’ve seen this year," and said that Pernilla's "radiant sensuality and pride evoke an entire Bergman universe of emotionally engulfing women." Kenneth Turan, writing for The Los Angeles Times, felt the film is missing Bergman's direction, but it has strength in his screenplay and an acting quality "uniformly quite high," with "special nods" to Pernilla and von Sydow. People critics judged the film to be "equally memorable" to Bergman's 1973 miniseries Scenes from a Marriage, filled with "vivid, literate confrontations" that Bille August gives "naturalistic fervor".

The Time Out review states The Best Intentions lacks the joy of Fanny and Alexander and the length of the film is challenging for the viewer. In 2016, The Hollywood Reporter ranked the film 69th among 69 counted winners of the Palme d'Or to date, concluding "August’s rather bland direction made this a forgettable Palme." The film has an 81% score on Rotten Tomatoes, based on 16 reviews.

Critic Vincent Canby also identified Sunday's Children (1992), directed by Daniel Bergman and written by Ingmar, as "a continuation" of Fanny and Alexander and The Best Intentions. Author Geoffrey Macnab wrote that whereas Ingmar's recollections of Erik are damning in his 1982 film Fanny and Alexander, his 1991–92 study of his father is "far more forgiving" in The Best Intentions and Sunday's Children.

=== Accolades ===
The film won the Palme d'Or and Best Actress for August at the 1992 Cannes Film Festival. At the 28th Guldbagge Awards, the film was nominated for six awards, winning two, for August as Best Actress and Bergman for Best Screenplay.

The film was entered as the Swedish submission for the Academy Award for Best Foreign Language Film in 1992. The Academy deemed the film ineligible because the same material had previously aired as a television miniseries.

Award	Date of ceremony	Category	Recipient(s)	Result	Ref(s)
Cannes Film Festival	7–18 May 1992	Palme d'Or	Bille August	Won	
Cannes Film Festival	7–18 May 1992	Best Actress	Pernilla August	Won	
Guldbagge Awards	1 March 1993	Best Film	Ingrid Dahlberg	Nominated	
Guldbagge Awards	1 March 1993	Best Director	Bille August	Nominated	
Guldbagge Awards	1 March 1993	Best Screenplay	Ingmar Bergman	Won	
Guldbagge Awards	1 March 1993	Best Actor	Samuel Fröler	Nominated	
Guldbagge Awards	1 March 1993	Best Actress	Pernilla August	Won	
Guldbagge Awards	1 March 1993	Best Cinematography	Jörgen Persson	Nominated	
National Society of Film Critics	3 January 1993	Best Foreign Language Film	The Best Intentions	3rd Place	
National Society of Film Critics	3 January 1993	Best Actress	Pernilla August	3rd Place	
