= List of ambassadors of Sweden to Greece =

Ambassador of Sweden to Greece
- Lesser coat of arms of the Kingdom of Sweden
- Incumbent; Håkan Emsgård since January 2025
- Ministry for Foreign Affairs; Swedish Embassy, Athens
- Style: His or Her Excellency (formal); Mr. or Madam Ambassador (informal)
- Reports to: Minister for Foreign Affairs
- Residence: Ioanni Metaxa 56, Filothei
- Seat: Athens, Greece
- Appointer: Government of Sweden
- Term length: No fixed term
- Inaugural holder: Einar af Wirsén
- Formation: 1921
- Website: Swedish Embassy, Athens

The Ambassador of Sweden to Greece (known formally as the Ambassador of the Kingdom of Sweden to the Hellenic Republic) is the official representative of the government of Sweden to the president of Greece and government of Greece.

== History ==
Sweden has had diplomatic relations with Greece since 1833.

In a report on the reorganization of the Ministry for Foreign Affairs in early January 1921, it was proposed that the head of the mission in Constantinople also be accredited in Athens, Greece. However, the experts suggested that, for the time being, the minister should be accredited only in Sofia, Bulgaria. The ministerial post in Bucharest, Romania was established the same year, with responsibilities covering not only Romania but also Greece and Yugoslavia. An additional first secretary position, created the same year and stationed in Athens to act as chargé d'affaires ad interim in the minister's absence, was abolished by a parliamentary decision in 1924.

Knut Richard Thyberg was the first resident Swedish minister in Greece. He arrived in August 1944. As the Germans did not permit any foreign diplomatic representatives, Minister Thyberg initially held the title of Swedish consul general and only gained full diplomatic status after Greece's liberation and the Germans' withdrawal in October 1944.

In May 1956, an agreement was reached between the Swedish and Greek governments on the mutual elevation of the respective countries' legations to embassies. The diplomatic rank was thereafter changed to ambassador instead of envoy extraordinary and minister plenipotentiary.

== List of representatives ==
Name	Period	Title	Resident / Concurrent accreditation	Notes	Presented credentials	Ref
Kingdom of Greece (1832–1924)
Carl Peter von Heidenstam	2 May 1833 – 5 June 1878	Chargé d'affaires	Consul General to the United States of the Ionian Islands on 8 January 1838	Died in office		
Einar af Wirsén	26 September 1921 – 1924	Envoy	Resident in Bucharest			
Nils Wikstrand	1921–1923	Chargé d'affaires ad interim (Note: Held the diplomatic rank of first legation secretary.)				
Johan Beck-Friis	11 November 1923 – 1924	Chargé d'affaires ad interim (Note: Held the diplomatic rank of first legation secretary.)				
Second Hellenic Republic (1924–1935)
Jonas Alströmer	1925–1933	Envoy	Resident in Bucharest			
Erik Boheman	1933–1934	Envoy	Resident in Istanbul		28 November 1933	
Wilhelm Winther	1934–1935	Envoy	Resident in Ankara			
Kingdom of Greece (1935–1973)
Wilhelm Winther	1935–1937	Envoy	Resident in Ankara			
Eric Gyllenstierna	1938–1939	Envoy	Resident in Ankara			
Sven Allard	1938–1939	Chargé d'affaires (Note: Held the diplomatic rank of legation counsellor.)				
Einar Modig	21 August 1939 (Note: Assumed the position in 1941.) – 1944	Envoy	Resident in Ankara			
Knut Richard Thyberg	1944–1948	Chargé d'affaires				
Alexis Aminoff	1949–1951	Envoy				
Tage Grönwall	1951–1956	Envoy				
Fritz Stackelberg	1956–1962	Ambassador				
Tage Grönwall	1962–1965	Ambassador				
Gösta Brunnström	1965–1972	Ambassador		Recalled to Stockholm in 1967 (Note: Brunnström was called back to Stockholm in protest on 15 December 1967 due to the coup d'état of 21 April of the same year. He never returned to Athens but retained his accreditation with the King of Greece until 1972.)		
Dag Bergman	1972–1973	Ambassador				
Third Hellenic Republic (1974–present)
Agda Rössel	1973–1976	Ambassador				
Ivar Öhman	1976–1980	Ambassador				
Iwo Dölling	1980–1985	Ambassador				
Hans Colliander	1985–1989	Ambassador				
Karl-Anders Wollter	1989–1992	Ambassador				
Anders Thunborg	1993–1993	Ambassador		Left the post due to illness		
Krister Kumlin	1993–1997	Ambassador				
Björn Elmér	1997–2002	Ambassador				
Mårten Grunditz	2002–2008	Ambassador				
Håkan Malmqvist	2008–2013	Ambassador				
Charlotte Wrangberg	2013–2017	Ambassador				
Charlotte Sammelin	1 September 2017 – 2021	Ambassador				
Johan Borgstam	September 2021 – 2024	Ambassador				
Håkan Emsgård	January 2025 – present	Ambassador			5 February 2025	

== See also ==
- Greece–Sweden relations
- Embassy of Sweden, Athens
