= Colliander =

Colliander is a surname. Notable people with the surname include:

- Hans Colliander (1924–2013), Swedish diplomat
- James Colliander (born 1967), American-Canadian mathematician
- Rafael Colliander (1878–1938), Finnish journalist and politician
- Sven Colliander (1890–1961), Swedish Army officer and horse rider
- Tito Colliander (1904–1989), Finnish Eastern Orthodox Christian writer
