= Ohmann =

Ohmann is a surname. Notable people with the surname include:

- Friedrich Ohmann (1858-1927), Austrian architect
- Marcel Ohmann (born 1991), German ice hockey player
- Richard Ohmann (1931–2021), American literary critic

== See also ==
- Ohman, another surname
