= List of ambassadors of Sweden to Malawi =

Ambassador of Sweden to Malawi
- Lesser coat of arms of the Kingdom of Sweden
- Incumbent; Per Lindgärde since August 2023
- Ministry for Foreign Affairs; Swedish Embassy, Harare
- Style: His or Her Excellency (formal); Mr. or Madam Ambassador (informal)
- Reports to: Minister for Foreign Affairs
- Seat: Harare, Zimbabwe
- Appointer: Government of Sweden
- Term length: No fixed term
- Inaugural holder: Olof Kaijser
- Formation: May 1968

The Ambassador of Sweden to Malawi (known formally as the Ambassador of the Kingdom of Sweden to the Republic of Malawi) is the official representative of the government of Sweden to the president of Malawi and government of Malawi. Until 2026, the ambassador was resident in Harare, Zimbabwe, with dual accreditation to Malawi.

== History ==
Following the proclamation of Malawi's independence on 6 July 1964, Swedish Prime Minister Tage Erlander stated in a congratulatory telegram to Prime Minister Hastings Banda that the Swedish government wished to maintain friendly and cordial relations with Malawi. Sweden was represented at the independence celebrations in Malawi by Ambassador Dag Malm from Léopoldville, in his capacity as ambassadeur en mission spéciale (ambassador on a special mission).

In January 1967, the Swedish parliament decided to establish an embassy in Lusaka, Zambia, a matter that had been under consideration since Zambia's independence in 1964. Olof Kaijser was appointed as the first resident ambassador, and in May 1968, he also became the first Swedish ambassador to be accredited in Malawi's capital, Zomba. The ambassador in Lusaka was accredited in Zomba until 1974, and thereafter in Lilongwe, which became Malawi's capital that same year. In 2001, the dual accreditation to Lilongwe was transferred to the Swedish ambassador in Harare, Zimbabwe.

== List of representatives ==
Name	Period	Title	Residence/concurrent accreditation	Notes	Presented credentials	Ref
Olof Kaijser	May 1968 – 1972	Ambassador	Resident in Lusaka			
Iwo Dölling	1972–1975	Ambassador	Resident in Lusaka	In Zomba until 1974 and in Lilongwe from 1974.		
Ove Heyman	1976–1979	Ambassador	Resident in Lusaka			
Göran Hasselmark	1979–1983	Ambassador	Resident in Lusaka			
Jan Ölander	1984–1987	Ambassador	Resident in Lusaka			
Carl Johan Persson	1987–1990	Ambassador	Resident in Lusaka			
Per Taxell	1990–1993	Ambassador	Resident in Lusaka			
Anders Johnson	1994–1996	Ambassador	Resident in Lusaka			
Kristina Svensson	1997–2001	Ambassador	Resident in Lusaka			
Kristina Svensson	2001–2005	Ambassador	Resident in Harare			
Sten Rylander	2006–2010	Ambassador	Resident in Harare			
Anders Lidén	2010–2012	Ambassador	Resident in Harare			
Lars Ronnås	2012–2016	Ambassador	Resident in Harare		30 April 2013	
Sofia Calltorp	September 2016 – 2019	Ambassador	Resident in Harare		11 May 2018	
Åsa Pehrson	1 September 2019 – 2023	Ambassador	Resident in Harare			
Per Lindgärde	August 2023 – present	Ambassador	Resident in Harare			
