= Oh Man =

Oh Man or O Man may refer to:

- A phrase used to express disappointment or annoyance

== Music ==
- "Oh Man", a 1987 Harry Chapin song from the album Remember When the Music
- "Oh Man", a 2009 Grandmaster Flash song from the album The Bridge (Concept of a Culture)
- "Oh Man", a 2010 Born Ruffians song from the album Say It
- "Oh Man", a 2010 Dr. Dog song from the album Shame, Shame
- "Oh Man", a 2018 Jain song from the album Souldier
- "Oh Man", a 2020 single by Amanda Blank
- "Oh Man", a 2025 Justin Bieber song from the album Swag II

== Other uses ==
- Oh Man, a trail at Bishop Peak in California
- Oh Man!, a 2001 film by Gauri Shinde
- Oh Man, a 2018 art project by Hetain Patel
- Ô Man, another name for the Mantsi language
- O'Man, the third golf hole at Whistling Straits in Wisconsin

== See also ==
- Oman, a country on the Arabian peninsula
- Ohman, a surname
