= Arne Kaijser =

Swedish academic (born 1950)

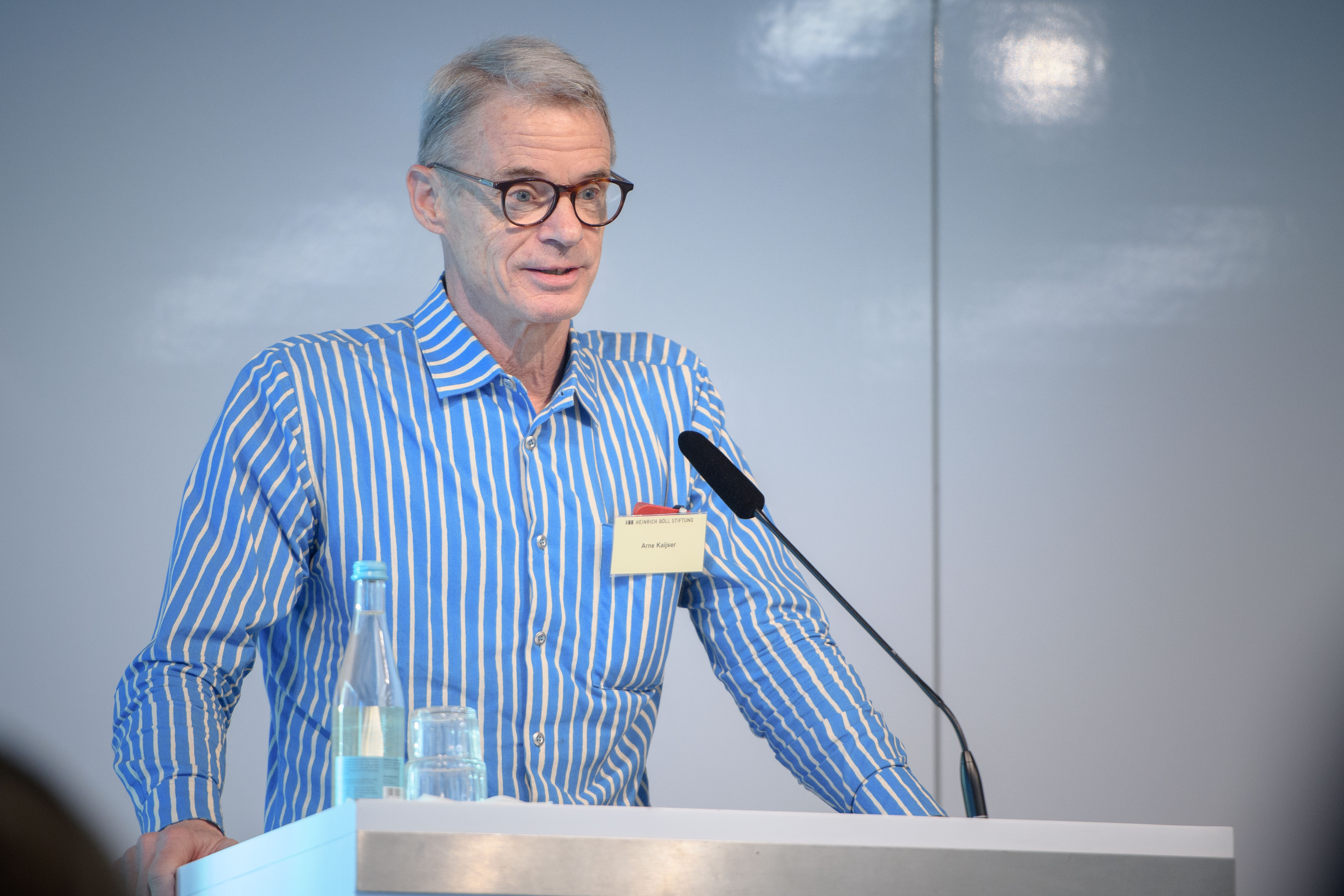
- Kaijser in 2016
- Born: Rolf Arne Kaijser; 5 February 1950 (age 76)
- Occupation: Professor
- Father: Olof Kaijser

Rolf Arne Kaijser (born 5 February 1950) is a professor emeritus of history of technology at the KTH Royal Institute of Technology in Stockholm, and a former president of the Society for the History of Technology.

Kaijser has published two books in Swedish: Stadens ljus. Etableringen av de första svenska gasverken and I fädrens spår. Den svenska infrastrukturens historiska utveckling och framtida utmaningar, and has co-edited several anthologies. Kaijser is a member of the Royal Swedish Academy of Engineering Sciences since 2007 and also a member of the editorial board of two scientific journals: Journal of Urban Technology and Centaurus. Lately, he has been occupied with the history of Large Technical Systems.
