= Agda Rössel =

Swedish politician and diplomat

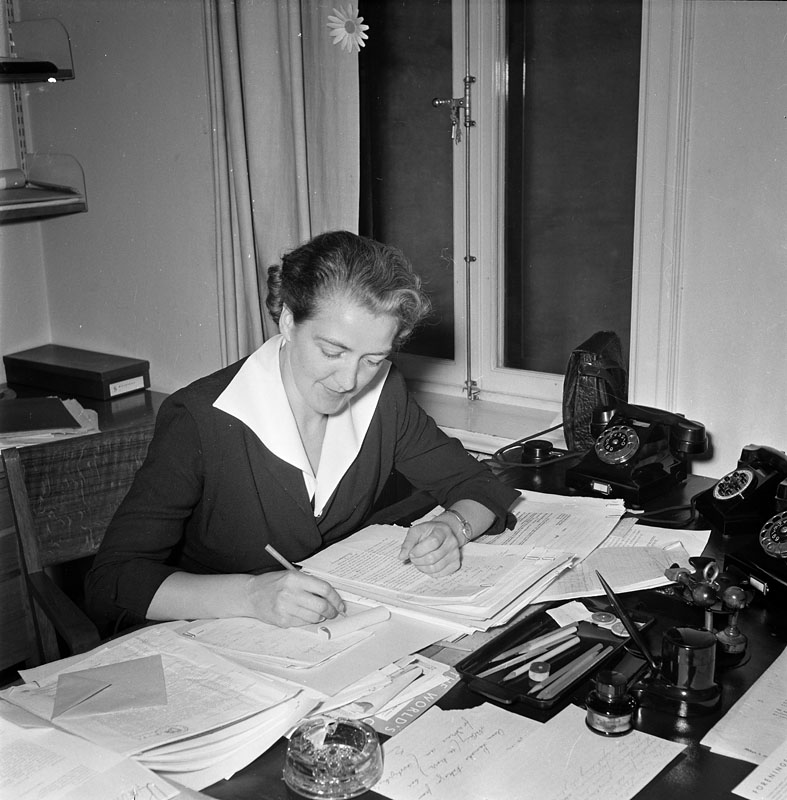
- Born: Agda Viola Jäderström; 4 November 1910; Gällivare, Sweden
- Died: 27 May 2001 (aged 90); Stockholm, Sweden
- Occupation(s): Politician, diplomat
- Years active: 1939–1981
- Known for: Work in UN
- Notable work: Permanent Representative of Sweden to the United Nations
- Spouse: James Rössel (m. 1943–1951)
- Children: 2

Agda Viola Rössel, née Jäderström (4 November 1910 – 27 May 2001) was a Swedish politician (Social Democrat) and diplomat. She was appointed Permanent Representative of Sweden to the United Nations in 1958 and was as the first of her gender to have been permanently placed in that position among the 60 UN ambassadors that year in the United Nations organisation; she served in that position till 1964. After this assignment she was Sweden's Ambassador to many countries such as Yugoslavia, Czechoslovakia, and Greece.

== Early life ==
Agda Rössel née Jäderström was born in Gällivare, Norrbotten, Sweden on 4 November 1910; Gällivare is a small town engaged in mining to in the far north of Sweden to the north of the Arctic Circle. Her father was a railway employee. She was the fourth child in family of six children. She was keen in studies. She attended schools in Gällivare and in Malmberget. Even though she wanted to train as a doctor, due to her mother's illness and financial problems her studies were disrupted for many years as she had to tend a family of seven people. After her mother recovered she continued her studies in Stockholm on the subject of social studies. She also pursued a technical course concurrently working a welfare department in large jail where she learned psychiatry.

== Career ==
=== Early career ===
After passing out from the technical school in 1939 she chose a career related to trade unions and she worked for a Stockholm Hotel Group in their personnel department and then in a telephone company as Ombudsman. During the later part of the war years she worked as emergency response adviser in Stockholm working Board. She got married in 1943 to James Rössel, a Swedish journalist. She became a member of the board of Swedish Confederation of Professional Employees (TCO's Board). With help provided by to female friends like Alva Myrdal (Swedish Social Democratic Party) and Ulla Lindström (journalist and politician) and with media publicity, in 1948, she became President of the Professional women's associations and Cooperation. With rising popularity she became she vice president of International Federation of Business and Professional Women, in place of Alva Myrdal.

During World War II Rössel was head of the Save the Children Federation. In 1951, she was appointed by the Government of Sweden as the Swedish delegate to the United Nations Commission on Human Rights.

In 1956, she had stated: "We business and professional women, conscious of our increased responsibilities towards mankind in the light of this new [atomic] power, accept the challenge of it and make it our own".

=== UN Ambassador ===
In 1958 Sweden appointed her as its Permanent Representative to the United Nations (in place of Gunnar Jarring) and she was the first female to hold that post in the UN body which then consisted of 60 ambassadors from various countries. She presented her credentials on 8 August 1958; Östen Undén chose her for the post though she was not a professional diplomat. She served in that post till 1964. She was succeeded by Sverker Åström. During this tenure she also served on the United Nations Security Council. During the UN posting she campaigned for global moratorium or abolition of death penalty and female circumcision.

=== Ambassador ===
After this assignment, she served at Belgrade as Ambassador to Bulgaria and Yugoslavia (at Prague) from 1964 to 1969, Ambassador to Czechoslovakia during 1969 to 1973, and to Greece (posted in Athens) from 1973 to 1976.

Rössel was also associated with a classified report she had written in 1968 which played a part in a scandal that involved Sven Wedén, known as the Wedénaffären; this report was de-classified and released to the public in 1994 by then-Prime Minister Carl Bildt.

== Personal life ==
She was married between 1943 and 1951 to James Rössel. Rössel died at the age of 90, in May 2001.

== Bibliography ==
- Rössel, Agda (1956). Kvinnoarbetet i Sverige (in Swedish). [Sverige: YSF]. SELIBR 13588489.

Diplomatic posts
Preceded by Gunnar Jarring	Permanent Representative to the United Nations; 1958–1964	Succeeded by Sverker Åström
Preceded by Sven Backlund	Ambassador of Sweden to Yugoslavia; 1964–1969	Succeeded by Lennart Finnmark
Preceded by Harry Bagge	Ambassador of Sweden to Czechoslovakia; 1969–1973	Succeeded by Carl-George Crafoord
Preceded by Dag Bergman	Ambassador of Sweden to Greece; 1973–1976	Succeeded by Ivar Öhman
