= Samuel Fröler =

Swedish actor

- Born: Per Samuel Fröler; 24 March 1957 (age 68); Nybro, Sweden
- Occupation: Actor
- Years active: 1985–present

Per Samuel Fröler (born 24 March 1957) is a Swedish actor. His break-through was in the TV series Tre Kärlekar in 1989. He played the protagonist in the drama series Skärgårdsdoktorn, and has also acted in several films. At the 28th Guldbagge Awards he was nominated for the Best Actor award for his role in The Best Intentions.

Fröler did the voice of Shrek when Shrek 2 was dubbed into Swedish. He also had a part in the American film Octane in 2003. He played one of the leading roles in the 2010 film Pure.
