= Olof Kaijser =

Swedish diplomat (1914–2002)

- Born: Olof Ragnar Kaijser; 28 December 1914; Härnösand, Sweden
- Died: 15 November 2002 (aged 87); Stockholm, Sweden
- Education: Uppsala University
- Occupation: Diplomat
- Years active: 1939–1980
- Spouse: Villemo Lindeberg (m. 1939; died 1982)
- Children: 5, including Arne Kaijser
- Relatives: Östen and Torsten (cousins)

Olof Ragnar Kaijser (28 December 1914 – 15 November 2002) was a Swedish diplomat who joined the Ministry for Foreign Affairs in 1939. He served at Swedish missions in Hamburg, Oslo, Helsinki, New York City, Ankara, and The Hague, and held senior positions at the Foreign Ministry from 1959 to 1963. He subsequently served as ambassador in Wellington (1963–1967), Lusaka (1967–1972), and Reykjavík (1972–1978), and was the first resident Swedish ambassador to Zambia and the first Swedish ambassador accredited to Malawi. From 1978 to 1980, he headed the Ministry's B Department.

== Early life ==
Kaijser was born on 28 December 1914 in Härnösand, Sweden, the son of the physician and politician Fritz Kaijser (1868–1960) and his wife, Anna Lovén (1870–1947), Licentiate of Medicine. His mother was a physician and the first woman with children to graduate from a medical school in Sweden. Olof Kaijser was the youngest of six siblings: Helena Johanna Kaijser (1898–1907), company manager Christian Kaijser (1900–1962), physician and politician Rolf Kaijser (1903–1980), lawyer Fritz Kaijser (1908–1983), and director Erland Kaijser (1910–1976).

His paternal uncle was pharmacist Arthur Kaijser (1850–1915). His maternal grandfather was physician Christian Lovén (1835–1904), and his maternal great-grandfather was civil servant and politician Lars Johan Lovén (1795–1884). He was a cousin of Foreign Minister Östen Undén (1886–1974) and his brother, Envoy Torsten Undén (1877–1962).

Kaijser graduated from upper secondary school in 1932, received a Bachelor of Arts degree from Uppsala University in 1937, and a Candidate of Law degree in 1939.

== Career ==
Kaijser joined the Ministry for Foreign Affairs as an attaché in 1939. He served in Hamburg in 1940, Oslo in 1941, and Helsinki in 1944. In 1945, he was appointed second vice consul in New York City. He became first secretary at the Ministry for Foreign Affairs in 1949, having previously served as second secretary from 1948, and was appointed first legation secretary in Ankara in 1952. While serving in Turkey, he was involved, among other matters, in handling the aftermath of the collision between the Swedish vessel MS Naboland and the Turkish submarine TCG Dumlupınar off Çanakkale in April 1953.

In 1954, Kaijser was appointed first legation secretary in The Hague. He became acting director (byråchef) at the Ministry for Foreign Affairs in 1959 and permanent director in 1961, a position he held until 1963. He was then appointed envoy in Wellington in 1963 and became ambassador there in 1964, serving until 1967. From 1967 to 1972, he was ambassador in Lusaka. Kaijser was appointed the first resident Swedish ambassador in Zambia, and in 1968 he also became the first Swedish ambassador accredited to Malawi, with the capital at Zomba.

From 1972 to 1978, Kaijser served as ambassador in Reykjavik. He subsequently headed the Ministry for Foreign Affairs' B Department from 1978 to 1980. In December 1980, he was elected to the board of the Sweden–Iceland Society. In August 1981, he was elected to the board of the Lovén Family Association (Lovénska släktföreningen).

== Personal life ==
In 1939, Kaijser married Villemo Lindeberg (1916–1982), the daughter of clergyman, author, and school teacher Giovanni Lindeberg and Gunhild (née Odhner). They had five children: Sten (born 1940), Thomas (born 1942), Johan Gustaf (1944–1945), Eva (born 1948), and Professor Arne Kaijser (born 1950).

After leaving Iceland in 1978 and spending a year in Stockholm, the Kaijsers settled in Villemo's childhood home region of Malexander in Östergötland.

== Death ==
Kaijser died on 15 November 2002 in Västerled Parish, Stockholm, Sweden.

== Awards and decorations ==
- (Sweden) Knight of the Order of the Polar Star (1963)
- (Iceland) Grand Cross of the Order of the Falcon (10 June 1975)

Diplomatic posts
Preceded by Olof Ripa	Envoy/Ambassador of Sweden to New Zealand; 1963–1967	Succeeded by Karl Henrik Andersson
Preceded by Carl Gustaf Béve	Ambassador of Sweden to Zambia; 1967–1972	Succeeded by Iwo Dölling
Preceded by None	Ambassador of Sweden to Malawi; 1968–1972	Succeeded by Iwo Dölling
Preceded by Gunnar Granberg	Ambassador of Sweden to Iceland; 1972–1978	Succeeded by Ethel Wiklund
