= Zomba =

Zomba may refer to:

== Places ==
=== Hungary ===
- Zomba, Hungary, village

=== Malawi ===
- Zomba, Malawi, city
- Zomba District
- Zomba Massif, mountain
- Roman Catholic Diocese of Zomba
- Zomba (meteorite), see Meteorite fall

== Other ==
- 1468 Zomba, an asteroid
- Zomba Group of Companies, a UK and American music group founded in 1975
  - List of Zomba Group companies
- Chaerocina zomba, a species of moth
