= Swedish Greeks =

Ethnic group in Sweden

Swedish Greeks Svenskgreker Έλληνες της Σουηδίας
Total population
- 34,362; 0.37% of the Swedish population (2020)

Regions with significant populations
- Stockholm, Gothenburg, Malmö

Languages
- Greek and Swedish

Religion
- Greek Orthodox Church

Related ethnic groups
- Greek diaspora

The Greeks in Sweden constitute people of Greek nationality who have settled in Sweden, as well as Swedish people and Swedish residents of Greek heritage.

As of January 2020, there were 19,547 people born in Greece living in Sweden, as well as 14,807 people born in Sweden with at least one parent born in Greece. They are located mostly in the southern part of Sweden, especially around Stockholm.

== Notable people ==
- Steve Angello – DJ, producer, and music label owner
- Mikkey Dee – drummer and songwriter for Motörhead
- Theodor Kallifatides – writer
- Kim Cesarion – singer
- Elena Paparizou – singer
- Apollo Papathanasio – singer
- Alexandra Pascalidou – journalist, TV host, and author
- Vasilis Papageorgiou – author, translator, university professor
- Babis Stefanidis – football player and manager
- Panajotis Dimitriadis – football player
- Elli AvrRam – Bollywood Actress
- Sotirios Papagiannopoulos – football player
- Sotiris Delis – politician, Member of the Riksdag since 2014
- Dimitri Stassos – songwriter, particularly for the Eurovision Song Contest
- Nino (Greek singer) – half Swedish male singer from Swedish mother and Greek father
- Antique (band) Swedish band, member born and raised in Sweden Nikos Panagiotidis – singer and musician (bouzouki)
- Alex P – Greek Swedish songwriter and music producer

== See also ==
- Greece–Sweden relations
- Greek diaspora
- Immigration to Sweden
