= Erik Bergman (Lutheran minister) =

Swedish parish minister (1886–1970)

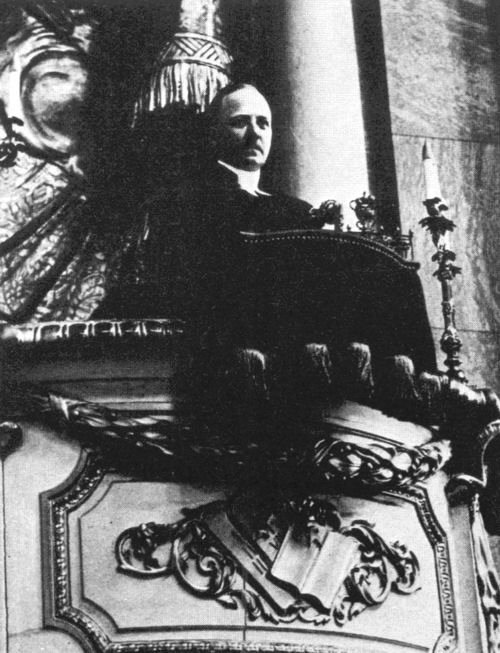
- Erik Bergman pictured at Hedvig Eleonora Church in Stockholm
- Born: Erik Henrik Fredrik Bergman; 22 October 1886; Mörbylånga, Kalmar County, Sweden
- Died: 26 April 1970 (aged 83); Stockholm, Sweden
- Spouse: Karin Åkerblom
- Children: Dag Bergman (1914–1984); Ingmar Bergman (1918–2007); Margareta Bergman (1922–2006)

Erik Henrik Fredrik Bergman (22 October 1886 – 26 April 1970) was a Swedish parish minister of the Lutheran Church and the father of diplomat Dag Bergman, novelist Margareta Bergman, and film director Ingmar Bergman.

== Life ==
Erik Bergman was born at Mörbylånga in Kalmar County on 22 October 1886. He was ordained to the Swedish State Church in Uppsala in 1912 and served as a priest in Valbo as of 1913. In 1918 he was relocated to Stockholm and served as a minister at Hedvig Eleonora Church, where he became the parish vicar of Hedvig Eleonora Parish in 1934. In this capacity, he served as a royal chaplain to the court of King Gustav V of Sweden.

He was married to nurse Karin Åkerblom, his second cousin. Bergman wrote an autobiography for his daughter Margareta in 1941. Ingmar Bergman later consulted it to write the semi-biographical script about his parents' complex courtship in The Best Intentions (1991), a story that includes the unhappy early years of their marriage up to the point where the mother is pregnant with her second son, effectively Ingmar himself. Erik Bergman was a rather strict father and his complex relationship with his son is a somber theme in Ingmar Bergman films, such as Fanny and Alexander (1982). He was further portrayed in cinema with Sunday's Children, directed by Daniel Bergman and released in 1992. Whereas Ingmar's recollections of Erik Bergman are damning in Fanny and Alexander, his study of his father is "far more forgiving" in The Best Intentions and Sunday's Children.

Erik Bergman died in Stockholm on 26 April 1970.
