= List of ambassadors of Sweden to Zambia =

Ambassador of Sweden to Zambia
- Lesser coat of arms of the Kingdom of Sweden
- Incumbent; Per-Ola Mattsson since August 2026
- Ministry for Foreign Affairs; Swedish Embassy, Lusaka
- Style: His or Her Excellency (formal); Mr. or Madam Ambassador (informal)
- Reports to: Minister for Foreign Affairs
- Seat: Lusaka, Zambia
- Appointer: Government of Sweden
- Term length: No fixed term
- Inaugural holder: Otto Rathsman
- Formation: 27 November 1964
- Website: Swedish Embassy, Lusaka

The Ambassador of Sweden to Zambia (known formally as the Ambassador of the Kingdom of Sweden to the Republic of Zambia) is the official representative of the government of Sweden to the president of Zambia and government of Zambia.

== History ==
On the occasion of the proclamation of Zambia's independence on 24 October 1964, Swedish prime minister Tage Erlander stated in a congratulatory telegram to President Kenneth Kaunda that the Swedish government recognized Zambia as a sovereign and independent state and expressed the Swedish government's desire to maintain friendly and cordial relations with Zambia. Sweden was represented at the independence celebrations in Zambia by Ambassador Otto Rathsman from Nairobi. In the council on 27 November 1964, Ambassador Otto Rathsman in Nairobi was appointed as ambassador to Lusaka as well. He thus became the first Swedish ambassador to be accredited in Lusaka.

In January 1967, the Swedish parliament decided to establish an embassy in Lusaka, a matter that had been under consideration since Zambia's independence in 1964. Olof Kaijser was appointed as the first resident ambassador, and in 1968, he also became the first Swedish ambassador to be accredited in Malawi's capital, Zomba. The ambassador in Lusaka was accredited in Zomba until 1974, and thereafter in Lilongwe, which became Malawi's capital that same year. In 2001, the dual accreditation to Lilongwe was transferred to the Swedish ambassador in Harare.

== List of representatives ==
Name	Period	Title	Notes	Ref
Otto Rathsman	27 November 1964 – 1966	Ambassador	Resident in Nairobi.	
Carl Gustaf Béve	1966–1967	Ambassador	Resident in Nairobi.	
Olof Kaijser	1967–1972	Ambassador	Accredited to Zomba (from 1968).	
Iwo Dölling	1972–1975	Ambassador	Accredited to Gaborone (from 1974), Lilongwe (from 1974), and Zomba (until 1974).	
Ove Heyman	1975–1979	Ambassador	Accredited to Gaborone (from 1976) and Lilongwe (from 1976).	
Göran Hasselmark	1979–1983	Ambassador	Accredited to Lilongwe.	
Jan Ölander	1984–1987	Ambassador	Accredited to Lilongwe.	
Carl Johan Persson	1987–1990	Ambassador	Accredited to Lilongwe.	
Per Taxell	1990–1993	Ambassador	Accredited to Lilongwe.	
Anders Johnson	1994–1996	Ambassador	Accredited to Lilongwe.	
Christer Ågren	1996–1996	Chargé d'affaires		
Kristina Svensson	1997–2001	Ambassador	Accredited to Lilongwe.	
Christina Rehlen	2001–2006	Ambassador		
Lars Ronnås	2006–2009	Ambassador		
Marie Andersson de Frutos	2009–2011	Ambassador		
Lena Nordström	2011–2015	Ambassador		
Henrik Cederin	2015–2019	Ambassador		
Anna Maj Hultgård	1 September 2019 – 2022	Ambassador		
Johan Hallenborg	September 2022 – 2026	Ambassador		
Per-Ola Mattsson	August 2026 – present	Ambassador		
