= Iwo Dölling =

Swedish diplomat (1923–2019)

- Born: Fritz Dölling; 12 January 1923; Vaxholm, Sweden
- Died: 22 April 2019 (aged 96); Lidingö, Sweden
- Resting place: Norra begravningsplatsen
- Education: Stockholm University College
- Occupation: Diplomat
- Years active: 1949–1993
- Spouse: Tatiana Dushmanitch (m. 1950)
- Children: 4

Fritz "Iwo" Dölling (12 January 1923 – 22 April 2019) was a Swedish diplomat whose career in the Ministry for Foreign Affairs spanned more than three decades. After joining the ministry in 1949, he served in Paris, Bonn, Pretoria, London, Brussels, and Kenya, where he worked as a United Nations trade policy adviser. He later served as Sweden's ambassador to Zambia, Israel, and Greece, and was a member of the Swedish delegation to the United Nations in 1979. From 1986 to 1993, Dölling was a counselor at Atlas Copco, advising the company on international political and trade issues, including its operations in South Africa during the apartheid era.

== Early life ==
Dölling was born on 12 January 1923 in Vaxholm, Sweden, the son of Major Fritz Dölling and Margit (née Zander). He passed studentexamen in Gothenburg in 1942, and became a reserve officer in 1944. Dölling received a Candidate of Law degree from Stockholm University College in 1949.

== Career ==
Dölling was employed as an attaché at the Ministry for Foreign Affairs in 1949. He served as an attaché and secretary with the Swedish OEEC delegation in Paris from 1950 to 1955, followed by postings as secretary at the Swedish embassy in Bonn from 1955 to 1957 and at the legation in Pretoria from 1957 to 1960. From 1960 to 1963, he was first secretary at the Ministry for Foreign Affairs, before serving as commercial counsellor in London from 1963 to 1964. He then worked as a UN trade policy advisor in Kenya from 1964 to 1965, after which he became embassy counsellor and deputy head of the Swedish EEC delegation in Brussels from 1965 to 1970. He was appointed minister in Brussels from 1970 to 1972.

Dölling was Swedish ambassador to Lusaka from 1972 to 1975, with concurrent accreditations to Zomba (1972–1974), Gaborone (1974–1975), and Lilongwe (1974–1975). He later served as ambassador in Tel Aviv from 1975 to 1979, was a member of the Swedish delegation to the United Nations in 1979, and then served as ambassador in Athens from 1980 to 1985. From 1986 to 1993, he was a counselor at Atlas Copco.

At Atlas Copco, Dölling was responsible for managing the company's relations with South Africa during the apartheid era. His role involved advising on trade and political issues and helping the company navigate a complex environment shaped by international sanctions, legal considerations, commercial interests, financial factors, and ethical concerns. He also monitored political and economic developments in South Africa and other challenging international markets, providing analysis and strategic advice based on his regional expertise and international experience.

== Personal life ==
In 1950, Dölling married Tatiana Dushmanitch (1924–2019), daughter of Colonel Vladimir Dushmanitch and Constance Rowan. They had four children: Fritzika (born 1950), Fredrik (born 1952), Dan (born 1953), and Jessica (born 1960).

== Death ==
Dölling died on 22 April 2019 in Lidingö. He was interred on 17 September 2019 in the Dölling family grave at Norra begravningsplatsen.

== Awards and decorations ==
- (Sweden) For Zealous and Devoted Service of the Realm (22 August 1979)
- (Sweden) Knight of the Order of the Polar Star (1967)

Diplomatic posts
Preceded by Olof Kaijser	Ambassador of Sweden to Zambia; 1972–1975	Succeeded by Ove Heyman
Preceded by Olof Kaijser	Ambassador of Sweden to Malawi; 1972–1975	Succeeded by Ove Heyman
Preceded by Carl Johan Rappe	Ambassador of Sweden to Botswana; 1974–1975	Succeeded by Ove Heyman
Preceded by Sten Sundfeldt	Ambassador of Sweden to Israel; 1975–1979	Succeeded by Torsten Örn
Preceded by Ivar Öhman	Ambassador of Sweden to Greece; 1980–1985	Succeeded by Hans Colliander
