= Ingrid Dahlberg =

Swedish politician and theatre manager

Ingrid Dahlberg (born 1941) is a former theatre manager and president of the Swedish Royal Dramatic Theatre, from 1997 to 2002, and governor of Dalarna County from 2002 to 2006. She is a member of the Board of the Swedish National Agency for Higher Education, and a member of the Honorary Board of the Gothenburg Film Festival, and was a participant in the Tällberg Forum 2005.

Dahlberg studied at Barlock's School of Commerce and Lindenwood College in the United States. In 1963 she started work at Sveriges Radio and TV, first on the general news desk, then on the editorial staff of TV2 and from 1983 in various capacities for TV1. She was named 'Executive of the Year' in 2001 by the magazine Affärsvärlden.

== Writings ==
- Dansen kring guldkalven (with Ragnar Boman) (1975)
- Resan till Pjongjang, staged by Stockholm City Theatre in 1975
- Studenten (TV drama, 1981)
