= List of Zomba Group companies =

A list of any companies (labels, imprints, distributors, production, etc.) that have been associated at one point or another with the Zomba Group. Included, if known, is a brief description and the period with which they were associated with Zomba.

== A ==
- Advanced - German label acquired with Rough Trade GSA in 1996.
- Air - German label acquired with Rough Trade GSA in 1996.
- Arista Records - Zomba's first distributor, from 1981 until 1987.
- Associated Production Music (APM) - Production music library and music services company. Was initially a joint venture between Zomba/Jive and EMI. Still Currently operating under unknown ownership.
- Avex Distribution Japanese distributor of Zomba products in the early 2000s.

== B ==
- Battery Records - Founded in 2008, a hip-hop imprint started by Neil Levine.
- Battery Records - Unrelated to the current Battery Records, this was a dance label active in the nineties under Jive Records.
- Battery Studios - Collection of studios owned by Zomba Recording Corporation. A one-point, there were a total of six locations in London, four in New York City, two in Nashville and one in Chicago. Most have closed, leaving only a New York location.
- Benson Music Group - Christian themed music group purchased in 1997. The publishing arm was a significant addition to Zomba, having been active since 1902. It was closed down in late 2001.
- Benson Records - Record label under the Benson Music Group, purchased by Zomba in 1997.
- Brentwood Music Group - Christian themed label purchased in February 1994, and moved under the Provident Label Group in 1997. Shut down in 2001.
- Brentwood/Benson Publishing Group - The publishing arm of the Provident Music Group created out of the Brentwood and Benson publishing divisions purchased in 1994 and 1997 respectively. After BMG purchased Zomba in 2002, BMG sold the group to Universal.
- Bruton Music - First acquired as part of the Bruton Music Group. Later placed under Zomba Production Music.
- Bruton Music Group - UK based company formed in 1977 and purchased by Zomba in 1985. The company has labels that release music from composers, holds a music library and was active in the film and television "jingles" market.
- Bruton Music Library - Music library associated with the music group of the same name.
- Bertelsmann Music Group (BMG) - Zomba's first deal with BMG was for distribution. BMG had recently purchased Zomba distributor RCA, so BMG continued. In 1991, BMG purchased 25% of Zomba Music Holdings BV and in 1996 20% of Zomba Record Holdings BV. Part of the 1996 deal was a put option that made BMG legally required to buy the rest of Zomba before a certain date, if Zomba's owners wanted that. Clive Calder enacted on the put option in mid-2002, and by the end of the year, owner ship of the two holding companies went to BMG.

== C ==
- Chappell Recording Music Library - Part of Zomba Production Music.
- Cheiron Studios - Swedish studio and production team. From 1996 until its closure in 2000 it shared a joint production and publishing venture with the Zomba Group.
- Collins Classics - Classical label acquired in 1996 as part of the Windsong deal. Closed in 1998.
- Conifer Records - Classical label formed in 1977, purchased by Zomba in 1992 and sold to BMG in 1996.
- Connect 2 Music - Part of Zomba Production Music.
- Connoisseur Collection - Mid-priced compilation label acquired in 1996 as part of the Windsong deal.
- Coombe International Music Ltd. - ??
- Cross-Over Recordings - See X-Over Recordings.

== D ==
- Dance Jive - Dance label formed by Jive and active in the early 2000s.
- Diadem Music Group - Christian themed group acquired with Benson. Part of the Provident Label Group.
- Dreamhire Professional Audio Rentals - An equipment rental service opened in 1984 with operations in London, New York City and Nashville. The London branch closed in 2001 followed by Nashville in 2003. Since November 2003 following the BMG purchase, Dreamhire is no longer a part of Zomba and runs independently as Dreamhire LLC from one location in New York City, now owned by Chris Dunn, ex-bass guitarist with City Boy who originally set up the company whilst managing Battery Studios for Zomba.

== E ==
- EBUL - Record label owned by Pete Waterman Ltd. and Jive Records.
- Essential Records - Christian themed label acquired with Brentwood. Part of the Provident Label Group.
- EMI - Owner of Zomba distributor Virgin Records. EMI also tried to purchase Zomba in 1990.

== F ==
- F. Hammond Music - Formed by Zomba and Fred Hammond under Zomba Gospel LLC.
- Firstcom Music Inc. - Part of Zomba Production Music.
- Fo Yo Soul Entertainment - Formed by Zomba and Kirk Franklin under Zomba Gospel LLC.
- Form & Function - German label acquired with Rough Trade GSA in 1996.

== G ==
- Galerie - Part of Zomba Production Music.
- Grever Family - Zomba acquired publishing interests from this Mexican company in 1995.
- Grever International S.A. - Publishing group purchased by Zomba from the Grever family in 1995.
- Golden Sands Enterprises, Inc. - Publishing group purchased by Zomba from the Grever family in 1995. Renamed Zomba Golden Sands Enterprises, Inc.
- GospoCentric - Gospel label purchased in 2004.

== H ==
- Hilton Sound - A hire operation purchased by Zomba in 1996 and moved under Dreamhire.
- Hitz Committee Entertainment - Joint-venture run by Jive and Jive A&R VP Micky "MeMpHiTz" Wright in 2008. It consists of a record label (under Sony), music production, music publishing, artist and producer management, and TV and film projects.

== I ==
- Ingenuity Entertainment - A full-service management company for artists, composers, music editors and music supervisors in the film and television industries formed in May 2001.
- Internal Affairs - Label active during the early and mid nineties.

== J ==
- Jive Afrika - Created in 1984 for release of South African material (most prominently, Hugh Masekela). Inactive since the mid to late eighties.
- Jive Electro - Founded 1985, focusing on electronic music. Active from 1985 to 1987, and resurrected in 1999 until BMG integrated Zomba in mid-2003.
- Jive House - Short-lived house label formed in the mid-nineties by Jive Records.
- Jive Records - Founded in 1981, focusing on hip-hop and R&B music.
- Jive Label Group - When BMG sold its half of the Sony BMG merger back to Sony in late 2008, Zomba Label Group began to be rebranded as Jive Label Group.

== L ==
- LaCarr Music Production AB - Swedish production team formed by songwriter Douglas Carr and artist manager Lasse Karlsson in 1999. Zomba Music Publishers signed a deal with them in 2000.
- LaFace Records - Reactivated by BMG for the Zomba Label Group in 2004.

== M ==
- Mojo Records - Acquired from Universal in 2001.
- Music For Nations - Metal/hard-rock label acquired in 1996 as part of the Windsong deal. Closed in 2004.

== N ==
- New Life Records - Formed by Zomba and John P. Kee under Zomba Gospel.

== O ==
- Our Choice - German label acquired with Rough Trade GSA in 1996.

== P ==
- Pepper Records - Formed in the late nineties by Jive Records.
- Pinnacle Entertainment - Entertainment group purchased by Zomba with the Windsong Holdings deal.
- Portman Music Services Ltd - A joint company set up with Portman Entertainment in 1993.
- Provident Label Group - The label group under the Provident Music Group.
- Provident Music Group - Christian label group created by Zomba in 1997.
- Provident-Integrity Distribution - The distribution arm of the Provident Music Group.

== Q ==
- Quiet Water Entertainment - Formed by Zomba and Donald Lawrence under Zomba Gospel and currently under Verity Gospel Music Group.

== R ==
- RCA Records - Zomba's distributor between 1987 and 1991. RCA was eventually purchased by BMG, who became Zomba's distributor.
- Reihe Ego - German label acquired with Rough Trade GSA in 1996.
- Reunion Records - Christian themed label acquired from BMG in October 1996 and put under the Provident Label Group in 1997.
- Rock Records - Korean distributor for Zomba products in the early 2000s.
- Rode Dog Records - Christian themed label acquired with Reunion Records in October 1996 and put under the Provident Label Group in 1997.
- Rough Trade - The imprint from Rough Trade GSA, used after Zomba renamed the company to Zomba Records GmbG in 1999.
- Rough Trade Germany/Switzerland/Austria (GSA) - GSA division of the label group and distributor, 80% of which was purchased by Zomba as part of the Windsong Holdings deal. Renamed Zomba Records GmbH effective June 8, 1999.
- Rough Trade Benelux - Benelux division of the distributor purchased by Zomba as part of the Windsong Holdings deal.

== S ==
- Sanctuary Records - Zomba briefly co-owned this company between 1989 and 1991. The two companies continued dealing together in various capacities, including a publishing deal with Sanctuary artists Iron Maiden.
- SEE Music - Service formed in 2005 by Zomba with BMG and First Com Music to offer music specifically for motion picture advertising.
- Segue Music Inc. - Originally called La Da Music, Zomba purchased Segue in 1995. Segue provided music editing services for film scores and TV, music supervisions, temp tracks, prerecords, production and consulting. It was integrated into Zomba! Music Services.
- Silvertone Records - Founded by Zomba in 1988, focusing on rock and blues.
- So So Def - Record label run by Jermaine Dupri. So So Def was briefly moved under Zomba in 2005. Dupri moved to Virgin, and then Island (taking his label with him) before returning to Zomba in early 2009.
- Som Livre - Brazilian distributor of Zomba products in the early 2000s. Owned by Sigla
- Sonopress - BMG affiliated manufacturing company and pressing plant.
- Sub•Lime Records - Christian themed label acquired with Brentwood. Part of the Provident Label Group.
- Summer Shore NV - Clive Calder's investment group that wholly owned the Zomba Group until December 2002. The company's inception and any other activities are unknown, but they were based in the Netherlands.

== T ==
- Trademark Records - Rock label formed under Zomba Australia in 1999.

== V ==
- Valentim de Carvalho - Zomba distributor in Portugal under EMI.
- Verity Gospel Music Group - This became the new name for Zomba Gospel in late 2007.
- Verity Records - Gospel label opened in 1994. Moved under the Provident Music Group in 1997 and now under Verity Gospel Music Group.
- Violator Records - Hip-hop label purchased by Jive in 2003.
- Virgin Records - Zomba's distributor in the late nineties in various European regions.
- Volcano Entertainment - Purchased in 1998, rock label primary reissuing older catalogs and the music of Tool, Survivor, 311 and "Weird Al" Yankovic.

== W ==
- Watershed Records - Christian themed label acquired with Brentwood. Part of the Provident Label Group.
- Windsong Exports - Company acquired in 1996 as part of the Windsong deal
- Windsong International - Primary company acquired in the Windsong Holdings purchase.
- Windsong In Concert - Windsong's label for its collection of "BBC In Concert" recordings. Largely inactive with Zomba.
- World Service - German label acquired with Rough Trade GSA in 1996.
- Worx Records - Formed by Jive in the mid nineties.

== X ==
- X-Over Recordings - Dance label formed under Zomba Australia in 1999. Also known as Cross-Over Recordings.

== Z ==
- Zed Beat - Short lived label from the early nineties releasing Bronski Beat music.
- Zomba Corporation - The first Zomba company. Registered in 1975 in Switzerland.
- Zomba Distribution - In 1999, Zomba combined the Rough Trade GSA and Rough Trade Benelux distribution arms to make Zomba Distribution, a division of Zomba Records GmbH.
- Zomba Enterprises Inc. - Currently the ASCAP affiliate of Zomba Music Publishers. It was originally the name of the primary music publishing company, before being replaced by Zomba Music Publishers Ltd. in 1994.
- Zomba Entertainment Holdings BV - Another Netherlands based holding company.
- Zomba Films - Film production company owned by Zomba.
- Zomba Golden Sands Enterprises, Inc. - Texas based publishing division of Zomba Enterprises Inc.
- Zomba Gospel LLC - Delaware based gospel label group formed in 2005 by BMG under the Zomba Label Group. The label was renamed Verity Gospel Music Group in late 2007.
- Zomba Group Records Division - The colloquial name for all of Zomba's records activities, though the legal existence of a company with this name is not known, it is used in industry literature when referring to label operations.
- Zomba International Records Group - London-based umbrella company created in mid-1999 for Zomba's international expansion. All of the international offices were closed down in 2003 when BMG integrated the company, so presumably this company's operations were folded into regular record label operations.
- Zomba Label Group - After BMG integrated the Zomba Group into its own operations in 2003, they created the Zomba Label Group to oversea the current Zomba labels. It is the current face of Zomba's label activities.
- Zomba Management - Zomba's primary management company, representing record producers and artists. Formed when Zomba Management and Publishers divided into two companies.
- Zomba Management and Publishers - The first Zomba company, created in 1975 in London. The company eventually split into Zomba Management and Zomba Enterprises Inc. after success with Mutt Lange.
- Zomba Melodies, Inc. - New York based publishing division of Zomba Enterprises Inc.
- Zomba Music Holdings BV - The holding company that contains the bulk of Zomba's written music publishing copyrights.
- Zomba Music Inc. - The BMI affiliate of Zomba Music Publishers.
- Zomba Music Publishers Ltd. - The main publishing division of the Zomba Group. Originally called Zomba Enterprises Inc. until 1994.
- Zomba Music Services - Sometimes Zomba! Music Services. Film and television music division formed in 1989 offering prerecorded music and publishing services for soundtracks, television and commercials.
- Zomba Production Music - UK based supplier of Library and Production Music intended for professional use and not released to the general public.
- Zomba Productions Ltd. - Zomba's original production company, later called Zomba Recording Corporation.
- Zomba Recording Corporation - The production company that coordinates activities on most Zomba releases. Previously called Zomba Productions Ltd.
- Zomba Recording Services Ltd.UK based company incorporated 1979-09-11.
- Zomba Recording LLC - US affiliate of Zomba Recording Corporation.
- Zomba Record Holdings BV - The holding company that contains the bulk of Zomba's recorded music copyrights.
- Zomba Records Asia-Pacific Regional Office Pte. Ltd. or Zomba Records (APRO) Pte. Ltd. - Asian-Pacific regional marketing and distribution office.
- Zomba Records Australia Pty. Ltd. - Regional marketing and distribution with offices in Melbourne and Sydney. Integrated into BMG's local office in mid-2003.
- Zomba Records Austria GmbH - Regional marketing and distribution office. Integrated into BMG's local office in mid-2003.
- Zomba Records Belgium - Regional marketing and distribution office opened in 2001. Integrated into BMG's local office in mid-2003.
- Zomba Records Benelux - Regional marketing and distribution office formed out of Rough Trade Benelux. Integrated into BMG's local office in mid-2003.
- Zomba Records Brazil - Regional marketing and distribution office located in Rio de Janeiro and opened July 1, 2001. Integrated into BMG's local office in mid-2003.
- Zomba Records Canada Inc. - Regional marketing and distribution office located in Toronto opened July 1, 1999. Integrated into BMG's local office in mid-2003.
- Zomba Records Denmark - Regional marketing and distribution office opened in 2000 and located in Copenhagen. Closed July 1, 2002.
- Zomba Records Espana SA - Regional marketing and distribution office located in Madrid and opened July 1, 2000. Integrated into BMG's local office in mid-2003.
- Zomba Records France - Regional marketing and distribution office opened October 1, 1999. Integrated into BMG's local office in mid-2003.
- Zomba Records GmbH - Regional marketing and distribution with offices in Cologne and Herne. Formed out of Rough Trade GSA. Integrated into BMG's local office in mid-2003.
- Zomba Records Italia S.r.l. - Regional marketing and distribution office located in Milan and opened July 1, 2000. Integrated into BMG's local office in mid-2003.
- Zomba Records Japan K.K. - Regional marketing and distribution office opened October 1, 2000. Integrated into BMG's local office in mid-2003.
- Zomba Records Korea Ltd. - Regional marketing and distribution office located in Seoul and opened July 1, 2000. Integrated into BMG's local office in mid-2003.
- Zomba Records Ltd. - Main records division located in London and the UK affiliate of Zomba Recording Corporation.
- Zomba Records New Zealand - Regional marketing and distribution office opened July 1, 2000. Integrated into BMG's local office in mid-2003.
- Zomba Records Norway - Regional marketing and distribution office located in Oslo and opened in 2000. Closed July 2, 2002.
- Zomba Records Portugal - Regional marketing and distribution office located in Lisbon and opened July 1, 2001. Integrated into BMG's local office in mid-2003.
- Zomba Records Scandinavia AB - Regional marketing and distribution office. Integrated into BMG's local office in mid-2003.
- Zomba Records Singapore - Regional marketing and distribution office located in Singapore and opened July 1, 1999 Integrated into BMG's local office in mid-2003.
- Zomba Records Sweden - Regional marketing and distribution office. Integrated into BMG's local office in mid-2003.
- Zomba Records Switzerland - Regional marketing and distribution office. Integrated into BMG's local office in mid-2003.
- Zomba Screen Music - A company representing film composers with a focus on career direction and management. Formed in 1997 and integrated into Ingenuity Entertainment in 2001.
- Zomba Silver Sands Enterprises, Inc. - Texas based publishing division of Zomba Enterprises Inc.
- Zomba Songs, Inc. - New York based publishing division of Zomba Enterprises Inc.
- Zomba Special Projects - Imprint established in 1997 for specific projects like releases sold through McDonald's restaurants.
- Zomba Ventures Inc. - Investment and financial services company based in the US.
- Zomba Video - Imprint used for music-related video releases.
