= Margareta Bergman =

Swedish novelist

- Dag, Margareta, and Ingmar Bergman as children
- Born: Karin Ann Margareta Bergman; 22 August 1922; Uppsala, Sweden
- Died: 27 September 2006 (aged 84)
- Occupation: Novelist
- Spouse: Paul Britten Austin
- Family: Erik Bergman (father); Ingmar Bergman (brother); Dag Bergman (brother)

Karin Ann Margareta Bergman (22 August 1922 – 27 September 2006) was a Swedish novelist. She had an unhappy childhood in a strict Lutheran family, something depicted in her brother Ingmar Bergman's semi-autobiographical film Fanny och Alexander.

== Life and career ==
Margareta Bergman, the only sister of film director Ingmar Bergman (1918–2007), is the author of the novels Karin and Mirror Mirror.

As a child of 8, she helped to inspire her brother Ingmar Bergman to create his first plays at home in 1930. Her older brother Dag Bergman (1914–1984) was an ambassador.

Her father Erik Bergman, a Lutheran priest, was extremely strict, and forced Margareta and her brothers to attend all of his Sunday church services.

Ingmar Bergman's most personal feature film, that he had intended to be his last, was the loosely autobiographical Fanny and Alexander, based on his and Margareta's unhappy childhood.

Margareta Bergman was married to the English author and broadcaster Paul Britten Austin from 1951 until his death in 2005. She had four children, Veronica Ralston (born 1951, who translated some of her books), Thomas Britten Austin, the sculptor Rose Britten Austin who is married to the artist Peter Ekberg Pelz, and Cecelia Britten Austin.

== Reception ==
Publishers Weekly wrote that in Mirror, Mirror, Bergman draws on a similar set of images as her brother Ingmar Bergman— wild strawberries, an "actress struck mute by aphasia" but with a "more delicate and muted result." The review concludes "Bergman's prose carefully circles, rather than describes, the unspeakable, resulting in an austere work of art softened by a uniquely modern wisdom."

== Bibliography ==
=== Novels available in English translation ===
- Margareta Bergman. Mirror Mirror, 1986. Translated by Veronica Ralston. (Original title: Spegel, Spegel) Reprinted Peter Owen, 1998.
- ————— Karin, Duckworth, 1985. Translated by Paul Britten Austin. (Original title: Karin vid havet) Reprinted St Martin's Press, 1989.

=== Novels only available in Swedish ===
- Margareta Bergman. Puckelryggen: en romantisk berättelse, Proprius, 1971.
- ————— Flickan i Obaldine: legendroman, Rabén & Sjögren, 1975.
- ————— Den sommaren och andra noveller, Rabén & Sjögren, 1976.
- ————— Ångestens barn, Carlsson, 1992.
