= Ohman =

Ohman or Öhman is a surname. Notable people with the surname include:

- Conny Öhman (1950–2010), Swedish politician
- Ivar Öhman (1914–1989), Swedish journalist and diplomat
- Jack Ohman (born 1960), American editorial cartoonist
- Jarl Öhman (1891–1936), Finnish footballer
- Ole Öhman (born 1973), Swedish drummer
- Mark Ohman, American oceanographer
- Phil Ohman (1896–1954), American film composer
- Will Ohman (born 1977), baseball player
