= Hans Colliander =

Swedish diplomat (1924–2013)

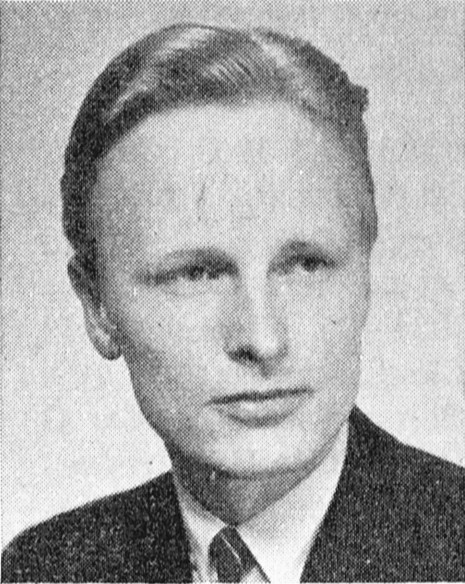
- Born: Hans Erland Oskar Colliander; 18 April 1924; Uppsala, Sweden
- Died: 18 October 2013 (aged 89); Stockholm, Sweden
- Education: Uppsala University; Stockholm School of Economics
- Occupation: Diplomat
- Years active: 1949–1994
- Spouse(s): Kerstin Fredriksson (m. 1950–1974) Hilda Spruyt Marti
- Children: 3

Hans Erland Oskar Colliander (18 April 1924 – 18 October 2013) was a Swedish diplomat. After completing degrees in law and economics, he entered the Ministry for Foreign Affairs in 1950. Over the following years he served in key postings abroad, including Washington, D.C., Paris, Stockholm, and Moscow. In 1969 Colliander was appointed counsellor at Sweden’s delegation in Geneva, where he remained until 1976. He then represented Sweden as Permanent Representative of Sweden to the OECD in Paris for nearly a decade, before serving as ambassador to Greece from 1985 to 1989. Alongside these senior appointments, he chaired trade and aviation negotiations with several countries, advised the Federation of Swedish Industries in the early 1990s, and twice chaired the OECD Steel Committee, first from 1980 to 1985 and again from 1989 onwards. He was also active in cultural diplomacy, serving on the board of the Association for Friends of the Swedish Athens Institute.

== Early life ==
Colliander was born on 18 April 1924 in Uppsala, Sweden, the son of Elof Colliander, a senior librarian, and his wife Harriet (née Lejdström). He received a Candidate of Law degree from Uppsala University in 1946 and a diploma from the Stockholm School of Economics in 1949 before he took up employment at Skandinaviska Banken in 1949.

== Career ==
Colliander joined the Ministry for Foreign Affairs as an attaché in 1950. He served as second secretary in 1954 and first secretary in 1959. His postings included Washington, D.C. (1952–1955), Paris (1955–1957), Stockholm (1957–1961), and Moscow (1961–1965). He later returned to the Ministry from 1965 to 1969.

Colliander was counsellor at the Swedish delegation in Geneva from 1969 to 1976, and Permanent Representative of Sweden to the OECD in Paris from 1976 to 1985. He then served as ambassador to Athens from 1985 to 1989. He acted as delegate and chairman in trade and aviation negotiations with various countries, was a consultant for the Federation of Swedish Industries (Sveriges Industriförbund) from 1990 to 1994, and served as chairman of the OECD Steel Committee from 1980 to 1985 and from 1989 onwards. He was also a board member of the Association for Friends of the Swedish Athens Institute.

== Personal life ==
Colliander was married from 1950 to 1974 to Kerstin Fredriksson (born 1923), the daughter of lumberman Vilhelm Fredriksson and Gertrud Korp. They had three children: Fredrik (1953–2004), Martine (born 1954), and Katarina Colliander Keane.

He was later married to Hilda Spruyt Marti.

After his retirement he settled in Athens, Greece. After an accident he spent the last two years of his life in Stockholm.

== Death ==
Colliander died on 18 October 2013 in Stockholm. A memorial service was held on 25 November 2013 in Skeppsholmen Church on Skeppsholmen in Stockholm. He was interred on 26 November 2013 at Norra begravningsplatsen in Solna.

== Awards and decorations ==
- (France) Order of the Black Star
- (Thailand) Order of the White Elephant

Diplomatic posts
Preceded by Leif Belfrage	Permanent Representative of Sweden to the OECD; 1976–1985	Succeeded by Bo Kjellén
Preceded by Iwo Dölling	Ambassador of Sweden to Greece; 1985–1989	Succeeded by Karl-Anders Wollter
