= Tällberg Forum =

The Tällberg Forum was a yearly meeting held by the Tällberg Foundation, in Tällberg, Sweden.

The Tällberg Foundation began its activities in 1981 by organizing yearly Tällberg workshops on topics related to globalization and interdependence. Since then Tällberg has connected and helped leaders better understand the challenges of the globalized world. Through studies and dialogue participants translate the analysis of emerging global patterns into inspiration for change. The Foundation's work is increasingly focused on the systems problems emerging from the growing imbalance between nature and human activity.

In 2005, the Foundation expanded by scaling up the yearly meetings by creating the Tällberg Forum. Running until 2013, the Tällberg Forums were award-winning events, greatly successful and inspiring to the participants. Exploring the question ‘How on Earth can we live together’, these Tällberg Experiences have touched thousands of leaders from all over the world.

The Tällberg model of intellectual conversations tightly integrated with arts and nature have become recognized as a unique experience, providing leaders from many sectors, disciplines and parts of the world with a venue where they meet for open and honest exchanges.

The Tällberg Foundation is an independent non-profit organization. Based on humanism the Foundation works in a learning environment with a systems perspective, specializing in learning processes and delivering policy and strategy recommendations for organisations. In addition to the yearly Forum, the Foundation organizes conferences, conversations, learning journeys, special studies and leadership development programs. The Foundation is based in Stockholm and Tällberg, Sweden, but interacts with numerous partners around the world. The Tällberg Foundation has, since 2013, shifted focus and leadership.

Tällberg pioneered communication of the reduction of carbon dioxide in the atmosphere to combat global warming, having supported the target of 350 ppm championed by 350.org.
