= Greece–Sweden relations =

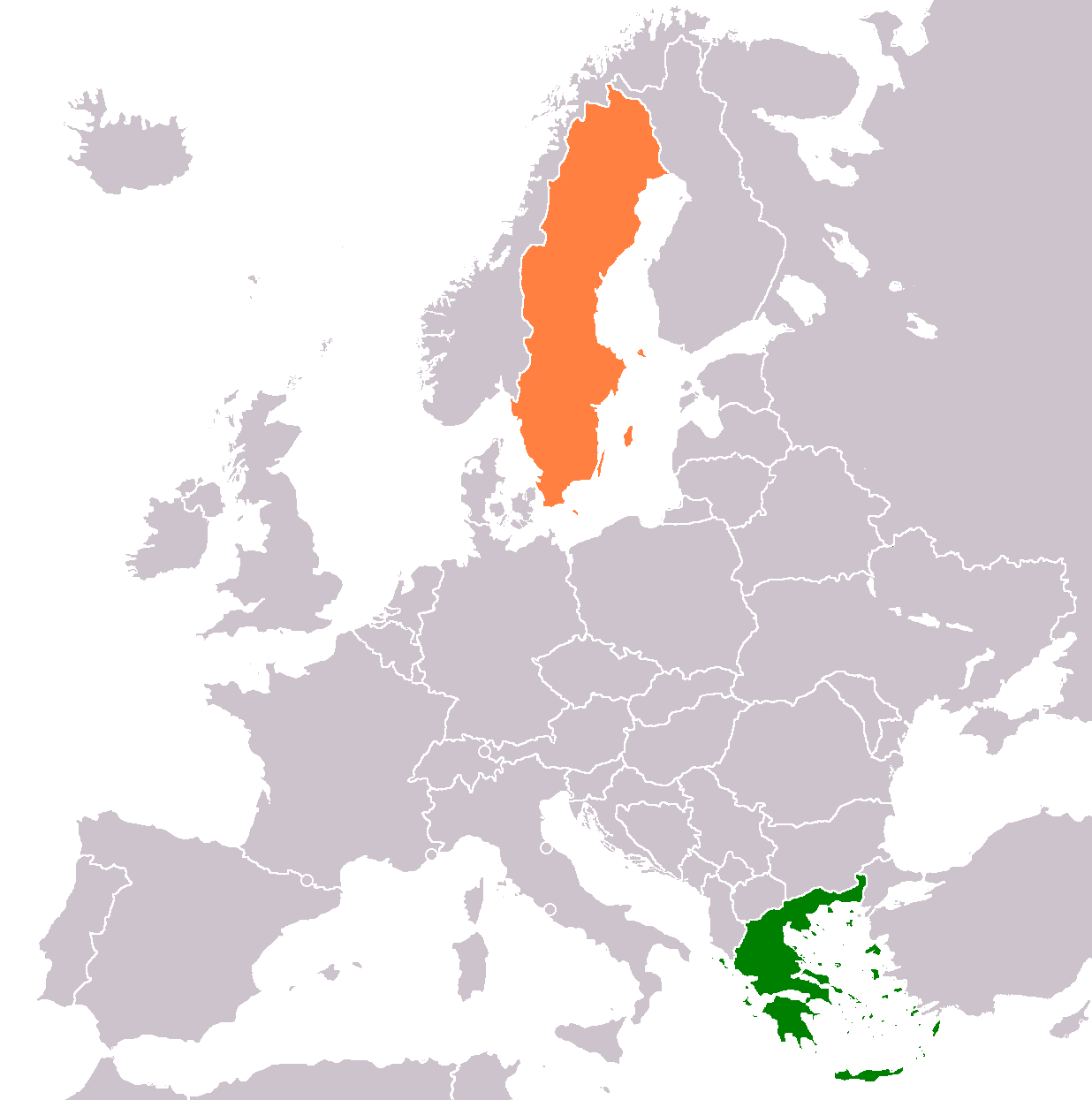
- Greece: Sweden

Diplomatic mission
- Embassy of Greece, Stockholm: Embassy of Sweden, Athens

The first contact between Greece and Sweden can be traced back to the 11th century. Both countries established diplomatic relations in 1852. Both countries are members of the Council of Europe, of the Organisation for Economic Co-operation and Development, of the Organization for Security and Co-operation in Europe, of the European Union, and of NATO. Greece supported Sweden's NATO membership during Sweden's accession into NATO, which was finalized on 7 March 2024.

== History ==
Diplomatic relations between Sweden and Greece were established in 1833, a few years after the Greek War of Independence. The first trade agreement between Sweden and Greece was signed in 1852.

In September 1934, Crown Prince Gustaf Adolf, Crown Princess Louise and Princess Ingrid visited Greece with the Svenska Orient Linien's motor ship Vasaland. They stopped at Patras, visited the paper mill in Aegion. On 20 September, they arrived in Piraeus, where they traveled by train to Athens, where they were received by president Alexandros Zaimis and representatives of government agencies. They also visited Delphi, Nafplio and Delos with the cruiser Hellas. On 28 September, Vasaland departed for Thessaloniki and then on to Istanbul on 2 October.

The Swedish Institute at Athens (SIA) was founded in 1946 with archeology as its main purpose. A double taxation agreement was signed in 1963.

In 1967, Sweden and three other countries brought the Greek Case against the Greek junta regime for human rights violations. Stockholm was since 1968 the base of the Panhellenic Liberation Movement resistance organization.

Since 1991, there has been a Swedish-Greek Chamber of Commerce in Athens. Business Sweden monitors Greece from Milan. There are about 40 Swedish-affiliated companies operating in Greece - most in the Athens area. In September 2022, Greece fully approved Sweden's application for NATO membership.

== List of bilateral treaties and agreements ==
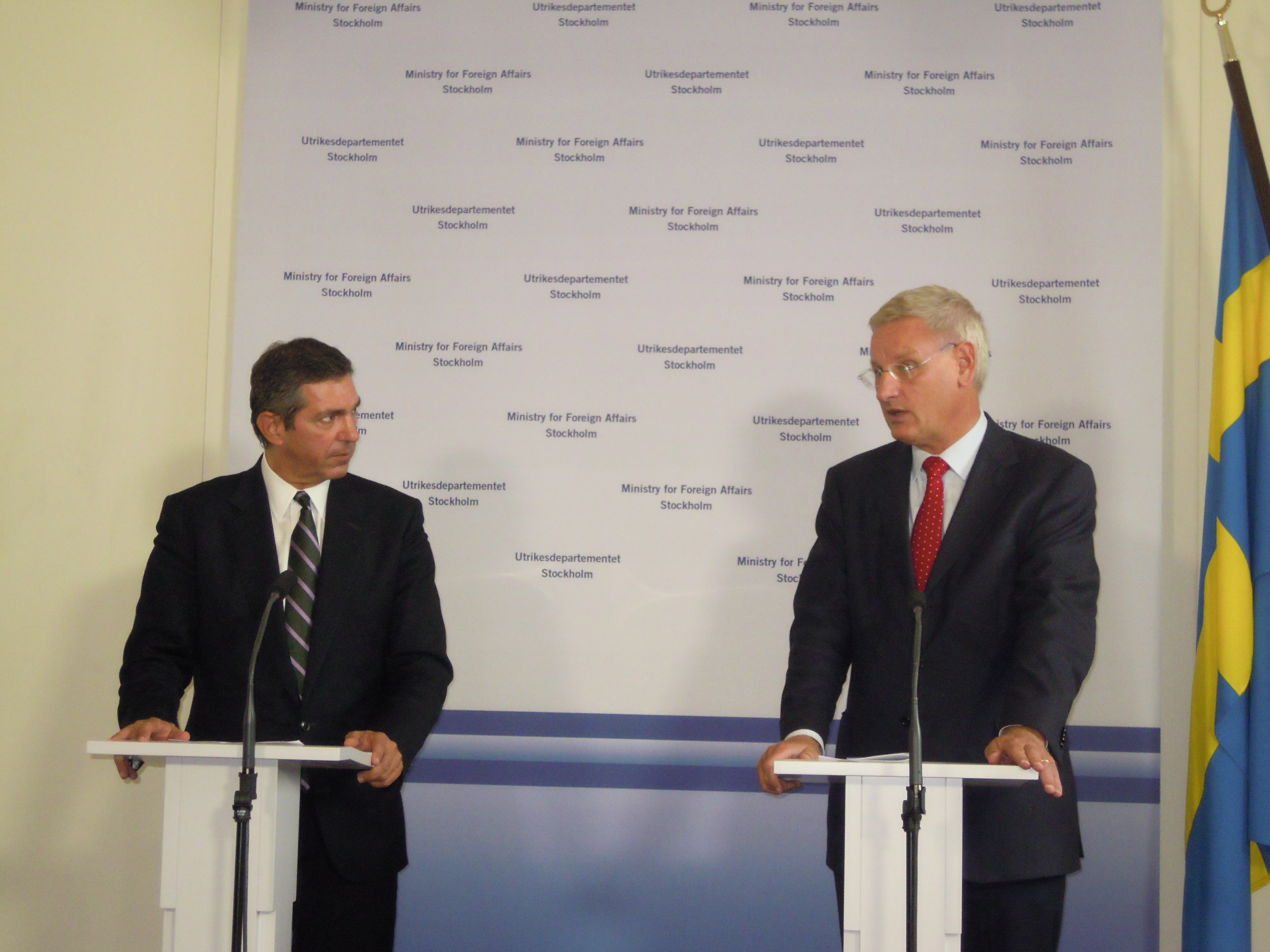
Greek Foreign Minister Stavros Lambrinidis and Swedish Foreign Minister Carl Bildt

- Treaty on Trade and Shipping (1852)
- Agreements or Memoranda have been signed since 1929
- Avoidance of Double Taxation of Income or capital (1961)
- Social Security (1984)
- Defense Cooperation (1999)

== List of recent bilateral visits ==
=== To Sweden ===
- 27 June 2006: Prime Minister of Greece Kostas Karamanlis visited Stockholm
- 20–22 May 2008: state visit of President of Greece Karolos Papoulias
- 2009: Prime Minister of Greece Kostas Karamanlis and Minister for Foreign Affairs Dora Bakoyannis on an official visit to Sweden
- August 2011: Minister for Foreign Affairs Stavros Lambrinidis visited Stockholm
- April 2012: Minister of Health and Social Solidarity Andreas Loverdos visited Stockholm
- April 2013: Minister of Tourism Olga Kefalogianni visited Stockholm
- February 2016: Minister for European Affairs Nikos Xydakis visited Stockholm
- October 2016: Minister of International Economic Relations Dimitris Mardas visited Stockholm
- March 2017: Minister for European Affairs Georgios Katrougalos visited Stockholm
- October 2019: Minister for European Affairs Miltiadis Varvitsiotis visited Stockholm

=== To Greece ===
- 24 October 2007: visit of Minister for Foreign Affairs Carl Bildt to Athens
- September 2009: Victoria, Crown Princess of Sweden visited Greece
- 2010: Minister for Gender Equality Nyamko Sabuni visited Athens
- 2010: Försvarsutskottet visited Athens
- 2010: Swedish Migration Agency visited Athens
- 2011: Speaker of the Riksdag with a delegation as well as the Committee on Social Insurance
- 26-27 March 2013: Minister for Foreign Affairs Carl Bildt visited Athens
- 16 September 2013: Minister for Foreign Affairs Carl Bildt visited Athens
- 11 October 2013: Minister for EU Affairs Birgitta Ohlsson visited Athens
- 2014: During the first half of 2014, a number of cabinet ministers and State Secretaries visited Athens to attend various informal ministerial meetings organized by the Greek Presidency of the Council of the European Union.
- 16 September 2014: Minister for Foreign Affairs Carl Bildt visited Athens
- 11 May 2015: State Secretary Hans Dahlgren visited Athens
- August 2016: Committee on Justice visited Greece
- 10-12 November 2016: State Secretary Pernilla Baralt visited Athens
- March 2017: Minister for Children, the Elderly and Gender Equality Åsa Regnér visited Athens
- September 2017: Committee on the Labour Market visited Athens
- 17 September 2017: Minister for Foreign Affairs Margot Wallström visited Athens to speak at the Athens Democracy Forum
- October 2017: Minister for Higher Education and Research Helene Hellmark Knutsson visited Athens
- March 2019: Landsbygdsminister Jennie Nilsson visited Athens
- May 2019: Victoria, Crown Princess of Sweden visited Athens
- October 2019: Former Minister for Foreign Affairs Margot Wallström visited Athens
- December 2019: Minister for EU Affairs Hans Dahlgren visited Athens
- January 2020: Committee on Social Insurance visited Athens and Malakasa
- May 2024: Minister for EU Affairs Jessika Roswall visited Athens for 2 days (Hellenic Parliament, Ministry of National Defence)

== Resident diplomatic missions ==
- Greece has an embassy in Stockholm.
- Sweden has an embassy in Athens.
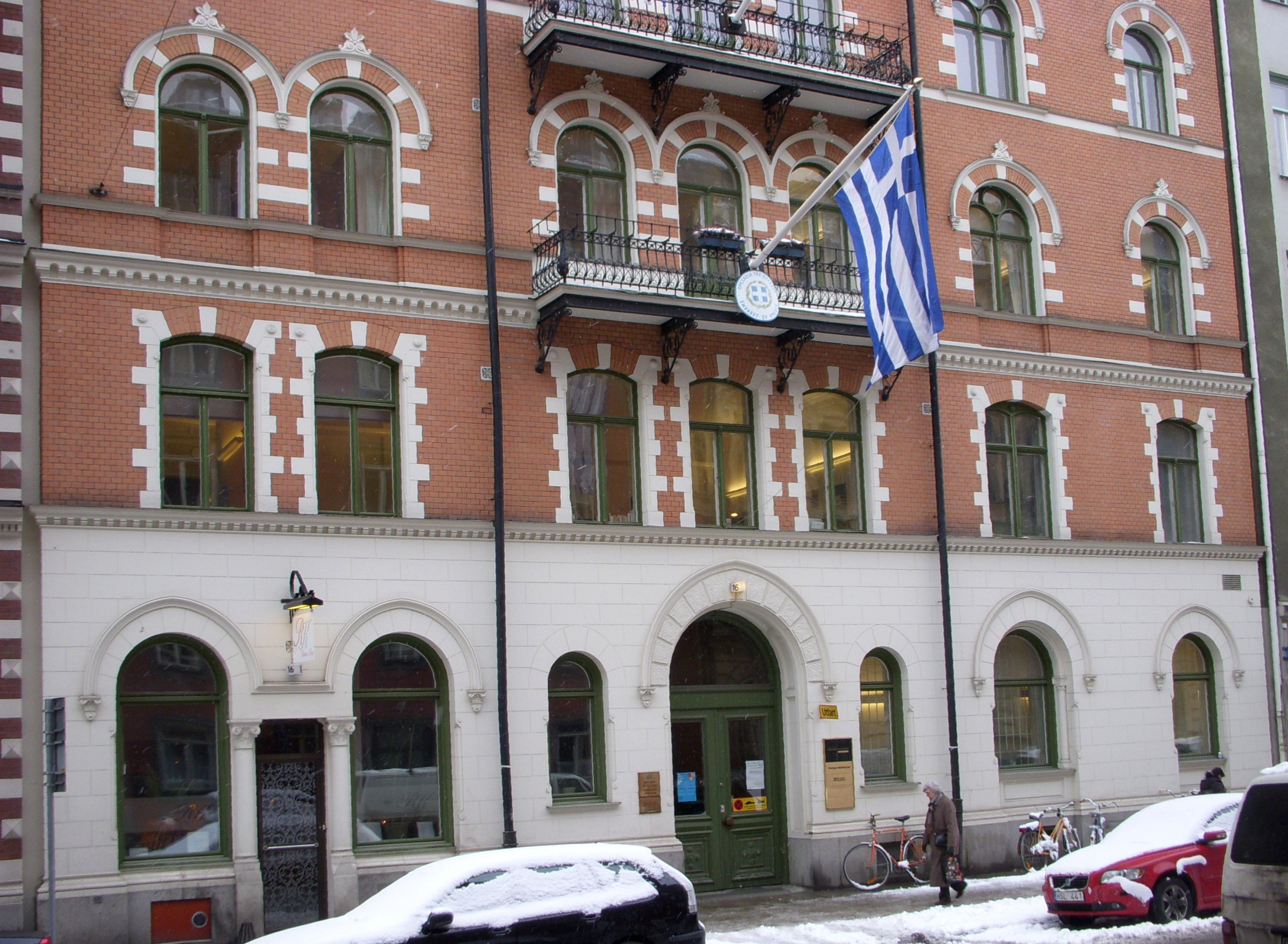
Embassy of Greece in Stockholm

Embassy of Sweden in Athens

== See also ==
- Foreign relations of Greece
- Foreign relations of Sweden
- NATO-EU relations
- Swedish Greeks
