= Embassy of Sweden, Athens =

- Location: Athens
- Address: Embassy of Sweden; Vassileos Konstantinou 7; 106 74 Athens; Greece
- Coordinates: 37°58′14.8″N 23°44′26.8″E
- Opening: 1945
- Ambassador: Håkan Emsgård
- Jurisdiction: Greece
- Website: Official website

The Embassy of Sweden in Athens, is Sweden's diplomatic mission in Greece. The mission opened in 1945 and was elevated to an embassy in 1956. Sweden also has five honorary consulates in Chania, Heraklion, Corfu, Rhodes, and in Thessaloniki

== History ==
Sweden has had diplomatic relations with Greece since 1833. The current embassy has its origin in the Swedish consulate in Athens, which was opened in 1833 after being moved there from Nafplio, where it was established on 1 July 1830. After the consulate in Corfu (established on 1 October 1823) was closed, the Athens consulate was the only one in Greece and was expressly recognized as having the entire country as its district through letters patent on 25 May 1850, which also declared it a consulate general. The consul general also held a diplomatic mission. After the passing of the first holder (Carl Peter von Heidenstam) on 5 June 1878, the consulate general was closed through letters patent on 7 November 1879, and was replaced by a consulate in Piraeus from the same date. The consulate in Piraeus had all of Greece as its district. According to a decision on 28 January 1898, the holder was thereafter to be called the consul general.

The first resident Swedish minister in Greece was appointed in 1944 after the Swedish envoy had previously been accredited from the Swedish legations in Bucharest and in Ankara. Knut Richard Thyberg arrived in Greece in August 1944. As the Germans did not permit any foreign diplomatic representatives, Minister Thyberg initially held the title of Swedish Consul General and only gained full diplomatic status after Greece's liberation and the Germans' withdrawal in October 1944. At that time, apart from Minister Thyberg, the only remaining diplomatic and consular foreign personnel in Athens were the Swedish Consul Gösta Risberg, a former Spanish minister, and a Swiss former chargé d'affaires. Minister Thyberg conducted his official duties at the Dutch legation, whose interests Sweden represented. Furthermore, Sweden also looked after the interests of the Soviet Union and Argentina. During the activities associated with these protective missions, Minister Thyberg, thanks to a considerable level of understanding from SS General Walter Schimana, who was then the highest-ranking German military officer in Athens, managed to liberate around 50 Jews from captivity and return them to their homes.

The Swedish legation was elevated to an embassy in 1956 after an agreement was reached between the Swedish and Greek governments to elevate each other's legations to embassies. Sweden's newly appointed envoy in Athens, Count Fritz Stackelberg, was thus given the position of ambassador.

On 15 December 1967, the Swedish government decided to recall Ambassador Gösta Brunnström for consultations as a demonstration against the Greek military junta. The embassy was then without an ambassador for five years until embassy counselor Dag Bergman was appointed as ambassador to Athens in 1972.

In March 1976, the Tokyo Police announced that the Swedish embassy in Athens was close to being occupied by the Japanese Red Army, as it was part of the terrorists' contingency plan in case the operation against the French embassy in The Hague in 1974 had failed. The Japanese Red Army had occupied the Swedish embassy in Kuala Lumpur the previous year, holding 15 people hostage.

== Staff and Tasks ==
=== Staff ===
The embassy staff is organized into several key roles and departments:

- Ambassador's Office: Manages the ambassador's activities, with support from an assistant to the ambassador.
- Political and Promotion Unit: Focuses on political affairs and promotion, led by a First Secretary who is also the Deputy Head of Mission.
- Administration and Consular Affairs Unit: Handles administrative tasks and consular services, led by a First Secretary who manages these functions.
- Migration and Consular Affairs Unit: Deals with migration issues and additional consular matters.
- Communication and Culture Unit: Responsible for communication and cultural activities.
- Financial and Support Services: Includes a Treasurer who manages financial matters.
- Support Staff: Includes a driver and an intern who assist with various duties.

=== Tasks ===
The embassy's task is to represent Sweden in Greece and promote relations between Sweden and Greece. The embassy monitors and reports on political and economic developments in Greece. The embassy promotes trade between Sweden and Greece in collaboration with Business Sweden and also promotes tourism and cultural exchange between the countries and contributes to strengthening the image of, and increasing knowledge of, Sweden in Greece. The embassy carries out consular work regarding the approximately 850,000 Swedish citizens who visit Greece annually, as well as the Swedish citizens who are permanently resident in Greece. The embassy collaborates with Business Sweden, the Swedish Institute at Athens, the Hellenic-Swedish Chamber of Commerce and the Church of Sweden in Greece.

== Buildings ==
=== Chancery ===
The chancery was 1945–1955 located at rue Patriarchou loachim 20, Athens, 1956–1963 at rue Stissichorou 15, Athens, in 1964 at rue Méléagrou, Athens 138, and from 1965 at 4 rue Méléagrou & Boulevard Vassileos Konstantinou, Athens 138,

As of 2026, the chancery are located at Vassileos Konstantinou 7, at the top of the fifth floor of a building built in 1977. The building also houses the embassies of the Netherlands and Ireland. Across the street is the Panathenaic Stadium from 1896, the year the first modern Olympic Games took place. The Swedish Embassy moved in during 1979 and in connection with that the chancery was rebuilt. Ten years later, in 1989, a thorough renovation and installation of a new reception, security lock and interview room was carried out. In 2003, the embassy's premises were renovated and a new heating and cooling system was installed. In 2012, a new elevator was installed.

Vassileos Konstantinou 7 (1979–present)

=== Residence ===
The ambassador's residence was 1955–1956 located at Rue Méléagrou 5, 1957–1964 at Rue Roi Georges II, n:o 1, 1965–1966 at 1 rue Vassileos Georgiou B, and from 1967 at 17 rue Hirodou Attikou.

The landlord of the previously rented Swedish ambassadorial residence sold the house and the new owner did not want to rent it out. A suitable replacement property was found in the Filothei district, located on the slope northeast of the city center overlooking Athens and Mount Pentelicus. The district is a quiet residential area and several countries have relocated their ambassadorial residences here. The ambassador's residence was built and purchased in 1989. The architect's name is Stelios Agiostatitis. Its located at Ioannou Metaxa 56 in Filothei.

The ambassador's residence is a detached earth shelter villa in two floors and a basement. Both exterior and interior are white, the latter with white marble floors and white painted walls. There are glass walls facing the valley. The entrance is on the street level, as is the representation floor with study, lounge, dining room and kitchen. Outside the dining room and lounge is a large terrace of about 120 square metre. On the ambassador's private floor, there are five bedrooms, a living room, four bathrooms and two smaller terraces. Recreation room, storage rooms and rooms for service staff are located in the basement. There is also a garage. The property has a walled raised plot of 1,200 square metre. In the garden there is a solar heated pool.

== See also ==
- Greece–Sweden relations
