= Dag Bergman =

Swedish diplomat (1914–1984)

- Born: Dag Erik Bergman; 23 October 1914
- Died: 10 December 1984 (aged 70); Athens, Greece
- Education: Uppsala University
- Occupation: Diplomat
- Years active: 1945–1980
- Spouse(s): Anna Lönnqvist (m. 1947) Elisabeth Adossidou
- Children: 2
- Family: Erik Bergman (father); Ingmar Bergman (brother); Margareta Bergman (sister)

Dag Erik Bergman (23 October 1914 – 10 December 1984) was a Swedish diplomat.

== Early life ==
Bergman was the son of Erik Bergman, a parish minister, and his wife Karin Bergman, née Åkerblom, and the older brother of film director Ingmar Bergman and novelist Margareta Bergman. According to Karin Lannby, Bergman was employed by the intelligence organization C-byrån and was part of the Swedish Volunteer Corps during the Winter War in Finland and active in the National League of Sweden. Bergman received a Bachelor of Arts degree from Uppsala University in 1938 and a Candidate of Law degree from Stockholm University in 1944.

== Career ==
Bergman became an attaché at the Ministry for Foreign Affairs in 1945. He served as first secretary in Athens in 1963, as embassy counsellor in 1970 (acting in 1965). When Ambassador Gösta Brunnström was called back to Stockholm in 1967 as a protest of the Greek military junta, Bergman took over as head of the Swedish embassy as embassy counsellor and chargé d'affaires for five years until he was appointed ambassador in 1972. He served until 1973 when he was appointed consul general in Hong Kong. Bergman served in this position until 1980 when he retired.

== Personal life ==
On 7 September 1947, at Holy Trinity Church in Uppsala, Bergman married Miss Anna Lönnqvist, daughter of Mrs. Anna Lönnqvist (née Nilsson) from Stockholm. The officiant was the groom's father, court chaplain Erik Bergman. They had two children: Carl-Henrik and Jan-Erik. He later married Elisabeth Adossidou.

Bergman was from the 1960s seriously ill, paralyzed by polio and using a wheelchair.

== Death ==
Bergman died in Athens on 10 December 1984. He was buried in the same city.

Diplomatic posts
Preceded by Gösta Brunnström	Ambassador of Sweden to Greece; 1972–1973	Succeeded by Agda Rössel
Preceded by Carl Kjellberg	Consul general of Sweden in Hong Kong; 1973–1980	Succeeded by Åke Berg
