= Ivar Öhman =

Swedish journalist and diplomat

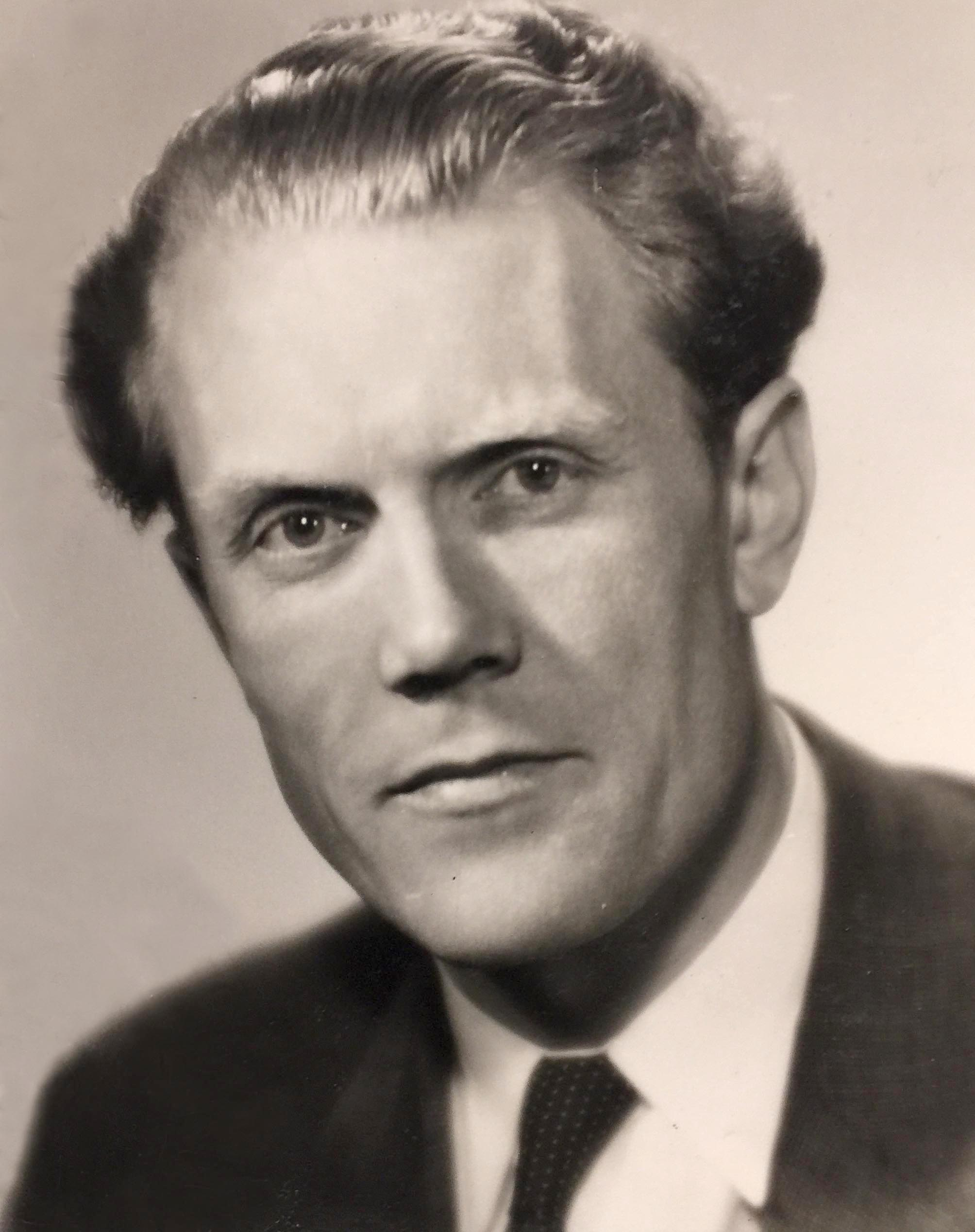
- Öhman in the 1950s
- Born: Oscar Ivar Öhman; 19 January 1914; Timrå, Sweden
- Died: 25 August 1989 (aged 75); Stockholm, Sweden
- Occupations: Journalist, diplomat
- Years active: 1931–1980
- Spouse(s): Ingrid Rollvén (m. 1940) Birgit Koch (m. 1952–1989)
- Children: 5

Oscar Ivar Öhman (19 January 1914 – 25 August 1989) was a Swedish journalist and diplomat. He served as Ambassador of Sweden to Greece from 1976 to 1980.

== Early life ==
Öhman was born on 19 January 1914 in Timrå, Sweden, the son of Oscar Öhman, an editor, and his wife Elvira (née Näslund).

== Career ==
Öhman was a contributor to Norrlands-Kuriren from 1931 to 1934 and published Unga Röster between 1932 and 1934. He was editorial secretary at Folket i Bild in 1934 and editor-in-chief there from 1946 to 1962, and for Utflykt in 1962. Öhman served as a press attaché at the Swedish embassy in Oslo with position as counsellor in 1963 and as press counsellor in 1970. He served as ambassador in Athens from 1976 to 1980.

== Personal life and death ==
In 1940, Öhman married Ingrid Rollvén (born 1915), the daughter of Hjalmar Rollvén and Ester (née Trolin). In 1952, he married Birgit Koch (born 1924), the daughter of Rolf Koch and Sally (née Trolin). Children in his first marriage: Hans (born 1942), Lars (born 1944), and Per (born 1948). Children in his second marriage: Kristina (born 1953) and Rolf (born 1956).

== Death ==
Öhman died on 25 August 1989 in Gustav Vasa Parish, Stockholm. He was interred at Norra begravningsplatsen in Solna Municipality on 3 October 1989.

== Awards ==
- Illis quorum, 12th size (1984)

== Selected bibliography ==
- Öhman, Ivar (1943). Skämt på allvar (in Swedish). Stockholm: Rabén & Sjögren. SELIBR 379363.
- Öhman, Ivar; Sallberg, Harald (1952). De bästa dikterna av tolv moderna svenska författare: Nils Ferlin, Harry Martinson ... Werner Aspenström (in Swedish). Stockholm. SELIBR 3204873.
- Öhman, Ivar, ed. (1953). De bästa dikterna: av tolv moderna svenska författare : Nils Ferlin, Harry Martinson, Johannes Edfelt, Artur Lundkvist, Gunnar Ekelöf, Erik Lindegren, Karl Vennberg, Harald Forss, Maria Wine, Stig Sjödin, Sven Alfons, Werner Aspenström (in Swedish). Stockholm: Folket i Bilds förlag. SELIBR 821009.
- Öhman, Ivar, ed. (1953). Tolv moderna poeter: Bertil Malmberg, Pär Lagerkvist, Erik Blomberg, Hjalmar Gullberg, Arnold Ljungdal, Carl-Emil Englund, Emil Hagström, Ebba Lindqvist, Ann Margaret Dahlquist-Ljungberg, Lars Englund, Arne Nyman, Stig Carlson (in Swedish). Stockholm: Folket i bild. SELIBR 1469009.
- Öhman, Ivar, ed. (1944). Trettio stora namn ur Folket i bilds årgångar : b noveller, dikter, artiklar och bilder (in Swedish). Stockholm: Folket i bild. SELIBR 1420685.
- Öhman, Ivar, ed. (1986). Tage Erlander i närbilder (in Swedish) (1st ed.). Malmö: LiberFörlag. ISBN 9138617617. SELIBR 7268279.
- Öhman, Ivar, ed. (1952). Ny samling klassiska och moderna noveller. Berömda berättare, 99-1449900-7; 3 (in Swedish). Stockholm: Folket i Bild. SELIBR 1569887.

Diplomatic posts
Preceded by Agda Rössel	Ambassador of Sweden to Greece; 1976–1980	Succeeded by Iwo Dölling
