= Göran Ryding =

Swedish diplomat (1916–2007)

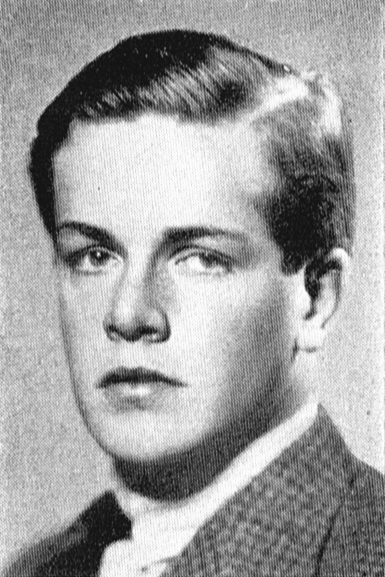
- Ryding in his youth

Ambassador of Sweden to the Soviet Union
- In office 1975–1979
- Preceded by: Brynolf Eng
- Succeeded by: Carl De Geer

Ambassador of Sweden to Mongolia
- In office 1975–1979
- Preceded by: Brynolf Eng
- Succeeded by: Carl De Geer

Ambassador of Sweden to Finland
- In office 1971–1975
- Preceded by: Ingemar Hägglöf
- Succeeded by: Sten Sundfeldt

Deputy State Secretary for Foreign Affairs
- In office 1968–1971
- Preceded by: Nils Montan
- Succeeded by: Sverker Åström

Personal details
- Born: Per Göran Gustaf Ryding; 17 September 1916 Vallvik, Sweden
- Died: 12 February 2007 (aged 90) Stockholm, Sweden
- Spouse: Cecilia Wersäll (m. 1940)
- Children: 3
- Relatives: Axel Ryding (great-uncle); Edvin Ryding (great-grandchild); Gustaf Wersäll (father-in-law); Gunnar Hägglöf (cousin); Ingemar Hägglöf (cousin)
- Education: Lundsbergs boarding school Uppsala University
- Occupation: Diplomat

Per Göran Gustaf Ryding (17 September 1916 – 12 February 2007) was a Swedish diplomat who joined the Ministry of Foreign Affairs in 1939. During his early career, he served in Rome, Bern, London, and Paris, increasingly specializing in international trade and economic diplomacy. From 1961 to 1971, Ryding held several senior positions within the Foreign Ministry, including director general for foreign affairs and head of the Trade Department. He played an important role in shaping Sweden's trade policy and helped lay the groundwork for the country's free trade agreement with the EEC in 1972.

Ryding later served as ambassador to Helsinki (1971–1975), where he played an active role in the CSCE negotiations and worked to strengthen Sweden's position as a neutral bridge between East and West. From 1975 to 1979, he was ambassador to Moscow, also accredited to Mongolia. After retiring from the diplomatic service, he worked as an adviser to Beijer Group, supporting its international expansion, particularly in Eastern Europe.

== Early life ==
Ryding was born on 17 September 1916 in Vallvik, Gävleborg County, Sweden, the son of industrialist Gösta Ryding (1881–1969) and his wife Annie (née Rudberg). His paternal grandfather was County Governor Gustaf Ryding (1833–1901), and his paternal great-uncle was Lieutenant General Axel Ryding (1831–1897). His maternal grandfather was physician Fritz Rudberg (1841–1904), and his maternal uncle was journalist Erik Rudberg (1891–1959). He was a cousin of ambassadors Gunnar Hägglöf (1904–1994) and Ingemar Hägglöf (1912–1995), as well as Colonel Lars Gösta Hägglöf (1897–1954).

He grew up in the industrial community of Göta, where his father, Gösta, was the managing director. He graduated from Lundsbergs boarding school in 1935 and received a Candidate of Law degree from Uppsala University in 1939. In Uppsala, he actively participated in student life, including involvement in the Juvenalorden.

== Career ==
Ryding joined the Ministry of Foreign Affairs in 1939. He initially entered the ministry in an unpaid reserve position and was only narrowly accepted for a position as an attaché. He served in Rome in 1940 and Bern in 1942, and was appointed acting second secretary at the Ministry for Foreign Affairs in 1944. He then served in London in 1945, became acting first embassy secretary in 1948, and acting first secretary at the Ministry for Foreign Affairs in 1949. From 1949, he served as a representative in trade-policy negotiations, and in 1950 became first secretary. In 1954, he was appointed counsellor at the Swedish delegation to the OEEC in Paris, and from 1955 to 1958 he chaired Sweden's trade negotiations with France.

From 1955 to 1958, Ryding also served as counsellor at the Swedish embassy in Paris. In 1958, he became counsellor at the Swedish embassy in Moscow, Bucharest, Kabul, and Sofia. He was appointed minister in 1960 and director general for foreign affairs (utrikesråd) in 1961. From 1961 to 1963, he served as deputy head of the Ministry for Foreign Affairs' Trade Department, becoming head of the Trade Department in 1964 and serving in that position until 1967. From 1968 to 1971, he was deputy state secretary for foreign affairs. Between 1961 and 1971, with Gunnar Lange serving as minister of commerce and industry, Ryding played a central role in shaping Sweden's trade policy. It was during this period that the groundwork was laid for the negotiations that ultimately resulted in Sweden's free trade agreement with the EEC in 1972.

Ryding subsequently served as ambassador to Helsinki from 1971 to 1975, succeeding his cousin, Ingemar Hägglöf. In Helsinki, he played a central role in Sweden's efforts surrounding the Conference on Security and Co-operation in Europe (CSCE). As head of the Swedish embassy in Helsinki, he participated in the preparatory negotiations and came to play an important role in cooperation among the neutral and non-aligned states. Ryding worked pragmatically to bridge the differences between East and West and developed particularly close contacts with the Swiss ambassador, Samuel Campiche. Through his negotiating efforts, he helped strengthen Sweden's position as an independent and balancing actor in the CSCE process.

Ryding served as ambassador to Moscow from 1975 to 1979, with dual accreditation to Mongolia. After his retirement, Anders Wall brought him on as a consultant to Beijer Group from 1979 to 1990. As a senior adviser, Ryding contributed to the company's international expansion, particularly its efforts to develop business ties eastward.

== Personal life ==
In 1940, Ryding married Cecilia Wersäll (1919–2013), the daughter of Captain Gustaf Wersäll and Kerstin (née Sahlin). Cecilia's uncles included Claës-Axel Wersäll and Ture Wersäll. Her paternal grandfather was Finance Minister Claës Wersäll, and her paternal grandmother was the noblewoman Charlotta Wersäll.

For many years during her husband's service at the Ministry for Foreign Affairs, Cecilia worked to improve the conditions of spouses accompanying diplomats. In 1961, a group of diplomats' wives took the initiative to establish the Sophia Albertina Klubban (SAK), of which she became the first chairwoman and co-author of a handbook, AB-CD, containing practical advice for spouses accompanying Ministry for Foreign Affairs officials.

They had three children: Pia (born 1941), Johan (born 1943), and journalist Lars Ryding (1947–2025). His great-grandchild, through his son Lars, is actor Edvin Ryding (born 2003).

The Ryding family had a country house on Kymmendö, in the Stockholm Archipelago.

== Reputation ==
The journalist Gunnar Unger described Göran Ryding as a highly gifted, quick-minded, and organisationally capable person with extensive language skills and an agreeable manner. He particularly emphasises Ryding's ability to deal effectively with people, describing him as independent, trustworthy, and largely free from opportunism. Unger also highlights Ryding's ability to combine a friendly and pleasant manner with considerable firmness – he could be "very pleasant and at the same time very tough." According to Unger, Ryding had neither a "fear of Russia" nor a "fear of communism," while at the same time he was no uncritical supporter of communism. Unger regarded this combination of social skills, independence, and toughness as qualities that would make Ryding well suited to his assignment as ambassador in Moscow.

Diplomats Frank Belfrage and Ulf Dinkelspiel described Göran Ryding as a knowledgeable and highly skilled negotiator who used humour to untangle even the most difficult negotiating situations. They portray him as someone who combined a gentle and diplomatic manner with firmness and determination when it came to matters of substance. The Latin phrase fortiter in re, suaviter in modo – "resolute in execution, gentle in manner" – aptly captures the qualities they associated with him.

== Death ==
Ryding died on 12 February 2007 in Oscar Parish in Stockholm. The funeral service took place on 22 March 2007, at Gustaf Adolf Church.

== Awards and decorations ==
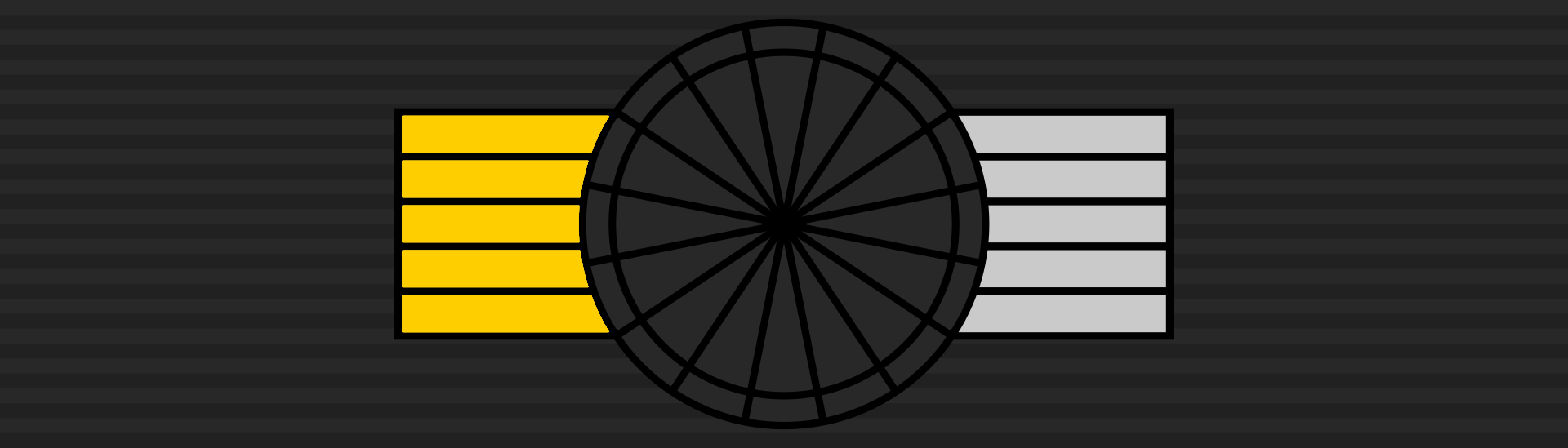
- (Sweden) Commander 1st Class of the Order of the Polar Star (6 June 1974)
- (Sweden) Commander of the Order of the Polar Star (22 November 1965)
- (Sweden) Knight of the Order of the Polar Star (1959)
- (France) Officer of the Legion of Honour
- (Netherlands) Officer of the Order of Orange-Nassau
- Knight of the Order of the Crown of Italy

Civic offices
Preceded by Nils Montan	Deputy State Secretary for Foreign Affairs; 1968–1971	Succeeded by Sverker Åström
Diplomatic posts
Preceded by Ingemar Hägglöf	Ambassador of Sweden to Finland; 1971–1975	Succeeded by Sten Sundfeldt
Preceded by Brynolf Eng	Ambassador of Sweden to the Soviet Union; 1975–1979	Succeeded by Carl de Geer
