= Wersäll =

Wersäll is a Swedish surname. Notable people with the surname include:

- Claës Wersäll (1848–1919), Swedish governor and artillery officer
- Charlotta Wersäll (1858–1924), Swedish noblewoman, wife of Claes
- Claës-Axel Wersäll (1888–1951), Swedish gymnast, son of Claes and Charlotta
- Fredrik Wersäll (born 1951), Swedish jurist, lawyer, and civil servant
- Gustaf Wersäll (1887–1973), Swedish modern pentathlete, son of Claes and Charlotta, brother of Claes-Axel
- Ture Wersäll (1883–1965), Swedish tug of war competitor, son of Claes and Charlotta, brother of Claes-Axel and Gustaf
