= Sohlman =

Sohlman is a surname. Notable people with the surname include:

- August Sohlman (1824–1874), Swedish journalist and politician
- Harald Sohlman (1868–1927), a Swedish publisher
- Ragnar Sohlman (1870–1948), a Swedish chemical engineer, manager, civil servant
- Rolf Sohlman (1900–1967), a Swedish diplomat
- Rolf Sohlman (born 1954), a Swedish actor
- 12199 Sohlman (1980 TK6), a main-belt asteroid discovered on 1980 by L. V. Zhuravleva
- Mikael Gabriel (born 1990), Finnish rapper (surname Sohlman)
