= Olof Bjurström =

Swedish diplomat (1917–1989)

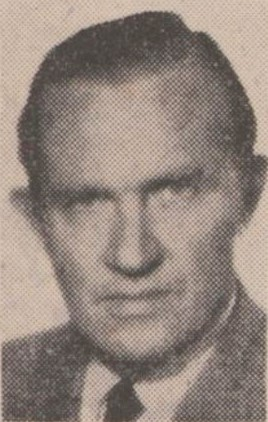
- Born: Olof Gustaf Bjurström; 20 July 1917; Rotterdam, Netherlands
- Died: 12 November 1989 (aged 72); Montreal, Canada
- Resting place: Lidingö Cemetery
- Education: Uppsala University
- Occupation: Diplomat
- Years active: 1942–1983
- Spouse(s): Margareta Romdahl (m. 1942–1949) Marianne von Heland (m. 1951)
- Children: 5
- Relatives: Tor Bjurström (uncle)

Olof Gustaf Bjurström (20 July 1917 – 12 November 1989) was a Swedish diplomat whose career in the Swedish Foreign Service spanned more than four decades. He joined the Ministry for Foreign Affairs in 1942 and held a succession of diplomatic and consular posts in Europe, Australia, New Zealand, and the United States, including assignments in Helsinki, Oslo, Canberra, Wellington, New York City, Chicago, and Paris.

He was appointed ambassador to Romania in 1964, serving in Bucharest until 1967, and subsequently served as ambassador to the Democratic Republic of the Congo, with concurrent accreditation to several countries in Central and West Africa. From 1971 to 1974, he was Sweden's ambassador to New Zealand, followed by appointments as consul general in Montreal (1975–1980) and Istanbul (1980–1983).

== Early life ==
Bjurström was born on 20 July 1917 in Rotterdam, Netherlands, the son of the parish priest and court chaplain Birger Bjurström and his wife, Thora (née Ström). At the time, his father was serving as a chaplain at the Swedish Seamen's Church in Rotterdam.

He was the brother of the translator and publishing correspondent C.G. Bjurström (1919–2001). His paternal uncles were the opera singer Harald Bjurström (1885–1938) and the painter Tor Bjurström (1888–1966). His cousin was the architect Frederik Bjurström (1920–1999).

He completed his upper-secondary school examination in Paris in 1935 and earned a Candidate of Law degree from Uppsala University on 19 June 1942.

== Career ==
Bjurström joined the Ministry for Foreign Affairs in Stockholm as an attaché in 1942. He subsequently served in Helsinki (1943), Oslo (1944), and at the Foreign Ministry (1946), before being posted as embassy secretary in Canberra (1948), acting consul in Wellington (1949), and vice consul in New York City (1950). He returned to the Foreign Ministry as first secretary in 1952 and was appointed first vice consul in New York City in 1954, consul in Chicago in 1956, and embassy counsellor in Paris in 1960.

Bjurström served as ambassador to Bucharest from 1964 to 1967 and to Kinshasa from 1967 to 1971, with concurrent accreditation to Cameroon, Equatorial Guinea (from 1969), Gabon, and the People's Republic of the Congo. He was ambassador to Wellington from 1971 to 1974, then consul general in Montreal from 1975 to 1980, a tenure that coincided with the 1976 Summer Olympics. He served as consul general in Istanbul from 1980 to 1983.

== Personal life ==
Bjurström was married to Margareta Romdahl (1917–2006) from 1942 to 1949, the daughter of Major G. Romdahl and Karin Bolin. They had two daughters, Görel (born 1945) and Blenda (born 1946).

In 1951, Bjurström married Marianne von Heland (1915–1995), the daughter of Colonel Frans von Heland and Ellen (née Rådberg). They had three sons, Carl (born 1952), Johan (born 1954), and Peter (born 1957).

== Death ==
Bjurström died on 12 November 1989 in Montreal, Canada. A memorial service was held on 30 November 1989 at the Norwegian Seamen's Church in Montreal. He was interred on 16 June 1990 in the Bjurström family grave at Lidingö Cemetery.

== Awards and decorations ==
- (Sweden) Commander of the Order of the Polar Star (17 November 1970)
- (Sweden) Knight of the Order of the Polar Star (1964)
- Knight of the Order of the White Rose of Finland
- (Netherlands) Knight of the Order of Orange-Nassau
- (Norway) Knight of the Order of St. Olav

Diplomatic posts
| Preceded by Rolf Sohlman | Ambassador of Sweden to Romania; 1964–1967 | Succeeded by Carl Johan Rappe |
| Preceded by Dag Malm | Ambassador of Sweden to the Democratic Republic of the Congo; 1967–1971 | Succeeded by Henrik Ramel |
| Preceded by Dag Malm | Ambassador of Sweden to Cameroon; 1967–1971 | Succeeded by Henrik Ramel |
| Preceded by Dag Malm | Ambassador of Sweden to Gabon; 1967–1971 | Succeeded by Henrik Ramel |
| Preceded by None | Ambassador of Sweden to the Equatorial Guinea; 1969–1971 | Succeeded by Henrik Ramel |
| Preceded by None | Ambassador of Sweden to the People's Republic of the Congo; 1967–1971 | Succeeded by Henrik Ramel |
| Preceded by Carl-Gustaf Béve | Ambassador of Sweden to New Zealand; 1971–1974 | Succeeded by Sten Aminoff |
| Preceded by Sten Aminoff | Consul General of Sweden in Montreal; 1975–1980 | Succeeded by Claës Erik Winberg |
| Preceded by Gösta Westin | Consul General of Sweden in Istanbul; 1980–1983 | Succeeded by Erik Esséen |
