= Gunnar Hägglöf =

Swedish diplomat (1904–1994)

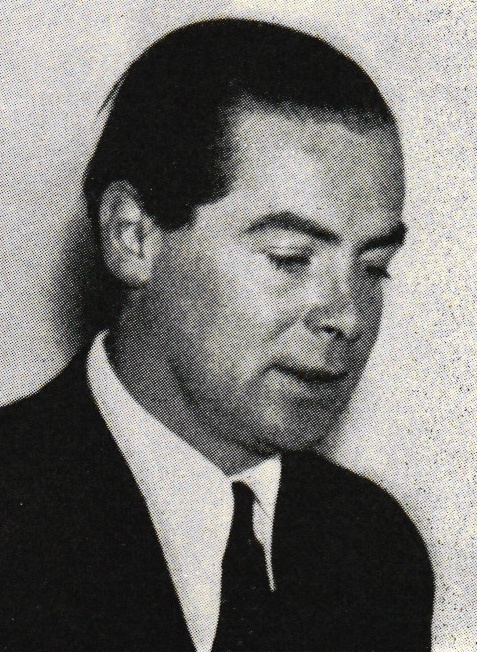

Ambassador of Sweden to France
- In office 1967 – 1 July 1971
- Preceded by: Rolf Sohlman
- Succeeded by: Ingemar Hägglöf

Ambassador of Sweden to the United Kingdom
- In office 1948–1967
- Preceded by: Erik Boheman
- Succeeded by: Leif Belfrage

Permanent Representative to the United Nations
- In office 1947–1948
- Preceded by: Herman Eriksson
- Succeeded by: Sven Grafström

Envoy of Sweden to Soviet Union
- In office 1946–1947
- Preceded by: Staffan Söderblom
- Succeeded by: Rolf Sohlman

Envoy of Sweden to Belgium
- In office 1944–1946
- Preceded by: Gustaf von Dardel
- Succeeded by: Einar Modig

Envoy of Sweden to the Netherlands
- In office 1944–1946
- Preceded by: Erik Sjöborg
- Succeeded by: Joen Lagerberg

Minister without portfolio
- In office 14 October 1939 – 13 December 1939
- Monarch: Gustaf V
- Prime Minister: Per Albin Hansson
- Preceded by: Herman Eriksson
- Succeeded by: Thorwald Bergquist

Personal details
- Born: Bo Gunnar Rickardsson Hägglöf; 12 December 1904 Helsingborg, Sweden
- Died: 12 January 1994 (aged 89) Stockholm, Sweden
- Spouse(s): Brita Sundström (m. 1936, divorced) Anna Folchi-Vici (m. 1946)
- Children: 2 (Note: A biological daughter and an adopted son.)
- Relatives: Ingemar Hägglöf (brother); Göran Ryding (cousin)
- Education: Nya elementarskolan
- Alma mater: Uppsala University
- Occupation: Diplomat

Bo Gunnar Rickardsson Hägglöf (12 December 1904 – 12 January 1994) was one Sweden's most influential diplomats of the twentieth century, whose career spanned over forty years and several of the century's most turbulent decades.

He joined the Swedish Ministry for Foreign Affairs in 1926 and quickly rose through the ranks, serving in Paris, Madrid, London, Moscow, and Tehran. By the late 1930s, he was head of the Trade Department and director-general for trade policy. During World War II, Hägglöf was central to Sweden's complex wartime diplomacy, managing trade relations with both Nazi Germany and the Western Allies. His ability to maintain Sweden's neutrality and secure essential supplies while resisting German political and financial pressure was widely admired. He was known for his firmness and skill as a negotiator, often balancing great-power interests to preserve Sweden's independence.

After the war, Hägglöf represented Sweden in a number of key international forums. He served as envoy to The Hague and Moscow, as Sweden's first Permanent Representative to the United Nations, and took part in founding the Council of Europe in 1949. From 1948 to 1967, Hägglöf served as Sweden's Ambassador to the United Kingdom — a post that defined his legacy. During this long tenure, he became a highly respected figure in London diplomatic circles, ultimately becoming Doyen of the diplomatic corps and a trusted advisor to successive British Prime Ministers. His tenure greatly strengthened Anglo-Swedish relations and brought Sweden unusual diplomatic visibility for a neutral nation.

In 1967, he was appointed Ambassador to France, where he developed a close working relationship with President Charles de Gaulle and reinforced Franco-Swedish ties. He was also considered a candidate for Secretary-General of the OECD, with French support, though the position never materialised. After retiring in 1971, Hägglöf became a prolific author, publishing memoirs and essays that offered insight into international politics and Swedish diplomacy. His works — including Meeting with Europe, Contemporary Witness, and English Years — were well received for their historical depth and clarity.

Throughout his career, Hägglöf was recognised for his intelligence, composure, and integrity. He combined historical understanding with diplomatic pragmatism, guiding Sweden through the challenges of war and peace with a steady hand. His motto, "Duty above all," reflected the principled professionalism that made him one of Sweden's foremost and most respected diplomats.

== Early life ==
Hägglöf was born on 12 December 1904 in Helsingborg City Parish in Helsingborg, Sweden, the son of the industrialist, municipal politician, and deputy district judge Richard Hägglöf (1865–1933) and his wife Sigrid Ryding (1873–1932). At the time of his birth, his father was the managing director of AB Skånska handelsbanken's office in Helsingborg.

Hägglöf belonged to a family known since the 16th century in Grundsunda in Örnsköldsvik Municipality. He had many siblings, including six brothers, among them the ambassador Ingemar Hägglöf (1912–1995) and Colonel Lars Gösta Hägglöf (1897–1954). He was the cousin of ambassador Göran Ryding (1916–2007). His nephew, Kjell Hägglöf, was also a diplomat, but was murdered at the age of 29 in 1972 while serving as embassy secretary in Bogotá, Colombia.

Hägglöf completed his student examination on 12 May 1922 at Nya elementarskolan in Stockholm, his reserve officer's examination in 1924, and earned a Candidate of Law degree from Uppsala University in 1926. He then pursued studies in religious studies at the University of Berlin.

== Career ==
=== Early Career (1926–1938) ===
Gunnar Hägglöf entered the Swedish Ministry for Foreign Affairs in 1926, when he was appointed attaché. During the following years, he served in several European capitals: Paris and Madrid in 1927, London in 1928, and later in Moscow and Tehran in 1930. In 1931 he returned to the Ministry in Stockholm. That same year he was appointed acting second secretary, and in 1933 promoted to second secretary.

In 1934 Hägglöf was made first secretary in the Ministry's Trade Department, and in 1936 he became acting director, a position confirmed in 1938 when he was officially appointed Director of the Trade Department.

Throughout the early 1930s, Hägglöf participated in several important commissions and negotiations. He served on the 1930 Defence Commission (1931), acted as secretary to the Swedish delegation at the Conference for the Reduction and Limitation of Armaments between 1932 and 1934, and took part in negotiations on credit agreements with the Soviet Union in 1934.

Between 1934 and 1936, he served on the delegation for Nordic Economic Cooperation, and from 1934 to 1938, he was both secretary and expert in the negotiations with Nazi Germany on the exchange of goods and payments.

=== World War II Years (1939–1945) ===
In 1939, Gunnar Hägglöf was appointed director-general for trade policy (utrikesråd) and head of the Trade Department at the Swedish Ministry for Foreign Affairs. On 14 October 1939, he was temporarily appointed minister without portfolio in Prime Minister Per Albin Hansson's second cabinet, with responsibility for trade policy during the early months of the war. He held this position until 13 December 1939, after which he resumed his post as head of the Trade Department.

For the following five years, until the spring of 1944, Hägglöf bore the heavy responsibility of formulating and implementing Sweden's wartime trade policy. His management of Sweden's trade relations with Nazi Germany, at a time when the country was under severe political, military, and economic pressure, earned him recognition as a highly skilled and farsighted negotiator.

==== Trade Negotiations and Diplomatic Roles ====
In 1940, Hägglöf led Swedish delegations for trade negotiations with Germany, the United Kingdom, and the United States. He undertook special assignments in Berlin and Washington in 1940 and later in London from 1944 to 1945. During the same period, he served as the Swedish chairman of the permanent Anglo-Swedish Commission for trade negotiations.

Hägglöf also participated in political talks with Germany from 15 to 17 April 1940 and again on 11 May 1940, shortly after the German invasion of Denmark and Norway.

In recognition of his service, Hägglöf was given the title of Envoy in 1943 and later accredited to the Belgian and Dutch governments-in-exile in London in 1944.

==== Swedish Trade Policy and Relations with Germany ====
Between 1939 and 1944, Hägglöf carried the main responsibility for Sweden's foreign trade policy. His decisive and often bold handling of complex wartime negotiations helped maintain Sweden's independence and essential supply lines. One of his notable achievements was maintaining a favourable price parity between Swedish iron ore and German coal — the two key commodities in Swedish-German trade — while firmly resisting German demands for Swedish state loans. Sweden thus became the only European country that did not extend government credit to Nazi Germany.

Some members of the Swedish government regarded Hägglöf's policies as daring, even risky. The German leadership was at times angered by his firm stance. During one negotiation, Reichsmarschall Hermann Göring reportedly lost his temper and declared: "Mr Hägglöf, you are an incorrigible lawyer and diplomat. You understand nothing of the great destinies of nations!"

==== Shift Toward the West ====
As the war progressed, Hägglöf advocated a shift in Swedish trade policy towards the Western Allies. He conducted negotiations in London on a new trade agreement with the British government, which at first was considered too pro-Western by the Swedish cabinet. Six months later, however, the government realised he had been correct, and the agreement was concluded.

By that time, Hägglöf had been reassigned to the comparatively less influential post of envoy to the Belgian and Dutch governments-in-exile in London. Despite this, his reports from London attracted attention in Stockholm, and his abilities were soon recognised once again.

==== The Turning Point of the War ====
In early 1941, Sweden obtained permission from both belligerent sides to continue trade routes essential to its economy. Sweden exported pulp, steel, paper, and ball bearings, while depending on oil imports for shipping. Hägglöf travelled frequently between Stockholm, Berlin, and London to secure these arrangements. Public criticism, notably from editor-in-chief Torgny Segerstedt in Gothenburg, was directed at Sweden's concessions to Germany. The full scale of Nazi atrocities against Europe's Jewish population only became known when Allied forces liberated the concentration camps in 1945.

Following the German defeats at El Alamein in November 1942 and Stalingrad in January 1943, Swedish policy shifted further towards the Western Allies. They demanded that Sweden end German military transit through its territory by 1 October 1943 and substantially reduce its iron ore exports to Germany. In exchange, Sweden would receive significant fuel supplies.

Prime Minister Per Albin Hansson expressed gratitude for Hägglöf's role in achieving agreements with the Western powers in September 1943 and subsequently with Germany in January 1944. Germany was forced to accept the reduction of imports. Alongside Erik Boheman and the Wallenberg brothers, Marcus and Jacob, Hägglöf played a central role in safeguarding Sweden's interests amid the conflicting demands of the warring powers.

=== Postwar Diplomacy (1946–1967) ===
After the end of the Second World War, Gunnar Hägglöf's diplomatic career continued with new and significant assignments. In 1946, he was appointed Swedish envoy to The Hague and, later the same year, to Moscow, where he served until 1947. In 1947, Hägglöf became Sweden's Permanent Representative to the United Nations and was a delegate to the Interim Committee of the General Assembly that same year.

==== European Cooperation and International Missions ====
Hägglöf represented Sweden in negotiations leading to the establishment of the Council of Europe in 1949, demonstrating his continuing engagement in European integration efforts. He also took part in the Suez Conference of 1956, which addressed the international crisis following Egypt's nationalisation of the Suez Canal.

Within the Ministry for Foreign Affairs, he later became chairman of the Ministry's Recruitment Commission in 1957 and, from 1967, chairman of the Ministry's Admissions and Training Board.

==== Ambassador in London (1948–1967) ====
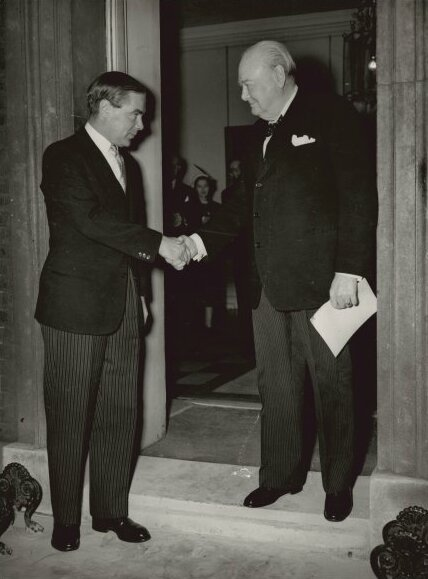
Sir Winston Churchill accepts the Nobel Prize in Literature from Gunnar Hägglöf, 1953.

In 1948, Hägglöf was appointed Ambassador to the United Kingdom, a position he would hold for almost two decades. His tenure in London became one of the most remarkable periods in modern Swedish diplomatic history.

The Swedish Embassy at 27 Portland Place was the centre of his activities. Hägglöf's diplomatic skill and his extensive contacts with British government circles soon earned him an exceptional reputation. In 1958, he became Doyen of the diplomatic corps in London — its senior member — and was said to have a "direct line to 10 Downing Street." Swedish journalist Gunnar Unger later described him as "an institution, an oracle, almost a legend in London's political and diplomatic circles." Hägglöf maintained close relations with successive British Prime Ministers and Foreign Office officials, a rare achievement for the representative of a small neutral state.

The ambassador's wife, Anna Hägglöf, also played a prominent role in London's social and cultural life. She was known for her charm, wit, and talent for creating a warm and distinguished atmosphere at the Swedish Embassy. According to journalist Barbro Alving, Anna Hägglöf combined "beauty with a mischievous humour" that made her one of "the wittiest and most captivating women in London's grand circles." Under the couple's leadership, the Swedish Embassy became regarded as one of the most sought-after and elegant venues in the city's diplomatic scene.

During his London years, Hägglöf demonstrated a rare ability to combine practical diplomacy with historical insight. His reports and analyses were characterised by precision, clarity, and a deep understanding of international developments. Colleagues praised his ability to absorb vast amounts of information quickly and to present it in concise, perceptive summaries.

His work was highly appreciated not only in Stockholm but also in London. When he turned 80 — seventeen years after leaving his post — he was honoured by five former British Prime Ministers: Harold Macmillan, Harold Wilson, Edward Heath, James Callaghan, and Alec Douglas-Home. This was considered a unique tribute to a foreign ambassador's contribution to Anglo-Swedish relations.

=== Paris and Later Career (1967–1971) ===
In 1967, Gunnar Hägglöf was appointed Ambassador of Sweden to France, a position he held until 1971. His reputation as one of Sweden's most experienced diplomats preceded him to Paris, where he quickly established good relations with President Charles de Gaulle.

De Gaulle, who found similarities between Swedish and French foreign policies toward the great powers, took a personal interest in Hägglöf. Their shared historical outlook and mutual respect strengthened diplomatic ties between the two countries.

During his time in Paris, Hägglöf became interested in the position of Secretary-General of the Organisation for Economic Co-operation and Development (OECD). Swedish diplomat Carl Henrik von Platen, who at that time served as Sweden's ambassador to the OECD, was partly responsible for encouraging Hägglöf's candidacy.

Hägglöf's bid for the post was supported by France and, in particular, by President de Gaulle himself. However, when de Gaulle resigned in the spring of 1968, the political situation in France changed dramatically, and the unrest that followed prevented Hägglöf's plans from being realised.

Although he did not attain the OECD post, Hägglöf continued to serve as Swedish ambassador in Paris until he reached retirement age in 1971. He was succeeded in Paris by his brother Ingemar Hägglöf.

== Retirement and Literary Work (1971–1980s) ==
After retiring from the Swedish diplomatic service in 1971, Gunnar Hägglöf devoted himself to writing. His memoirs and other publications drew on his extensive experience in international affairs and were widely read.

=== Memoirs and Historical Works ===
Hägglöf's first three volumes of memoirs — Meeting with Europe, covering the interwar period; Contemporary Witness, on the years of the Second World War; and Paths of Peace, about the immediate postwar years — were highly acclaimed and published in large editions. His narrative style, rich in historical context and illustrative episodes, attracted a dedicated readership.

Earlier works included Paradise for Us (1952) and Sweden's Wartime Trade Policy (1958). Following the release of his memoirs starting in 1971, he continued to publish extensively. Among these were English Years (1974), documenting his London tenure, followed by Memories for the Future, China as I Saw It, The Other Europe, and Be Careful in Berlin (published in 1986). Hägglöf's writings reflected his lifelong motto, "Duty above all," which was occasionally tempered with his belief that "it is humanity's duty to stir things up from time to time."

=== Later Publications ===
During the 1970s, Hägglöf published approximately one book per year. Living in southern France, he also contributed numerous articles to newspapers, combining personal observation with historical and political insight. His works were valued for their clarity, thorough research, and ability to place contemporary events in a broad historical perspective.

== Legacy and Assessment ==
Gunnar Hägglöf's diplomatic career spanned more than four decades, covering some of the most turbulent periods of the twentieth century. He played a central role in shaping Swedish foreign and trade policy during the Second World War, skillfully navigating the conflicting demands of Nazi Germany and the Western Allies while maintaining Sweden's independence and essential supplies. Over several decades, he remained a leading figure in the Swedish foreign service, shaping its policies and establishing a lasting reputation as one of its foremost diplomats.

Hägglöf's ability to combine historical perspective with practical diplomacy was widely acknowledged. His reports, analyses, and negotiations were characterised by clarity, foresight, and a strong sense of responsibility. Colleagues and foreign counterparts alike recognised his talent for understanding complex situations, anticipating developments, and implementing effective solutions. He was conscious of his status and sometimes disregarded formal rules and conventions within the Swedish administration. Nevertheless, his colleagues appreciated both his guidance and the independence he allowed them. Outwardly, he represented Sweden with calm authority, decisiveness, and exceptional skill.

=== Diplomatic Reputation ===
Hägglöf acquired a rare standing for a diplomat of a small country. In London, he was both the doyen of the diplomatic corps and a close advisor to British government officials, maintaining personal contacts with multiple Prime Ministers. His influence extended beyond protocol, making him an essential conduit for Anglo-Swedish relations. Similarly, his tenure in Paris was marked by strong personal relationships with French leaders, including President Charles de Gaulle, which enhanced Sweden's diplomatic presence in Europe.

=== Character and Leadership ===
Hägglöf is remembered as one of Sweden's foremost diplomats. Hägglöf encouraged independence and critical thinking among his staff, guided by his motto, "Duty above all." He was considered to be a respected leader and mentor due to his courage and calm principled approach to challenges.

== Personal life ==
On 12 December 1936 at Danderyd Church, Hägglöf married Brita Sundström (born 1917), the daughter of the director Birger Sundström and Ragnhild Svedlund. Their daughter Ann was born in 1946 in Stockholm. Ann, who was two months old when her parents divorced, grew up in United Kingdom after her mother remarried an English lieutenant colonel, later a businessman. Hägglöf refused to recognize his biological daughter.

On 7 May 1946, Hägglöf married the Italian Countess Anna Folchi-Vici (1918–2000), the daughter of Count Carlo Folchi-Vici and his Hungarian wife. Anna Folchi-Vici had one son, Axel, from a previous marriage to Roger du Monceau de Bergendal (1913–1989). Hägglöf adopted Axel.

Hägglöf was a resident of Les Hauts de Vaugrenier in Villeneuve-Loubet, France.

== Death ==
Hägglöf died on 12 January 1994. The burial took place in Borgarhemmet's church at Högalid on Södermalm in Stockholm.

== Awards and decorations ==
=== Swedish ===
- (Sweden) Commander Grand Cross of the Order of the Polar Star (5 June 1954)
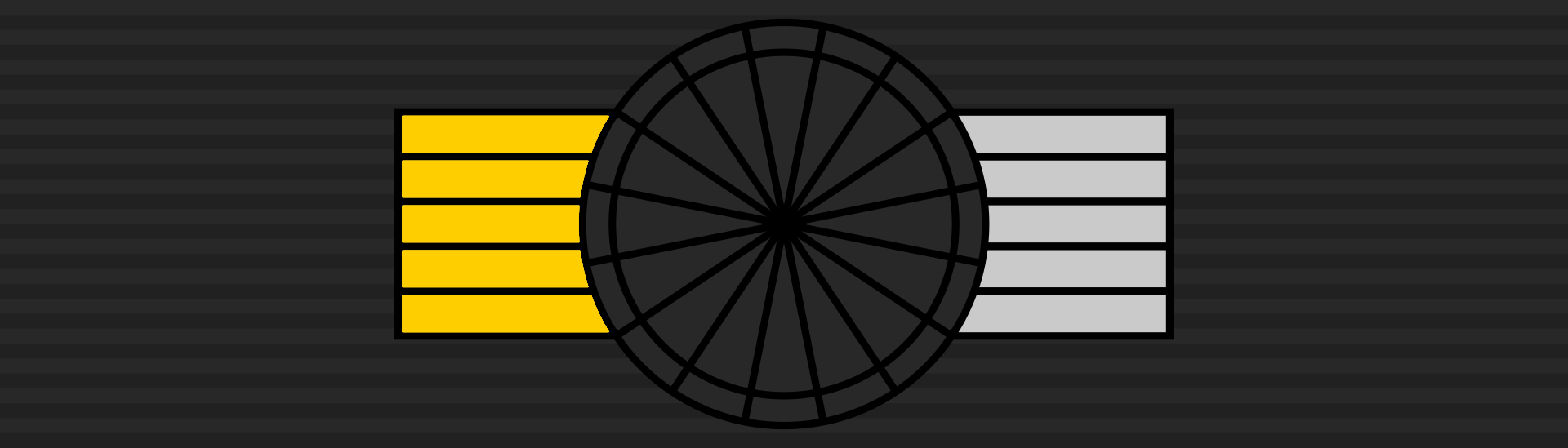
- (Sweden) Commander 1st Class of the Order of the Polar Star (15 November 1946)
- (Sweden) Commander of the Order of the Polar Star (6 June 1941)
- (Sweden) Knight of the Order of the Polar Star (1939)
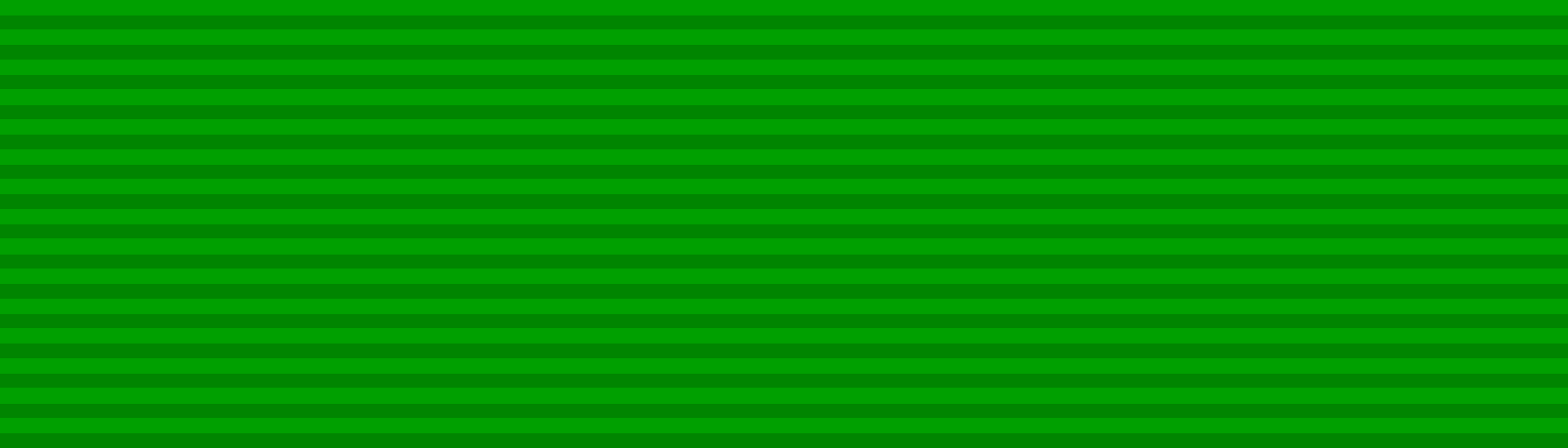
- (Sweden) Knight of the Order of Vasa (1938)

=== Foreign ===
- (Belgium) Grand Cross of the Order of the Crown
- (United Kingdom) Knight Grand Cross of the Royal Victorian Order
- (Denmark) Commander 1st Class of the Order of the Dannebrog
- (Kingdom of Italy) Grand Officer of the Order of Saints Maurice and Lazarus (20 October 1941)
- (Latvia) Grand Officer of the Order of the Three Stars
- (France) Commander of the Legion of Merit
- (Poland) Commander 2nd Class of the Order of Polonia Restituta
- (Nazi Germany) 3rd Class of the Order of the German Eagle
- (France) Officer of the Order of the Black Star
- (Spain) Knight of the Order of Isabella the Catholic

== Honours ==
- Member of the Royal Society for Publication of Manuscripts on Scandinavian History (1963)
- Honorary Doctor of Laws, University of Birmingham (1960)

== Bibliography ==
- Hägglöf, Gunnar (1986). "Var försiktig i Berlin!": möten med Hitlermotståndare under krigsåren ["Be careful in Berlin!": meetings with Hitler opponents during the war years] (in Swedish). Stockholm: Norstedt. ISBN 9118637426. SELIBR 7154491.
- Carlgren, Wilhelm M.; Bergquist, Mats; Hägglöf, Gunnar, eds. (1984). Diplomati och historia: festskrift tillägnad Gunnar Hägglöf den 15 december 1984 av vänner och medarbetare inom utrikesförvaltningen [Diplomacy and history: festschrift dedicated to Gunnar Hägglöf on 15 December 1984 by friends and colleagues in the foreign service] (in Swedish). Stockholm: Red. SELIBR 475465.
- —— (1984). Vägen ut [The Way Out] (in Swedish). Stockholm: Norstedt. ISBN 9118434924. SELIBR 7154018.
- —— (1983). Det kringrända Sverige [Encircled Sweden] (in Swedish). Stockholm: Norstedt. ISBN 9118331122. SELIBR 7153810.
- —— (1981). Det andra Europa [The Other Europe] (in Swedish). Stockholm: Norstedt. ISBN 9118130526. SELIBR 7153369.
- —— (1979). Sovjet-Ryssland i går, i dag, i morgon [Soviet Russia Yesterday, Today, Tomorrow] (in Swedish). Stockholm: Norstedt. ISBN 9117932521. SELIBR 7153011.
- —— (1978). Kina som jag såg det [China as I Saw It] (in Swedish). Stockholm: Norstedt. ISBN 9117832829. SELIBR 8345597.
- —— (1977). Tre män i Jalta [Three Men in Yalta] (in Swedish). Stockholm: Norstedt. ISBN 9117732026. SELIBR 8345583.
- —— (1976). Porträtt av en familj [Portrait of a Family] (in Swedish). Stockholm: Norstedt. ISBN 911763072X. SELIBR 7152403.
- —— (1975). Minnen inför framtiden: 1961-1971 [Memories for the Future: 1961–1971] (in Swedish). Stockholm: Norstedt. ISBN 9117530822. SELIBR 7152216.
- —— (1974). Engelska år: 1950-1960 [English Years: 1950–1960] (in Swedish). Stockholm: Norstedt. ISBN 9117430720. SELIBR 7152006.
- —— (1973). Fredens vägar: 1945-1950 [Paths of Peace: 1945–1950] (in Swedish). Stockholm: Norstedt. ISBN 9117330424. SELIBR 7151832.
- —— (1972). Diplomat: memoirs of a Swedish envoy in London, Paris, Berlin, Moscow, Washington. London: Bodley Head. ISBN 0370102746. SELIBR 4859409.
- —— (1972). Samtida vittne: 1940-1945 [Contemporary Witness: 1940–1945] (in Swedish). Stockholm: Norstedt. ISBN 9117256224. SELIBR 7151732.
- —— (1971). Möte med Europa: Paris-London-Moskva-Genève-Berlin, 1926-1940 [Meeting with Europe: Paris–London–Moscow–Geneva–Berlin, 1926–1940] (in Swedish). Stockholm: Norstedt. ISBN 911715362X. SELIBR 7151552.
- Ogley, Roderick, ed. (1970). The theory and practice of neutrality in the twentieth century. London: Routledge & Kegan Paul. ISBN 071006828X. SELIBR 8149248.
- —— (1966). Britain and Sweden: from the Vikings to the Common Market. Stockholm: Norstedt. SELIBR 665659.
- —— (1964). Jerusalem i taggtråd och andra resebilder från Orienten [Jerusalem in Barbed Wire and Other Travel Sketches from the Orient] (in Swedish). Stockholm: Norstedt. SELIBR 1240861.
- —— (1964). Jerusalem i taggtråd och andra resebilder från Orienten [Jerusalem in Barbed Wire and Other Travel Sketches from the Orient] (in Swedish) (2nd ed.). Stockholm: Norstedt. SELIBR 437913.
- —— (1961). Att säga ja till Europa: utopi och verklighet [Saying Yes to Europe: Utopia and Reality] (in Swedish). Stockholm: Norstedt. SELIBR 699781.
- —— (1961). A test of neutrality: Sweden in the Second World War. Stockholm. SELIBR 870157.
- —— (1958). Svensk krigshandelspolitik under andra världskriget [Swedish War Trade Policy during the Second World War] (in Swedish). Stockholm: Norstedt. SELIBR 79273.
- —— (1958). Sparande och utrikespolitik: anförande hållet vid Svenska sparbanksförenigens årsmöte den 17 oktober 1958 [Saving and Foreign Policy: Address Given at the Swedish Savings Banks Association Annual Meeting, 17 October 1958] (in Swedish). Stockholm: tr. Hæggström. SELIBR 728840.
- ——, ed. (1958). Välstånd spirar där många sparar: kapitalbildning och framåtskridande : föredrag vid Svenska sparbanksföreningens årsmöte den 17 oktober 1958 [Prosperity Thrives Where Many Save: Capital Formation and Progress – Lecture at the Swedish Savings Banks Association Annual Meeting, 17 October 1958] (in Swedish). Stockholm: [Svenska sparbanksfören.] SELIBR 1240863.
- Sweden in the time of Carl Linnaeus. London. 1958. SELIBR fwp1gwczcplh3k5d.
- —— (1955). Några betraktelser kring upplysningsverksamheten i Storbritannien [Some Reflections on Information Activities in the United Kingdom] (in Swedish). Norrköping. SELIBR 2717760.
- —— (1954). Svensk kontakt med Storbritannien: behöver våra kontakter i England förstärkas? [Swedish Contact with Great Britain: Should Our Connections in England Be Strengthened?] (in Swedish). Stockholm. SELIBR 8216633.
- Burns, Frank (1952). Paradis för oss: roman om Sverige under det andra världskriget [Paradise for Us: A Novel about Sweden during the Second World War] (in Swedish) (3rd ed.). Stockholm: Norstedt. SELIBR 1492474.
- —— (1949). Huvuddragen i Sveriges utrikeshandelspolitik under andra världskriget: Föredrag vid Exportföreningens årsstämma ... 1949 [Main Features of Sweden’s Foreign Trade Policy during the Second World War: Address at the Export Association’s Annual Meeting ... 1949] (in Swedish). Stockholm: Exportfören. SELIBR 1408129.

== Footnotes ==
Diplomatic posts
Preceded by Erik Sjöborg	Envoy of Sweden to the Netherlands; 1944–1946	Succeeded by Joen Lagerberg
Preceded by Gustaf von Dardel	Envoy of Sweden to Belgium; 1944–1946	Succeeded by Einar Modig
Preceded by Staffan Söderblom	Envoy of Sweden to Soviet Union; 1946–1947	Succeeded by Rolf Sohlman
Preceded by Herman Eriksson	Permanent Representative to the United Nations; 1947–1948	Succeeded by Sven Grafström
Preceded by Erik Boheman	Ambassador of Sweden to the United Kingdom; 1948–1967	Succeeded by Leif Belfrage
Preceded by Rolf Sohlman	Ambassador of Sweden to France; 1967–1971	Succeeded by Ingemar Hägglöf
