= Rolf Sohlman =

Swedish diplomat (1900–1967)

Ambassador of Sweden to France
- In office 2 November 1965 – 23 July 1967
- Preceded by: Ragnar Kumlin
- Succeeded by: Gunnar Hägglöf

Ambassador of Sweden to Denmark
- In office 14 January 1964 – 1965
- Preceded by: Stig Sahlin
- Succeeded by: Ragnvald Bagge

Ambassador of Sweden to the Soviet Union
- In office 15 April 1947 – 1964
- Preceded by: Gunnar Hägglöf
- Succeeded by: Gunnar Jarring

Envoy of Sweden to Afghanistan
- In office 30 June 1948 – 1960
- Preceded by: None
- Succeeded by: Dick Hichens-Bergström

Envoy of Sweden to Bulgaria
- In office 1 September 1951 – 1963
- Preceded by: Sven Allard
- Succeeded by: Gunnar Gerring

Envoy of Sweden to Romania
- In office 1 September 1951 – 1963
- Preceded by: Sven Allard
- Succeeded by: Olof Bjurström

Personal details
- Born: Rolf R:son Sohlman; 24 October 1900 Karlskoga, Sweden
- Died: 23 July 1967 (aged 66) Paris, France
- Resting place: Skogskyrkogården
- Spouse: Zinaida (Zina) Jarotskij (m. 1926)
- Children: 4
- Relatives: Ragnar Sohlman (father); Harald Sohlman (uncle); Rolf Sohlman (grandson); Karin Falck (daughter-in-law)
- Education: Karolinska högre allmänna läroverk Uppsala University; Institute of Higher International Studies
- Occupation: Diplomat

Rolf R:son Sohlman (24 October 1900 – 23 July 1967) was a Swedish diplomat who served as Sweden's ambassador to the Soviet Union from 1947 to 1964 and as ambassador to France from 1965 until his death. His career included diplomatic postings in several European countries, senior positions at the Swedish Ministry for Foreign Affairs, and extensive involvement in international trade negotiations.

Sohlman began his career in 1924 with the Nansen Mission, where he worked on humanitarian relief in the Soviet Union, and subsequently served at the League of Nations' International Institute of Intellectual Cooperation. He joined the Swedish Foreign Service in 1927 and held assignments in Riga, London, Dublin, Warsaw, Rome and Paris. From the 1930s onwards, he was involved in Swedish trade policy and represented Sweden in negotiations with a number of European countries. During the Second World War, he took part in negotiations concerning Sweden's economic relations with both the Western powers and the Axis countries, as well as with the Soviet Union. In 1944, he was appointed head of the Trade Department of the Ministry for Foreign Affairs and was given the rank of director-general for foreign affairs.

In 1947, Sohlman was appointed Sweden's envoy to Moscow and was promoted to ambassador later that year. He remained in Moscow for seventeen years, during a period that included the establishment and development of the Cold War and several changes in Swedish-Soviet relations. During his tenure, he was involved in matters including the case of Raoul Wallenberg, the 1952 Catalina affair, Swedish-Soviet economic and political relations, and negotiations concerning Swedish diplomatic premises in Moscow. He also represented Sweden at several sessions of the United Nations General Assembly. During parts of his tenure in Moscow, he was concurrently accredited to Afghanistan, Romania and Bulgaria.

Sohlman left Moscow in 1964 and briefly served as Sweden's ambassador to Denmark before being appointed ambassador to France in 1965. He remained in Paris until his death in 1967. His career included assignments in international relief work, multilateral organizations, foreign missions and senior positions within the Swedish government, with his seventeen-year ambassadorship in Moscow forming the longest and most sustained period of his diplomatic service.

== Early life ==
Sohlman was born on 24 October 1900 in Karlskoga Parish, Karlskoga, Örebro County, Sweden. He was the son of the civil servant, engineer, and explosives chemist Ragnar Sohlman (1870–1948), who was responsible for the establishment of the Nobel Foundation, and his wife Ragnhild Ström (1869–1942). His paternal uncles were the journalist Harald Sohlman (1858–1927) and the publisher Arvid Sohlman (1866–1949). His paternal aunts included the painter, illustrator, and textile artist Signe Sohlman (1854–1878), as well as the painter and literary critic Nanna Bendixson (1860–1923).

His paternal grandfather was the newspaper publisher August Sohlman (1824–1874). Rolf Sohlman was the brother of the business executive Sverre Sohlman (1902–1988) and the textile artist Astrid Sohlman-Nyblom (1905–1990).

Sohlman graduated from the Karolinska högre allmänna läroverk in Örebro on 21 May 1918 and enrolled at Uppsala University in the autumn semester of 1919. He served as vice chairman of the Verdandi Association from the autumn semester of 1923 to the spring semester of 1924. He completed the Bachelor of Arts intermediate examination on 15 December 1923 and, after additional examination, was awarded the degree on 15 December 1924, all at Uppsala University. In 1927, he received a diploma from the Institute of Higher International Studies in Paris, France.

== Career ==
=== Early career ===
Sohlman began his career in international relief work in 1924, serving as a mediator in the department of the Nansen Mission (of Fridtjof Nansen, involved in the 1921–1923 famine in Ukraine) for assistance to intellectuals, with assignments in Moscow and Simferopol. In 1925, he became an attaché at the League of Nations' institution for International Intellectual Cooperation. In 1927, he served as an amanuensis at the National Board of Health and Welfare and as secretary to the delegation for international social-policy cooperation. The same year, he was appointed attaché at the Swedish Ministry for Foreign Affairs. He served at the Swedish legation in Riga in 1928 and at the Swedish Consulate General in London in 1929, followed by an assignment in Dublin in 1930.

In 1931, Sohlman was appointed acting second secretary at the Ministry for Foreign Affairs and served as chargé d'affaires ad interim in Warsaw. From 1931 to 1947, he also served as secretary or representative in trade-policy negotiations with various countries. He was secretary to the Swedish delegation at the London Economic Conference in 1933. Appointed second legation secretary in Rome in 1934, Sohlman was promoted to first legation secretary there in 1936 and subsequently served in Paris from 1938. In 1939, he became head of division in the Trade Department of the Ministry for Foreign Affairs, and in 1940 he served as acting deputy head of the department.

During these years, and particularly during and after the Second World War, Sohlman played a prominent role in Swedish trade-policy negotiations. He led Swedish delegations in negotiations with Denmark, Norway, Belgium, the Netherlands, France, Italy, Switzerland, the Soviet Union, Hungary, Poland, Romania, Czechoslovakia, Germany, and Yugoslavia. He also chaired the Swedish section of the Swedish-British-American Government Commission. During the final years of the war, he was involved in winding down Sweden's trade with continental Europe and, after the war, in its resumption. He also participated in implementing the major 1946 credit agreement with the Soviet Union, in accordance with the guidelines established by the Swedish Government.

In 1941, Sohlman became a member of the National Export Credits Guarantee Board, serving as its vice chairman from 1942 to 1947. In 1944, he was appointed director-general for foreign affaires (utrikesråd) and head of the Trade Department. He was also appointed a member of the State Reconstruction Board (Statens återuppbyggnadsnämnd) that year. From 1945, Sohlman held the status of state secretary, with responsibility for assisting the Ministry of Commerce and Industry in handling trade-policy matters. That same year, he was granted the title of envoy and became chairman of the Board of Svenska Penninglotteriet AB, a position he held until 1947. From 1945, he was also a member of the board of the Russian Institute at Stockholm University College.

=== Ambassador in Moscow (1947–1964) ===
Sohlman served as Sweden's envoy in Moscow from 1947 and as ambassador from December of the same year until 1964. During this period, he was also accredited to Kabul from 1948 to 1960 and to Bucharest and Sofia from 1951 to 1964. His 17 years in Moscow constituted an unusually long diplomatic tenure at the same post.

Sohlman took up his position as head of the Swedish mission in Moscow in April 1947, at a time when relations between Sweden and the Soviet Union were increasingly affected by the emerging Cold War. During the summer of 1947, the question of upgrading diplomatic relations between the two countries was raised, and in December of that year Sohlman became ambassador. His previous experience of Russian affairs and Swedish-Soviet economic negotiations, including the Swedish-Soviet credit agreement of 1946, provided an important background to his work in Moscow.

One recurring issue during Sohlman's first years in Moscow was the Raoul Wallenberg case. When Sohlman took up his post, Swedish efforts to obtain information about Wallenberg, who had been arrested by Soviet authorities in 1945, had produced no results. On 14 June 1947, Sohlman met the Soviet Deputy Foreign Minister Yakov Malik and raised the matter. Malik stated that he had no knowledge of the case. In August of the same year, the Soviet government delivered a note denying any knowledge of Wallenberg and stating that he was not in the Soviet Union. Contacts concerning Wallenberg continued throughout Sohlman's tenure in Moscow.

Swedish-Soviet relations were periodically strained during the 1950s and 1960s. Issues affecting the relationship included the Wallenberg case, Sweden's security and neutrality policy, and various intelligence and espionage cases. A particularly serious dispute arose in 1952 after a Swedish military DC-3 aircraft disappeared over the Baltic Sea. A few days later, a Swedish Catalina aircraft participating in the search for the DC-3 was shot down by Soviet aircraft. The incident, known as the Catalina affair, led to diplomatic contacts between the Swedish and Soviet governments, in which Sohlman participated on the Swedish side.

Relations improved during the mid-1950s as political contacts between the two countries increased. Foreign Minister Östen Undén visited the Soviet Union in 1954, Soviet Foreign Minister Andrei Gromyko visited Sweden in 1955, and Prime Minister Tage Erlander visited the Soviet Union in 1956. The improvement was not permanent. Sweden's response to the Soviet intervention in Hungary in 1956 and subsequent Swedish intelligence issues again contributed to tensions. During Sohlman's final years in Moscow, the exposure of Colonel Stig Wennerström as a Soviet spy in 1963 placed an additional strain on relations.

Sohlman maintained close contacts with the Swedish foreign policy leadership, particularly during Östen Undén's tenure as foreign minister from 1945 to 1962. He also participated in Sweden's work at the United Nations and served as a delegate or deputy delegate of the Swedish delegation at several sessions of the UN General Assembly between 1947 and 1963.

Alongside political matters, Sohlman dealt with practical issues concerning the Swedish mission in Moscow. During the 1950s, negotiations were conducted concerning new Swedish chancery and residential premises. Sohlman raised the issue with Soviet authorities, and the negotiations became linked to a principle of reciprocal construction projects, under which Sweden and the Soviet Union would establish diplomatic facilities in each other's capitals.

=== Later career ===
Sohlman left Moscow in 1964 after 17 years in the post. He subsequently became Sweden's ambassador to Copenhagen, but was transferred to Paris as early as the following year, where he served as ambassador until his death in 1967.

== Personal life ==
In the mid-1920s, Sohlman worked on behalf of the League of Nations distributing food supplies during the Russian Civil War. While there, he became acquainted with Alexander Jarotskij, a professor of medicine at the University of Simferopol in Crimea, and a relationship developed between Sohlman and Jarotskij's daughter, Zinaida. On 12 February 1926, Sohlman married Zinaida (Zina) Jarotskij (born 24 February 1903 in Saint Petersburg, died 21 December 1978 in Högalid Parish, Stockholm) in Paris. She was the daughter of Professor Alexander Jarotskij and Antonia (Nina) Winberg.

They had four children: Inger (born 1927), Ragnar (1931–2007), Staffan (1937–2017), and Michael (born 1944). Their daughter Inger was married to the National Antiquarian Roland Pålsson (1922–2015). Through his son Ragnar, his grandchildren included actor Rolf Sohlman (born 1954) and film producer and director Anna Sohlman (born 1957), and through his daughter Inger, Director-General Thomas Pålsson (born 1956).

== Death and funeral ==
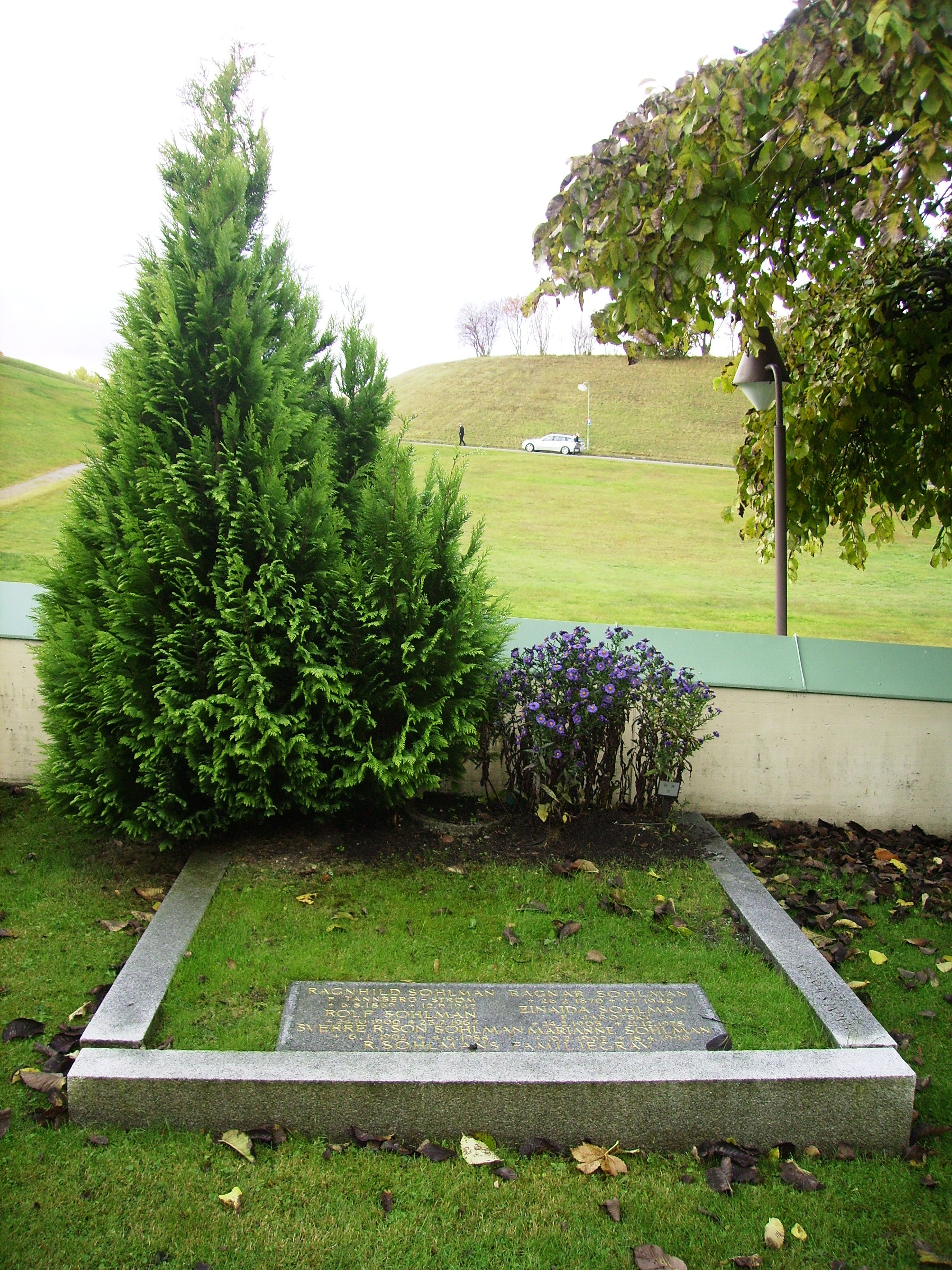
Sohlman family grave at Skogskyrkogården in Stockholm

Sohlman died on 23 July 1967 in Paris, France. His remains arrived by air in Sweden on 26 July 1967. Sohlman's wife and youngest son were also on the plane. At Arlanda Airport, they were met by Foreign Minister Torsten Nilsson, Cabinet Minister Alva Myrdal, Ambassador and Mrs. Carl Bergenstråhle, Foreign Affairs Counsellor and Mrs. Göran Ryding, the acting head of the Administrative Department of the Ministry for Foreign Affairs, Foreign Affairs Counsellor Axel Lewenhaupt, and the Chief of Protocol, Minister Claes König. Mrs. Myrdal presented roses to Mrs. Sohlman, while the deceased's sons carried the urn containing his remains past a platoon from the Svea Life Guards, which was parading with its colours. In addition to the deceased's immediate family, his brother, managing director Sverre Sohlman, and his wife were also present.

A memorial service was held on 2 August 1967 in the Chapel of the Holy Cross at the Skogskrematoriet. Those attending entered the chapel to the sound of the "Sonatina" from Bach's cantata Actus tragicus. The court singer Brita Hertzberg sang "Hvis du har varme tanker" by Børresen, after which the Kyndel Quartet performed a piece by Brahms, the Romance poco adagio from String Quartet No. 1 in C minor, Op. 51. Foreign Minister Torsten Nilsson gave a tribute to Sohlman. A speech was also delivered by Envoy Zenon P. Westrup. Court singer Einar Beyron sang "Drivsnö" by Nordqvist, after which the Kyndel Quartet performed the Allegretto from Haydn's String Quartet in G major, Op. 54 No. 1. Sohlman's surviving family members then took their final farewell. Finally, music director Olle Eksell performed on the organ a paraphrase of Swedish Hymn No. 21, followed by Bach's Prelude in B minor.

Sohlman was buried on 9 September 1967 at Skogskyrkogården in Stockholm.

== Reputation ==
Foreign Minister Torsten Nilsson described Rolf Sohlman as "one of the Swedish Foreign Service's most trusted and experienced officials." He praised Sohlman's strong political judgement and broad interests, combined with "great personal charm," and noted that he had served with skill and sound judgement in several posts of great importance to Sweden, "not least his long tenure as ambassador in Moscow."

Ambassador Gunnar Hägglöf recalled that Sohlman's British counterpart in Moscow had described him as "a unifying and conciliatory force of the greatest importance" and said that his name was known and respected throughout the diplomatic world. Hägglöf emphasized Sohlman's long career in the Swedish Foreign Service, particularly his role during the Second World War in Sweden's relations with the Western powers and, above all, in the complex negotiations with the Soviet Union. With "tireless patience and great foresight," Sohlman took part in negotiations that, according to Hägglöf, contributed significantly to Sweden emerging from the war with relatively good relations with the Soviet Union.

It was therefore natural, Hägglöf argued, that Sohlman became ambassador to Moscow soon after the war. During seventeen years in the Soviet capital, he became an internationally recognized figure as an authority on Russia and as dean of the diplomatic corps. Together with his Russian-born wife, whom Hägglöf described as beautiful, highly educated and intelligent, he turned the Swedish embassy in Moscow into a diplomatic centre. Hägglöf attributed Sohlman's efforts to foster good Swedish-Soviet relations not only to his familiarity with and sympathy for Russian culture, but also to his conviction that Sweden's and Scandinavia's future would benefit from a relationship of mutual understanding with their eastern neighbour.

On Sohlman's final post in the Swedish Foreign Service, as ambassador to Paris, Hägglöf likewise credited him with making a significant contribution. His prestige from Moscow, familiarity with fundamental European issues, and longstanding sympathy for France and French culture made him, in Hägglöf's view, an eminent representative of Sweden in Paris, much as he had previously been in Moscow.

== Awards and decorations ==
=== Swedish ===
- (Sweden) Commander Grand Cross of the Order of the Polar Star (5 June 1954)
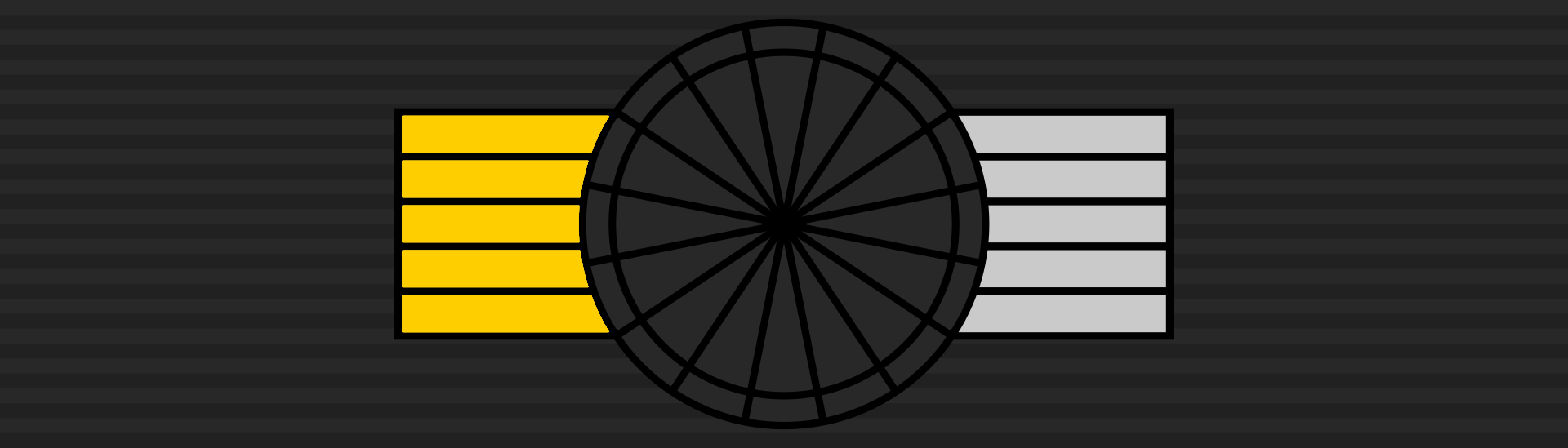
- (Sweden) Commander 1st Class of the Order of the Polar Star (15 November 1949)
- (Sweden) Commander of the Order of the Polar Star (6 June 1946)
- (Sweden) Knight of the Order of the Polar Star (1941)
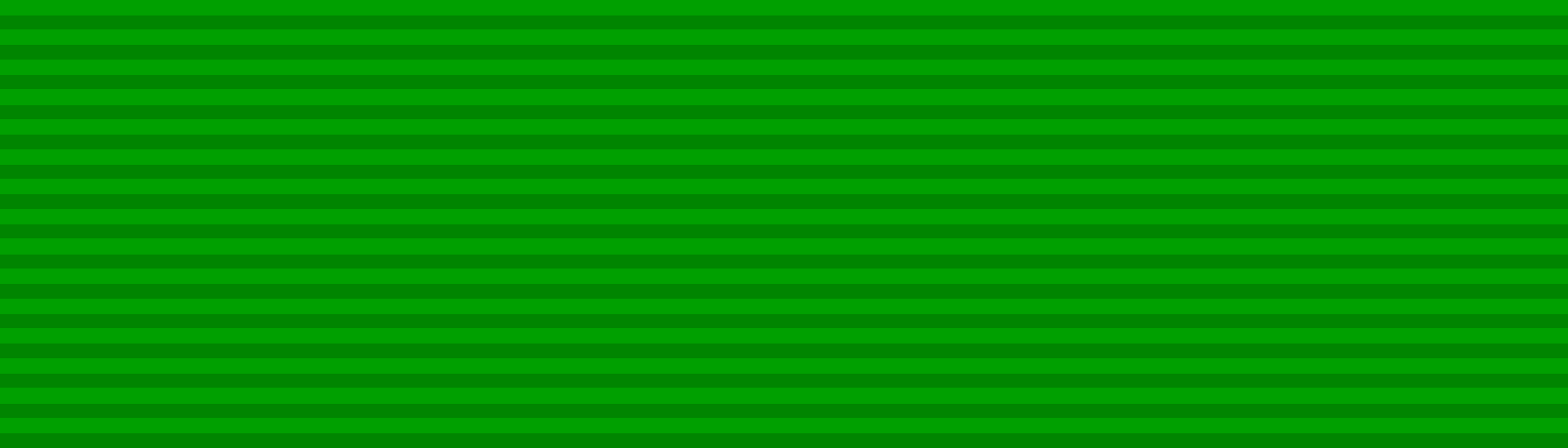
- (Sweden) Knight of the Order of Vasa (1938)

=== Foreign ===
- (Belgium) Grand Cross of the Order of Leopold II
- (Netherlands) Grand Cross of the Order of Orange-Nassau
- (Denmark) Commander 1st Class of the Order of the Dannebrog
- Commander 1st Class of the Order of the White Rose of Finland
- (Iceland) Grand Knight's Cross with Star of the Order of the Falcon
- (Norway) Commander with Star of the Order of St. Olav (1947)
- (Poland) Grand Officer of the Order of Polonia Restituta
- (Portugal) Grand Officer of the Military Order of Christ (13 November 1943)
- Commander of the Order of the Crown of Italy
- (Italy) Commander of the Order of Saints Maurice and Lazarus

Diplomatic posts
Preceded by Gunnar Hägglöf	Envoy/Ambassador of Sweden to the Soviet Union; 1947–1964	Succeeded by Gunnar Jarring
Preceded by None	Envoy of Sweden to Afghanistan; 1948–1960	Succeeded by Dick Hichens-Bergström
Preceded by Sven Allard	Envoy of Sweden to Romania; 1951–1963	Succeeded by Olof Bjurström
Preceded by Sven Allard	Envoy of Sweden to Bulgaria; 1951–1963	Succeeded by Gunnar Gerring
Preceded by Stig Sahlin	Ambassador of Sweden to Denmark; 1964–1965	Succeeded by Ragnvald Bagge
Preceded by Ragnar Kumlin	Ambassador of Sweden to France; 1965–1967	Succeeded by Gunnar Hägglöf
