= Ingemar Hägglöf =

Swedish diplomat (1912–1995)

- Born: Sten Ingemar Richardsson Hägglöf; 20 April 1912; Stockholm, Sweden
- Died: 7 November 1995 (aged 83); Stockholm, Sweden
- Burial place: Norra begravningsplatsen
- Education: Beskowska skolan Uppsala University
- Occupation: Diplomat
- Years active: 1916–1957
- Spouse: Ingegerd Beck-Friis (m. 1943)
- Children: 1
- Relatives: Gunnar Hägglöf (brother); Göran Ryding (cousin)

Sten Ingemar Richardsson Hägglöf (20 April 1912 – 7 November 1995) was a Swedish diplomat. Hägglöf began his diplomatic career in 1934 when he joined the Swedish Ministry for Foreign Affairs as an attaché. Early postings included London, Paris, and Berlin (1935–1941), followed by assignments in Stockholm and Moscow during and after World War II. He played a key role in postwar negotiations with the Soviet Union, including a major credit agreement and grain imports to Sweden.

From 1949, Hägglöf served as counsellor at the Swedish embassy in Washington, D.C., and later as deputy head of the Ministry's Trade Department (1950–1953). He became Sweden's first Permanent Representative to the Council of Europe (1953–1957) and served as Permanent Representative of Sweden to the OEEC/OECD (1953–1963). In 1960, he led Sweden's delegation to the European Free Trade Association in Geneva.

Hägglöf was ambassador to Helsinki from 1964 to 1971, where he closely monitored Finnish politics and the leadership of President Urho Kekkonen, contributing to Swedish understanding of Finland's position during the Cold War. In 1971, he succeeded his brother Gunnar as ambassador to Paris, where he helped secure a favorable customs agreement with the European Communities in 1972. He retired in 1978.

== Early life ==
Hägglöf was born on 20 April 1912 in Stockholm, Sweden, the son of the industrialist, municipal politician, and deputy district judge Richard Hägglöf (1865–1933) and his wife Sigrid Ryding (1873–1932). At the time of his birth, his father was the managing director of AB Skånska handelsbanken's office in Helsingborg.

Hägglöf belonged to a family known since the 16th century in Grundsunda in Örnsköldsvik Municipality. He had many siblings, including six brothers, among them the ambassador Gunnar Hägglöf (1904–1994) and Colonel Lars Gösta Hägglöf (1897–1954). He was the cousin of ambassador Göran Ryding (1916–2007). His nephew, Kjell Hägglöf, was also a diplomat, but was murdered at the age of 29 in 1972 while serving as embassy secretary in Bogotá, Colombia.

He completed his studentexamen at the Beskowska skolan in Stockholm on 19 May 1930 and earned a Candidate of Law degree from Uppsala University in 1934. och Candidate of Law degree from Uppsala University in 1934.

== Career ==
Hägglöf entered the Swedish Ministry for Foreign Affairs in 1934, when he was appointed attaché. He served in London, Paris, and Berlin from 1935 to 1941, at the Ministry in Stockholm from 1941 to 1943, in Moscow from 1943 to 1945, and again in Stockholm from 1945 to 1949. After the war, Hägglöf became secretary of the Swedish delegation that negotiated a credit agreement with the Soviet Union. The intention was to grant the Soviets a credit of one billion kronor for purchases from Swedish industry over five years. In 1947, Hägglöf negotiated with the Soviets regarding a substantial import of grain to Sweden. When the credit period expired, the Soviet Union had used 555 million of the allowed one billion.

He served as counsellor at the Swedish embassy in Washington, D.C., in 1949; as deputy head of the Ministry's Trade Department from 1950 to 1953; as Sweden's first Permanent Representative of Sweden to the Council of Europe from 1953 to 1957; Permanent Representative of Sweden to the OEEC/OECD from 1953 to 1963; head of Sweden's delegation to the European Free Trade Association (EFTA) in Geneva in 1960; and ambassador in Helsinki from 1964 to 1971.

Hägglöf served as Sweden's ambassador in Helsinki during a period of significant developments in Finnish–Swedish relations. In his book Diary from the Market Square (1990), written about his years in Helsinki, Hägglöf showed himself to be well informed about Finland's political environment and President Urho Kekkonen's leadership. His work involved interpreting and reporting Finland's political signals to Sweden, particularly regarding the country's position between East and West during the Cold War. He closely monitored Finnish affairs and analyzed Kekkonen's actions and political decisions. Hägglöf contributed to communication between the two countries and provided Sweden with assessments of Finland's security concerns, its relationship with the Soviet Union, and its internal political situation.

In 1971, he was succeeded in the Helsinki post by his cousin, ambassador Göran Ryding. The same year, Hägglöf succeeded his brother, Gunnar Hägglöf, as ambassador to Paris. As ambassador in Paris, he helped secure a customs agreement with the European Communities (EC) that was advantageous for Sweden in July 1972. He was succeeded in Paris by Sverker Åström in 1978 and then retired.

== Personal life ==
In 1943, Hägglöf married the Baroness Ingegerd Beck-Friis (1920–2013), the daughter of the Cabinet Chamberlain, Baron Carl Beck-Friis and Elisabeth (née Wersäll). They had one son, Richard (born 1952).

== Death ==
Hägglöf died on 7 November 1995. He was interred on 26 August 1996 at the Hägglöf family grave in Norra begravningsplatsen in Solna.

The diplomat and civil servant Anders Forsse, who worked under Hägglöf at the OEEC/OECD delegation in Paris, wrote in an obituary that "Hägglöf always listened with great attention and was highly receptive to arguments. His concern for his own prestige was happily negligible. He had a sense of humor, self-irony, and a talent for apt phrasing, which served him well in his work and brought joy to his colleagues."

== Awards and decorations ==
=== Swedish ===
- (Sweden) For Zealous and Devoted Service of the Realm (August 1976)
- (Sweden) Commander Grand Cross of the Order of the Polar Star (3 December 1974)
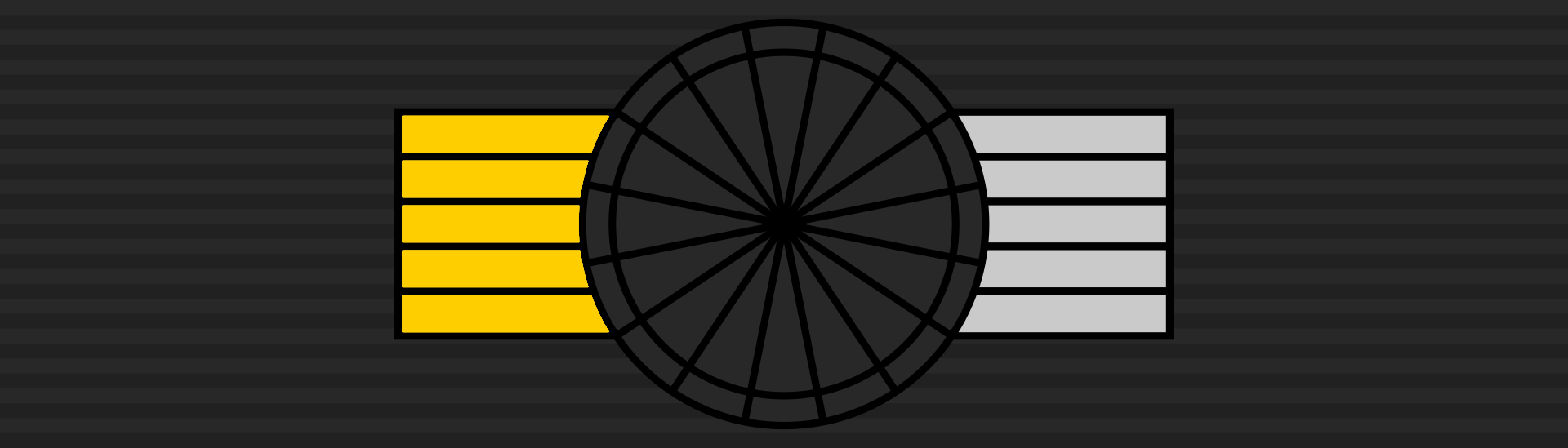
- (Sweden) Commander 1st Class of the Order of the Polar Star (6 June 1961)
- (Sweden) Commander of the Order of the Polar Star (6 June 1957)
- (Sweden) Knight of the Order of the Polar Star (1951)

=== Foreign ===
- (France) Grand Officer of the Ordre national du Mérite (24 April 1979)
- (Belgium) Grand Officer of the Order of Leopold II
- (Norway) Commander of the Order of St. Olav with Star (1953)
- (Spain) Commander 1st Class of the Order of Civil Merit
- (Nazi Germany) 4th Class of the Order of the German Eagle
- Knight 1st Class of the Order of the White Rose of Finland

== Bibliography ==
- Hägglöf, Ingemar (1991). Kauppatorin päiväkirja [Diary from the Market Square] (in Finnish). Helsingissä: Otava. ISBN 9511117998. SELIBR 7809058.
- Hägglöf, Ingemar (1991). Dagbok från Salutorget [Diary from the Market Square] (in Swedish). Stockholm: Norstedt. ISBN 9118940420. SELIBR 7155304.
- Hägglöf, Ingemar (1990). Dagbok från Salutorget [Diary from the Market Square] (in Swedish). Helsingfors: Söderström. ISBN 9515213142. SELIBR 7845887.
- Hägglöf, Ingemar (1987). Drömmen om Europa [The dream of Europe] (in Swedish). Stockholm: Norstedt. ISBN 9118730922. SELIBR 7154716.
- Hägglöf, Ingemar (1985). Työrukkasena Ruotsin idänpolitiikassa [As a workaholic in Sweden's Eastern policy] (in Finnish). Helsinki: Otava. ISBN 9511086316. SELIBR 7808488.
- Hägglöf, Ingemar (1984). Berätta för Joen: mina år med ryssarna 1943-1947 [Tell Joen: My Years with the Russians 1943-1947] (in Swedish). Stockholm: Norstedt. ISBN 9118433227. SELIBR 7154007.

Diplomatic posts
Preceded by None	Permanent Representative of Sweden to the Council of Europe; 1953–1957	Succeeded by Karl-Gustav Lagerfelt
Preceded by Erik von Sydow	Permanent Representative of Sweden to the OEEC/OECD; 1953–1963	Succeeded by Carl Henrik von Platen
Preceded by Gösta Engzell	Ambassador of Sweden to Finland; 1964–1971	Succeeded by Göran Ryding
Preceded by Gunnar Hägglöf	Ambassador of Sweden to France; 1971–1978	Succeeded by Sverker Åström
