= Sverker Åström =

Swedish diplomat

Sverker Åstrom
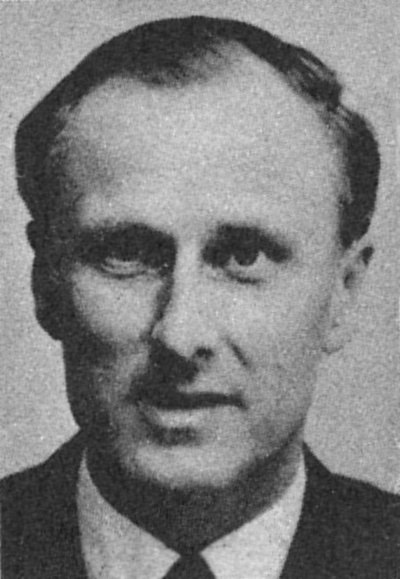
- Born: Carl Sverker Åström; 30 December 1915; Uppsala, Sweden
- Died: 26 June 2012 (aged 96); Stockholm, Sweden
- Education: Uppsala University
- Occupation: Diplomat
- Years active: 1939–1982

Carl Sverker Åström (30 December 1915 – 26 June 2012) was a Swedish diplomat. After completing his studies, Åström began his career as an attaché at the Ministry for Foreign Affairs in Stockholm. He served in the Soviet Union during World War II and later held posts in Washington, D.C., and London, rising to key leadership roles at the Ministry for Foreign Affairs. From 1964 to 1970, he served as Sweden's Permanent Representative to the United Nations, followed by leading Sweden's EEC treaty negotiations. He later became State Secretary for Foreign Affairs and ambassador to France before retiring in 1982.

== Early life and education ==
Åström was born on 30 December 1915 in Uppsala, Sweden, the son of John Åström, a lawyer, and his wife Brita Kugelberg. His father died shortly before the Kreuger Crash in 1930.

Åström studied at Uppsala University where he received a Bachelor of Arts in 1935 and a Candidate of Law in 1939. Åström was a member of the National Student Association in Uppsala, an organization affiliated with the pro-Nazi National League of Sweden, from 1932 to 1937.

== Diplomatic career ==
Following his studies, Åström was employed as an attaché at the Ministry for Foreign Affairs in Stockholm. From 1940 to 1943 he served at the Swedish mission to the Soviet Union, first in Moscow and then in Kuybyshev. He then served at the Foreign Ministry in Stockholm from 1943 to 1946. In 1946 he became legation secretary at the Swedish embassy in Washington, D.C. He returned to the Ministry for Foreign Affairs in 1948 and became director (Swedish: byråchef) there in 1949. From 1953 to 1956 he served as embassy councillor at the Swedish embassy in London, and from 1956 to 1963 he was head of the political division and a director (Swedish: utrikesråd) at the Ministry for Foreign Affairs.

In 1964, Åström succeeded Agda Rössel as Sweden's Permanent Representative to the United Nations. He stayed on this post until 1970, when he became Sweden's chief negotiator on the EEC treaty in Brussels. Thereafter he served as deputy state secretary for foreign affairs from 1971 to 1972 and state secretary for foreign affairs from 1972 to 1977, and as Swedish ambassador to France from 1978 until his retirement in 1982.

Although Åström was a close friend of Olof Palme, the former Prime Minister of the Social Democratic Party, Åström was never member of, or attached to, a political party.

== Later life ==
Åström's autobiography, Ögonblick: från ett halvsekel i UD-tjänst ("Moments: From Half a Century in the Duty of the Ministry for Foreign Affairs"), was published in 1992.

In 2003, at the age of 87, Åström came out as a homosexual. In an interview he has explained that his role as a diplomat made it impossible to declare himself as homosexual in public, but that his superiors and others were informed to eliminate the possibility of him being blackmailed by foreign agents.

In 2004 he received the "Gay person of the Year"-award from the Swedish gay-oriented magazine QX. In 2006 he was one of the co-hosts of the Swedish TV-series Böglobbyn ("The Gay Lobby") on Sveriges Television. However he decided to leave the series after just two episodes had been broadcast.

In 2011 Åström was awarded the congress prize from the Green Party recognizing his contributions to the global environment through the UN Environment Conference in Stockholm 1972.

He died in Stockholm in 2012.

== Awards and honours ==
=== Swedish ===
- (Sweden) Illis quorum, 12th size (1995)
- (Sweden) Commander Grand Cross of the Order of the Polar Star (6 June 1974)
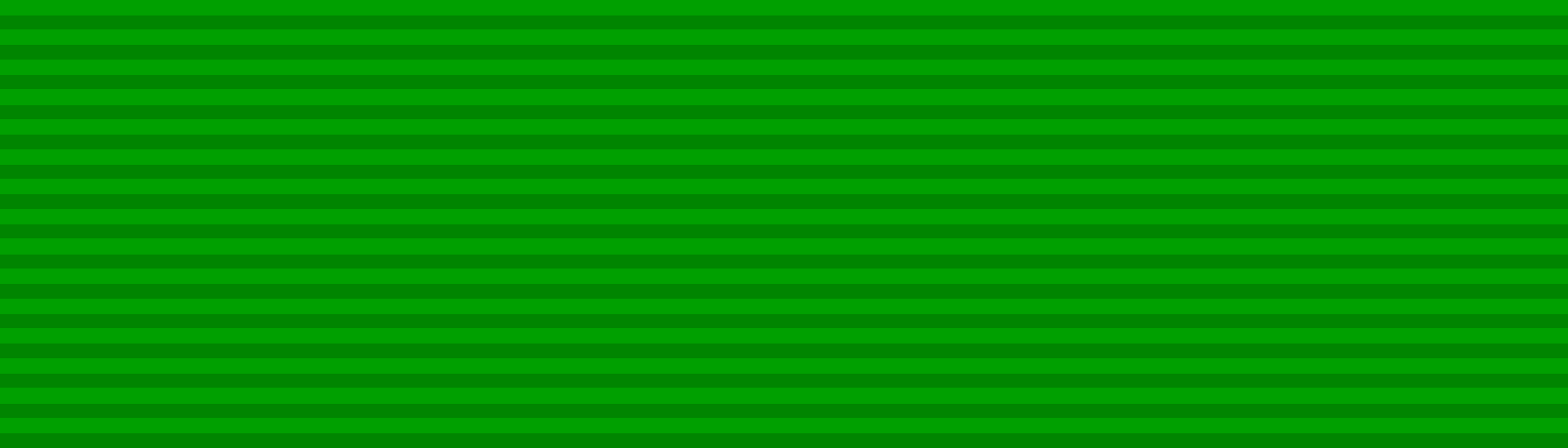
- (Sweden) Knight of the Order of Vasa

=== Foreign ===
- (Iceland) Grand Cross of the Order of the Falcon (10 June 1975)
- (Thailand) Knight Commander of the Order of the White Elephant (September 1960)
- (Netherlands) Grand Officer of the Order of Orange-Nassau (18 May 1957)
- (Ethiopian Empire) Grand Officer of the Order of the Star of Abyssinia
- Grand Decoration of Honour in Silver with Star for Services to the Republic of Austria (1958)
- (Norway) Commander of the Order of St. Olav
- (United Kingdom) Commander of the Royal Victorian Order
- Knight 1st Class of the Order of the Lion of Finland
- (Netherlands) Knight of the Order of Orange-Nassau
- (Czechoslovakia) Knight of the Order of the White Lion

== Bibliography ==
- Åström, Sverker (2003). Ögonblick: från ett halvsekel i UD-tjänst [Moment: from half a century in Foreign Ministry service] (in Swedish) (New ed.). Stockholm: Lind & Co. ISBN 9189538722. SELIBR 9079872.
- Åström, Sverker (1992). Ögonblick: från ett halvsekel i UD-tjänst [Moment: from half a century in Foreign Ministry service] (in Swedish). Stockholm: Bonnier Alba. ISBN 9134511792. SELIBR 7247284.
- Åström, Sverker (1987). Sweden's policy of neutrality (3rd ed.). Stockholm: Swedish Institute (Svenska institutet) (SI. ISBN 9152002063. SELIBR 7409119.
- Åström, Sverker (1985). La politique de neutralité de la Suède [Sweden's policy of neutrality] (in French). Stockholm: Inst. suédois [Sv. inst.] ISBN 9152001679. SELIBR 7409085.
- Åström, Sverker (1984). La politica de neutralidad de Suecia [Sweden's policy of neutrality] (in Spanish). Stockholm: Istituto Sueco [Sv. inst.] ISBN 91-520-0145-8. SELIBR 7409065.
- Åström, Sverker (1984). Schwedens Neutralitätspolitik [Sweden's policy of neutrality] (in German). Stockholm: Sv. inst. ISBN 9152001466. SELIBR 7409066.
- Åström, Sverker (1983). Svensk neutralitetspolitik [Sweden's policy of neutrality] (in Swedish). Stockholm: Sv. inst. ISBN 9152001261. SELIBR 7409052.
- Åström, Sverker (1983). Sweden's policy of neutrality (2nd ed.). Stockholm: Sv. inst. (SI. ISBN 915200127X. SELIBR 7409053.
- Åström, Sverker (1977). Sweden's policy of neutrality. Stockholm: The Swedish inst. [Sv. inst.] ISBN 9152000680. SELIBR 7408995.

Diplomatic posts
Preceded by Agda Rössel	Permanent Representative to the United Nations; 1964–1970	Succeeded by Olof Rydbeck
Preceded by Ingemar Hägglöf	Ambassador of Sweden to France; 1978–1982	Succeeded by Carl Lidbom
Civic offices
Preceded by Göran Ryding	Deputy State Secretary for Foreign Affairs; 1971–1972	Succeeded by Carl de Geer
Preceded by Ole Jödahl	State Secretary for Foreign Affairs; 1972–1977	Succeeded by Leif Leifland
