= Ragnar Sohlman =

Swedish chemical engineer (1870–1948)

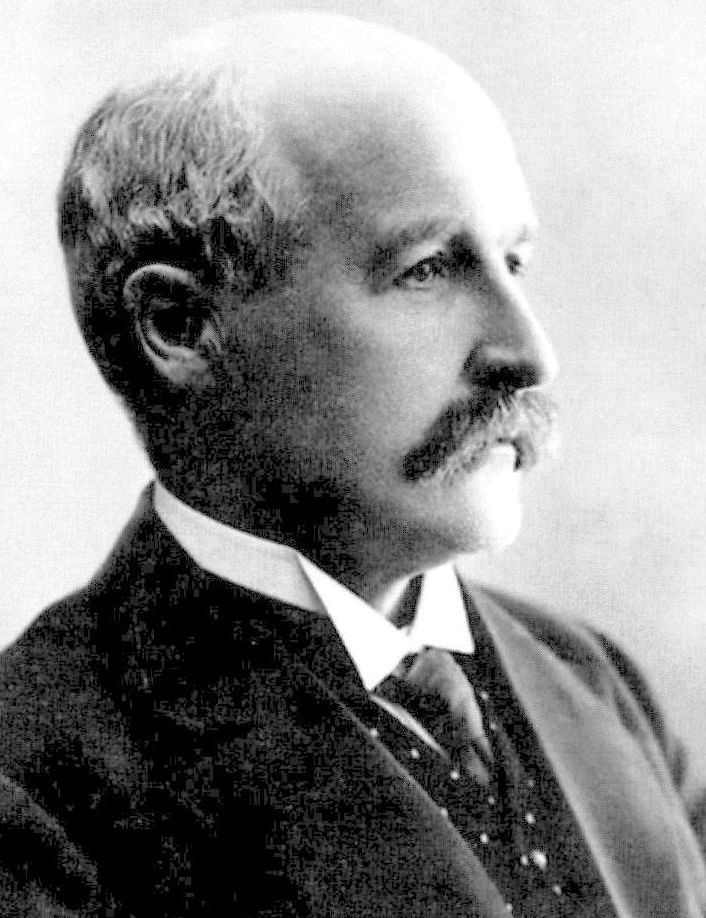
- Sohlman
- Born: 26 February 1870; Stockholm, Sweden
- Died: 9 July 1948 (aged 78); Solna, Sweden
- Known for: Creating the Nobel Foundation
- Relatives: Rolf Sohlman (son)
- Scientific career
- Fields: Chemical engineering

Ragnar Sohlman (26 February 1870 – 9 July 1948) was a Swedish chemical engineer, manager, civil servant, and creator of the Nobel Foundation.

== Biography ==
Ragnar Sohlman was born in Stockholm to August Sohlman (1824–1874), a well-known newspaper man, and his wife Hulda Maria Sandeberg. In 1887, he enrolled at the KTH Royal Institute of Technology in Stockholm and graduated as a chemical engineer in 1890.

In 1893 Sohlman became the assistant of Alfred Nobel in San Remo, and Nobel's will from 1895 named him and Rudolf Lilljequist as executors, with Sohlman expected to do most of the work. The will stated:

As Executors of my testamentary dispositions, I hereby appoint Mr Ragnar Sohlman, resident at Bofors, Värmland, and Mr Rudolf Lilljequist, 31 Malmskillnadsgatan, Stockholm, and at Bengtsfors near Uddevalla. To compensate for their pains and attention, I grant to Mr Ragnar Sohlman, who will presumably have to devote most time to this matter, One Hundred Thousand Crowns, and to Mr Rudolf Lilljequist, Fifty Thousand Crowns;

— Alfred Bernhard Nobel, will dated Paris, 27 November 1895

The sum of 100,000 crowns was a very significant amount at the time, and made Sohlman a wealthy man. The amount can be compared to the prize amount of the first Nobel Prizes in 1901, 150,782 crowns each.

After Alfred Nobel's death on December 10, 1896, Sohlman was occupied for several years with the task of realizing Nobel's intentions of establishing the Nobel Prize. Since the will did not contain detailed regulations regarding selection of laureates and was contested by Nobel's relatives, the task kept Sohlman and his advisors occupied for several years. Sohlman was a member of the interim board of the Nobel Foundation.

Sohlman also had a career as engineer and manager in Nobel-related companies, such as Bofors. He was also the director general of the Swedish National Board of Trade 1935–1936.

He was the executive director of the Nobel Foundation 1929–1946.

In 1940, he was awarded the Illis quorum.

Sohlman died at the Karolinska hospital in Solna in 1948.

Solhman's son Rolf Sohlman (1900–1967) was a Swedish diplomat and his grandson Michael (born 1944) is the present executive director of the Nobel Foundation.
