= Tor Bjurström =

Swedish artist

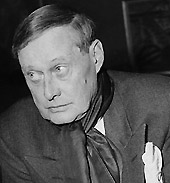
- Born: 13 July 1888; Stockholm, Sweden
- Died: 7 September 1966 (aged 78)

Tor Bjurström (13 July 1888 – 7 September 1966) was a Swedish artist specialising in landscape and portrait works.

== Early life and career ==
Tor Bjurström was born in Stockholm in 1888 to Per Gustaf Bjurström and Gustava Matilda Johanna Johansson. His father Per Gustaf was a wholesaler. Bjurström studied at the Swedish Artists Asscoaition school in the period 1905-07 under Richard Bergh and Karl Nordström in Stockholm, and then with Kristian Zahrtmann in Copenhagen in 1907-08. Following this Bjurström followed his contemporaries to Paris where he stayed from 1908-14, studying under Matisse, before leaving for Norway and Denmark during the First World War. His teachers and influences also included Van Dongen, and Othon Friesz.

From 1927 onward Bjurström was active as a teacher of the Valands painting school in Gothenburg, where he was also a curator of an art gallery from 1936 onwards. In 1940 Bjurström joined the State Art Council as a deputy. In 1961 Tor Bjurström received the Swedish Prins Eugen medal. A lecture hall at Sahlgrenska Academy is named after him.

Bjurström was a leading member of the "Göteborgskolorisrer" ("Göteborg colourists").

== Personal life ==
Bjurström married his wife Vera in 1919, with whom he had two children, Jesper Bjurström (1918–1998) and architect Frederik Bjurström (1920-1999). He is buried in Lidingö cemetery.
