= Rolf Sohlman (actor) =

Swedish actor

- Born: Rolf Peter Ragnarsson Sohlman; 12 March 1954 (age 72); Stockholm, Sweden
- Occupations: Actor; Film director
- Years active: 1970–2004
- Relatives: Karin Falck (mother); Rolf Sohlman (grandfather)

Rolf Peter Ragnarsson Sohlman (born 12 March 1954) is a Swedish actor and film director. He starred in the 1970 film A Swedish Love Story. Founder of the TV production company Jarowskij.

== Selected filmography ==
- A Swedish Love Story (1970)
