= Vallvik =

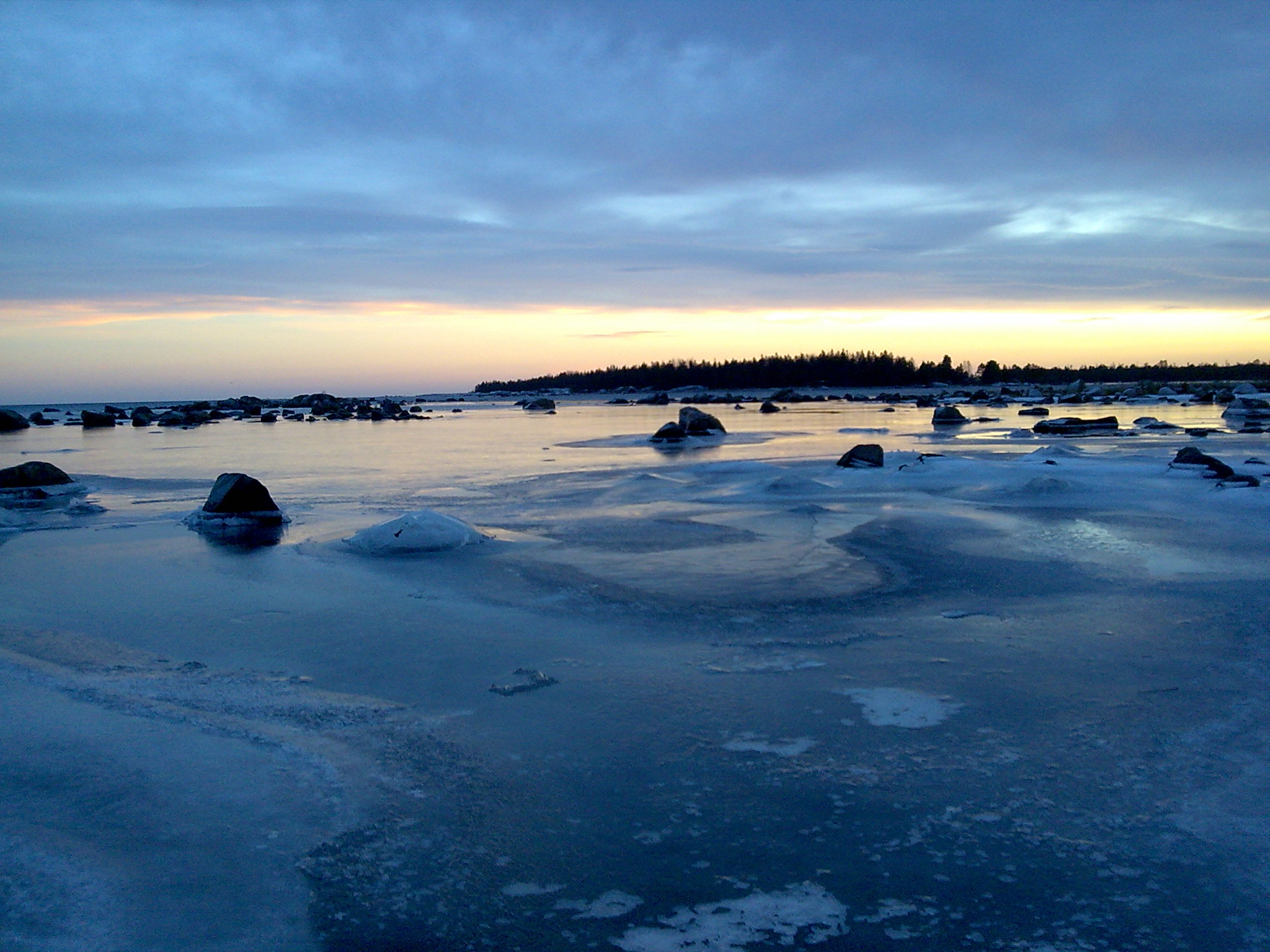

- Location within Sweden Gävleborg Location within Sweden
- Coordinates: 61°11′N 17°11′E
- Country: Sweden
- Province: Hälsingland
- County: Gävleborg County
- Municipality: Söderhamn Municipality

Area
  - Total: 1.23 km^{2} (0.47 sq mi)

Population (31 December 2010)
  - Total: 258
  - Density: 211/km^{2} (550/sq mi)
- Time zone: UTC+1 (CET)
  - Summer (DST): UTC+2 (CEST)

Vallvik is a locality situated in Söderhamn Municipality, Gävleborg County, Sweden with 258 inhabitants in 2010.

== History ==
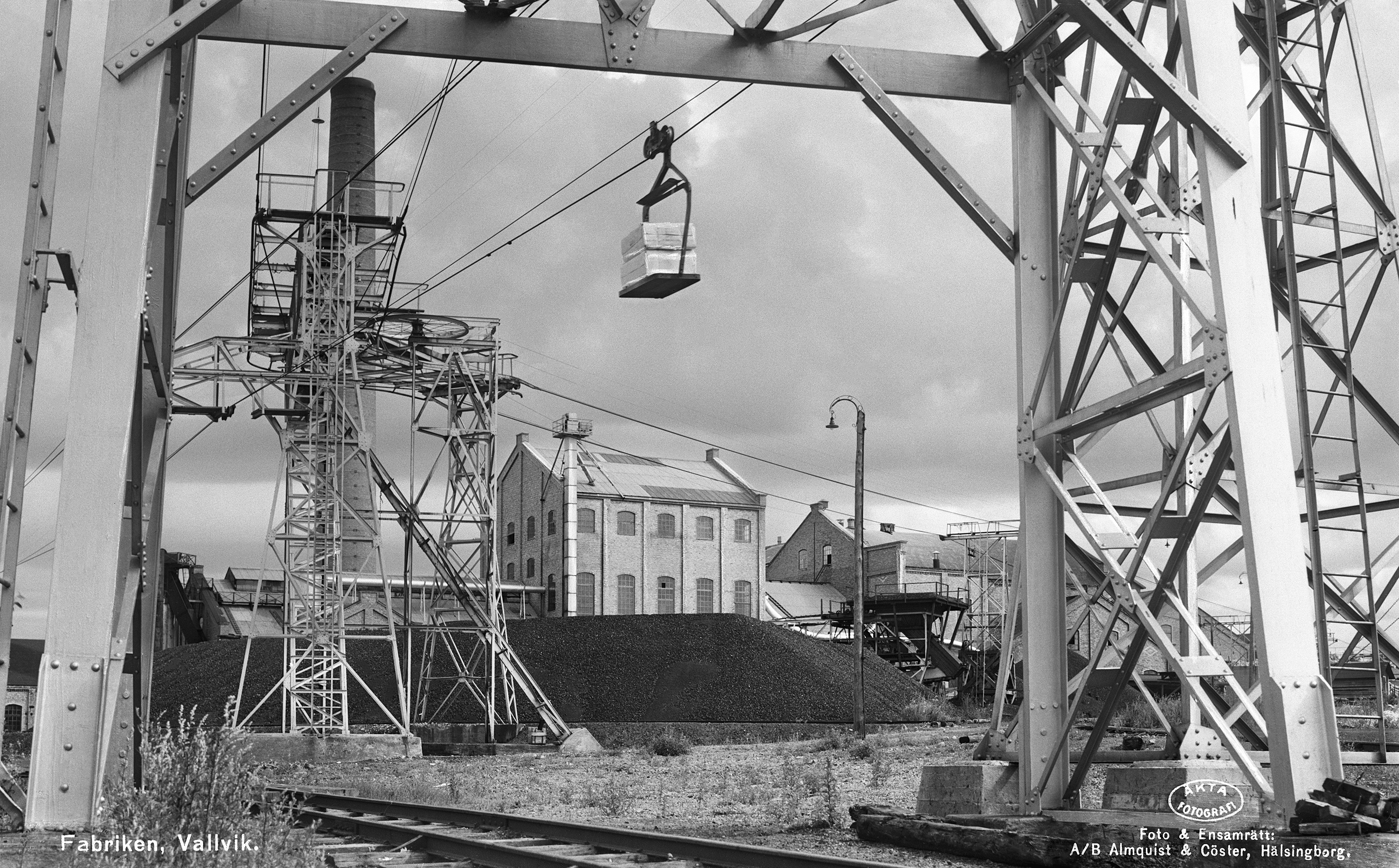
View of the pulp mill, between 1940–1955.

Vallvik mill was built in 1907 and is a sulphate pulp mill belonging to Rottneros AB.

Historical population
Year	Pop.	±%
1950	835	—
1960	947	+13.4%
1965	869	−8.2%
1970	773	−11.0%
1975	786	+1.7%
1980	632	−19.6%
1990	494	−21.8%
1995	414	−16.2%
2000	335	−19.1%
2005	288	−14.0%
2010	258	−10.4%

== Community ==
In the community there are old construction villages that were designed by Torben Grut. Vallvik, located at the so-called Virgin Coast (Swedish: Jungfrukusten)(named after the large island Storjungfrun in the archipelago), has a campsite and swimming beach with beach volleyball.
