= Claës Wersäll =

Swedish politician (1848–1919)

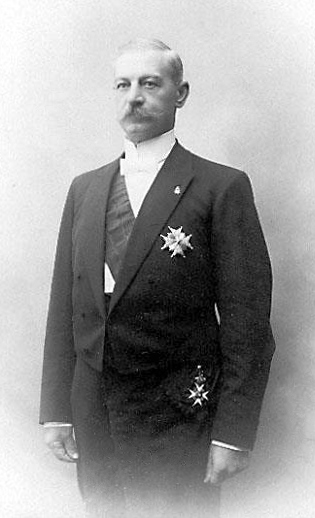

Minister for Finance
- In office 15 March 1895 – 16 July 1897
- Prime Minister: Erik Gustaf Boström
- Preceded by: Erik Gustaf Boström
- Succeeded by: Hans Hansson Wachtmeister

Personal details
- Born: 17 November 1848 Skara, Sweden
- Died: 19 December 1919 (aged 71) Enköping, Sweden

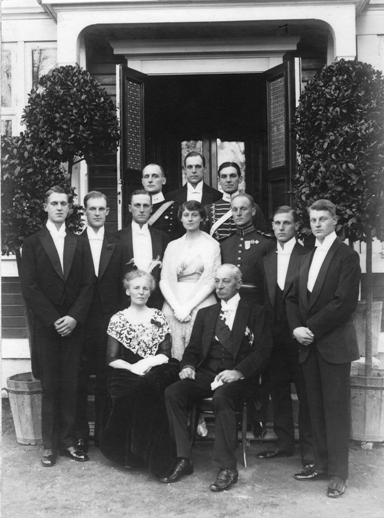
Wersäll Family in 1918

Claës Richard Wersäll (17 November 1848 – 19 December 1919) was a Swedish governor and artillery officer. Between 15 March 1895 and 16 July 1897 he served as a Swedish Finance Minister. He was also the governor of Kopparberg County (1893–1901) and Västmanland County (1901–1916). During his career he was awarded the Order of the Polar Star (1895), Order of the Sword (1889), Order of St. Anna and Order of St. Olav.

Wersäll became an orphan at the age 11, and grew up with his aunt. In 1879 he married Charlotta Wersäll. Among their 11 children, 9 were boys, one was a girl, and one died soon after birth. They were:

- Karl (1881–1945)
- Ture (1883–1965)
- Adolf (1885–1963)
- Gustaf (1887–1973)
- Claës-Axel (1888–1951)
- Nils (1890–1939)
- Elisabeth (1892–1985)
- Johan (1894–1959)
- Lars (1898–1952)
- Otto (1900–1983).

Six of the boys took part in the 1912 Summer Olympics: two as competitors, one as an official, and three as assistants, while another one, Ture, won an Olympic gold medal earlier in 1906. For this unusual achievement, their mother was awarded a special gold medal at the 1912 Games.

In 1914–1915 Wersäll developed a cerebral hemorrhage, which resulted in his deaths in 1919.
