= Charlotta Wersäll =

Swedish noblewoman

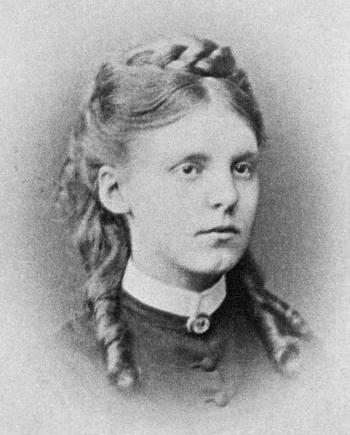
- Born: 12 May 1858; Geddeholm, Sweden
- Died: 4 April 1924 (aged 66)

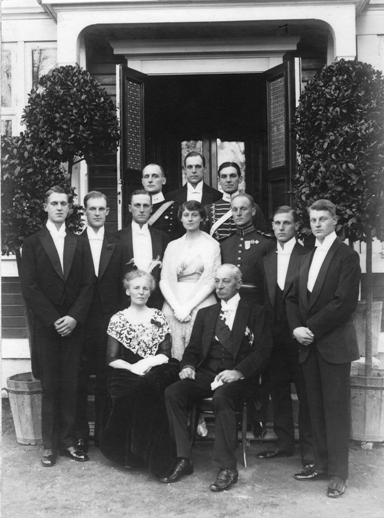
The Wersäll family in 1918

Eva Charlotta Wersäll (née Lewenhaupt, 12 May 1858 – 4 April 1924) was a Swedish noblewoman, a daughter of Count Carl Gustaf Lewenhaupt and Charlotta Elisabet von Essen. She had a sister, Charlotta Ulrika, and three brothers, Erik, Carl Axel and Reinhold Abraham. In 1879 she married Claës Wersäll, the future Finance Minister of Sweden. Among their 11 children, 9 were boys, one was a girl, and one died soon after birth. They were:

- Karl (1881–1945)
- Ture (1883–1965)
- Adolf (1885–1963)
- Gustaf (1887–1973)
- Claës-Axel (1888–1951)
- Nils (1890–1939)
- Elisabeth (1892–1985)
- Johan (1894–1959)
- Lars (1898–1952)
- Otto (1900–1983).

Six of the boys took part in the 1912 Summer Olympics: two as competitors, one as an official, and three as assistants, while another one, Ture, had won an Olympic gold medal earlier in 1906. For this unusual achievement, their mother was awarded a special gold medal at the 1912 Games.
