= Ture Wersäll =

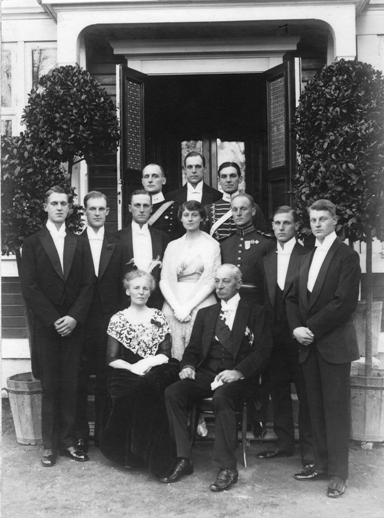
- Wersäll Family in 1918

Personal information
- Born: 12 August 1883 Stockholm, Sweden
- Died: 18 December 1965 (aged 82) Stockholm, Sweden

Sport
- Sport: Tug of war
- Club: Stockholms GF, Täby
Medal record
Representing Sweden
1906 Intercalated Games
Bronze medal – third place	1906 Athens	Team

Claës Ture Wersäll (12 August 1883 – 18 December 1965) was a Swedish gymnast who won a bronze medal in the tug of war event at the 1906 Summer Olympics. The team consisted of five gymnasts, two weightlifters and a javelin thrower.

Wersäll was born to the Swedish Finance Minister Claës Wersäll and Charlotta Wersäll, in a family of 10 siblings. Two of his eight brothers, Claës-Axel and Gustaf also competed at Summer Olympics.
