= Gustaf Wersäll =

Swedish modern pentathlete

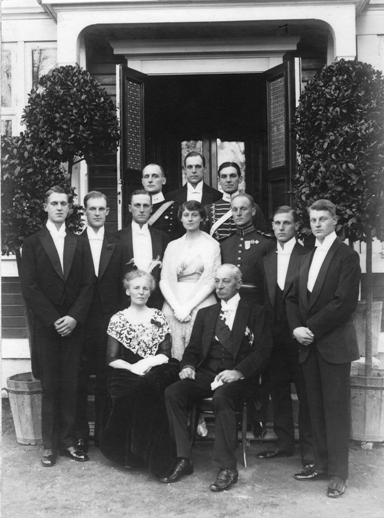
- Wersäll Family in 1918

Personal information
- Born: 14 January 1887 Stockholm, Sweden
- Died: 24 March 1973 (aged 86) Uppsala, Sweden

Sport
- Sport: Modern pentathlon
- Club: A1 IF, Stockholm

Erik Gustaf Wersäll (14 January 1887 – 24 March 1973) was a Swedish modern pentathlete. He competed at the 1912 Summer Olympics and finished in ninth place.

Wersäll was born to the Swedish Finance Minister Claës Wersäll and Charlotta Wersäll, in a family of 10 siblings. Two of his eight brothers, Claës-Axel and Ture, also competed at Summer Olympics.
