= Claës-Axel Wersäll =

Swedish gymnast

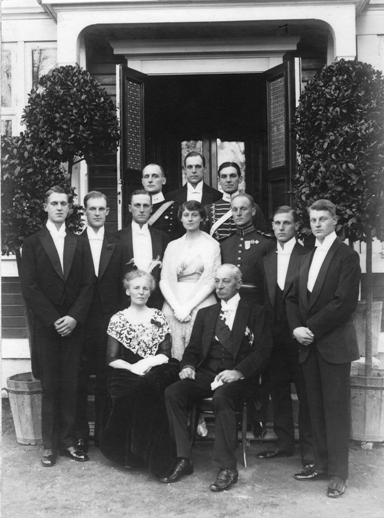
- Wersäll family in 1918

Personal information
- Born: 26 June 1888 Irsta, United Kingdoms of Sweden and Norway
- Died: 12 February 1951 (aged 62) Djursholm, Sweden
- Relatives: Claës Wersäll (father); Charlotta Wersäll (mother); Gustaf Wersäll (brother); Ture Wersäll (brother)

Gymnastics career
- Discipline: Men's artistic gymnastics
- Country represented: Sweden
- Club: Västerås Gymnastikförening
Medal record
Men's artistic gymnastics
Representing Sweden
Olympic Games
Gold medal – first place	1912 Stockholm	Team, Swedish system

Claës-Axel Wersäll (26 June 1888 – 12 February 1951) was a Swedish gymnast. He was part of the Swedish team that won the gold medal in the Swedish system event at the 1912 Summer Olympics.

Wersäll was born to the Swedish Finance Minister Claës Wersäll and Charlotta Wersäll, in a family of 10 siblings. Two of his eight brothers, Gustaf and Ture also competed at Summer Olympics.
